= Westminster City Council elections =

Class of UK elections

A map showing the wards of Westminster since 2022

Westminster City Council, the local authority of the City of Westminster in London, England, is elected every four years. Since the last boundary changes in 2022 the council has comprised 54 councillors representing 18 wards, with each ward electing three councillors. Elections are held every four years.

== Results summary ==
From the first elections to the council in 1964 until 2022, overall political control of the council was held by the Conservatives, with Labour gaining control in 2022:

Election	Overall Control	Conservative	Labour	Resident
1964	Conservative	41	19	-
1968	Conservative	55	5	-
1971	Conservative	37	23	-
1974	Conservative	37	23	-
1978	Conservative	39	19	2
1982	Conservative	43	16	1
1986	Conservative	32	27	1
1990	Conservative	45	15	-
1994	Conservative	45	15	-
1998	Conservative	47	13	-
2002	Conservative	48	12	-
2006	Conservative	48	12	-
2010	Conservative	48	12	-
2014	Conservative	44	16	-
2018	Conservative	41	19	-
2022	Labour	23	31	-
2026	Conservative	32	22	-

== Council elections ==
- 1964 Westminster City Council election
- 1968 Westminster City Council election (boundary changes took place, but the number of seats remained the same)
- 1971 Westminster City Council election
- 1974 Westminster City Council election
- 1978 Westminster City Council election (boundary changes took place, but the number of seats remained the same)
- 1982 Westminster City Council election
- 1986 Westminster City Council election
- 1990 Westminster City Council election
- 1994 Westminster City Council election (boundary changes took place, but the number of seats remained the same) (Note: The Barnet, Camden and Westminster (London Borough Boundaries) Order 1993) (Note: The City and London Borough Boundaries Order 1993) (Note: The Kensington and Chelsea and Westminster (London Borough Boundaries) Order 1993) (Note: The North and Central London (London Borough Boundaries) Order 1993)
- 1998 Westminster City Council election
- 2002 Westminster City Council election (boundary changes took place, but the number of seats remained the same)
- 2006 Westminster City Council election
- 2010 Westminster City Council election
- 2014 Westminster City Council election
- 2018 Westminster City Council election
- 2022 Westminster City Council election (boundary changes reduced the number of seats by six)
- 2026 Westminster City Council election

== Borough result maps ==
2002 results map

2006 results map

2010 results map

2014 results map

2018 results map

2022 results map

2026 results map

== By-election results ==
=== 1964–1968 ===
Baker Street by-election, 2 July 1964
Party	Candidate	Votes	%	±%
Conservative	M. Bowen	937		
Conservative	C.L. Gimblett	933		
Labour	D.M. Mackay	309		
Labour	W. Robins	304		
Communist	L.R. Temple	73		
Majority		624		
Turnout		13,811	9.7	
Conservative hold		Swing		
Conservative hold		Swing		

Harrow Road by-election, 2 July 1964
Party	Candidate	Votes	%	±%
Labour	T.G. Sheppard	unopposed		
Labour hold		Swing		

St. James's by-election, 2 July 1964
Party	Candidate	Votes	%	±%
Conservative	L.B. Farmiloe	unopposed		
Conservative hold		Swing		

Wilton by-election, 2 July 1964
Party	Candidate	Votes	%	±%
Conservative	A.M. Tennant	unopposed		
Conservative hold		Swing		

St James's by-election, 8 July 1965
Party	Candidate	Votes	%	±%
Conservative	F.D.B. Fitzgerald-Moore	147		
Liberal	N. Fogg	46		
Majority		101		
Turnout		2,156	9.0	
Conservative hold		Swing		

Maida Vale by-election, 18 August 1966
Party	Candidate	Votes	%	±%
Conservative	G.A. Wade	2,518		
Labour	E. Ryan	1,710		
Liberal	M.G. Rabin	543		
Majority		808		
Turnout		14,094	33.9	
Conservative hold		Swing		

Baker Street by-election, 8 June 1967
Party	Candidate	Votes	%	±%
Conservative	W.J.L. Drapkin	1,206		
Labour	P.A.W. Merriton	138		
Communist	J.A. Atkinson	45		
Majority		1,068		
Turnout		12,539	11.1	
Conservative hold		Swing		

=== 1968–1971 ===
Baker Street by-election, 9 July 1968
Party	Candidate	Votes	%	±%
Conservative	C. M. K. Taylor	1,008		
Communist	J. A. Atkinson	97		
Majority		911		
Turnout		12,137	9.1	
Conservative hold		Swing		

Hyde Park by-election, 9 July 1968
Party	Candidate	Votes	%	±%
Conservative	D. P. Beatty	1,667		
Liberal	M. M. G. Andrews	270		
Labour	E. R. Packer	213		
Majority		1,397		
Turnout		13,936	15.4	
Conservative hold		Swing		

Lord's by-election, 9 July 1968
Party	Candidate	Votes	%	±%
Conservative	B. C. Bowles	1,163		
Labour	J. M. Brenner	147		
Majority		1,016		
Turnout		9,764	13.4	
Conservative hold		Swing		

Regent's Park by-election, 9 July 1968
Party	Candidate	Votes	%	±%
Conservative	J. J. Walker-Smith	861		
Labour	W. G. Stuart	238		
Majority		623		
Turnout		9,100	12.1	
Conservative hold		Swing		

Warwick by-election, 28 November 1968
Party	Candidate	Votes	%	±%
Conservative	J. C. Beveridge	1,128		
Independent	J. V. Kemp	392		
Liberal	A. J. Clinch	162		
Labour	T. M. Fuller	152		
Independent	S. M. Harris	45		
Majority		736		
Turnout		9,294	20.0	
Conservative hold		Swing		

=== 1971–1974 ===
Harrow Road by-election, 15 July 1971
Party	Candidate	Votes	%	±%
Labour	C. Blackman	1,657		
Conservative	S. Kane	373		
Independent	D. J. B. Morgan	32		
Majority		1,284		
Turnout		10,966	18.9	
Labour hold		Swing		

Regent Street by-election, 23 March 1972
Party	Candidate	Votes	%	±%
Conservative	A. F. Wigram	927		
Labour	W. A. Knight	145		
Majority		782		
Turnout		7,118	15.1	
Conservative hold		Swing		

=== 1974–1978 ===
There were no by-elections.

=== 1971–1982 ===
There were no by-elections.

=== 1982–1986 ===
Belgrave by-election, 22 September 1983
Party	Candidate	Votes	%	±%
Conservative	Elizabeth A. Flach	724		
Labour	Peter E. Booker	163		
Majority		561		
Turnout		4,460	19.9	
Conservative hold		Swing		

The by-election was called following the resignation of Cllr Michael Forsyth.

Hamilton Terrace by-election, 1 November 1984
Party	Candidate	Votes	%	±%
Conservative	Judith A. Warner	786		
Alliance	Richard J. de Ste Croix	500		
Labour	John B. Thirlwell	272		
Majority		286		
Turnout		4,445	35.1	
Conservative hold		Swing		

The by-election was called following the resignation of Cllr Francis Maude.

Church Street by-election, 26 September 1985
Party	Candidate	Votes	%	±%
Labour	Gavin J. Millar	1,584		
Alliance	Bernard J. Hughes	704		
Conservative	Peter J. Carre	494		
Majority		880		
Turnout		6,786	41.4	
Labour gain from Labour Co-op		Swing		

The by-election was called following the death of Cllr Jean Merriton.

=== 1986–1990 ===
Lancaster Gate by-election, 14 April 1988
Party	Candidate	Votes	%	±%
Conservative	Simon Milton	1,209		
Labour	Francis M. Prideaux	443		
Liberal Democrats	Veronica M. Chamberlain	185		
Majority		766		
Turnout		4,546	40.5	
Conservative hold		Swing		

The by-election was called following the resignation of Cllr Peter Hartley.

Victoria by-election, 17 November 1988
Party	Candidate	Votes	%	±%
Conservative	David J. Harvey	779		
Labour	Martin H. Garside	507		
Liberal Democrats	Caroline F. Shorten	207		
SDP	Peter F. Sire	53		
Majority		272		
Turnout		4,061	38.1	
Conservative hold		Swing		

The by-election was called following the resignation of Cllr Rachel Whittaker.

Lancaster Gate by-election, 26 October 1989
Party	Candidate	Votes	%	±%
Conservative	Olga Polizzi	826		
Labour	Francis M. Prideaux	301		
Liberal Democrats	Rosemary Pettit	81		
Green	Annie Harris	66		
SDP	Andrew R. Belt	48		
Majority		525		
Turnout		4,629	28.6	
Conservative hold		Swing		

The by-election was called following the resignation of Cllr Patricia Kirwan.

=== 1990–1994 ===
Regent's Park by-election, 21 March 1991
Party	Candidate	Votes	%	±%
Conservative	William A. Wells	1,569	74.8	
Labour	Barbara J. Grahame	529	25.2	
Majority		1,040		
Turnout		5,767	36.6	
Conservative hold		Swing		

The by-election was called following the resignation of Cllr Barry Legg.

Hyde Park by-election, 25 March 1993
Party	Candidate	Votes	%	±%
Conservative	Edmund A. Lazarus	870	67.9	
Labour	Robert V. Ashdown	309	24.1	
Liberal Democrats	Zöe P. Goldstein	103	8.0	
Majority		561		
Turnout		4,349	29.6	
Conservative hold		Swing		

The by-election was called following the resignation of Cllr Shirley Porter.

Harrow Road by-election, 6 May 1993
Party	Candidate	Votes	%	±%
Labour	Jacqueline M. Rosenberg	1,639	73.3	
Conservative	Timothy M. Joiner	598	26.7	
Majority		1,041		
Turnout		6,390	35.2	
Labour hold		Swing		

The by-election was called following the resignation of Cllr Joseph Glickman.

Millbank by-election, 28 October 1993
Party	Candidate	Votes	%	±%
Labour	Simon J. Winters	1,286	57.6	
Conservative	Harry Haynes	722	32.4	
Liberal Democrats	Margaret Lang	223	10.0	
Majority		564		
Turnout		5,631	39.6	
Labour hold		Swing		

The by-election was called following the death of Cllr Hugh Garside.

=== 1994–1998 ===
Millbank by-election, 28 November 1996
Party	Candidate	Votes	%	±%
Labour	Mair Garside	1,224	52.0	
Conservative	Timothy J. Mitchell	989	42.0	
Liberal Democrats	Robin C. Metzner	119	5.0	
Natural Law	Richard P. Johnson	18	1.0	
Majority		235	10.0	
Turnout		2,350	41.6	
Labour hold		Swing		

The by-election was called following the resignation of Cllr Peter Bradley.

Queen's Park by-election, 16 October 1997
Party	Candidate	Votes	%	±%
Labour	Paul H. Dimoldenberg	974	77.5	+31.0
Conservative	Harry Phibbs	227	18.1	−2.1
Liberal Democrats	Herbert R. R. Hartwell	55	4.4	−1.6
Majority		747	59.4	
Turnout		1,256	20.4	
Labour hold		Swing		

The by-election was called following the resignation of Cllr Karen Buck.

Westbourne by-election, 16 October 1997
Party	Candidate	Votes	%	±%
Labour	Andrew J. Whitley	906	72.0	+15.5
Conservative	Clive L. Collins	284	22.6	−8.3
Liberal Democrats	Morag G. Beattie	68	5.4	−7.2
Majority		622	49.4	
Turnout		1,258	17.2	
Labour hold		Swing		

The by-election was called following the resignation of Cllr Andrew Dismore.

=== 1998–2002 ===
Westbourne by-election, 10 June 1999
Party	Candidate	Votes	%	±%
Labour	Simon P. Stockill	1,139	61.6	+7.8
Conservative	Iheoma E. U. Oteh	450	24.3	−3.0
Liberal Democrats	David Hall-Matthews	261	14.1	+1.2
Majority		689	37.3	
Turnout		1,850		
Labour hold		Swing		

The by-election was called following the resignation of Cllr Nicola Russell.

West End by-election, 24 June 1999
Party	Candidate	Votes	%	±%
Conservative	Glenys M. Roberts	520	65.5	+24.1
Labour	Wing K. Ho	160	20.2	+4.9
Liberal Democrats	Richard O'Brien	114	14.4	+2.7
Majority		360	45.3	
Turnout		794	16.0	
Conservative hold		Swing		

The by-election was called following the resignation of Cllr Richard Stirling-Gibb.

Church Street by-election, 4 May 2000
Party	Candidate	Votes	%	±%
Labour	Anthony G. Mothersdale	1,159	56.1	−4.6
Conservative	Martin A. Conway	642	31.1	+2.7
Liberal Democrats	Anthony P. Williams	264	12.8	+1.9
Majority		517	25.0	
Turnout		2,065	32.0	
Labour hold		Swing		

The by-election was called following the resignation of Cllr Ron Harley.

Harrow Road by-election, 4 May 2000 (2)
Party	Candidate	Votes	%	±%
Labour	Guthrie K. McKie	1,448		
Labour	Josephine S. Ohene-Djan	1,333		
Conservative	Daniel P. Astaire	618		
Conservative	Richard H. W. N. Phibbs	516		
Liberal Democrats	Philip J. Wardle	228		
Turnout		4,143	34.5	
Labour hold		Swing		
Labour hold		Swing		

The by-election was called following the resignations of Cllrs Jillian Selbourne and Gary Martin.

Regent's Park by-election, 5 April 2001
Party	Candidate	Votes	%	±%
Conservative	Daniel P. Astaire	499	64.6	−1.7
Labour	Katharine M. Hoskyns	227	29.4	+6.3
Liberal Democrats	Philip J. Wardle	46	6.0	−4.6
Majority		272	35.2	
Turnout		772	12.0	
Conservative hold		Swing		

The by-election was called following the resignation of Cllr Jonathan Djanogly.

=== 2002–2006 ===
Harrow Road by-election, 21 July 2005
Party	Candidate	Votes	%	±%
Labour	Ruth E. Bush	774	62.9	+10.3
Conservative	Jasna Badzak	306	24.9	+6.4
Liberal Democrats	Brian G. F. Mathew	150	12.2	−2.0
Majority		468	38.0	
Turnout		1,230	16.0	
Labour hold		Swing		

The by-election was called following the resignation of Cllr Josephine Ohene-Djan.

=== 2006–2010 ===
Abbey Road by-election, 3 May 2007
Party	Candidate	Votes	%	±%
Conservative	Lindsey J. B. Hall	1,334	65.2	−3.7
Liberal Democrats	Mark D. Blackburn	355	17.3	+1.3
Labour	Alon Or-Bach	280	13.7	−1.4
Independent	Alberto M. Lidji	78	3.8	+3.8
Majority		979	47.9	
Turnout		2,047		
Conservative hold		Swing		

The by-election was called following the death of Cllr Kevin Gardner.

Marylebone High Street by-election, 3 May 2007
Party	Candidate	Votes	%	±%
Conservative	Ian D. Rowley	1,041	66.7	−2.5
Liberal Democrats	Stuart A. Bonar	258	16.5	+1.2
Labour	Dave Rowntree	222	14.2	−1.4
UKIP	Colin R. Merton	40	2.6	+2.6
Majority		783	50.2	
Turnout		1,561		
Conservative hold		Swing		

The by-election was called following the resignation of Cllr Michael Vearncombe.

Church Street by-election, 24 July 2008
Party	Candidate	Votes	%	±%
Conservative	Mehfuz Ahmed	955	53.6	+24.5
Labour	Dave Rowntree	652	36.6	−3.0
Liberal Democrats	Martin A. Thompson	176	9.9	−1.3
Majority		303	17.0	
Turnout		1,783	24.1	
Conservative gain from Labour		Swing		

The by-election was called following the death of Cllr Antony Mothersdale.

Lancaster Gate by-election, 23 October 2008
Party	Candidate	Votes	%	±%
Conservative	Andrew Smith	805	60.3	−4.4
Liberal Democrats	Sue Baring	325	24.3	+6.6
Labour	Ahmed Hamid	205	15.4	−2.3
Majority		480	36.0	
Turnout		1,335	15.9	
Conservative hold		Swing		

The by-election was called following the resignation of Cllr Simon Milton.

West End by-election, 8 October 2009
Party	Candidate	Votes	%	±%
Conservative	Jonathan Glanz	526	60.8	+10.3
Labour	Damian Dewhirst	169	19.5	+0.6
Liberal Democrats	Christopher Gonzalez	108	12.5	−1.2
Green	Tristan Smith	62	7.2	−6.4
Majority		357	41.3	
Turnout		865	46.0	
Conservative hold		Swing		

The by-election was called following the death of Cllr Ian Wilder.

Queen's Park by-election, 10 December 2009
Party	Candidate	Votes	%	±%
Labour	Patricia McAllister	814	62.6	+10.2
Conservative	Abdul Ahad	211	16.2	−13.7
Green	Susanna Rustin	152	11.7	+11.7
Liberal Democrats	Mark Blackburn	123	9.5	−8.1
Majority		603	46.4	
Turnout		1,300		
Labour hold		Swing		

The by-election was called following the death of Cllr Mushtaq Qureshi.

=== 2010–2014 ===
Hyde Park by-election, 3 May 2012
Party	Candidate	Votes	%	±%
Conservative	Antonia M. Cox	1448		
Labour	Jack Gordon	563		
Green	Mark J. Cridge	182		
Liberal Democrats	Martin Thompson	178		
UKIP	Richard Bridgeman	96		
Independent	Abdulla A. J. Dharamsey	40		
Turnout			33%	
Conservative hold		Swing		

The by-election was called following the resignation of Cllr Colin Barrow.

Marylebone High Street by-election, 2 May 2013
Party	Candidate	Votes	%	±%
Conservative	Iain Bott	921		
Labour	Nik Slingsby	203		
Fighting for Spaces for People	Yael Saunders	184		
Liberal Democrats	Jeremy Hill	104		
UKIP	Paul Mercieca	96		
Green	Hugh Small	50		
Turnout			23.1%	
Conservative hold		Swing		

The by-election was called following the resignation of Cllr Harvey Marshall.

=== 2014–2018 ===
Warwick by-election, 7 May 2015 (Note: This was the same day as the 2015 general election.)
Party	Candidate	Votes	%	±%
Conservative	Jacqui Wilkinson	2,397	62.7	+10.2
Labour	Sophia Eglin	1,216	31.8	+13.2
UKIP	Mohammad Ali	207	5.4	−5.0
Majority		1,181	30.9	−3.0
Turnout		3,862	57.92	+22.5
Conservative hold		Swing		

The by-election was called following the resignation of Cllr Edward Argar.

Harrow Road by-election, 23 July 2015
Party	Candidate	Votes	%	±%
Labour	Tim Roca	1,139	75.4	+18.9
Conservative	Wilford Augustus	334	22.1	+6.4
UKIP	Robert Stephenson	38	2.5	−8.6
Majority		805	53.3	+13.5
Turnout		1,511	19.4	−13.5
Labour hold		Swing		

The by-election was called following the resignation of Cllr Nilavra Mukerji.

Bryanston and Dorset Square by-election, 22 October 2015
Party	Candidate	Votes	%	±%
Conservative	Julia Alexander	582	49.7	−2.0
Baker Street: No Two Ways	Steve Dollond	218	18.6	+18.6
Labour	Ananthi Paskaralingam	167	14.3	−4.9
Green	Hugh Small	116	9.9	−7.3
Liberal Democrats	Martin Thompson	46	3.9	−8.0
UKIP	Jill De Quincey	42	3.6	+3.6
Majority		364	31.1	−1.4
Turnout		1,171	17.9	−11.5
Conservative hold		Swing		

The by-election was called following the death of Cllr Audrey Lewis.

Church Street by-election, 5 May 2016 (Note: This was the same day as the 2016 London mayoral election.)
Party	Candidate	Votes	%	±%
Labour	Aicha Less	2,174	70.3	+3.2
Conservative	Rachid Boufas	512	16.6	−1.9
Liberal Democrats	Alistair Barr	205	6.6	+6.6
UKIP	Jill De Quincey	175	5.7	+5.7
Pirate	Andreas Habeland	26	0.8	+0.8
Majority		1,662	53.7	+5.1
Turnout		3,151	45	+10.2
Labour hold		Swing		

The by-election was called following the resignation of Cllr Vincenzo Rampulla.

=== 2018–2022 ===
Lancaster Gate by-election, 22 November 2018
Party	Candidate	Votes	%	±%
Conservative	Margot Bright	913	47.2	−1.5
Labour	Angela Piddock	684	35.4	−1.0
Liberal Democrats	Sally Gray	275	14.2	−0.7
Green	Zack Polanski	62	3.2	+3.2
Majority		229	11.8	−0.5
Turnout		1934	27.75	−10.3
Conservative hold		Swing		

The by-election was called following the resignation of Cllr Robert Davis.

Churchill by-election, 6 May 2021
Party	Candidate	Votes	%	±%
Labour	Liza Begum	1,340	45.6	
Conservative	Shaista Miah	1,016	34.6	
Liberal Democrats	Vikas Aggarwal	295	10.0	
Green	Zack Polanski	186	6.3	
For Britain	Andrew Cavell	99	3.4	
Majority		324	11.0	
Turnout		2,936		
Labour hold		Swing		

The by-election was called following the resignation of Cllr Andrea Mann.

=== 2022–2026 ===
Abbey Road by-election, 4 July 2024 (Note: This was the same day as the 2024 general election.)
Party	Candidate	Votes	%	±%
Conservative	Hannah Galley	1,852	43.9	−1.7
Labour	Alexander Burgess	1,344	31.9	+2.4
Liberal Democrats	Helen Toeman	560	13.3	−0.2
Green	Rajiv Rahul	459	10.9	−0.5
Majority		508	12.0	
Turnout		4,255		
Conservative hold		Swing		

The by-election was caused by the resignation of Cllr Amanda Langford.

Harrow Road by-election, 19 September 2024
Party	Candidate	Votes	%	±%
Labour	Regan Hook	512	44.2	−27.6
Green	Faaiz Hasan	244	21.1	+21.1
Workers Party	Hoz Shafiei	166	14.3	+14.3
Conservative	Jonathan Goff	162	14.0	−3.9
Liberal Democrats	Helen Toeman	63	5.4	−4.9
Independent	Abby-Jan Dharamsey	11	0.9	+0.9
Majority		268	23.1	
Turnout		1,158		
Labour hold		Swing		

The by-election was caused by the resignation of Cllr Tim Roca.

West End by-election, 19 September 2024
Party	Candidate	Votes	%	±%
Conservative	Tim Barnes	627	48.8	+8.5
Labour	Fiona Parker	489	38.1	−10.5
Green	Rajiv Sinha	94	7.3	+7.3
Liberal Democrats	Phillip Kerle	74	5.8	−5.3
Majority		138	10.7	
Turnout		1,284		
Conservative gain from Labour		Swing		

The by-election was caused by the resignation of Cllr Jessica Toale.

Vincent Square by-election, 27 February 2025
Party	Candidate	Votes	%	±%
Conservative	Martin Hayes	978	45.4	
Labour	Joanna Camadoo-Rothwell	700	32.5	
Reform	Nick Lockett	206	9.6	
Liberal Democrats	Luis Garcia	156	7.2	
Green	Sanya Mihaylovic	101	4.7	
CPA	Gabriela Fajardo	14	0.7	
Majority		278	12.9	N/A
Turnout		2,155	29.07	−10.2
Conservative gain from Labour		Swing		

The by-election was caused by the death of Cllr Gillian Arrindell.
