= West End (Westminster ward) =

Westminster City Council ward in London

Coordinates: 51°30′45″N 0°08′30″W

- Electoral ward for the Westminster City Council
- West End ward boundaries since 2022
- Borough: Westminster
- County: Greater London
- Population: 11,543 (2021) (Note: 2021 Census data reported for 2022 ward boundaries)
- Electorate: 7,509 (2022)
- Major settlements: West End of London
- Area: 2.182 square kilometres (0.842 sq mi)

Current electoral ward
- Created: 1978
- Number of members: 1978–2002: 2; 2002–present: 3
- Councillors: Paul Fisher; Patrick Lilley; Tim Barnes
- ONS code: 00BKGW (2002–2022)
- GSS code: E05000649 (2002–2022); E05013808 (2022–present)

West End is an electoral ward of the London borough of the City of Westminster, in the United Kingdom.

The ward has existed since elections to Westminster City Council that took place on 4 May 1978. It is named after the West End of London, which covers a wider area of inner West London.

It lies in the east of the borough and since 2022 broadly covers the neighbourhoods of Mayfair, Soho, Marylebone immediately north of Oxford Street and the section of Fitzrovia in Westminster. The boundaries of the ward were revised in 2002 and 2022. From 1978 it returned two councillors and since 2002 has returned three.

For elections to Parliament, West End is part of the Cities of London and Westminster constituency.

Notable former councillors for the ward include Nick Boles, MP for Grantham and Stamford from 2010 to 2019, and journalist Glenys Roberts.

== List of councillors ==
Term	Councillor	Party
1978–1990	Lois Peltz	Ind. Residents
1978–1982	Gordon Viner	Ind. Residents
1982–1998	David Avery	Conservative
1990–1998	Peter Martindale	Conservative
1998–2002	Nick Boles	Conservative
1998–1999	Richard Stirling-Gibb	Conservative
1998–2018	Glenys Roberts	Conservative
2002–2009	Ian Wilder	Conservative
2002–2006	John Cox	Conservative
2006–2014	Frixos Tombolis	Conservative
2009–2022	Jonathan Glanz	Conservative
2014–2018	Paul Church	Conservative
2018–2022; 2024–present	Tim Barnes	Conservative
2018–2022	Pancho Lewis	Labour
2022–present	Paul Fisher (Note: Paul Fisher changed parties in 2025)	Labour
2022–present	Paul Fisher	Conservative
2022–present	Patrick Lilley	Labour
2022–2024	Jessica Toale	Labour

== Summary ==
Councillors elected by party at each general borough election.

- Conservative
- Residents
- Labour

== Westminster council elections since 2022 ==
West End ward boundaries since 2022

There was a revision of ward boundaries in Westminster in 2022. Still principally made up of Soho and Mayfair, the part north of Oxford Street was reduced and now takes in only the streets of Marylebone immediately north of it and the section of Fitzrovia in Westminster.

The population of the ward at the 2021 Census (using 2022 boundaries) was 11,243.

=== 2024 by-election ===
The by-election took place on 19 September 2024, following the resignation of Jessica Toale. It took place on the same day as the by-election in Harrow Road ward.

2024 West End by-election
Party	Candidate	Votes	%	±%
Conservative	Tim Barnes	627		
Labour	Fiona Parker	489		
Green	Rajiv Sinha	94		
Liberal Democrats	Phillip Kerle	74		
Turnout				
Conservative gain from Labour		Swing		

=== 2022 election ===
The election took place on 5 May 2022.

2022 Westminster City Council election: West End (3)
Party	Candidate	Votes	%	±%
Labour	Paul Fisher	1,158		
Labour	Patrick Lilley	1,111		
Labour	Jessica Toale	1,111		
Conservative	Tim Barnes	961		
Conservative	Julie Redmond	923		
Conservative	Eoghain Murphy	913		
Liberal Democrats	Sophie Taylor	264		
Liberal Democrats	George Coelho	207		
Liberal Democrats	Jonah Weisz	158		
Turnout		2365		
Labour win (new boundaries)				
Labour win (new boundaries)				
Labour win (new boundaries)				

== 2002–2022 Westminster council elections ==
West End ward boundaries between 2002 and 2022

There was a revision of ward boundaries in Westminster in 2002. Councillors representing West End increased from two to three.

The boundary to the south with St James's ward was Shaftesbury Avenue, Piccadilly, and Hyde Park Corner. The boundary to the west with Knightsbridge & Belgravia ward was Park Lane. The boundary to the north with Bryanston and Dorset Square ward was Oxford Street and with Marylebone High Street ward was Oxford Street, Vere Street, Henrietta Place, Cavendish Square, Harley Street, and New Cavendish Street. The boundary with the London Borough of Camden was Cleveland Street, Goodge Street, Charlotte Place, Rathbone Street, Charlotte Street, Rathbone Place, Gresse Street, Hanway Street, Tottenham Court Road and Charing Cross Road.

=== 2018 election ===
The election took place on 3 May 2018.

2018 Westminster City Council election: West End (3)
Party	Candidate	Votes	%	±%
Conservative	Tim Barnes	990		
Labour	Pancho Lewis	984		
Conservative	Jonathan Glanz	973		
Labour	Patrick Lilley	947		
Labour	Caroline Saville	927		
Conservative	Hillary Su	868		
Campaign Against Pedestrianisation of Oxford Street	Ronald Whelan	291		
Green	Minne Fry	188		
Liberal Democrats	Sophie Taylor	178		
Liberal Democrats	Florian Chevoppe-Verdier	142		
Liberal Democrats	Alan Ravenscroft	127		
Turnout				
Conservative hold		Swing		
Labour gain from Conservative		Swing		
Conservative hold		Swing		

=== 2014 election ===
The election took place on 22 May 2014.

2014 Westminster City Council election: West End (3)
Party	Candidate	Votes	%	±%
Conservative	Paul Church	1,027		
Conservative	Glenys Roberts	914		
Conservative	Jonathan Glanz	865		
Labour	Katherine Cook	453		
Labour	Michael Dumigan	435		
Labour	Damian Dewhirst	393		
Independent	Andrew Murray	347		
Green	Anton De Beristain Humphrey	309		
Liberal Democrats	A. Ravenscroft	152		
Liberal Democrats	S. Sperry	145		
Turnout				
Conservative hold		Swing		
Conservative hold		Swing		
Conservative hold		Swing		

=== 2010 election ===
The election on 6 May 2010 took place on the same day as the United Kingdom general election.

2010 Westminster City Council election: West End (3)
Party	Candidate	Votes	%	±%
Conservative	Jonathan Glanz	1,648	17.9	
Conservative	Glenys Roberts	1,557	17	
Conservative	Frixos Tombolis	1,383	15	
Labour	David Bieda	813	8.9	
Liberal Democrats	Ian Steers	690	7.5	
Labour	Damian Dewhirst	686	7.4	
Labour	Ann Pettifor	657	7.2	
Liberal Democrats	Stephanie Taylor	641	7	
Liberal Democrats	Paul Morris	574	6.2	
Green	Cassandra Scott-Planer	429	4.7	
English Democrat	Frank Roseman	107	1.2	
Majority		570		
Turnout				
Conservative hold		Swing		
Conservative hold		Swing		
Conservative hold		Swing		

=== 2009 by-election ===
The by-election took place on 8 October 2009, following the death of Ian Wilder.

West End by-election, 8 October 2009
Party	Candidate	Votes	%	±%
Conservative	Jonathan Glanz	526		
Labour	D. Dewhurst	169		
Liberal Democrats	C. Gonzalez	108		
Green	T. Smith	62		
Turnout				
Conservative hold		Swing		

=== 2006 election ===
The election took place on 4 May 2006.

2006 Westminster City Council election: West End (3)
Party	Candidate	Votes	%	±%
Conservative	Glenys Roberts	1,011	20.7	
Conservative	Ian Wilder	958	19.6	
Conservative	Frixos Tombolis	883	18.1	
Labour	David Bieda	379	7.8	
Labour	Damian Dewhurst	298	6.1	
Liberal Democrats	Morag Beattie	275	5.6	
Green	Tristan Smith	271	5.5	
Liberal Democrats	Ian Steers	263	5.4	
Labour	Alon Or-Bach	261	5.3	
Liberal Democrats	Mark Blackburn	219	4.5	
UKIP	Colin Merton	67	1.4	
Majority		504		
Turnout		4,885	25.8	+2.4
Conservative hold		Swing		
Conservative hold		Swing		
Conservative hold		Swing		

=== 2002 election ===
The election took place on 2 May 2002.

2002 Westminster City Council election: West End (3)
Party	Candidate	Votes	%	±%
Conservative	Glenys Roberts	949		
Conservative	Ian Wilder	938		
Conservative	John Cox	919		
Labour	David Bieda	409		
Labour	Harold Brookstone	340		
Labour	Richard Hearnden	214		
Liberal Democrats	Michael Pepperrell	198		
Liberal Democrats	Ian Steers	191		
Liberal Democrats	Susan Kendrick	182		
Majority		510		
Turnout		6,726	23.4	
Conservative win (new boundaries)				
Conservative win (new boundaries)				
Conservative win (new boundaries)				

== 1978–2002 Westminster council elections ==
West End ward boundaries between 1978 and 2002

The ward of West End was created for the 1978 London borough council elections, returning two councillors. It was part of the City of London and Westminster South UK Parliament constituency. For elections to the Greater London Council it was part of the City of London and Westminster South electoral division until 1986.

=== 1999 by-election ===
The by-election took place on 24 June 1999, following the resignation of Richard Stirling-Gibb.

West End by-election, 24 June 1999
Party	Candidate	Votes	%	±%
Conservative	Glenys Roberts	520		
Labour	W. Ho	160		
Liberal Democrats	R. O'Brien	114		
Turnout				
Conservative hold		Swing		

=== 1998 election ===
The election on 7 May 1998 coincided with the 1998 Greater London Authority referendum.

1998 Westminster City Council election: West End (2)
Party	Candidate	Votes	%	±%
Conservative	Nick Boles	739		
Conservative	Richard Stirling-Gibb	582		
Independent	Peter Martindale	564		
Labour	David Bieda	273		
Liberal Democrats	R. O'Brien	208		
Labour	W. Ho	160		
Liberal Democrats	B. Silver	153		
Turnout				
Conservative hold		Swing		
Conservative hold		Swing		

=== 1994 election ===
The election took place on 5 May 1994.

1994 Westminster City Council election: West End (2)
Party	Candidate	Votes	%	±%
Conservative	David Avery	869		
Conservative	Peter Martindale	821		
Liberal Democrats	R. Rawlinson	339		
Liberal Democrats	M. Dumigan	318		
Labour	H. Brookstone	255		
Labour	M. Harley	223		
Turnout				
Conservative hold		Swing		
Conservative hold		Swing		

=== 1990 election ===
The election took place on 3 May 1990.

1990 Westminster City Council election: West End (2)
Party	Candidate	Votes	%	±%
Conservative	David Avery	1,028		
Conservative	Peter Martindale	921		
Ind. Residents	Lois Peltz	564		
Ind. Residents	M. Bennett	434		
Labour	P. Gamble	237		
Labour	A. Pink	227		
Turnout				
Conservative hold		Swing		
Conservative hold		Swing		

=== 1986 election ===
The election took place on 8 May 1986.

1986 Westminster City Council election: West End (2)
Party	Candidate	Votes	%	±%
Ind. Residents	Lois Peltz	707		
Conservative	David Avery	659		
Ind. Residents	M. Lothian	569		
Conservative	A. Barker	565		
Labour	S. Thomas	131		
Labour	R. Anstess	117		
Turnout				
Ind. Residents hold		Swing		
Conservative hold		Swing		

=== 1982 election ===
The election took place on 6 May 1982.

1982 Westminster City Council election: West End (2)
Party	Candidate	Votes	%	±%
Conservative	David Avery	783		
Ind. Residents	Lois Peltz	748		
Conservative	J. Chambers	704		
Ind. Residents	M. Lothian	641		
Labour	W. Hardy	124		
Labour	S. Thomas	119		
Turnout				
Conservative gain from Ind. Residents		Swing		
Ind. Residents hold		Swing		

=== 1978 election ===
The election took place on 4 May 1978.

1978 Westminster City Council election: West End (2)
Party	Candidate	Votes	%	±%
Ind. Residents	Lois Peltz	927		
Ind. Residents	Gordon Viner	892		
Conservative	T. Seear	837		
Conservative	J. Wells	791		
Labour	M. Cavalla	140		
Labour	A. Kahn	140		
Turnout				
Ind. Residents win (new seat)				
Ind. Residents win (new seat)				
