= Marylebone High Street (ward) =

- Former electoral ward for the Westminster City Council
- Marylebone High Street ward boundaries
- Borough: Westminster
- County: Greater London
- Electorate: 5,774 (2018)

Former electoral ward
- Created: 2002
- Abolished: 2022
- Councillors: 3
- Replaced by: Marylebone, Regent's Park and West End
- GSS code: E05000641

Marylebone High Street was an electoral ward in the City of Westminster from 2002 to 2022. The ward was first used in the 2002 elections and last used for the 2018 elections. It returned three councillors to Westminster City Council.

== Westminster council elections ==
=== 2018 election ===
The election took place on 3 May 2018.

2018 Westminster City Council election: Marylebone High Street (3)
Party	Candidate	Votes	%	±%
Conservative	Iain James Bott	1,181	59.2	−5.6
Conservative	Ian David Rowley	1,147	57.5	−4.4
Conservative	Karen Toni Scarborough	1,101	55.2	−2.9
Labour	Florence Amelia Kettle	395	19.8	+1.3
Labour	Barbara Irene Johnston	383	19.2	+2.2
Labour	Cheyenne Angel	381	19.1	+4.2
Campaign Against Pedestrianisation of Oxford Street	Michael John Dunn	355	17.8	N/A
Liberal Democrats	Alistair Graeme Barr	250	12.5	+0.6
Liberal Democrats	Andrew Donaldson Byrne	229	11.5	+1.7
Liberal Democrats	Stefan Nardi-Hiebl	195	9.8	+2.9
Green	Zack Polanski	165	8.3	−8.2
Majority		706	35.4	
Turnout		5782	34.7	+5.9
Conservative hold		Swing		
Conservative hold		Swing		
Conservative hold		Swing		

=== 2014 election ===
The election took place on 22 May 2014.

2014 Westminster City Council election: Marylebone High Street (3)
Party	Candidate	Votes	%	±%
Conservative	Iain James Bott	1,199	64.8	
Conservative	Ian David Rowley	1,145	61.9	
Conservative	Karen Toni Scarborough	1,075	58.1	
Labour	Madge Cavalla	343	18.5	
Labour	Owain Robert Garside	315	17.0	
Green	Hugh Small	306	16.5	
Labour	Peter Cavalla	275	14.9	
Liberal Democrats	Alistair Graeme Barr	220	11.9	
Liberal Democrats	Sally Sampson	182	9.8	
Liberal Democrats	Haude Lannon	127	6.9	
Majority		732	39.6	
Turnout		5187	28.8	−19.5
Conservative hold		Swing		
Conservative hold		Swing		
Conservative hold		Swing		

=== 2013 by-election ===
The by-election was held on 2 May 2013, following the resignation of Harvey Marshall.

2013 Marylebone High Street by-election
Party	Candidate	Votes	%	±%
Conservative	Iain Bott	921		
Labour	Nik Slingsby	203		
Fighting for Spaces for People	Yael Saunders	184		
Liberal Democrats	Jeremy Hill	104		
UKIP	Paul Mercieca	96		
Green	Hugh Small	50		
Turnout			23.1%	
Conservative hold		Swing		

=== 2007 by-election ===
The by-election was held on 3 May 2007, following the resignation of Michael Vearncombe.

2007 Marylebone High Street by-election
Party	Candidate	Votes	%	±%
Conservative	Ian D. Rowley	1,041	66.7	−2.5
Liberal Democrats	Stuart A. Bonar	258	16.5	+1.2
Labour	Dave Rowntree	222	14.2	−1.4
UKIP	Colin R. Merton	40	2.6	+2.6
Majority		783	50.2	
Turnout		1,561		
Conservative hold		Swing		

=== 2006 election ===
The election took place on 4 May 2006.

2006 Westminster City Council election: Marylebone High Street (3)
Party	Candidate	Votes	%	±%
Conservative	Harvey Marshall	1,333	69.2	
Conservative	Mark Page	1,264		
Conservative	Michael Vearncombe	1,257		
Labour	Hugh Robertson	300	15.6	
Liberal Democrats	David Brewin	294	15.3	
Liberal Democrats	Dick Taverne	284		
Labour	Paul McDermott	274		
Liberal Democrats	Thomas Kiehl	269		
Labour	David Worton	233		
Turnout			28.5	
Conservative hold		Swing		
Conservative hold		Swing		
Conservative hold		Swing		
