= 2010 Westminster City Council election =

- 6 May 2010

All 60 council seats of the Westminster City Council 31 seats needed for a majority
Council control before election
Conservative
Subsequent council control
Conservative

2010 City of Westminster Council Election Results Map. Conservatives in blue and Labour in red.

Elections for the City of Westminster London borough were held on 6 May 2010. The 2010 general election and other local elections took place on the same day.

In London council elections the entire council is elected every four years, as opposed to the local elections ‘by thirds’ in some areas of England, in which a third of the councillors are elected every year for three years and then no election is held in the fourth year.

The Conservatives retained control of the council, and all wards continued with the same party representation as at the previous borough election in 2006.

Labour did win back the Church Street seat they had lost to the Conservatives at a 2008 by-election, but the Results chart below shows, correctly, that there were no seat gains or losses for any Party at this election compared to the previous Westminster Council election of 2006.

== Results ==
Westminster Council election result 2010
Party	Seats	Gains	Losses	Net gain/loss	Seats %	Votes %	Votes	+/−
Conservative	48	0	0	0	80.0	42.7	36,929	
Labour	12	0	0	0	20.0	26.3	22,742	
Liberal Democrats	0	0	0	0	0.0	19.2	16,613	
Green	0	0	0	0	0.0	10.5	9,122	
UKIP	0	0	0	0	0.0	0.7	635	
Independent	0	0	0	0	0.0	0.5	394	
English Democrat	0	0	0	0	0.0	0.1	107	

== Ward results ==
The share of the vote for each candidate below is calculated as a percentage of the total voter turnout in each of the relevant wards. (A different percentage could be arrived at by calculating candidate vote shares as a relevant percentage of the total number of votes cast in each ward, given that each voter can cast up to three votes).

The majority number (and majority percentage) in each ward listed below is the margin of votes between the lowest-placed winning party candidate and the runner-up party's highest-placed losing candidate.

Candidates marked with an asterisk are the incumbent councillors.

=== Abbey Road ===
Abbey Road (3)
Party	Candidate	Votes	%	±%
Conservative	Lindsey Hall	2,533	61.7	
Conservative	Judith Warner*	2,361	57.5	
Conservative	Cyril Nemeth*	2,357	57.4	
Labour	Katharine Hoskyns	855	20.8	
Labour	Patrick Griffin	847	20.6	
Labour	Margherita Rendel	735	17.9	
Liberal Democrats	Kathleen Hobbins	652	15.9	
Liberal Democrats	Sophia Service	548	13.3	
Green	Ludovic Hunter-Tilney	436	10.6	
Majority		1,502	36.6	
Turnout		4,107	56.2	
Conservative hold		Swing		
Conservative hold		Swing		
Conservative hold		Swing		

=== Bayswater ===
Bayswater (3)
Party	Candidate	Votes	%	±%
Conservative	Brian Connell*	1,732	44.0	
Conservative	Michael Brahams*	1,719	43.7	
Conservative	Suhail Rahuja*	1,551	39.4	
Liberal Democrats	Mark Blackburn	1,173	29.8	
Liberal Democrats	Anthony Williams	1,150	29.3	
Liberal Democrats	John Coburn	1,097	27.9	
Labour	Sam Clark	964	24.5	
Labour	Naila Nielsen	815	20.7	
Labour	Jason Williams	712	18.1	
Majority		378	9.6	
Turnout		3,932	53.3	
Conservative hold		Swing		
Conservative hold		Swing		
Conservative hold		Swing		

=== Bryanston and Dorset Square ===
Bryanston and Dorset Square (3)
Party	Candidate	Votes	%	±%
Conservative	Richard Beddoe	1,993	52.4	
Conservative	Audrey Lewis*	1,990	52.4	
Conservative	Sheila d'Souza	1,965	51.7	
Liberal Democrats	Morag Beattie	810	21.3	
Labour	Brenda Buxton	747	19.7	
Liberal Democrats	Mark Oakley	728	19.2	
Liberal Democrats	Michael O'Heney Sibley	670	17.6	
Labour	David Obaze	666	17.5	
Labour	James Reid	621	16.3	
Green	Edward Scott-Clarke	475	12.5	
Majority		1,155	30.4	
Turnout		3,800	48.7	
Conservative hold		Swing		
Conservative hold		Swing		
Conservative hold		Swing		

=== Church Street ===
Church Street (3)
Party	Candidate	Votes	%	±%
Labour	Barbara Grahame*	2,138	51.4	
Labour	Ahmed Abdel-Hamid	1,920	46.2	
Labour	Abdul Toki*	1,832	44.0	
Conservative	Mehfuz Ahmed	1,234	29.7	
Conservative	Peter Cuthbertson	1,049	25.2	
Conservative	Fatima Mourad	921	22.1	
Liberal Democrats	Christopher Hall	714	17.2	
Liberal Democrats	Martin Thompson	625	15.0	
Green	Salahuddin Hamood	361	8.7	
Independent	Mohammed Amieur	271	6.5	
Majority		185	14.3	
Turnout		4,160	56.1	
Labour hold		Swing		
Labour hold		Swing		
Labour hold		Swing		

=== Churchill ===
Churchill (3)
Party	Candidate	Votes	%	±%
Conservative	Andrew Havery*	1,621	44.0	
Conservative	Sarah Richardson*	1,574	42.7	
Conservative	Nicholas Yarker*	1,549	42.1	
Labour	Jerome Saigol	1,062	28.8	
Labour	Markus Campbell-Savours	1,059	28.8	
Labour	Sammy Beedan	994	27.0	
Liberal Democrats	Naomi Smith	955	25.9	
Liberal Democrats	Paul Pettinger	885	24.0	
Liberal Democrats	Tim Mougenot	839	22.8	
Majority		487	13.3	
Turnout		3,683	56.8	
Conservative hold		Swing		
Conservative hold		Swing		
Conservative hold		Swing		

=== Harrow Road ===
Harrow Road (3)
Party	Candidate	Votes	%	±%
Labour	Ruth Bush*	2,730	60.0	
Labour	Guthrie McKie*	2,316	50.9	
Labour	Nilavra Mukerji	2,137	46.9	
Liberal Democrats	Andrew Pilkington	1,152	25.3	
Conservative	Thomas Crockett	1,120	24.6	
Conservative	Nasir Kassam	1,018	22.4	
Conservative	Rowsharana Moni	950	20.9	
Green	Roc Sandford	740	16.3	
UKIP	Jasna Badzak	218	4.8	
Majority		985	21.6	
Turnout		4,552	58.0	
Labour hold		Swing		
Labour hold		Swing		
Labour hold		Swing		

=== Hyde Park ===
Hyde Park (3)
Party	Candidate	Votes	%	±%
Conservative	Heather Acton	2,009	58.1	
Conservative	Colin Barrow*	1,903	55.0	
Conservative	Jean-Paul Floru*	1,851	53.5	
Liberal Democrats	Peter Crystal	1,393	40.3	
Green	Mark Cridge	1,016	29.4	
Liberal Democrats	Frank Mampaey	845	24.4	
Majority		458	13.2	
Turnout		3,459	45.5	
Conservative hold		Swing		
Conservative hold		Swing		
Conservative hold		Swing		

=== Knightsbridge and Belgravia ===
Knightsbridge and Belgravia (3)
Party	Candidate	Votes	%	±%
Conservative	Tony Devenish*	2,011	75.2	
Conservative	Philippa Roe*	2,003	74.9	
Conservative	Rachael Robathan	1,937	72.5	
Green	Thomas Bewley	712	26.6	
Majority		45.9	59.6	
Turnout		2,673	42.7	
Conservative hold		Swing		
Conservative hold		Swing		
Conservative hold		Swing		

=== Lancaster Gate ===
Lancaster Gate (3)
Party	Candidate	Votes	%	±%
Conservative	Susie Burbridge*	1,968	48.0	
Conservative	Robert Davis*	1,936	47.3	
Conservative	Andrew Smith	1,745	42.6	
Liberal Democrats	Sue Baring	930	22.7	
Labour	Muhammad Khan	787	19.2	
Labour	Liz Whitmore	775	18.9	
Labour	Alexandra Pardal	763	18.6	
Liberal Democrats	Monica Kendall	758	18.5	
Liberal Democrats	Andre Newburg	641	15.6	
Green	Zoe Young	455	11.1	
UKIP	Ryan Lavelle	102	2.5	
Majority		815	19.9	
Turnout		4,096	49.8	
Conservative hold		Swing		
Conservative hold		Swing		
Conservative hold		Swing		

=== Little Venice ===
Little Venice (3)
Party	Candidate	Votes	%	±%
Conservative	Melvyn Caplan*	1,966	48.3	
Conservative	Margaret Doyle*	1,920	47.2	
Conservative	Ian Adams*	1,884	46.3	
Labour	Mark Davies	1,291	31.7	
Labour	Aicha Less	1,020	25.1	
Labour	Romena Toki	907	22.3	
Liberal Democrats	Philip Wardle	676	16.6	
Liberal Democrats	Bahram Alimoradian	658	16.2	
Liberal Democrats	Roberto Ekholm	592	14.6	
Green	Lynnet Pready	442	10.9	
Majority		593	14.6	
Turnout		4,067	57.6	
Conservative hold		Swing		
Conservative hold		Swing		
Conservative hold		Swing		

=== Maida Vale ===
Maida Vale (3)
Party	Candidate	Votes	%	±%
Conservative	Jan Prendergast*	2,085	50.1	
Conservative	Alastair Moss*	1,794	43.1	
Conservative	Lee Rowley*	1,724	41.5	
Labour	Peter Denton	1,413	34.0	
Labour	John Edwards	1,193	28.7	
Labour	Ewan McGaughey	1,170	28.1	
Liberal Democrats	Marianne Magnin	806	19.4	
Liberal Democrats	Mark Gray	726	17.5	
Green	Peter Duke	569	13.7	
UKIP	Simon Seligmann	79	1.9	
Majority		311	7.5	
Turnout		4,159	57.8	
Conservative hold		Swing		
Conservative hold		Swing		
Conservative hold		Swing		

=== Marylebone High Street ===
Marylebone High Street (3)
Party	Candidate	Votes	%	±%
Conservative	Harvey Marshall*	2,080	61.7	
Conservative	Edward Baxter	1,911	56.7	
Conservative	Ian Rowley	1,899	56.4	
Liberal Democrats	Alistair Barr	1,231	36.5	
Liberal Democrats	Sonia Dunlop	1,122	33.3	
Green	Derek Chase	1,039	30.8	
Majority		668	19.9	
Turnout		3,369	48.3	
Conservative hold		Swing		
Conservative hold		Swing		
Conservative hold		Swing		

=== Queen's Park ===
Queen's Park (3)
Party	Candidate	Votes	%	±%
Labour	Patricia McAllister	2,843	60.1	
Labour	Paul Dimoldenberg*	2,622	55.4	
Labour	Barrie Taylor*	2,519	53.3	
Liberal Democrats	David Brewin	1,041	22.0	
Conservative	Koysor Ahmed	876	18.5	
Conservative	Rachid Boufas	823	17.4	
Conservative	Abdul Ahad	807	17.1	
Green	Susanna Rustin	780	16.5	
UKIP	Lulzim Beqiri	236	5.0	
Majority		1,478	31.3	
Turnout		4,729	58.8	
Labour hold		Swing		
Labour hold		Swing		
Labour hold		Swing		

=== Regent's Park ===
Regent's Park (3)
Party	Candidate	Votes	%	±%
Conservative	Daniel Astaire*	2,360	61.3	
Conservative	Gwyneth Hampson*	2,350	61.1	
Conservative	Robert Rigby	2,254	58.6	
Labour	Rupert d'Cruz	1,309	34.0	
Labour	Eram Ayub	1,292	33.6	
Labour	Victoria Wegg-Prosser	1,182	30.7	
Green	Tatyana Lee	642	16.7	
Majority		945	24.6	
Turnout		3,847	50.8	
Conservative hold		Swing		
Conservative hold		Swing		
Conservative hold		Swing		

=== St James's ===
St James's (3)
Party	Candidate	Votes	%	±%
Conservative	Louise Hyams*	1,896	48.9	
Conservative	Timothy Mitchell*	1,818	46.9	
Conservative	Cameron Thomson	1,714	44.2	
Liberal Democrats	Rachel Jagger	884	22.8	
Liberal Democrats	Jamie Wood	870	22.4	
Labour	Sally Bercow	868	22.4	
Labour	Mair Garside	714	18.4	
Labour	Vernon Hunte	690	17.8	
Green	Juliet Lyle	499	12.9	
Green	Peter Jackson	475	12.3	
Green	Benjamin Parker	329	8.5	
Majority		830	21.4	
Turnout		3,876	49.4	
Conservative hold		Swing		
Conservative hold		Swing		
Conservative hold		Swing		

=== Tachbrook ===
Tachbrook (3)
Party	Candidate	Votes	%	±%
Conservative	Alan Bradley*	2,092	56.2	
Conservative	Nick Evans*	1,992	53.5	
Conservative	Angela Harvey*	1,967	52.9	
Liberal Democrats	Rosalind Edwards	827	22.2	
Liberal Democrats	Jane Smithard	777	20.9	
Labour	Owain Garside	746	20.1	
Labour	Daphne Segre	723	19.4	
Liberal Democrats	Ben Mathis	701	18.8	
Labour	William Thomson	672	18.1	
Majority		1,140	30.7	
Turnout		3,720	58.8	
Conservative hold		Swing		
Conservative hold		Swing		
Conservative hold		Swing		

=== Vincent Square ===
Vincent Square (3)
Party	Candidate	Votes	%	±%
Conservative	David Harvey	2,131	53.0	
Conservative	Danny Chalkley*	2,095	52.1	
Conservative	Steven Summers*	2,021	50.3	
Liberal Democrats	Julie Porksen	948	23.6	
Liberal Democrats	Lindy Foord	926	23.0	
Labour	Tina Davy	873	21.7	
Labour	Peter Heap	809	20.1	
Labour	Alen Mathewson	802	20.0	
Liberal Democrats	Sandra Rapacioli	750	18.7	
Majority		1,073	26.7	
Turnout		4,018	55.7	
Conservative hold		Swing		
Conservative hold		Swing		
Conservative hold		Swing		

=== Warwick ===
Warwick (3)
Party	Candidate	Votes	%	±%
Conservative	Nickie Aiken*	2,407	59.7	
Conservative	Edward Argar*	2,302	57.1	
Conservative	Christabel Flight*	2,210	54.8	
Labour	Linda Davies	845	20.9	
Liberal Democrats	Paul Evans	836	20.7	
Liberal Democrats	Rhoda Torres	812	20.1	
Liberal Democrats	Adam Gillett	723	17.9	
Labour	Derek Buckland	722	17.9	
Labour	Gerard McFall	297	7.4	
Majority		1,365	33.9	
Turnout		4,034	56.2	
Conservative hold		Swing		
Conservative hold		Swing		
Conservative hold		Swing		

=== West End ===
West End (3)
Party	Candidate	Votes	%	±%
Conservative	Jonathan Glanz	1,648	50.5	
Conservative	Glenys Roberts*	1,557	47.7	
Conservative	Frixos Tombolis*	1,383	42.4	
Labour	David Bieda	813	24.9	
Liberal Democrats	Ian Steers	690	21.1	
Labour	Damian Dewhirst	686	21.0	
Labour	Ann Pettifor	657	20.1	
Liberal Democrats	Stephanie Taylor	641	19.6	
Liberal Democrats	Paul Morris	574	17.6	
Green	Cassandra Scott-Planer	429	13.1	
English Democrat	Frank Roseman	107	3.3	
Majority		570	17.5	
Turnout		3,265	49.7	
Conservative hold		Swing		
Conservative hold		Swing		
Conservative hold		Swing		

=== Westbourne ===
Westbourne (3)
Party	Candidate	Votes	%	±%
Labour	David Boothroyd*	2,458	56.0	
Labour	Adam Hug	2,318	52.8	
Labour	Papya Qureshi*	2,030	46.2	
Conservative	Duncan Flynn	1,167	26.6	
Conservative	Abhishek Majumdar	901	20.5	
Liberal Democrats	Christopher Gonzalez	895	20.4	
Conservative	Alex Walton	881	20.1	
Liberal Democrats	Joseph Magoon	683	15.6	
Green	Gary Hayes	527	12.0	
Independent	Abby Dharamsey	123	2.8	
Majority		863	19.6	
Turnout		4,391	53.0	
Labour hold		Swing		
Labour hold		Swing		
Labour hold		Swing		
