= 2014 Westminster City Council election =

2014 local election in England

- 22 May 2014

All 60 seats to Westminster City Council 31 seats needed for a majority
- Turnout: 32.3%

	First party	Second party
Party	Conservative	Labour
Last election	48 seats	12 seats
Seats won	44	16
Seat change	▼4	▲4
Popular vote	20,719	16,969
Percentage	41.0%	33.5%
- 2014 Westminster Borough Council Election Results Map Conservatives in blue and Labour in red.
Council control before election
Conservative
Council control after election
Conservative

The 2014 Westminster City Council election took place on 22 May 2014 to elect members of Westminster City Council in England. This was on the same day as other local elections.

== Overall results ==
The Conservatives retained control of the council, winning 44 seats (-4). Labour won 16 seats (+4), gaining all 3 seats in Churchill ward and 1 in Maida Vale from the Conservatives.

Westminster City Council Election Result 2014
Party	Seats	Gains	Losses	Net gain/loss	Seats %	Votes %	Votes	+/−
Conservative	44	0	4	-4	73.3	41.0	20,719	-1.7
Labour	16	4	0	+4	26.7	33.5	16,969	+7.2
Green	0	0	0	0	0.0	13.5	6,845	+3.0
Liberal Democrats	0	0	0	0	0.0	6.3	3,200	-12.9
UKIP	0	0	0	0	0.0	3.9	1,981	+3.2
Independent	0	0	0	0	0.0	1.7	877	+1.2

== Ward results ==
Candidate vote shares have been calculated as a percentage of the number of electors who voted in each ward.

The turnout figures listed below refer to the total numbers of votes cast in each relevant ward; each voter was entitled to cast up to three votes.

The ‘majority’ number is the margin of votes between the lowest-placed winning party candidate and the runner-up party's highest-placed losing candidate. Starred candidates are the incumbents.

=== Abbey Road ===
Abbey Road (3)
Party	Candidate	Votes	%	±%
Conservative	Lindsey Hall *	1,277	63.5	+1.8
Conservative	Judith Warner *	1,248	62.1	+4.6
Conservative	Peter Freeman	1,247	62.0	+4.6
Labour	Katharine Hoskyns	487	24.2	+3.4
Labour	Peter Denton	429	21.3	+0.7
Labour	Angelo Sommariva	359	17.9	±0.0
Green	Emmanuelle Tandy	265	13.2	+2.6
Liberal Democrats	Tilly Boulter	221	11.0	−4.9
Majority		760	37.8	
Turnout		5533	30.9	−25.3
Conservative hold		Swing		
Conservative hold		Swing		
Conservative hold		Swing		

=== Bayswater ===
Bayswater (3)
Party	Candidate	Votes	%	±%
Conservative	Brian Connell *	901	44.6	+0.6
Conservative	Richard Holloway	815	40.4	−3.3
Conservative	Suhail Rahuja *	795	39.4	±0.0
Liberal Democrats	Anthony Williams	508	25.2	−4.1
Liberal Democrats	Yuval Zommer	484	24.0	−3.9
Labour	Lauren Kay-Lambert	472	23.4	−1.1
Labour	Nathan Bennett	450	22.3	+1.6
Labour	Hussain Ahmed	406	20.1	+2.0
Liberal Democrats	Mark Blackburn	399	19.8	−10.0
Green	Louisa Acciari	376	18.6	N/A
Majority		287	14.2	
Turnout		5606	30.9	−25.3
Conservative hold		Swing		
Conservative hold		Swing		
Conservative hold		Swing		

=== Bryanston and Dorset Square ===
Bryanston and Dorset Square (3)
Party	Candidate	Votes	%	±%
Conservative	Audrey Lewis *	1,207	59.1	+6.7
Conservative	Richard Beddoe *	1,180	57.8	+5.4
Conservative	Adnan Mohammed	1,049	51.4	−0.3
Labour	Brenda Buxton	468	22.9	+3.2
Labour	Derek Buckland	415	20.3	+2.8
Labour	Mair Garside	391	19.1	+2.8
Green	Jennifer Nadel	381	18.7	+6.2
Liberal Democrats	Nicola Browne	286	14.0	−7.3
Liberal Democrats	Roger Lockyer	240	11.8	−7.4
Majority		581	28.5	
Turnout		5617	29.4	−19.3
Conservative hold		Swing		
Conservative hold		Swing		
Conservative hold		Swing		

=== Church Street ===
Church Street (3)
Party	Candidate	Votes	%	±%
Labour	Barbara Grahame *	1,854	68.4	+17.0
Labour	Aziz Toki *	1,602	59.1	+15.1
Labour	Vincenzo Rampulla	1,597	58.9	+12.7
Conservative	Isobel Bradley	495	18.3	−11.4
Conservative	Rachid Boufas	449	16.6	−8.6
Conservative	Lauren Hankinson	448	16.5	−5.6
Green	Marta Enflo	362	13.4	+4.7
Majority		1102	40.6	
Turnout		6807	34.8	−15.0
Labour hold		Swing		
Labour hold		Swing		
Labour hold		Swing		

=== Churchill ===
Churchill (3)
Party	Candidate	Votes	%	±%
Labour	Murad Gassanly	1,187	47.2	+18.4
Labour	Shamim Talukder	1,172	46.6	+17.8
Labour	Jason Williams	1,095	43.6	+16.6
Conservative	Andrew Havery *	1051	41.8	−2.2
Conservative	Jacqui Wilkinson	1018	40.5	−2.2
Conservative	Alex Pierre-Traves	981	39.0	−3.1
Green	George Mackie	308	12.3	N/A
Independent	Muhammad Uddin	251	10.0	N/A
Liberal Democrats	David Ewen	175	7.0	−18.9
Liberal Democrats	Rhoda Torres	175	7.0	−17.0
Majority		44	1.8	
Turnout		7413	41.8	−15.0
Labour gain from Conservative		Swing		
Labour gain from Conservative		Swing		
Labour gain from Conservative		Swing		

In July 2017, Murad Gassanly defected from Labour to the Conservative Party. This meant he sat as a Conservative councillor.

=== Harrow Road ===
Harrow Road (3)
Party	Candidate	Votes	%	±%
Labour	Ruth Bush *	1,788	70.3	+10.3
Labour	Guthrie McKie *	1,493	58.7	+7.8
Labour	Nilavra Mukerji *	1,415	55.6	+8.7
Conservative	Grazyna Green	546	21.5	−3.1
Green	Roc Sandford	464	18.2	+1.9
Conservative	Aline Nassif	406	16.0	−6.4
Conservative	Hartej Singh	349	13.7	−7.2
UKIP	Russ Kitching	308	12.1	+7.3
Majority		869	34.1	
Turnout		6769	32.9	−25.1
Labour hold		Swing		
Labour hold		Swing		
Labour hold		Swing		

=== Hyde Park ===
Hyde Park (3)
Party	Candidate	Votes	%	±%
Conservative	Heather Acton *	1,115	58.8	+0.7
Conservative	Antonia Cox *	1,114	58.8	+3.8
Conservative	JP Floru *	950	50.1	−3.4
Labour	Charles Mannan	565	29.8	N/A
Labour	Firase Morgan	493	26.0	N/A
Labour	Thomas Stephens	421	22.2	N/A
Green	Mark Cridge	261	13.8	−15.6
UKIP	Tara Collins	202	10.7	N/A
Majority		385	20.3	
Turnout		5121	26.6	−6.4
Conservative hold		Swing		
Conservative hold		Swing		
Conservative hold		Swing		

Results are compared with the 2010 election, not the 2012 by-election.

=== Knightsbridge and Belgravia ===
Knightsbridge and Belgravia (3)
Party	Candidate	Votes	%	±%
Conservative	Philippa Roe *	1,158	77.9	+3.0
Conservative	Rachael Robathan *	1,138	76.5	+4.0
Conservative	Tony Devenish *	1,114	74.9	−0.3
Green	Thomas Bewley	228	15.3	−11.3
Labour	Rosalyn Buckland	186	12.5	N/A
Labour	Joseph Blenkinsop	154	10.4	N/A
Labour	Thomas Williams	127	8.5	N/A
Majority		886	59.6	
Turnout		4105	26.3	−16.4
Conservative hold		Swing		
Conservative hold		Swing		
Conservative hold		Swing		

=== Lancaster Gate ===
Lancaster Gate (3)
Party	Candidate	Votes	%	±%
Conservative	Susie Burbridge *	1,262	58.6	+10.6
Conservative	Robert Davis *	1,152	53.5	+6.2
Conservative	Andrew Smith *	1,104	51.2	+8.6
Labour	Dafydd Elis	509	23.6	+4.4
Labour	Liz Whitmore	500	23.2	+4.3
Labour	Angela Piddock	496	23.0	+4.4
Green	Nicholas Figgis	340	15.8	+4.7
Liberal Democrats	Sue Baring	314	14.6	−8.1
Liberal Democrats	Thoby Kennet	229	10.6	−7.9
Majority		595	27.6	
Turnout		5906	29.9	−20.8
Conservative hold		Swing		
Conservative hold		Swing		
Conservative hold		Swing		

=== Little Venice ===
Little Venice (3)
Party	Candidate	Votes	%	±%
Conservative	Melvyn Caplan *	1,102	51.4	+3.1
Conservative	Ian Adams *	1,076	50.2	+3.9
Conservative	Barbara Arzymanow	1,075	50.2	+3.0
Labour	Sue Wolff	695	32.4	+0.7
Labour	Betty Moini	680	31.7	+9.4
Labour	Aicha Less	664	31.0	+5.9
Green	Lynnet Pready	346	16.2	+5.3
Liberal Democrats	Bahram Alimoradian	169	7.9	−8.3
Liberal Democrats	Roberto Ekholm	157	7.3	−7.3
Majority		380	17.8	
Turnout		5964	32.5	−25.1
Conservative hold		Swing		
Conservative hold		Swing		
Conservative hold		Swing		

=== Maida Vale ===
Maida Vale (3)
Party	Candidate	Votes	%	±%
Conservative	Jan Prendergast *	1,222	49.9	−0.2
Labour	Rita Begum	1,063	43.4	+9.4
Conservative	Thomas Crockett	1,063	43.4	+0.3
Conservative	Frixos Tombolis	902	36.8	−4.7
Labour	Eram Ayub	889	36.3	+7.6
Labour	Romena Toki	861	35.2	+7.1
Green	Peter Duke	399	16.3	+2.6
Liberal Democrats	Peter Welch	288	11.8	−7.6
Majority		161	6.6	
Turnout		6687	35.8	−22.0
Conservative hold		Swing		
Labour gain from Conservative		Swing		
Conservative hold		Swing		

=== Marylebone High Street ===
Marylebone High Street (3)
Party	Candidate	Votes	%	±%
Conservative	Iain Bott *	1,199	64.8	+3.1
Conservative	Ian Rowley *	1,145	61.9	+5.5
Conservative	Karen Scarborough	1,075	58.1	+1.4
Labour	Madge Cavalla	343	18.5	N/A
Labour	Owain Garside	315	17.0	N/A
Green	Hugh Small	306	16.5	−14.3
Labour	Peter Cavalla	275	14.9	N/A
Liberal Democrats	Alistair Barr	220	11.9	−24.6
Liberal Democrats	Sally Sampson	182	9.8	−23.5
Liberal Democrats	Haude Lannon	127	6.9	N/A
Majority		732	39.6	
Turnout		5187	28.8	−19.5
Conservative hold		Swing		
Conservative hold		Swing		
Conservative hold		Swing		

Results are compared with the 2010 election, not the 2013 by-election.

=== Queen's Park ===
Queen's Park (3)
Party	Candidate	Votes	%	±%
Labour	Patricia McAllister *	1,921	69.9	+9.8
Labour	Paul Dimoldenberg *	1,844	67.1	+11.7
Labour	Barrie Taylor *	1,805	65.7	+12.4
Conservative	Matthew Green	545	19.8	+1.3
Green	Jurgen Huber	454	16.5	±0.0
Conservative	Abdul Ahad	403	14.7	−2.4
Conservative	Eliza Richardson	385	14.0	−3.4
Majority		1260	45.9	
Turnout		6866	35.4	−23.4
Labour hold		Swing		
Labour hold		Swing		
Labour hold		Swing		

=== Regent's Park ===
Regent's Park (3)
Party	Candidate	Votes	%	±%
Conservative	Daniel Astaire *	1,215	54.2	−7.1
Conservative	Robert Rigby *	1,187	52.9	−5.7
Conservative	Gotz Mohindra	1,042	46.5	−14.6
Labour	Dorothy Edwin	800	35.7	+1.7
Labour	Ahmed Hamid	677	30.2	−3.4
Labour	Nicholas Luder	667	29.8	−0.9
Green	Jacqueline Dent	324	14.5	−2.2
Liberal Democrats	Herbert Hartwell	219	9.8	N/A
Majority		242	10.8	
Turnout		6131	31.2	−19.6
Conservative hold		Swing		
Conservative hold		Swing		
Conservative hold		Swing		

=== St James's ===
St James's (3)
Party	Candidate	Votes	%	±%
Conservative	Louise Hyams *	1,038	48.5	−0.4
Conservative	Timothy Mitchell *	1,011	47.2	+0.3
Conservative	Cameron Thomson *	955	44.6	+0.4
Labour	David Lumby	591	27.6	+5.2
Labour	Tim Roca	539	25.2	+6.8
Labour	Fraser Welsh	475	22.2	+4.4
Green	Juliet Lyle	335	15.6	+2.7
UKIP	Silvia Le Marchant	299	14.0	N/A
Liberal Democrats	Steven Cheung	228	10.6	−12.2
Liberal Democrats	Paul Pettinger	206	9.6	−12.8
Liberal Democrats	Paul Thompson	191	8.9	N/A
Majority		364	17.0	
Turnout		5868	29.6	−19.8
Conservative hold		Swing		
Conservative hold		Swing		
Conservative hold		Swing		

=== Tachbrook ===
Tachbrook (3)
Party	Candidate	Votes	%	±%
Conservative	Nick Evans *	1,103	50.0	−3.5
Conservative	Angela Harvey *	1,095	49.6	−3.3
Conservative	Peter Cuthbertson	1,093	49.5	−6.7
Labour	Gillian Guy	568	25.7	+5.6
Labour	Joe Darrall	537	24.3	+4.9
Labour	William Thomson	493	22.3	+4.2
UKIP	Krystal Painter	274	12.4	N/A
Green	Conrad Rubin	268	12.1	N/A
Liberal Democrats	Elizabeth Armstrong	231	10.5	−11.7
Liberal Democrats	Pippa Johnson	200	9.1	−11.8
Liberal Democrats	Tim Mougenot	132	6.0	−12.8
Majority		525	23.8	
Turnout		5994	37.4	−21.4
Conservative hold		Swing		
Conservative hold		Swing		
Conservative hold		Swing		

=== Vincent Square ===
Vincent Square (3)
Party	Candidate	Votes	%	±%
Conservative	David Harvey *	1,364	52.1	−0.9
Conservative	Danny Chalkley *	1,305	49.8	−2.3
Conservative	Steve Summers *	1,256	48.0	−2.3
Labour	Sarah Macri	789	30.1	+8.4
Labour	Peter Heap	758	28.9	+8.8
Labour	Alen Mathewson	686	26.2	+6.2
Green	Katherine Harrison	448	17.1	N/A
UKIP	Peter Benmax	327	12.5	N/A
Independent	Wilfried Rimensberger	279	10.7	N/A
Majority		467	17.9	
Turnout		7212	36.5	−19.2
Conservative hold		Swing		
Conservative hold		Swing		
Conservative hold		Swing		

=== Warwick ===
Warwick (3)
Party	Candidate	Votes	%	±%
Conservative	Nickie Aiken *	1,419	60.6	+0.9
Conservative	Edward Argar *	1,323	56.5	−0.6
Conservative	Christabel Flight *	1,257	53.7	−1.1
Labour	Georgina Newson	517	22.1	+1.2
Labour	Nurul Islam	452	19.3	+1.4
Labour	Andrew Taylor	449	19.2	+11.8
Green	Benjamin Parker	290	12.4	N/A
UKIP	Jonathan Munday	265	11.3	N/A
Liberal Democrats	Keith Dugmore	189	8.1	−12.6
Liberal Democrats	Jane Smithard	181	7.7	−12.4
Liberal Democrats	Mark Platt	166	7.1	−10.8
Majority		740	32.6	
Turnout		6508	35.4	−20.8
Conservative hold		Swing		
Conservative hold		Swing		
Conservative hold		Swing		

=== West End ===
West End (3)
Party	Candidate	Votes	%	±%
Conservative	Paul Church	1,027	54.9	+12.5
Conservative	Glenys Roberts *	914	48.9	+1.2
Conservative	Jonathan Glanz *	865	46.3	−4.2
Labour	Katherine Cook	453	24.2	−0.7
Labour	Michael Dumigan	435	23.3	+3.2
Labour	Damian Dewhirst	393	21.0	±0.0
Independent	Andrew Murray	347	18.6	N/A
Green	Anton de Beristain Humphrey	309	16.5	+3.4
Liberal Democrats	Alan Ravenscroft	152	8.1	−13.0
Liberal Democrats	Sophie Sperry	145	7.8	−11.8
Majority		412	22.1	
Turnout		5040	29.9	−19.8
Conservative hold		Swing		
Conservative hold		Swing		
Conservative hold		Swing		

=== Westbourne ===
Westbourne (3)
Party	Candidate	Votes	%	±%
Labour	David Boothroyd *	1,713	67.2	+11.2
Labour	Adam Hug *	1,695	66.4	+13.6
Labour	Papya Qureshi *	1,563	61.3	+15.1
Conservative	Richard Clode	473	18.5	−8.1
Conservative	Henry Shelford	402	15.8	−4.7
Conservative	Iheoma Oteh	398	15.6	−4.5
Green	Ludovic Hunter-Tilney	381	14.9	+2.9
UKIP	Maggie Casey	306	12.0	N/A
Majority		1090	42.8	
Turnout		6931	32.1	−20.9
Labour hold		Swing		
Labour hold		Swing		
Labour hold		Swing		

== 2014-2018 by-elections ==
Warwick by-election, 7 May 2015 (Note: This was the same day as the 2015 general election.)
Party	Candidate	Votes	%	±%
Conservative	Jacqui Wilkinson	2,397	62.7	+10.2
Labour	Sophia Eglin	1,216	31.8	+13.2
UKIP	Mohammad Ali	207	5.4	−5.0
Majority		1,181	30.9	−3.0
Turnout		3,862	57.92	+22.5
Conservative hold		Swing		

The by-election was called following the resignation of Cllr Edward Argar.

Harrow Road by-election, 23 July 2015
Party	Candidate	Votes	%	±%
Labour	Tim Roca	1,139	75.4	+18.9
Conservative	Wilford Augustus	334	22.1	+6.4
UKIP	Jill De Quincey	38	2.5	−8.6
Majority		805	53.3	+13.5
Turnout		1,511	19.4	−13.5
Labour hold		Swing		

The by-election was called following the resignation of Cllr. Nilavra Mukerji.

Bryanston and Dorset Square by-election, 22 October 2015
Party	Candidate	Votes	%	±%
Conservative	Julia Alexander	582	49.7	−2.0
Baker Street: No Two Ways	Steve Dollond	218	18.6	+18.6
Labour	Ananthi Paskaralingam	167	14.3	−4.9
Green	Hugh Small	116	9.9	−7.3
Liberal Democrats	Martin Thompson	46	3.9	−8.0
UKIP	Jill De Quincey	42	3.6	+3.6
Majority		364	31.1	−1.4
Turnout		1,171	17.9	−11.5
Conservative hold		Swing		

The by-election was called following the death of Cllr Audrey Lewis.

Church Street by-election, 5 May 2016 (Note: This was the same day as the 2016 London mayoral election.)
Party	Candidate	Votes	%	±%
Labour	Aicha Less	2,174	70.3	+3.2
Conservative	Rachid Boufas	512	16.6	−1.9
Liberal Democrats	Alistair Barr	205	6.6	+6.6
UKIP	Jill De Quincey	175	5.7	+5.7
Pirate	Andreas Habeland	26	0.8	+0.8
Majority		1,662	53.7	+5.1
Turnout		3,151	45	+10.2
Labour hold		Swing		

The by-election was called following the resignation of Cllr Vincenzo Rampulla.

== See also ==
- 2014 Queen's Park Community Council election held the same day
