= Philippa Roe, Baroness Couttie =

British politician (1962–2022)

The Right Honourable The Baroness Couttie
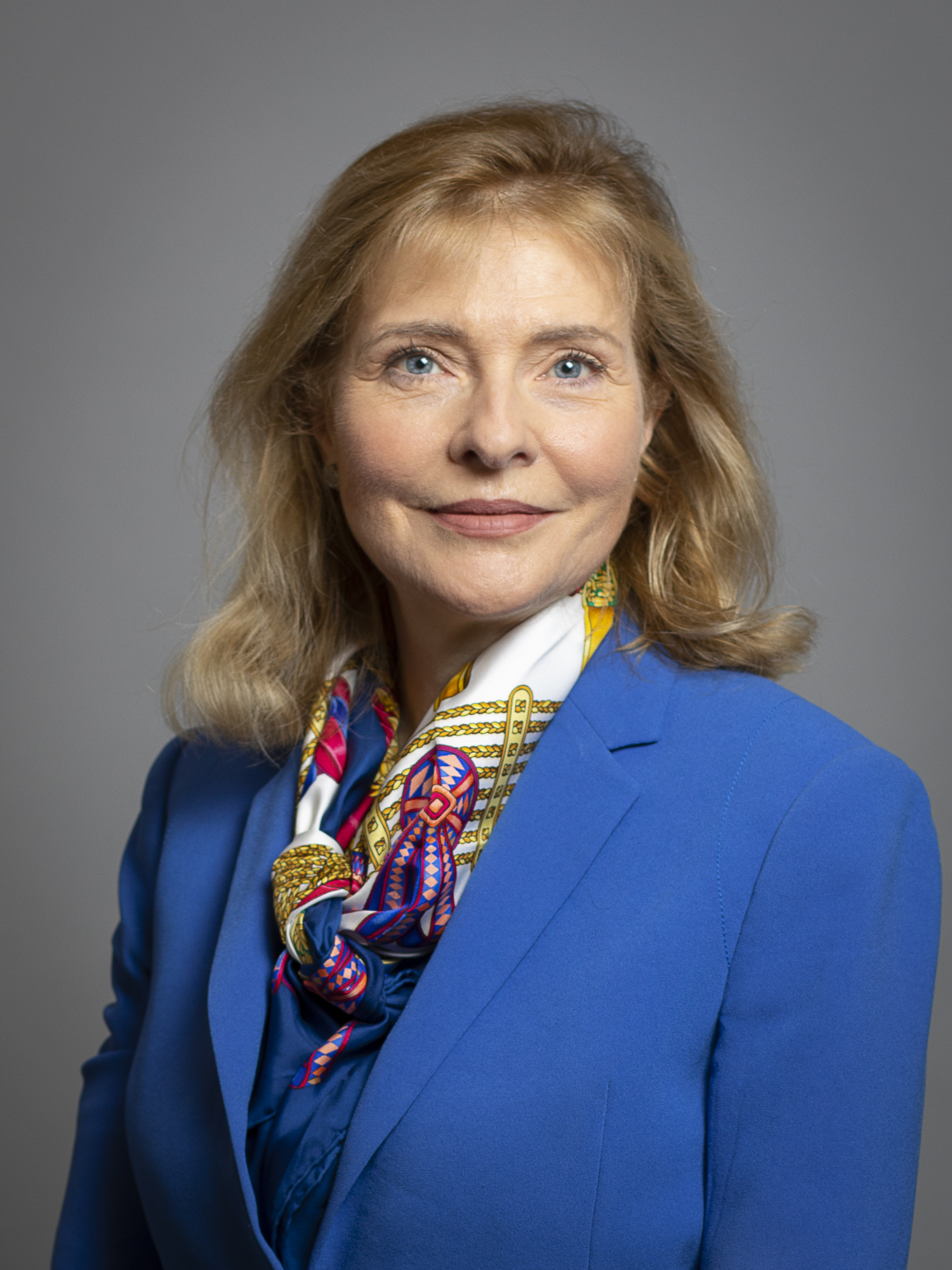
- Official portrait, 2019

Leader of Westminster City Council
- In office 4 March 2012 – 26 January 2017
- Preceded by: Colin Barrow
- Succeeded by: Nickie Aiken

Member of the House of Lords
- Lord Temporal
- Life peerage 5 September 2016 – 12 December 2022

Councillor (Knightsbridge and Belgravia Ward)
- In office 2006–2014

Personal details
- Born: Philippa Marion Roe; 25 September 1962 Hampstead, London, England
- Died: 12 December 2022 (aged 60)
- Party: Conservative
- Spouses: John Ricketts (before 2002); Stephen Couttie (m. 2002)
- Children: 2
- Parent: James Kenneth Roe
- Education: University of St Andrews (MA)
- Occupation: Investment banker; politician

Philippa Marion Roe, Baroness Couttie (25 September 1962 – 12 December 2022) was a British Conservative politician, who served as Leader of Westminster City Council from 2012 to 2017. Before entering public life she was an investment banker with Citigroup.

== Early life and education ==
Born in Hampstead and educated at the University of St Andrews, Roe was a director of Citigroup before entering politics in 2006. The daughter of James Roe and former Conservative MP Dame Marion Roe, Philippa had a younger sister and younger brother. In 1982, she became the first student in 572 years to be elected to the University of St Andrews Senate, the institution's governing body.

== Career ==
After leaving university, Roe began her career in the public relations industry, joining Burson Marsteller.

In the 1990s, she served on a panel of experts from the private sector consulted by the Conservative government in establishing the private finance initiative, and in 2004 Roe was the joint author of a report called "Reforming the Private Finance Initiative", published by the Centre for Policy Studies.

Roe gave up her job at Citigroup when she became the mother of twins. In 2006, soon after this, Roe was elected to Westminster City Council, representing the three-member Knightsbridge and Belgravia ward, a safe seat for her party. At that time, she had recently recovered from cancer.

She was appointed a governor of Imperial College London and in 2008 became the member of Westminster's cabinet for Housing. In May 2010, Roe was re-elected as a councillor, and in June that year, she stated her support for the new coalition government's decision to cap housing benefit at £400 a week. In 2011, she took on the cabinet portfolio of Strategic Finance. The next year she succeeded Colin Barrow as Leader of the council, beating Edward Argar for the nomination, and quickly distanced herself from a comparison with a predecessor, Dame Shirley Porter.

The same year, she took over the role of chairman of the statutory Health and Wellbeing Board for Westminster. She also sat on the London Enterprise Panel. In 2013, she was quoted as saying that "local people know best" and that "The funding challenge is an opportunity to break free of orthodoxy and review all the services provided and how they can be delivered more efficiently."

She was re-elected as a councillor in 2014 and topped the poll, with the Conservative ward candidates taking 79.6 per cent of the vote. She did not stand as a councillor at the 2018 election.

In July 2015, Roe announced that she was seeking her party's nomination to stand as Mayor of London at the May 2016 election. However, she was not shortlisted by the Conservatives.

Roe was nominated for a life peerage in David Cameron's Resignation Honours and was created Baroness Couttie, of Downe in the County of Kent, on 5 September 2016. Couttie was the surname of her husband Stephen.

== Personal life and death ==
Roe married Stephen Couttie, a partner in the private equity firm Collabrium Capital, in September 2002. After fertility treatment in the United States, she gave birth to twins, Angus and Genevieve (Evie), in August 2005.

Baroness Couttie died of cancer on 12 December 2022, at the age of 60. Several of her former council colleagues paid tribute to her.
