= 2006 Westminster City Council election =

← 2002	4 May 2006	2010 →

All 60 seats to Westminster City Council 31 seats needed for a majority
	First party	Second party
Party	Conservative	Labour
Seats won	48	12
Seat change	0	0
Popular vote	24,190	10,172
Percentage	56.4%	23.7%
Swing	▲0.9%	▼4.3%
- Map of the results of the 2006 Westminster council election. Conservatives in blue and Labour in red.
Council control before election
Conservative
Council control after election
Conservative

The 2006 Westminster City Council election took place on 4 May 2006 to elect members of Westminster City Council in London, England. The whole council was up for election and the Conservative Party remained in control of the council with no seat changes between the Conservatives and Labour.

== Election result ==
Westminster local election result 2006
Party	Seats	Gains	Losses	Net gain/loss	Seats %	Votes %	Votes	+/−
Conservative	48	0	0	0	80.0	56.4	24,190	▲0.9
Labour	12	0	0	0	20.0	23.7	10,172	▼4.3
Liberal Democrats	0	0	0	0	0.0	16.5	7,059	▲3.1
Green	0	0	0	0	0.0	1.5	623	0.0
Respect	0	0	0	0	0.0	1.3	565	New
Independent	0	0	0	0	0.0	0.5	209	New
UKIP	0	0	0	0	0.0	0.2	67	New

== Ward results ==
=== Abbey Road ===
Abbey Road (3)
Party	Candidate	Votes	%	±%
Conservative	Judith Warner	1,490	68.9	
Conservative	Cyril Nemeth	1,483		
Conservative	Kevin Gardner	1,456		
Liberal Democrats	Robert Bell	345	16.0	
Liberal Democrats	Elizabeth Wheeler	330		
Labour	Katharine Hoskyns	326	15.1	
Labour	Margherita Rendel	306		
Labour	Patrick Griffin	302		
Liberal Democrats	Gareth Evans	281		
Turnout			30.9	
Conservative hold		Swing		
Conservative hold		Swing		
Conservative hold		Swing		

=== Bayswater ===
Bayswater (3)
Party	Candidate	Votes	%	±%
Conservative	Michael Brahams	1,107	50.2	
Conservative	Brian Connell	1,100		
Conservative	Suhail Rahuja	1,035		
Liberal Democrats	Susan Baring	768	34.8	
Liberal Democrats	Benjamin Way	644		
Liberal Democrats	Martin Thompson	627		
Labour	Damian Kahya	330	15.0	
Labour	Enid Whitehead	319		
Labour	Assiya Yousef	316		
Turnout			30.6	
Conservative hold		Swing		
Conservative hold		Swing		
Conservative hold		Swing		

=== Bryanston and Dorset Square ===
Bryanston and Dorset Square (3)
Party	Candidate	Votes	%	±%
Conservative	Carolyn Keen	1,266	57.6	
Conservative	Audrey Lewis	1,250		
Conservative	Angela Hooper	1,187		
Green	Heber Micelli	352	16.0	
Liberal Democrats	Stuart Bonar	317	14.4	
Liberal Democrats	Neil Balmer	263		
Labour	Brenda Buxton	262	11.9	
Liberal Democrats	Andrew Pilkington	256		
Labour	Derek Buckland	247		
Labour	Ian Deacon	233		
Turnout			27.2	
Conservative hold		Swing		
Conservative hold		Swing		
Conservative hold		Swing		

=== Church Street ===
Church Street (3)
Party	Candidate	Votes	%	±%
Labour	Abdul Toki	1,099	39.5	
Labour	Barbara Grahame	1,078		
Labour	Antony Mothersdale	979		
Conservative	Abdus Hamid	807	29.0	
Conservative	Mesbah Uddin	794		
Conservative	Alexander Shaw	663		
Respect	Yvonne Ridley	565	20.3	
Liberal Democrats	Jacqueline Castles	310	11.1	
Liberal Democrats	Paul Evans	278		
Liberal Democrats	Artemis Nicolaou	209		
Turnout			34.6	
Labour hold		Swing		
Labour hold		Swing		
Labour hold		Swing		

=== Churchill ===
Churchill (3)
Party	Candidate	Votes	%	±%
Conservative	Sarah Richardson	1,411	59.3	
Conservative	Andrew Havery	1,393		
Conservative	Nicholas Yarker	1,339		
Labour	Alastair Dick	669	28.1	
Labour	Matthew Williams	612		
Labour	Luke Pollard	599		
Liberal Democrats	Michael Holmans	298	12.5	
Liberal Democrats	Albert Kemp	285		
Liberal Democrats	Rhoda Torres	275		
Turnout			38.7	
Conservative hold		Swing		
Conservative hold		Swing		
Conservative hold		Swing		

=== Harrow Road ===
Harrow Road (3)
Party	Candidate	Votes	%	±%
Labour	Ruth Bush	1,036	52.6	
Labour	Guthrie McKie	899		
Labour	Sharan Tabari	877		
Conservative	Mehfuz Ahmed	523	26.5	
Conservative	Peter Prendergast	520		
Conservative	Christopher Lees	520		
Liberal Democrats	Shamsu Miah	411	20.9	
Liberal Democrats	Peter Dunphy	369		
Liberal Democrats	Winston Fletcher	325		
Turnout			26.0	
Labour hold		Swing		
Labour hold		Swing		
Labour hold		Swing		

=== Hyde Park ===
Hyde Park (3)
Party	Candidate	Votes	%	±%
Conservative	Pamela Batty	1,230	66.7	
Conservative	Colin Barrow	1,194		
Conservative	Jean-Paul Floru	1,176		
Liberal Democrats	Warren Edwardes	335	18.2	
Liberal Democrats	Jane Smithard	289		
Labour	Louis Al-Dhahir	278	15.1	
Labour	Corey Lee Koo	267		
Liberal Democrats	Esther Stansfield	264		
Labour	Joseph Ogden	260		
Turnout			36.5	
Conservative hold		Swing		
Conservative hold		Swing		
Conservative hold		Swing		

=== Knightsbridge and Belgravia ===
Knightsbridge and Belgravia (3)
Party	Candidate	Votes	%	±%
Conservative	Elizabeth Blois	1,272	84.1	
Conservative	Philippa Roe	1,270		
Conservative	Anthony Devenish	1,263		
Liberal Democrats	Rachel Jagger	145	9.6	
Liberal Democrats	Elke Ulmer-Kracht	135		
Liberal Democrats	Patrick Leavey	131		
Labour	Josephine Abercrombie	95	6.3	
Labour	Margaret Cavalla	79		
Labour	Peter Cavalla	66		
Turnout			25.2	
Conservative hold		Swing		
Conservative hold		Swing		
Conservative hold		Swing		

=== Lancaster Gate ===
Lancaster Gate (3)
Party	Candidate	Votes	%	±%
Conservative	Susan Burbridge	1,270	64.7	
Conservative	Robert Davis	1,258		
Conservative	Simon Milton	1,218		
Liberal Democrats	Mark Gray	348	17.7	
Labour	Amia Ismail	346	17.6	
Liberal Democrats	Monica Wilson	335		
Labour	Tony Rea	330		
Liberal Democrats	Margaret Nicholson	326		
Labour	Victoria Wegg-Prosser	323		
Turnout			24.5	
Conservative hold		Swing		
Conservative hold		Swing		
Conservative hold		Swing		

=== Little Venice ===
Little Venice (3)
Party	Candidate	Votes	%	±%
Conservative	Melvyn Caplan	1,266	63.8	
Conservative	Margaret Doyle	1,248		
Conservative	Ian Adams	1,246		
Labour	David Obaze	405	20.4	
Labour	John Edwards	402		
Labour	Andrew Blick	399		
Liberal Democrats	Jonathan Wardle	312	15.7	
Liberal Democrats	Jeremy Swan	281		
Liberal Democrats	Philip Wardle	271		
Turnout			29.1	
Conservative hold		Swing		
Conservative hold		Swing		
Conservative hold		Swing		

=== Maida Vale ===
Maida Vale (3)
Party	Candidate	Votes	%	±%
Conservative	Jan Prendergast	1,489	64.2	
Conservative	Alastair Moss	1,406		
Conservative	Lee Rowley	1,357		
Labour	Mark Davies	535	23.1	
Labour	Peter Denton	522		
Labour	Adam Kravitz	497		
Liberal Democrats	Anne Couchman	294	12.7	
Liberal Democrats	Neville Farmer	263		
Liberal Democrats	Zena Lutrin	247		
Turnout			33.2	
Conservative hold		Swing		
Conservative hold		Swing		
Conservative hold		Swing		

=== Marylebone High Street ===
Marylebone High Street (3)
Party	Candidate	Votes	%	±%
Conservative	Harvey Marshall	1,333	69.2	
Conservative	Mark Page	1,264		
Conservative	Michael Vearncombe	1,257		
Labour	Hugh Robertson	300	15.6	
Liberal Democrats	David Brewin	294	15.3	
Liberal Democrats	Dick Taverne	284		
Labour	Paul McDermott	274		
Liberal Democrats	Thomas Kiehl	269		
Labour	David Worton	233		
Turnout			28.5	
Conservative hold		Swing		
Conservative hold		Swing		
Conservative hold		Swing		

=== Queen's Park ===
Queen's Park (3)
Party	Candidate	Votes	%	±%
Labour	Barrie Taylor	1,156	52.5	
Labour	Mushtaq Qureshi	1,114		
Labour	Paul Dimoldenberg	1,113		
Conservative	Koysor Ahmed	660	29.9	
Conservative	Mian Afzal	644		
Conservative	Abeer Maghribi	563		
Liberal Democrats	James Oates	388	17.6	
Liberal Democrats	Susan Stephen	365		
Liberal Democrats	Nigel Bliss	356		
Turnout			29.4	
Labour hold		Swing		
Labour hold		Swing		
Labour hold		Swing		

=== Regent's Park ===
Regent's Park (3)
Party	Candidate	Votes	%	±%
Conservative	Daniel Astaire	1,441	65.8	
Conservative	Gwyneth Hampson	1,412		
Conservative	Timothy Joiner	1,386		
Labour	Seana De Carne	432	19.7	
Labour	Paul Thompson	401		
Labour	Francis Prideaux	367		
Liberal Democrats	Herbert Hartwell	317	14.5	
Liberal Democrats	Sophia Service	279		
Liberal Democrats	Marianne Taylor	262		
Turnout			29.8	
Conservative hold		Swing		
Conservative hold		Swing		
Conservative hold		Swing		

=== St James's ===
St James's (3)
Party	Candidate	Votes	%	±%
Conservative	Timothy Mitchell	1,304	64.0	
Conservative	Louise Hyams	1,290		
Conservative	Alexander Nicoll	1,216		
Labour	David Cole	372	18.3	
Liberal Democrats	Marie-Louise Rossi	360	17.7	
Labour	Mair Garside	343		
Labour	Owain Garside	335		
Liberal Democrats	David Hughes	307		
Liberal Democrats	John Stevens	305		
Turnout			29.8	
Conservative hold		Swing		
Conservative hold		Swing		
Conservative hold		Swing		

=== Tachbrook ===
Tachbrook (3)
Party	Candidate	Votes	%	±%
Conservative	Alan Bradley	1,504	63.3	
Conservative	Angela Harvey	1,475		
Conservative	Nicholas Evans	1,464		
Labour	Hatty Cadman	494	20.8	
Labour	Markus Campbell-Savours	454		
Labour	William Thomson	451		
Liberal Democrats	Victoria Adamson	378	15.9	
Liberal Democrats	Josephine Hayes	327		
Liberal Democrats	David Wilks	285		
Turnout			36.5	
Conservative hold		Swing		
Conservative hold		Swing		
Conservative hold		Swing		

=== Vincent Square ===
Vincent Square (3)
Party	Candidate	Votes	%	±%
Conservative	Duncan Sandys	1,596	64.7	
Conservative	Steven Summers	1,563		
Conservative	Danny Chalkley	1,544		
Labour	Gillian Guy	457	18.5	
Labour	Peter Heap	422		
Liberal Democrats	Margaret Lang	415	16.8	
Labour	Alen Mathewson	411		
Liberal Democrats	Janice Taverne	355		
Liberal Democrats	Kathleen Hobbins	354		
Turnout			35.2	
Conservative hold		Swing		
Conservative hold		Swing		
Conservative hold		Swing		

=== Warwick ===
Warwick (3)
Party	Candidate	Votes	%	±%
Conservative	Nicola Aiken	1,608	70.5	
Conservative	Edward Argar	1,560		
Conservative	Christabel Flight	1,500		
Liberal Democrats	Anthony Brett-Jones	362	15.9	
Labour	Linda Davies	310	13.6	
Liberal Democrats	Melissa Foux	287		
Labour	Lynda Giddings	267		
Liberal Democrats	Panayiota Nicolaou	262		
Labour	Daphne Segre	261		
Turnout			32.6	
Conservative hold		Swing		
Conservative hold		Swing		
Conservative hold		Swing		

=== West End ===
West End (3)
Party	Candidate	Votes	%	±%
Conservative	Glenys Roberts	1,011	50.5	
Conservative	Ian Wilder	958		
Conservative	Frixos Tombolis	883		
Labour	David Bieda	379	18.9	
Labour	Damian Dewhirst	298		
Liberal Democrats	Morag Beattie	275	13.7	
Green	Tristan Smith	271	13.5	
Liberal Democrats	Ian Steers	263		
Labour	Alon Or-Bach	261		
Liberal Democrats	Mark Blackburn	219		
UKIP	Colin Merton	67	3.3	
Turnout			25.8	
Conservative hold		Swing		
Conservative hold		Swing		
Conservative hold		Swing		

=== Westbourne ===
Westbourne (3)
Party	Candidate	Votes	%	±%
Labour	David Boothroyd	891	42.7	
Labour	Vinod D'Cruz	837		
Labour	Papya Qureshi	750		
Conservative	Paul Miller	602	28.8	
Conservative	Robert Rigby	542		
Conservative	Flossy Keelson-Anfu	541		
Liberal Democrats	Stephanie Taylor	387	18.5	
Liberal Democrats	Anthony Williams	321		
Liberal Democrats	Vera Williams	298		
Independent	Abdulla Dharamsi	209	10.0	
Turnout			24.4	
Labour hold		Swing		
Labour hold		Swing		
Labour hold		Swing		
