= Jessica Toale =

British Labour Party politician

Jessica Toale MP
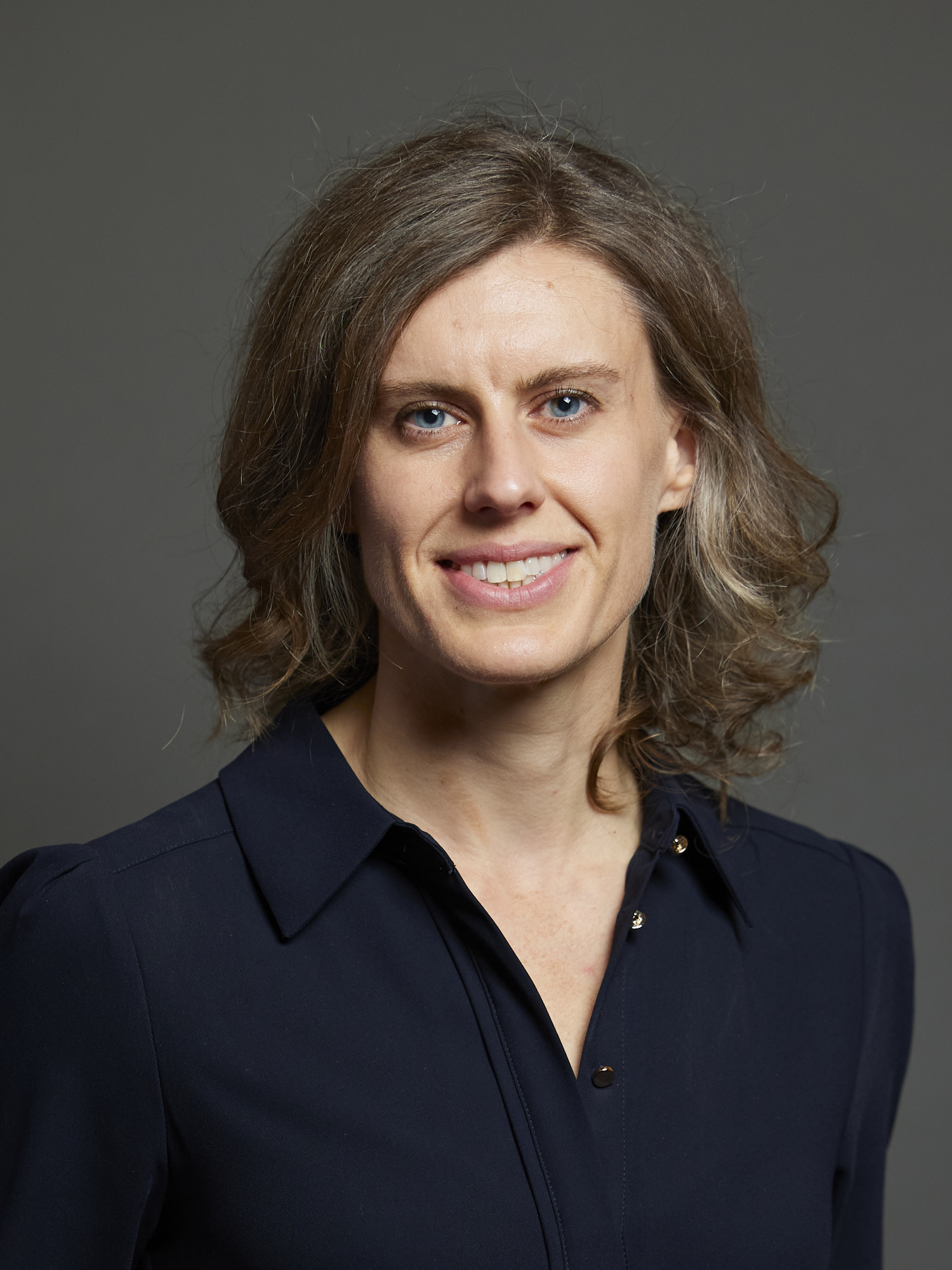
- Official portrait, 2024

Member of Parliament for Bournemouth West
- Incumbent
- Assumed office 4 July 2024
- Preceded by: Conor Burns
- Majority: 3,224 (8.2%)

Member of Westminster City Council for West End
- In office 5 May 2022 – 20 August 2024
- Succeeded by: Tim Barnes

Personal details
- Party: Labour

Jessica Jade Toale (born May 1986, Southampton) is a British Labour Party politician serving as Member of Parliament (MP) for Bournemouth West since 2024.

== Career ==
Toale attended the University of York, graduating with a degree in Philosophy, Politics and Economics. She went on to do a master's degree in Urbanisation and Development at the London School of Economics and Political Science.

Toale has worked as a policy adviser and consultant for NGOs, universities and United Nations agencies. She was a political advisor to Labour MP Ivan Lewis from 2011 to 2013, in his role as Shadow Secretary of State for International Development and later Northern Ireland. Toale co-founded the Labour Foreign Policy Group in 2020. In 2016, she was on the Labour shortlist for candidates in the 2016 Richmond Park by-election. She was previously a member of the Young Fabians executive committee.

She was elected as a Member of Westminster City Council for West End in 2022, and subsequently appointed Deputy Cabinet Member for Culture, Heritage and the Arts.

Toale was elected as MP for Bournemouth West at the 2024 general election, defeating incumbent Conor Burns to become its first non-Conservative representative. She had previously contested the Labour candidacy for the 2016 Richmond Park by-election without success. On 20 August 2024, she resigned her seat on Westminster City Council. On 20 September 2024, the local by-election for her vacated council seat was won by Conservative candidate Tim Barnes.

In the Starmer ministry, Toale serves as Parliamentary Private Secretary to the Foreign, Commonwealth and Development Office.

== Political opinions ==
Toale supports allowing Votes at 16.

Toale opposed a leadership challenge against Keir Starmer in May 2026.
