= 1998 Westminster City Council election =

1998 local election in England

- 7 May 1998

All 60 council seats up for election to the Westminster City Council 31 seats needed for a majority
- Registered: 126,280
- Turnout: 40,398, 31.99% (▼14.11)

| | First party | Second party | Third party |
|---|---|---|---|
| Leader | Melvyn B. Caplan | Alan G. Lazarus | Unknown |
| Party | Conservative | Labour | Liberal Democrats |
| Leader since | 1995 | 1 May 1997 (Note: Lazarus became acting leader of the Labour Group on this day and became the official leader in July of that year) | Unknown |
| Leader's seat | Little Venice | Harrow Road | N/A (Note: No Liberal Democrats had a seat on the council before or after the election) |
| Last election | 52.02%, 45 seats | 37.30, 15 seats | 9.84%, 0 seats |
| Seats won | 47 | 13 | 0 |
| Seat change | ▲3 | ▼2 | Steady |
| Popular vote | 57,067 | 35,059 | 9,362 |
| Percentage | 55.02% | 33.80% | 9.03% |
| Swing | ▲3.00 | ▼3.50 | ▼0.81 |
Council control before election
Conservative
Subsequent council control
Conservative

The 1998 Westminster Council election took place on 7 May 1998 to elect members of Westminster City Council in London, England. The whole council was up for election and the Conservative party stayed in overall control of the council.

== Background ==
In the years after the 1994 local elections there were a total of 3 by-elections to replace councillors who resigned from their seats, however none of these elections resulted in seats changing party. In addition to these by-elections there was also a seat that became vacant without enough time to hold another by-election, leaving the council composition just before the election as follows:

↓
| 15 | 44 | 1 |
| Labour | Conservative | Vacant |

== Election result ==
1998 Westminster City Council local elections
| Party | Seats | Gains | Losses | Net gain/loss | Seats % | Votes % | Votes | +/− |
|---|---|---|---|---|---|---|---|---|
| Conservative | 47 | 2 | 0 | ▲2 | 78.33 | 55.02 | 57,067 | ▲3.00 |
| Labour | 13 | 0 | 0 | Steady | 21.67 | 33.80 | 35,059 | ▼3.50 |
| Liberal Democrats | 0 | 0 | 0 | Steady | 0.00 | 9.03 | 9,362 | ▼0.81 |
| Residents | 0 | 0 | 0 | Steady | 0.00 | 1.12 | 1,165 | New |
| Independent | 0 | 0 | 0 | Steady | 0.00 | 0.62 | 638 | New |
| Green | 0 | 0 | 0 | Steady | 0.00 | 0.30 | 313 | New |
| Liberal | 0 | 0 | 0 | Steady | 0.00 | 0.11 | 117 | New |
| Total | 60 | | | | | | 103,721 | |

After the election the composition of the council was as follows:

↓
| 13 | 47 |
| Labour | Conservative |

== Ward results ==
(*) - Indicates an incumbent candidate

(†) - Indicates an incumbent candidate standing in a different ward

=== Baker Street ===
Baker Street (2)
| Party | Candidate | Votes | % | ±% |
|---|---|---|---|---|
| Conservative | Angela Hooper* | 581 | 67.93 | ▲2.30 |
| Conservative | Ian Wilder* | 563 | | |
| Labour | Derek Buckland | 182 | 19.42 | ▼0.83 |
| Labour | Theresa Nnaji | 145 | | |
| Liberal Democrats | Rosalind Oakley | 117 | 12.65 | ▼0.14 |
| Liberal Democrats | Sara Coakley | 96 | | |
| Registered electors | | 3,430 | | ▲514 |
| Turnout | | 868 | 25.31 | ▼15.67 |
| Rejected ballots | | 5 | 0.58 | ▲0.41 |
| Conservative hold | | | | |
| Conservative hold | | | | |

=== Bayswater ===
Bayswater (3)
| Party | Candidate | Votes | % | ±% |
|---|---|---|---|---|
| Conservative | Anne Barns* | 1,142 | 49.57 | ▼0.78 |
| Conservative | Michael Brahams* | 1,060 | | |
| Conservative | Frixos Tombolis | 1,011 | | |
| Labour | Michael Katz | 782 | 35.46 | ▼7.61 |
| Labour | Generoso Alcantara | 768 | | |
| Labour | Charles Payne | 748 | | |
| Liberal Democrats | Susan Barring | 235 | 8.72 | ▲2.14 |
| Liberal Democrats | Jennifer Coleman | 168 | | |
| Liberal Democrats | Doreen Kearney | 162 | | |
| Green | Angela Georgievski | 135 | 6.25 | New |
| Registered electors | | 6,559 | | |
| Turnout | | 2,194 | 33.45 | ▼19.91 |
| Rejected ballots | | 8 | 0.04 | ▼0.06 |
| Conservative hold | | | | |
| Conservative hold | | | | |
| Conservative hold | | | | |

=== Belgrave ===
Belgrave (2)
| Party | Candidate | Votes | % | ±% |
|---|---|---|---|---|
| Conservative | Elizabeth Blois* | 941 | 77.73 | ▲1.57 |
| Conservative | Catherine Longworth* | 919 | | |
| Labour | Peter Cavalla | 163 | 13.50 | ▲0.11 |
| Labour | Angela Forrester | 160 | | |
| Liberal Democrats | Raymond Roberts | 119 | 8.78 | ▼1.67 |
| Liberal Democrats | Angela Whitelegge | 91 | | |
| Registered electors | | 4,050 | | ▲665 |
| Turnout | | 1,254 | 30.96 | ▼11.31 |
| Rejected ballots | | 6 | 0.48 | ▼0.01 |
| Conservative hold | | | | |
| Conservative hold | | | | |

=== Bryanston ===
Bryanston (2)
| Party | Candidate | Votes | % | ±% |
|---|---|---|---|---|
| Conservative | Jennifer Bianco* | 700 | 68.31 | ▼3.34 |
| Conservative | John Bull* | 673 | | |
| Labour | Pamela Hurtt | 215 | 20.00 | ▼8.35 |
| Labour | Tony Rea | 187 | | |
| Liberal Democrats | Colin Bell | 126 | 11.69 | New |
| Liberal Democrats | Nikhil Seth | 109 | | |
| Registered electors | | 3,403 | | ▲710 |
| Turnout | | 1,015 | 29.83 | ▼13.02 |
| Rejected ballots | | 7 | 0.69 | ▲0.26 |
| Conservative hold | | | | |
| Conservative hold | | | | |

=== Cavendish ===
Cavendish (3)
| Party | Candidate | Votes | % | ±% |
|---|---|---|---|---|
| Conservative | Andrew Allum | 1,294 | 65.60 | ▲8.61 |
| Conservative | Harvey Marshall* | 1,285 | | |
| Conservative | Mark Page | 1,203 | | |
| Labour | Brenda Buxton | 539 | 26.33 | ▼7.18 |
| Labour | William Beckett | 533 | | |
| Labour | Francis Prideaux | 446 | | |
| Liberal Democrats | Nichole Hole | 170 | 8.07 | ▼1.43 |
| Liberal Democrats | Michael Pepperrell | 169 | | |
| Liberal Democrats | Colin Wing | 126 | | |
| Registered electors | | 6,160 | | ▲1,089 |
| Turnout | | 2,049 | 33.26 | ▼15.84 |
| Rejected ballots | | 24 | 1.25 | ▲1.05 |
| Conservative hold | | | | |
| Conservative hold | | | | |
| Conservative hold | | | | |

=== Church Street ===
Church Street (3)
| Party | Candidate | Votes | % | ±% |
|---|---|---|---|---|
| Labour | Barbara Grahame* | 990 | 60.77 | ▲7.56 |
| Labour | Ron Harley* | 968 | | |
| Labour | Murad Qureshi | 896 | | |
| Conservative | Jonathan O'Brien | 464 | 28.39 | ▼6.06 |
| Conservative | William Diffey | 444 | | |
| Conservative | Julian Smith | 425 | | |
| Liberal Democrats | Robert Bell | 178 | 10.84 | ▲1.10 |
| Liberal Democrats | Jose Veiga | 174 | | |
| Liberal Democrats | Martin Thompson | 157 | | |
| Registered electors | | 6,826 | | ▲617 |
| Turnout | | 1,719 | 25.18 | ▼19.95 |
| Rejected ballots | | 19 | 1.10 | ▲0.85 |
| Labour hold | | | | |
| Labour hold | | | | |
| Labour hold | | | | |

=== Churchill ===
Churchill (3)
| Party | Candidate | Votes | % | ±% |
|---|---|---|---|---|
| Conservative | Carol Bailey* | 1,760 | 58.86 | ▲7.98 |
| Conservative | Garry Walsh | 1,672 | | |
| Conservative | John Cronin | 1,652 | | |
| Labour | Margaret Cavalla | 953 | 32.15 | ▼6.80 |
| Labour | Josephine Abercrombie | 912 | | |
| Labour | David Boothroyd | 912 | | |
| Liberal Democrats | Anthony Brett-Jones | 200 | 6.41 | ▼3.76 |
| Liberal Democrats | Rhoda Torres | 178 | | |
| Liberal Democrats | Michael Holmans | 176 | | |
| Independent | Gordon Webster | 74 | 2.57 | New |
| Registered electors | | 6,659 | | ▲233 |
| Turnout | | 3,017 | 45.31 | ▼17.22 |
| Rejected ballots | | 21 | 0.70 | ▲0.53 |
| Conservative hold | | | | |
| Conservative hold | | | | |
| Conservative hold | | | | |

=== Hamilton Terrace ===
Hamilton Terrace (2)
| Party | Candidate | Votes | % | ±% |
|---|---|---|---|---|
| Conservative | Judith Warner* | 754 | 67.92 | ▲1.63 |
| Conservative | Roderick Nye | 726 | | |
| Labour | Margaret Barton | 211 | 19.27 | ▲4.84 |
| Labour | Margherita Rendel | 209 | | |
| Liberal Democrats | Frances Franklin | 147 | 12.80 | ▲0.43 |
| Liberal Democrats | Gertrude Haywood | 132 | | |
| Registered electors | | 3,881 | | ▲277 |
| Turnout | | 1,187 | 30.58 | ▼14.62 |
| Rejected ballots | | 7 | 0.59 | ▲0.53 |
| Conservative hold | | | | |
| Conservative hold | | | | |

=== Harrow Road ===
Harrow Road (3)
| Party | Candidate | Votes | % | ±% |
|---|---|---|---|---|
| Labour | Alan Lazarus* | 1,189 | 65.79 | ▲1.36 |
| Labour | Jillian Selbourne* | 1,162 | | |
| Labour | Gary Martin | 1,115 | | |
| Conservative | Patrick O'Sullivan | 435 | 22.85 | ▼3.60 |
| Conservative | Daniel Astaire | 411 | | |
| Conservative | Timothy Slotover | 358 | | |
| Liberal Democrats | Donald McLachlan | 225 | 11.35 | ▲2.24 |
| Liberal Democrats | John Brown | 193 | | |
| Liberal Democrats | Kathleen Hobbins | 180 | | |
| Registered electors | | 7,402 | | ▲1,027 |
| Turnout | | 1,913 | 25.84 | ▼16.25 |
| Rejected ballots | | 25 | 1.31 | ▲1.12 |
| Labour hold | | | | |
| Labour hold | | | | |
| Labour hold | | | | |

=== Hyde Park ===
Hyde Park (3)
| Party | Candidate | Votes | % | ±% |
|---|---|---|---|---|
| Conservative | Pamela Batty* | 971 | 68.24 | ▼3.19 |
| Conservative | Anne Mallinson* | 940 | | |
| Conservative | Edmund Lazarus* | 910 | | |
| Labour | Angela Graham | 224 | 15.21 | ▼1.92 |
| Labour | Louis Al-Dhahir | 207 | | |
| Labour | Joseph Ogden | 198 | | |
| Liberal Democrats | Zoe Goldstein | 151 | 9.51 | ▼1.93 |
| Liberal Democrats | Giles Crown | 134 | | |
| Liberal Democrats | Derek Marshall | 108 | | |
| Green | Marlene Hayter | 97 | 7.04 | New |
| Registered electors | | 5,357 | | ▲824 |
| Turnout | | 1,388 | 25.91 | ▼12.23 |
| Rejected ballots | | 4 | 0.29 | ▲0.23 |
| Conservative hold | | | | |
| Conservative hold | | | | |
| Conservative hold | | | | |

=== Knightsbridge ===
Knightsbridge (2)
| Party | Candidate | Votes | % | ±% |
|---|---|---|---|---|
| Conservative | John Cox | 725 | 72.59 | ▲3.55 |
| Conservative | Gillian Rees-Mogg | 721 | | |
| Labour | Sarah Beal | 154 | 13.65 | ▲2.32 |
| Liberal Democrats | Tania Chislett | 148 | 13.76 | ▼5.97 |
| Liberal Democrats | Elizabeth Mackeith | 126 | | |
| Labour | Alen Mathewson | 118 | | |
| Registered electors | | 3,811 | | ▲573 |
| Turnout | | 1,047 | 27.47 | ▼5.35 |
| Rejected ballots | | 13 | 1.24 | ▲1.05 |
| Conservative hold | | | | |
| Conservative hold | | | | |

=== Lancaster Gate ===
Lancaster Gate (3)
| Party | Candidate | Votes | % | ±% |
|---|---|---|---|---|
| Conservative | Richard Tallboys | 956 | 66.97 | ▲4.78 |
| Conservative | Robert Davis* | 949 | | |
| Conservative | Simon Milton* | 925 | | |
| Labour | Patricia Parsons | 331 | 22.43 | ▼3.66 |
| Labour | Spencer Livermore | 315 | | |
| Labour | Andrew Somerville | 302 | | |
| Liberal Democrats | Sheila Kaye | 178 | 10.60 | ▼1.12 |
| Liberal Democrats | Johannes AVenmans | 138 | | |
| Liberal Democrats | John Abrams | 132 | | |
| Registered electors | | 5,607 | | ▲805 |
| Turnout | | 1,469 | 26.20 | ▼11.89 |
| Rejected ballots | | 13 | 0.88 | ▲0.55 |
| Conservative hold | | | | |
| Conservative hold | | | | |
| Conservative hold | | | | |

=== Little Venice ===
Little Venice (3)
| Party | Candidate | Votes | % | ±% |
|---|---|---|---|---|
| Conservative | Melvyn Caplan* | 1,352 | 61.32 | ▲7.41 |
| Conservative | Barbara Schmeling | 1,318 | | |
| Conservative | Jonathan Lord* | 1,317 | | |
| Labour | Joseph Hegarty | 689 | 30.54 | ▼7.91 |
| Labour | Guthrie McKie | 655 | | |
| Labour | David Obaze | 642 | | |
| Liberal Democrats | Ruth Simms | 199 | 8.14 | ▲0.50 |
| Liberal Democrats | David Brewin | 166 | | |
| Liberal Democrats | Philip Wardle | 164 | | |
| Registered electors | | 6,098 | | ▲794 |
| Turnout | | 2,293 | 37.60 | ▼17.91 |
| Rejected ballots | | 19 | 0.83 | ▲0.45 |
| Conservative hold | | | | |
| Conservative hold | | | | |
| Conservative hold | | | | |

=== Lord's ===
Lord's (2)
| Party | Candidate | Votes | % | ±% |
|---|---|---|---|---|
| Conservative | Cyril Nemeth* | 853 | 67.87 | ▼2.51 |
| Conservative | Kevin Gardner* | 839 | | |
| Labour | Katharine Hoskyns | 276 | 21.10 | ▲0.55 |
| Labour | Phillida Inman | 250 | | |
| Liberal Democrats | Richard de Ste Croix | 157 | 11.03 | ▲2.24 |
| Liberal Democrats | Herbert Hartwell | 118 | | |
| Registered electors | | 4,241 | | ▲311 |
| Turnout | | 1,304 | 30.75 | ▼9.84 |
| Rejected ballots | | 8 | 0.61 | ▲0.30 |
| Conservative hold | | | | |
| Conservative hold | | | | |

=== Maida Vale ===
Maida Vale (2)
| Party | Candidate | Votes | % | ±% |
|---|---|---|---|---|
| Conservative | Susie Burbridge | 1,430 | 56.92 | ▲8.05 |
| Conservative | Janet Prendergast* | 1,409 | | |
| Conservative | Ronald Raymond-Cox* | 1,401 | | |
| Labour | Vinod d'Cruz | 951 | 36.02 | ▼8.51 |
| Labour | Antony Mothersdale | 868 | | |
| Labour | David Worton | 864 | | |
| Liberal Democrats | Anne Couchman | 203 | 7.06 | ▲0.46 |
| Liberal Democrats | Martin Horwood | 183 | | |
| Liberal Democrats | Zena Lutrin | 140 | | |
| Registered electors | | 6,724 | | ▲667 |
| Turnout | | 2,611 | 38.83 | ▼14.58 |
| Rejected ballots | | 19 | 0.73 | ▲0.70 |
| Conservative hold | | | | |
| Conservative hold | | | | |
| Conservative hold | | | | |

=== Millbank ===
Millbank (3)
| Party | Candidate | Votes | % | ±% |
|---|---|---|---|---|
| Conservative | Duncan Sandys | 1,144 | 47.53 | ▲7.95 |
| Conservative | Justin Powell-Tuck | 1,123 | | |
| Labour | Peter Wright* | 1,119 | 45.72 | ▼4.22 |
| Labour | Mair Garside* (Note: Garside replaced Cllr Peter Bradley after his resignation in 1996) | 1,112 | | |
| Conservative | Alastair Moss | 996 | | |
| Labour | Simon Winters* | 996 | | |
| Liberal Democrats | Margaret Lang | 185 | 6.74 | ▼1.74 |
| Liberal Democrats | Timothy Green | 165 | | |
| Liberal Democrats | Robin Metzner | 126 | | |
| Registered electors | | 5,809 | | ▲212 |
| Turnout | | 2,579 | 44.40 | ▼9.00 |
| Rejected ballots | | 21 | 0.81 | ▲0.61 |
| Conservative gain from Labour | | | | |
| Conservative gain from Labour | | | | |
| Labour hold | | | | |

=== Queen's Park ===
Queen's Park (3)
| Party | Candidate | Votes | % | ±% |
|---|---|---|---|---|
| Labour | Barrie Taylor* | 914 | 51.81 | ▲7.56 |
| Labour | Paul Dimoldberg* (Note: Dimoldberg replaced Cllr Karen Buck after her resignation in 1997) | 846 | | |
| Labour | Mushtaq Qureshi* | 841 | | |
| Residents | Mary Nicholas | 443 | 23.21 | New |
| Residents | Mary German | 383 | | |
| Residents | Emmanuel Anfu | 339 | | |
| Conservative | Richard Phibbs | 289 | 16.30 | ▲13.97 |
| Conservative | Andrew Reid | 272 | | |
| Conservative | Richard Tray | 257 | | |
| Green | Peter Budge | 81 | 4.84 | New |
| Liberal Democrats | Peter Crystal | 81 | 3.84 | ▼1.85 |
| Liberal Democrats | David Hall-Matthews | 56 | | |
| Liberal Democrats | Anthony Williams | 56 | | |
| Registered electors | | 6,276 | | ▲765 |
| Turnout | | 1,755 | 27.96 | ▼16.79 |
| Rejected ballots | | 27 | 1.54 | ▲1.03 |
| Labour hold | | | | |
| Labour hold | | | | |
| Labour hold | | | | |

=== Regent's Park ===
Regent's Park (3)
| Party | Candidate | Votes | % | ±% |
|---|---|---|---|---|
| Conservative | Jonathan Djanogly* | 1,381 | 67.92 | ▼0.20 |
| Conservative | Timothy Joiner^{†} (Note: Joiner was a sitting councillor representing the Bayswater ward) | 1,357 | | |
| Conservative | Louise Howe | 1,350 | | |
| Labour | Linda Hardman | 481 | 22.81 | ▲1.46 |
| Labour | John Edwards | 455 | | |
| Labour | Richard Nicholls | 437 | | |
| Liberal Democrats | Patricia McCarthy | 220 | 9.27 | ▲0.31 |
| Liberal Democrats | Ian Sutherland | 181 | | |
| Liberal Democrats | Alan Thompson | 157 | | |
| Registered electors | | 6,114 | | ▲123 |
| Turnout | | 2,089 | 34.17 | ▼8.26 |
| Rejected ballots | | 12 | 0.57 | ▲0.45 |
| Conservative hold | | | | |
| Conservative hold | | | | |
| Conservative hold | | | | |

=== St George's ===
St George's (3)
| Party | Candidate | Votes | % | ±% |
|---|---|---|---|---|
| Conservative | Alan Bradley* | 1,808 | 69.61 | ▲4.35 |
| Conservative | Christopher Malthouse | 1,732 | | |
| Conservative | Benjamin Segal* | 1,728 | | |
| Labour | Isobel Bowler | 541 | 20.24 | ▼0.36 |
| Labour | David Blackall | 500 | | |
| Labour | Manuela Sykes | 491 | | |
| Liberal Democrats | Janice Taverne | 271 | 10.15 | ▼2.52 |
| Liberal Democrats | Miranda Green | 264 | | |
| Liberal Democrats | Gwenda Wood | 233 | | |
| Registered electors | | 7,878 | | ▲1,170 |
| Turnout | | 2,620 | 33.26 | ▼13.16 |
| Rejected ballots | | 14 | 0.53 | ▲0.14 |
| Conservative hold | | | | |
| Conservative hold | | | | |
| Conservative hold | | | | |

=== St James's ===
St James's (2)
| Party | Candidate | Votes | % | ±% |
|---|---|---|---|---|
| Conservative | Louise Hyams | 742 | 64.83 | ▲7.32 |
| Conservative | Alexander Nicoll* | 714 | | |
| Labour | David Propert | 405 | 35.17 | ▲1.86 |
| Labour | James Sheward | 385 | | |
| Registered electors | | 3,547 | | ▲287 |
| Turnout | | 1,189 | 33.52 | ▼11.82 |
| Rejected ballots | | 18 | 1.51 | ▲1.31 |
| Conservative hold | | | | |
| Conservative hold | | | | |

=== Victoria ===
Victoria (2)
| Party | Candidate | Votes | % | ±% |
|---|---|---|---|---|
| Conservative | David Harvey* | 934 | 64.31 | ▲0.11 |
| Conservative | Timothy Mitchell | 900 | | |
| Labour | Ingrid Gibson | 355 | 24.79 | ▲1.98 |
| Labour | Steven Burgess | 352 | | |
| Liberal Democrats | Josephine Hayes | 167 | 10.90 | ▼1.10 |
| Liberal Democrats | Simon Turner | 144 | | |
| Registered electors | | 4,236 | | ▲787 |
| Turnout | | 1,471 | 34.73 | ▼14.15 |
| Rejected ballots | | 9 | 0.61 | ▲0.49 |
| Conservative hold | | | | |
| Conservative hold | | | | |

=== Westbourne ===
Westbourne (3)
| Party | Candidate | Votes | % | ±% |
|---|---|---|---|---|
| Labour | Andrew Whitley* (Note: Whitley replaced Cllr Andrew Dismore after his resignation in 1997) | 1,041 | 55.17 | ▼1.88 |
| Labour | Nicola Russell | 974 | | |
| Labour | Katherine Thorne | 952 | | |
| Conservative | Clive Collins | 529 | 26.74 | ▼4.64 |
| Conservative | Michael Bullen | 506 | | |
| Conservative | Iheoma Oteh | 403 | | |
| Liberal Democrats | Morag Beattie | 249 | 11.57 | Steady |
| Liberal Democrats | Vera Williams | 198 | | |
| Liberal Democrats | Alison Dash | 175 | | |
| Liberal | Jonathan Frame | 117 | 6.53 | New |
| Registered electors | | 7,396 | | ▲868 |
| Turnout | | 1,879 | 25.41 | ▼16.81 |
| Rejected ballots | | 27 | 1.44 | ▲1.11 |
| Labour hold | | | | |
| Labour hold | | | | |
| Labour hold | | | | |

=== West End ===
West End (2)
| Party | Candidate | Votes | % | ±% |
|---|---|---|---|---|
| Conservative | Nicholas Boles | 739 | 40.74 | ▼19.06 |
| Conservative | Richard Stirling-Gibb | 582 | | |
| Independent | Peter Martindale | 564 | 34.78 | New |
| Labour | David Beida | 273 | 13.35 | ▼3.57 |
| Liberal Democrats | Richard O'Brien | 208 | 11.13 | ▼12.15 |
| Labour | Wing Ho | 160 | | |
| Liberal Democrats | Bernard Silver | 153 | | |
| Registered electors | | 4,816 | | ▲728 |
| Turnout | | 1,488 | 30.90 | ▼6.60 |
| Rejected ballots | | 4 | 0.27 | ▲0.20 |
| Conservative hold | | | | |
| Conservative hold | | | | |
