= Nickie Aiken =

British Conservative politician

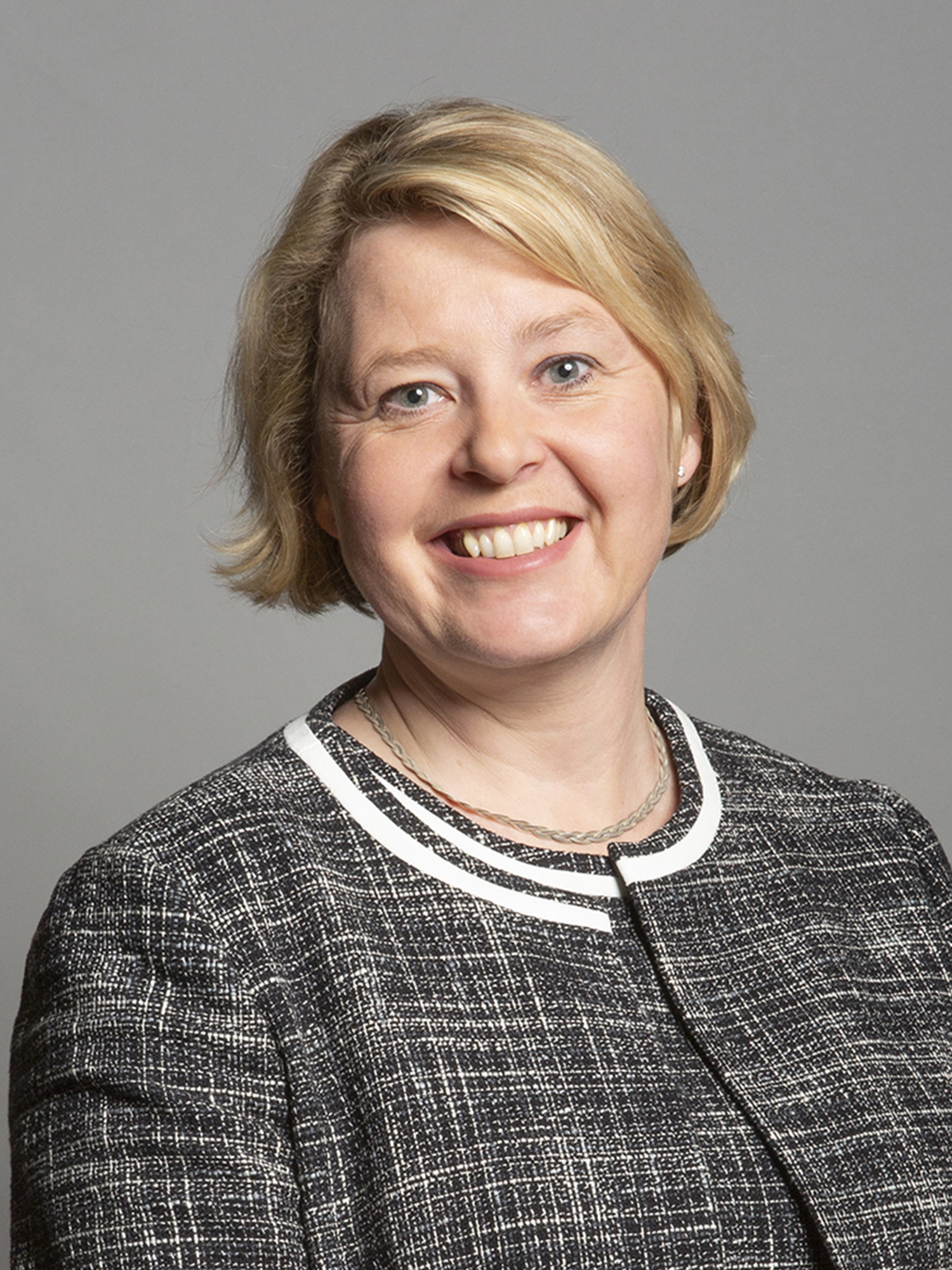
- Official portrait, 2019

Deputy Chairman of the Conservative Party Board
- In office 23 September 2023 – 30 May 2024

Member of Parliament for Cities of London and Westminster
- In office 12 December 2019 – 30 May 2024
- Preceded by: Mark Field
- Succeeded by: Rachel Blake

Leader of Westminster City Council
- In office 25 January 2017 – 22 January 2020
- Preceded by: Philippa Roe, Baroness Couttie
- Succeeded by: Rachael Robathan

Personal details
- Born: Nicola Jane Durbin; 4 February 1969 (age 57) Cardiff, Wales
- Party: Conservative
- Spouse: Alex Aiken (m. 2000)
- Children: 2
- Education: University of Exeter
- Website: nickieaiken.org.uk

Nicola Jane Aiken (née Durbin; born 4 February 1969) is a British Conservative Party politician who served as the Member of Parliament (MP) for Cities of London and Westminster from 2019 to 2024. She was the leader of Westminster City Council from 2017 to 2020.

In February 2024, Aiken announced that she would not seek re-election at the 2024 general election.

== Early life ==
Born in Cardiff, Wales, Aiken is the daughter of John and Pamela Durbin. Aiken was educated at Radyr Comprehensive School, and the University of Exeter, from where she graduated with a BA in Sociology in 1991.

== Career ==
Aiken first moved to London in 1997, and from 2001 to 2009 was head of public relations at Bradford & Bingley plc.

In 2006, she was elected as a Conservative councillor for Westminster City Council, representing Warwick ward, a safe seat covering an area in Pimlico. She remained a councillor until she stood down at the 2022 election. Aiken held various positions on the Council, including being the Cabinet Member for Children's Services and Public Protection & Licensing, as well as being the leader of the Council from January 2017 to January 2020. In 2018, she blocked the pedestrianization of Oxford Street.

From 2015 to 2018, Aiken was a board member of the Children and Family Court Advisory and Support Service. She was also a trustee of the board of The Royal Parks (2017–20).

Aiken voted to remain in the European Union in the 2016 referendum. She later supported Prime Minister Boris Johnson's Brexit withdrawal deal in Parliament, and voted in favour of the Internal Market Bill in 2020.

=== Member of Parliament ===
She was selected as the Conservative Party's candidate for the Central London seat of Cities of London and Westminster to fight the 2019 general election. In early December 2019, Aiken left Twitter, calling it "toxic". She has since returned to Twitter.

Aiken was elected at that election with 39.9% of the vote and a majority of 3,953.

In Parliament, she was a member of the Women and Equalities Committee until September 2020. She was appointed vice chairman of the Conservative Party in October 2020, with responsibility for women. Aiken also sits on the UK Delegation for the Council of Europe and is a Member of the House of Commons Commission.

Aiken has pushed for legislation on child safety. She has urged the Tories to increase assistance for private renters. In June 2021, she joined the Monken Hadley Common Bill Unopposed Bill Committee.

Outside of politics, Aiken is a company director at Sprucespace Property Management. She has worked for the Public Relations and Communications Association in media relations and crisis communications.

== Personal life ==
Aiken has lived in Pimlico for over twenty years, and before that in the Barbican. She lists her recreations as walking, pilates and reading.

She married Alexander Stuart Aiken in 2000. Since 2013, he has been executive director of government communications at the Cabinet Office for the UK Government. He resigned from the role of a Government Communicator in February 2024 to work as a communications adviser for the UАЕ. From 2000 to 2012, he was director of communications and strategy for Westminster City Council, whilst his wife was a councillor there. Before that, he worked for the Conservative Party as head of its campaigns unit and its press office. The couple have a daughter and a son.

Parliament of the United Kingdom
Preceded by Mark Field	Member of Parliament for Cities of London and Westminster; 2019–2024	Succeeded by Rachel Blake
