= Simon Milton (politician) =

British politician (1961–2011)

Sir Simon Henry Milton
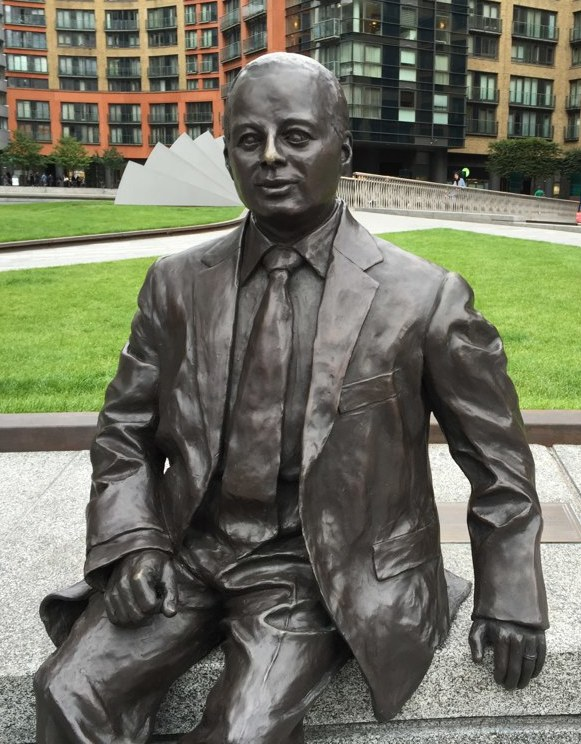
- Statue of Sir Simon Milton, Paddington Basin, London

Deputy Mayor of London for Policy and Planning
- In office 2008–2011
- Mayor: Boris Johnson
- Succeeded by: Edward Lister

Leader of Westminster City Council
- In office 2000–2008
- Preceded by: Melvyn Caplan
- Succeeded by: Colin Barrow

Councillor for Lancaster Gate Ward
- In office 1988 – 2008 (resigned)
- Preceded by: Peter Hartley (resigned; Con)
- Succeeded by: Andrew Smith (Con)

Personal details
- Born: 2 October 1961 London, England
- Died: 11 April 2011 (aged 49)
- Party: Conservative
- Domestic partner: Robert Davis (m. 2007)
- Education: Gonville and Caius College, Cambridge
- Profession: Public relations

Sir Simon Henry Milton (2 October 1961 – 11 April 2011) was a British Conservative politician. He lately served as London's Deputy Mayor for Policy and Planning, and before that was a leader of Westminster City Council and Chairman of the Local Government Association. Milton was a director of Ian Greer Associates, a parliamentary lobbying company "with close links to the Tory party" which was at the centre of the "cash-for-questions" scandal in the 1990s.

== Early life ==
Milton was the son of Clive and Ruth Milton and was raised in Cricklewood, London. His father was one of the Jewish children rescued by the Kindertransport mission and brought to Britain in 1939. Milton was educated at St Paul's School, London, and Gonville and Caius College, Cambridge, where he was Chairman of the Cambridge University Conservative Association and President of the Cambridge Union.

He started his working career in Sharaton's, his father's business, a chain of patisserie shops and bakers with about twenty shops in North London. The business was sold to Ponti's on his father's retirement.

He stood for Parliament unsuccessfully for the Conservative Party in Leicester East in the 1997 general election.

== Knighthood ==
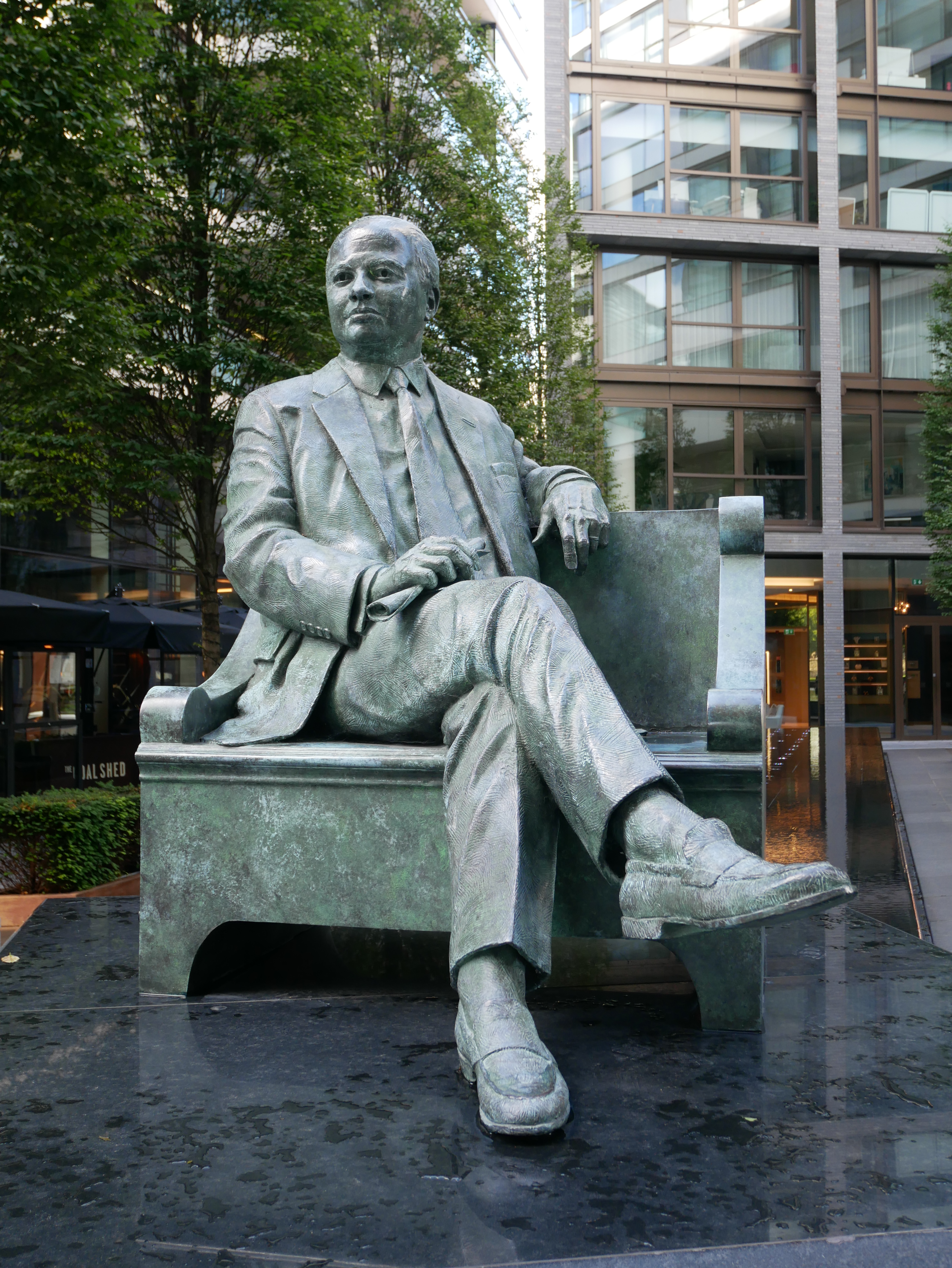
Statue of Milton near City Hall

Milton was named a Knight Bachelor in the 2006 New Year's honours list for services to local government.

== Mayor Boris Johnson's administration ==
With effect from 6 May 2008, Milton was appointed to the position of Senior Adviser, Planning, in the administration of London Mayor Boris Johnson. This led to his resignation as a councillor. From September 2008 he became a full-time politician as the administration's Deputy Mayor for Policy and Planning. In that role, he was responsible for overseeing policies for the built environment.

In June 2009, Milton was also appointed Chief of Staff to the Mayor, with responsibility for managing the Mayoral advisers, as well as the Greater London Authority budgets and administration.

== Personal life ==
Milton was diagnosed with leukaemia in 1990. In 1998 he underwent a bone-marrow transplant. As a result, his immune system was weakened, leading to a bout of pneumonia which seriously damaged his lungs. His health never fully recovered. He and his partner Robert Davis, fellow Westminster Councillor and former Lord Mayor of Westminster, were together for over 20 years and entered into a civil partnership in June 2007.

He was a member of the West London Synagogue.

Milton died on 11 April 2011, aged 49.

== The Sir Simon Milton Foundation ==
Christabel Flight, the wife of Howard Flight, and a protégée and fellow Councillor of Milton at the City of Westminster, proposed setting up a foundation in his name. It has brought together a number of prominent trustees, mainly from the Conservative Party, many with links to Westminster Council. These include Baroness Eaton and Tony Pidgley, with John Barradell, Town Clerk of London as the chair. The purpose of the charity is the promotion of Simon Milton's vision to help both young and older people in the City of Westminster, and elsewhere across London.

== Statues and plaques ==
There are five statues and plaques dedicated to Milton in public in Westminster.

== See also ==
- Homes for votes scandal
- Westminster cemeteries scandal

Political offices
Preceded by Lord (Sandy) Bruce-Lockhart	Chair of the Local Government Association; 2007–2008	Succeeded by Margaret Eaton
