= Glenys Roberts =

British journalist

Glenys Roberts is a British journalist known for her work at The Daily Mail, and as a Conservative Party (UK) councillor for Westminster City Council in London, representing the West End Ward. This covered the West End of London, particularly the areas of Mayfair, Fitzrovia and Soho. She introduced new controls over noise levels and inaugurated the Berwick Street Christmas lights ceremonies featuring Terry Gilliam and Joanna Lumley to draw attention to the challenges facing market traders. Roberts served as a councillor from 1999 to 2018.

In 2007, she won a libel case against her former employer, The Telegraph, after it claimed she had a vendetta against a restaurant near her home.
