= Robert Davis (British politician) =

British Conservative politician (born 1957)

Robert Davis MBE DL
- Born: Robert Jonathan Davis; 27 September 1957 (age 69)
- Education: Christ's College, Finchley; Gonville and Caius College, Cambridge
- Occupations: Lawyer and politician
- Political party: Conservative
- Partner: Sir Simon Milton (m. 2007; died 2011)

Robert Jonathan Davis MBE DL (born 27 September 1957) is a British lawyer and former Conservative Party politician. He was deputy leader of Westminster City Council, and chairman of its planning committee for 17 years. He served as Lord Mayor of Westminster from 1996 to 1997, and also chaired the London Mayors' Association between 1998 and 2016.

== Early life ==
Robert Davis was born on 27 September 1957. He is the son of Gerald Davis (died 2000) and Pamela Davis, née Lee (died 1997).

He was educated at Christ's College, Finchley, followed by Gonville and Caius College, Cambridge and Wolfson College, Cambridge, after which he trained as a solicitor at the College of Law in London's Lancaster Gate. He was admitted as a solicitor in October 1983. From 1985 to 2015, Davis was a partner (now a consultant) in solicitors' firm Freeman Box, Bentinck Street, Marylebone, London, specialising in property law.

== Political career ==
Davis was first elected to Westminster City Council in 1982 for the Bayswater ward, before representing neighbouring Lancaster Gate from 1986 onwards. From 1996 to 1997, he was the then youngest Lord Mayor of Westminster. During his year of office, he participated in a number of events with Nelson Mandela during his state visit to the UK in July 1996.

Between 2003 and 2018, Davis served on a rota basis as one of a number of Lord Mayor Locum Tenens (deputising for the Lord Mayor). He was deputy leader of the council from May 2008 until March 2018. In addition, he served as Cabinet Member for the Built Environment (with responsibility for planning, major infrastructure projects and special events) from 2002 to 2017, and chaired the council's principal Planning Committee for seventeen years, from 2000 to 2017.

Davis also served as Cabinet Member for Business, Culture and Heritage between January 2017 and March 2018. Prior to this, he created West End Live in 2005, which has become an annual theatrical event. It originally took place in Leicester Square, but is now staged in Trafalgar Square each June, comprising fully costumed extracts from all the current West End musicals. Davis produced the event and raised all the monies necessary until he retired as a Cabinet Member in 2018.

As Cabinet Member for large infrastructure projects, he initiated and led on the project to make Baker Street and Gloucester Place two way, the public realm improvements to Bond Street and Hanover Square, and the public realm project around the Aldwych. He also oversaw the £21m rejuvenation of Leicester Square, and the regeneration of Piccadilly and Marble Arch.

As chairman of the council's principal planning committee, he was instrumental in persuading the developers of a site in Victoria to include a theatre in their development – now known as The Other Palace – and in persuading Derwent London to build a new 650-seat theatre in Charing Cross Road (now under construction and due for completion in 2022, it is currently known as the "Nimax").

As Cabinet Member for Planning he introduced and led on the council's "Design Excellence" campaign to improve the quality of architecture in Westminster. He also conceived the idea of "the City of Sculpture" Festival which persuaded sculptors and galleries to place large art work and sculptures throughout the City of Westminster, including in Park Lane and at Marble Arch. In 2017, Davis had the idea of a temporary theatre at Marble Arch and co-produced the musical Five Guys Named Moe at the theatre with Underbelly. He was also responsible for the council's Green plaque scheme commemorating famous people and events, and their association with Westminster properties. Davis chaired the Westminster World Heritage Site Board between 2015 and 2018.

In July 2014, he was invited by the Secretary of State for Culture, Media and Sport to become a member of an advisory committee established by the Government to support the erection of a statue of Mahatma Gandhi in Trafalgar Square.

In March 2018, following criticism of "the large scale of gifts and hospitality" received by Davis from property developers, he resigned as Deputy Leader of the council and as a Cabinet Member to allow an internal independent inquiry to investigate the issues at his own request. He subsequently resigned from the Council in October 2018. At the time of his resignation, he was the borough's longest currently serving councillor, with a tenure lasting over 36 years. He was also the longest-serving Westminster councillor since the borough's formation in 1965.

=== Allegations ===
On 7 March 2018, Davis stood down as deputy leader and as a cabinet member after The Guardian reported into him having received hospitality and gifts over 500 times between 2012 and 2017, much of it from property developers, during the period when he was Chairman of the Planning Committee. Davis enjoyed hospitality from leading property developers, including Gerald Ronson, Sir Stuart Lipton, Brian Bickell and Sir George Iacobescu. Council rules require that any gifts or hospitality valued at £25 or more must be declared, and Davis's register included trips to Switzerland, France, the US, and Scotland's Gleneagles Hotel and golf resort.

At Davis's request, Westminster's legal director investigated whether Davis had breached the council's code of conduct. The investigation was assisted by independent barrister James Goudie QC. It reported in October 2018, with Sir Stephen Lamport, who was independently overseeing the investigation, finding that Davis had "breached the code of conduct" whilst a councillor, and that his "acceptance of gifts and hospitality from developers before or after a planning decision may ... have placed him in a position in which people might seek to influence him in the performance of his duties." Lamport stated that there was no evidence of any inappropriate conduct or illegality, but the scale of the hospitality received by Davis was "extraordinary".

Davis's official declarations revealed that he was the recipient of tickets to West End shows and invitations to what were described by The Guardian as "exclusive dinners in London's finest restaurants", as well as trips to the south of France. On one day in Mallorca, he managed two lunch meetings: the first at the home of theatrical impresario and Conservative peer Andrew Lloyd Webber, and the second at the home of the Earl of Chichester. The number of times Davis received hospitality or gifts was in fact 893 – higher than had earlier been reported by the same newspaper.

From the beginning of 2015, he was entertained by and received gifts from figures in the property industry over 150 times, which made such occurrences nearly weekly. The Guardian found that Davis received gifts or hospitality from property companies who were involved in half of the planning applications which his committee ruled on in 2016. According to Lamport, the high level of gifts and hospitality accepted by Davis "lay open his reputation, and therefore that of the Council, to a perception – fairly or unfairly – that called into question his personal responsibility to promote high standards of conduct".

In his resignation statement, Davis said: "An inquiry has been completed by the council. They have confirmed that none of the declarations I made or hospitality I received influenced decisions I took as a councillor and that nothing I did was unlawful. However, they have concluded my actions nevertheless created a perception that was negative to the council. While I dispute this, I wish to draw a line under the matter. It is now time for me to move on to the next stage in my life and for the next generation of councillors to lead Westminster."

== Other interests ==
Between 1997 and 2016, Davis chaired the London Mayors' Association, an organisation comprising the current and former mayors of the 33 London Boroughs, which was originally founded in 1901. Davis turned the then moribund LMA into a successful and widely recognised group. He was a director and trustee of the Open Air Theatre in Regent's Park from 1986 to 2019, and chairman of the Board between 2009 and 2019, during which time the venue won several theatrical awards, including Oliviers.

Together with his fellow councillor Lady Flight, and other colleagues, he founded the Sir Simon Milton Foundation, a registered charity which was established after the death of Davis's partner Sir Simon Milton (lately Leader of Westminster Council, Chairman of the Local Government Association and Deputy Mayor of London and Chief of Staff to Boris Johnson as Mayor of London until Milton's death in 2011). The purpose of the charity was to continue to support Milton's priorities to address loneliness and isolation among older persons, and to support young people into work through supporting their educational needs. The Foundation now runs Silver Sunday, a day held every October to support older people in meeting others by attending one of over 1,200 events throughout the country. The Foundation has also sponsored the establishment of the Sir Simon Milton Westminster University Technical College in Pimlico, and has distributed a number of bursaries and grants to students in financial need, including at Davis and Milton's own Cambridge College, Gonvile & Caius. Davis is currently Deputy Chairman of the Foundation.

Davis is a trustee of the Savoy Educational Trust, a charity established by the Directors of the Savoy Hotel, which provides financial assistance to hospitality colleges and schools. He is also a trustee of Mousetrap Theatre Projects, a charity that helps young people, including those with disabilities, to attend West End theatre shows at a low cost. In 2007, Davis helped establish the Westminster Guide Lecturers' Association, which awards authorised green badges to tour guides expert in the history of the City of Westminster who have passed an exam. Davis was its first Honorary President between 2007 and 2017. He has been the International Goodwill Ambassador of the London New Year's Day Parade since 1998, and between 2003 and 2018 organised the Westminster Council entry in the Parade, winning the Best Borough Entry seven times. He also served on the Board of the New West End Company (the Business Improvement District for Oxford Street, Regent's Street and Bond Street) between 2000 and 2011, and again between 2017 and 2018.

== Honours and awards ==
Davis is a Deputy Lieutenant for Greater London. In the 2015 Birthday Honours, he was appointed a Member of the Order of the British Empire (MBE) for services to planning and local government.

== Personal life ==
His long-term partner (until his death in 2011) was Sir Simon Milton, who had been leader of Westminster City Council and Deputy Mayor of London to Boris Johnson. In 2007, they entered into a civil partnership at London's Ritz Hotel.

In 2022, Davis published an autobiography, Unplanned - The Snakes and Ladders of a Life in the City of Westminster.

He lists his interests in Who's Who as "the theatre, collecting miniature mayors, learning Spanish".
