= 1994 Westminster City Council election =

1994 local election in England

- 5 May 1994

All 60 council seats of the Westminster City Council 31 seats needed for a majority
- Registered: 111,268
- Turnout: 51,291, 46.10%

	First party	Second party
Leader	Peter M. Young	Unknown
Party	Conservative	Labour
Leader since	29 July 1993	Unknown
Leader's seat	Victoria	Unknown
Last election	45 seats, 53.99%	15 seats, 37.99%
Seats before	45	14
Seats won	45	15
Seat change	Steady	▲1
Popular vote	66,201	47,475
Percentage	52.02%	37.30%
Swing	▼1.97	▼0.69
	Third party	Fourth party
Leader	Unknown	Unknown
Party	Liberal Democrats	Ind. Labour Party
Leader since	Unknown	Unknown
Leader's seat	Unknown	Unknown
Last election	0 seats, 5.53%	New
Seats before	0	1
Seats won	0	0
Seat change	Steady	▼1
Popular vote	12,528	734
Percentage	9.84%	0.58%
Swing	▲4.31	New
Council control before election
Conservative
Council control after election
Conservative

The 1994 Westminster Council election took place on 5 May 1994 to elect members of Westminster City Council in London, England. The whole council was up for election and the Conservative party stayed in overall control of the council.

== Election result ==
1994 Westminster City Council local election
Party	Seats	Gains	Losses	Net gain/loss	Seats %	Votes %	Votes	+/−
Conservative	45	0	0	Steady	75.00	52.02	66,201	▼1.97
Labour	15	1	0	▲1	25.00	37.30	47,475	▼0.69
Liberal Democrats	0	0	0	Steady	0.00	9.84	12,528	▲4.31
Ind. Labour Party	0	0	1	▼1	0.00	0.58	734	New
Natural Law	0	0	0	Steady	0.00	0.19	247	New
SDP	0	0	0	Steady	0.00	0.07	89	▼0.02
Total	60						127,274	

== Ward results ==
(*) - Indicates an incumbent candidate

(†) - Indicates an incumbent candidate who is standing in a different ward

=== Baker Street ===
Baker Street (2)
Party	Candidate	Votes	%	±%
Conservative	Ian Wilder	744	65.63	▼4.68
Conservative	Angela Hooper*	734		
Labour	Stephen Gruneberg	232	20.25	▼2.78
Labour	Pamela Hurtt	224		
Liberal Democrats	Richard O'Brien	151	12.79	▲6.13
Liberal Democrats	Arline Woutersz	137		
Natural Law	Heather Butensky	15	1.33	New
Registered electors		2,916		▲122
Turnout		1,195	40.98	▼4.26
Rejected ballots		2	0.17	▼0.15
Conservative hold				
Conservative hold				

=== Bayswater ===
Bayswater (3)
Party	Candidate	Votes	%	±%
Conservative	Anne Barns*	1,442	50.35	▲2.02
Conservative	Michael Brahams*	1,374		
Conservative	Timothy Joiner	1,335		
Labour	Robert Ashdown	1,228	43.07	▲7.40
Labour	Charles Payne	1,173		
Labour	Edward Firth	1,152		
Liberal Democrats	Caroline Reeves	232	6.58	▲0.04
Liberal Democrats	Bharat Janani	166		
Liberal Democrats	Susan Baring	144		
Registered electors		5,583		▲347
Turnout		2,979	53.36	▼6.23
Rejected ballots		3	0.10	▼0.19
Conservative hold				
Conservative hold				
Conservative hold				

=== Belgrave ===
Belgrave (2)
Party	Candidate	Votes	%	±%
Conservative	Elizabeth Blois*	993	76.16	▼7.85
Conservative	Catherine Longworth	974		
Labour	Peter Cavalla	175	13.39	▼0.26
Labour	Angela Forrester	170		
Liberal Democrats	Angela Whitelegge	138	10.45	▲8.11
Liberal Democrats	Simon Bryden-Brook	131		
Registered electors		3,395		▼209
Turnout		1,435	42.27	▼3.07
Rejected ballots		7	0.49	▲0.37
Conservative hold				
Conservative hold				

=== Bryanston ===
Bryanston (2)
Party	Candidate	Votes	%	±%
Conservative	Jennifer Bianco*	789	71.65	▼2.32
Conservative	John Bull*	772		
Labour	Derek Buckland	319	28.35	▲8.52
Labour	Brenda Buxton	299		
Registered electors		2,693		▼178
Turnout		1,154	42.85	▼3.75
Rejected ballots		5	0.43	▲0.06
Conservative hold				
Conservative hold				

=== Cavendish ===
Cavendish (3)
Party	Candidate	Votes	%	±%
Conservative	Harvey Marshall*	1,340	56.99	▲3.00
Conservative	James Hood	1,303		
Conservative	Nicholas Markham*	1,296		
Labour	Paul Dimoldenberg	818	33.51	▼1.32
Labour	Linda Hardman	791		
Labour	David Pitt-Watson	706		
Liberal Democrats	Michael Holmans	227	9.50	▲5.76
Liberal Democrats	Lesley Tunnadine	224		
Liberal Democrats	June Strick	205		
Registered electors		5,071		▼212
Turnout		2,490	49.10	▼2.48
Rejected ballots		5	0.20	▲0.09
Conservative hold				
Conservative hold				
Conservative hold				

=== Church Street ===
Church Street (3)
Party	Candidate	Votes	%	±%
Labour	Barbara Grahame	1,383	53.21	▼13.71
Labour	Richard Nicholls*	1,377		
Labour	Ron Harley	1,240		
Conservative	Luftur Choudhury	882	34.45	▲1.37
Conservative	Richard Bacon	863		
Conservative	Hifzur Rahman	843		
Liberal Democrats	Robert Bell	288	9.74	New
Liberal Democrats	Martin Thompson	223		
Liberal Democrats	Jose Da Silva	220		
Natural Law	Alaric Law	65	2.60	New
Registered electors		6,209		▲391
Turnout		2,802	45.13	▼3.51
Rejected ballots		7	0.25	▼0.14
Labour hold				
Labour hold				
Labour hold				

=== Churchill ===
Churchill (3)
Party	Candidate	Votes	%	±%
Conservative	Carol Bailey	1,977	50.88	▲9.63
Conservative	Gareth Kybett	1,848		
Conservative	Nicola Woodhead Page	1,790		
Labour	Margaret Cavalia	1,494	38.95	▲9.04
Labour	Judith Page	1,408		
Labour	Steve Barwick	1,396		
Liberal Democrats	Keith Dugmore	392	10.17	▼15.61
Liberal Democrats	Janice Taverne	375		
Liberal Democrats	Rhoda Torres	355		
Registered electors		6,426		▲85
Turnout		4,018	62.53	▼5.93
Rejected ballots		7	0.17	▼0.11
Conservative hold				
Conservative hold				
Conservative hold				

=== Hamilton Terrace ===
Hamilton Terrace (2)
Party	Candidate	Votes	%	±%
Conservative	Katherine Ivens*	1,013	66.29	▲4.81
Conservative	Judith Warner*	980		
Labour	Guy Howard	231	14.43	▲4.81
Liberal Democrats	Richard de Ste Croix	209	12.37	▼11.45
Labour	Trevor Sheppard	202		
Liberal Democrats	Caroline Shorten	163		
SDP	Joe Aveline	89	5.92	New
Natural Law	Jonathan Leslie	15	1.00	New
Registered electors		3,604		▲87
Turnout		1,629	45.20	▼11.92
Rejected ballots		1	0.06	▼0.04
Conservative hold				
Conservative hold				

=== Harrow Road ===
Harrow Road (3)
Party	Candidate	Votes	%	±%
Labour	Jacqueline Rosenberg* (Note: Rosenberg replaced Cllr. Joseph Glickman after his resignation in 1993)	1,577	64.43	▲4.42
Labour	Alan Lazarus*	1,511		
Labour	Jillian Selbourne*	1,471		
Conservative	Simon Lapthorne	638	26.45	▼5.47
Conservative	Douglas Jacobs	622		
Conservative	Anthony Frieze	612		
Liberal Democrats	John Laurie	249	9.11	New
Liberal Democrats	Donald McLachlan	211		
Liberal Democrats	Nigel Mukherjee	186		
Registered electors		6,375		▲422
Turnout		2,683	42.09	▼7.62
Rejected ballots		5	0.19	▼0.12
Labour hold				
Labour hold				
Labour hold				

=== Hyde Park ===
Hyde Park (3)
Party	Candidate	Votes	%	±%
Conservative	Pamela Batty*	1,125	71.43	▲3.14
Conservative	Edmund Lazarus* (Note: Lazarus replaced Cllr Shirley Porter after her resignation in 1993)	1,102		
Conservative	Anne Mallinson*	1,088		
Labour	Louis Al-Dhahir	272	17.13	▲0.30
Labour	Linda Julian	266		
Labour	Margaret Lynch	258		
Liberal Democrats	Zoe Goldstein	199	11.44	▲5.60
Liberal Democrats	Rodney Smith	174		
Liberal Democrats	Mark Smale-Adams	158		
Registered electors		4,533		▲291
Turnout		1,729	38.14	▼5.64
Rejected ballots		1	0.06	▼0.10
Conservative hold				
Conservative hold				
Conservative hold				

=== Knightsbridge ===
Knightsbridge (2)
Party	Candidate	Votes	%	±%
Conservative	Simon Macdonagh	666	68.94	▲7.52
Conservative	Robert Moreland*	647		
Liberal Democrats	Elizabeth Mackeith	199	19.73	▲17.00
Liberal Democrats	Marguerite Valverde	177		
Labour	Mair Garside	117	11.33	▲5.08
Labour	Ivy Searle	98		
Registered electors		3,238		▲262
Turnout		1,063	32.83	▼14.85
Rejected ballots		2	0.19	▲0.04
Conservative hold				
Conservative hold				

=== Lancaster Gate ===
Lancaster Gate (3)
Party	Candidate	Votes	%	±%
Conservative	Christopher Potts	1,055	62.19	▼2.07
Conservative	Robert Davis*	1,054		
Conservative	Simon Milton*	1,045		
Labour	Patricia Parsons	465	26.09	▲2.86
Labour	Avril Rippingdale	443		
Labour	Edwardo Taylor	415		
Liberal Democrats	Heather Widoger	205	11.72	New
Liberal Democrats	John Abrams	196		
Liberal Democrats	Ting-Kit Levy	194		
Registered electors		4,802		▲327
Turnout		1,829	38.09	▼4.26
Rejected ballots		6	0.33	▼0.01
Conservative hold				
Conservative hold				
Conservative hold				

=== Little Venice ===
Little Venice (3)
Party	Candidate	Votes	%	±%
Conservative	Julia Hunt*	1,461	53.91	▲0.17
Conservative	Melvyn Caplan*	1,453		
Conservative	Jonathan Lord	1,405		
Labour	Margaret Cahill	1,064	38.45	▼2.02
Labour	David Obaze	1,023		
Labour	Francis Prideaux	995		
Liberal Democrats	Martin Sale	215	7.64	▲1.85
Liberal Democrats	David Brewin	201		
Liberal Democrats	Philip Wardle	196		
Registered electors		5,304		▲6
Turnout		2,891	54.51	▼4.95
Rejected ballots		11	0.38	▲0.25
Conservative hold				
Conservative hold				
Conservative hold				

=== Lord's ===
Lord's (2)
Party	Candidate	Votes	%	±%
Conservative	Cyril Nemeth*	1,025	70.38	▼1.20
Conservative	Kevin Gardner*	1,009		
Labour	John Barry	315	20.55	▼0.98
Labour	John Bolt	279		
Liberal Democrats	Herbert Hartwell	139	8.79	New
Liberal Democrats	Anthony Franklin	115		
Natural Law	David Fawcett	4	0.28	New
Registered electors		3,930		▲50
Turnout		1,595	40.59	▼9.62
Rejected ballots		5	0.31	▲0.21
Conservative hold				
Conservative hold				

=== Maida Vale ===
Maida Vale (3)
Party	Candidate	Votes	%	±%
Conservative	Ronald Raymond-Cox*	1,462	48.87	▲0.19
Conservative	Janet Prendergast	1,460		
Conservative	Martin Jiggens*	1,433		
Labour	Neale Coleman	1,359	44.53	▼0.16
Labour	Jenifer McClelland	1,329		
Labour	Richard Tayler	1,280		
Liberal Democrats	Anne Couchman	222	6.60	▼0.03
Liberal Democrats	Thomas Billson	187		
Liberal Democrats	Lewis Wigoder	180		
Registered electors		6,057		▲681
Turnout		3,235	53.41	▼7.12
Rejected ballots		1	0.03	▼0.22
Conservative hold				
Conservative hold				
Conservative hold				

=== Millbank ===
Millbank (3)
Party	Candidate	Votes	%	±%
Labour	Peter Wright*	1,412	49.94	▼1.89
Labour	Peter Bradley*	1,383		
Labour	Simon Winters* (Note: Winters replaced Cllr Hugh Garside after his death in 1993)	1,325		
Conservative	Harry Haynes	1,137	39.58	▼3.26
Conservative	Graham Mitchell	1,067		
Conservative	Timothy Mitchell	1,060		
Liberal Democrats	Jessica Beattie	248	8.48	▲3.15
Liberal Democrats	Margaret Lang	247		
Liberal Democrats	Robin Metzner	205		
Natural Law	Joseph Sen	55	2.00	New
Registered electors		5,597		▲202
Turnout		2,989	53.40	▼3.69
Rejected ballots		6	0.20	▲0.04
Labour hold				
Labour hold				
Labour hold				

=== Queen's Park ===
Queen's Park (3)
Party	Candidate	Votes	%	±%
Labour	Karen Buck*	1,250	44.25	▼20.18
Labour	Barrie Taylor	1,047		
Labour	Mushtaq Qureshi	921		
Ind. Labour Party	Mary Nicholas*	734	30.27	New
Conservative	Sarah Livingstone	543	19.79	▼7.91
Conservative	Noel Connaughton	483		
Conservative	Richard Phibbs	413		
Liberal Democrats	Philip Barnard	162	5.69	▼2.18
Liberal Democrats	Norman Manington	133		
Liberal Democrats	Barnaby Rogerson	120		
Registered electors		5,511		▲14
Turnout		2,466	44.75	▼3.49
Rejected ballots		15	0.61	▲0.08
Labour hold				
Labour hold				
Labour gain from Ind. Labour Party				

=== Regent's Park ===
Regent's Park (3)
Party	Candidate	Votes	%	±%
Conservative	Roger Bramble*	1,617	68.12	▼0.17
Conservative	Richard Jones	1,609		
Conservative	Jonathan Djanogly	1,607		
Labour	Hilary Allen	518	21.35	▼1.12
Labour	Daniel Carlen	501		
Labour	Sidney Norden	496		
Liberal Democrats	Patricia McCarthy	244	8.96	▼0.28
Liberal Democrats	Bernard Silver	211		
Liberal Democrats	Alan Thompson	180		
Natural Law	Tony Davids	37	1.57	New
Registered electors		5,991		▲209
Turnout		2,542	42.43	▼6.91
Rejected ballots		3	0.12	▼0.20
Conservative hold				
Conservative hold				
Conservative hold				

=== St George's ===
St George's (3)
Party	Candidate	Votes	%	±%
Conservative	Alan Bradley*	1,889	65.26	▼8.05
Conservative	Benjamin Segal*	1,789		
Conservative	David Weeks*	1,775		
Labour	Ashley Bramall	611	20.60	▲0.95
Labour	Pamela Eyre	583		
Labour	Allan Wylie	529		
Liberal Democrats	Jane Smithard	384	12.67	▲5.63
Liberal Democrats	Gwenda Wood	355		
Liberal Democrats	Colin Wing	320		
Natural Law	John Small	41	1.47	New
Registered electors		6,708		▲441
Turnout		3,114	46.42	▼2.02
Rejected ballots		12	0.39	▲0.19
Conservative hold				
Conservative hold				
Conservative hold				

=== St James's ===
St James's (2)
Party	Candidate	Votes	%	±%
Conservative	Carolyn Keen*	816	57.51	▼0.49
Conservative	Alexander Nicoll	761		
Labour	Stephen Hilditch	463	33.31	▼3.85
Labour	Sara Kibel	450		
Liberal Democrats	Guy Halliwell	132	9.18	▲4.34
Liberal Democrats	Esther Stansfield	120		
Registered electors		3,260		▼84
Turnout		1,478	45.34	▼5.02
Rejected ballots		3	0.20	▲0.20
Conservative hold				
Conservative hold				

=== Victoria ===
Victoria (2)
Party	Candidate	Votes	%	±%
Conservative	David Harvey*	976	64.20	▼0.43
Conservative	Peter Young*	971		
Labour	Colin Baker	347	22.81	▼8.28
Labour	Martin Garside	345		
Liberal Democrats	Marie Garde	192	12.00	▲7.72
Liberal Democrats	John Thompson	172		
Natural Law	Richard Johnson	15	0.99	New
Registered electors		3,449		▼327
Turnout		1,686	48.88	▼1.33
Rejected ballots		2	0.12	▼0.04
Conservative hold				
Conservative hold				

=== Westbourne ===
Westbourne (3)
Party	Candidate	Votes	%	±%
Labour	Andrew Dismore*	1,473	57.05	▲0.98
Labour	Katherine Wilkins	1,410		
Labour	Ben Summerskill	1,378		
Conservative	Elizabeth Noel	806	31.38	▼2.01
Conservative	Michael Bosco-Rothery	789		
Conservative	Ian Priestner	749		
Liberal Democrats	Morag Beatie	329	11.57	▲1.03
Liberal Democrats	Vera Williams	275		
Liberal Democrats	Alan Goodridge	259		
Registered electors		6,528		▲454
Turnout		2,756	42.22	▼5.64
Rejected ballots		9	0.33	▲0.16
Labour hold				
Labour hold				
Labour hold				

=== West End ===
West End (2)
Party	Candidate	Votes	%	±%
Conservative	David Avery*	869	59.80	▲2.65
Conservative	Peter Martindale*	821		
Liberal Democrats	Richard Rawlinson	339	23.28	N/A
Liberal Democrats	Michael Durnigan	318		
Labour	Harold Brookstone	255	16.92	▲3.32
Labour	May Harley	223		
Registered electors		4,088		▼102
Turnout		1,533	37.50	▼5.39
Rejected ballots		1	0.07	▼0.04
Conservative hold				
Conservative hold				
