= 1990 Westminster City Council election =

1990 local election in England

- 3 May 1990

All 60 council seats of the Westminster City Council 31 seats needed for a majority
- Registered: 107,989
- Turnout: 55,648, 51.53%

	First party	Second party	Third party
Leader	Shirley Porter	Unknown	Unknown
Party	Conservative	Labour	Liberal Democrats
Leader since	1983	Unknown	Unknown
Leader's seat	Hyde Park	Unknown	Unknown
Seats before	32	27	0
Seats won	45	15	0
Seat change	▲13	▼12	Steady
Popular vote	77,054	54,229	7,894
Percentage	53.99%	37.99%	5.53%
Council control before election
Conservative
Subsequent council control
Conservative

The 1990 Westminster Council election took place on 3 May 1990 to elect members of Westminster City Council in London, England. The whole council was up for election and the Conservative Party stayed in overall control of the council.

== Election result ==
1990 Westminster City Council Election
Party	Seats	Gains	Losses	Net gain/loss	Seats %	Votes %	Votes	+/−
Conservative	45	13	0	▲13	70.00	53.99	77,054	
Labour	15	0	12	▼12	30.00	37.99	54,229	
Liberal Democrats	0	0	0	Steady	0.00	5.53	7,894	
Green	0	0	0	Steady	0.00	1.08	1,544	
Ind. Residents	0	0	1	▼1	0.00	0.70	998	
Independent	0	0	0	Steady	0.00	0.62	881	
SDP	0	0	0	Steady	0.00	0.09	130	
Total	60						142,730	

== Ward results ==
(*) - Indicates an incumbent candidate

(†) - Indicates an incumbent councillor who is running in a different seat than the one they were elected

=== Baker Street ===
Baker Street (2)
Party	Candidate	Votes	%
Conservative	Angela M. Hooper*	862	70.31
Conservative	Marie-Louise E. Rossi*	847	
Labour	Brenda J. Buxton	282	23.03
Labour	Derek J. Buckland	278	
Liberal Democrats	June C. Strick	84	6.66
Liberal Democrats	Michael D. Holmans	78	
Registered electors		2,794	
Turnout		1,264	45.24
Rejected ballots		4	0.32
Conservative hold			
Conservative hold			

=== Bayswater ===
Bayswater (3)
Party	Candidate	Votes	%
Conservative	Anne E. Barns	1,673	48.33
Conservative	Michael C. Brahams	1,582	
Conservative	Bryony L.M. Griffiths	1,530	
Labour	Barrie K. Taylor*	1,235	35.67
Labour	Christopher M. Ward	1,148	
Labour	John B. Thirlwell*	1,147	
Green	Annette L. Coward	255	7.73
Liberal Democrats	Susan M. Baring	216	6.54
Independent	Abdulla J. Dharamsi	57	1.73
Registered electors		5,236	
Turnout		3,120	59.59
Rejected ballots		9	0.29
Conservative gain from Labour			
Conservative gain from Labour			
Conservative gain from Labour			

=== Belgrave ===
Belgrave (2)
Party	Candidate	Votes	%
Conservative	Elizabeth A. Flach*	1,265	84.01
Conservative	Elizabeth F.M. Blois*	1,246	
Labour	Mair E. Garside	207	13.65
Labour	Michael P. Gilgunn	200	
Liberal Democrats	Helen Mann	42	2.34
Liberal Democrats	Angela M. Whitelegge	27	
Registered electors		3,604	
Turnout		1,634	45.34
Rejected ballots		2	0.12
Conservative hold			
Conservative hold			

=== Bryanston ===
Bryanston (2)
Party	Candidate	Votes	%
Conservative	Jennifer Bianco*	973	73.97
Conservative	John Bull*	958	
Labour	Barbara A. Coates	268	19.83
Labour	Robert B. Coates	250	
Liberal Democrats	Marilyn Merryweather	81	6.20
Registered electors		2,871	
Turnout		1,338	46.60
Rejected ballots		5	0.37
Conservative hold			
Conservative hold			

=== Cavendish ===
Cavendish (3)
Party	Candidate	Votes	%
Conservative	Harvey C.J. Marshall	1,521	53.99
Conservative	David A. Berens	1,495	
Conservative	Nicholas F. Markham	1,489	
Labour	Paul H. Dimoldenberg	999	34.83
Labour	Hilary L. Allen	964	
Labour	Daniel J. Carlen	943	
Green	Peta L. Masters	207	7.44
Liberal Democrats	Roland S. Bond	110	3.74
Liberal Democrats	Colin E. Wing	97	
Registered electors		5,283	
Turnout		2,725	51.58
Rejected ballots		3	0.11
Conservative hold			
Conservative hold			
Conservative hold			

=== Church Street ===
Church Street (3)
Party	Candidate	Votes	%
Labour	Jennifer F. Edwards	1,795	66.92
Labour	Gavin J Millar*	1,725	
Labour	Richard H. Nicholls*	1,723	
Conservative	Jean V. Morris	877	33.08
Conservative	Laura S. Mendoza	870	
Conservative	Simon R. Lapthorne	846	
Registered electors		5,818	
Turnout		2,830	48.64
Rejected ballots		11	0.39
Labour hold			
Labour hold			
Labour hold			

=== Churchill ===
Churchill (3)
Party	Candidate	Votes	%
Conservative	Andreas N. Gledhill	1,758	41.25
Conservative	Duncan J. Goldie-Scot	1,734	
Conservative	William A. Griffiths	1,722	
Labour	Margaret M Cavalla*	1,350	29.91
Labour	Charles M. Phillipps	1,224	
Labour	Ron M. Harley	1,206	
Lib Dem Focus Team	Jane Smithard	1,097	25.78
Lib Dem Focus Team	Alastair Bowman	1,086	
Lib Dem Focus Team	Guy Halliwell	1,076	
Green	Julia M. Ponsonby	129	3.06
Registered electors		6,341	
Turnout		4,341	68.46
Rejected ballots		12	0.28
Conservative gain from Labour			
Conservative gain from Labour			
Conservative gain from Labour			

=== Hamilton Terrace ===
Hamilton Terrace (2)
Party	Candidate	Votes	%
Conservative	Katherine P. Ivens	1,225	61.48
Conservative	Judith A. Warner*	1,217	
Lib Dem Focus Team	Richard J. de Ste Croix	476	23.82
Lib Dem Focus Team	Paul Strang	469	
Labour	Edward C. Richards	193	9.62
Labour	John J. Barry	188	
Green	John Papworth	101	5.09
Registered electors		3,517	
Turnout		2,009	57.12
Rejected ballots		2	0.10
Conservative hold			
Conservative hold			

=== Harrow Road ===
Harrow Road (3)
Party	Candidate	Votes	%
Labour	Joseph Glickman*	1,709	60.01
Labour	Jillian A. Selbourne*	1,672	
Labour	Alan G. Lazarus	1,643	
Conservative	Douglas T. Jacobs	909	31.92
Conservative	Alexander S. Aiken	885	
Conservative	Peter D. Clarke	879	
Green	William J. Welch	245	8.06
Green	Philip S. Chetwode-Ram	204	
Registered electors		5,953	
Turnout		2,959	49.71
Rejected ballots		2	0.07
Labour hold			
Labour hold			
Labour hold			

=== Hyde Park ===
Hyde Park (3)
Party	Candidate	Votes	%
Conservative	Shirley Porter*	1,281	68.29
Conservative	Pamela J.J. Batty*	1,268	
Conservative	Anne M. Mallinson*	1,236	
Labour	Linda Julian^{†}	320	16.83
Labour	Jill B. Carlen	314	
Labour	Peter J. Carlen	299	
Green	Caroline M.G. Austin	167	9.04
Liberal Democrats	Mura A. Blackburn	132	5.84
Liberal Democrats	Matthew M. Lambert	107	
Liberal Democrats	Rodney R.T. Smith	86	
Registered electors		4,242	
Turnout		1,857	43.78
Rejected ballots		3	0.16
Conservative hold			
Conservative hold			
Conservative hold			

=== Knightsbridge ===
Knightsbridge (2)
Party	Candidate	Votes	%
Conservative	Robert J. Moreland	857	61.42
Conservative	Robert S.J. Michaels	852	
Independent	Peter J. Finley	420	29.60
Independent	Christopher J. Owen	404	
Labour	Una Cooze	100	6.25
Labour	Ivy Searle	74	
Liberal Democrats	Alison Bailey	39	2.73
Liberal Democrats	Elizabeth Mackieth	37	
Registered electors		2,976	
Turnout		1,419	47.68
Rejected ballots		2	0.14
Conservative hold			
Conservative hold			

=== Lancaster Gate ===
Lancaster Gate (3)
Party	Candidate	Votes	%
Conservative	Olga Polizzi*	1,236	64.26
Conservative	Robert J. Davis*	1,202	
Conservative	Simon H. Milton*	1,198	
Labour	Francis M. Prideaux	473	23.23
Labour	Gerald Ramsbottom	428	
Labour	Trevor G. Sheppard	413	
Green	Sarah J. Buckmaster	236	12.51
Registered electors		4,475	
Turnout		1,895	42.35
Rejected ballots		6	0.32
Conservative hold			
Conservative hold			
Conservative hold			

=== Little Venice ===
Little Venice (3)
Party	Candidate	Votes	%
Conservative	Melvyn B. Caplan	1,704	53.74
Conservative	Anthony P.R. Alford	1,680	
Conservative	Julia K. Hunt	1,680	
Labour	Isla Robertson*	1,285	40.47
Labour	Linda C. Hardman	1,274	
Labour	David E.R. Obaze*	1,255	
Liberal Democrats	Paul E.M. Reynolds	182	5.79
Registered electors		5,298	
Turnout		3,150	59.46
Rejected ballots		4	0.13
Conservative gain from Labour			
Conservative gain from Labour			
Conservative gain from Labour			

=== Lord's ===
Lord's (2)
Party	Candidate	Votes	%
Conservative	Cyril H. Nemeth*	1,364	71.58
Conservative	Kevin A. Gardner*	1,336	
Labour	Barbara J. Grahame	469	21.53
Labour	Ramesh Shukla	343	
SDP	Joe Aveline	130	6.89
Registered electors		3,880	
Turnout		1,948	50.21
Rejected ballots		2	0.10
Conservative hold			
Conservative hold			

=== Maida Vale ===
Maida Vale (3)
Party	Candidate	Votes	%
Conservative	Martin Jiggens	1,575	48.68
Conservative	Ronald C.M. Raymond-Cox	1,574	
Conservative	James L. Thorley	1,541	
Labour	Denis N. Coleman*	1,449	44.69
Labour	David J. Pitt-Watson*	1,429	
Labour	Jacqueline M. Rosenberg*	1,428	
Liberal Democrats	Edwena A. Couchman	213	6.63
Registered electors		5,376	
Turnout		3,254	60.53
Rejected ballots		8	0.25
Conservative gain from Labour			
Conservative gain from Labour			
Conservative gain from Labour			

=== Millbank ===
Millbank (3)
Party	Candidate	Votes	%
Labour	Peter C.S. Bradley*	1,507	51.83
Labour	Hugh G. Garside*	1,488	
Labour	Peter D. Wright*	1,468	
Conservative	Harry Haynes	1,317	42.84
Conservative	Victoria L. Roberts	1,207	
Conservative	Geeta G. Kaur-Sidhu	1,166	
Liberal Democrats	Margaret Lang	169	5.33
Liberal Democrats	Hugo D. Dixon	161	
Liberal Democrats	Janice Taverne	130	
Registered electors		5,395	
Turnout		3,080	57.09
Rejected ballots		5	0.16
Labour hold			
Labour hold			
Labour hold			

=== Queen's Park ===
Queen's Park (3)
Party	Candidate	Votes	%
Labour	Margaret E. Cahill*	1,613	64.43
Labour	Karen P. Buck	1,606	
Labour	Mary W. Nicholas*	1,569	
Conservative	David J. Brown	724	27.70
Conservative	Sarah Livingstone	721	
Conservative	Mark Prisk	614	
Liberal Democrats	Gertrude E. Haywood	195	7.87
Registered electors		5,497	
Turnout		2,652	48.24
Rejected ballots		14	0.53
Labour hold			
Labour hold			
Labour hold			

=== Regent's Park ===
Regent's Park (3)
Party	Candidate	Votes	%
Conservative	Reginald W. Forrester*	1,981	68.29
Conservative	Roger J.L. Bramble*	1,932	
Conservative	Barry C. Legg*	1,878	
Labour	Sidney Norden	659	22.47
Labour	Walter K. Philips	639	
Labour	John A. Wilson	608	
Liberal Democrats	Lewis J. Wigoder	261	9.24
Registered electors		5,782	
Turnout		2,853	49.34
Rejected ballots		9	0.32
Conservative hold			
Conservative hold			
Conservative hold			

=== St George's ===
St George's (3)
Party	Candidate	Votes	%
Conservative	Alan Bradley*	2,251	73.31
Conservative	Davd P. Weeks*	2,173	
Conservative	Benjamin A. Segal*	2,170	
Labour	Sir Ernest A. Bramall	616	19.65
Labour	Angela Forrester	590	
Labour	Maurice S. Miller	562	
Liberal Democrats	John B.A. Barton	225	7.04
Liberal Democrats	Maurice E. Coleman	209	
Liberal Democrats	Evelyn S. Todman	199	
Registered electors		6,267	
Turnout		3,036	48.44
Rejected ballots		6	0.20
Conservative hold			
Conservative hold			
Conservative hold			

=== St James's ===
St James's (2)
Party	Candidate	Votes	%
Conservative	Simon E. Brocklebank-Fowler	956	58.00
Conservative	Carolyn R. Keen	913	
Labour	Arthur C. Smith	608	37.16
Labour	Allan C. Wylie	590	
Liberal Democrats	Nigel G. Bliss	82	4.84
Liberal Democrats	Josephine M. Hayes	74	
Registered electors		3,344	
Turnout		1,684	50.36
Rejected ballots		0	0.00
Conservative hold			
Conservative hold			

=== Victoria ===
Victoria (2)
Party	Candidate	Votes	%
Conservative	David J. Harvey*	1,143	64.63
Conservative	Peter M. Young*	1,123	
Labour	Martin H. Garside	574	31.09
Labour	Simon J. Winters	515	
Liberal Democrats	Caroline F. Shorten	77	4.28
Liberal Democrats	Josephine M. Hayes	73	
Registered electors		3,776	
Turnout		1,896	50.21
Rejected ballots		3	0.16
Conservative hold			
Conservative hold			

=== Westbourne ===
Westbourne (3)
Party	Candidate	Votes	%
Labour	Vincent Allan*	1,688	56.07
Labour	Joan B. Provost*	1,582	
Labour	Andrew H. Dismore*	1,581	
Conservative	Duncan R.L. Boyd	1,013	33.39
Conservative	Richard Simmons	975	
Conservative	Charles A.H. Villiers	901	
Liberal Democrats	Morag G. Beattie	304	10.54
Registered electors		6,074	
Turnout		2,907	47.86
Rejected ballots		5	0.17
Labour hold			
Labour hold			
Labour hold			

=== West End ===
West End (2)
Party	Candidate	Votes	%
Conservative	David J. Avery*	1,028	57.15
Conservative	Peter J. Martindale	921	
Independent	Lois J. Peltz*	564	29.25
Independent	Matthew Bennett	434	
Labour	Paul M. Gamble	237	13.60
Labour	Annette Pink	227	
Registered electors		4,190	
Turnout		1,797	42.89
Rejected ballots		2	0.11
Conservative gain from Ind. Residents			
Conservative hold			
