= Queen's Park and Maida Vale =

UK Parliament constituency (since 2024)

- Borough constituency for the House of Commons
- Interactive map of boundaries from 2024
- Location within Greater London
- County: Greater London
- Electorate: 75,256 (March 2020)

Current constituency
- Created: 2024
- Member of Parliament: Georgia Gould (Labour)
- Seats: One
- Created from: Westminster North, Brent Central and Hampstead and Kilburn

Queen's Park and Maida Vale is a constituency in Greater London represented in the House of Commons of the UK Parliament. Further to the completion of the 2023 review of Westminster constituencies, it was first contested at the 2024 general election.

The Member of Parliament (MP) elected in 2024 is Georgia Gould of the Labour Party, with 52.5% of the vote. She defeated six candidates, with second place taken by the Green Party on 13.6%, ahead of the Conservative Party, who had generally come second in the predecessor constituencies.

== Constituency profile ==
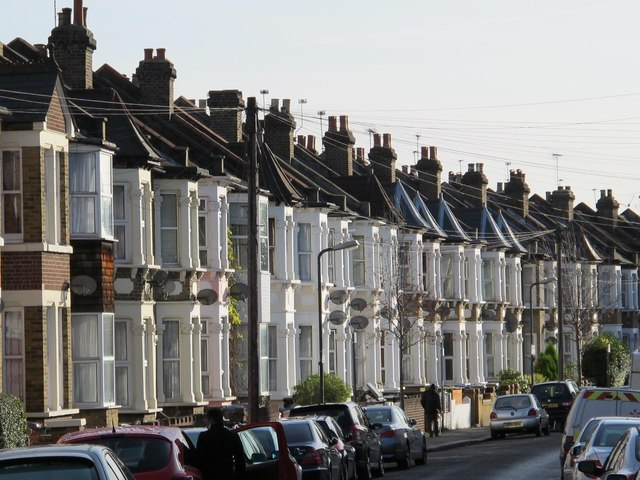
Wendover Road, Harlesden

Queen's Park and Maida Vale is a constituency in Greater London in England, covering parts of the City of Westminster and the Borough of Brent. It includes the areas of Queen's Park, Maida Vale, Lisson Grove, Harlesden and parts of Kilburn.

This constituency covers diverse, densely-populated suburbs of London located around 4 miles (6.4 km) north-west of the city centre. Maida Vale is an affluent neighbourhood of large Victorian terraces, however the rest of the constituency is generally deprived, particularly in Lisson Grove and Harlesden. Lisson Grove contains large quantities of council housing and Harlesden has a working-class heritage; the area was home to many labourers who worked at the adjacent Park Royal industrial estate. Despite this, the constituency's location close to central London means that house prices are generally higher than the rest of the city. The average house price is more than triple the UK average.

Queen's Park and Maida Vale has a large population of young adults and a low proportion of retirees. The average household income is lower than the rest of London and the homeownership rate is very low. The child poverty rate is in line with the overall UK figure. Residents are generally well-educated and a high proportion work in the education, accommodation and arts sectors. The percentage claiming unemployment benefits is high.

This constituency is ethnically diverse. White people made up 47% of residents at the 2021 census, just under half of whom are of non-British origin including large Irish, French and Italian communities. Black people were 17% of the population, mostly concentrated in Harlesden which is known for its Afro-Caribbean culture. Asians made up 14% of residents.

At the local council level, most of the constituency is represented by Labour Party councillors. Some Conservatives were elected in Maida Vale, Liberal Democrats in Queen's Park and Green Party representatives in Kilburn. Voters in the constituency strongly supported remaining in the European Union in the 2016 referendum; an estimated 67% voted to remain compared to the UK-wide rate of 48%.

== Boundaries ==
The constituency comprises the following areas:

- The City of Westminster wards of Church Street, Harrow Road, Little Venice, Maida Vale, Queen's Park and Westbourne, comprising the majority of the abolished constituency of Westminster North.
- The Borough of Brent wards of Harlesden & Kensal Green, Kilburn, and Queens Park, transferred partly from Brent Central (renamed Brent East) and partly from Hampstead and Kilburn (renamed Hampstead and Highgate).

== Members of Parliament ==
Election	Member	Party
2024	Georgia Gould	Labour

== Elections ==
=== Elections in the 2020s ===
General election 2024: Queen's Park and Maida Vale
Party	Candidate	Votes	%	±%
Labour	Georgia Gould	20,126	52.5	−9.4
Green	Vivien Lichtenstein	5,213	13.6	+10.4
Conservative	Samia Hersi	5,088	13.3	−6.5
Liberal Democrats	Helen Baxter	3,417	8.9	−5.0
Reform	Angela Carter-Begbie	2,106	5.5	+4.6
Workers Party	Irakli Menabde	1,792	4.7	N/A
Independent	Abdulla Dharamsi	601	1.6	N/A
Majority		14,913	38.9	−3.2
Turnout		38,343	50.7	−8.8
Registered electors		75,558		
Labour hold		Swing	−9.9	

=== Elections in the 2010s ===
2019 notional result
Party	Vote	%
Labour	27,739	61.9
Conservative	8,865	19.8
Liberal Democrats	6,230	13.9
Green	1,437	3.2
Brexit Party	413	0.9
Others	115	0.3
Turnout	44,799	59.5
Electorate	75,256	
