= Anne Weyman =

British executive (born 1943)

Anne Weyman OBE
- Born: Anne Judith Weyman; 1 February 1943 (age 83)
- Known for: Former Chief Executive of the Family Planning Association
- Website: www.anneweyman.org

Anne Judith Weyman OBE (born 1 February 1943) is a British executive. She was Chief Executive of the Family Planning Association from 1996 to 2008 and is a Member of the General Medical Council. She is a trustee of the Galapagos Conservation Trust and vice-chair of Britain for Europe, a group campaigning for continued UK membership of the European Union.

== Biography ==
Weyman was born 1 February 1943 to Stanley Weyman and Rose Weyman. She attended Tollington Grammar School, the University of Bristol, where she read for a BSc in physics, and LSE, where she read for a BSc in sociology.

She married Christopher Leonard Bulford in 1977. The following year, she was elected to Westminster City Council, representing the Little Venice ward as a Labour councillor. She did not contest her seat at the 1982 election. Her hobbies include gardening, theatre, music, table tennis and opera.

== Honours ==
- OBE in 2000 for services to family planning.
- Honorary Doctor of Laws (LLD) from Bristol University in 2005 for contribution to Human Rights and especially Women's Rights.

== Selected bibliography ==
- Weyman, Anne; Westergaard, John; Wiles, Paul (1977). Modern British society: a bibliography. New York: St. Martin's Press. ISBN 9780312537753.
- Weyman, Anne; Unell, Judith (1985). Finding and running premises: a guide for voluntary organisations. London: Bedford Square Press. ISBN 9780719911293.
- Weyman, Anne; Unell, Judith; Capper, Sally (1989). Starting and running a voluntary group. London: Bedford Square. ISBN 9780719912498.
- Weyman, Anne; Moss, Catti; Carter, Yvonne (1998). RCGP handbook of sexual health in primary care. London: Royal College of General Practitioners. ISBN 9780850842388.
- Weyman, Anne; Duggan, Maria (1999). Individual choices, collective responsibility: sexual health, a public health issue. London: Family Planning Association. ISBN 9781899194810.
- Weyman, Anne; Berer, Marge; Kapczynski, Amy (1999). Sexual and reproductive health and rights in the UK: 5 years on from Cairo. London: Family Planning Association. ISBN 9781899194919.
