= Maida Vale (ward) =

Electoral ward in London, England

- Electoral ward for the Westminster City Council
- Borough: Westminster
- County: Greater London

Current electoral ward
- Created: 1965
- GSS code: E05013800 (2022–present)

Maida Vale is an electoral ward of the City of Westminster. The population at the 2011 Census was 10,210. The ward covers the area south of Kilburn, north of Little Venice and west of St John's Wood, bordered by Maida Vale (A5), Shirland Road, Sutherland Avenue and Kilburn Park Road. The ward contains Paddington Recreation Ground, Lauderdale Road Spanish & Portuguese Synagogue, Saint Augustine's church and is home to the BBC Maida Vale Studios. The area is served by Maida Vale station on the Bakerloo line, in addition to several bus routes running through the locality. There are two primary schools, Essendine Primary School and St Augustine's Primary School, two secondary schools, St Augustine's CE High School and St. George's Catholic School, in addition to three GP surgeries located in the ward.

The original Maida Vale ward, created in 1964, was larger in size and elected five councillors. For the May 1978 election, the ward was split into two: Maida Vale and Little Venice, each electing three councillors. There were minor boundary changes in 2002 and 2022.

The ward currently returns three councillors to Westminster City Council, with an election every four years. At the last election in May 2022, three candidates from the Labour Party were elected to represent the ward.

== Councillors ==
=== 1978–present ===
Three councillors represent Maida Vale ward. Notable past councillors include former MPs Lee Rowley (2006 to 2014) and Michael Shersby (1972 to 1997) and entrepreneur David Pitt-Watson (1986 to 1990).

Election	Councillor	Councillor	Councillor
2022	Geoffrey Barraclough (Lab)	Iman Less (Lab)	Nafsika Butler-Thalassis (Lab)
2018	Geoffrey Barraclough (Lab)	Rita Begum (Lab)	Nafsika Butler-Thalassis (Lab)
2014	Jan Prendergast (Con)	Rita Begum (Lab)	Thomas Crockett (Con)
2010	Jan Prendergast (Con)	Alastair Moss (Con)	Lee Rowley (Con)
2006	Jan Prendergast (Con)	Alastair Moss (Con)	Lee Rowley (Con)
2002	Jan Prendergast (Con)	Alastair Moss (Con)	Ronald Raymond-Cox (Con)
1998	Jan Prendergast (Con)	Susie Burbridge (Con)	Ronald Raymond-Cox (Con)
1994	Jan Prendergast (Con)	Martin Jiggens (Con)	Ronald Raymond-Cox (Con)
1990	James Thorley (Con)	Martin Jiggens (Con)	Ronald Raymond-Cox (Con)
1986	Neale Coleman (Lab)	Jacqueline Rosenberg (Lab)	David Pitt-Watson (Lab)
1982	Neale Coleman (Lab)	William McElroy (Lab)	Susan Wolff (Lab)
1978	Jeffrey Walker (Con)	Peter Hartley (Con)	Michael Farrow (Con)

=== 1964–1978 ===
Five councillors represented Maida Vale ward between 1964 and 1978.

Election	Councillor	Councillor	Councillor	Councillor	Councillor
1974	Tim Daniel (Lab)	June Bremner (Lab)	Keith Baker (Lab)	Joan Mulley (Lab)	William Robins (Lab)
1971	Tim Daniel (Lab)	June Bremner (Lab)	Peter Merriton (Lab)	Joan Mulley (Lab)	William Robins (Lab)
1968	William Brooks (Con)	Elsie Lane (Con)	Herbert Hodgson (Con)	Gerard Wade (Con)	Michael Shersby (Con)
1966 by-election*	William Brooks (Con)	Elsie Lane (Con)	Raymond Brown (Con)	Gerard Wade (Con)	Michael Shersby (Con)
1964	William Brooks (Con)	Elsie Lane (Con)	Raymond Brown (Con)	George O'Connell (Con)	Michael Shersby (Con)

*1966 by-election caused by the death of George O'Connell.

== Election results ==
Like the other wards of Westminster, Maida Vale is represented by three councillors on Westminster City Council. The last election was held on 5 May 2022, when all three councillors were elected representing the Labour Party. Candidates seeking re-election are marked with an asterisk (*).

=== 2022 election ===
Maida Vale ward election, 5 May 2022
Party	Candidate	Votes	%	±%
Labour	Geoffrey Mark Barraclough*	1,590	62.5	
Labour	Nafsika Butler-Thalassis*	1,531	60.2	
Labour	Iman Less	1,411	55.5	
Conservative	Jan Prendergast	833	32.8	
Conservative	Mohammed Janal	719	28.3	
Conservative	Iheoma Oteh	689	27.1	
Liberal Democrats	Harriet Elizabeth Sergeant	247	9.7	
Liberal Democrats	James Joshua Nisbet	168	6.6	
Liberal Democrats	Peter Howard Toeman	139	5.5	
Turnout		2,543	34.02	
Labour hold		Swing		
Labour hold		Swing		
Labour hold		Swing		

=== 2018 election ===
Maida Vale ward, 3 May 2018
Party	Candidate	Votes	%	±%
Labour	Geoff Barraclough	1,306	47.9	+11.6
Labour	Rita Begum *	1,301	47.8	+4.4
Labour	Nafsika Butler-Thalassis	1,254	46.0	+10.8
Conservative	Jan Prendergast *	1,195	43.9	−6.0
Conservative	Amanda Lilian Langford	1,084	39.8	−3.6
Conservative	Nathan Patrick Parsad	1,079	39.6	+2.8
Green	Lynnet Jane Pready	246	9.0	−7.3
Liberal Democrats	Haude Jeanne Rose Lannon Polner	202	7.4	−4.4
Liberal Democrats	Michael Francis Cox	160	5.9	N/A
Liberal Democrats	Charles Jack Goodman	157	5.8	N/A
Majority		59	2.1	
Turnout		7984	40.8	+5.0
Labour gain from Conservative		Swing		
Labour hold		Swing		
Labour gain from Conservative		Swing		

=== 2014 election ===
Maida Vale ward, 22 May 2014
Party	Candidate	Votes	%	±%
Conservative	Jan Prendergast *	1,222	49.9	
Labour	Rita Begum	1,063	43.4	
Conservative	Thomas Crockett	1,063	43.4	
Conservative	Frixos Tombolis	902	36.8	
Labour	Eram Ayub	889	36.3	
Labour	Romena Toki	861	35.2	
Green	Peter William Ronald Duke	399	16.3	
Liberal Democrats	Peter James Welch	288	11.8	
Majority		161	6.6	
Turnout		6687	35.8	−22.0
Conservative hold		Swing		
Labour gain from Conservative		Swing		
Conservative hold		Swing		

=== 2010 election ===
Maida Vale ward, 6 May 2010
Party	Candidate	Votes	%	±%
Conservative	Jan Prendergast *	2,085		
Conservative	Alastair Moss *	1,794		
Conservative	Lee Rowley *	1,724		
Labour	Peter Denton	1,413		
Labour	John Edwards	1,193		
Labour	Ewan McGaughey	1,170		
Liberal Democrats	Marianne Magnin	806		
Liberal Democrats	Mark Gray	726		
Green	Peter Duke	569		
UKIP	Simon Seligman	79		
Majority				
Turnout				
Conservative hold		Swing		
Conservative hold		Swing		
Conservative hold		Swing		

=== 2006 election ===
Maida Vale ward, 4 May 2006
Party	Candidate	Votes	%	±%
Conservative	Jan Prendergast *	1,489		
Conservative	Alastair Moss *	1,406		
Conservative	Lee Rowley	1,357		
Labour	Mark Davies	535		
Labour	Peter Denton	522		
Labour	Adam Kravitz	497		
Liberal Democrats	Anne Couchman	294		
Liberal Democrats	Neville Farmer	263		
Liberal Democrats	Zena Lutrin	247		
Majority				
Turnout				
Conservative hold		Swing		
Conservative hold		Swing		
Conservative hold		Swing		

=== 2002 election ===
Maida Vale ward, 4 May 2002
Party	Candidate	Votes	%	±%
Conservative	Jan Prendergast *	1,179		
Conservative	Ronald Raymond-Cox *	1,108		
Conservative	Alastair Moss	1,066		
Labour	David Lancaster	780		
Labour	Syed Hayat	762		
Labour	Albert Catterall	745		
Liberal Democrats	Anne Couchman	279		
Liberal Democrats	Robert Scott	237		
Liberal Democrats	Zena Lutrin	201		
Majority				
Turnout				
Conservative hold		Swing		
Conservative hold		Swing		
Conservative hold		Swing		

== See also ==
- Little Venice ward
