= 2022 Westminster City Council election =

2022 local election in Westminster

2022 Westminster Council election
- 5 May 2022

All 54 council seats of the Westminster City Council 28 seats needed for a majority
	First party	Second party
Leader	Adam Hug	Rachael Robathan
Party	Labour	Conservative
Last election	19 seats, 41.1%	41 seats, 42.8%
Seats won	31	23
Seat change	▲12	▼18
Popular vote	58,395	49,067
Percentage	48.0%	40.3%
Swing	▲6.9pp	▼2.5pp
- 2022 Westminster Borough Council election results map with 2022 wards
council control before election
Conservative
Subsequent council control
Labour

The 2022 Westminster City Council election took place on 5 May 2022. All 54 members of Westminster City Council were elected. The elections took place alongside local elections in the other London boroughs and elections to local authorities across the United Kingdom.

In the previous election in 2018, the Conservative Party had maintained their longstanding control of the council, winning 41 out of the 60 seats with the Labour Party forming the council opposition with the remaining 19 seats. However, in 2022 Labour won an 8-seat council majority for the first time since the formation of the modern city in 1964. The 2022 election took place under new election boundaries, which reduced the number of councillors to 54.

== Background ==
=== History ===
Result of the 2018 borough election

The thirty-two London boroughs were established in 1965 by the London Government Act 1963. They are the principal authorities in Greater London and have responsibilities including education, housing, planning, highways, social services, libraries, recreation, waste, environmental health and revenue collection. Some of the powers are shared with the Greater London Authority, which also manages passenger transport, police, and fire.

Westminster City Council had continuously been under Conservative Party control since its establishment. In the most recent election in 2018, Westminster was considered a key target for Labour in London. The Conservatives won the election, with 41 seats on 42.8% of the vote across the borough, while Labour won 19 seats, with 41.1% of the vote.

=== Council term ===
The Conservative councillor Robert Davis, who represented Lancaster Gate and had served on the council since 1982, resigned after an investigation into his conduct found that he broke the councillors' code of conduct for receiving a large number of gifts and hospitality from property developers. The 22 November 2018 by-election was held for the Conservatives by Margot Bright with the Labour candidate coming in second place. In March 2021, Andrea Mann, a Labour councillor for Churchill ward, resigned for family reasons. The by-election to fill the seat was held on 6 May 2021 alongside the 2021 London mayoral election and London Assembly election. The Labour candidate Liza Begum won, with an increased majority compared to the 2018 election.

Along with most London boroughs, this election occurred under new ward boundaries. Following local consultation, the Local Government Boundary Commission for England produced new boundaries, reducing the number of councillors from 60 to 54 across eighteen three-councillor wards.

== Campaign ==
The Conservative peer Robert Hayward listed Westminster as one of four Conservative councils in London that his party risked losing control of in the wake of the partygate scandal. The concentration of Labour voters in a small number of wards means that relatively few seats in the borough are marginal. Labour criticised the Conservative council for the Marble Arch Mound's cost, which had led to the resignation of the council's deputy leader Melvyn Caplan. Fitzrovia News wrote that the new West End ward would be competitive between Labour and the Conservatives, with Labour having won one of the three seats on previous boundaries.

== Electoral process ==
Westminster, as with all other London borough councils, elects all of its councillors at once every four years, with the previous election having taken place in 2018. At the same time elections were held for the 12 seats of Queen's Park Community Council, the Parish council in the north west of the city, with these being administered by the Returning Officer at the City Council and both elections were counted together overnight.

The elections took place by multi-member first-past-the-post voting, with each ward being represented by three councillors. Electors had as many votes as there are councillors to be elected in their ward, with the top three being elected.

All registered electors (British, Irish, Commonwealth and European Union citizens) living in London aged 18 or over were entitled to vote in the election. People who lived at two addresses in different councils, such as university students with different term-time and holiday addresses, were entitled to be registered for and vote in elections in both local authorities. Voting in-person at polling stations took place from 7:00 to 22:00 on election day, and voters were able to apply for postal votes or proxy votes in advance of the election.

== Previous council composition ==
Councillors after the 2018 election

Councillors ahead of the 2022 election

After 2018 election		Before 2022 election	
Party	Seats	Party	Seats
Conservative	41	Conservative	41
Labour	19	Labour	19

== Results summary ==
2022 Westminster City Council election
Party	Seats	Gains	Losses	Net gain/loss	Seats %	Votes %	Votes	+/−
Labour	31	12	0	▲12	58.5	46.3	20,347	+6.0
Conservative	23	0	12	▼18	41.5	38.6	16,984	-3.3
Liberal Democrats	0	0	0	Steady	0.0	12.7	5,572	+2.9
Green	0	0	0	Steady	0.0	2.1	930	-3.6
Independent	0	0	0	Steady	0.0	0.3	124	±0.0

== Ward results ==
Candidates seeking re-election are marked with an asterisk (*). Councillors seeking re-election for a different ward are marked with a cross (†).

=== Abbey Road ===
Abbey Road (3 seats)
Party	Candidate	Votes	%	±%
Conservative	Amanda Langford	1,241	50.6	
Conservative	Caroline Sargent	1,199	48.9	
Conservative	Alan Mendoza	1,193	48.6	
Labour	Sarah Hanson	803	32.7	
Labour	James Evans	770	31.4	
Labour	Sheyda Monshizadeh-Azar	702	28.6	
Liberal Democrats	Trish Griffiths	367	15.0	
Green	Cristian Dinu	311	12.7	
Liberal Democrats	Christopher Gunness	231	9.4	
Liberal Democrats	Seth Weisz	204	8.3	
Turnout		2,454	31.58	
Conservative win (new boundaries)				
Conservative win (new boundaries)				
Conservative win (new boundaries)				

=== Bayswater ===
Bayswater (3 seats)
Party	Candidate	Votes	%	±%
Labour	Maggie Carman*	1,618	60.1	+20.5
Labour	Max Sullivan	1,481	55.0	+19.3
Labour	James Small-Edwards	1,476	54.8	+21.7
Conservative	Anna Askew	910	33.8	−5.6
Conservative	Iain Bott†	875	32.5	−6.9
Conservative	Henry Shelford	792	29.4	−7.1
Liberal Democrats	Scott Caizley	276	10.3	−10.4
Liberal Democrats	Jane Smithard	266	9.9	−9.9
Liberal Democrats	Nathalie Ubilava	219	8.1	−9.4
Turnout		2,692	33.80	−5.9
Labour win (new boundaries)				
Labour win (new boundaries)				
Labour win (new boundaries)				

=== Church Street ===
Church Street (3 seats)
Party	Candidate	Votes	%	±%
Labour	Aicha Less*	1,303	70.6	
Labour	Matt Noble*	1,249	67.7	
Labour	Abdul Toki*	1,219	66.1	
Conservative	Blessings Kaseke	347	18.8	
Conservative	Amarjeet Singh Johal	318	17.2	
Conservative	Jaime Law	308	16.7	+2.0
Liberal Democrats	William Dunbar	143	7.8	
Liberal Democrats	Rachael Jagger	142	7.7	
Liberal Democrats	Patrick Ryan	139	7.5	
Turnout		1,845	25.85	
Labour win (new boundaries)				
Labour win (new boundaries)				
Labour win (new boundaries)				

=== Harrow Road ===
Harrow Road (3 seats)
Party	Candidate	Votes	%	±%
Labour	Ruth Bush*	1,524	72.7	
Labour	Concia Albert	1,492	71.2	
Labour	Tim Roca*	1,444	68.9	
Conservative	Helen Lambert	381	18.2	
Conservative	Tom Haynes	362	17.3	
Conservative	Sam Parr	328	15.7	
Liberal Democrats	Will Baynes	219	10.5	
Liberal Democrats	Sharan Tabari	179	8.5	
Turnout		2,095	27.65	
Labour win (new boundaries)				
Labour win (new boundaries)				
Labour win (new boundaries)				

=== Hyde Park ===
Hyde Park (3 seats)
Party	Candidate	Votes	%	±%
Labour	Md Chowdhury	804	44.7	+13.0
Labour	Paul Dimoldenberg†	780	43.4	+12.2
Labour	Judith Southern	774	43.0	+15.2
Conservative	Heather Acton*	758	42.1	−12.6
Conservative	Antonia Cox*	709	39.4	−15.2
Conservative	Zaheed Nizar	659	36.6	−9.4
Liberal Democrats	Sarah Ryan	249	13.8	+1.4
Liberal Democrats	Andrew Byrne	240	13.3	+3.3
Liberal Democrats	Raked Yaghi	165	9.2	−0.3
Turnout		1,799	29.51	−1.79
Labour win (new boundaries)				
Labour win (new boundaries)				
Labour win (new boundaries)				

=== Knightsbridge and Belgravia ===
Knightsbridge and Belgravia (3 seats)
Party	Candidate	Votes	%	±%
Conservative	Elizabeth Hitchcock*	1,263	62.7	−15.9
Conservative	Rachael Robathan*	1,244	61.8	−15.4
Conservative	Tony Devenish*	1,243	61.7	−17.7
Labour	Simon Horbury	486	24.1	+13.8
Labour	Andrew Silverman	438	21.8	+11.5
Labour	Guthrie McKie†	430	21.4	+12.3
Liberal Democrats	Rosamund Durnford-Slater	349	17.3	+6.6
Liberal Democrats	Richard Pyatt	280	13.9	+5.4
Turnout		2,013	29.15	−5.35
Conservative win (new boundaries)				
Conservative win (new boundaries)				
Conservative win (new boundaries)				

=== Lancaster Gate ===
Lancaster Gate (3 seats)
Party	Candidate	Votes	%	±%
Conservative	Laila Dupuy	1,110	44.1	−2.8
Labour	Ellie Ormsby	1,057	42.0	+4.8
Labour	Ryan Jude	1,053	41.8	+5.5
Conservative	Margot Bright	1,051	41.8	−4.4
Labour	Dario Goodwin	1,031	41.0	+9.0
Conservative	Philip Stephenson-Oliver	980	38.9	−7.2
Liberal Democrats	Susan Baring	319	12.7	−4.4
Green	Kathy Hughes	303	12.0	N/A
Liberal Democrats	Benjamin Hurdis	182	7.2	−6.9
Liberal Democrats	Thierry Serero	159	6.3	−5.7
Turnout		2,517	35.76	−2.34
Conservative win (new boundaries)				
Labour win (new boundaries)				
Labour win (new boundaries)				

=== Little Venice ===
Little Venice (3 seats)
Party	Candidate	Votes	%	±%
Conservative	Lorraine Dean*	1,140	46.2	−2.3
Conservative	Melvyn Caplan*	1,136	46.0	−4.2
Labour	Sara Hassan	1,104	44.8	+4.7
Conservative	Matthew Green*	1,088	44.1	−2.0
Labour	Rosie Wrighting	1,071	43.4	+4.3
Labour	Murad Qureshi	1,053	42.7	+4.3
Liberal Democrats	Marianne Magnin	231	9.4	−1.1
Liberal Democrats	Timothy Stokes	196	7.9	−1.5
Liberal Democrats	Bahram Alimoradian	161	6.5	−2.5
Turnout		2,467	37.58	−6.72
Conservative win (new boundaries)				
Conservative win (new boundaries)				
Labour win (new boundaries)				

=== Maida Vale ===
Maida Vale (3 seats)
Party	Candidate	Votes	%	±%
Labour	Geoffrey Barraclough*	1,590	62.5	+14.6
Labour	Nafsika Butler-Thalassis*	1,531	60.2	+14.2
Labour	Iman Less	1,411	55.5	+7.7
Conservative	Jan Prendergast	833	32.8	−11.1
Conservative	Mohammed Janal	719	28.3	−11.1
Conservative	Iheoma Oteh	689	27.1	−12.5
Liberal Democrats	Harriet Sergeant	247	9.7	+2.3
Liberal Democrats	James Nisbet	168	6.6	+0.7
Liberal Democrats	Peter Toeman	139	5.5	−0.3
Turnout		2,543	34.02	−6.78
Labour win (new boundaries)				
Labour win (new boundaries)				
Labour win (new boundaries)				

=== Marylebone ===
Marylebone (3 seats)
Party	Candidate	Votes	%	±%
Conservative	Ian Rowley*	1,186	45.6	
Conservative	Barbara Arzymanow	1,154	44.4	
Conservative	Karen Scarborough*	1,146	44.0	
Liberal Democrats	Alistair Barr	866	33.3	
Liberal Democrats	Elizabeth Botsford	785	30.2	
Liberal Democrats	Freddie Poser	645	24.8	
Labour	Barbara Johnston	583	22.4	
Labour	Jo Broadey	581	22.3	
Labour	Michael Lord	546	21.0	
Turnout		2,602	32.06	
Conservative win (new seat)				
Conservative win (new seat)				
Conservative win (new seat)				

=== Pimlico North ===
Pimlico North (3 seats)
Party	Candidate	Votes	%	±%
Conservative	Jacqui Wilkinson†	1,366	49.9	
Conservative	Jim Glen†	1,327	48.4	
Conservative	Ed Pitt Ford	1,263	46.1	
Labour	Paul Heasman	1,024	37.4	
Labour	Peter Heap	1,021	37.3	
Labour	Eric Robinson	881	32.2	
Liberal Democrats	Tony Coleman	478	17.4	
Liberal Democrats	Sophie Service	382	13.9	
Turnout		2,740	34.91	
Conservative win (new seat)				
Conservative win (new seat)				
Conservative win (new seat)				

=== Pimlico South ===
Pimlico South (3 seats)
Party	Candidate	Votes	%	±%
Labour	Liza Begum	1,516	49.5	
Labour	Robert Eagleton	1,426	46.6	
Labour	Jason Williams	1,350	44.1	
Conservative	James Spencer†	1,271	41.5	
Conservative	Murad Gassanly	1,268	41.4	
Conservative	Greg Conary	1,252	40.9	
Liberal Democrats	Daniel Poole	252	8.2	
Liberal Democrats	Omar Hegazi	216	7.1	
Liberal Democrats	Vikas Aggarwal	207	6.8	
Turnout		3,062	41.16	
Labour win (new seat)				
Labour win (new seat)				
Labour win (new seat)				

=== Queen's Park ===
Queen's Park (3 seats)
Party	Candidate	Votes	%	±%
Labour	Patricia McAllister*	1,691	76.6	
Labour	Cara Sanquest	1,568	71.0	
Labour	Hamza Taouzzale*	1,523	69.0	
Conservative	Hannah Galley	380	17.2	
Conservative	Bota Hopkinson	315	14.3	
Conservative	Emma Sargent	334	15.1	
Liberal Democrats	Helen Toeman	189	8.6	
Liberal Democrats	Jack Dykstra-McCarthy	143	6.5	
Liberal Democrats	Kati Tschawow	113	5.1	
Turnout		2,207	26.61	
Labour win (new boundaries)				
Labour win (new boundaries)				
Labour win (new boundaries)				

=== Regent's Park ===
Regent's Park (3 seats)
Party	Candidate	Votes	%	±%
Conservative	Robert Rigby*	1,140	51.3	
Conservative	Paul Swaddle*	1,097	49.4	
Conservative	Ralu Oteh-Osoka	1,059	47.7	
Labour	Md Haque	696	31.3	
Labour	Kian Richardson	685	30.8	
Labour	Connor Whittam	653	29.4	
Green	Vivien Lichtenstein	316	14.2	
Liberal Democrats	Kathryn Kerle	308	13.9	
Liberal Democrats	Martin Rowe	204	9.2	
Liberal Democrats	Julian Sims	179	8.1	
Turnout		2,221	29.73	
Conservative win (new boundaries)				
Conservative win (new boundaries)				
Conservative win (new boundaries)				

=== St James's ===
St James's (3 seats)
Party	Candidate	Votes	%	±%
Conservative	Louise Hyams*	979	48.0	
Conservative	Tim Mitchell*	965	47.3	
Conservative	Mark Shearer*	954	46.7	
Labour	Karina Darbin	789	38.7	
Labour	Paul Spence	701	34.3	
Labour	Nigel Medforth	700	34.3	
Liberal Democrats	Michael Ahearne	295	14.5	
Liberal Democrats	Paul Diggory	281	13.8	
Liberal Democrats	Alice Wells	249	13.8	
Turnout		2,041	29.63	
Conservative win (new boundaries)				
Conservative win (new boundaries)				
Conservative win (new boundaries)				

=== Vincent Square ===
Vincent Square (3 seats)
Party	Candidate	Votes	%	±%
Conservative	David Harvey*	1,377	46.3	
Labour	Gillian Arrindell	1,324	44.5	
Conservative	Selina Short*	1,305	43.8	
Conservative	Martin Hayes	1,297	43.6	
Labour	David Parton	1,232	41.4	
Labour	Ananthi Paskaralingam	1,155	38.8	
Liberal Democrats	Francesca Gonshaw	371	12.5	
Liberal Democrats	Phillip Kerle	271	9.1	
Liberal Democrats	Richard Wood	269	9.0	
Turnout		2,977	39.22	
Conservative win (new boundaries)				
Labour win (new boundaries)				
Conservative win (new boundaries)				

=== West End ===
West End (3 seats)
Party	Candidate	Votes	%	±%
Labour	Paul Fisher	1,158	49.3	+6.4
Labour	Jessica Toale	1,111	47.3	+6.9
Labour	Patrick Lilley	1,111	47.3	+6.0
Conservative	Tim Barnes*	961	40.9	−2.3
Conservative	Julie Redmond	923	39.3	−3.2
Conservative	Eoghain Murphy†	913	38.9	+1.0
Liberal Democrats	Sophie Taylor	264	11.2	+3.4
Liberal Democrats	George Coelho	207	8.8	+2.6
Liberal Democrats	Jonah Weisz	158	6.7	+1.2
Turnout		2,349	31.50	+0.4
Labour win (new boundaries)				
Labour win (new boundaries)				
Labour win (new boundaries)				

=== Westbourne ===
Westbourne (3 seats)
Party	Candidate	Votes	%	±%
Labour	David Boothroyd*	1,277	70.7	
Labour	Angela Piddock	1,206	66.7	
Labour	Adam Hug*	1,193	66.0	
Conservative	Jack Berry	341	18.9	
Conservative	Louise Parry	318	17.6	
Conservative	Thomas Davies	300	16.6	
Liberal Democrats	Selina Mills	149	8.2	
No Description	Abby-Jan Dharamsey	124	6.9	
Liberal Democrats	Alastair Coomes	118	6.5	
Liberal Democrats	Joe Wright	84	4.6	
Turnout		1807	24.33	
Labour win (new boundaries)				
Labour win (new boundaries)				
Labour win (new boundaries)				

== 2022–2026 by elections and party changes ==
As well as the by-elections, two councillors have defected from the Conservatives to Reform UK.

=== Abbey Road ===
Abbey Road by-election: 4 July 2024
Party	Candidate	Votes	%	±%
Conservative	Hannah Galley	1,852	43.9	▼1.7
Labour	Alexander Burgess	1,344	31.9	▲2.4
Liberal Democrats	Helen Toeman	560	13.3	▼0.2
Green	Rajiv Rahul	459	10.9	▲0.5
Majority		508	12.0	N/A
Turnout		4,215	52.2	▲20.6
Conservative hold		Swing	▼2.1	

=== Harrow Road ===
Harrow Road by-election, 19 September 2024
Party	Candidate	Votes	%	±%
Labour	Regan Hook	512	44.2	▼28.2
Green	Faaiz Hasan	244	21.1	N/A
Workers Party	Hoz Shafiei	166	14.3	N/A
Conservative	Jonathan Goff	162	14.0	▼3.1
Liberal Democrats	Helen Toeman	63	5.4	▼5.1
Independent	Abby-Jan Dharamsey	11	0.9	N/A
Majority		268	23.1	
Turnout		1,158		
Registered electors				
Labour hold		Swing		

=== West End ===
West End by-election: 19 September 2024
Party	Candidate	Votes	%	±%
Conservative	Tim Barnes	627	48.8	+8.5
Labour	Fiona Parker	489	38.1	–10.5
Green	Rajiv Sinha	94	7.3	N/A
Liberal Democrats	Phillip Kerle	74	5.8	–5.3
Majority		138	10.7	N/A
Turnout		1,284	16.8	–14.7
Conservative gain from Labour		Swing	▲9.5	

=== Vincent Square ===
Vincent Square by-election: 27 February 2025
Party	Candidate	Votes	%	±%
Conservative	Martin Hayes	978	45.4	
Labour	Joanna Camadoo-Rothwell	700	32.5	
Reform	Nick Lockett	206	9.6	
Liberal Democrats	Luis Garcia	156	7.2	
Green	Sanya Mihaylovic	101	4.7	
CPA	Gabriela Fajardo	14	0.7	
Majority		278	12.9	N/A
Turnout		2,155	29.07	−10.2
Conservative gain from Labour		Swing		

== See also ==
- 2022 Queen's Park Community Council election, held the same day
