= St James's (Westminster ward) =

Electoral ward in the City of Westminster, England

- Electoral ward for the Westminster City Council
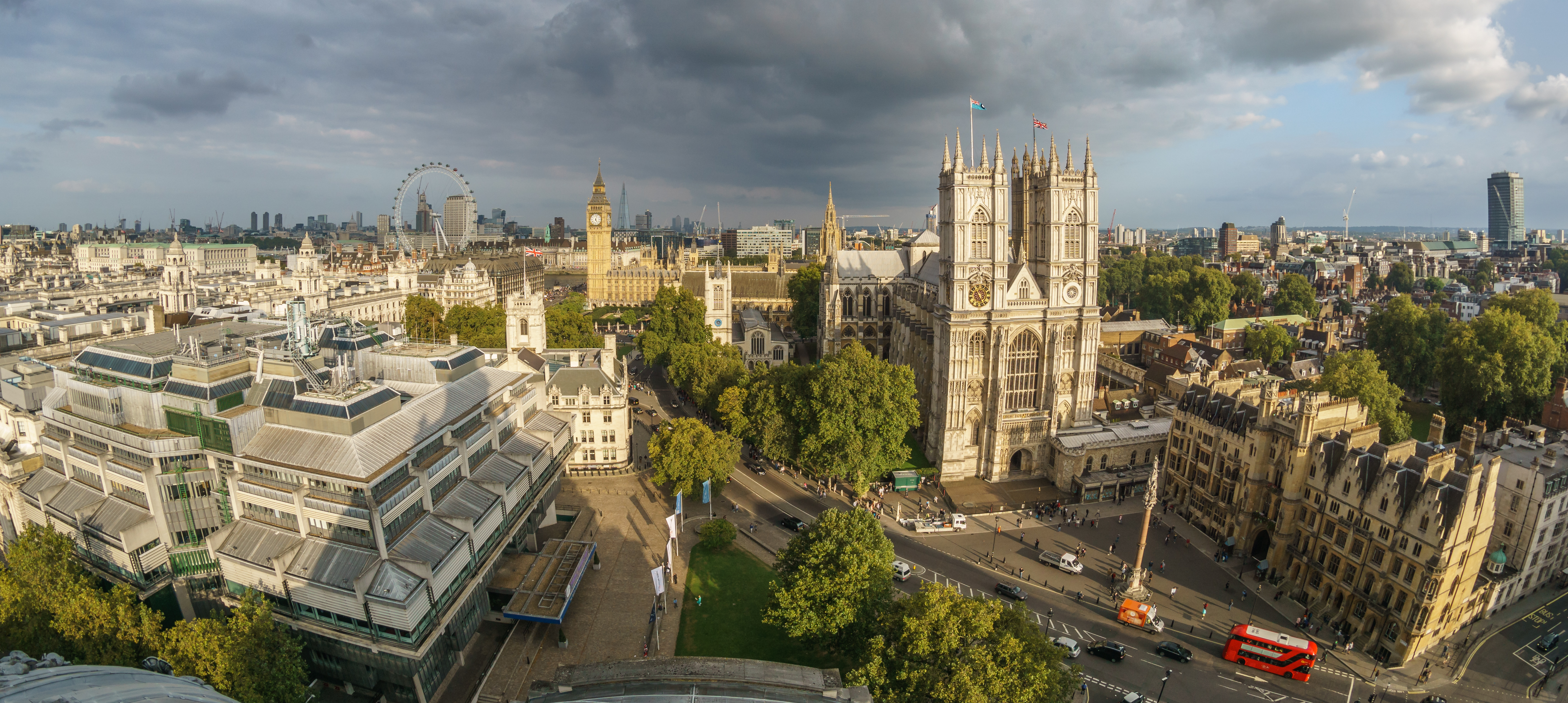
- St James's from Methodist Central Hall
- Borough: Westminster
- County: Greater London
- Population: 11,239 (2024)
- Electorate: 6,943 (2022)
- Area: 3.170 square kilometres (1.224 sq mi)

Current electoral ward
- Created: 1978
- Number of members: 1978–2002: 2; 2002–present: 3
- Councillors: San Abishev; Tim Mitchell; Mark Shearer
- GSS code: E05013806 (2022–present)

St James's is an electoral ward in the City of Westminster. The ward has existed since the 1978 elections and returns three councillors to Westminster City Council. The boundaries of the ward were altered in May 2022.

For elections to Parliament, St James's is part of the Cities of London and Westminster constituency.

== Geography ==
The ward is based on the district of St James's and is located at the centre of Central London. St James's is the largest ward in the city, stretching from Vincent Square to Chancery Lane, and from the river to Piccadilly and Shaftesbury Avenue. The ward contains numerous famous landmarks such as the 10 Downing Street, Palace of Westminster, Parliament Square, Buckingham Palace, Westminster Abbey, Trafalgar Square, St James's Park, Covent Garden and King's College London.

== List of councillors ==
Term	Councillor	Party
1978–1990	Angela Killick	Conservative
1978–1986	Nicholas Thompson	Conservative
1986–1990	Karen Buxton	Conservative
1990–1994	Simon Brocklebank-Fowler	Conservative
1990–1998	Carolyn Keen	Conservative
1994–2010	Alexander Nicoll	Conservative
1998–2026	Louise Hyams	Conservative
2002–present	Tim Mitchell	Conservative
2010–2018	Cameron Thomson	Conservative
2018–present	Mark Shearer	Conservative
2026–present	San Abishev	Conservative

== Westminster council elections since 2022 ==
There was a revision of ward boundaries in Westminster in 2022. Still principally made up of St James's, Victoria, Whitehall, Covent Garden and Strand, the area south of Greatcoat Place and west of Horseferry road became a part of Vincent Square ward.

The population of the ward at the 2021 Census (using 2022 boundaries) was 12,482.

=== 2026 Westminster City Council election ===
The election took place on 7 May 2026.

St James's
Party	Candidate	Votes	%	±%
Conservative	Tim Mitchell *	1,035	44.9	−3.1
Conservative	Mark Shearer *	997	43.3	−4.0
Conservative	San Abishev	974	42.3	−4.4
Labour	Samira Richardson	495	21.5	−17.2
Labour	Hannah Turnbull	484	21.0	−13.3
Labour	Ammar Yusuf	406	17.6	−16.7
Green	Maria Dowell	387	16.8	N/A
Green	Sam Graham	354	15.4	N/A
Green	Mike Walker	324	14.1	N/A
Reform	Samuel Harwood	285	12.4	N/A
Reform	Roger Walters	266	11.6	N/A
Reform	Elke Sweetland	248	10.8	N/A
Liberal Democrats	Moreland Agnew	177	7.7	−6.8
Liberal Democrats	Nigel Stokes	144	6.3	−7.5
Liberal Democrats	Isabelle Pucher	134	5.8	−8.0
Majority		479	20.8	+12.8
Turnout		2,303	33.8	+4.2
Conservative hold				
Conservative hold				
Conservative hold				

=== 2022 Westminster City Council election ===
The election took place on 5 May 2022.

St James's (3)
Party	Candidate	Votes	%	±%
Conservative	Louise Hyams *	979	48.0	−3.7
Conservative	Tim Mitchell *	965	47.3	−4.2
Conservative	Mark Shearer *	954	46.7	−5.8
Labour	Karina Darbin	789	38.7	+6.6
Labour	Paul Raphael James Spence	701	34.3	+3.1
Labour	Nigel Stephen Medforth	700	34.3	+3.7
Liberal Democrats	Michael Anthony Ahearne	295	14.5	+2.5
Liberal Democrats	Paul Diggory	281	13.8	+2.1
Liberal Democrats	Alice Anne Wells	249	13.8	+5.1
Majority		165	8.0	−11.4
Turnout		2,041	29.6	
Conservative win (new boundaries)				
Conservative win (new boundaries)				
Conservative win (new boundaries)				

== Westminster council elections 2002–2022 ==
There was a revision of ward boundaries in Westminster in 2002. The existing wards of the City were abolished and 20 new wards were created. Councillors representing St James's increased from two to three.

=== 2018 Westminster City Council election ===
The election took place on 3 May 2018.

St James's (3)
Party	Candidate	Votes	%	±%
Conservative	Mark Angus Shearer	1,398	52.5	+7.9
Conservative	Louise Ruth Hyams *	1,376	51.7	+3.2
Conservative	Tim Mitchell *	1,373	51.5	+4.3
Labour	Georgina Tracey Newson	854	32.1	+4.5
Labour	Dorothy Nkechinyere Edwin	830	31.2	+6.0
Labour	Zayna Ali	815	30.6	+8.4
Liberal Democrats	Gabrielle Diana Ward-Smith	321	12.0	+1.4
Liberal Democrats	Paul Diggory	311	11.7	+2.1
Green	Sean Charles Ironside	235	8.8	−6.8
Liberal Democrats	Freddie Anderton Joseph Poser	232	8.7	−0.2
Majority		519	19.4	
Turnout		2,873	37.1	+7.5
Conservative hold				
Conservative hold				
Conservative hold				

=== 2014 Westminster City Council election ===
The election took place on 22 May 2014.

St James's (3)
Party	Candidate	Votes	%	±%
Conservative	Louise Ruth Hyams *	1,038	48.5	
Conservative	Timothy Julian Mitchell *	1,011	47.2	
Conservative	Cameron Alexander James Thomson *	955	44.6	
Labour	David Kenneth Lumby	591	27.6	
Labour	Tim Roca	539	25.2	
Labour	Fraser Welsh	475	22.2	
Green	Juliet Dinah Lyle	335	15.6	
UKIP	Silvia Le Marchant	299	14.0	
Liberal Democrats	Steven Dominique Cheung	228	10.6	
Liberal Democrats	Paul Geoffrey David Pettinger	206	9.6	
Liberal Democrats	Paul James Thompson	191	8.9	
Majority		364	17.0	
Turnout			29.6	−19.8
Conservative hold				
Conservative hold				
Conservative hold				

=== 2010 Westminster City Council election ===
The election on 6 May 2010 took place on the same day as the United Kingdom general election.

St James's (3)
Party	Candidate	Votes	%	±%
Conservative	Louise Ruth Hyams *	1,896	45.7	
Conservative	Timothy Julian Mitchell *	1,818		
Conservative	Cameron Alexander James Thomson	1,714		
Liberal Democrats	Rachel Jagger	884	21.3	
Liberal Democrats	Jamie Wood	870		
Labour	Sally Bercow	868	20.9	
Labour	Mair Garside	714		
Labour	Vernon Hunte	690		
Green	Juliet Dinah Lyle	499	12	
Green	Peter Jackson	475		
Green	Benjamin Parker	329		
Majority			24.4	
Turnout			49.4	
Conservative hold				
Conservative hold				
Conservative hold				

=== 2006 Westminster City Council election ===
The election took place on 4 May 2006.

St James's (3)
Party	Candidate	Votes	%	±%
Conservative	Timothy Mitchell *	1,304	64.0	
Conservative	Louise Hyams *	1,290		
Conservative	Alexander Nicoll *	1,216		
Labour	David Cole	372	18.3	
Liberal Democrats	Marie-Louise Rossi	360	17.7	
Labour	Mair Garside	343		
Labour	Owain Garside	335		
Liberal Democrats	David Hughes	307		
Liberal Democrats	John Stevens	305		
Turnout			29.8	
Conservative hold				
Conservative hold				
Conservative hold				

=== 2002 Westminster City Council election ===
The election took place on 2 May 2002.

St James's (3)
Party	Candidate	Votes	%	±%
Conservative	Louise Ruth Hyams *	1,056	58.3	
Conservative	Timothy Julian Mitchell	1,034		
Conservative	Alexander Nicoll *	977		
Labour	Stephanie Ayres	355	19.6	
Labour	Lynda Giddings	343		
Labour	Pamela Eyre	690		
Liberal Democrats	Marie-Louise Rossi	255	14.1	
Liberal Democrats	Nigel Bliss	199		
Green	Peter Budge	144	8.0	
Green	Lydia Howitt	140		
Majority			26.4	
Turnout			38.7	
Conservative win (new boundaries)				
Conservative win (new boundaries)				
Conservative win (new boundaries)				

== Westminster council elections 1978–2002 ==
The ward of St James's was created for the 1978 London borough council elections, returning two councillors. It was part of the City of London and Westminster South UK Parliament constituency. For elections to the Greater London Council it was part of the City of London and Westminster South electoral division until 1986.

=== 1998 Westminster City Council election ===
The election on 7 May 1998 coincided with the 1998 Greater London Authority referendum.

St James's (2)
Party	Candidate	Votes	%	±%
Conservative	Louise R. Hyams	742	64.83	▲7.32
Conservative	Alexander Nicoll *	714		
Labour	David Propert	405	35.17	▲1.86
Labour	James Sheward	385		
Registered electors		3,547		▲287
Turnout		1,189	33.52	▼11.82
Rejected ballots		18	1.51	▲1.31
Conservative hold				
Conservative hold				

=== 1994 Westminster City Council election ===
The election took place on 5 May 1994.

St James's (2)
Party	Candidate	Votes	%	±%
Conservative	Carolyn Keen *	816	57.8	
Conservative	Alexander Nicoll	761		
Labour	Stephen Hilditch	463	32.8	
Labour	Sara Kibel	450		
Liberal Democrats	Guy Halliwell	132	9.4	
Liberal Democrats	Esther Stansfield	120		
Registered electors		3,260		
Turnout			41.1	
Conservative hold				
Conservative hold				

=== 1990 Westminster City Council election ===
The election took place on 3 May 1990.

St James's (2)
Party	Candidate	Votes	%	±%
Conservative	Simon Brocklebank-Fowler	956	58.1	
Conservative	Carolyn Keen	913		
Labour	Arthur Smith	608	36.9	
Labour	Allan Wylie	590		
Liberal Democrats	Nigel Bliss	82	5.0	
Liberal Democrats	Keilh Dugmore	74		
Registered electors		3,344		
Turnout			50.4	
Conservative hold				
Conservative hold				

=== 1986 Westminster City Council election ===
The election took place on 8 May 1986.

St James's (2)
Party	Candidate	Votes	%	±%
Conservative	Angela Killick *	662	50.5	
Conservative	Karen Buxton	631		
Labour	Ruth Bush	501	38.2	
Labour	Simon Timm	450		
Alliance	Nigel Bliss	147	11.2	
Alliance	Richard K.F. Ng	137		
Registered electors		3,981		
Turnout			33.9	
Conservative hold				
Conservative hold				

=== 1982 Westminster City Council election ===
The election took place on 6 May 1982.

St James's (2)
Party	Candidate	Votes	%	±%
Conservative	Angela Killick *	764	58.8	
Conservative	Nicholas Thompson *	727		
Labour	Christopher Holmes	362	37.8	
Labour	Sir Ernest Ashley Bramall	333		
Alliance	Vicki Freeman	174	13.4	
Alliance	Clare Ritzema	154		
Registered electors		4,906		
Turnout			30.9	
Conservative hold				
Conservative hold				

=== 1978 Westminster City Council election ===
The election took place on 4 May 1978.

St James's (2)
Party	Candidate	Votes	%	±%
Conservative	Angela Killick	746	56.2	
Conservative	Nicholas Thompson	741		
Labour	Robert Davies	385	29.0	
Labour	Dorothea Thornton	359		
Independent	Michael Bunney	296	14.8	
Independent	Helen Bunney	184		
Registered electors		4,933		
Turnout			27.2	
Conservative win (new seat)				
Conservative win (new seat)				
