= Pimlico North =

Electoral ward in the City of Westminster, England

- Electoral ward for the Westminster City Council
- Borough: Westminster
- County: Greater London
- Population: 10,317 (2021)

Current electoral ward
- Created: 2022
- Councillors: 3
- GSS code: E05013802 (2022–present)

Pimlico North is an electoral ward in the City of Westminster. The ward was first used in the 2022 elections. It returns three councillors to Westminster City Council.

== Geography ==
The ward is based on the district of Pimlico.

== Councillors ==
Election	Councillors		
2022	Jacqui Wilkinson (Conservative)	Jim Glen (Conservative)	Ed Ford (Conservative)

== Elections ==
=== 2022 Westminster City Council election ===
Pimlico North (3 seats)
Party	Candidate	Votes	%	±%
Conservative	Jacqui Wilkinson†	1,366	49.9	
Conservative	Jim Glen†	1,327	48.4	
Conservative	Ed Pitt Ford	1,263	46.1	
Labour	Paul Derek Heasman	1,024	37.4	
Labour	Sir Peter Heap	1,021	37.3	
Labour	Eric Edward Robinson	881	32.2	
Liberal Democrats	Tony Coleman	478	17.4	
Liberal Democrats	Sophie Alice Louisa Service	382	13.9	
Turnout		2,740	34.91	
Conservative gain from		Swing		
Conservative gain from		Swing		
Conservative gain from		Swing		
