= Pimlico South =

Electoral ward in the City of Westminster, England

- Electoral ward for the Westminster City Council
- Borough: Westminster
- County: Greater London
- Population: 10,692 (2021)

Current electoral ward
- Created: 2022
- Councillors: 3
- GSS code: E05013803 (2022–present)

Pimlico South is an electoral ward in the City of Westminster. The ward was first used in the 2022 elections. It returns three councillors to Westminster City Council.

== Geography ==
The ward is based on the district of Pimlico.

== Councillors ==
Election	Councillors		
2022	Liza Begum (Labour)	Robert Eagleton (Labour)	Jason Williams (Labour)

== Elections ==
=== 2022 Westminster City Council election ===
Pimlico South (3 seats)
Party	Candidate	Votes	%	±%
Labour	Liza Begum	1,516	49.5	
Labour	Robert William Eagleton	1,426	46.6	
Labour	Jason Thomas Williams	1,350	44.1	
Conservative	James Michael Spencer†	1,271	41.5	
Conservative	Murad Gassanly	1,268	41.4	
Conservative	Greg Conary	1,252	40.9	
Liberal Democrats	Daniel John Poole	252	8.2	
Liberal Democrats	Omar Hegazi	216	7.1	
Liberal Democrats	Vikas Aggarwal	207	6.8	
Turnout		3,062	41.16	
Labour hold		Swing		
Labour hold		Swing		
Labour gain from Conservative		Swing		
