= Knightsbridge and Belgravia =

Electoral ward in the City of Westminster, England

- Electoral ward for the Westminster City Council
- Borough: Westminster
- County: Greater London
- Population: 11,028 (2021)

Current electoral ward
- Created: 2002
- Councillors: 3
- GSS code: E05013797 (2022–present)

Knightsbridge and Belgravia is an electoral ward in the City of Westminster. The ward was first used in the 2002 elections. It returns three councillors to Westminster City Council.

== Geography ==
The ward is based on the districts of Knightsbridge and Belgravia.

== Councillors ==
Election	Councillors		
2022	Elizabeth Hitchcock (Conservative)	Rachael Robathan (Conservative)	Tony Devenish (Conservative)

== Elections ==
=== 2022 Westminster City Council election ===
Knightsbridge & Belgravia (3 seats)
Party	Candidate	Votes	%	±%
Conservative	Elizabeth Suzanne Hitchcock*	1,263	62.7	−15.9
Conservative	Rachael Robathan*	1,244	61.8	−15.4
Conservative	Tony Devenish*	1,243	61.7	−17.7
Labour	Simon Robert Horbury	486	24.1	+13.8
Labour	Andrew David Silverman	438	21.8	+11.5
Labour	Guthrie Kerr McKie†	430	21.4	+12.3
Liberal Democrats	Rosamund Durnford-Slater	349	17.3	+6.6
Liberal Democrats	Richard Johnstone Pyatt	280	13.9	+5.4
Turnout		2,013	29.15	−5.35
Conservative hold		Swing		
Conservative hold		Swing		
