= Miles Young =

British businessman

Warden of New College, Oxford
- Preceded by: Curtis Price

Personal details
- Born: June 1954 (age 72) Carlisle, England
- Education: New College, Oxford
- Occupation: Warden of New College, Oxford

Peter Miles Young (born June 1954) is a British former businessman and the incumbent warden of New College, Oxford. Until September 2016, he was worldwide chairman and CEO of the international advertising, marketing, communications, consulting and public relations agency Ogilvy & Mather.

Young's career in advertising has spanned Lintas, Allen Brady & Marsh and Ogilvy & Mather, whom he joined in 1983.

== Early life and business career ==
Young was born in Carlisle and brought up in Bedford, where he was educated at Bedford School. The first member of his family to go to university, he attended New College, Oxford, where he was Steward (a title later renamed President) of the Junior Common Room between 1974 and 1975, and where he gained a congratulatory first class degree in Modern History.

Young went into advertising after Oxford because his family could not afford for him to stay in academia. Working first at Lintas: London, he moved to the Allen, Brady & Marsh agency, later moving to Ogilvy & Mather Advertising in London in 1983, where he joined the board in 1986. There he led the team which won the iconic Guinness account in one of the most publicly followed competitions of the decade.

In 1990, he was appointed as managing director of Ogilvy & Mather Direct in London. Between 1990 and 1995, he was regional director of Ogilvy & Mather Direct Europe. From 1994 to 1995 he was co-located in London and Paris and established the European hub of the recently won $500 million IBM account, which at the time represented the biggest account switch in advertising and direct marketing history. In June 2020, Young was appointed as a non-executive director at S4 Capital. He is also a non-executive board member of CelerateX.

== Local government ==
In 1986, Young was elected to Westminster City Council as a Conservative councillor, representing Victoria ward. On the council he chaired in turn the Information Technology and the Environment Committees.

In the latter role, he was responsible for the first ever tendering out of street cleaning and refuse disposal services to much acclaim, saving money and increasing standards, professionalising the workforce's image while introducing initiatives such as the UK's first ever photometric approach to monitoring litter.

During his time as a councillor, Westminster City Council, under Shirley Porter's leadership, implemented a policy known as Building Stable Communities (BSC). Young was accused by opposition politicians of complicity, but district auditor John Magill cleared him and four other Westminster City Council officers and members of involvement in 1995.

Young became Leader of the council in August 1993, the youngest person ever to hold the position, succeeding Councillor David Weeks. He unravelled Porter's BSC strategy, replacing it with more flexible policies, following advice that there was room for Westminster to meet its statutory obligations to house the homeless and also sell housing to tenants.

Young's tenure as leader was marked by a change in style from his predecessors, with a more hands-off approach and an overarching policy of bringing life back into central London, balancing residential and business needs. He created the first ever tourism strategy for the City of Westminster, pushed a plan for removing prostitute calling cards, and co-sponsored the London First Centre, a body tasked with attracting inward investment to London and credited with staving off the rival claims of Frankfurt as a financial centre.

Young's tenure as leader ended in June 1995, and he stood down from the council in 1998. He has no current political affiliations.

== Asia ==
In 1995, Young was appointed chairman of Asia Pacific at Ogilvy & Mather Worldwide, a position he held for 13 years, while also representing WPP's corporate interests in Asia as Chairman of WPP Asia, in addition to his Ogilvy & Mather responsibilities. During this time, he oversaw the expansion of the Ogilvy & Mather network, doubling the region's revenue to $500 million between 2003 and 2008, and supervised building operations in India, Vietnam, Indonesia, Korea, Japan, Thailand and Pakistan, while also expanding practice disciplines.

From 1997, Young managed Ogilvy & Mather's expansion into China, including the opening of its public relations arm. In 1999, Ogilvy Interactive was established in Beijing, with IBM as its first client.

== Worldwide ==
In 2008, the then-WPP CEO Sir Martin Sorrell appointed Young as CEO of Ogilvy Worldwide. He became Chairman of the Group, succeeding his long-time mentor, Shelley Lazarus.

Young was widely credited with repositioning Ogilvy from a legacy business "imbued with a kind of insular elitism reflecting one of the bluest of advertising's blue-chip clubs".

Young's strategy introduced a focus on overseas growth in so-called BRICS (Brazil, Russia, India, China & South Africa) markets and also the N-11 – the Next Eleven emerging markets – such as Vietnam, Indonesia and Turkey.

He is credited with coining the term the "third one billion" in reference to the world's "largely-untapped" 1.8 billion Muslim consumers and set up the world's first bespoke Islamic branding practice, Ogilvy Noor.

During Young's tenure, he oversaw an overhaul of the Ogilvy graduate scheme, championing diverse young talent while diminishing a culture of expatriate management in Ogilvy's overseas agencies.

He was one of the first large agency CEOs to embrace the challenge of the digital revolution, putting it at the centre of Ogilvy's operations and articulating a belief in digital as something which transcends traditional communications disciplines. He was a strong advocate of large networks being able to leverage their strength to provide superior product to the small shops.

Having served as a member of the board of directors, in 2012, Young was elected chairman of the US–Pakistan Business Council in Washington, D.C., in recognition of his expertise and guidance in advancing the council's policy agenda in strengthening US–Pakistan relations.

Young retired as chairman of the board and a director of Ogilvy & Mather in 2016.

Before departing Ogilvy, Young authored Ogilvy on Advertising in the Digital Age, described by industry blog More About Advertising as "an exhaustingly researched and masterfully written guide to how we got where we are now, and where we might possibly be going in the future". Publishers Weekly said of the book: “Ogilvy would be proud, with Young achieving his stated goal of convincing a new generation to look back at Ogilvy’s classic work, while also adding his own canny take on the contemporary advertising game.” (2017)

== Higher education ==
Young was elected 48th warden of his alma mater, New College, Oxford, in September 2016, succeeding Sir Curtis Price. He is the first person from the world of business to hold the role and the first ‘classic’ businessman to head an Oxford College.

Within the university, he is a current chair of Voltaire Foundation and a former chair of Disability Sub-Group, a former chair of the Development Panel of the Conference of Colleges and of the Committee to Review Donations of the university.

Young is overseeing the construction of New College's £36m new campus, the Gradel Quadrangles, which includes additional student accommodation, student study space, a 100-seat music hall and facilities for the adjacent New College School, plus a 21.8 m tower and gatehouse.

In 2019, he was elected chair of the Conference of Colleges, succeeding Sir Rick Trainor, the rector of Exeter College, and helped guide the university in a collaborative way through the pandemic. His two-year period of office ended in September 2022, following which he became chair of the governance forum of the conference, looking at how Oxford College Governance could evolve.

== Personal life ==
In 1989, he purchased a cinnamon estate in Sri Lanka, restoring it to working order and persuading renowned Sri Lankan architect Anjalendran to remodel it, design a museum and visitor centre, staff quarters and workshops as well as a bungalow complex recognised as one of the leading examples of contemporary Sri Lankan architecture. Young and Anjalendran own the largest and most representational private collection of contemporary Sri Lankan art and sculpture.

Young sponsors the annual Geoffrey Bawa Award for architecture in Sri Lanka, a tribute to the late architect which aims to "encourage good new architecture of whatever complexion".
