= 1978 Westminster City Council election =

1978 local election in England

- 4 May 1978

All 60 council seats of the Westminster City Council 31 seats needed for a majority
Council control before election
Conservative
Subsequent council control
Conservative

The 1978 Westminster Council election took place on 4 May 1978 to elect members of Westminster City Council in London, England. The whole council was up for election and the Conservative party stayed in overall control of the council.

== Election result ==
1978 Westminster City Council Election
| Party | Seats | Gains | Losses | Net gain/loss | Seats % | Votes % | Votes | +/− |
|---|---|---|---|---|---|---|---|---|
| Conservative | 39 | | | | 65.0 | 55.7 | | |
| Labour | 19 | | | | 31.7 | 37.9 | | |
| Other | 2 | | | | 3.3 | 5.1 | | |
| Liberal | 0 | | | | 0.0 | 1.3 | | |
| Total | 60 | | | | | | 140,552 | |

== Ward results ==
=== Baker Street ===
Baker Street (2)
| Party | Candidate | Votes | % | ±% |

=== Bayswater ===
Bayswater (3)
| Party | Candidate | Votes | % | ±% |

=== Belgrave ===
Belgrave (2)
| Party | Candidate | Votes | % | ±% |

=== Bryanston ===
Bryanston (2)
| Party | Candidate | Votes | % | ±% |

=== Cavendish ===
Cavendish (3)
| Party | Candidate | Votes | % | ±% |

=== Church Street ===
Church Street (3)
| Party | Candidate | Votes | % | ±% |

=== Churchill ===
Churchill (3)
| Party | Candidate | Votes | % | ±% |

=== Hamilton Terrace ===
Hamilton Terrace (2)
| Party | Candidate | Votes | % | ±% |

=== Harrow Road ===
Harrow Road (3)
| Party | Candidate | Votes | % | ±% |

=== Hyde Park ===
Hyde Park (3)
| Party | Candidate | Votes | % | ±% |

=== Knightsbridge ===
Knightsbridge (2)
| Party | Candidate | Votes | % | ±% |

=== Lancaster Gate ===
Lancaster Gate (3)
| Party | Candidate | Votes | % | ±% |

=== Little Venice ===
Little Venice (3)
| Party | Candidate | Votes | % | ±% |

=== Lord's ===
Lord's (2)
| Party | Candidate | Votes | % | ±% |

=== Maida Vale ===
Maida Vale (3)
| Party | Candidate | Votes | % | ±% |

=== Millbank ===
Millbank (3)
| Party | Candidate | Votes | % | ±% |

=== Queen's Park ===
Queen's Park (3)
| Party | Candidate | Votes | % | ±% |

=== Regent's Park ===
Regent's Park (3)
| Party | Candidate | Votes | % | ±% |

=== St George's ===
St George's (3)
| Party | Candidate | Votes | % | ±% |

=== St James's ===
St James's (2)
| Party | Candidate | Votes | % | ±% |
|---|---|---|---|---|
| Conservative | Angela Killick | 746 | 56.2 | |
| Conservative | Nicholas Thompson | 741 | | |
| Labour | Robert Davies | 385 | 29.0 | |
| Labour | Dorothea Thornton | 359 | | |
| Independent | Michael Bunney | 296 | 14.8 | |
| Independent | Helen Bunney | 184 | | |
| Registered electors | | 4,933 | | |
| Turnout | | | 27.2 | |
| Conservative hold | | | | |
| Conservative hold | | | | |

=== Victoria ===
Victoria (2)
| Party | Candidate | Votes | % | ±% |

=== West End ===
West End (2)
| Party | Candidate | Votes | % | ±% |

=== Westbourne ===
Westbourne (3)
| Party | Candidate | Votes | % | ±% |
