= 1968 Westminster City Council election =

1968 local election in England

← 1964	9 May 1968	1971 →

All 60 council seats of the Westminster City Council 31 seats needed for a majority
Council control before election
Conservative
Subsequent council control
Conservative

The 1968 Westminster Council election took place on 9 May 1968 to elect members of Westminster City Council in London, England. The whole council was up for election and the Conservative party stayed in overall control of the council.

== Ward results ==
=== Baker Street ===
Baker Street (5)
Party	Candidate	Votes	%	±%
Conservative				
Conservative				
Conservative				
Conservative				
Conservative				
Labour				
Labour				
Labour				
Labour				
Labour				
Communist				
Turnout				
Conservative hold		Swing		
Conservative hold		Swing		
Conservative hold		Swing		
Conservative hold		Swing		
Conservative hold		Swing		

=== Cavendish ===
Cavendish (3)
Party	Candidate	Votes	%	±%
Conservative				
Conservative				
Conservative				
Labour				
Labour				
Labour				
Communist				
Turnout				
Conservative hold		Swing		
Conservative hold		Swing		
Conservative hold		Swing		

=== Charing Cross ===
Charing Cross (2)
Party	Candidate	Votes	%	±%
Conservative				
Conservative				
Labour				
Labour				
Turnout				
Conservative win (new seat)				
Conservative win (new seat)				

=== Churchill ===
Churchill (3)
Party	Candidate	Votes	%	±%
Conservative				
Conservative				
Conservative				
Labour				
Labour				
Labour				
Liberal				
Liberal				
Liberal				
Independent				
Turnout				
Conservative gain from Labour		Swing		
Conservative win (new seat)				
Conservative win (new seat)				

=== Church Street ===
Church Street (3)
Party	Candidate	Votes	%	±%
Labour				
Labour				
Labour				
Conservative				
Conservative				
Conservative				
Communist				
Turnout				
Labour hold		Swing		
Labour hold		Swing		
Labour hold		Swing		

=== Harrow Road ===
Harrow Road (5)
Party	Candidate	Votes	%	±%
Conservative				
Conservative				
Conservative				
Conservative				
Conservative				
Labour				
Labour				
Labour				
Labour				
Labour				
Communist				
Turnout				
Conservative gain from Labour		Swing		
Conservative gain from Labour		Swing		
Conservative gain from Labour		Swing		
Conservative gain from Labour		Swing		
Conservative gain from Labour		Swing		

=== Hyde Park ===
Hyde Park (5)
Party	Candidate	Votes	%	±%
Conservative				
Conservative				
Conservative				
Conservative				
Conservative				
Liberal				
Labour				
Labour				
Labour				
Labour				
Liberal				
Labour				
Liberal				
Liberal				
Liberal				
Turnout				
Conservative hold		Swing		
Conservative hold		Swing		
Conservative hold		Swing		
Conservative hold		Swing		
Conservative hold		Swing		

=== Knightsbridge ===
Knightsbridge (3)
Party	Candidate	Votes	%	±%
Conservative				
Conservative				
Conservative				
Labour				
Labour				
Labour				
Turnout				
Conservative hold		Swing		
Conservative win (new seat)				
Conservative win (new seat)				

=== Lancaster Gate ===
Lancaster Gate (3)
Party	Candidate	Votes	%	±%
Conservative				
Conservative				
Conservative				
Labour				
Liberal				
Labour				
Labour				
Liberal				
Liberal				
Turnout				
Conservative hold		Swing		
Conservative hold		Swing		
Conservative hold		Swing		

=== Lords ===
Lords (3)
Party	Candidate	Votes	%	±%
Conservative				
Conservative				
Conservative				
Labour				
Labour				
Labour				
Turnout				
Conservative hold		Swing		
Conservative hold		Swing		
Conservative hold		Swing		

=== Maida Vale ===
Maida Vale (5)
Party	Candidate	Votes	%	±%
Conservative				
Conservative				
Conservative				
Conservative				
Conservative				
Labour				
Labour				
Labour				
Labour				
Labour				
Turnout				
Conservative hold		Swing		
Conservative hold		Swing		
Conservative hold		Swing		
Conservative hold		Swing		
Conservative hold		Swing		

=== Millbank ===
Millbank (2)
Party	Candidate	Votes	%	±%
Conservative				
Conservative				
Labour				
Labour				
Communist				
Turnout				
Conservative gain from Labour		Swing		
Conservative win (new seat)				

=== Queen's Park ===
Queen's Park (2)
Party	Candidate	Votes	%	±%
Labour				
Labour				
Conservative				
Conservative				
Turnout				
Labour hold		Swing		
Labour hold		Swing		

=== Regent Street ===
Regent Street (4)
Party	Candidate	Votes	%	±%
Conservative				
Conservative				
Conservative				
Conservative				
Labour				
Labour				
Labour				
Labour				
Turnout				
Conservative hold		Swing		
Conservative win (new seat)				
Conservative win (new seat)				
Conservative win (new seat)				

=== Regent's Park ===
Regent's Park (3)
Party	Candidate	Votes	%	±%
Conservative				
Conservative				
Conservative				
Labour				
Labour				
Labour				
Communist				
Turnout				
Conservative hold		Swing		
Conservative hold		Swing		
Conservative hold		Swing		

=== Victoria Street ===
Victoria Street (3)
Party	Candidate	Votes	%	±%
Conservative				
Conservative				
Conservative				
Labour				
Labour				
Labour				
Turnout				
Conservative win (new seat)				
Conservative win (new seat)				
Conservative win (new seat)				

=== Warwick ===
Warwick (3)
Party	Candidate	Votes	%	±%
Conservative				
Conservative				
Conservative				
Labour				
Labour				
Labour				
Turnout				
Conservative hold		Swing		
Conservative win (new seat)				
Conservative win (new seat)				

=== Westbourne ===
Westbourne (3)
Party	Candidate	Votes	%	±%
Conservative				
Conservative				
Conservative				
Labour				
Labour				
Labour				
Liberal				
Liberal				
Liberal				
Communist				
Turnout				
Conservative gain from Labour		Swing		
Conservative gain from Labour		Swing		
Conservative gain from Labour		Swing		
