= Vincent Square (ward) =

Electoral ward in the City of Westminster, England

- Electoral ward for the Westminster City Council
- Vincent Square ward boundaries since 2022
- Borough: Westminster
- County: Greater London
- Population: 10,327 (2021) (Note: 2021 Census data reported for 2022 ward boundaries)
- Electorate: 7,637 (2022)
- Major settlements: Millbank
- Area: 0.6047 square kilometres (0.2335 sq mi)

Current electoral ward
- Created: 2002
- Number of members: 3
- Councillors: David Harvey; Ben Sewell; Selina Short
- ONS code: 00BKGS
- GSS code: E05000646 (2002–2022); E05013807 (2022–present)

Vincent Square is an electoral ward in the City of Westminster. The ward was first used in the 2002 elections. It returns three councillors to Westminster City Council. The boundaries of the ward were revised in 2022.

== List of councillors ==
Term	Councillor	Party
2002–2010	Duncan Sandys	Conservative
2002–2022	Danny Chalkley	Conservative
2002–2006	Justin Powell-Tuck	Conservative
2006–2018	Steve Summers	Conservative
2010–present	David Harvey	Conservative
2018–present	Selina Short	Conservative
2022–2024	Gillian Arrindell	Labour
2025–2026	Martin Hayes	Conservative
2026–present	Ben Sewell	Conservative

== Summary ==
Councillors elected by party at each general borough election.

- Conservative
- Labour

== Westminster council elections since 2022 ==
There was a revision of ward boundaries in Westminster in 2022.

=== 2025 by-election ===
The by-election took place on 27 February 2025, following the death of Gillian Arrindell.

2025 Vincent Square by-election
Party	Candidate	Votes	%	±%
Conservative	Martin Hayes	977	45.4%	+0.5%
Labour	Joanna Camadoo-Rothwell	700	32.5%	−10.6%
Reform	Nick Lockett	206	9.6%	N/A
Liberal Democrats	Luis Garcia	156	7.2%	−4.8%
Green	Sanya Mihaylovic	101	4.7%	N/A
CPA	Gabriela Fajardo	14	0.6	N/A
Turnout				
Conservative gain from Labour		Swing		

=== 2022 election ===
The election took place on 5 May 2022.

2022 Westminster City Council election: Vincent Square
Party	Candidate	Votes	%	±%
Conservative	David Harvey	1,377	46.3	
Labour	Gillian Arrindell	1,324	44.5	
Conservative	Selina Short	1,305	43.8	
Conservative	Martin Hayes	1,297	43.6	
Labour	David Parton	1,232	41.4	
Labour	Ananthi Paskaralingam	1,155	38.8	
Liberal Democrats	Francesca Gonshaw	371	12.5	
Liberal Democrats	Phillip Kerle	271	9.1	
Liberal Democrats	Richard Wood	269	9.0	
Turnout		2,977	39.22	
Conservative win (new boundaries)				
Labour win (new boundaries)				
Conservative win (new boundaries)				

== 2002–2022 Westminster council elections ==
Vincent Square ward boundaries from 2002 to 2022

=== 2018 election ===
The election took place on 3 May 2018.

2018 Westminster City Council election: Vincent Square
Party	Candidate	Votes	%	±%
Conservative	David Harvey	1,679	50.9	−1.2
Conservative	Danny Chalkley	1,594	48.3	−1.5
Conservative	Selina Short	1,579	47.9	−0.1
Labour	Justin Jones	1,263	38.3	+8.2
Labour	Henry Tufnell	1,155	35.0	+6.1
Labour	Ananthi Paskaralingam	1,148	34.8	+8.6
Green	Stephanie Landymore	326	9.9	−7.2
Liberal Democrats	Andrew Rogers	271	8.2	N/A
Liberal Democrats	James Morgan	265	8.0	N/A
Liberal Democrats	Russell Kirk	247	7.5	N/A
Majority		316	9.6	
Turnout		9527	45.4	+8.9
Conservative hold		Swing		
Conservative hold		Swing		
Conservative hold		Swing		

=== 2014 election ===
The election took place on 22 May 2014.

2014 Westminster City Council election: Vincent Square
Party	Candidate	Votes	%	±%
Conservative	David Harvey	1,364	52.1	
Conservative	Danny Chalkley	1,305	49.8	
Conservative	Steve Summers	1,256	48.0	
Labour	Sarah Macri	789	30.1	
Labour	Sir Peter Heap	758	28.9	
Labour	Alen Mathewson	686	26.2	
Green	Katherine Harrison	448	17.1	
UKIP	Peter Benmax	327	12.5	
Independent	Wilfried Rimensberger	279	10.7	
Majority		467	17.9	
Turnout		7212	36.5	−19.2
Conservative hold		Swing		
Conservative hold		Swing		
Conservative hold		Swing		

=== 2010 election ===
The election on 6 May 2010 took place on the same day as the United Kingdom general election.

2010 Westminster City Council election: Vincent Square
Party	Candidate	Votes	%	±%
Conservative	David Harvey	2,131		
Conservative	Danny Chalkley	2,095		
Conservative	Steve Summers	2,021		
Liberal Democrats	Julie Porksen	948		
Liberal Democrats	Lindy Foord	926		
Labour	Tina Davy	873		
Labour	Peter Heap	809		
Labour	Alen Mathewson	802		
Liberal Democrats	Sandra Rapacioli	750		
Majority				
Turnout				
Conservative hold		Swing		
Conservative hold		Swing		
Conservative hold		Swing		

=== 2006 election ===
The election took place on 4 May 2006.

2006 Westminster City Council election: Vincent Square
Party	Candidate	Votes	%	±%
Conservative	Duncan Sandys	1,596	64.7	
Conservative	Steve Summers	1,563		
Conservative	Danny Chalkley	1,544		
Labour	Gillian Guy	457	18.5	
Labour	Peter Heap	422		
Liberal Democrats	Margaret Lang	415	16.8	
Labour	Alen Mathewson	411		
Liberal Democrats	Janice Taverne	355		
Liberal Democrats	Kathleen Hobbins	354		
Turnout			35.2	
Conservative hold		Swing		
Conservative hold		Swing		
Conservative hold		Swing		

=== 2002 election ===
The election took place on 2 May 2002.

2002 Westminster City Council election: Vincent Square
Party	Candidate	Votes	%	±%
Conservative	Duncan Sandys	1,351		
Conservative	Danny Chalkley	1,308		
Conservative	Justin Powell-Tuck	1,270		
Labour	Steven Friel	406		
Labour	Gillian Guy	391		
Labour	Alen Mathewson	357		
Liberal Democrats	Margaret Lang	264		
Liberal Democrats	Janice Taverne	230		
Liberal Democrats	Kathleen Hobbins	223		
Turnout				
Conservative win (new seat)				
Conservative win (new seat)				
Conservative win (new seat)				
