= 1982 Westminster City Council election =

Local election in England

- 6 May 1982

All 60 council seats of the Westminster City Council 31 seats needed for a majority
Council control before election
Conservative
Subsequent council control
Conservative

The 1982 Westminster City Council election took place on 6 May 1982 to elect members of Westminster City Council in London, England. The whole council was up for election and the Conservative Party stayed in overall control of the council.

== Election result ==
The Conservatives won 43 seats, Labour (including Labour Co-op) won 16 seats and an Independent won one seat.

== Ward results ==
=== Baker Street ===
Baker Street (2)
Party	Candidate	Votes	%	±%

=== Bayswater ===
Bayswater (3)
Party	Candidate	Votes	%	±%

=== Belgrave ===
Belgrave (2)
Party	Candidate	Votes	%	±%

=== Bryanston ===
Bryanston (2)
Party	Candidate	Votes	%	±%

=== Cavendish ===
Cavendish (3)
Party	Candidate	Votes	%	±%

=== Church Street ===
Church Street (3)
Party	Candidate	Votes	%	±%

=== Churchill ===
Churchill (3)
Party	Candidate	Votes	%	±%

=== Hamilton Terrace ===
Hamilton Terrace (2)
Party	Candidate	Votes	%	±%

=== Harrow Road ===
Harrow Road (3)
Party	Candidate	Votes	%	±%

=== Hyde Park ===
Hyde Park (3)
Party	Candidate	Votes	%	±%

=== Knightsbridge ===
Knightsbridge (2)
Party	Candidate	Votes	%	±%

=== Lancaster Gate ===
Lancaster Gate (3)
Party	Candidate	Votes	%	±%

=== Little Venice ===
Little Venice (3)
Party	Candidate	Votes	%	±%

=== Lord's ===
Lord's (2)
Party	Candidate	Votes	%	±%

=== Maida Vale ===
Maida Vale (3)
Party	Candidate	Votes	%	±%

=== Millbank ===
Millbank (3)
Party	Candidate	Votes	%	±%

=== Queen's Park ===
Queen's Park (3)
Party	Candidate	Votes	%	±%

=== Regent's Park ===
Regent's Park (3)
Party	Candidate	Votes	%	±%

=== St George's ===
St George's (3)
Party	Candidate	Votes	%	±%

=== St James's ===
St James's (2)
Party	Candidate	Votes	%	±%
Conservative	Angela Killick	764	58.8	
Conservative	Nicholas Thompson	727		
Labour	Christopher Holmes	362	37.8	
Labour	Sir Ernest Ashley Bramall	333		
Alliance	Vicki Freeman	174	13.4	
Alliance	Clare Ritzema	154		
Registered electors		4,906		
Turnout			30.9	
Conservative hold				
Conservative hold				

=== Victoria ===
Victoria (2)
Party	Candidate	Votes	%	±%

=== West End ===
West End (2)
Party	Candidate	Votes	%	±%

=== Westbourne ===
Westbourne (3)
Party	Candidate	Votes	%	±%
