= Lancaster Gate (ward) =

Electoral ward in the City of Westminster, England

- Electoral ward for the Westminster City Council
- Lancaster Gate ward boundaries since 2022
- Borough: Westminster
- County: Greater London
- Population: 10,951 (2021) (Note: 2021 Census data reported for 2022 ward boundaries)
- Electorate: 7,069 (2022)
- Area: 0.6136 square kilometres (0.2369 sq mi)

Current electoral ward
- Created: 1965
- Number of members: 3
- Councillors: Ellie Ormsby; Connor Jones; Philip Stephenson-Oliver
- ONS code: 00BKGJ
- GSS code: E05000638 (2002–2022); E05013798 (2022–present)

Lancaster Gate is an electoral ward in the City of Westminster.

== Westminster council elections since 2022 ==
There was a revision of ward boundaries in Westminster in 2022.

=== 2022 election ===
The election took place on 5 May 2022.

2022 Westminster City Council election: Lancaster Gate (3)
Party	Candidate	Votes	%	±%
Conservative	Laila Dupuy	1,110	44.1	−2.8
Labour	Ellie Ormsby	1,057	42.0	+4.8
Labour	Ryan Jude	1,053	41.8	+5.5
Conservative	Margot Bright	1,051	41.8	−4.4
Labour	Dario Goodwin	1,031	41.0	+9.0
Conservative	Philip Stephenson-Oliver	980	38.9	−7.2
Liberal Democrats	Sue Baring	319	12.7	−4.4
Green	Kathy Hughes	303	12.0	N/A
Liberal Democrats	Benjamin Hurdis	182	7.2	−6.9
Liberal Democrats	Thierry Serero	159	6.3	−5.7
Turnout		2,517	35.76	−2.34
Conservative win (new boundaries)				
Labour win (new boundaries)				
Labour win (new boundaries)				

== 2002–2022 Westminster council elections ==
Lancaster Gate ward boundaries from 2002 to 2022

There was a revision of ward boundaries in Westminster in 2002.

=== 2018 election ===
The election took place on 3 May 2018.

2018 Westminster City Council election: Lancaster Gate (3)
Party	Candidate	Votes	%	±%
Conservative	Susie Burbridge	1,318	49.6	−9.0
Conservative	Robert Davis	1,226	46.2	−7.3
Conservative	Andrew Smith	1,223	46.1	−5.1
Labour	Angela Piddock	992	37.2	+14.2
Labour	Liz Whitmore	967	36.3	+13.1
Labour	Simon Wyatt	852	32.0	+8.4
Liberal Democrats	Sue Baring	456	17.1	+2.5
Liberal Democrats	Sally Gray	376	14.1	N/A
Liberal Democrats	Nathalie Ubilava	321	12.0	N/A
Majority		231	8.9	
Turnout		7731	38.1	+9.1
Conservative hold		Swing		
Conservative hold		Swing		
Conservative hold		Swing		

=== 2014 election ===
The election took place on 22 May 2014.

2014 Westminster City Council election: Lancaster Gate (3)
Party	Candidate	Votes	%	±%
Conservative	Susie Burbridge	1,262	58.6	+10.6
Conservative	Robert Davis	1,152	53.5	+6.2
Conservative	Andrew Smith	1,104	51.2	+8.6
Labour	Dafydd Elis	509	23.6	+4.4
Labour	Liz Whitmore	500	23.2	+4.3
Labour	Angela Piddock	496	23.0	+4.4
Green	Nicholas Figgis	340	15.8	+4.7
Liberal Democrats	Sue Baring	314	14.6	−8.1
Liberal Democrats	Thoby Kennet	229	10.6	−7.9
Majority		595	27.6	
Turnout		5906	29.9	−20.8
Conservative hold		Swing		
Conservative hold		Swing		
Conservative hold		Swing		

=== 2010 election ===
The election on 6 May 2010 took place on the same day as the United Kingdom general election.

=== 2006 election ===
The election took place on 4 May 2006.

=== 2002 election ===
The election took place on 2 May 2002.
