= Bayswater (ward) =

Electoral ward in the City of Westminster, England

- Electoral ward for the Westminster City Council
- Borough: Westminster
- County: Greater London
- Population: 12,366 (2021)

Current electoral ward
- Created: 1978
- Councillors: 3
- GSS code: E05013793 (2022–present)

Bayswater is an electoral ward in the City of Westminster. The ward was first used in the 1978 elections. It returns three councillors to Westminster City Council.

== Geography ==
The ward is based on the district of Bayswater.

== Councillors ==
Election	Councillors		
2022	Maggie Carman (Labour)	Max Sullivan (Labour)	James Small-Edwards (Labour)

== Elections ==
=== 2022 Westminster City Council election ===
Bayswater (3 seats)
Party	Candidate	Votes	%	±%
Labour	Maggie Carman*	1,618	60.1	+20.5
Labour	Max Sullivan	1,481	55.0	+19.3
Labour	James Small-Edwards	1,476	54.8	+21.7
Conservative	Anna Askew	910	33.8	−5.6
Conservative	Iain James Bott†	875	32.5	−6.9
Conservative	Henry Graham Cornelius Shelford	792	29.4	−7.1
Liberal Democrats	Scott Andrew Caizley	276	10.3	−10.4
Liberal Democrats	Jane Caroline Grantham Smithard	266	9.9	−9.9
Liberal Democrats	Nathalie Ubilava	219	8.1	−9.4
Turnout		2,692	33.80	−5.9
Labour win (new boundaries)				
Labour win (new boundaries)				
Labour win (new boundaries)				
