= Church Street (Westminster ward) =

Electoral ward in the City of Westminster

Coordinates: 51.524°N 0.169°W

- Electoral ward for the Westminster City Council
- Church Street ward boundaries since 2022
- Borough: Westminster
- County: Greater London

Current electoral ward
- Created: 1965
- Councillors: Aicha Less; Matt Noble; Aziz Toki
- GSS code: E05013794 (2022–present)

Church Street is an electoral ward of the City of Westminster. The population at the 2011 Census was 11,760. The ward covers the eponymous street market and the surrounding area of Lisson Grove, to the north of the Edgware Road. The area is currently the focus of regeneration plans by the council.

The ward returns three councillors to Westminster City Council, with an election every four years. At the last election in May 2022, Matt Noble, Aicha Less and Abdul Toki, all candidates from the Labour Party, were elected to represent the ward.

Since the ward was created for the formation of the council in 1965, it has usually elected Labour councillors, with most results indicating a safe seat for the party. The sole occasion another party represented the ward was following the by-election of 24 July 2008, when a seat was won by a Conservative candidate for the first and only time to date, beating Labour's candidate Dave Rowntree, the drummer from the band Blur. The seat was regained by Labour at the subsequent council election in May 2010, held on the same day as the general election.

Previous councillors elected for the area include the Dowager Countess of Lucan, barrister and current QC Gavin Millar, and subsequent London Assembly AM Murad Qureshi.

== Westminster council elections since 2022 ==
There was a revision of ward boundaries in Westminster in 2022. Like the other wards of Westminster, Church Street is represented by three councillors on Westminster City Council. The last election was held on 5 May 2022, when all three councillors were elected. All three currently represent the Labour Party.

=== 2022 election ===
The election took place on 5 May 2022.

2022 Westminster City Council election: Church Street (3)
Party	Candidate	Votes	%	±%
Labour	Aicha Less	1,303	70.6	
Labour	Matt Noble	1,249	67.7	
Labour	Aziz Toki	1,219	66.1	
Conservative	Blessings Kaseke	347	18.8	
Conservative	Amarjeet Singh Johal	318	17.2	
Conservative	Jaime Law	308	16.7	
Liberal Democrats	William Dunbar	143	7.8	
Liberal Democrats	Rachael Georgina Jagger	142	7.7	
Liberal Democrats	Patrick Ryan	139	7.5	
Turnout		1,845	25.85	
Labour win (new boundaries)				
Labour win (new boundaries)				
Labour win (new boundaries)				

== 2002–2022 Westminster council elections ==
There was a revision of ward boundaries in Wetminster in 2002.

=== 2018 election ===
The election took place on 3 May 2018.

2018 Westminster City Council election: Church Street (3)
Party	Candidate	Votes	%	±%
Labour	Aicha Less	1,796	73.5	+5.1
Labour	Aziz Toki	1,739	71.1	+12.0
Labour	Matt Noble	1,727	70.6	+11.7
Conservative	Margot Joan Bright	418	17.1	−1.2
Conservative	Adam Dean	381	15.6	−0.9
Conservative	Rachid Boufas	358	14.6	−2.0
Green	David James Blyth	176	7.2	−6.2
Liberal Democrats	Mathieu Charles Emile Primot	121	4.9	N/A
Liberal Democrats	Rachel Georgina Jagger	120	4.9	N/A
Liberal Democrats	Andrew Paul Shaylor	84	3.4	N/A
Majority		1309	53.5	
Turnout		6920	33.5	−1.3
Labour hold		Swing		
Labour hold		Swing		
Labour hold		Swing		

Results are compared with the 2014 council election, not the 2016 by-election.

=== 2016 by-election ===
The by-election was held on 5 May 2016 following the resignation of Vincenzo Rampulla.

2016 Church Street by-election
Party	Candidate	Votes	%	±%
Labour	Aicha Less	2,174	70.3	+3.2
Conservative	Rachid Boufas	512	16.6	−1.9
Liberal Democrats	Alistair Graeme Barr	205	6.6	+6.6
UKIP	Jill Sarah De Quincey	175	5.7	+5.7
Pirate	Andreas Habeland	26	0.8	+0.8
Majority		1,662	53.7	+5.1
Turnout		3,151	45	+10.2
Labour hold		Swing		

=== 2014 election ===
The election took place on 22 May 2014.

2014 Westminster City Council election: Church Street
Party	Candidate	Votes	%	±%
Labour	Barbara Grahame	1,854	68.4	
Labour	Aziz Toki	1,602	59.1	
Labour	Vincenzo Rampulla	1,597	58.9	
Conservative	Isobel Bradley	495	18.3	
Conservative	Rachid Boufas	449	16.6	
Conservative	Lauren Hankinson	448	16.5	
Green	Marta Helena Enflo	362	13.4	
Majority		1102	40.6	
Turnout		6807	34.8	−15.0
Labour hold		Swing		
Labour hold		Swing		
Labour hold		Swing		

=== 2008 by-election ===
A by-election was held on 24 July 2008, following the death of Antony Mothersdale.

2008 Church Street by-election
Party	Candidate	Votes	%	±%
Conservative	Mehfuz Ahmed	955	53.6	+24.5
Labour	Dave Rowntree	652	36.6	−3.0
Liberal Democrats	Martin A. Thompson	176	9.9	−1.3
Majority		303	17.0	
Turnout		1,783	24.1	
Conservative gain from Labour		Swing		

=== 2006 election ===
The election took place on 4 May 2006.

2006 Westminster City Council election: Church Street (3)
Party	Candidate	Votes	%	±%
Labour	Aziz Toki	1,099	39.5	
Labour	Barbara Grahame	1,078		
Labour	Antony Mothersdale	979		
Conservative	Abdus Hamid	807	29.0	
Conservative	Mesbah Uddin	794		
Conservative	Alexander Shaw	663		
Respect	Yvonne Ridley	565	20.3	
Liberal Democrats	Jacqueline Castles	310	11.1	
Liberal Democrats	Paul Evans	278		
Liberal Democrats	Artemis Nicolaou	209		
Turnout			34.6	
Labour hold		Swing		
Labour hold		Swing		
Labour hold		Swing		

== 1978–2002 Westminster council elections ==
There was a revision of ward boundaries in Westminster in 1978.

== 1968–1978 Westminster council elections ==
There was a revision of ward boundaries in Westminster in 1968.

=== 1968 election ===
The election took place on 9 May 1968.

1968 Westminster City Council election: Church Street (3)
Party	Candidate	Votes	%	±%
Labour	L. Jacobs	1,298		
Labour	Kaitlin Lucan	1,217		
Labour	J. Merriton	1,169		
Conservative	J. Walker-Smith	1,149		
Conservative	D. Pearl	1,130		
Conservative	M. Hamer	1,118		
Communist	L. Temple	234		
Turnout				
Labour win (new boundaries)				
Labour win (new boundaries)				
Labour win (new boundaries)				

== 1964–1968 Westminster council elections ==
=== 1964 election ===
The election took place on 7 May 1964.

1964 Westminster City Council election: Church Street (3)
Party	Candidate	Votes	%	±%
Labour	L. Jacobs	1,807		
Labour	J. Merriton	1,678		
Labour	R. Edmonds	1,669		
Conservative	J. Pearson	774		
Conservative	C. Gimblett	773		
Conservative	K. Solomons	761		
Communist	L. Temple	218		
Turnout		2,654	30.0	
Labour win (new seat)				
Labour win (new seat)				
Labour win (new seat)				
