= Hyde Park (ward) =

Electoral ward in the City of Westminster, England

- Electoral ward for the Westminster City Council
- Borough: Westminster
- County: Greater London
- Population: 10,319 (2021)

Current electoral ward
- Created: 1965
- Councillors: 3
- GSS code: E05013796 (2022–present)

Hyde Park is an electoral ward in the City of Westminster. The ward was first used in the 1968 elections. It returns three councillors to Westminster City Council.

== Geography ==
The ward is named after Hyde Park.

== Councillors ==
Election	Councillors		
2022	Md Shamsed Chowdhury (Labour)	Paul Dimoldenberg (Labour)	Judith Southern (Labour)

== Elections ==
=== 2022 Westminster City Council election ===
Hyde Park (3 seats)
Party	Candidate	Votes	%	±%
Labour	Md Shamsed Chowdhury	804	44.7	+13.0
Labour	Paul Howard Dimoldenberg†	780	43.4	+12.2
Labour	Judith Anne Southern	774	43.0	+15.2
Conservative	Heather Acton*	758	42.1	−12.6
Conservative	Antonia Mary Cox*	709	39.4	−15.2
Conservative	Zaheed Nizar	659	36.6	−9.4
Liberal Democrats	Sarah Gonzales Ryan	249	13.8	+1.4
Liberal Democrats	Andrew Donaldson Byrne	240	13.3	+3.3
Liberal Democrats	Raked Yaghi	165	9.2	−0.3
Turnout		1,799	29.51	−1.79
Labour gain from Conservative		Swing		
Labour gain from Conservative		Swing		
Labour gain from Conservative		Swing		
