= Regent's Park (Westminster ward) =

Electoral ward in the City of Westminster, England

- Electoral ward for the Westminster City Council
- Borough: Westminster
- County: Greater London
- Population: 11,610 (2021)

Current electoral ward
- Created: 1965
- Councillors: 3
- GSS code: E05013805 (2022–present)

Regent's Park is an electoral ward in the City of Westminster. The ward was first used in the 1964 elections. It returns three councillors to Westminster City Council.

== Geography ==
The ward is named after Regent's Park.

== Councillors ==
Election	Councillors		
2022	Robert Rigby (Conservative)	Paul Swaddle (Conservative)	Ralu Oteh-Osoka (Conservative)

== Elections ==
=== 2022 Westminster City Council election ===
Regent's Park (3 seats)
Party	Candidate	Votes	%	±%
Conservative	Robert Charles Rigby*	1,140	51.3	
Conservative	Paul Swaddle*	1,097	49.4	
Conservative	Ralu Oteh-Osoka	1,059	47.7	
Labour	Md Azizul Haque	696	31.3	
Labour	Kian David Richardson	685	30.8	
Labour	Connor Whittam	653	29.4	
Green	Vivien Aviva Lichtenstein	316	14.2	
Liberal Democrats	Kathryn Hertel Kerle	308	13.9	
Liberal Democrats	Martin Philip Rowe	204	9.2	
Liberal Democrats	Julian Mark Sims	179	8.1	
Turnout		2,221	29.73	
Conservative hold		Swing		
Conservative hold		Swing		
Conservative hold		Swing		
