= Westbourne (Westminster ward) =

Electoral ward in the City of Westminster, England

- Electoral ward for the Westminster City Council
- Borough: Westminster
- County: Greater London
- Population: 11,686 (2021)

Current electoral ward
- Created: 1965
- Councillors: 3
- GSS code: E05013809 (2022–present)

Westbourne is an electoral ward in the City of Westminster. The ward was first used in the 1964 elections. It returns three councillors to Westminster City Council.

== Geography ==
The ward is based on the district of Westbourne and includes housing either side of the Westway. Westbourne Park tube station is just outside the ward.

== Councillors ==
Election	Councillors		
2022	David Boothroyd (Labour)	Angela Piddock (Labour)	Adam Hug (Labour)

== Elections ==
=== 2022 Westminster City Council election ===
Westbourne (3 seats)
Party	Candidate	Votes	%	±%
Labour	David Boothroyd*	1,277	70.7	
Labour	Angela Patricia Piddock	1,206	66.7	
Labour	Adam John Walsworth Hug*	1,193	66.0	
Conservative	Jack Berry	341	18.9	
Conservative	Louise Marie Parry	318	17.6	
Conservative	Thomas Jasper Gwyndaf Davies	300	16.6	
Liberal Democrats	Selina St Clair Mills	149	8.2	
No Description	Abby-Jan Mohamed Dharamsey	124	6.9	
Liberal Democrats	Alastair Ritchie Coomes	118	6.5	
Liberal Democrats	Joe Wright	84	4.6	
Turnout		1807	24.33	
Labour hold		Swing		
Labour hold		Swing		
Labour hold		Swing		
