= Westminster City Council =

Local authority for the City of Westminster in Greater London, England

Type
- Type: London borough council of the City of Westminster
- Houses: Unicameral

Leadership
- Lord Mayor: Karen Scarborough, Conservative since 20 May 2026
- Leader: Paul Swaddle, Conservative since 20 May 2026
- Chief Executive: Stuart Love since January 2018

Structure
- Seats: 54
- Political groups: Administration (32) Conservative (32) Other parties (22) Labour (22)
- Length of term: 4 years

Elections
- Voting system: Plurality at-large (FPTP)
- Last election: 7 May 2026
- Next election: 2 May 2030

Meeting place
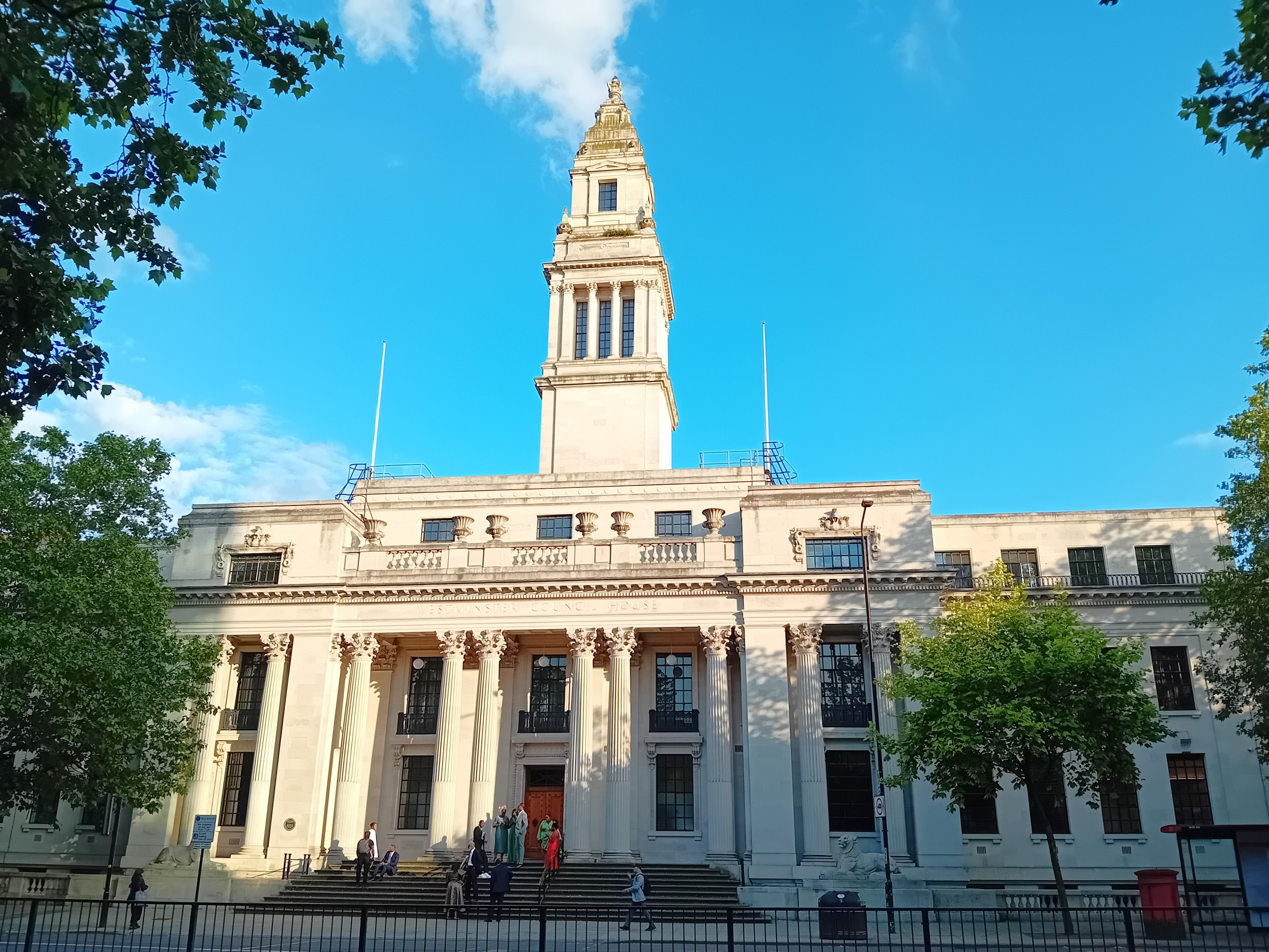
- Westminster Council House, 97–113 Marylebone Road, London, NW1 5PT

Website
- www.westminster.gov.uk

Westminster City Council is the local authority for the City of Westminster in Greater London, England. The council has been under Conservative majority control since 2026. Full council meetings are generally held at Westminster Council House, also known as Marylebone Town Hall, and the council has its main offices at Westminster City Hall on Victoria Street.

== History ==
Whilst an important centre of royal authority from Saxon times, Westminster was not formally incorporated as a borough for local government purposes until 1900. However, it was declared a city in 1540.

From 1856 the area of the modern borough was within the area governed by the Metropolitan Board of Works, which was established to provide services across the metropolis of London. In 1889 the Metropolitan Board of Works' area was made the County of London. From 1856 until 1900 the lower tier of local government within the metropolis comprised various parish vestries and district boards. One such district was initially called the Westminster District, which was renamed the St Margaret and St John Combined Vestry in 1887. In 1900 the lower tier was reorganised into metropolitan boroughs, including Westminster (which inherited Westminster's city status), Paddington and St Marylebone, each with a borough council.

The larger London borough called the City of Westminster and its council were created under the London Government Act 1963, with the first election held in 1964. For its first year the council acted as a shadow authority alongside the area's three outgoing authorities, being the metropolitan borough councils of Westminster, Paddington and St Marylebone. The new council formally came into its powers on 1 April 1965, at which point the old boroughs and their councils were abolished. In 1966 the city was granted the dignity of having a lord mayor.

From 1965 until 1986 the council was a lower-tier authority, with upper-tier functions provided by the Greater London Council. The split of powers and functions meant that the Greater London Council was responsible for "wide area" services such as fire, ambulance, flood prevention, and refuse disposal; with the boroughs (including Westminster) responsible for "personal" services such as social care, libraries, cemeteries and refuse collection. The Greater London Council was abolished in 1986 and its functions passed to the London Boroughs, with some services provided through joint committees. Westminster became a local education authority in 1990 when the Inner London Education Authority was dissolved.

In the late 1980s, the under the leadership of Conservative councillor Shirley Porter, the council was involved in the homes for votes scandal. In marginal wards, the council moved the homeless elsewhere, and sold council homes to groups who were more likely to vote Conservative. On investigation, the policy was ruled to be illegal, and it was revealed that some of the homeless had been rehoused in condemned accommodation. After leaving office, Porter was found guilty of wilful misconduct and ordered to repay £36.1 million; a payment of £12.3 million was eventually accepted.

Since 2000 the Greater London Authority has taken some responsibility for highways and planning control from the council, but within the English local government system the council remains a "most purpose" authority in terms of the available range of powers and functions.

== Powers and functions ==
The local authority derives its powers and functions from the London Government Act 1963 and subsequent legislation, and has the powers and functions of a London borough council. It sets council tax and as a billing authority also collects precepts for Greater London Authority functions and business rates. It sets planning policies which complement Greater London Authority and national policies, and decides on almost all planning applications accordingly. It is also the local education authority.

== Political control ==
The council has been under Conservative majority control since 2026.

The first election was held in 1964, initially operating as a shadow authority alongside the outgoing authorities until it came into its powers on 1 April 1965. Political control of the council since 1965 has been as follows:

Party in control	Years
Conservative	1965–2022
Labour	2022–2026
Conservative	2026–present

=== Leadership ===
The role of Lord Mayor of Westminster is largely ceremonial. Political leadership is instead provided by the leader of the council. The leaders since 1965 have been:

Councillor	Party	From	To
Gordon Pirie	Conservative	1965	1969
Arthur Barrett	Conservative	1969	1972
Guy Cubitt	Conservative	1972	1976
David Cobbold	Conservative	1976	1983
Shirley Porter	Conservative	1983	1991
David Weeks	Conservative	1991	13 Jul 1993
Miles Young	Conservative	29 Jul 1993	1995
Melvyn Caplan	Conservative	1995	2000
Simon Milton	Conservative	2000	Jun 2008
Colin Barrow	Conservative	18 Jun 2008	Mar 2012
Philippa Roe	Conservative	7 Mar 2012	25 Jan 2017
Nickie Aiken	Conservative	25 Jan 2017	22 Jan 2020
Rachael Robathan	Conservative	22 Jan 2020	May 2022
Adam Hug	Labour	18 May 2022	May 2026
Paul Swaddle	Conservative	20 May 2026	

=== Composition ===
Following the 2026 election the composition of the council was:

Party	Councillors
Conservative	32
Labour	22
Total	54

The next election is due in 2030.

== Elections ==
Since the last boundary changes in 2022 the council has comprised 54 councillors representing 18 wards, with each ward electing three councillors. Elections are held every four years.

== Wards ==
The wards of Westminster and the number of seats:

1. Abbey Road (3)
2. Bayswater (3)
3. Church Street (3)
4. Harrow Road (3)
5. Hyde Park (3)
6. Knightsbridge & Belgravia (3)
7. Lancaster Gate (3)
8. Little Venice (3)
9. Maida Vale (3)
10. Marylebone (3)
11. Pimlico North (3)
12. Pimlico South (3)
13. Queen's Park (3)
14. Regent's Park (3)
15. St James's (3)
16. Vincent Square (3)
17. West End (3)
18. Westbourne (3)

== Premises ==
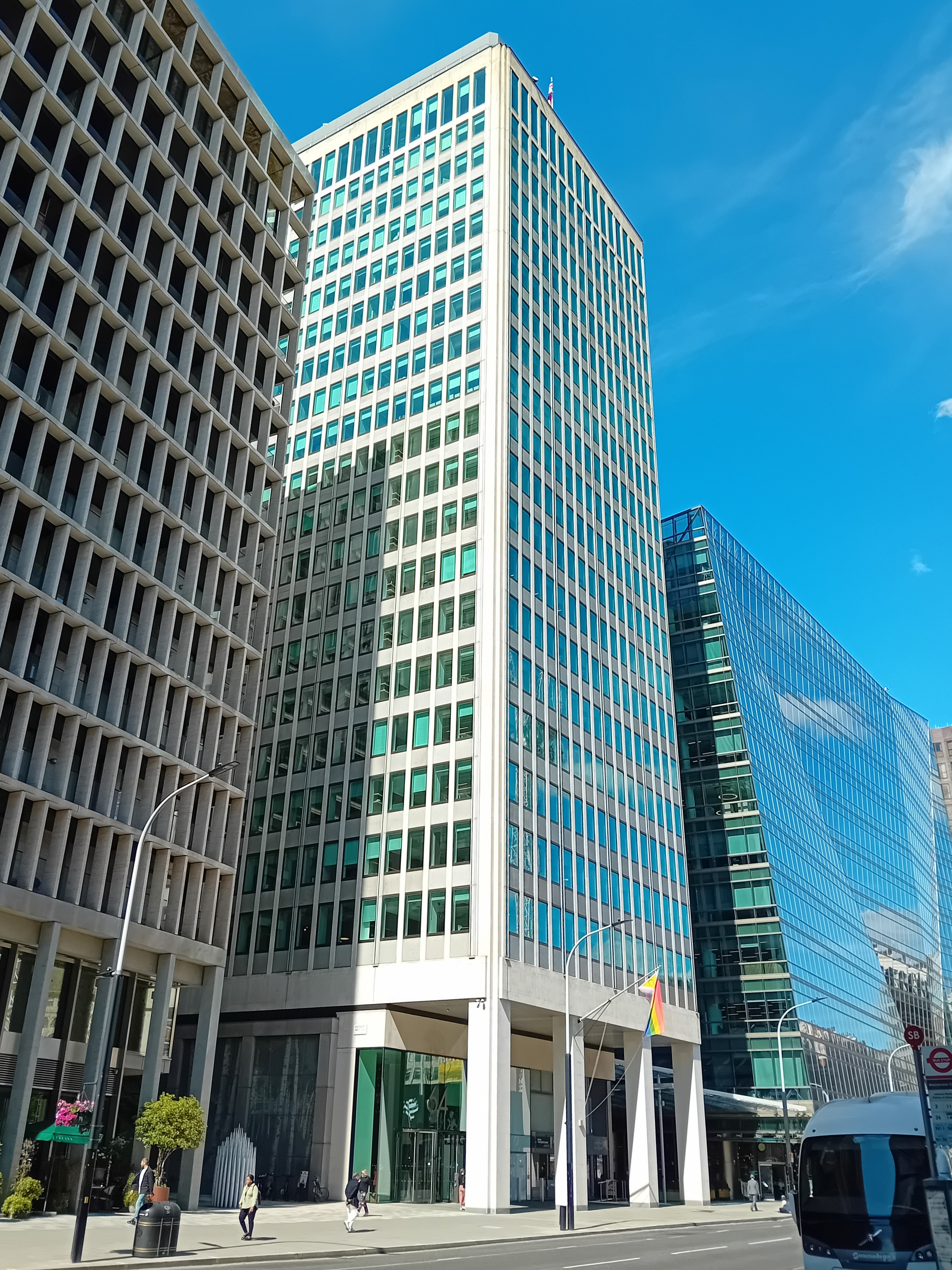
Westminster City Hall, 64 Victoria Street, London, SW1E 6QP: Council's main offices since 1966

The council has its main offices at Westminster City Hall on Victoria Street in the Victoria area. It was designed by Burnet Tait & Partners on a speculative basis, and completed in 1966. Full council meetings are held in the council chamber of Marylebone Town Hall on Marylebone Road, built in 1920 for the former Metropolitan Borough of St Marylebone, one of the council's predecessors.

== Notable councillors ==
- Diane Abbott (Labour, Harrow Road 1982–1986), MP for Hackney North and Stoke Newington since 1987
- Nickie Aiken (Conservative, Warwick 2006–2022), MP for Cities of London and Westminster 2019–2024
- Edward Argar (Conservative, Warwick ward 2006–2015), Member of Parliament for Charnwood 2015–2024; Melton and Syston since 2024
- Nicholas Boles (Conservative, West End 1998–2002), MP for Grantham and Stamford, 2010–2019
- Muriel Bowen (Conservative, Baker Street 1964–1968), councillor for Battersea South on London County Council
- Peter Bradley (Labour, Millbank 1986–1996), MP for The Wrekin, 1997–2005
- Sir Ashley Bramall (Labour, Alderney 1964–1968), MP for Bexley 1946–1950 and Leader of the Inner London Education Authority (ILEA) 1970–1981; councillor for Bethnal Green on London County Council, 1961–1965 and Greater London Council 1965–1986 (also Alderman of former Westminster City Council 1959–1965)
- John Browne (Conservative, Knightsbridge 1974–1978), MP for Winchester, 1979–1992
- Karen Buck (Labour, Queen's Park 1990–1997), MP for Regent's Park and Kensington North (1997–2010) and Westminster North 2010–2024
- Melvyn Caplan (Conservative, Little Venice 1990–present), leader of the council 1995–2000
- Greg Clark (Conservative, Warwick 2002–2005), MP for Tunbridge Wells 2005–2024
- Neale Coleman (Labour, Maida Vale 1982–1990), former senior adviser to Jeremy Corbyn as Leader of the Labour Party
- Robert Davis (Conservative, Bayswater 1982–1986; Lancaster Gate 1986–2018), deputy leader of the council, 2008–2018 and Lord Mayor (1996)
- Anthony Devenish (Conservative, Knightsbridge and Belgravia 2006–present), Member of the London Assembly for West Central 2016–2024
- Andrew Dismore (Labour, Westbourne 1982–1997), MP for Hendon 1997–2010, London Assembly Member for Barnet and Camden 2012–2021
- Jonathan Djanogly (Conservative, Regent's Park 1994–2001), MP for Huntingdon 2001–2024
- Alf Dubs, Baron Dubs (Labour, Westbourne 1971–1978), MP for Battersea South (1979–1983) and Battersea (1983–1987)
- Michael Forsyth, Baron Forsyth of Drumlean (Conservative, Churchill 1978–1982; Belgrave 1982–83), MP for Stirling 1983–1997
- Trixie Gardner, Baroness Gardner of Parkes (Conservative, Hyde Park 1968–1978), first Australian female peer. Councillor on the Greater London Council (GLC), representing Havering 1970–1973 and Enfield Southgate 1977–1986
- Mair Garside (Labour, Millbank 1996–1998), councillor for Woolwich West on London County Council (1958–1961); Greenwich (1970–1973) and Woolwich East (1973–1986) on Greater London Council
- Teresa Gorman (Conservative, Millbank 1982–1986), MP for Billericay, 1987–2001
- Illtyd Harrington (Labour, Harrow Road 1964–1968, 1971–1978; also Harrow Road South 1959–1965 on former Paddington Borough Council), deputy leader of the Greater London Council (1981–1984) and subsequently GLC chairman (1984–85)
- Michael Latham (Conservative, Churchill 1968–1971), MP for Melton, 1974–1983; Rutland and Melton 1983–1992
- Sir Spencer Le Marchant (Conservative, Warwick 1964–1971; Victoria 1956–1959, Warwick 1959–1965 on former Westminster City Council), MP for High Peak 1970–1983
- Barry Legg (Conservative, Regent's Park 1978–1991), MP for Milton Keynes South West 1992–1997
- Jonathan Lord (Conservative, Little Venice 1994–2002), MP for Woking, 2010–1924
- Serge Lourie (Labour, Westbourne 1971–1974), Social Democratic Party–Alliance councillor in Richmond Upon Thames, 1982–1990; Liberal Democrat councillor in Richmond Upon Thames, 1990–2010; Leader of the council (Richmond) 2001–02 and 2006–2010
- Kit Malthouse (Conservative, St. George's 1998–2002; Warwick 2002–2006), Assembly Member for West Central on the London Assembly; MP for North West Hampshire since 2015 and former Secretary of State for Education
- Nick Markham, Baron Markham (Conservative, Cavendish 1990–1998), former Deputy Leader of Westminster City Council; Parliamentary Under-Secretary of State in the Department of Health and Social Care 2022–2024
- Graham Mather (Conservative, Churchill 1982–1986), Member of the European Parliament for Hampshire North and Oxford (1994–1999)
- Francis Maude, Baron Maude of Horsham (Conservative, Bayswater 1978–1982; Hamilton Terrace 1982–1984), MP for North Warwickshire, 1983–1992 and Horsham, 1997–2015
- Richard May (Labour, Millbank 1971–1978), judge of the International Criminal Tribunal for the Former Yugoslavia 1997–2004; Leader of the Opposition on Westminster Council 1974–1977
- Sir Simon Milton (Conservative, Lancaster Gate 1988–2008; Hon. Alderman 2008–2011), Deputy Mayor of London for Policy and Planning (2008–2011)
- Robert Moreland (Conservative, Knightsbridge 1990–1998), MEP for Staffordshire East 1979–1984
- Sir Charles Norton (Conservative, Alderman 1964–1971; Grosvenor 1948–1962, Alderman 1962–1965 on previous Westminster City Council), solicitor
- David Pitt–Watson (Labour, Maida Vale 1986–1990), business and social entrepreneur
- Olga Polizzi (Conservative, Lancaster Gate 1989–1994), hotelier and interior designer
- Dame Shirley Porter (Conservative, Hyde Park 1974–1993), leader of the council 1983–1991 and Lord Mayor of Westminster (1991)
- Murad Qureshi (Labour, Church Street 1998–2006), Member of the London Assembly, 2004–2016; former chair of Stop the War Coalition
- Glenys Roberts (Conservative, West End 1999–2018), journalist
- Tim Roca (Labour, Harrow Road 2018–2024) Deputy Leader of Westminster City Council 2022–2024; MP for Macclesfield since 2024
- Philippa Roe, Baroness Couttie (Conservative, Knightsbridge and Belgravia 2006–2018), leader of the council 2012–2017
- Lee Rowley (Conservative, Maida Vale 2006–2014), MP for North East Derbyshire 2017–2024
- Nicholas St Aubyn (Conservative, Little Venice 1982–1986), MP for Guildford, 1997–2001
- Michael Shersby (Conservative, Maida Vale 1964–1971; also Maida Vale North 1959–1965 on former Paddington Borough Council) MP for Uxbridge, 1972–1997
- James Small-Edwards (Labour, Bayswater 2022–present), Member of the London Assembly for West Central 2024–present
- Ben Summerskill (Labour, Westbourne 1994–1998), former chief executive of Stonewall
- Manuela Sykes (Labour, Churchill 1971–1978), lecturer, writer, and public relations adviser
- Jessica Toale (Labour, West End 2022–2024), MP for Bournemouth West since 2024
- David Weeks (Conservative, Warwick 1974–1978; St. George's 1978–1998), leader of the council 1991–1993
- Anne Weyman (Labour, Little Venice 1978–1982), vice-chair of Britain for Europe
- Miles Young (Conservative, Victoria 1986–1998), businessman

== See also ==
- Homes for votes scandal
- Westminster cemeteries scandal
