= Bedfordshire Police =

English territorial police force

- Force crest
- Motto: Fighting crime, protecting the public

Agency overview
- Formed: 1966
- Preceding agencies: Bedfordshire Constabulary; Luton Borough Police
- Annual budget: £127.4 million
- Legal personality: Police force

Jurisdictional structure
- Operations jurisdiction: Bedfordshire, England
- Map of police area
- Area: 477 square miles (1,240 km^{2})
- Population: 665,000
- Legal jurisdiction: England and Wales
- General nature: Local civilian police

Operational structure
- Overseen by: His Majesty's Inspectorate of Constabulary and Fire & Rescue Services; Independent Office for Police Conduct
- Headquarters: Kempston
- Police officers: 1,317 (2020)
- Special constables: 151 (2020)
- Police and Crime Commissioner responsible: John Tizard
- Agency executive: Trevor Rodenhurst, Chief constable
- Divisions: 2

Facilities
- Stations: 11

Website
- www.beds.police.uk

Bedfordshire Police is the territorial police force responsible for policing the ceremonial county of Bedfordshire in the East of England. Its headquarters are in the town of Kempston in Bedford Borough.

As of September 2020, the force has 1,317 police officers, 151 special constables, and 1,084 staff. It covers an area of 477 square miles (1,240 km^{2}), with a population of 665,000.

== History ==
A professional police force was established in Bedfordshire in 1839, under the County Police Act 1839, replacing the earlier system of elected parish constables. It initially comprised a chief constable, who was based in Ampthill, 6 superintendents and 40 constables. Constables were paid 19 shillings a week, which was nearly twice the typical wage of an agricultural labourer in the county at that time.

There was an independent Luton Borough Police from 1876 to 1947, and then from 1964 to 1966, when it amalgamated with Bedfordshire Constabulary, which was then known as the Bedfordshire and Luton Constabulary until 1974. In 1965, Bedfordshire Constabulary had an establishment of 497 and an actual strength of 430.

On 11 June 2007, PC Jon Henry, was fatally stabbed whilst on duty in the town centre of Luton by a Nigerian immigrant, Tennyson Obih. Obih was convicted of his murder, along with the attempted murder and wounding with intent of two other men that he stabbed on the same morning.

=== Chief constables ===
- 1840–1871: Captain Edward M. Boultbee (first chief constable of Bedfordshire)
- 1871–1879: Major Ashton Cromwell Warner
- 1880–1910: Lieutenant-Colonel Frederick J. Josselyn
- 1910–1939: Lt-Colonel Frank Augustus Douglas Stevens, (accidentally shot in October 1939)
- 1939: Commander R. D. Coleridge
- 1940–1953: Commander William John Adlam Willis
- 1953–1971: Henry Prichard Pratt
- 1971–1979: Anthony Armstrong
- 1979–1983: William Sutherland
- 1983–1985: Sir Andrew Kirkpatrick Sloan
- 1985–1996: Alan Dyer (10th chief constable of Bedfordshire)
- 1996–2001: Michael O'Byrne
- 2001–2005: Paul Hancock
- 2005–2010: Gillian Parker
- 2011–2013: Alf Hitchcock
- 2013–2015: Collette Paul
- 2015–2019: Jon Boutcher
- 2019–2022: Garry Forsyth
- 2022–present: Trevor Rodenhurst

== Structure ==
Bedfordshire Police has collaborated in the formation of several specialist units with Hertfordshire Constabulary and Cambridgeshire Constabulary including Major Crime, Dogs, Firearms and Roads Policing.

The force also leads regional units including Eastern Region Special Operations Unit and Eastern Counter Terrorism Intelligence Unit with forces in Cambridgeshire, Hertfordshire, Norfolk, Suffolk and Essex.

In June 2015, the force implemented a new operating model – which comprises north and south bases and aims to increase the number of warranted officers in local communities.

== Initiatives ==
Bedfordshire Police publish results of cases on their official website, such as a drug gang who were jailed for 39 years.

In 2014, Bedfordshire Police allowed cameras into the force 24/7 to film a fly-on-the-wall documentary, 24 Hours in Police Custody, capturing some of the issues faced by police officers today. The last series ended in June 2016, but more episodes are planned for the near future.

In July 2015, Bedfordshire Police was the first force in the country to secure a female genital mutilation (FGM) protection order. The court order allowed officers to seize the passports of two young girls who it was thought were being taken to Africa.

In 2016, Bedfordshire Police's cadets scooped a national award for their outstanding contribution to helping to reduce crime and creating a safer community.

== Resources ==
The force's 2021–22 budget was set at £127.4 million. Previously, in 2017, funding pressures meant that Bedfordshire Police had considered not responding to some low level crimes. Kathryn Holloway stated that the force has made almost £35M in cuts and would face further cuts of £11.4M to £12.5M over the coming four years "if things remain unchanged".

As of September 2020, the force has 1,317 police officers, 151 special constables, and 46 police community support officers (PCSO), 20 police support volunteers (PSV), and 1,084 staff.

== Governance ==
The first Bedfordshire Police and Crime Commissioner was Olly Martins, who was elected on 15 November 2012 and took office on 21 November 2012. The performance of the police and crime commissioner (PCC) is scrutinised by the Bedfordshire Police and Crime Panel, made up of elected councillors from the local authorities in the police area, and two independent members. Before November 2012 the Bedfordshire Police Authority was the police governance. On 5 May 2016, Kathryn Holloway became the second PCC, after winning the vote against Olly Martins and other candidates. Festus Akinbusoye was elected PCC in May 2021 election. Akinbusoye assumed office on Thursday 13 May 2021

The "Our Force" control strategy determines operational priorities, helping Bedfordshire Police to protect people and fight crime.

== PEEL inspection ==
His Majesty's Inspectorate of Constabulary and Fire & Rescue Services (HMICFRS) conducts a periodic police effectiveness, efficiency and legitimacy (PEEL) inspection of each police service's performance. In its latest PEEL inspection, Bedfordshire Police was rated as follows:

	Outstanding	Good	Adequate	Requires Improvement	Inadequate
2021/22 rating	Managing offenders	Preventing crime; Treatment of the public; Developing a positive workplace; Good use of resources	Protecting vulnerable people	Investigating crime; Responding to the public	

== Gallery ==
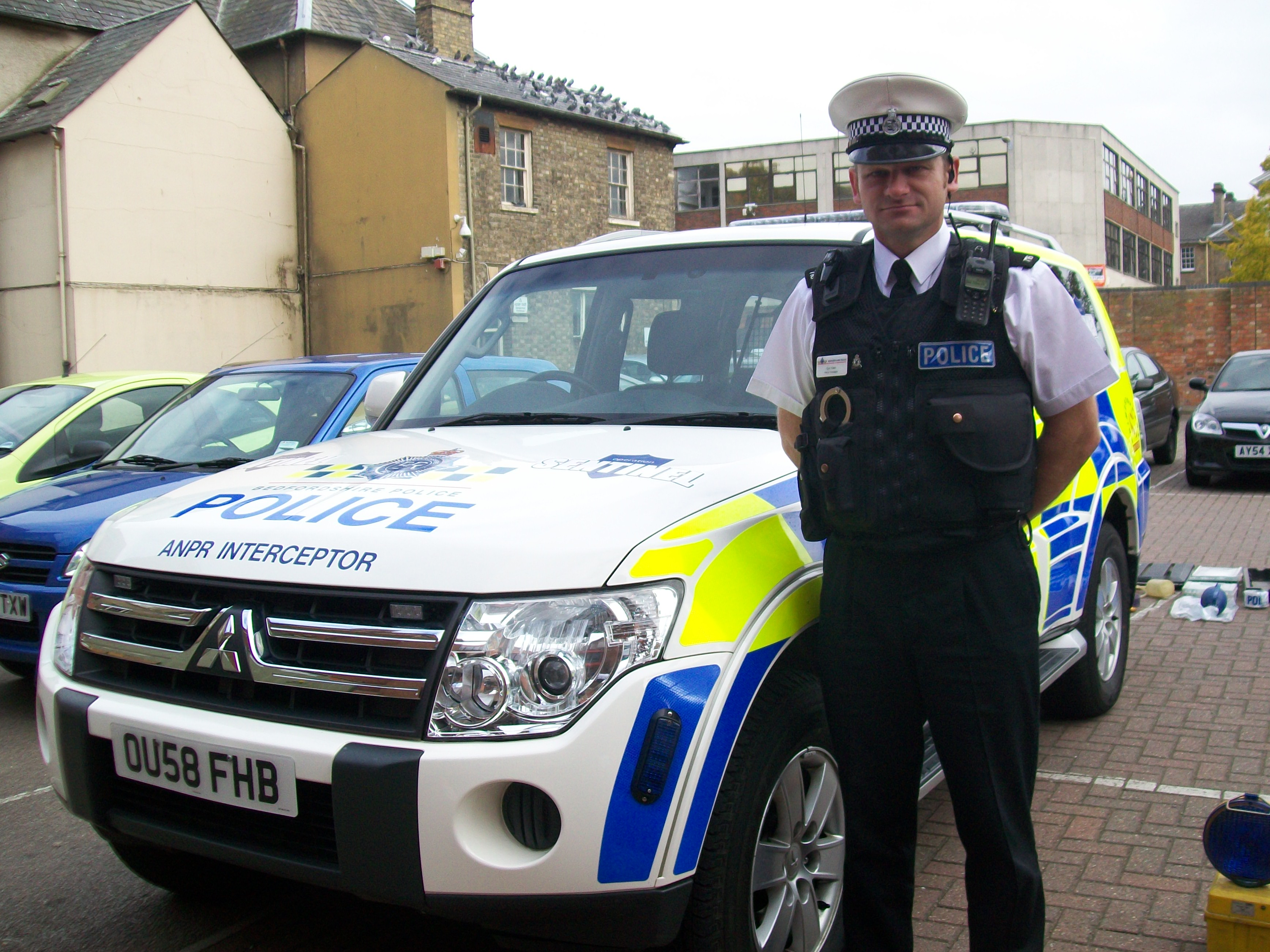
A Bedfordshire Police officer and ANPR vehicle pictured in 2009

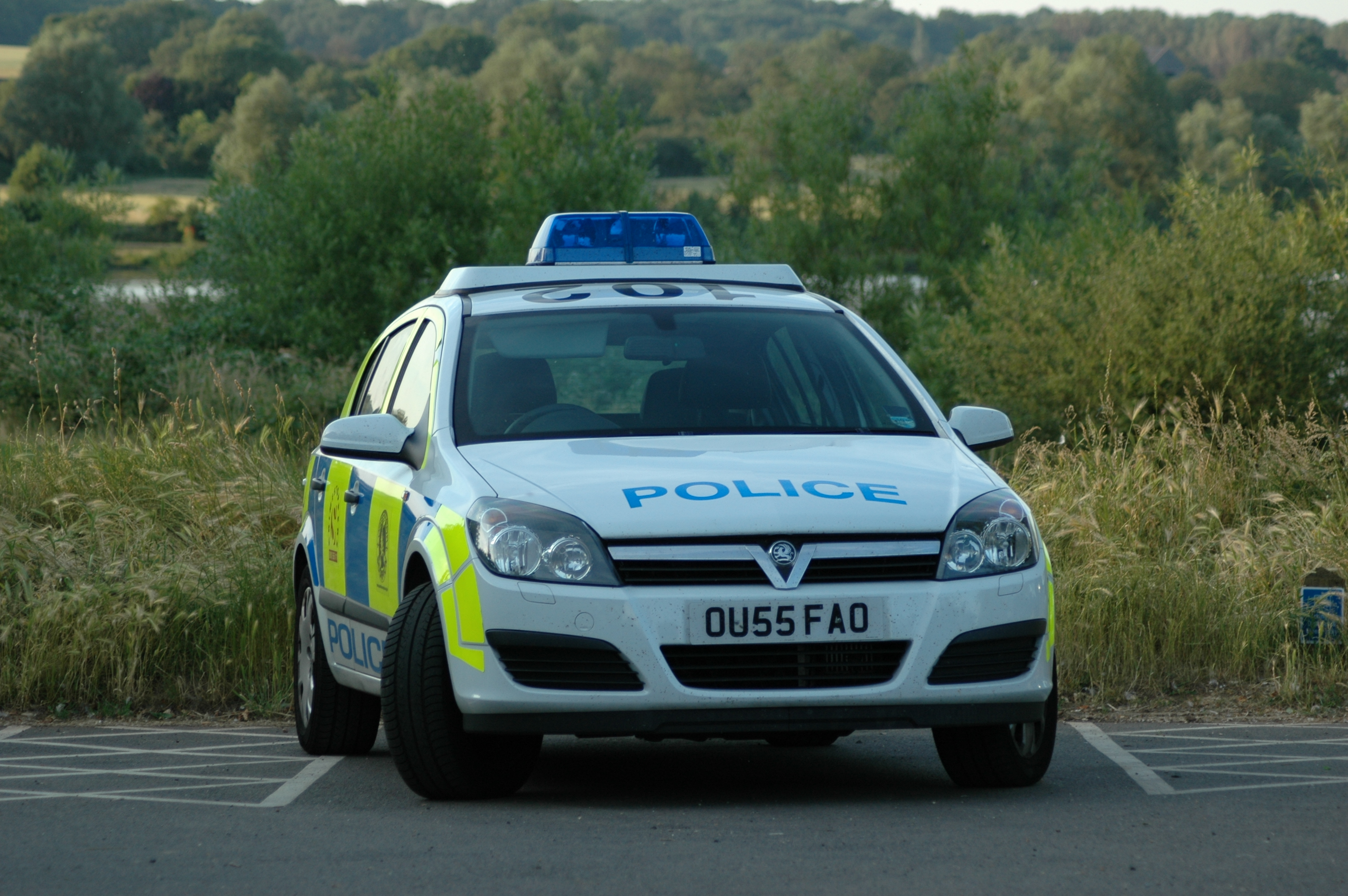
A typical police car seen in Bedfordshire pictured in 2006

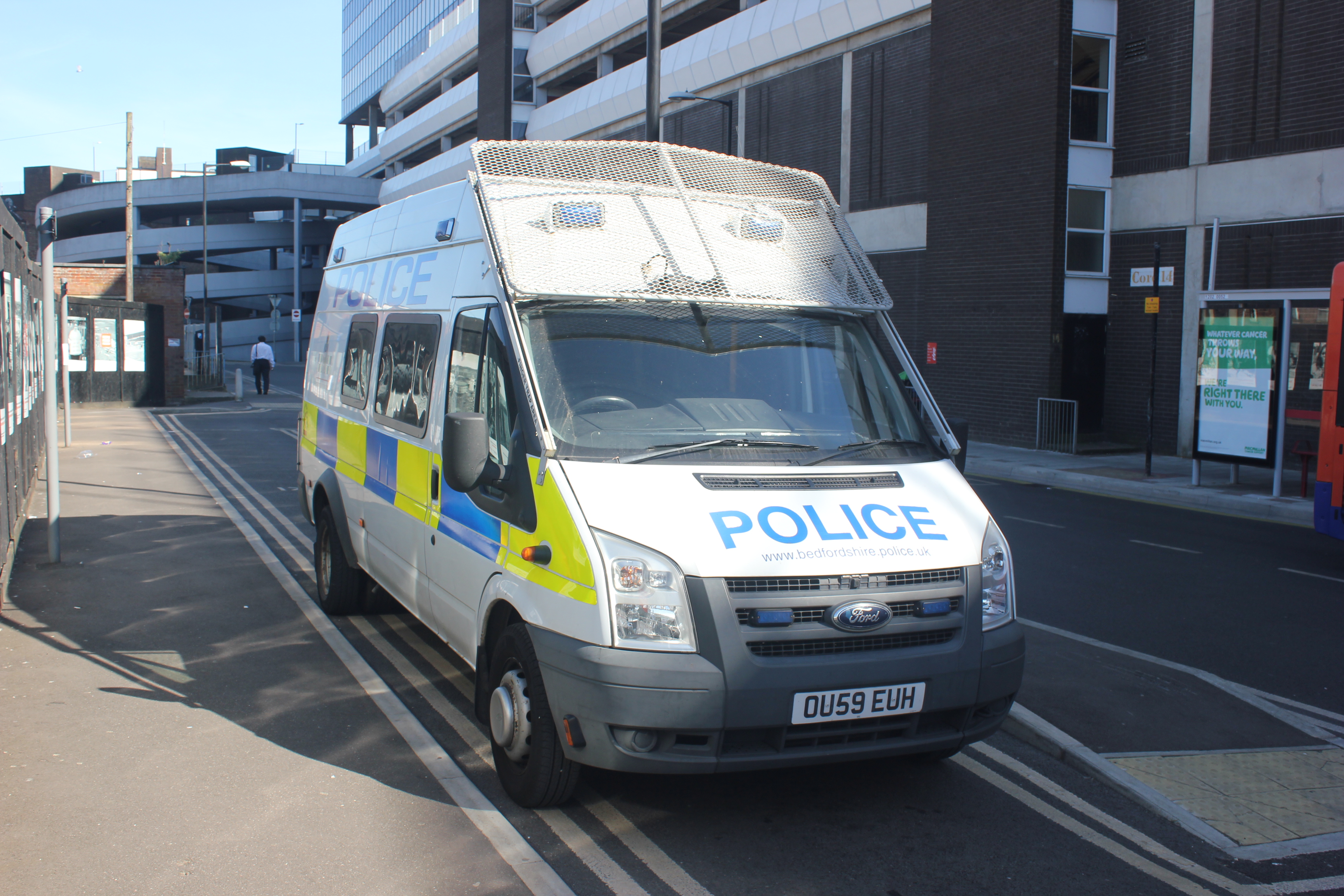
A armoured personnel van in Luton in 2020

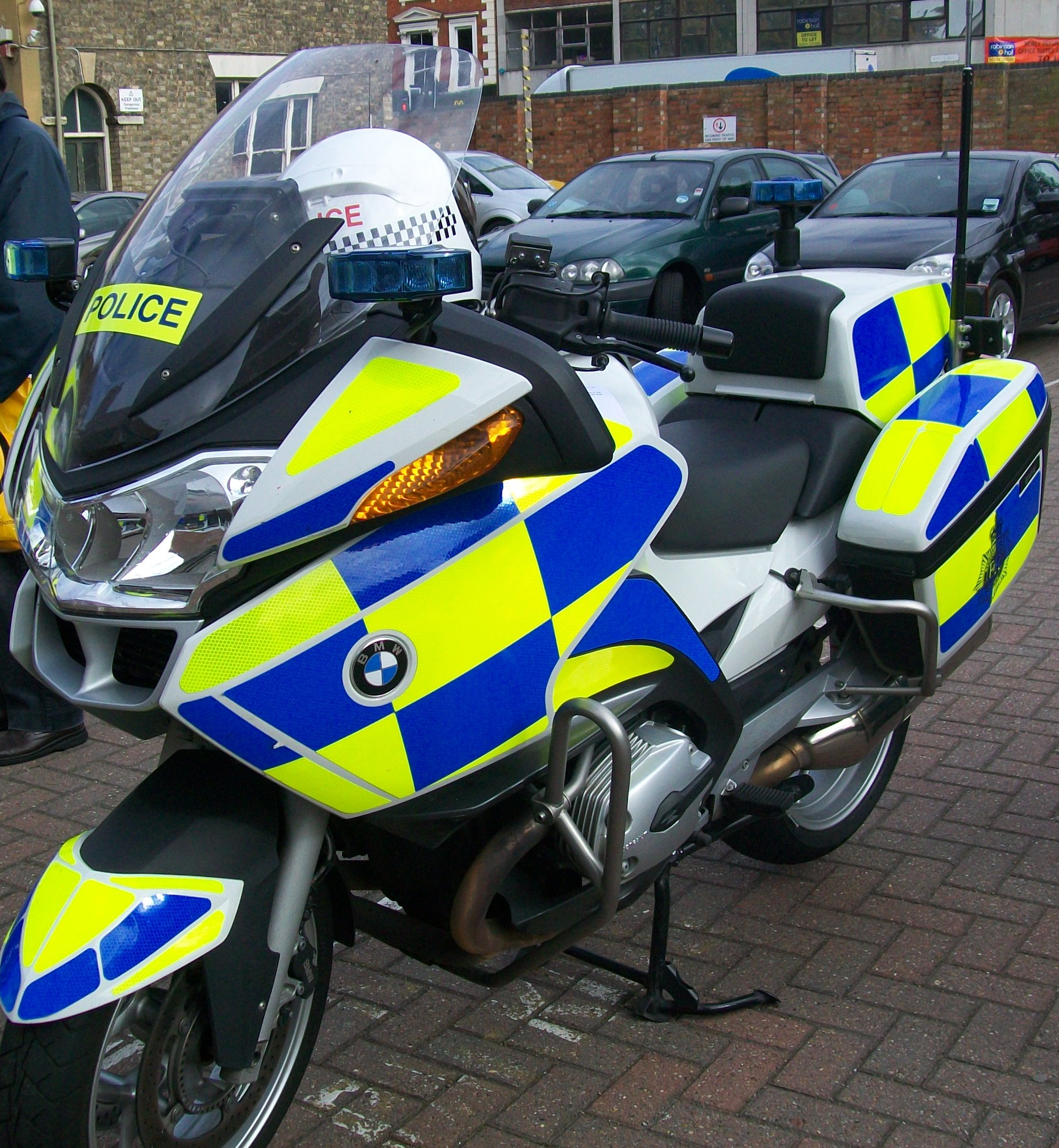
A BMW police motorcycle on display in 2009

== See also ==
- List of law enforcement agencies in the United Kingdom, Crown Dependencies and British Overseas Territories
- Bedfordshire and Luton Fire and Rescue Service
