= Community council =

Public representative body in Great Britain

A community council is a public representative body in Great Britain.

In England they may be statutory parish councils by another name, under the Local Government and Public Involvement in Health Act 2007, or they may be non-statutory bodies. In Scotland and Wales they are statutory bodies.

Scottish community councils were first created under the Local Government (Scotland) Act 1973, many years after Scottish parish councils were abolished by the Local Government (Scotland) Act 1929.

Welsh community councils – which may, if they wish, style themselves town councils – are a direct replacement, under the Local Government Act 1972, for the previously existing parish councils and are identical to English parish councils in terms of their powers and the way in which they operate.

== England ==
In England, a parish council can call itself a community council, as an 'alternative style' under the Local Government and Public Involvement in Health Act 2007. There are thirty-eight charitable rural community councils with a rural development function, covering areas such as community planning, community buildings support, rural transport schemes and rural affordable housing (exception sites). The rural community councils are linked by the charity ACRE (Action with Communities in Rural England) and form the Rural Community Action Network (RCAN).

Established in 1947, the National Association of Local Councils is the national body which represents the interests of 10,000 local (parish and town) councils and 100,000 councillors across England. NALC works to support, promote and improve local councils. Local councils is a universal term in England for community, neighbourhood, parish and town councils, which are the first tier of English local government.

The process for establishing a local council requires a signed petition by at least 7.5% of the local electorate (more signatures if there are less than 2,500 electors). The local authority will then undertake a 'governance review' to assess the request and to make a final decision.

In June 2012, Westminster City Council approved the establishment of Queen's Park Community Council as the first civil parish created in London since new legislation was enacted in 2007. The first election of councillors to the Community Council took place in May 2014 at the same time as other local elections. Subsequent elections are held every four years at the same time as elections to the borough council, with a new parish council being elected as part of the 2018 Westminster City Council election.

== Scotland ==
In Scotland community councils have fewer powers than their English or Welsh counterparts. As of July 2012, there were 1,369 community council areas in Scotland, some of which represent several communities within their boundary.

Community councils were introduced in 1975 under the Local Government (Scotland) Act 1973. The duty was placed on the newly established district councils to prepare an establishment scheme to divide their district into community council areas. In 1996 this duty passed to the present area councils.

Scotland's network of parishes was abolished for administrative purposes in 1930, when larger district councils were formed. Unlike Wales, the new CCs created in 1975 were not necessarily based on old parish areas, which no longer fit any modern administrative areas. Several of them are based on former burghs, and have rematriculated the burgh coat of arms and use the title "provost" for their chairman.

The acts of Parliament governing community councils allow for them to "take any action" they deem appropriate to improve their community. They set out the requirements of each local authority's "scheme for the establishment of Community Councils".

All of Scotland has had community council areas delineated, the numbers and boundaries of which can be altered by the area council. However not all communities have community councils, which in Scotland are statutory and only exist if local people are willing to stand for election. They are officially stated to be "non-party-political and non-sectarian" in their discussions and decision making. Community councils must adopt a constitution stating the name of the community council and dealing with such matters as the frequency of meetings, office bearers, method of election, finance and standing orders.

There have been a number of reviews of the role of community councils in Scotland, generally emphasising their importance to democratic renewal. One important one was the McIntosh Report on Local Government and the Scottish Parliament.

Membership of community councils consists of:

- Elected members: The local authority's establishment scheme details the number of elected councillors, and the areas for which they shall be elected.

Some community councils currently allow:

- Co-opted members: The community council may co-opt additional members with particular skills or interests that will assist them in their work. These members may be co-opted for a specific period of time, or dismissed at the community council's pleasure. It is permitted for persons of between 14 and 18 years of age to be co-opted to represent the interests of "youth".
- Ex officio members: The constitutions of many community councils provide that the area councillor for the ward containing the community council area, local MPs and MSPs shall be ex officio members.

Co-opted and ex officio members have no votes on the councils and may not be office bearers.

The establishment scheme will set out the exact procedure for establishing a council where one does not exist: a stated number of local government electors in the designated area must petition the area council, who will then schedule elections. In the case of all community council elections, if nominations are received for less than fifty percent of the seats, the election is postponed and the council not formed or dissolved. Community councils can only be dissolved if the number of elected members falls below the set minimum. Community councils can also choose to amalgamate themselves with an adjoining community council by a similar process.

Like in England and Wales, the main role of the CCs is to act as a channel of the opinions of the local community, and have the right to be notified of and respond to any planning applications. They are also sometimes involved in local projects mostly related to local infrastructure such as footpaths, parks, playgrounds etc., and local events.

Unlike in England and Wales, Scottish CCs do not have the right to raise funds by setting a precept on local taxes, and are instead dependent upon local authority funding, which is usually received for running costs only and that funding has been cut several times in the recent years.

In some areas of Scotland, especially in the Highland Council area, CCs are very often disregarded and are not usually viewed as a tier of government, even though they can legally have that role. Although in places such as Orkney and Shetland, CCs are viewed as an important part of local government, and receive larger budgets.

== Wales ==
Until 1974, Wales was divided into civil parishes. These were abolished by section 20(6) of the Local Government Act 1972, and replaced by communities by section 27 of the same Act.

The principal areas of Wales are divided entirely into communities. Unlike in England, where unparished areas exist, no part of Wales is outside a community, even in urban areas. Not every community has a council, however.

Community councils in Wales are identical to English parish councils in terms of their powers and the way they operate. Welsh community councils may call themselves town councils unilaterally and may have city status granted by the Crown. In Wales, all town councils are community councils. There are currently three community councils with city status: Bangor, St Asaph and St David's. The community of Caernarfon has the status of a royal town. The chair of a town council or city council will usually have the title mayor.

In communities with populations too small to justify a full community council, community meetings will be established. Community councils in Wales now come under the Local Government (Wales) Measure 2011 under Part 7.

One Voice Wales was established in 2004 and is the main organisation for community and town councils in Wales. The association represents the interests of councils across Wales and offers a range of other support services. One Voice Wales is also a portal for advice on how to set up a new council or to become a councillor. Elections are held every five years under the first-past-the-post voting system.

There are 735 community and town councils and 8,000 councillors in Wales, covering approximately 94% of the land area and 70% of the population of Wales.

The process for establishing a local council in Wales differs from England and Scotland. It requires the community to organise a public meeting, and for a majority of those present, to then agree to hold a community poll. A minimum 10% of the total local government community electorate or 150 electors (if 10% exceeds 150) must be present and voting at this meeting. If a poll is agreed upon, the local authority must organise one at least 42 days after the decision to hold the poll was taken. A simple majority is required in the poll for a community or town council to be created. A poll cannot take place more than once every two years, if previously rejected.

In May 2022, only three of Bridgend County Borough's twenty community councils had enough candidates coming forward to hold full elections. One council had only one candidate for 15 council seats. This led to a claim that the situation had "reached crisis point".
