= Marylebone (disambiguation) =

Marylebone is an area in London.

Marylebone may also refer to:

- Metropolitan Borough of St Marylebone, London borough disestablished in 1965
- Marylebone (ward), ward used for elections to the Westminster City Council
- Marylebone (constituency), disestablished 1885
- St Marylebone (UK Parliament constituency), disestablished 1983
- St Marylebone (London County Council constituency), disestablished 1965
