= Alf Hitchcock =

British police officer (1958–2017)

Alf Hitchcock CBE QPM

Chief Constable, Ministry of Defence Police
- In office 2013 – 16 June 2017

Chief Constable of Bedfordshire
- In office 2011–2013

Managing Director (Deputy Chief Constable), National Policing Improvement Agency
- In office 2009–2011

Personal details
- Born: Alfred Henry Hitchcock; 1958
- Died: 16 June 2017 (aged 58–59)

Alfred Henry Hitchcock (1958 – 16 June 2017) was a British police officer.

Hitchcock joined Lancashire Constabulary as a constable in 1977 just before his 19th birthday. He rose through the ranks to superintendent and served as associate director of the National Strategic Command Course at Bramshill Police College. In January 2003, he transferred to the Metropolitan Police in London as Commander Specialist Crime, and from 2004, was a Commander Territorial Policing, in command of nine London boroughs and co-ordinating the introduction of neighbourhood policing across London in 2005–2006. He became temporary Deputy Assistant Commissioner Territorial Policing, and was the promoted to substantive deputy assistant commissioner in 2007 and appointed DAC Operational Services, where he was deputy head of professional standards, command and control, and diversity and citizen focus. He was promoted to acting assistant commissioner in 2007 and served as Assistant Commissioner Operational Services until 2008. He was awarded the Queen's Police Medal (QPM) in the 2008 New Year Honours.

In April 2009, he retired from the Metropolitan Police, but immediately became managing director with the rank of deputy chief constable at the National Policing Improvement Agency at Bramshill, where he helped to set up the National College of Police Leadership. In January 2011, he was appointed chief constable of Bedfordshire Police, completely restructuring the force. In June 2013, he became chief constable of the Ministry of Defence Police. He was appointed Commander of the Order of the British Empire (CBE) in the 2017 New Year Honours for services to defence and policing.

Hitchcock was the Association of Chief Police Officers national lead for knife crime from 2008, when he developed the National Tackling Knives Action Programme, and for equality and human rights from 2012 to 2016.

Hitchcock took a BSc in psychology at the University of Central Lancashire from 1992 to 1997, an MA (Econ) in organisational management at the University of Manchester from 1997 to 2000, an MBA at Lancashire Business School from 2002 to 2003, and a postgraduate diploma in applied criminology. He was a Fellow of the Chartered Management Institute from 2003 to 2014. He was married to Helen and had two daughters. He died in hospital on 16 June 2017 while still in office following a short illness. His funeral, with full police honours, took place at St Paul's Church, Bedford, on 6 July 2017 and was attended by hundreds of people.

== Honours ==

Ribbon	Description	Notes
	Order of the British Empire (CBE)	
	Queen's Police Medal (QPM)	
	Queen Elizabeth II Golden Jubilee Medal	
	Queen Elizabeth II Diamond Jubilee Medal	
	Police Long Service and Good Conduct Medal	

== Footnotes ==
Police appointments
Preceded by Unknown	Deputy Assistant Commissioner Territorial Policing, Metropolitan Police; 2006–2007	Succeeded by Unknown
Preceded by Unknown	Deputy Assistant Commissioner Operational Services, Metropolitan Police; 2007–2009	Succeeded by Unknown
Preceded by John Yates	Acting Assistant Commissioner Operational Services, Metropolitan Police; 2007–2008	Succeeded by Last incumbent
Preceded by Unknown	Managing Director (Deputy Chief Constable), National Policing Improvement Agency; 2009–2011	Succeeded by Unknown
Preceded by Gillian Parker	Chief Constable of Bedfordshire; 2011–2013	Succeeded by Colette Paul
Preceded by Stephen Love	Chief Constable, Ministry of Defence Police; 2013–2017	Succeeded by Andy Adams
