= Queen's Park Community Council =

Local authority for Queen's Park, London, England

- Council logo

Type
- Type: Parish council
- Houses: Unicameral

History
- Founded: 1 April 2014; 12 years ago

Leadership
- Chair of Council: Eartha Pond
- Director: Shuwanna Aaron

Structure
- Seats: 12 councillors
- Graph of the party split among 12 seats.
- Political groups: All parties (12) Independent (12)
- Length of term: 4 years

Elections
- Voting system: Plurality-at-large
- First election: May 2014
- Last election: May 2022
- Next election: May 2026

Meeting place
- Beethoven Centre

Website
- www.queensparkcommunitycouncil.gov.uk

Queen's Park Community Council (QPCC) is the parish council for the civil parish of Queen's Park in the City of Westminster. The council was the first to be formed in Greater London and remains the only one. It was established on 1 April 2014 following a referendum of residents in 2012. Elections to the community council are held every four years and coincide with Westminster City Council elections. The first election of 12 councillors from four wards took place on 22 May 2014. The chair of the council is Roger Diamond.

== Background ==
Parish councils were established in England in 1894. They had been eliminated from the London area by 1936 and were not permitted in Greater London when it was created in 1965. The Local Government and Public Involvement in Health Act 2007 permitted the creation of parish councils in the 32 London boroughs and permitted the alternative naming style of community council. A referendum was held in the Queen's Park ward of Westminster in 2012 to gauge support for a new parish council and it was approved by Westminster City Council in May 2012. The council was created on 1 April 2014 as part of the City of Westminster (Reorganisation of Community Governance) Order 2013. The first elections took place on 22 May 2014 and then every four years to coincide with the Westminster City Council elections.

== Chair of the council ==
The council elects a chair at its annual meeting in May of each year. The current holder of the post is Roger Diamond.

Previous holders have been:

| Name | Term |
|---|---|
| Roger Diamond | 2026–present |
| Eartha Pond | 2022– 2026 |
| John McArdle | 2020–2022 |
| Gillian Fitzhugh MBE | 2018–2020 |
| Susanna Rustin | 2016–2018 |
| Angeal Singhate | 2014–2016 |

== Elections ==
=== 2026 election ===
Elections to Queen's Park Community Council were held on 7 May 2026 alongside the 2026 Westminster City Council election Sixteen candidates ran for election in the QPA, QPC, QPB and QPD wards, returning the votes shown below. The community council was counted at the same time as the city council seats.

2026 Queen's Park Community Council election: QPA (3)
| Party | Candidate | Votes | % | ±% |
|---|---|---|---|---|
| Independent | SWEENEY, Emma Jean | 686 | N/A | N/A |
| Independent | ABOU-JAIB, Lydia Caroline | 534 | N/A | N/A |
| Independent | HARRISON, Richard | 328 | N/A | N/A |
| Independent | EDWARD, Chanel | 270 | N/A | N/A |
| Independent hold | | Swing | N/A | |
| Independent hold | | Swing | N/A | |
| Independent hold | | Swing | N/A | |

2026 Queen's Park Community Council election: QPB (3)
| Party | Candidate | Votes | % | ±% |
|---|---|---|---|---|
| Independent | ALI, Shifaa | 440 | | |
| Independent | LAWRENCE, Orrel | 377 | | |
| Independent | DIAMOND, Roger | 353 | | |
| Independent | NICHOLS, Shervon | 290 | | |
| Independent hold | | Swing | N/A | |
| Independent hold | | Swing | N/A | |
| Independent hold | | Swing | N/A | |

=== 2024 co-option ===
A casual vacancy arising in January 2024 was filled by the council by the co-option of Afsana Aktar on 22 May 2024.

=== 2023 co-option ===
A casual vacancy arising in September 2023 was filled by the council by the co-option of Shifaa Ali on 15 November 2023.

=== 2022 election ===
Elections to Queen's Park Community Council were held on 5 May 2022 alongside the 2022 Westminster City Council election. Nine candidates were returned unopposed in the QPA, QPC and QPD wards, while the QPB ward was contested, returning the votes shown below. The community council was counted at the same time as the city council seats.

2022 Queen's Park Community Council election: QPA (3)
| Party | Candidate | Votes | % | ±% |
|---|---|---|---|---|
| Independent | Ryan Dalton | uncontested | N/A | N/A |
| Independent | Gillian Fitzhugh | uncontested | N/A | N/A |
| Independent | Emma Sweeney | uncontested | N/A | N/A |
| Independent hold | | Swing | N/A | |
| Independent hold | | Swing | N/A | |
| Independent hold | | Swing | N/A | |

2022 Queen's Park Community Council election: QPB (3)
| Party | Candidate | Votes | % | ±% |
|---|---|---|---|---|
| Independent | Samantha Alleyne | 286 | | |
| Local Resident | Roger Diamond | 269 | | |
| Independent | David Fakhr | 233 | | |
| Independent | Marcus Leon | 87 | | |
| Majority | | | | |
| Turnout | | | | |
| Independent hold | | Swing | N/A | |
| Independent hold | | Swing | N/A | |
| Independent hold | | Swing | N/A | |

2022 Queen's Park Community Council election: QPC (3)
| Party | Candidate | Votes | % | ±% |
|---|---|---|---|---|
| Independent | Brian Nicholas | uncontested | N/A | N/A |
| Independent | Eartha Pond | uncontested | N/A | N/A |
| Independent | Stella Wilson | uncontested | N/A | N/A |
| Independent hold | | Swing | N/A | |
| Independent hold | | Swing | N/A | |
| Independent hold | | Swing | N/A | |

2022 Queen's Park Community Council election: QPD (3)
| Party | Candidate | Votes | % | ±% |
|---|---|---|---|---|
| Independent | Sandra Bynoe | uncontested | N/A | N/A |
| Independent | Orrel Lawrence | uncontested | N/A | N/A |
| Independent | John McArdle | uncontested | N/A | N/A |
| Independent hold | | Swing | N/A | |
| Independent hold | | Swing | N/A | |
| Independent hold | | Swing | N/A | |

=== 2018 co-option ===
A casual vacancy arising from not enough candidates standing for ward QPB at the May 2018 election was filled by the co-option of Alfrena Barbe by the council on 4 June 2018.

=== 2018 election ===
Elections to Queen's Park Community Council were held on 3 May 2018 alongside the 2018 Westminster City Council election. Eight candidates were returned unopposed in wards QPA, QPB and QPD. The QPC ward was contested returning the votes shown below. The community council was counted at the same time as the city council seats.

2018 Queen's Park Community Council election: QPA (3)
| Party | Candidate | Votes | % | ±% |
|---|---|---|---|---|
| Independent | Ryan Ardehali | uncontested | N/A | N/A |
| Independent | Gillian Fitzhugh | uncontested | N/A | N/A |
| Independent | Emma Sweeney | uncontested | N/A | N/A |
| Independent hold | | Swing | N/A | |
| Independent hold | | Swing | N/A | |
| Independent hold | | Swing | N/A | |

2018 Queen's Park Community Council election: QPB (3)
| Party | Candidate | Votes | % | ±% |
|---|---|---|---|---|
| Independent | Raymond Lancashire | uncontested | N/A | N/A |
| Independent | Susanna Rustin | uncontested | N/A | N/A |
| Independent hold | | Swing | N/A | |
| Independent hold | | Swing | N/A | |

2018 Queen's Park Community Council election: QPC (3)
| Party | Candidate | Votes | % | ±% |
|---|---|---|---|---|
| 52 years resident father supporting diversity | Brian Nicholas | 302 | 25.6 | N/A |
| Promoting mental health and youth engagement | Stella Wilson | 292 | 24.7 | N/A |
| Start here, make a difference! | Eartha Pond | 208 | 17.6 | N/A |
| Independent: Committed to representing the unrepresented | Angela Singhate | 207 | 17.5 | N/A |
| Queen's Park Resident for 19 years | Richard Saturley | 172 | 14.6 | N/A |
| Majority | | 1 | 0.1 | N/A |
| Turnout | | 1181 | | N/A |
| Independent hold | | Swing | | |
| Independent hold | | Swing | | |
| Independent hold | | Swing | | |

2018 Queen's Park Community Council election: QPD (3)
| Party | Candidate | Votes | % | ±% |
|---|---|---|---|---|
| Independent | Leslie Barson | uncontested | | |
| Independent | Orrel Lawrence | uncontested | | |
| Independent | John Mcardle | uncontested | | |
| Independent hold | | Swing | N/A | |
| Independent hold | | Swing | N/A | |
| Independent hold | | Swing | N/A | |

=== 2017 co-option ===
A casual vacancy arising in July 2017 was filled by the council by the co-option of Nasima Khanom on 20 September 2017.

=== 2014 election ===
Electors went to the polls on 22 May 2014 for the newly established Queen's Park Community Council, with both votes cast and results counted at the same time as the 2014 Westminster City Council election. The community council is non party-political, with all candidates standing as 'independents'. Three candidates were elected to each of wards QPA and QPB, and three returned unopposed for each of QPC and QPD.

2014 Queen's Park Community Council election: QPA (3)
| Party | Candidate | Votes | % | ±% |
|---|---|---|---|---|
| Queen's Park community council action group | Joe Fernandes | 501 | 21.0 | N/A |
| Community Council founding member vice chair | Emma Sweeney | 488 | 20.5 | N/A |
| Independent Young Local Resident | Ryan Dalton | 399 | 16.7 | N/A |
| Helping to create a better community | Kimberley Durrance | 336 | 14.1 | N/A |
| Resident, passionate about families and communities | Pepe Mykoo | 334 | 14.0 | N/A |
| Helping to create a better community | Angie Durrance | 334 | 13.6 | N/A |
| Majority | | 63 | 2.6 | N/A |
| Turnout | | 2383 | | N/A |
| Independent win (new seat) | | | | |
| Independent win (new seat) | | | | |
| Independent win (new seat) | | | | |

2014 Queen's Park Community Council election: QPB (3)
| Party | Candidate | Votes | % | ±% |
|---|---|---|---|---|
| For a safer, happier community | Emma Morgan | 487 | 27.4 | N/A |
| Local activist for disadvantaged youth | Musa Ahmed | 394 | 22.1 | N/A |
| Creating a better community | Julius Hogben | 380 | 21.4 | N/A |
| Working towards improving the Queen's Park community | Deborah Lauder | 291 | 16.4 | N/A |
| Giving the community a new voice | Fiona Doherty | 228 | 12.8 | N/A |
| Majority | | 89 | 5.0 | N/A |
| Turnout | | 1780 | | N/A |
| Independent win (new seat) | | | | |
| Independent win (new seat) | | | | |
| Independent win (new seat) | | | | |

2014 Queen's Park Community Council election: QPC (3)
| Party | Candidate | Votes | % | ±% |
|---|---|---|---|---|
| Queen's Park Community Council Campaigner | Katie Cowan | uncontested | N/A | N/A |
| Start here, make a difference | Eartha Pond | uncontested | N/A | N/A |
| Community Council Founding Member and Chair | Angela Singhate | uncontested | N/A | N/A |
| Independent win (new seat) | | | | |
| Independent win (new seat) | | | | |
| Independent win (new seat) | | | | |

2014 Queen's Park Community Council election: QPD (3)
| Party | Candidate | Votes | % | ±% |
|---|---|---|---|---|
| Representing young people of Queen's Park | Philip Andokou | uncontested | N/A | N/A |
| Community council founding member | Gill Fitzhugh | uncontested | N/A | N/A |
| Queen's Park Community Council Campaign | Susanna Rustin | uncontested | N/A | N/A |
| Independent win (new seat) | | | | |
| Independent win (new seat) | | | | |
| Independent win (new seat) | | | | |

=== 2012 referendum ===
The referendum was held during May 2012.

2012 Queen's Park Community Council referendum
| Choice | Votes | % |
|---|---|---|
| Yes | 1,100 | 68.41 |
| No | 508 | 31.59 |
| Total | 1,608 | 100.00 |
| Registered voters/turnout | 8,058 | 20 |
Source: Westminster Community Governance Review
