= 2028 London mayoral election =

2028 election for the Mayor of London

- 4 May 2028
- Opinion polls
Incumbent Mayor
Sadiq Khan
Labour

The 2028 London mayoral election is scheduled to be held on 4 May 2028 to elect the Mayor of London. The election will take place the same day alongside the elections to the London Assembly, as well as local elections across England including other mayoral elections. The incumbent Labour Party mayor, Sadiq Khan, won the previous three mayoral elections.

== Electoral system ==
The election is expected to use a supplementary vote system for the first time since the 2021 London mayoral election, in which voters express a first and a second preference for candidates. This means that the winning candidate has the support of a majority of voters who expressed a preference among the top two. Whilst a reintroduction of the supplementary vote system for the election of the mayor of London is included in the English Devolution and Community Empowerment Act 2026, an election would currently be held under first-past-the-post voting until the relevant secondary legislation is introduced.

The 2024 election also saw the ballots counted by hand for the first time, after previous mayoral elections had used a technological solution where ballots were scanned. The Greater London Authority are considering returning to a scanning system for 2028.

== Candidates ==
=== Labour Party ===
Incumbent mayor Sadiq Khan is expected to stand for a fourth term. In September 2025, Khan said it was his "intention" to stand again in 2028, and, in February 2026, said he had "already worked out" his campaign for the next election. It had been reported that he was expected to stand down, and in June 2025, the New Statesman reported that Khan had privately indicated he did not wish to stand.

Dawn Butler, the MP for Brent East, said in an interview with The Guardian in 2023 that she would put her name forwards if Khan were not to stand. In 2025, she confirmed her intention to stand if Khan stood down.

Other potential candidates include:

- Rosena Allin-Khan, MP for Tooting,
- Mete Coban, Deputy Mayor of London for Environment and Energy,
- Stella Creasy, MP for Walthamstow,
- Idris Elba, actor and knife crime activist,
- Florence Eshalomi, MP for Vauxhall and Camberwell Green,
- Georgia Gould, MP for Queen's Park and Maida Vale and Minister of State for Schools,
- Claire Holland, leader of Lambeth Council,
- Lewis Iwu, campaigner and author,
- David Lammy, MP for Tottenham and former Deputy Prime Minister,
- Emily Thornberry, MP for Islington South and Finsbury.

=== Conservative Party ===
James Cleverly, MP for Braintree and former Home Secretary, was announced as the Conservative Party's candidate on 19 November 2026. He had resigned on 29 August 2026 as the Shadow Secretary of State for Housing, Communities and Local Government to run for mayor.

Cleverly was chosen from a shortlist of three candidates, which was announced on 31 October 2026. The other two shortlisted were:

- Festus Akinbusoye, former Bedfordshire Police and Crime Commissioner, and member of Westminster City Council.
- Sara Gezdari, former Richmond Park parliamentary candidate

Other potential candidates had included:

- Nickie Aiken, former MP for Cities of London and Westminster,
- Andrew Boff, member of the London Assembly,
- Alex Challoner, founder of public relations company Cavendish Communications,
- Sebastian Coe, Baron Coe, former athlete, sports administrator, World Athletics president and life peer,
- Justine Greening, former MP for Putney and former Education Secretary and Secretary of State for International Development,
- Paul Scully, former MP for Sutton and Cheam, former London minister and deputy party chairman, and candidate for mayor in 2024.

=== Reform UK ===
In January 2026, Reform announced that Laila Cunningham, at the time a member of Westminster City Council and former CPS prosecutor, who defected from the Conservative Party to Reform UK in June 2025, would be their candidate. Cunningham is Leader of Reform Party London.

Boxer Derek Chisora was previously mentioned as a potential candidate.

=== Liberal Democrats ===
In September 2026, Sarah Olney, MP for Richmond Park and a Liberal Democrat spokesperson, announced she would seek to be the Liberal Democrats' candidate.

=== Other potential candidates ===
Anthony Middleton, a TV presenter and former soldier, had initially put himself forward to be a Reform candidate. However, in August 2025, it was reported that he would instead stand as an independent.

Fiona Lali of the Revolutionary Communist Party (British section of the Revolutionary Communist International) declared her intention to stand in November 2026. A communist, anti-racism, and Palestine solidarity activist, Lali previously stood as a candidate in Stratford and Bow at the 2024 general election.

It has been reported that actor James Corden is considering standing for mayor. He is thought to be a Labour supporter.

Thomas Skinner, a businessman and TV personality, is a potential candidate and was approached by three political parties, according to The Telegraph.

Russell Brand, a comedian, said on The Tucker Carlson Show he "would like to run" for Mayor of London in 2028. However, he was sentenced to over 10 years in prison in November 2026.

== Opinion polls ==
=== With generic party candidates ===
These polls have been conducted before candidate details were finalised, so respondents are asked which party's candidate they would vote for.

==== With preferences ====
| Date(s) conducted | Pollster | Client | Sample size | Preference | Lab | Con | LD | Grn | Ref | Others | Lead |
|---|---|---|---|---|---|---|---|---|---|---|---|
| 10–17 Jul 2026 | Opinium | Festus Akinbusoye | 2,021 | First | 32% | 17% | 10% | 18% | 17% | 5% | 14 |
| 10–17 Jul 2026 | Opinium | Festus Akinbusoye | 2,021 | Second (Note: Percentages recalculated from source figures, excluding those replying "Don't know" and "Would not vote".) | 16% | 17% | 20% | 18% | 12% | 18% | 2 |
| 2 May 2024 | 2024 mayoral election | | – | N/A | 43.8% | 32.7% | 5.8% | 5.8% | 3.2% | 8.6% | 11.1 |

==== With no preferences ====
| Date(s) conducted | Pollster | Client | Sample size | Lab | Con | LD | Grn | Ref | Others | Lead |
|---|---|---|---|---|---|---|---|---|---|---|
| 30 Jun – 8 Jul 2026 | Savanta | QMUL | 1,038 | 33% | 18% | 9% | 17% | 18% | 6% | 15 |
| 17–23 Dec 2025 | Savanta | QMUL | 1,006 | 32% | 20% | 11% | 13% | 19% | 5% | 12 |
| 29 Apr – 21 May 2025 | Savanta | QMUL | 1,003 | 35% | 23% | 14% | 11% | 14% | 3% | 12 |
| 4–8 May 2025 | Find Out Now | Alex Wilson | 1,102 | 33% | 20% | 10% | 13% | 20% | 4% | 13 |
| 30 Oct – 11 Nov 2024 | Savanta | QMUL | 1,004 | 35% | 26% | 11% | 11% | 13% | 4% | 9 |
| 2 May 2024 | 2024 mayoral election | | – | 43.8% | 32.7% | 5.8% | 5.8% | 3.2% | 8.6% | 11.1 |
