= Kathryn Holloway =

Kathryn Holloway (or variants) may refer to:

- Kathryn Holloway (volleyball)
- Kathryn Holloway (police commissioner), British police commissioner and radio and television presenter
- Kathryn Holloway (politician), see Trinity—Spadina (provincial electoral district)
- Katherine Holloway, Door to Door character played by Jane Kaczmarek
