= Abbey Road (ward) =

Electoral ward in the City of Westminster, England

- Electoral ward for the Westminster City Council
- Abbey Road ward boundaries since 2022
- Borough: Westminster
- County: Greater London
- Population: 13,043 (2021) (Note: 2021 Census data reported for 2022 ward boundaries)
- Electorate: 7,803 (2022)
- Major settlements: St John's Wood
- Area: 1.149 square kilometres (0.444 sq mi)

Current electoral ward
- Created: 2002
- Number of members: 3
- Councillors: Caroline Sargent; Hannah Galley; Festus Akinbusoye
- GSS code: E05000630 (2002–2022); E05013792 (2022–present)

Abbey Road is an electoral ward in the City of Westminster. The ward was first used in the 2002 elections. It returns three councillors to Westminster City Council.

== List of councillors ==
Term	Councillor	Party
2002–2022	Judith Warner	Conservative
2002–2014	Cyril Nemeth	Conservative
2002–2007	Kevin Gardner	Conservative
2007–2022	Lindsey Hall	Conservative
2014–2022	Peter Freeman	Conservative
2022–2024	Amanda Langford	Conservative
2022–present	Caroline Sargent	Conservative
2022–2026	Alan Mendoza (Note: Alan Mendoza changed parties in 2025)	Conservative
2022–2026	Alan Mendoza	Reform
2024–present	Hannah Galley	Conservative
2026–present	Festus Akinbusoye	Conservative

== Westminster council elections since 2022 ==
There was a revision of ward boundaries in Westminster in 2022. There was an exchange of territory with Regent's Park ward.

=== 2026 election ===
The election took place on 7 May 2026.

2026 Westminster City Council election: Abbey Road
Party	Candidate	Votes	%	±%
Conservative	Hannah Galley	1,297	44.2	−6.4
Conservative	Festus Akinbusoye	1,284	43.8	−5.1
Conservative	Caroline Sargent	1,282	43.7	−4.9
Reform	Alan Mendoza	567	19.3	N/A
Labour	Ruth Sullivan	510	17.4	−15.3
Labour	Asmahan Alnidawi	494	16.8	−14.6
Reform	Damien Moore	462	15.8	N/A
Labour	Belin Munshi	456	15.6	−13.0
Reform	Anika Sweetland	413	14.1	N/A
Green	Themistoklis Pagoudis	411	14.0	+1.3
Green	Esme Webb	358	12.2	N/A
Green	Joseph Elliott	351	12.0	N/A
Liberal Democrats	Peter Dixon	266	9.1	−5.9
Liberal Democrats	Peter Toeman	220	7.5	−1.9
Liberal Democrats	Hussain Murad	184	6.3	−2.0
Majority		715	24.4	+8.5
Turnout		2,932	38.1	+6.5
Conservative hold		Swing		
Conservative hold		Swing		
Conservative hold		Swing		

=== 2024 by-election ===
The by-election on 4 July 2024 took place on the same day as the United Kingdom general election. It followed the resignation of Amanda Langford.

2024 Abbey Road by-election
Party	Candidate	Votes	%	±%
Conservative	Hannah Galley	1,852	43.9	
Labour	Alexander Burgess	1,344	31.9	
Liberal Democrats	Toeman Helen	560	13.3	
Green	Rajiv Sinha	459	10.9	
Turnout		4,255	52.16	+20.58
Conservative hold		Swing		

=== 2022 election ===
The election took place on 5 May 2022.

2022 Westminster City Council election: Abbey Road
Party	Candidate	Votes	%	±%
Conservative	Amanda Langford	1,241	50.6	
Conservative	Caroline Sargent	1,199	48.9	
Conservative	Alan Mendoza	1,193	48.6	
Labour	Sarah Hanson	803	32.7	
Labour	James Evans	770	31.4	
Labour	Sheyda Monshizadeh-Azar	702	28.6	
Liberal Democrats	Trish Griffiths	367	15.0	
Green	Cristian Dinu	311	12.7	
Liberal Democrats	Christopher Gunness	231	9.4	
Liberal Democrats	Seth Weisz	204	8.3	
Turnout		2,454	31.58	
Conservative win (new boundaries)				
Conservative win (new boundaries)				
Conservative win (new boundaries)				

== 2002–2022 Westminster council elections ==
Abbey Road ward boundaries from 2002 to 2022

=== 2018 election ===
The election took place on 3 May 2018.

2018 Westminster City Council election: Abbey Road
Party	Candidate	Votes	%	±%
Conservative	Lindsey Hall	1,542	65.2	+1.7
Conservative	Peter Freeman	1,503	63.6	+1.6
Conservative	Judith Warner	1,480	62.6	+0.5
Labour	Phillida Inman	480	20.3	−3.9
Labour	Sam Gardner	479	20.3	−1.0
Labour	Connor Jones	402	17.0	−0.9
Liberal Democrats	Helen Davies	294	12.4	+1.4
Green	Emmanuelle Tandy	212	9.0	−4.2
Liberal Democrats	Seth Weisz	203	8.6	N/A
Liberal Democrats	Peter Toeman	193	8.2	N/A
Majority		1000	42.3	
Turnout		6788	37.0	+6.1
Conservative hold		Swing		
Conservative hold		Swing		
Conservative hold		Swing		

=== 2014 election ===
The election took place on 22 May 2014.

2014 Westminster City Council election: Abbey Road
Party	Candidate	Votes	%	±%
Conservative	Lindsey Hall	1,277	63.5	
Conservative	Judith Warner	1,248	62.1	
Conservative	Peter Freeman	1,247	62.0	
Labour	Katharine Hoskyns	487	24.2	
Labour	Peter Denton	429	21.3	
Labour	Angelo Sommariva	359	17.9	
Green	Emmanuelle Tandy	265	13.2	
Liberal Democrats	Tilly Boulter	221	11.0	
Majority		760	37.8	
Turnout		5533	30.9	−25.3
Conservative hold		Swing		
Conservative hold		Swing		
Conservative hold		Swing		

=== 2010 election ===
The election on 6 May 2010 took place on the same day as the United Kingdom general election.

2010 Westminster City Council election: Abbey Road
Party	Candidate	Votes	%	±%
Conservative	Lindsey Hall	2,533		
Conservative	Judith Warner	2,361		
Conservative	Cyril Nemeth	2,357		
Labour	Katharine Hoskyns	855		
Labour	Patrick Griffin	847		
Labour	Margherita Rendel	735		
Liberal Democrats	Kathleen Hobbins	652		
Liberal Democrats	Sophia Service	548		
Green	Ludovic Hunter-Tilney	436		
Turnout				
Conservative hold		Swing		
Conservative hold		Swing		
Conservative hold		Swing		

=== 2007 by-election ===
The by-election took place on 3 May 2007, following the death of Kevin Gardner.

2007 Abbey Road by-election
Party	Candidate	Votes	%	±%
Conservative	Lindsey Hall	1,334	65.2	−3.7
Liberal Democrats	Mark Blackburn	355	17.3	+1.3
Labour	Alon Or-Bach	280	13.7	−1.4
Independent	Alberto Lidji	78	3.8	+3.8
Majority		979	47.9	
Turnout		2,047		
Conservative hold		Swing		

=== 2006 election ===
The election took place on 4 May 2006.

2006 Westminster City Council election: Abbey Road
Party	Candidate	Votes	%	±%
Conservative	Judith Warner	1,490	68.9	
Conservative	Cyril Nemeth	1,483		
Conservative	Kevin Gardner	1,456		
Liberal Democrats	Robert Bell	345	16.0	
Liberal Democrats	Elizabeth Wheeler	330		
Labour	Katharine Hoskyns	326	15.1	
Labour	Margherita Rendel	306		
Labour	Patrick Griffin	302		
Liberal Democrats	Gareth Evans	281		
Turnout			30.9	
Conservative hold		Swing		
Conservative hold		Swing		
Conservative hold		Swing		

=== 2002 election ===
The election took place on 2 May 2002.

2002 Westminster City Council election: Abbey Road
Party	Candidate	Votes	%	±%
Conservative	Judith Warner	1,269	55.85	New
Conservative	Cyril Nemeth	1,265		
Conservative	Kevin Gardner	1,230		
Labour	Katharine Hoskyns	338	14.20	New
Labour	Phillida Inman	313		
Liberal Democrats	Robert Bell	308	13.71	New
Labour	Margherita Rendel	306		
Independent	Elizabeth Maxwell	217	9.66	New
Independent	Michele Staniland	148	6.59	New
Registered electors		6,872		New
Turnout		1,901	27.66	New
Rejected ballots		7	0.37	New
Conservative win (new seat)				
Conservative win (new seat)				
Conservative win (new seat)				
