= Laila Cunningham =

British politician and former prosecutor

Westminster City Councillor for Lancaster Gate
- In office 5 May 2022 – 7 May 2026

Personal details
- Born: Laila Ahmed El-Meleigy; August 1977 (age 49) Paddington, London, England
- Party: Reform UK (since 2025)
- Other political affiliations: Conservative (until 2025)
- Spouses: Philippe Dupuy (m. 2004; div. 2014); Michael Cunningham (m. 2018)
- Children: 7
- Education: Lycée Français Charles de Gaulle
- Alma mater: California State University, Long Beach
- Occupation: Politician; lawyer

Laila Ahmed Cunningham (née El-Meleigy, previously Dupuy; born August 1977) is a British politician and former Crown Prosecution Service (CPS) prosecutor. She was elected to Westminster City Council in 2022 for the Conservative Party and defected to Reform UK in June 2025. In January 2026, Cunningham was announced as Reform UK's candidate at the 2028 London mayoral election.

== Early life ==
Cunningham was born in August 1977 in Paddington, London to Egyptian Muslim parents who had emigrated to the United Kingdom in the 1960s. Cunningham said that Egypt was nearly "communist" at the time, being under the rule of Gamal Abdel Nasser and his National Union.

She grew up in Kilburn in London, as one of five children. She was educated at the Lycée Français Charles de Gaulle in South Kensington, a private school that teaches the French curriculum. At secondary school, she took a keen interest in basketball – particularly due to her height (she was 5ft 11 when she was aged 11). She was part of the team representing South East England, and played in the London Youth Games. She trained at the Centre of Excellence for Basketball in Europe, and also played in California while studying at California State University, Long Beach.

Before entering politics, she was a lawyer for the Crown Prosecution Service (CPS).

== Political career ==
=== Conservative Party ===
Cunningham said that her mother was a supporter of the Conservative Party and despised trade union leader Arthur Scargill. Cunningham herself admired Margaret Thatcher.

Cunningham stood in the Queen's Park ward in the 2018 Westminster City Council election, in which all three seats were won by Labour. In 2022, she stood in the Lancaster Gate ward and was elected. In the 2024 London Assembly election, she was on the London-wide Conservative list, and was not elected.

In the 2024 general election, Cunningham was due to be the Conservative candidate in Rotherham. She withdrew "due to a change in circumstances", meaning the party did not contest the seat. Excluding the convention not to stand candidates in the constituency of the incumbent Speaker of the House of Commons, it was the only constituency in England, Scotland or Wales where the Conservatives did not stand.

=== Reform UK ===
Cunningham defected to Reform UK in June 2025. She said the Conservatives had "let the country down" on issues such as taxation and immigration. The leader of the Conservatives on the council, Paul Swaddle, said that Cunningham had frequently been late or absent and had lost their trust since the Rotherham decision; she denied the allegations.

Due to making political remarks to The Standard whilst still a CPS prosecutor in June 2025, Cunningham drew controversy as prosecuting lawyers are expected to not take part in "any political or public activity which compromises, or might be seen to compromise, their impartial service to the Government of the day or any future Government." This led to her resignation from the CPS, which was immediately accepted; she would likely have faced disciplinary process if she had not resigned.

After defecting, Cunningham was mentioned by BBC News, The Daily Telegraph and The Times as being a potential Reform UK candidate for mayor of London in 2028. She criticised incumbent Sadiq Khan over knife crime in London.

In August 2025, Cunningham was one of the launchers of Women for Reform, alongside Mayor of Greater Lincolnshire Andrea Jenkyns, Sarah Pochin MP, and leader of Kent County Council Linden Kemkaran.

On 7 January 2026, Cunningham was announced as the Reform candidate for the 2028 London mayoral election. Cunningham proposed giving priority in social housing to British citizens, and abolishing the Ultra Low Emission Zone. Having been criticised by some on the right for having attended a Pride parade, Cunningham said "I've always been very pro gay rights, and I'll always march for that." In February 2026, after former Reform UK MP Rupert Lowe established Restore Britain, Cunningham described the party as "neo-Nazi". Lowe responded by stating that he had consulted his legal team and called on Cunningham to issue an apology and full retraction. In response to her remarks, Elon Musk, who had endorsed Restore Britain, accused Reform UK of wanting "race extinction".

She did not stand for re-election in the 2026 Westminster City Council election.

== Personal life ==
Cunningham is a mother of seven children. She had four children from a ten-year marriage to Frenchman Philippe Dupuy, which ended in divorce when he left her for a woman in Dubai.

After her divorce, Cunningham undertook freelance legal work, before setting up an app called Kitchin Table for self-employed women to set up working groups in their homes. She moved to Los Angeles to set up the app in 2018. That same year, she married American tech investor Michael Cunningham, with whom she has another son. She also raised his two existing children and thus considers herself to be a mother of seven.

She had a sister who died of cancer around 2022.

While Cunningham identifies as a Muslim, she has stated that she does not pray or fast during Ramadan.

== See also ==
- List of Conservative Party defections to Reform UK
