= Colette Paul =

UK police officer

Colette Paul QPM is a Police Officer of the United Kingdom. She was the Chief Constable of Bedfordshire Police.

== Chief Constable of Bedfordshire ==
Paul was appointed as Chief Constable of Bedfordshire Police by the Police and Crime Commissioner, Olly Martins, in May 2013. Her predecessor was appointed to lead the Ministry of Defence Police. Paul was previously the Deputy Chief Constable of South Wales Police and served the majority of her career in the Metropolitan Police. In June 2015 she announced that she would be taking early retirement.

Police appointments
Preceded by Alf Hitchcock	Chief Constable of Bedfordshire Police; 2013–2015	Succeeded by Jon Boutcher
