= 2026 Westminster City Council election =

2026 English local government election

- 7 May 2026

All 54 seats to Westminster City Council 28 seats needed for a majority
- Registered: 130,603
- Turnout: 46,962; 36.0%
	First party	Second party
Leader	Paul Swaddle	Adam Hug
Party	Conservative	Labour
Last election	23 seats, 38.6%	31 seats, 46.3%
Seats before	24	28
Seats after	32	22
Seat change	▲9	▼9
Popular vote	47,619	40,986
Percentage	35.1%	30.2%
Swing	▼3.5pp	▼16.1pp
- Map of the results of the 2026 Westminster council election. Conservatives in blue and Labour in red. Striped wards have mixed representation.
Leader before election
Adam Hug
Labour
Leader after election
Paul Swaddle
Conservative

The 2026 Westminster City Council election took place on 7 May 2026, as part of the 2026 United Kingdom local elections. All 54 members of Westminster City Council were elected. The election took place alongside local elections in the other London boroughs.

Prior to the election, the council was under Labour majority control; they had won a majority at the previous election in 2022 which had been the first time since the modern council was created in 1965 that it had not been controlled by the Conservatives. At this election, the Conservatives retook control of the council, winning 32 of the 54 seats. The Conservative group leader, Paul Swaddle, was formally appointed as the new leader of the council at the subsequent annual council meeting on 20 May 2026.

== History ==
The thirty-two London boroughs were established in 1965 by the London Government Act 1963. They are the principal authorities in Greater London and have responsibilities including education, housing, planning, highways, social services, libraries, recreation, waste, environmental health and revenue collection. Some of the powers are shared with the Greater London Authority, which also manages passenger transport, police and fire.

Since formation, Westminster City Council was run by the Conservative Party until the 2022 election, which marked both the first ever Labour administration of Westminster and the first ever non-Conservative administration.

== Changes since 2022 ==
By elections in West End ward in September 2024 and Vincent Square ward in February 2025 both resulted in Conservative gains from Labour, reducing Labour's council group to 28 seats.

Two Conservative councillors, Laila Cunningham in Lancaster Gate Ward and Alan Mendoza in Abbey Road ward, defected to Reform UK in June 2025 and November 2025 respectively.

After 2022 election		Before 2026 election		After 2026 election	
Party	Seats	Party	Seats	Party	Seats
Labour	31	Labour	28	Labour	22
Conservative	23	Conservative	24	Conservative	32
Reform	0	Reform	2	Reform	0

== Results summary ==
2026 Westminster City Council election
Party	Seats	Gains	Losses	Net gain/loss	Seats %	Votes %	Votes	+/−
Conservative	32	9	0	▲9	59.3	35.1	47,619	▼3.5
Labour	22	0	9	▼9	40.7	30.2	40,986	▼16.1
Green	0	0	0	Steady	0.0	17.7	24,105	▲15.6
Reform	0	0	0		0.0	10.8	14,610	N/A
Liberal Democrats	0	0	0	Steady	0.0	6.2	8,389	▼6.5
Independent	0	0	0	Steady	0.0	0.0	57	▼0.3
Workers Party	0	0	0		0.0	0.0	54	N/A

== Ward results ==
The following are the candidate-level results for the 7 May 2026 election. Vote shares and the majority figures are calculated on ballot papers counted, and the change column compares each candidate to the same-rank candidate of their party in the 2022 election, which was held under the same ward boundaries. Candidates of parties that did not contest the ward in 2022, or that fielded fewer candidates than in 2026, are marked N/A. Sitting councillors seeking re-election in their existing ward are marked with an asterisk (*); councillors seeking re-election for a different ward are marked with a cross (†). Three sitting Conservative councillors had changed party affiliation between the 2022 and 2026 elections: Alan Mendoza (Abbey Road) and Laila Cunningham (Lancaster Gate, the latter not seeking re-election in 2026) defected to Reform UK, while West End councillor Paul Fisher, who had been elected for Labour in 2022, defected to the Conservatives before the election.

=== Abbey Road ===
Abbey Road (3)
Party	Candidate	Votes	%	±%
Conservative	Hannah Galley *	1,297	44.2	−6.4
Conservative	Festus Akinbusoye	1,284	43.8	−5.1
Conservative	Caroline Sargent *	1,282	43.7	−4.9
Reform	Alan Mendoza *	567	19.3	N/A
Labour	Ruth Sullivan	510	17.4	−15.3
Labour	Asmahan Alnidawi	494	16.8	−14.6
Reform	Damien Moore	462	15.8	N/A
Labour	Belin Munshi	456	15.6	−13.0
Reform	Anika Sweetland	413	14.1	N/A
Green	Themistoklis Pagoudis	411	14.0	+1.3
Green	Esme Webb	358	12.2	N/A
Green	Joseph Elliott	351	12.0	N/A
Liberal Democrats	Peter Dixon	266	9.1	−5.9
Liberal Democrats	Peter Toeman	220	7.5	−1.9
Liberal Democrats	Hussain Murad	184	6.3	−2.0
Majority		715	24.4	+8.5
Turnout		2,932	38.1	+6.5
Conservative hold				
Conservative hold				
Conservative hold				

=== Bayswater ===
Bayswater (3)
Party	Candidate	Votes	%	±%
Conservative	Christabel Flight	1,016	38.2	+4.4
Labour	Maggie Carman *	1,009	37.9	−22.2
Conservative	Mark Tozer	942	35.4	+2.9
Conservative	Emily Sheffield	921	34.6	+5.2
Labour	Max Sullivan *	870	32.7	−22.3
Labour	Tim Nolan	859	32.3	−22.5
Green	Chris Darby	373	14.0	N/A
Green	Jessie Khera	360	13.5	N/A
Green	Mikias Desta	348	13.1	N/A
Reform	John Bornholt	238	8.9	N/A
Reform	Patrick Dougherty	215	8.1	N/A
Reform	Sukumar Srinivasan	184	6.9	N/A
Liberal Democrats	George Coelho	179	6.7	−3.6
Liberal Democrats	Alasdair Murray	139	5.2	−4.7
Liberal Democrats	Stephen Gomersall	136	5.1	−3.0
Majority		21	0.8	−20.2
Turnout		2,662	35.7	+1.9
Conservative gain from Labour				
Labour hold				
Conservative gain from Labour				

=== Church Street ===
Church Street (3)
Party	Candidate	Votes	%	±%
Labour	Aicha Less *	891	41.7	−28.9
Labour	Fiona Parker	842	39.4	−28.3
Labour	Abdul Toki *	829	38.8	−27.3
Green	Yassin Mahi Eldein	614	28.7	N/A
Green	Zubin Cramsie	595	27.8	N/A
Green	Nelson Nash	529	24.7	N/A
Conservative	Ahmed Imtiaz	274	12.8	−6.0
Conservative	Natalia Awasty	273	12.8	−4.4
Conservative	Magdalena Krzyzanowska	245	11.5	−5.2
Reform	Margot Finley	232	10.9	N/A
Reform	Calum Miller	224	10.5	N/A
Reform	David Morrall	218	10.2	N/A
Liberal Democrats	Kirsty Allan	142	6.6	−1.2
Liberal Democrats	Sarah Ryan	100	4.7	−3.0
Majority		215	10.1	−37.2
Turnout		2,138	29.8	+3.9
Labour hold				
Labour hold				
Labour hold				

=== Harrow Road ===
Harrow Road (3)
Party	Candidate	Votes	%	±%
Labour	Concia Albert *	1,038	40.8	−31.9
Labour	Regan Hook *	944	37.1	−34.1
Labour	Rhys Thomas	909	35.7	−33.2
Green	Charlie Button	893	35.1	N/A
Green	Ilemi Arrindell	884	34.7	N/A
Green	Faaiz Hasan	862	33.9	N/A
Conservative	Alexander Hawthorn	310	12.2	−6.0
Conservative	Samuel Parr	272	10.7	−6.6
Conservative	Iheoma Oteh	267	10.5	−5.2
Reform	Lars Agren	223	8.8	N/A
Reform	Alex Hayter	212	8.3	N/A
Reform	Lazar Petrovic	200	7.9	N/A
Liberal Democrats	David Ewen	129	5.1	−5.4
Liberal Democrats	Diane Yeo	125	4.9	−3.6
Workers Party	Momosi Umolu	54	2.1	N/A
Majority		16	0.6	−50.1
Turnout		2,544	33.9	+6.2
Labour hold				
Labour hold				
Labour hold				

=== Hyde Park ===
Hyde Park (3)
Party	Candidate	Votes	%	±%
Conservative	Elliot Keck	856	40.7	−1.4
Conservative	Greg Ero	816	38.8	−0.6
Labour	Md Shamsed Chowdhury *	800	38.0	−6.7
Conservative	Arran Wedderburn	760	36.1	−0.5
Labour	Judith Southern *	719	34.2	−9.2
Labour	Nigel Medforth	654	31.1	−11.9
Green	Niki Moosavi	313	14.9	N/A
Green	Jenny Turton	253	12.0	N/A
Green	Koye Candide-Johnson	246	11.7	N/A
Reform	Robert Midgley	138	6.6	N/A
Reform	Stewart Robbins	133	6.3	N/A
Reform	Plamen Popgenski	124	5.9	N/A
Liberal Democrats	Jean Cenejuste	108	5.1	−8.7
Liberal Democrats	William Dunbar	100	4.8	−8.5
Majority		40	1.9	+1.0
Turnout		2,104	36.5	+7.0
Conservative gain from Labour				
Conservative gain from Labour				
Labour hold				

=== Knightsbridge and Belgravia ===
Knightsbridge and Belgravia (3)
Party	Candidate	Votes	%	±%
Conservative	Tony Devenish *	1,097	50.5	−12.2
Conservative	Elizabeth Hitchcock *	1,091	50.2	−11.6
Conservative	Rachael Robathan *	1,091	50.2	−11.5
Reform	Cass Cass-Horne	355	16.3	N/A
Reform	Henry Platt	352	16.2	N/A
Reform	Anthony Goodwin	333	15.3	N/A
Labour	Jo Broadey	325	15.0	−9.1
Labour	Matt Noble †	299	13.8	−8.0
Green	Paul Pettinger	286	13.2	N/A
Labour	Max Murashov	261	12.0	−9.4
Green	Brigitte Stepputtis	257	11.8	N/A
Green	Rowan Bazley	252	11.6	N/A
Liberal Democrats	Robert Beattie	163	7.5	−9.8
Liberal Democrats	Kathryn Kerle	157	7.2	−6.7
Majority		736	33.9	−3.7
Turnout		2,173	33.3	+4.1
Conservative hold				
Conservative hold				
Conservative hold				

=== Lancaster Gate ===
Lancaster Gate (3)
Party	Candidate	Votes	%	±%
Labour	Ellie Ormsby *	989	38.9	−3.1
Labour	Connor Jones	936	36.9	−4.9
Conservative	Philip Stephenson-Oliver	862	33.9	−10.2
Labour	Jenneba Sie-Jalloh	844	33.2	−7.8
Conservative	Jonathan Goff	843	33.2	−8.6
Conservative	Blessings Kaseke	825	32.5	−6.4
Green	JD Kelleher	381	15.0	+3.0
Green	Matthew Bishop	367	14.4	N/A
Green	Sandra Goncalves	326	12.8	N/A
Reform	Sir David Roche	271	10.7	N/A
Reform	Ayesha Ghulati	239	9.4	N/A
Reform	Rudy Vandaele-Kennedy	229	9.0	N/A
Liberal Democrats	Richard Pyatt	141	5.6	−7.1
Liberal Democrats	Richard Wood	141	5.6	−1.6
Majority		18	0.7	+0.7
Turnout		2,540	37.6	+1.8
Labour hold				
Labour hold				
Conservative hold				

=== Little Venice ===
Little Venice (3)
Party	Candidate	Votes	%	±%
Conservative	Melvyn Caplan *	1,215	43.9	−2.3
Conservative	Lorraine Dean *	1,170	42.2	−3.8
Conservative	Louise Shaw	1,071	38.7	−5.4
Labour	Sara Hassan *	935	33.8	−11.0
Labour	Shad Hoshyar	844	30.5	−12.9
Labour	Megan Schellinger	838	30.3	−12.4
Green	Aliza Mallal	368	13.3	N/A
Green	Phil Dobson	366	13.2	N/A
Green	Ted Loveday	355	12.8	N/A
Reform	Jane Britton	187	6.8	N/A
Reform	Dean Johnson	174	6.3	N/A
Reform	Rachel Ward	171	6.2	N/A
Liberal Democrats	Edward Braune	127	4.6	−4.8
Liberal Democrats	Bahram Alimoradian	120	4.3	−3.6
Liberal Democrats	Marianne Magnin	120	4.3	−2.2
Majority		136	4.9	+4.2
Turnout		2,770	41.7	+4.1
Conservative hold				
Conservative hold				
Conservative gain from Labour				

=== Maida Vale ===
Maida Vale (3)
Party	Candidate	Votes	%	±%
Labour	Geoff Barraclough *	1,008	40.5	−22.0
Labour	Nafsika Butler-Thalassis *	957	38.5	−21.7
Labour	Iman Less *	885	35.6	−19.9
Conservative	Anthony Garnham	578	23.2	−9.6
Conservative	Jake Glasmacher	577	23.2	−5.1
Conservative	Daniel Kawczynski	514	20.7	−6.4
Green	Rachel Allen	514	20.7	N/A
Green	Anissa Boussekhane	491	19.7	N/A
Green	Eoghan Butler	424	17.0	N/A
Reform	Mark Allcock	316	12.7	N/A
Reform	Maria Ensabella	285	11.5	N/A
Reform	Lois Miller	272	10.9	N/A
Liberal Democrats	Olivia Griscelli	184	7.4	−2.3
Liberal Democrats	Ian Newton	154	6.2	−0.4
Liberal Democrats	Max Pearson	88	3.5	−2.0
Majority		307	12.3	−10.4
Turnout		2,487	32.9	−1.1
Labour hold				
Labour hold				
Labour hold				

=== Marylebone ===
Marylebone (3)
Party	Candidate	Votes	%	±%
Conservative	Ian Rowley *	1,188	42.8	−2.8
Conservative	Karen Scarborough *	1,173	42.3	−2.1
Conservative	Barbara Arzymanow *	1,171	42.2	−1.8
Liberal Democrats	Alistair Barr	722	26.0	−7.3
Liberal Democrats	Martin Kersh	627	22.6	−7.6
Liberal Democrats	Helen Toeman	616	22.2	−2.6
Labour	Lara Chammas	381	13.7	−8.7
Labour	Abdulla Al-Hashimi	351	12.6	−9.7
Green	Chris Hill	305	11.0	N/A
Labour	Mustafa Ghafouri	303	10.9	−10.1
Reform	Alex Archer	303	10.9	N/A
Reform	Linda Crawford	300	10.8	N/A
Reform	Simon Gallier	266	9.6	N/A
Green	James Richardson	227	8.2	N/A
Green	Adam Workman	194	7.0	N/A
Majority		449	16.2	+5.5
Turnout		2,775	35.5	+3.4
Conservative hold				
Conservative hold				
Conservative hold				

=== Pimlico North ===
Pimlico North (3)
Party	Candidate	Votes	%	±%
Conservative	Jim Glen *	1,357	45.7	−4.2
Conservative	Ed Pitt Ford *	1,350	45.5	−2.9
Conservative	Mohamed Elmi	1,193	40.2	−5.9
Labour	Emma Garside	713	24.0	−13.4
Labour	Shamsa Hersi	622	21.0	−16.3
Labour	Mohamed Radwan	553	18.6	−13.6
Green	Bella Arraiol	459	15.5	N/A
Green	Joao Arraiol	394	13.3	N/A
Reform	Mike Hollingsworth	359	12.1	N/A
Green	Bertie King	351	11.8	N/A
Reform	Amanda Wilkinson	349	11.8	N/A
Reform	David Roach	343	11.6	N/A
Liberal Democrats	Anthony Coleman	270	9.1	−8.3
Liberal Democrats	Guy Palmer	174	5.9	−8.0
Liberal Democrats	Omar Hegazi	173	5.8	N/A
Majority		480	16.2	+7.5
Turnout		2,968	38.8	+3.9
Conservative hold				
Conservative hold				
Conservative hold				

=== Pimlico South ===
Pimlico South (3)
Party	Candidate	Votes	%	±%
Labour	Liza Begum *	1,273	39.6	−9.9
Labour	Robert Eagleton *	1,169	36.4	−10.2
Labour	Jason Williams *	1,075	33.5	−10.6
Conservative	Roberto Salvia	1,033	32.2	−9.3
Conservative	James Spencer	1,030	32.1	−9.3
Conservative	Murad Gassanly	1,025	31.9	−9.0
Green	Matthew Devers	459	14.3	N/A
Reform	Henry Hunt	396	12.3	N/A
Green	Benedict Fletcher	371	11.6	N/A
Reform	Nick Lockett	371	11.6	N/A
Reform	Claudia Mallon	363	11.3	N/A
Green	Eva Sheffield	346	10.8	N/A
Liberal Democrats	Theodore Roos	145	4.5	−3.7
Liberal Democrats	Yaghi Raked	120	3.7	−3.4
Majority		42	1.3	−1.3
Turnout		3,211	45.2	+4.0
Labour hold				
Labour hold				
Labour hold				

=== Queen's Park ===
Queen's Park (3)
Party	Candidate	Votes	%	±%
Labour	Patricia McAllister *	1,218	43.0	−33.6
Labour	Cara Sanquest *	1,074	37.9	−33.1
Labour	Hamza Taouzzale *	1,034	36.5	−32.5
Green	Clarissa Astor	892	31.5	N/A
Green	Tom Oakley	772	27.2	N/A
Green	Rajiv Sinha	716	25.3	N/A
Conservative	Antony Demetriou	319	11.3	−5.9
Reform	Felix Gilroy	317	11.2	N/A
Conservative	Richard Pinchen	303	10.7	−4.4
Reform	Avril O'Connor	296	10.4	N/A
Reform	Graeme Kalbraier	274	9.7	N/A
Conservative	Annabel Singh	243	8.6	−5.7
Liberal Democrats	Oliver Harrison	206	7.3	−1.3
Liberal Democrats	Gillian Scallan	147	5.2	−1.3
Liberal Democrats	Esther McGee	135	4.8	−0.3
Majority		142	5.0	−46.8
Turnout		2,834	33.4	+6.8
Labour hold				
Labour hold				
Labour hold				

=== Regent's Park ===
Regent's Park (3)
Party	Candidate	Votes	%	±%
Conservative	Robert Rigby *	1,322	49.8	−1.5
Conservative	Paul Swaddle *	1,256	47.3	−2.1
Conservative	Ralu Oteh-Osoka *	1,208	45.5	−2.2
Labour	Zaynab Ali	500	18.8	−12.5
Labour	Connor Whittam	499	18.8	−12.0
Labour	Safia Yousef	461	17.4	−12.0
Green	Vivien Lichtenstein	420	15.8	+1.6
Green	William Watson	364	13.7	N/A
Green	Wilf Parsons	361	13.6	N/A
Reform	Alexander Smith	301	11.3	N/A
Reform	Adam Amer	300	11.3	N/A
Reform	Roger Gewolb	286	10.8	N/A
Liberal Democrats	Dominic Aubrey-Jones	223	8.4	−5.5
Liberal Democrats	Adam Bennett	147	5.5	−3.7
Majority		708	26.7	+10.3
Turnout		2,654	35.4	+5.7
Conservative hold				
Conservative hold				
Conservative hold				

=== St James's ===
St James's (3)
Party	Candidate	Votes	%	±%
Conservative	Tim Mitchell *	1,035	44.9	−3.1
Conservative	Mark Shearer *	997	43.3	−4.0
Conservative	San Abishev	974	42.3	−4.4
Labour	Samira Richardson	495	21.5	−17.2
Labour	Hannah Turnbull	484	21.0	−13.3
Labour	Ammar Yusuf	406	17.6	−16.7
Green	Maria Dowell	387	16.8	N/A
Green	Sam Graham	354	15.4	N/A
Green	Mike Walker	324	14.1	N/A
Reform	Samuel Harwood	285	12.4	N/A
Reform	Roger Walters	266	11.6	N/A
Reform	Elke Sweetland	248	10.8	N/A
Liberal Democrats	Moreland Agnew	177	7.7	−6.8
Liberal Democrats	Nigel Stokes	144	6.3	−7.5
Liberal Democrats	Isabelle Pucher	134	5.8	−8.0
Majority		479	20.8	+12.8
Turnout		2,303	33.8	+4.2
Conservative hold				
Conservative hold				
Conservative hold				

=== Vincent Square ===
Vincent Square (3)
Party	Candidate	Votes	%	±%
Conservative	David Harvey *	1,405	47.1	+0.8
Conservative	Selina Short *	1,377	46.2	+2.4
Conservative	Ben Sewell	1,326	44.5	+0.9
Labour	Patrick Brown	759	25.5	−19.0
Labour	Joanna Camadoo-Rothwell	747	25.1	−16.3
Labour	Shakira Noel	670	22.5	−16.3
Green	Louis Mylne	386	12.9	N/A
Green	Daniel O'Shaughnessy	366	12.3	N/A
Green	Amel Serour	345	11.6	N/A
Reform	Andrew Little	265	8.9	N/A
Reform	Evan McNamara	244	8.2	N/A
Reform	Arnaud Corbin	241	8.1	N/A
Liberal Democrats	Paul Diggory	173	5.8	−6.7
Liberal Democrats	Olivia Brink	166	5.6	−3.5
Liberal Democrats	Phillip Kerle	158	5.3	−3.7
Independent	Chi Usanga	57	1.9	N/A
Majority		567	19.0	+18.8
Turnout		2,981	40.2	+1.0
Conservative hold				
Conservative hold				
Conservative gain from Labour				

=== West End ===
West End (3)
Party	Candidate	Votes	%	±%
Conservative	Tim Barnes *	954	40.3	−0.6
Conservative	Elizabeth Amos	916	38.6	−0.7
Conservative	Paul Fisher *	857	36.2	−2.7
Labour	Patrick Lilley *	722	30.5	−18.8
Labour	Sarah Littleton	681	28.7	−18.6
Labour	Tim Lord	681	28.7	−18.6
Green	Craig Chatfield	365	15.4	N/A
Green	Treasa Ni Mhorain	356	15.0	N/A
Green	Grace Pearce	354	14.9	N/A
Reform	Belinda Hands	245	10.3	N/A
Reform	James Bembridge	241	10.2	N/A
Reform	Sinead Roth	227	9.6	N/A
Liberal Democrats	Sally Gray	166	7.0	−4.2
Liberal Democrats	Nigel Heilpern	103	4.3	−4.5
Majority		135	5.7	−0.7
Turnout		2,370	33.3	+1.8
Conservative gain from Labour				
Conservative gain from Labour				
Conservative gain from Labour				

=== Westbourne ===
Westbourne (3)
Party	Candidate	Votes	%	±%
Labour	Adam Hug *	1,072	42.6	−28.1
Labour	David Boothroyd *	1,066	42.4	−24.3
Labour	Angela Piddock *	1,032	41.0	−25.0
Green	Eda Karakas	854	33.9	N/A
Green	Joel Mordi	803	31.9	N/A
Green	Nilton Rodrigues	803	31.9	N/A
Conservative	Sabrina Boni	309	12.3	−6.6
Conservative	George Eldredge	277	11.0	−6.6
Conservative	Alex Duguid	272	10.8	−5.8
Reform	Neil Harrison	204	8.1	N/A
Reform	Niall Moran	179	7.1	N/A
Reform	Amar Johal	174	6.9	N/A
Liberal Democrats	Theresa Booth	143	5.7	−2.5
Liberal Democrats	Elizabeth McQuay	97	3.9	−2.6
Majority		178	7.1	−40.0
Turnout		2,516	33.1	+8.8
Labour hold				
Labour hold				
Labour hold				
