= Festus Akinbusoye =

British politician (born 1978)

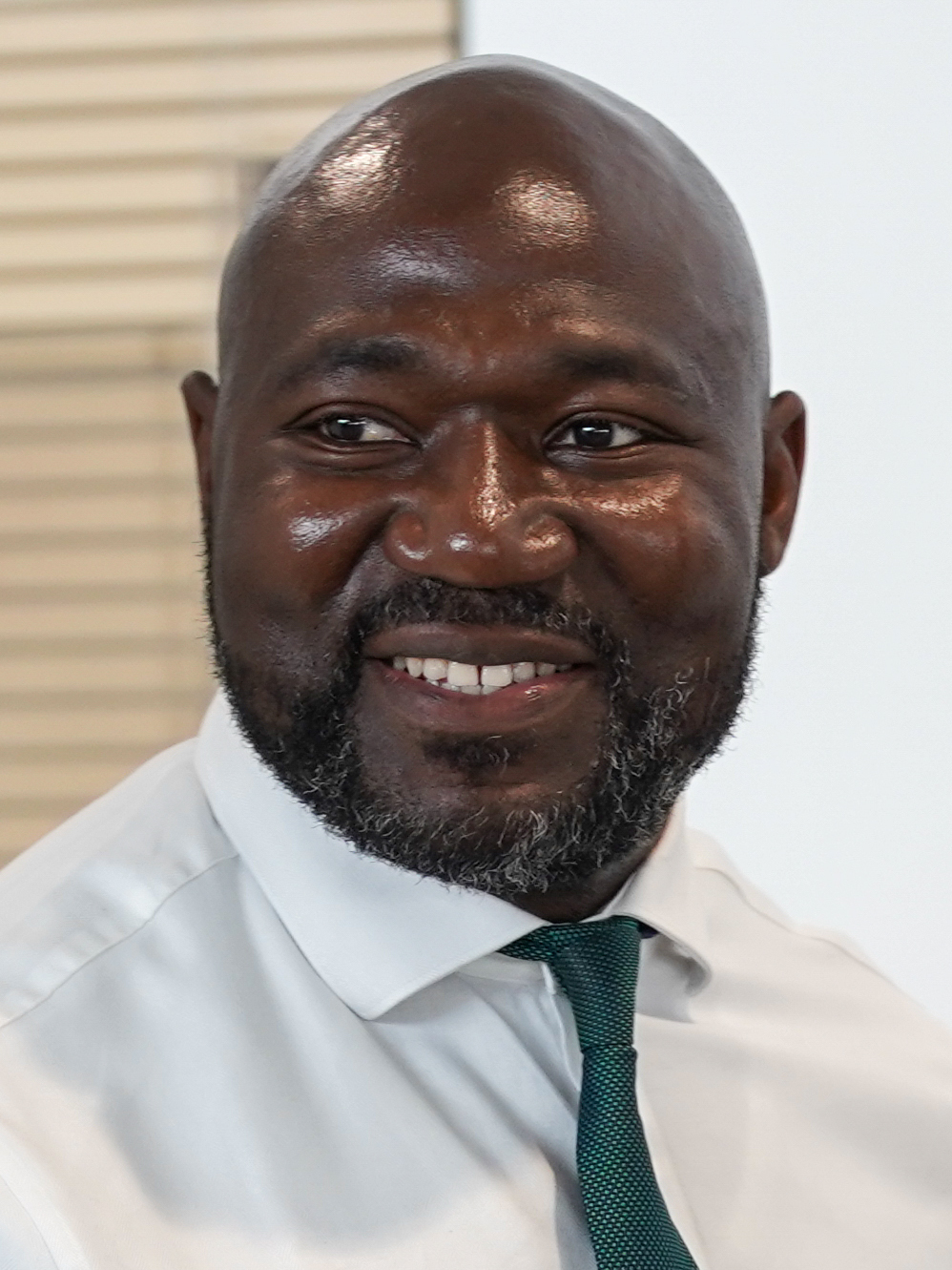
- Akinbusoye in 2023

Member of Westminster City Council for Abbey Road
- Incumbent
- Assumed office 7 May 2026

Bedfordshire Police and Crime Commissioner
- In office 13 May 2021 – 8 May 2024
- Preceded by: Kathryn Holloway
- Succeeded by: John Tizard

Personal details
- Born: Festus Kehinde Akinbusoye; June 1978 (age 48) Lagos, Nigeria
- Party: Conservative
- Education: University of the Arts London (BA); SOAS University of London (MA)
- Website: festus4london.com

Festus Kehinde Akinbusoye (born June 1978) is a British Conservative Party politician who is councillor for Abbey Road ward on Westminster City Council. He was the Bedfordshire Police and Crime Commissioner from 2021 to 2024. He was the first black Briton to serve as a police and crime commissioner. Akinbusoye stood as the Conservative candidate in the 2023 Mid Bedfordshire by-election following the resignation of Nadine Dorries. He lost the by-election, coming in second place to the Labour candidate. In 2024, Akinbusoye lost re-election as Bedfordshire Police and Crime Commissioner.

He was elected to Westminster City Council on 6 May 2026. In September 2026, Akinbusoye announced that he had applied to be the Conservative Party candidate for the 2028 London mayoral election.

== Early life and education ==
Born in Lagos, Nigeria to Nigerian parents, Akinbusoye emigrated in 1991, as a thirteen-year-old with his parents and twin sister. The family settled in Canning Town, East London.

Akinbusoye studied at St Paul's Way School, and the City of Westminster College. He later studied at the London College of Printing and Distributive Trades at the University of the Arts London and read for a master's degree in international studies and diplomacy from the School of Oriental and African Studies at the University of London.

Akinbusoye played basketball at university, and played professionally in what was then called the Budweiser British Basketball League. He has a collection of 40 Air Jordan basketball trainers.

== Political career ==
Akinbusoye stood as a Conservative candidate in the West Ham constituency in the 2015 general election, a safe seat for the Labour Party, where he came second to the Labour candidate Lyn Brown.

During the Brexit referendum campaign in 2016, Akinbusoye supported the remain campaign, and urged fellow black Britons to join him in voting to remain in the European Union. Akinbusoye served as chairman of Milton Keynes Conservatives from 2018 to 2021.

=== Bedfordshire Police and Crime Commissioner ===
In the 2021 election, Akinbusoye was elected as Bedfordshire Police and Crime Commissioner. In this role, he noted his experiences with stop and search as a young man growing up in London, and time mentoring young offenders in prison, as having shaped some of his approach towards policing.

During a 2023 interview with Beth Rigby on Sky News, Akinbusoye supported the appropriate use of police stop and search powers, having used it himself when serving as a special constable in Bedfordshire Police. Rigby asked about his reaction to the David Carrick case, and Akinbusoye said that "the public quite rightly expect there to be no bad apples" in British policing. Rigby talked about racism in British society, and mentioned that when Kwasi Kwarteng was Chancellor, a Labour MP said that Kwarteng was "superficially" black; Akinbusoye said "that was exceptionally, exceptionally disgusting; it was exceptionally in my view racist, and stereotyping in the worst way because he [the Labour MP] was suggesting that to be black you have to be able to speak a certain way, to be black you cannot go to Eton, or Oxford, or the top schools in the world because that's not what black people do."

In 2023, after being selected to contest a parliamentary by-election in Mid Bedfordshire, he was urged by the Bedfordshire Police and Crime Panel to stand down as police and crime commissioner (PCC). A subsequent public meeting revealed that the panel decision and open letter calling on Akinbusoye to step down as PCC while campaigning had not been seen nor agreed to by all panel members as the letter had stated, with a Liberal Democrat member describing the decision as "biased, unfair, undemocratic" and "borderline bullying" of Akinbusoye.

Akinbusoye said he would seek re-election for a second term as Bedfordshire's PCC. In April 2024, Akinbusoye was reprimanded over social media posts he had made. Akinbusoye had alleged in a post that a member of the public had misused public funds. Akinbusoye said he "totally rejects and refutes the findings and will be responding fully as part of the formal process in due course". He was unsuccessful in the May 2024 election, losing to Labour candidate John Tizard. He remarked of his tenure as PCC that he was "really proud of what has been done in three years".

=== 2023 Mid Bedfordshire by-election ===
Following the resignation of MP Nadine Dorries, Akinbusoye was selected by the Conservative Party as their candidate in the 2023 Mid Bedfordshire by-election. He lost to Labour candidate Alistair Strathern. In January, Akinbusoye announced on the Andy Collins BBC Three Counties Radio show that he would not be seeking selection for the next parliamentary election.

=== Westminster City Council ===
In May 2026 Akinbusoye contested and won the local council seat of Abbey Road on Westminster City Council, where Conservatives gained overall control of the council from Labour. Akinbusoye defeated incumbent Alan Mendoza (Reform) who defected from the Conservatives in November 2025. In September 2026, Akinbusoye announced that he had applied to be the Conservative Party candidate for the upcoming 2028 London Mayoral Election. He was beaten in the candidacy by James Cleverly.

== Personal life ==
He revealed that he is a "single father who has raised young children over a decade into very successful young adults, endured the teenage years with some remnant of sanity", and is a member of The Church of Jesus Christ of Latter-day Saints. Akinbusoye runs a facilities management business which employs 50 staff across England, Scotland and Wales. Akinbusoye has stated that he owes his success in business to the help he received from The Prince's Trust aged 23 while growing up in East London.
