= Eartha Pond =

Saint Lucian footballer (born 1983)

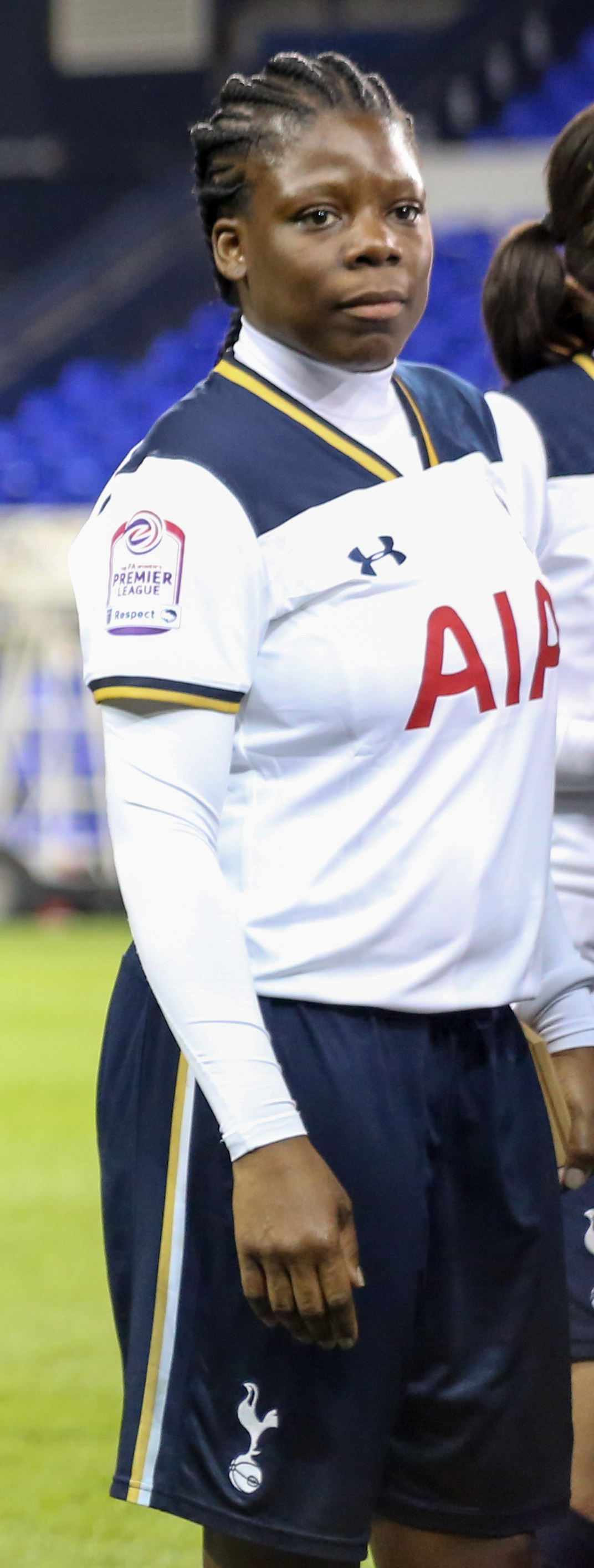
- With Spurs in April 2017

Chair of the Queen's Park Community Council
- Incumbent
- Assumed office 2014
- Preceded by: John McArdle

Member of Queen's Park Community Council
- Incumbent
- Assumed office 2014
- Preceded by: Office established

Personal details
- Born: Eartha Sweetie Pond; 4 September 1983 (age 43)
Association football career
- Position: Defender
Youth career
- 1995–1999: Arsenal
Senior career*
Years	Team	Apps	(Gls)
1999–2001	Chelsea		
2001–2002	Charlton Athletic		
2002	Arsenal		
2002–2007	Charlton Athletic		
2007–2008	Leeds United		
2008–2009	Arsenal	7	(0)
2009–2010	Chelsea		
2010	Buffalo Flash	11	(4)
2011	Barnet		
2011–2012	Birmingham City	3	(0)
2012	Everton	1	(0)
2013	Queens Park Rangers		
2014	Reading		
2014–2018	Tottenham Hotspur		
International career
2023	Saint Lucia	2	(0)
- * Club domestic league appearances and goals

Eartha Sweetie Pond (born 4 September 1983) is a footballer. Born in England, she plays internationally for Saint Lucia. She previously played club football as a defender for Arsenal, Chelsea, Everton, Charlton Athletic, Leeds, and Tottenham Hotspur. She is currently the Non-Executive Director on the Football Association's Women's Football Board.

== Early life and education ==
Pond was raised in Queen's Park, London. At 11 years old, she was scouted by Arsenal F.C. and began playing for them at age 12 in 1995.

== Club career ==
Pond played as a defender for a large variety of football clubs throughout her career. Early in her career she played for Arsenal, Chelsea, and Charlton. She signed for Charlton from Arsenal in summer 2002, and made the 2003 FA Women's Cup final, in which Charlton were beaten 3–0 by Fulham.

After spending 2007–08 with Leeds United, Pond returned to Arsenal for 2008–09. She was seen as a versatile, left-sided defender who had already overcome two serious knee injuries. She started two of her seven FA Women's Premier League appearances for Arsenal.

Pond was part of Arsenal's 2009 FA Cup winning squad. Pond moved on to Chelsea the following season, and then left England for the only time in her career to join the Buffalo Flash of the United States based W-League. She scored four goals in 11 appearances. The Flash would go on to win the W-League championship at the end of the season, making it two trophies in two years for Pond. She would move on to play with Barnet and Birmingham City during 2011. Her 2013 season at Queen's Park Rangers saw her play as a stand-in goalkeeper for injured teammate and score in the same match. On 3 April 2014, Pond was announced as a signing by Reading. Later that year she would join Tottenham Hotspur.

Pond won a quadruple with Tottenham Hotspur, the most notable trophy being the overall winner of the FA Women's Premier League, a promotion playoff that saw Spurs reach the second tier of English women's football for the first time.

== Post-playing career ==
After her professional football career, Pond took positions as a physical education teacher and held administrative educational roles. In 2019, she petitioned the Government of the United Kingdom to make physical education a core course, alongside subjects like maths and English.

She was elected as a local councillor on the Queen's Park Community Council in London in 2014 and was re-elected in 2018 and 2022. She is chair of the council.

She was instrumental in supporting victims of the Grenfell Tower fire.

In 2021, Pond assumed the inaugural position of Non-Executive Director on The Football Association's Women’s Football Board.

== International career ==
Pond had youth caps with various England squads, but she did not make her senior international debut until her club career had come to a close. She debuted for Saint Lucia in September 2023, starting games against Cuba and Guadeloupe in Group B of League C of CONCACAF Women's Gold Cup Qualifying. In the latter game, she registered two assists, as Saint Lucia won 5-1. She was included in the squad for Saint Lucia's December games against the same two opponents.

In March 2004 Pond received a 49-day FA ban after she and Carmaine Walker had engaged in a fight with Carly and Gemma Hunt at a national team conditioning session the previous September.

At the 2011 Summer Universiade in Shenzhen, China, Pond captained the Great Britain Universities team to a ninth place finish. That year she declared her ambition to represent Team GB at both handball and football at the 2012 London Olympics.

== Honours ==
=== Arsenal ===
- Women's FA Cup: 2008–09

=== Buffalo Flash ===
- USL W-League Championship: 2010

=== Tottenham Hotspur ===
- FA Women's Premier League Championship Playoff: 2016–17
- FA Women's Premier League Southern Division: 2016–17
- Ryman's Women's Cup: 2015–16, 2016–17
- FA Women's Premier League Cup Winners (1): 2015–16, 2016–17
