= School of Business, University of Central Lancashire =

Coordinates: 53.763021°N 2.7074°W

- Type: Business School
- Parent institution: University of Central Lancashire
- Location: UCLan, Preston, PR1 2HE, England, United Kingdom
- Campus: Urban
- Website: https://www.uclan.ac.uk/schools/business

The School of Business at the University of Central Lancashire (previously known as Lancashire Business School) at the University of Central Lancashire (UCLan) is a business school based in the city of Preston, Lancashire, England. It is located in a building at the heart of UCLan’s campus, close to the city centre.

== Courses ==
The School of Business delivers courses at undergraduate and postgraduate levels, including an MBA and its flagship programme Doctor of Business Administration, as well as offering bespoke programmes to businesses and organisations. Its academic programmes are supported by links with the business world.

== Research ==
Nearly a third of the research conducted at the School of Business was rated as world-leading or of international significance in the recent Research Assessment Exercise RAE (2008). It is also home to six Research Institutes.

== Accreditations ==
A number of the school's programmes have received accreditation from professional bodies, allowing either a joint award to be made on completion of a degree course, or direct entry to or advanced standing on professional qualifications.

- The Association of Chartered Certified Accountants (ACCA)
- Chartered Institute of Management Accountants (CIMA)
- Chartered Institute of Marketing (CIM)
- Chartered Institute of Public Relations (CIPR)
- Chartered Institute of Personnel & Development (CIPD)
- SAP University Alliance

The School of Business is a member of the Chartered Association of Business Schools (CABS) and the European Foundation for Management Development (EFMD).
