= Bedfordshire Police and Crime Commissioner =

- Incumbent; John Tizard since 9 May 2024
- Police and crime commissioner of Bedfordshire Police
- Reports to: Bedfordshire Police and Crime Panel
- Appointer: Electorate of Bedfordshire
- Term length: Four years
- Constituting instrument: Police Reform and Social Responsibility Act 2011
- Precursor: Bedfordshire Police Authority
- Inaugural holder: Olly Martins
- Formation: 22 November 2012
- Deputy: None appointed
- Salary: £73,300
- Website: www.bedfordshire.pcc.police.uk

The Bedfordshire Police and Crime Commissioner is the police and crime commissioner, an elected official tasked with setting out the way crime is tackled by Bedfordshire Police in the English County of Bedfordshire. The post was created in November 2012, following an election held on 15 November 2012, and replaced the Bedfordshire Police Authority. The current incumbent is John Tizard, who represents the Labour Party. The current chief executive of the Office of the Police and Crime Commissioner (OPCC) is Clare Kelly.

== List of Bedfordshire Police and Crime Commissioners ==
Name	Political party	From	To
Olly Martins	Labour Co-op	22 November 2012	11 May 2016
Kathryn Holloway	Conservative	12 May 2016	12 May 2021
Festus Akinbusoye	Conservative	13 May 2021	8 May 2024
John Tizard	Labour Co-op	9 May 2024	Incumbent

== Elections ==
2024 Bedfordshire police and crime commissioner election
Party	Candidate	Votes	%	±%
Labour Co-op	John Tizard	40,738	40.5	▲5.5
Conservative	Festus Akinbusoye*	35,688	35.5	▼6.9
Liberal Democrats	Jasbir Singh Parmar	15,857	15.8	▼2.7
Workers Party	Waheed Akbar	8,396	8.3	▲8.3
Majority		5,050	4.50	
Turnout		100,679	19.78	
Labour gain from Conservative		Swing		

== See also ==
- 2012 England and Wales police and crime commissioner elections
- 2016 England and Wales police and crime commissioner elections
- 2021 England and Wales police and crime commissioner elections
- 2024 England and Wales police and crime commissioner elections
