= John Tizard =

English Labour Party politician

Bedfordshire Police and Crime Commissioner
- Incumbent
- Assumed office 9 May 2024
- Preceded by: Festus Akinbusoye

Personal details
- Born: John Nigel Tizard; November 1954 (age 71)
- Party: Labour Co-op
- Spouse: Glenda Tizard
- Education: London School of Economics (BSc)
- Website: johntizard.com

John Nigel Tizard (born November 1954) is a British Labour Co‑operative politician, currently serving as the Police and Crime Commissioner (PCC) for Bedfordshire since May 2024.

== Early life ==
John Tizard was born in November 1954 and grew up in Essex. He attended Colchester Royal Grammar School, a selective boys’ school, before going on to study at the London School of Economics and Political Science (LSE). At LSE, he graduated with a Bachelor of Science degree in Economics and Mathematics.

== Career ==
=== Political career ===
Tizard’s political journey began with his election to Bedfordshire County Council in 1981, representing the Labour Party. He served on the council for eighteen years, during which time he led the Labour group for fourteen years and acted as joint leader of the council. His time in local government was marked by his advocacy for inclusive community governance and regional development initiatives.

=== Business and Academic Roles ===
Following his departure from elected local office in 1999, Tizard transitioned into a senior executive role at Capita Group, a major FTSE 100 outsourcing and professional services company. He worked there from 1997 to 2007, eventually serving as Group Director for Government and Business Engagement. His role involved extensive liaison with public sector clients and strategic leadership in shaping outsourcing relationships.

Between 2008 and 2013, Tizard worked in higher education, directing research centres on public service delivery at the University of Birmingham and London South Bank University. He wrote widely on commissioning, democratic governance, and social enterprise, producing policy papers for organisations such as the Fabian Society, the Smith Institute, and UNISON.

=== Police and Crime Commissioner ===
Tizard was elected Bedfordshire Police and Crime Commissioner on 2 May 2024, officially taking office on 9 May. He succeeded Conservative incumbent Festus Akinbusoye. Upon taking office, Tizard launched a comprehensive Police and Crime Plan in September 2024, built around seven core missions: crime prevention, tackling violence against women and children, neighbourhood and community policing, combatting serious organised crime, improving service excellence and responsiveness, victim support, and strengthening local partnership engagement.

Nationally, he plays an active role within the Association of Police and Crime Commissioners (APCC). He serves as vice-chair of the Performance, Data and Technology portfolio, represents PCCs in multiple national oversight groups coordinated by His Majesty’s Inspectorate of Constabulary and Fire & Rescue Services (HMICFRS), and sits as vice-chair of the Counter-Terrorism Collaboration Agreement Strategic Board.

In late 2024, Tizard publicly warned that government underfunding of police forces was creating serious operational pressures. He echoed the concerns of other Labour PCCs in expressing alarm over the financial sustainability of local policing and raised concerns that officer numbers and community services might be at risk unless funding formulas were urgently reviewed.

== Private life ==
John Tizard has lived in Bedfordshire for nearly fifty years. He is married to Glenda Tizard, with whom he shares a long-standing involvement in community and voluntary service. Outside of his formal roles, Tizard is active in mental health advocacy and the arts. He is chair of Action Space, a London-based arts charity focused on learning disability inclusion, and a trustee of Making Me, a Bedford-based children's mental health education charity.

He has written prolifically on public policy, with a focus on ethical governance, democratic accountability, and public sector transformation. Tizard frequently speaks at national and international conferences and contributes to academic and policy publications.
