= Olly Martins =

British politician (born 1969)

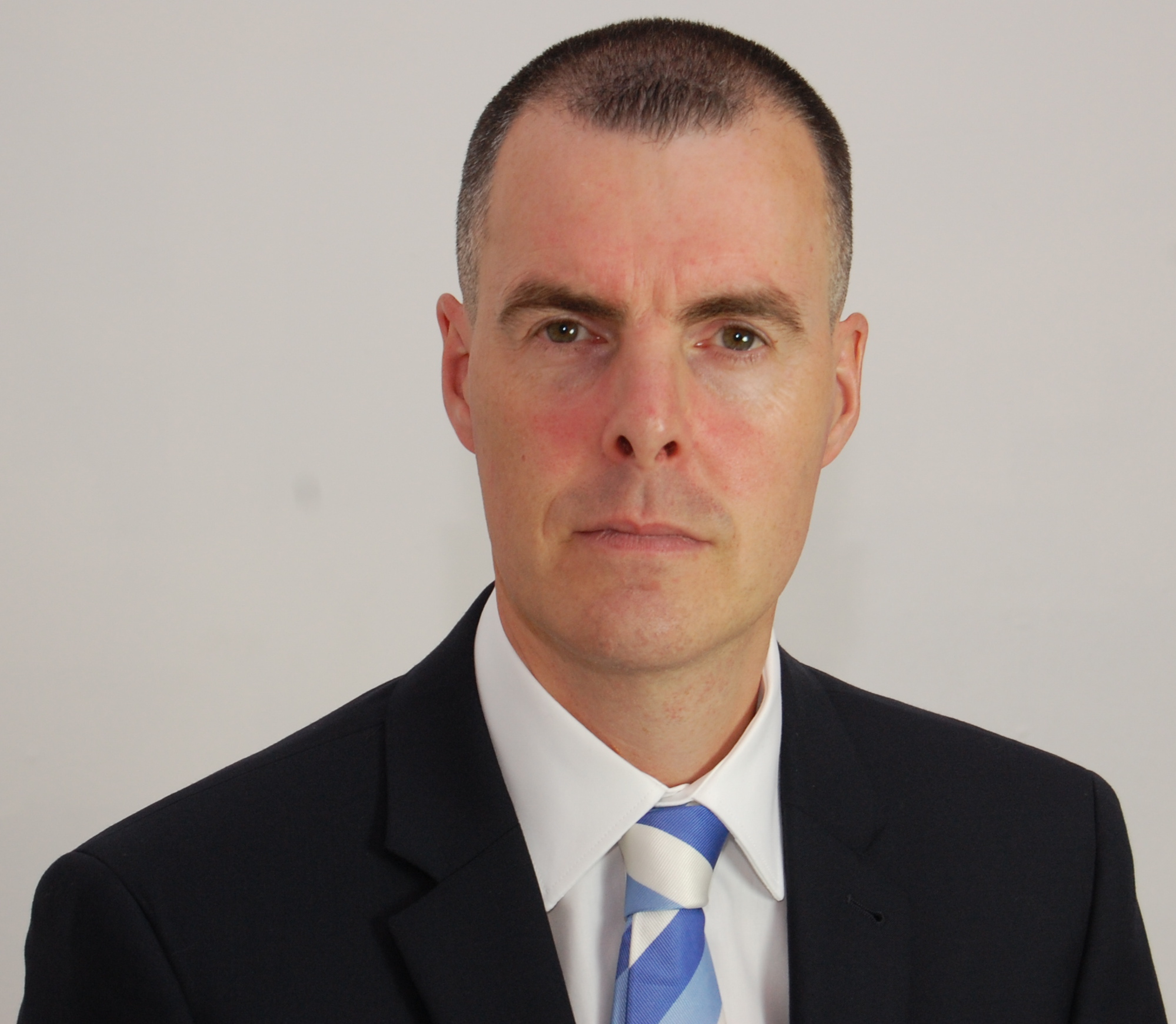

Bedfordshire Police and Crime Commissioner
- In office 22 November 2012 – 11 May 2016
- Preceded by: Office created
- Succeeded by: Kathryn Holloway

Personal details
- Born: Oliver James Martins; 17 December 1969 (age 56) Cambridge, Cambridgeshire, England
- Party: Labour Co-op
- Education: Flegg High School
- Alma mater: University of Liverpool

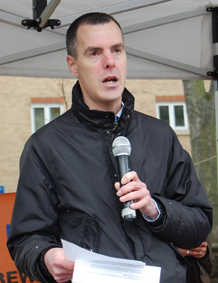
Martins in 2012

Oliver James Martins (born 17 December 1969) is a British politician. He served as the Labour and Co-operative Bedfordshire Police and Crime Commissioner from 2012 to 2016.

== Career ==
Born in Cambridge, Martins spent eight years working for Victim Support in the Toxteth area of Liverpool, first as a volunteer while at University and then as a service co-ordinator. Before being elected as Police and Crime Commissioner for Bedfordshire, Martins worked for the Labour Party MP, Maria Eagle.

== Police and Crime Commissioner for Bedfordshire ==
Martins was the first person to hold the Bedfordshire post and was elected on 15 November 2012. He took the Oath of office live on air at a local BBC radio station. On taking office, he pledged that his office and staff would be less expensive than the old police authority. He did not claim business miles for any road journeys he undertook as part of his role. He opposed plans to outsource police services to G4S. On 29 January 2013 it was announced that the G4S plan involving three police force, Bedfordshire, Cambridgeshire and Hertfordshire had been scrapped. Martins reversed the planned axing of half the PCSOs in Bedfordshire.

Martins has called for persistent offenders to be fitted with GPS tags on a compulsory basis so they can be tracked in real time.

In May 2013, Martins appointed Colette Paul as the new Chief Constable of Bedfordshire. Paul was previously Deputy Chief Constable of South Wales Police. She has said about the Commissioner, "Olly Martins is committed to improving policing, as am I, so we have a good working relationship already." Paul announced her early retirement in June 2015 and said, "I consider Bedfordshire fortunate to have the PCC, Olly Martins, who is committed to ensuring the best possible future for the force."

On 26 August, Martins appointed the Deputy Chief Constable, Jon Boutcher, as the new Chief Constable. Martins aimed to double the number of Special Constables in the Bedfordshire Police force. The roll-out of Body Worn Video (BWV) cameras for officers and PCSOs started in June 2013. Public panels scrutinise the stop and search paperwork and video footage from police officers.

He planned to introduce hi-tech tablet devices for Police officers as part as part of a drive to get them spending more time on the streets. In 2014, Bedfordshire Police allowed The Garden Productions to make 24 Hours in Police Custody, a series for Channel 4 with multiple cameras in Luton Police station. The series received positive reviews.

In January 2015, Martins announced plans to consult the public on whether they would be prepared to pay 16% extra on the police precept to fund 100 more police officers across Bedfordshire.

On 5 February, Martins announced that he would hold the first ever police precept referendum in the country. The Bedfordshire-wide referendum took place on 7 May, the same day as the UK general election. Martins' proposed precept was rejected by 69.5% to 30.5%. In a statement Martins said, "It is therefore now incumbent upon the government to take notice of our unique circumstances in Bedfordshire and to ensure that this police force has the resources it needs not just to keep this county safe but to play its proper role in keeping the country safe.". In October 2015, Martins launched a Save Our Police campaign linked to a government petition calling for better funding for Bedfordshire Police.

In November 2015, Martins gave evidence to the Home Affairs Select Committee and warned of the Bedfordshire Police funding crisis. The Daily Mirror said of his appearance at the select committee, "Mr Martins has been one of Britain's most outspoken police commissioners as George Osborne tells the Home Office to prepare for cuts of up to 40%".

In the 2015 Autumn Statement, the Chancellor did not make the expected cuts to the policing budget. However, Martins continued to make the case for a better funding deal for his police force.

Martins was defeated by the Conservative candidate Kathryn Holloway at the 2016 England and Wales police and crime commissioner elections.

== Controversy ==
In 2014 Martins was suspended from the Labour Party and investigated by the Independent Police Complaints Commission after he disclosed confidential information about the death of a man in police custody.

== Personal life ==
In December 2018 Police Oracle revealed that Olly Martins had joined the Special Constabulary.

In 2023 he married his partner of 30 years.

== Other activities ==
Martins was a patron of LGBT Labour.
