= Queen's Park (Westminster ward) =

Electoral ward

- Electoral ward for the Westminster City Council
- Queen's Park (Westminster) ward boundaries since 2022
- Borough: Westminster
- County: Greater London
- Population: 12,756 (2021) (Note: 2021 Census data reported for 2022 ward boundaries)
- Electorate: 8,350 (2022)
- Area: 0.5835 square kilometres (0.2253 sq mi)

Current electoral ward
- Created: 1965
- Number of members: 1965–1978: 2; 1978–present: 3
- Councillors: Patricia McAllister; Hamza Taouzzale; Cara Sanquest
- GSS code: E05013804 (2022–present)

Queen's Park is an electoral ward in the City of Westminster, returning councillors to Westminster City Council.

== Westminster council elections since 2022 ==
There was a revision of ward boundaries in Westminster in 2022.

=== 2022 election ===
The election took place on 5 May 2022.

2022 Westminster City Council election: Queen's Park (3)
Party	Candidate	Votes	%	±%
Labour	Patricia McAllister	1,691	76.6	
Labour	Cara Sanquest	1,568	71.0	
Labour	Hamza Taouzzale	1,523	69.0	
Conservative	Hannah Galley	380	17.2	
Conservative	Bota Hopkinson	315	14.3	
Conservative	Emma Sargent	334	15.1	
Liberal Democrats	Helen Toeman	189	8.6	
Liberal Democrats	Jack Dykstra-McCarthy	143	6.5	
Liberal Democrats	Kati Tschawow	113	5.1	
Turnout		2,207	26.61	
Labour win (new boundaries)				
Labour win (new boundaries)				
Labour win (new boundaries)				

== 2002–2022 Westminster council elections ==
There was a revision of ward boundaries in Westminster in 2002.

=== 2018 election ===
The election took place on 3 May 2018.

2018 Westminster City Council election: Queen's Park (3)
Party	Candidate	Votes	%	±%
Labour	Patricia McAllister	2,248	76.4	+6.5
Labour	Paul Dimoldenberg	2,210	75.1	+8.0
Labour	Hamza Taouzzale	2,038	69.3	+3.6
Conservative	Sarah Rick-Harris	472	16.0	−3.8
Conservative	Timothy Cohen	418	14.2	−0.5
Conservative	Laila Dupuy	391	13.3	−0.7
Liberal Democrats	Andrew New	220	7.5	N/A
Liberal Democrats	Jane Smithard	193	6.6	N/A
Liberal Democrats	Robert Cottrell	191	6.5	N/A
Majority		1566	53.3	
Turnout		8381	36.2	+0.8
Labour hold		Swing		
Labour hold		Swing		
Labour hold		Swing		

=== 2014 election ===
The election took place on 22 May 2014.

2014 Westminster City Council election: Queen's Park (3)
Party	Candidate	Votes	%	±%
Labour	Patricia McAllister	1,921	69.9	
Labour	Paul Dimoldenberg	1,844	67.1	
Labour	Barrie Taylor	1,805	65.7	
Conservative	Matthew Green	545	19.8	
Green	Jurgen Huber	454	16.5	
Conservative	Abdul Ahad	403	14.7	
Conservative	Eliza Richardson	385	14.0	
Majority		1260	45.9	
Turnout		6866	35.4	−23.4
Labour hold		Swing		
Labour hold		Swing		
Labour hold		Swing		

== 1978–2002 Westminster council elections ==
There was a revision of ward boundaries in Westminster in 1978.

== 1968–1978 Westminster council elections ==
There was a revision of ward boundaries in Westminster in 1968.

== 1964–1968 Westminster council elections ==
=== 1964 election ===
The election took place on 7 May 1964.

1964 Westminster City Council election: Queen's Park (2)
Party	Candidate	Votes	%	±%
Labour	G. Lowe	1,694		
Labour	I.Bolton	1,665		
Conservative	W. Bratton	343		
Conservative	E. White	321		
Liberal	J. Gibbons	154		
Liberal	M. Singer	133		
Turnout		2,186	32.9	
Labour win (new seat)				
Labour win (new seat)				
