= Kathryn Holloway (police commissioner) =

English Conservative Party politician

Bedfordshire Police and Crime Commissioner
- In office 12 May 2016 – 12 May 2021
- Preceded by: Olly Martins
- Succeeded by: Festus Akinbusoye

Kathryn Holloway was Police and Crime Commissioner of Bedfordshire, England, from May 2016 until 2021. She led governance for the seven police forces of Eastern England across all Counter Terrorism and Serious Organised Crime operations, until stepping down in 2021. Prior to being elected as the Conservative Party candidate for PCC, she was a radio and TV presenter.

Political offices
Preceded by Olly Martins	Bedfordshire Police and Crime Commissioner; 2016–2021	Succeeded by Festus Akinbusoye
