= Marylebone (ward) =

Electoral ward in the City of Westminster, England

- Electoral ward for the Westminster City Council
- Marylebone ward boundaries
- Borough: Westminster
- County: Greater London
- Population: 12,157 (2021) (Note: 2021 Census data reported for 2022 ward boundaries)
- Electorate: 8,147 (2022)
- Major settlements: Marylebone
- Area: 1.235 square kilometres (0.477 sq mi)

Current electoral ward
- Created: 2022
- Number of members: 3
- Councillors: Ian Rowley; Barbara Arzymanow; Karen Scarborough
- Created from: Bryanston and Dorset Square, Marylebone High Street, West End
- GSS code: E05013801

Marylebone is an electoral ward in the City of Westminster. The ward was first used in the 2022 elections. It returns three councillors to Westminster City Council.

== List of councillors ==
Term	Councillor	Party
2022–present	Ian Rowley	Conservative
2022–present	Barbara Arzymanow	Conservative
2022–present	Karen Scarborough	Conservative

== Westminster council elections ==
=== 2022 election ===
The election took place on 5 May 2022.

2022 Westminster City Council election: Marylebone
Party	Candidate	Votes	%	±%
Conservative	Ian Rowley	1,186	45.6	
Conservative	Barbara Arzymanow	1,154	44.4	
Conservative	Karen Scarborough	1,146	44.0	
Liberal Democrats	Alistair Barr	866	33.3	
Liberal Democrats	Elizabeth Botsford	785	30.2	
Liberal Democrats	Freddie Poser	645	24.8	
Labour	Barbara Johnston	583	22.4	
Labour	Jo Broadey	581	22.3	
Labour	Michael Lord	546	21.0	
Turnout		2,602	32.06	
Conservative win (new seat)				
Conservative win (new seat)				
Conservative win (new seat)				
