= 2018 Westminster City Council election =

Election held for the Westminster City Council in London

- 3 May 2018

All 60 seats to Westminster City Council 31 seats needed for a majority
- Turnout: 37.98%

	First party	Second party
Party	Conservative	Labour
Last election	44 seats, 41.0%	16 seats, 33.5%
Seats won	41	19
Seat change	▼3	▲3
Popular vote	22,656	21,733
Percentage	42.8%	41.1%
Swing	▲1.8%	▲7.6%
- 2018 Westminster Borough Council election results map. Conservatives in blue and Labour in red.
Council control before election
Conservative
Council control after election
Conservative

The 2018 Westminster City Council election was held on 3 May 2018, the same day as other London Boroughs. All 60 seats were up for election along with the 12 seats of Queen's Park Community Council, the parish council in the north west of the city. Despite initial expectations of Labour gains across the borough, the Conservative party were able to hold the council and only lost three seats. The Conservatives won the popular vote across the borough by a small margin of 923 votes (1.7%), but nonetheless won a decisive victory in terms of seats, winning 41 councillors to Labour's 19.

The Conservatives, Labour and the Liberal Democrats all ran full slates of 60 candidates. There were also candidates from the Greens, as well as three from the Campaign Against Pedestrianisation of Oxford Street.

The count took place in Lindley Hall and ran overnight.

== Result ==
Westminster local election result 2018
Party	Seats	Gains	Losses	Net gain/loss	Seats %	Votes %	Votes	+/−
Conservative	41	1	4	-3	68.3	41.9	22,656	+0.9
Labour	19	4	1	+3	31.7	40.3	21,762	+6.8
Liberal Democrats	0	0	0	0	0.0	9.8	5,272	+3.4
Green	0	0	0	0	0.0	5.7	3,069	-7.8
Independent	0	0	0	0	0.0	0.3	164	-1.4
Others	0	0	0	0	0.0	2.1	1,137	+2.1

== Ward results ==
The vote shares are calculated as a percentage of the number of electors who voted in each relevant ward. The raw majority number is the margin of votes between the lowest-placed winning party candidate and the runner-up party's highest-placed losing candidate. Starred candidates are the incumbents.

=== Abbey Road ===
Abbey Road (3)
Party	Candidate	Votes	%	±%
Conservative	Lindsey Hall *	1,542	65.2	+1.7
Conservative	Peter Freeman *	1,503	63.6	+1.6
Conservative	Judith Warner *	1,480	62.6	+0.5
Labour	Phillida Inman	480	20.3	−3.9
Labour	Sam Gardner	479	20.3	−1.0
Labour	Connor Jones	402	17.0	−0.9
Liberal Democrats	Helen Davies	294	12.4	+1.4
Green	Emmanuelle Tandy	212	9.0	−4.2
Liberal Democrats	Seth Weisz	203	8.6	N/A
Liberal Democrats	Peter Toeman	193	8.2	N/A
Majority		1000	42.3	
Turnout		6788	37.0	+6.1
Conservative hold		Swing		
Conservative hold		Swing		
Conservative hold		Swing		

=== Bayswater ===
Bayswater (3)
Party	Candidate	Votes	%	±%
Labour	Maggie Carman	1,018	39.6	+16.2
Conservative	Francis Elcho	1,013	39.4	−5.2
Conservative	Emily Payne	1,011	39.4	±0.0
Conservative	Richard Holloway *	937	36.5	−3.9
Labour	Dafydd Elis	916	35.7	+13.2
Labour	Max Sullivan	851	33.1	+13.0
Liberal Democrats	Phillip Kerle	532	20.7	−4.5
Liberal Democrats	Sarah Ryan	509	19.8	−4.2
Liberal Democrats	Patrick Ryan	449	17.5	−2.3
Green	Lionel Fry	233	9.1	−9.5
Majority		74	2.9	
Turnout		7469	39.7	+9.3
Labour gain from Conservative		Swing		
Conservative hold		Swing		
Conservative hold		Swing		

=== Bryanston and Dorset Square ===
Bryanston and Dorset Square (3)
Party	Candidate	Votes	%	±%
Conservative	Richard Beddoe *	1,137	51.8	−6.0
Conservative	Barbara Arzymanow	1,069	48.7	−10.4
Conservative	Eoghain Murphy	986	44.9	−6.5
Labour	Rima Horton	585	26.6	+3.7
Labour	Mohamed Hammeda	473	21.5	+1.2
Labour	Neil Taylor	455	20.7	+1.6
Campaign Against Pedestrianisation of Oxford Street	Kevin Coyne	452	20.6	N/A
Liberal Democrats	Nicola Browne	351	16.0	+2.0
Liberal Democrats	Thierry Serero	280	12.8	+1.0
Green	Michael Fry	279	12.7	−6.0
Liberal Democrats	Martin Thompson	210	9.6	N/A
Majority		401	18.3	
Turnout		6277	39.7	+3.3
Conservative hold		Swing		
Conservative hold		Swing		
Conservative hold		Swing		

Results are compared with the 2014 council election, not the 2015 by-election.

=== Church Street ===
Church Street (3)
Party	Candidate	Votes	%	±%
Labour	Aicha Less *	1,796	73.5	+5.1
Labour	Abdul Toki *	1,739	71.1	+12.0
Labour	Matt Noble	1,727	70.6	+11.7
Conservative	Margot Bright	418	17.1	−1.2
Conservative	Adam Dean	381	15.6	−0.9
Conservative	Rachid Boufas	358	14.6	−2.0
Green	David Blyth	176	7.2	−6.2
Liberal Democrats	Mathieu Primot	121	4.9	N/A
Liberal Democrats	Rachel Jagger	120	4.9	N/A
Liberal Democrats	Andrew Shaylor	84	3.4	N/A
Majority		1309	53.5	
Turnout		6920	33.5	−1.3
Labour hold		Swing		
Labour hold		Swing		
Labour hold		Swing		

Results are compared with the 2014 council election, not the 2016 by-election.

=== Churchill ===
Churchill (3)
Party	Candidate	Votes	%	±%
Labour	Shamim Talukder *	1,303	44.6	−2.0
Labour	Andrea Mann	1,281	43.9	−3.3
Conservative	Murad Gassanly *	1,243	42.6	−4.6
Labour	Jason Williams *	1,234	42.2	−1.4
Conservative	Shaista Miah	1,208	41.4	+0.9
Conservative	Bota Hopkinson	1,182	40.5	+1.5
Liberal Democrats	Richard Bath	223	7.6	+0.6
Liberal Democrats	Keith Dugmore	198	6.8	−0.2
Liberal Democrats	Omar Hegazi	168	5.8	N/A
Independent	Muhammad Uddin	164	5.6	−4.4
Majority		9	0.4	
Turnout		8204	45.6	+3.8
Labour hold		Swing		
Labour hold		Swing		
Conservative gain from Labour		Swing		

Murad Gassanly was elected in 2014 as a Labour Party candidate, before becoming an Independent and then joining the Conservative Party. The change in his share of the vote is shown from his result as a Labour candidate in 2014.

=== Harrow Road ===
Harrow Road (3)
Party	Candidate	Votes	%	±%
Labour	Ruth Bush *	2,023	74.9	+4.6
Labour	Guthrie McKie *	1,804	66.8	+8.1
Labour	Tim Roca *	1,660	61.5	+5.9
Conservative	Grazyna Green	461	17.1	−4.4
Conservative	Aled Rhys Jones	414	15.3	−0.7
Conservative	Thomas Weekenborg	386	14.3	+0.6
Green	Roc Sandford	347	12.9	−5.3
Liberal Democrats	Michael Griffin	182	6.7	N/A
Liberal Democrats	Kevin Greenan	179	6.6	N/A
Liberal Democrats	Dorothy Newman	175	6.5	N/A
Majority		1199	44.4	
Turnout		7631	34.4	+1.5
Labour hold		Swing		
Labour hold		Swing		
Labour hold		Swing		

Results are compared with the 2014 council election, not the 2015 by-election.

=== Hyde Park ===
Hyde Park (3)
Party	Candidate	Votes	%	±%
Conservative	Antonia Cox *	1,104	52.0	−6.8
Conservative	Ian Adams	1,100	51.8	+1.7
Conservative	Heather Acton *	1,093	51.5	−7.3
Labour	Barbara Hainsworth	674	31.7	+1.9
Labour	Judith Southern	654	30.8	+4.0
Labour	David Lumby	598	28.2	+6.0
Liberal Democrats	Sian Morgan	263	12.4	N/A
Green	Alex Horn	239	11.3	−2.5
Liberal Democrats	Valentine Moscovici	212	10.0	N/A
Liberal Democrats	Roy Yaghi	201	9.5	N/A
Majority		419	19.8	
Turnout		6138	31.3	+4.7
Conservative hold		Swing		
Conservative hold		Swing		
Conservative hold		Swing		

=== Knightsbridge and Belgravia ===
Knightsbridge and Belgravia (3)
Party	Candidate	Votes	%	±%
Conservative	Tony Devenish *	1,176	79.4	+4.5
Conservative	Elizabeth Hitchcock	1,164	78.6	+0.7
Conservative	Rachael Robathan *	1,144	77.2	+0.7
Liberal Democrats	Rosamund Durnford-Slater	158	10.7	N/A
Labour	Marini Thorne	153	10.3	−2.2
Labour	Peter Heap	152	10.3	−0.1
Labour	James Thomson	135	9.1	+0.6
Liberal Democrats	Chas Foulds	126	8.5	N/A
Liberal Democrats	Jonah Weisz	93	6.3	N/A
Majority		986	66.5	
Turnout		4301	34.5	+8.2
Conservative hold		Swing		
Conservative hold		Swing		
Conservative hold		Swing		

=== Lancaster Gate ===
Lancaster Gate (3)
Party	Candidate	Votes	%	±%
Conservative	Susie Burbridge *	1,318	49.6	−9.0
Conservative	Robert Davis *	1,226	46.2	−7.3
Conservative	Andrew Smith *	1,223	46.1	−5.1
Labour	Angela Piddock	992	37.2	+14.2
Labour	Liz Whitmore	967	36.3	+13.1
Labour	Simon Wyatt	852	32.0	+8.4
Liberal Democrats	Sue Baring	456	17.1	+2.5
Liberal Democrats	Sally Gray	376	14.1	N/A
Liberal Democrats	Nathalie Ubilava	321	12.0	N/A
Majority		231	8.9	
Turnout		7731	38.1	+9.1
Conservative hold		Swing		
Conservative hold		Swing		
Conservative hold		Swing		

=== Little Venice ===
Little Venice (3)
Party	Candidate	Votes	%	±%
Conservative	Melvyn Caplan *	1,479	50.4	−1.0
Conservative	Lorraine Dean	1,422	48.5	−1.7
Conservative	Matthew Green	1,354	46.1	−4.1
Labour	Sue Wolff	1,177	40.1	+7.7
Labour	Iman Less	1,148	39.1	+7.4
Labour	Murad Qureshi	1,127	38.4	+7.4
Liberal Democrats	Marianne Magnin	307	10.5	+2.6
Liberal Democrats	Benjamin Hurdis	275	9.4	N/A
Liberal Democrats	Roberto Ekholm	264	9.0	+1.7
Majority		177	6.0	
Turnout		8553	44.3	+11.8
Conservative hold		Swing		
Conservative hold		Swing		
Conservative hold		Swing		

=== Maida Vale ===
Maida Vale (3)
Party	Candidate	Votes	%	±%
Labour	Geoff Barraclough	1,306	47.9	+11.6
Labour	Rita Begum *	1,301	47.8	+4.4
Labour	Nafsika Butler-Thalassis	1,254	46.0	+10.8
Conservative	Jan Prendergast *	1,195	43.9	−6.0
Conservative	Amanda Langford	1,084	39.8	−3.6
Conservative	Nathan Parsad	1,079	39.6	+2.8
Green	Lynnet Pready	246	9.0	−7.3
Liberal Democrats	Haude Polner	202	7.4	−4.4
Liberal Democrats	Michael Cox	160	5.9	N/A
Liberal Democrats	Charles Goodman	157	5.8	N/A
Majority		59	2.1	
Turnout		7984	40.8	+5.0
Labour gain from Conservative		Swing		
Labour hold		Swing		
Labour gain from Conservative		Swing		

=== Marylebone High Street ===
Marylebone High Street (3)
Party	Candidate	Votes	%	±%
Conservative	Iain Bott *	1,181	59.2	−5.6
Conservative	Ian Rowley *	1,147	57.5	−4.4
Conservative	Karen Scarborough *	1,101	55.2	−2.9
Labour	Florence Kettle	395	19.8	+1.3
Labour	Barbara Johnston	383	19.2	+2.2
Labour	Cheyenne Angel	381	19.1	+4.2
Campaign Against Pedestrianisation of Oxford Street	Michael Dunn	355	17.8	N/A
Liberal Democrats	Alistair Barr	250	12.5	+0.6
Liberal Democrats	Andrew Byrne	229	11.5	+1.7
Liberal Democrats	Stefan Nardi-Hiebl	195	9.8	+2.9
Green	Zack Polanski	165	8.3	−8.2
Majority		706	35.4	
Turnout		5782	34.7	+5.9
Conservative hold		Swing		
Conservative hold		Swing		
Conservative hold		Swing		

=== Queen's Park ===
Queen's Park (3)
Party	Candidate	Votes	%	±%
Labour	Patricia McAllister *	2,248	76.4	+6.5
Labour	Paul Dimoldenberg *	2,210	75.1	+8.0
Labour	Hamza Taouzzale	2,038	69.3	+3.6
Conservative	Sarah Rick-Harris	472	16.0	−3.8
Conservative	Timothy Cohen	418	14.2	−0.5
Conservative	Laila Dupuy	391	13.3	−0.7
Liberal Democrats	Andrew New	220	7.5	N/A
Liberal Democrats	Jane Smithard	193	6.6	N/A
Liberal Democrats	Robert Cottrell	191	6.5	N/A
Majority		1566	53.3	
Turnout		8381	36.2	+0.8
Labour hold		Swing		
Labour hold		Swing		
Labour hold		Swing		

=== Regent's Park ===
Regent's Park (3)
Party	Candidate	Votes	%	±%
Conservative	Robert Rigby *	1,445	52.7	−0.2
Conservative	Gotz Mohindra *	1,403	51.1	+4.6
Conservative	Paul Swaddle	1,394	50.8	−3.4
Labour	Janet Seale	1,004	36.6	+0.9
Labour	Hussain Ahmed	946	34.5	+4.3
Labour	Liam Taggart	945	34.4	+4.6
Liberal Democrats	Kathryn Kerle	236	8.6	−1.2
Green	Vivien Lichtenstein	204	7.4	−7.1
Liberal Democrats	Julian Sims	196	7.1	N/A
Liberal Democrats	Sam Peterson	191	7.0	N/A
Majority		390	14.2	
Turnout		7964	40.3	+9.1
Conservative hold		Swing		
Conservative hold		Swing		
Conservative hold		Swing		

=== St James's ===
St James's (3)
Party	Candidate	Votes	%	±%
Conservative	Mark Shearer	1,398	52.5	+7.9
Conservative	Louise Hyams *	1,376	51.7	+3.2
Conservative	Tim Mitchell *	1,373	51.5	+4.3
Labour	Georgina Newson	854	32.1	+4.5
Labour	Dorothy Edwin	830	31.2	+6.0
Labour	Zayna Ali	815	30.6	+8.4
Liberal Democrats	Gabrielle Ward-Smith	321	12.0	+1.4
Liberal Democrats	Paul Diggory	311	11.7	+2.1
Green	Sean Ironside	235	8.8	−6.8
Liberal Democrats	Freddie Poser	232	8.7	−0.2
Majority		519	19.4	
Turnout		7745	37.1	+7.5
Conservative hold		Swing		
Conservative hold		Swing		
Conservative hold		Swing		

=== Tachbrook ===
Tachbrook (3)
Party	Candidate	Votes	%	±%
Conservative	Angela Harvey *	1,409	52.1	+2.5
Conservative	Jim Glen	1,400	51.8	+1.8
Conservative	James Spencer	1,326	49.1	−0.4
Labour	Gillian Arrindell	1,051	38.9	+13.2
Labour	Terry Harper	1,008	37.3	+13.0
Labour	William Thomson	951	35.2	+12.9
Liberal Democrats	Sarah Tebbit	236	8.7	−1.8
Liberal Democrats	Sophie Service	210	7.8	−1.3
Liberal Democrats	Paul Pettinger	209	7.7	+1.7
Majority		275	10.2	
Turnout		7800	47.3	+9.9
Conservative hold		Swing		
Conservative hold		Swing		
Conservative hold		Swing		

=== Vincent Square ===
Vincent Square (3)
Party	Candidate	Votes	%	±%
Conservative	David Harvey *	1,679	50.9	−1.2
Conservative	Danny Chalkley *	1,594	48.3	−1.5
Conservative	Selina Short	1,579	47.9	−0.1
Labour	Justin Jones	1,263	38.3	+8.2
Labour	Henry Tufnell	1,155	35.0	+6.1
Labour	Ananthi Paskaralingam	1,148	34.8	+8.6
Green	Stephanie Landymore	326	9.9	−7.2
Liberal Democrats	Andrew Rogers	271	8.2	N/A
Liberal Democrats	James Morgan	265	8.0	N/A
Liberal Democrats	Russell Kirk	247	7.5	N/A
Majority		316	9.6	
Turnout		9527	45.4	+8.9
Conservative hold		Swing		
Conservative hold		Swing		
Conservative hold		Swing		

=== Warwick ===
Warwick (3)
Party	Candidate	Votes	%	±%
Conservative	Nickie Aiken *	1,575	61.8	+1.2
Conservative	Jacqui Wilkinson *	1,473	57.8	+1.3
Conservative	Christabel Flight *	1,439	56.5	+2.8
Labour	Shelly Asquith	716	28.1	+6.0
Labour	Bren Albiston	692	27.1	+7.8
Labour	Andrew Taylor	648	25.4	+6.2
Liberal Democrats	Stephanie Tyrer	282	11.1	+3.0
Liberal Democrats	Mark Platt	248	9.7	+2.6
Liberal Democrats	David Derrick	244	9.6	+1.9
CPA	Gabriela Palacios	39	1.5	N/A
Majority		723	28.4	
Turnout		7356	40.6	+5.2
Conservative hold		Swing		
Conservative hold		Swing		
Conservative hold		Swing		

Results are compared with the 2014 council election, not the 2015 by-election.

=== West End ===
West End (3)
Party	Candidate	Votes	%	±%
Conservative	Timothy Barnes	990	43.2	−11.7
Labour	Pancho Lewis	984	42.9	+18.7
Conservative	Jonathan Glanz *	973	42.5	−3.8
Labour	Patrick Lilley	947	41.3	+18.0
Labour	Caroline Saville	927	40.4	+19.4
Conservative	Hillary Su	868	37.9	−11.0
Campaign Against Pedestrianisation of Oxford Street	Ronald Whelan	291	12.7	N/A
Green	Minne Fry	188	8.2	−8.3
Liberal Democrats	Sophie Taylor	178	7.8	±0.0
Liberal Democrats	Florian Chevoppe-Verdier	142	6.2	N/A
Liberal Democrats	Alan Ravenscroft	127	5.5	−2.6
Majority		26	1.2	
Turnout		6615	31.1	+1.2
Conservative hold		Swing		
Labour gain from Conservative		Swing		
Conservative hold		Swing		

=== Westbourne ===
Westbourne (3)
Party	Candidate	Votes	%	±%
Labour	David Boothroyd *	1,740	68.8	+1.6
Labour	Adam Hug *	1,710	67.6	+1.2
Labour	Papya Qureshi *	1,704	67.4	+6.1
Conservative	Angus Wyatt	421	16.7	−1.8
Conservative	Thomas Davies	412	16.3	+0.5
Conservative	Theodore Roos	385	15.2	−0.4
Green	Holly Robinson	219	8.7	−6.2
Liberal Democrats	Mary Armstrong	189	7.5	N/A
Liberal Democrats	Anthony Williams	164	6.5	N/A
Liberal Democrats	Angelos-Stylianos Chryssogelos	163	6.4	N/A
Majority		1283	52.2	+7.6
Turnout		7107	37.8	+5.7
Labour hold		Swing		
Labour hold		Swing		
Labour hold		Swing		

== By-elections ==
Lancaster Gate by-election, 22 November 2018
Party	Candidate	Votes	%	±%
Conservative	Margot Bright	913	47.2	−1.5
Labour	Angela Piddock	684	35.4	−1.0
Liberal Democrats	Sally Gray	275	14.2	−0.7
Green	Zack Polanski	62	3.2	+3.2
Majority		229	11.8	−0.5
Turnout		1,934	27.75	−10.3
Conservative hold		Swing		

The by-election was called following the resignation of Cllr Robert Davis.

Churchill by-election, 6 May 2021
Party	Candidate	Votes	%	±%
Labour	Liza Begum	1,340	45.6	
Conservative	Shaista Miah	1,016	34.6	
Liberal Democrats	Vikas Aggarwal	295	10.0	
Green	Zack Polanski	186	6.3	
For Britain	Andrew Cavell	99	3.4	
Majority		324	11.0	
Turnout		2,936		
Labour hold		Swing		

The by-election was called following the resignation of Cllr Andrea Mann.

== See also ==
- 2018 Queen's Park Community Council election held the same day
