= 2002 Westminster City Council election =

2002 English local election

- May 2, 2002

all 60 seats up for election to Westminster City Council 31 seats needed for a majority
- Registered: 133,281
- Turnout: 36,480, 27.37% (▼4.62)

	First party	Second party	Third party
Leader	Simon H. Milton	Unknown	Unknown
Party	Conservative	Labour	Liberal Democrats
Leader since	2000	Unknown	Unknown
Leader's seat	Lancaster Gate	Unknown	Unknown
Last election	47 seats, 55.02%	13 seats, 33.80%	0 seats, 9.03%
Seats won	48	12	0
Seat change	▲1	▼1	Steady
Popular vote	60,245	29,461	11,272
Percentage	58.84%	28.78%	11.01%
Swing	▲3.82	▼5.02	▲1.98
Council control before election
Conservative
Council control after election
Conservative

The 2002 Westminster City Council election took place on May 2, 2002, to elect 60 members of Westminster City Council. It resulted in a Conservative majority.

== Background ==
Like all the other 31 London boroughs, the City of Westminster went through a major redistricting prior to the 2002 local elections, merging several wards, eliminating others as well as creating new wards. The changes were as follows:

=== New wards ===
- Abbey Road (3 seats)
- Marylebone High Street (3 seats)
- Tachbrook (3 seats)
- Vincent Square (3 seats)
- Warwick (3 seats)

=== Eliminated wards ===
- Baker Street (2 seats)
- Cavendish (3 seats)
- Hamilton Terrace (2 seats)
- Lord's (2 seats)
- Millbank (3 seats)
- St George's (3 seats)
- Victoria (2 seats)

=== Merged wards ===
- Knightsbridge (2 seats) and Belgrave (2 seats) - Knightsbridge and Belgravia (3 seats)

=== Expanded wards ===
- St James's - Increased from 2 to 3 seats
- West End - Increased from 2 to 3 seats

== Election results ==
2002 Westminster City Council local elections
Party	Seats	Gains	Losses	Net gain/loss	Seats %	Votes %	Votes	+/−
Conservative	48	23 (Note: several wards were eliminated an merged in between this election and the previous election)	22	▲1	80.00	58.84	60,245	▲3.82
Labour	12	0	1	▼1	20.00	28.78	29,461	▼5.02
Liberal Democrats	0	0	0	Steady	0.00	11.01	11,272	▲1.98
Green	0	0	0	Steady	0.00	0.67	685	▲0.37
Independent	0	0	0	Steady	0.00	0.51	526	▼0.11
London Socialist	0	0	0	Steady	0.00	0.19	193	New
Total	60						102,382	

After the election the composition of the council was as follows:

↓
12	48
Labour	Conservative

== Ward results ==
(*) - Indicates an incumbent candidate

(†) - Indicates an incumbent candidate standing in a different ward

=== Abbey Road ===
Abbey Road (3)
Party	Candidate	Votes	%	±%
Conservative	Judith Warner^{†} (Note: Warner was a sitting councillor representing the Hamilton Terrace ward)	1,269	55.85	New
Conservative	Cyril Nemeth^{†} (Note: Nemeth and Gardner were sitting councillors representing the Lord's ward)	1,265		
Conservative	Kevin Gardner^{†}	1,230		
Labour	Katharine Hoskyns	338	14.20	New
Labour	Phillida Inman	313		
Liberal Democrats	Robert Bell	308	13.71	New
Labour	Margherita Rendel	306		
Independent	Elizabeth Maxwell	217	9.66	New
Independent	Michele Staniland	148	6.59	New
Registered electors		6,872		New
Turnout		1,901	27.66	New
Rejected ballots		7	0.37	New
Conservative win (new seat)				
Conservative win (new seat)				
Conservative win (new seat)				

=== Bayswater ===
Bayswater (3)
Party	Candidate	Votes	%	±%
Conservative	Frixos Tombolis*	911	52.50	▲2.93
Conservative	Michael Brahams*	908		
Conservative	Brian Connell	867		
Labour	Timothy Nolan	558	30.16	▼5.30
Labour	Lewis Baston	510		
Labour	Daphne Segre	475		
Liberal Democrats	Morag Beattle	319	17.34	▲8.62
Liberal Democrats	Jacqueline Castles	293		
Liberal Democrats	Monica Kendall	275		
Registered electors		6,978		▲419
Turnout		1,789	25.64	▼7.81
Rejected ballots		13	0.73	▲0.69
Conservative win (new boundaries)				
Conservative win (new boundaries)				
Conservative win (new boundaries)				

=== Bryanston and Dorset Square ===
Bryanston and Dorset Square (3)
Party	Candidate	Votes	%	±%
Conservative	Audrey Lewis	1,157	68.53	New
Conservative	Carolyn Keen	1,147		
Conservative	Angela Hooper^{†} (Note: Hooper was a sitting councillor representing the Baker Street ward)	1,123		
Labour	Brenda Buxton	295	16.72	New
Labour	David Bradby	277		
Labour	Derek Buckland	264		
Liberal Democrats	Alexis Batterbee	260	14.76	New
Liberal Democrats	Nikhil Seth	232		
Registered electors		6,800		New
Turnout		3,656	53.76	New
Rejected ballots		6	0.16	New
Conservative win (new seat)				
Conservative win (new seat)				
Conservative win (new seat)				

=== Church Street ===
Church Street (3)
Party	Candidate	Votes	%	±%
Labour	Barbara Grahame*	969	59.17	▼1.60
Labour	Antony Mothersdale* (Note: Mothersdale was elected in a by-election triggered by the resignation of Cllr Ron Harley in 2000)	921		
Labour	Murad Qureshi*	905		
Conservative	Ian Balcombe	460	27.94	▼0.45
Conservative	Daniel Defoe	450		
Conservative	Stephen Garside	410		
Liberal Democrats	Iain Black	211	12.89	▲2.05
Liberal Democrats	Niall Macmahon	195		
Registered electors		6,450		▼376
Turnout		1,659	25.72	▲0.54
Rejected ballots		17	1.02	▼0.08
Labour win (new boundaries)				
Labour win (new boundaries)				
Labour win (new boundaries)				

=== Churchill ===
Churchill (3)
Party	Candidate	Votes	%	±%
Conservative	Andrew Havery	1,378	66.87	▲11.01
Conservative	John Wyatt	1,364		
Conservative	Sarah Richardson	1,361		
Labour	Josephine Abercrombie	499	23.22	▼8.93
Labour	Margaret Cavalla	486		
Labour	Cass Cass-Horne	444		
Liberal Democrats	Rhoda Torres	214	10.11	▲3.70
Liberal Democrats	Colin Bell	211		
Liberal Democrats	Michael Holmans	197		
Registered electors		6,146		▼513
Turnout		2,222	36.15	▼9.16
Rejected ballots		8	0.36	▼0.36
Conservative win (new boundaries)				
Conservative win (new boundaries)				
Conservative win (new boundaries)				

=== Harrow Road ===
Harrow Road (3)
Party	Candidate	Votes	%	±%
Labour	Guthrie McKie* (Note: McKie and Ohene-Djan were both elected in a by-election triggered by the resignations of Cllr Jillian Selbourne and Cllr Gary Martin in 2000)	1,029	52.19	▼13.60
Labour	Sharan Tabari	952		
Labour	Josephine Ohene-Djan*	942		
Conservative	Andrew Reid	362	17.44	▼5.41
Conservative	Jeremy Fox	328		
Green	Paul Miller	289	15.48	New
Conservative	Edward Vaizey	287		
Liberal Democrats	Melissa Foux	278	14.89	▲3.54
Registered electors		6,568		▼834
Turnout		1,642	25.00	▼0.84
Rejected ballots		5	0.30	▼1.01
Labour win (new boundaries)				
Labour win (new boundaries)				
Labour win (new boundaries)				

=== Hyde Park ===
Hyde Park (3)
Party	Candidate	Votes	%	±%
Conservative	Pamela Batty*	1,095	72.34	▲4.10
Conservative	Anne Mallinson*	1,071		
Conservative	Colin Barrow	1,066		
Labour	Louis Al-Dhahir	250	15.62	▲0.41
Labour	Prosser-Wegg	236		
Liberal Democrats	Barbara Bridge	231	12.04	▲2.53
Labour	Joseph Ogden	212		
Liberal Democrats	Elizabeth Mackeith	157		
Liberal Democrats	Esther Stansfield	150		
Registered electors		6,636		▲1,279
Turnout		1,590	23.96	▼1.95
Rejected ballots		9	0.57	▲0.28
Conservative win (new boundaries)				
Conservative win (new boundaries)				
Conservative win (new boundaries)				

=== Knightsbridge and Belgravia ===
Knightsbridge and Belgravia (3)
Party	Candidate	Votes	%	±%
Conservative	Angela Harvey	1,126	77.96	New
Conservative	Elizabeth Blois^{†} (Note: Blois and Longworth were sitting councillors representing the Belgrave ward)	1,124		
Conservative	Catherine Longworth^{†}	1,114		
Liberal Democrats	Tania Chislett	144	9.36	New
Liberal Democrats	Simon Bryden-Brook	130		
Liberal Democrats	Angela Whitelegge	130		
Green	Thomas Bewley	112	7.79	New
Labour	Peter Cavalla	74	4.89	New
Labour	Angela Forrester	72		
Labour	Malwine Eyre	65		
Registered electors		6,401		New
Turnout		1,419	22.17	New
Rejected ballots		4	0.28	New
Conservative win (new seat)				
Conservative win (new seat)				
Conservative win (new seat)				

=== Lancaster Gate ===
Lancaster Gate (3)
Party	Candidate	Votes	%	±%
Conservative	Susan Burbridge^{†} (Note: Burbridge was a sitting councillor representing the Maida Vale ward)	1,180	66.51	▼0.46
Conservative	Robert Davis*	1,160		
Conservative	Simon Milton*	1,128		
Labour	Elizabeth Whitmore	332	18.05	▼4.38
Labour	Tony Rea	310		
Labour	Stephen Gruneberg	299		
Liberal Democrats	Susan Baring	295	15.44	▲4.84
Liberal Democrats	Monica Wilson	269		
Liberal Democrats	Mark Gray	241		
Registered electors		7,408		▲1,801
Turnout		1,841	24.85	▼1.35
Rejected ballots		9	0.49	▼0.39
Conservative win (new boundaries)				
Conservative win (new boundaries)				
Conservative win (new boundaries)				

=== Little Venice ===
Little Venice (3)
Party	Candidate	Votes	%	±%
Conservative	Melvyn Caplan*	1,177	65.99	▲4.67
Conservative	Ian Adams	1,159		
Conservative	Barbara Schmeling*	1,147		
Labour	Paul O'Donnell	395	21.71	▼8.83
Labour	Beryl Leaver	377		
Labour	Basma Elsafi	374		
Liberal Democrats	Michael Ryan	236	12.30	▲4.16
Liberal Democrats	Michael Dearden	214		
Liberal Democrats	Philip Wardle	199		
Registered electors		6,645		▲547
Turnout		1,843	27.74	▼9.86
Rejected ballots		8	0.43	▼0.40
Conservative win (new boundaries)				
Conservative win (new boundaries)				
Conservative win (new boundaries)				

=== Maida Vale ===
Maida Vale (3)
Party	Candidate	Votes	%	±%
Conservative	Janet Prendergast*	1,179	52.74	▼4.18
Conservative	Ronald Raymond-Cox*	1,108		
Conservative	Alastair Moss	1,066		
Labour	David Lancaster	780	35.98	▼0.04
Labour	Syed Hayat	762		
Labour	Albert Catterall	745		
Liberal Democrats	Anne Couchman	279	11.28	▲4.22
Liberal Democrats	Robert Scott	237		
Liberal Democrats	Zena Lutrin	201		
Registered electors		6,728		▲4
Turnout		2,196	32.64	▼6.19
Rejected ballots		10	0.46	▼0.27
Conservative win (new boundaries)				
Conservative win (new boundaries)				
Conservative win (new boundaries)				

=== Marylebone High Street ===
Marylebone High Street (3)
Party	Candidate	Votes	%	±%
Conservative	Harvey Marshall^{†} (Note: Marshall and Page were sitting councillors representing the Cavendish ward)	1,328	71.79	New
Conservative	Mark Page^{†}	1,295		
Conservative	Michael Vearncombe	1,257		
Liberal Democrats	Susan Stocker	278	14.04	New
Labour	Mair Garside	264	14.17	New
Labour	Owain Garside	255		
Labour	David Worton	247		
Liberal Democrats	David Brewin	246		
Liberal Democrats	Michael Sibley	235		
Registered electors		6,751		New
Turnout		1,899	28.13	New
Rejected ballots		6	0.32	New
Conservative win (new seat)				
Conservative win (new seat)				
Conservative win (new seat)				

=== Queen's Park ===
Queen's Park (3)
Party	Candidate	Votes	%	±%
Labour	Barrie Taylor*	1,154	61.40	▲9.59
Labour	Paul Dimoldenberg*	1,122		
Labour	Mushtaq Qureshi*	1,080		
Conservative	Peter Prendergast	318	16.94	▲0.64
Conservative	Nita Fernandez	317		
Conservative	Richard Phibbs	291		
Liberal Democrats	Jonathan Wardle	219	11.06	▲7.22
London Socialist	Monia Kefi	193	10.59	New
Liberal Democrats	Bernard Silver	184		
Registered electors		6,992		▲716
Turnout		1,836	26.26	▼1.70
Rejected ballots		12	0.65	▲0.89
Labour win (new boundaries)				
Labour win (new boundaries)				
Labour win (new boundaries)				

=== Regent's Park ===
Regent's Park (3)
Party	Candidate	Votes	%	±%
Conservative	Daniel Astaire* (Note: Astaire was elected in a by-election triggered by the resignation of Cllr Jonathan Djanogly in 2001)	1,145	60.36	▼7.56
Conservative	Gwyneth Hampson	1,138		
Conservative	Timothy Joiner*	1,079		
Labour	Peter Denton	410	20.50	▼2.31
Labour	Joseph Thomas	375		
Labour	David Woodgate	357		
Liberal Democrats	Richard de Ste Croix	207	10.47	▲1.20
Liberal Democrats	Herbert Hartwell	199		
Liberal Democrats	Alan Thompson	177		
Independent	Nasir Qureshi	161	8.67	New
Registered electors		6,678		▲564
Turnout		1,860	27.85	▼6.32
Rejected ballots		7	0.38	▼0.19
Conservative win (new boundaries)				
Conservative win (new boundaries)				
Conservative win (new boundaries)				

=== St James's ===
St James's (3)
Party	Candidate	Votes	%	±%
Conservative	Louise Hyams*	1,056	58.99	▼5.84
Conservative	Timothy Mitchell^{†} (Note: Mitchell was a sitting councillor representing the Victoria ward)	1,034		
Conservative	Alexander Nicoll*	977		
Labour	Stephanie Ayres	355	19.72	▼15.45
Labour	Lynda Giddings	343		
Labour	Pamela Eyre	327		
Liberal Democrats	Marie-Louise Rossi	255	13.10	New
Liberal Democrats	Nigel Bliss	199		
Green	Peter Budge	144	8.19	New
Green	Lydia Howitt	140		
Registered electors		6,439		▲2,892
Turnout		1,699	26.39	▼7.13
Rejected ballots		16	0.94	▼0.57
Conservative win (new boundaries)				
Conservative win (new boundaries)				
Conservative win (new seat)				

=== Tachbrook ===
Tachbrook (3)
Party	Candidate	Votes	%	±%
Conservative	Alan Bradley^{†} (Note: Bradley was a sitting councillor representing the St George's ward)	1,451	62.69	New
Conservative	Nicholas Evans	1,377		
Conservative	Dominic Schofield	1,369		
Labour	Charles Campion	583	25.01	New
Labour	William Thomson	548		
Labour	Michael Dumigan	543		
Liberal Democrats	Josephine Hayes	300	12.30	New
Liberal Democrats	John Stevens	249		
Registered electors		6,194		New
Turnout		2,313	37.34	New
Rejected ballots		8	0.35	New
Conservative win (new seat)				
Conservative win (new seat)				
Conservative win (new seat)				

=== Vincent Square ===
Vincent Square (3)
Party	Candidate	Votes	%	±%
Conservative	Duncan Sandys	1,351	67.74	New
Conservative	Danny Chalkley	1,308		
Conservative	Justin Powell-Tuck	1,270		
Labour	Steven Friel	406	19.90	New
Labour	Gillian Guy	391		
Labour	Alen Mathewson	357		
Liberal Democrats	Margaret Lang	264	12.36	New
Liberal Democrats	Janice Taverne	230		
Liberal Democrats	Kathleen Hobbins	223		
Registered electors		6,199		New
Turnout		2,048	33.04	New
Rejected ballots		6	0.29	New
Conservative win (new seat)				
Conservative win (new seat)				
Conservative win (new seat)				

=== Warwick ===
Warwick (3)
Party	Candidate	Votes	%	±%
Conservative	Matthew Mitchell	1,282	70.00	New
Conservative	David Clark	1,265		
Conservative	Christopher Malthouse^{†} (Note: Malthouse was a sitting councillor representing the St George's ward)	1,259		
Labour	Nicholas Gartside	318	14.99	New
Liberal Democrats	Anthony Brett-Jones	283	15.01	New
Liberal Democrats	Keith Dugmore	261		
Labour	Violet Spencer	251		
Labour	Babette Payne	246		
Registered electors		6,488		New
Turnout		1,846	28.45	New
Rejected ballots		8	0.43	New
Conservative win (new seat)				
Conservative win (new seat)				
Conservative win (new seat)				

=== West End ===
West End (3)
Party	Candidate	Votes	%	±%
Conservative	Glenys Roberts* (Note: Roberts was elected in a by-election triggered by the resignation of Cllr Glenys Roberts in 1999)	949	64.65	▲23.91
Conservative	Ian Wilder^{†} (Note: Wilder was a sitting councillor representing the Baker Street ward)	938		
Conservative	John Cox	919		
Labour	David Bleda	409	22.19	▲8.84
Labour	Harold Brookstone	340		
Labour	Richard Hearnden	214		
Liberal Democrats	Michael Pepperrell	198	13.16	▲2.03
Liberal Democrats	Ian Steers	191		
Liberal Democrats	Susan Kendrick	182		
Registered electors		6,726		▲1,910
Turnout		1,577	23.45	▼7.45
Rejected ballots		4	0.25	▼0.02
Conservative win (new boundaries)				
Conservative win (new boundaries)				
Conservative win (new seat)				

=== Westbourne ===
Westbourne (3)
Party	Candidate	Votes	%	±%
Labour	David Boothroyd	969	62.48	▲7.31
Labour	Simon Stockill^{†} (Note: Stockill was a sitting councillor representing the Westbourne ward. He replaced Cllr Nicola Russell in a by-election triggered by here resignation in 1999)	923		
Labour	Vinod d'Cruz	908		
Conservative	Alexander Story	399	24.44	▼2.30
Conservative	Mary Agrafiotou	365		
Conservative	Iheoma Oteh	331		
Liberal Democrats	Martin Thompson	203	13.08	▲1.51
Liberal Democrats	Anthony Williams	202		
Liberal Democrats	Vera Williams	181		
Registered electors		7,182		▼214
Turnout		1,644	22.89	▼2.52
Rejected ballots		18	1.09	▲0.82
Labour win (new boundaries)				
Labour win (new boundaries)				
Labour win (new boundaries)				
