= Marble Arch =

Monument in London, England

Coordinates: 51°30′47″N 0°09′32″W

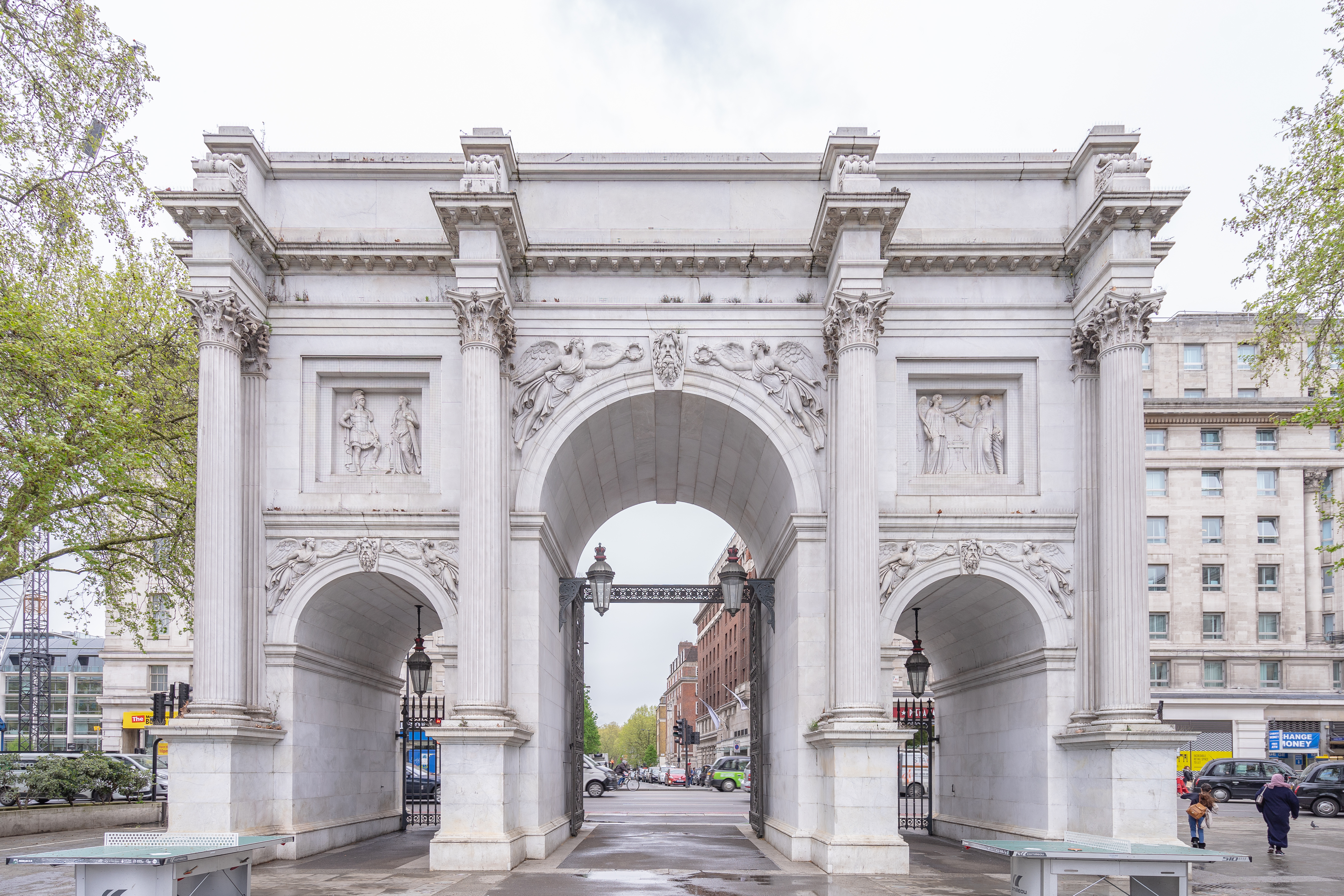
View north through the Arch to Great Cumberland Place with the Cumberland Hotel to its right, 2018

The Marble Arch is a 19th-century white marble-faced triumphal arch in London, England. The structure was designed by John Nash in 1827 as the state entrance to the cour d'honneur of Buckingham Palace; it stood near the site of what is today the three-bayed, central projection of the palace containing the well-known balcony.

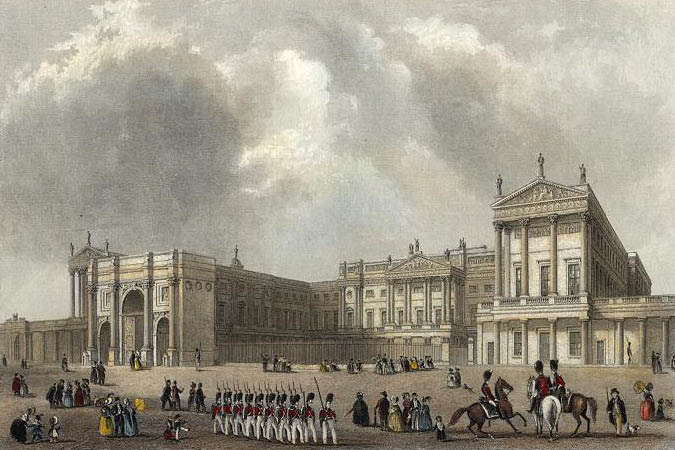
Marble Arch (left) as the state entrance to the courtyard of Buckingham Palace, 1837

In the 1840s, with a growing family and entourage, Queen Victoria sought to expand Buckingham Palace. A front range was proposed, which would include the site of the Arch. In 1851, on the initiative of architect and urban planner Decimus Burton, a former pupil of John Nash, the arch was relocated to its current site, near the northeast corner of Hyde Park.

The arch gives its name to the area surrounding it, particularly the southern portion of Edgware Road and also to the underground station. The arch is no longer part of the Royal Parks and is maintained by Westminster City Council.

== Design and construction ==
Nash's three-arch design is based on that of the Arch of Constantine in Rome and the Arc de Triomphe du Carrousel in Paris. The triumphal arch is faced with Carrara marble with embellishments of marble extracted from quarries near Seravezza in Tuscany.

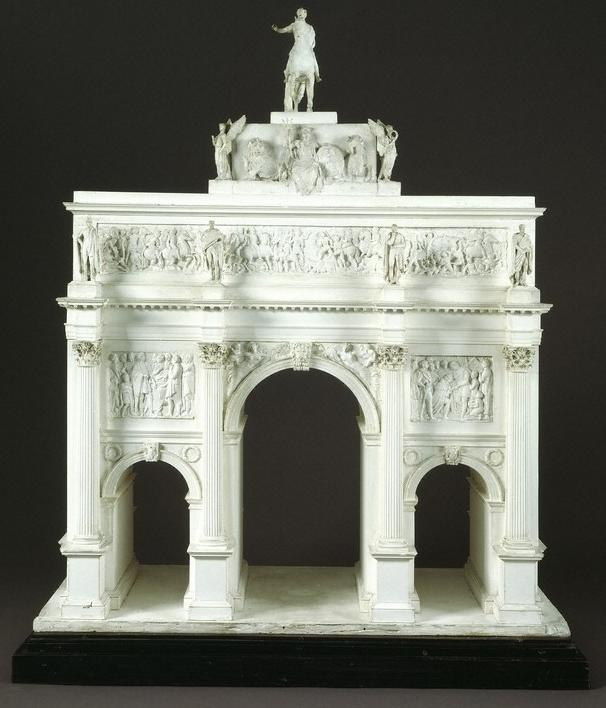
Model of John Nash's original design for the arch, now in the Victoria and Albert Museum in London

John Flaxman was chosen to make the commemorative sculpture. After his death in 1826, the commission was divided amongst Sir Richard Westmacott, Edward Hodges Baily and J. C. F. Rossi. In 1829, a bronze equestrian statue of George IV was commissioned from Sir Francis Chantrey, with the intention of placing it on top of the arch.

Construction began in 1827, but was cut short in 1830 after the death of the spendthrift King George IV. The rising costs were unacceptable to the new king, William IV, who later tried to offload the uncompleted Buckingham Palace onto Parliament as a substitute for the recently destroyed Palace of Westminster.

Work restarted in 1832, this time under the supervision of Edward Blore, who greatly reduced Nash's planned attic stage and omitted its sculpture, including the statue of George IV. The arch was completed in 1833.

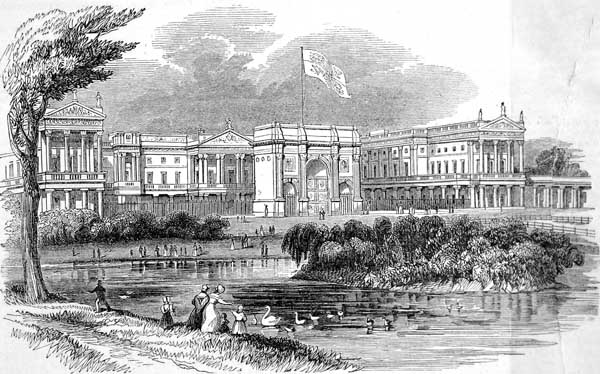
Buckingham Palace from St James's Park,1842

Some of the unused sculpture, including parts of Westmacott's frieze of Waterloo and the Nelson panels, were used at Buckingham Palace. His victory statues and Rossi's relief of Europe and Asia were used at the National Gallery. In 1843 the equestrian statue of George IV was installed on one of the pedestals in Trafalgar Square.

The white marble soon lost its light colouring in the polluted London atmosphere. In 1847, Sharpe's London Magazine described it as "discoloured by smoke and damp, and in appearance resembling a huge sugar erection in a confectioner's shop window."

The arch is 45 feet (14 m) high, and measures 60 by 30 feet (18.3 by 9.1 m) east-west by north–south.

== Relocation ==
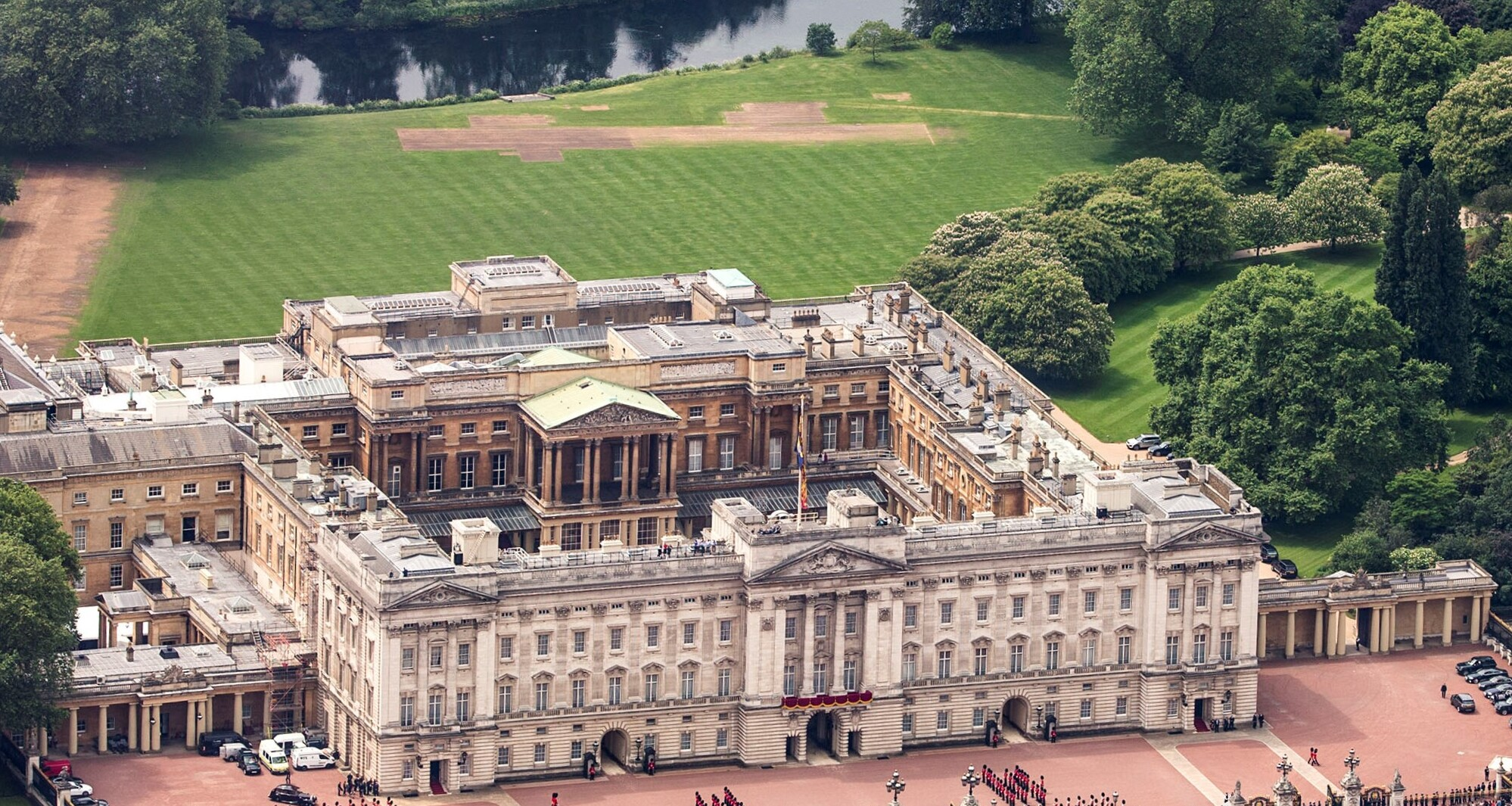
Aerial View of Buckingham Palace, 2016

Buckingham Palace remained unoccupied, and for the most part, unfinished until it was hurriedly completed on the accession of Queen Victoria in 1837. Within a few years, it was deemed too small to accommodate the large court and the Queen's expanding family. The solution was to enlarge the palace by enclosing the cour d'honneur with a new east range. This new façade is today the public face of the palace and shields the inner façades containing friezes and marbles matching and complementing those of the arch.

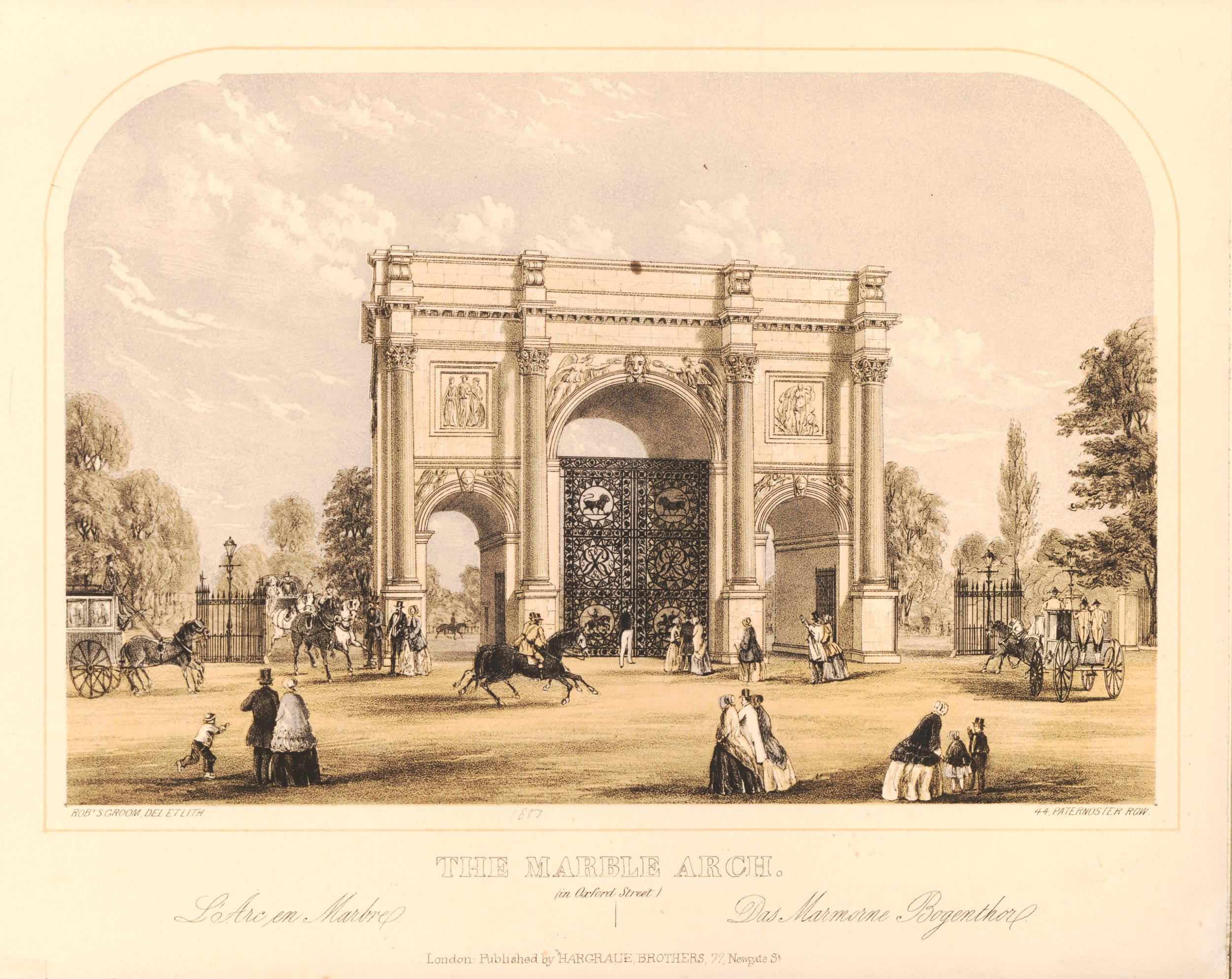
View of the Arch in 1851 as the ceremonial north entrance to Hyde Park

The arch was dismantled in 1847 and rebuilt by Thomas Cubitt as a ceremonial entrance to the northeast corner of Hyde Park at Cumberland Gate. The reconstruction was completed in March 1851.

Three small rooms in the attic storey of the rebuilt arch were used as a police station from 1851 until at least 1968 (John Betjeman visited it during a television programme in 1968 and referred to it as a fully functional police station). It firstly housed officers of the Royal Parks Constabulary and later the Metropolitan Police. One policeman stationed there during the early 1860s was Samuel Parkes, who won the Victoria Cross in the Charge of the Light Brigade in 1854, during the Crimean War.

== Separation from Hyde Park ==
The carriage drives around Hyde Park have long been used as quasi-public roads but they are restricted to private vehicles and the park is closed overnight. Until its conversion to the northbound carriageway of Park Lane in 1961, the East Carriage Drive ran parallel to Park Lane and carried substantial traffic in both directions between Hyde Park Corner and Marble Arch.

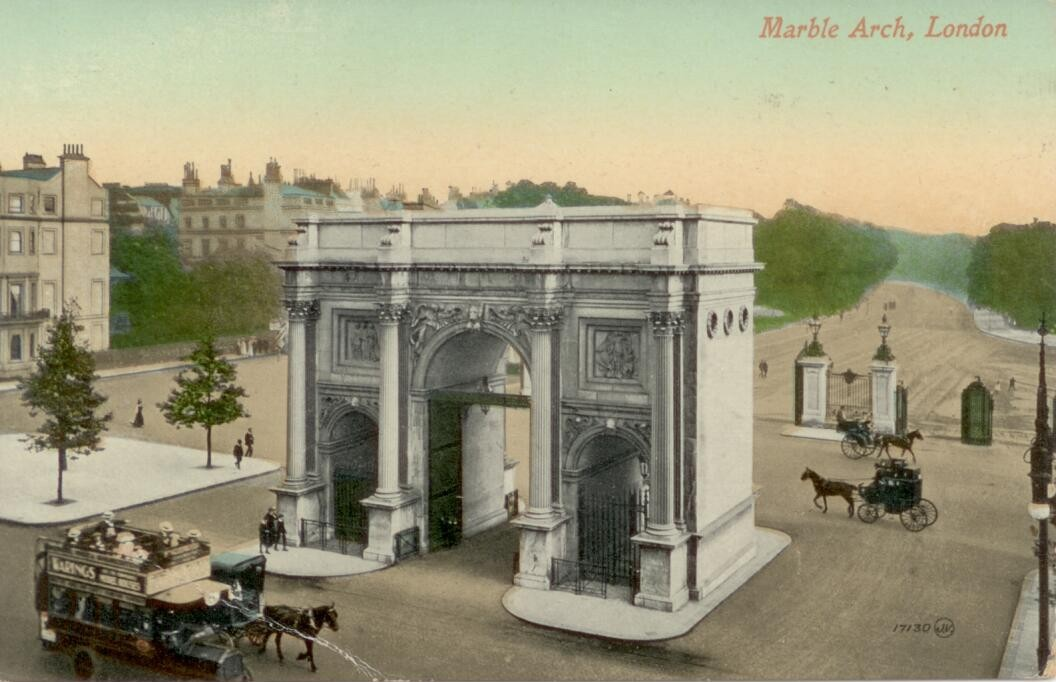
Marble Arch from the north just after the creation of a two-way road to its south in 1908

In 1905 the Royal Commission on London Traffic noted that congestion at Marble Arch could be relieved by enlarging the space where the different lines of traffic converged. The Advisory Report proposed moving the Arch and the boundary of the Park south to create the larger space. Instead, in 1908 the Arch was left where it was and the boundary of the Park was moved south. A two-way road, Tyburn Way, was created between the Arch and the boundary of the Park, leaving the Arch surrounded by roads.

In 1926 Marble Arch was one of the first sites in London where "gyratory traffic control", i.e. one-way clockwise flow, was introduced. The traffic islands were consolidated into a single large one, with the Arch at its centre. At this point, Marble Arch did become "stranded in a roundabout".

== Dualling of Park Lane ==
In 1938 Sir Charles Bressey wrote in The Highway Development Survey 1937:

Park Lane ... in its present state, is ill adapted to receive any additional influx of traffic... The form which I recommend that the improvement should take is the creation of a twin carriageway road by the inclusion in Park Lane of the "ring" road which now lies within the Park railings. By this means a handsome and spacious boulevard would be created, the two carriageways being separated by a strip of grass and trees...

Although it was not implemented for more than twenty years, the die had been cast. A 1951 London road atlas showed the proposed roundabout at the southern end of the dual carriageway north of Apsley House and its connexion to Piccadilly through the site of the mansions to its east. Before work could begin, an Act of Parliament was required to take land from the Royal Parks (land was also being taken from Green Park for the roundabout at Hyde Park Corner).

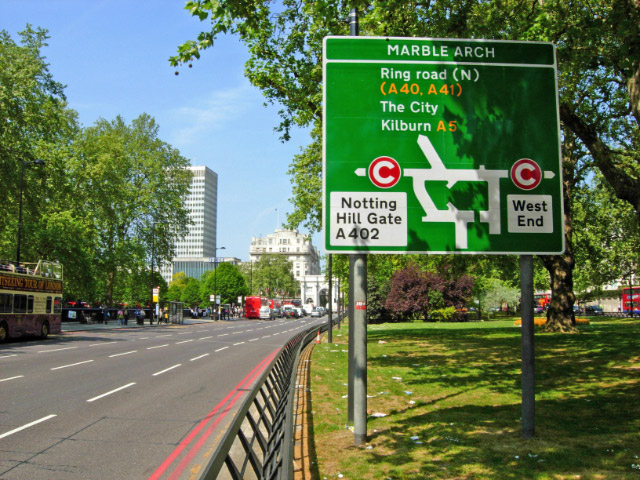
Northbound carriageway of Park Lane aligned on the ceremonial route to Buckingham Palace, 2009

The Park Lane Improvement Act 1958 (6 & 7 Eliz. 2. c. 63) was duly enacted. During the passage of the Act, the possibility of providing an underpass instead of a roundabout was dismissed due to excessive cost and the need to demolish buildings on Edgware Road. As part of the scheme, gardens were laid out around the arch on what was now a much larger traffic island.

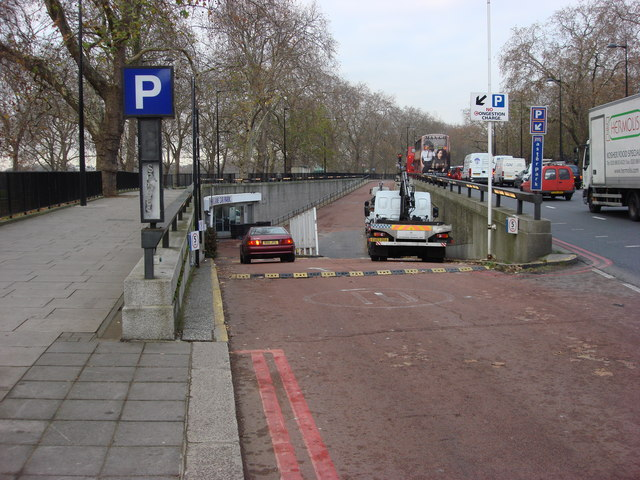
Entrance from Park Lane to the underground car park, 2007

The works were implemented between 1960 and 1962. In 1961 Park Lane became one-way southbound with the East Carriage Drive becoming one-way northbound. A new, larger rectangular roundabout was created around the Arch with a south-to-north short-cut across its centre (see map). Traffic turning right from Park Lane into Oxford Street could use this to avoid having to go the whole way round; traffic for Edgware Road could not. The southern and western sides of the rectangle were given the name Cumberland Gate; the name Tyburn Way was reassigned to the south-to-north short cut.

The East Carriage Drive had provided parking places on both sides. These ceased to be available. In their place, a large underground car park was constructed beneath Hyde Park extending from Mount Street in the south to Cumberland Gate and from Stanhope Place in the west to Park Lane.

== The Enlarged Roundabout ==
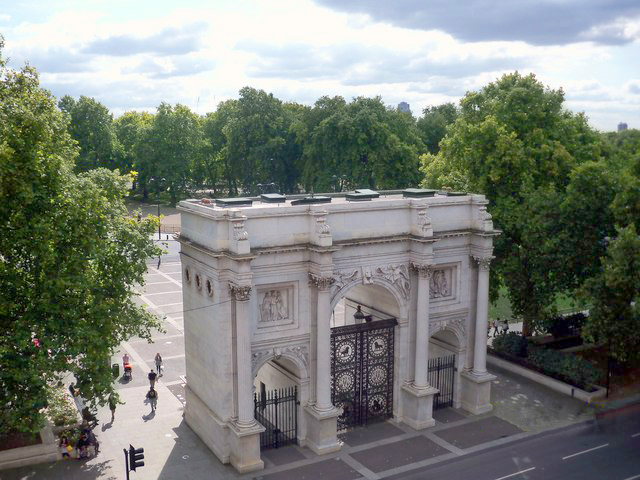
Aerial view of the arch and its surroundings, from the Cumberland Hotel, 2009

In late 1963 the police advised that vehicles emerging from Tyburn Way were causing congestion because of difficulties merging with eastbound traffic just as vehicles from Edgware Road were trying to get across to turn right into Park Lane. They asked for an experimental closure of Tyburn Way. This was granted, extended and then made permanent.

In 1966 London Transport introduced Red Arrow buses. These provided "express" services but with fewer seats and more standing. The flagship was the 500 service between Victoria and Marble Arch. To speed this service up, in August 1966 London Transport proposed opening Tyburn Way to the Red Arrow 500 service only: other London Transport buses would continue going all the way round. A traffic order was made, and Tyburn Way become one of the first bus-only roads in the UK. It was opened to all London Transport services in 1973 and remains bus-only today.

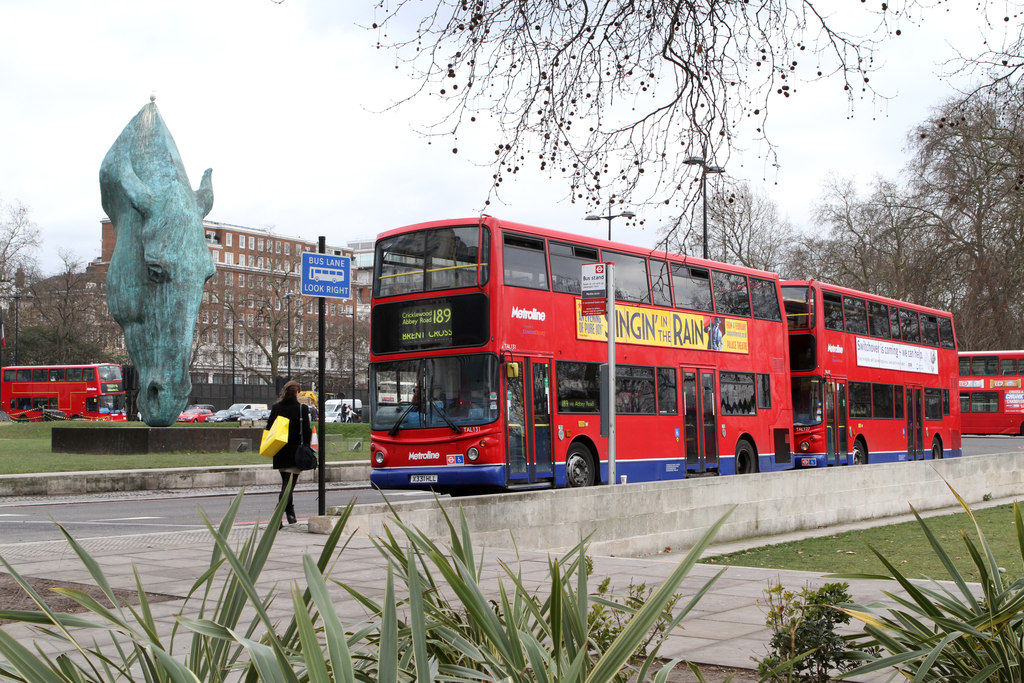
View south-east of Nic Fiddian-Green's Still Water sculpture and bus stand on Tyburn Way, 2012

In 2005 it was speculated that the arch might be moved across the street to Hyde Park. Any such move would need to take account of the large underground car park constructed in 1960–1964.

In 2011 Still Water, a large bronze sculpture of a horse's head by Nic Fiddian-Green, was unveiled on the east side of Tyburn Way, a short distance from the Arch.

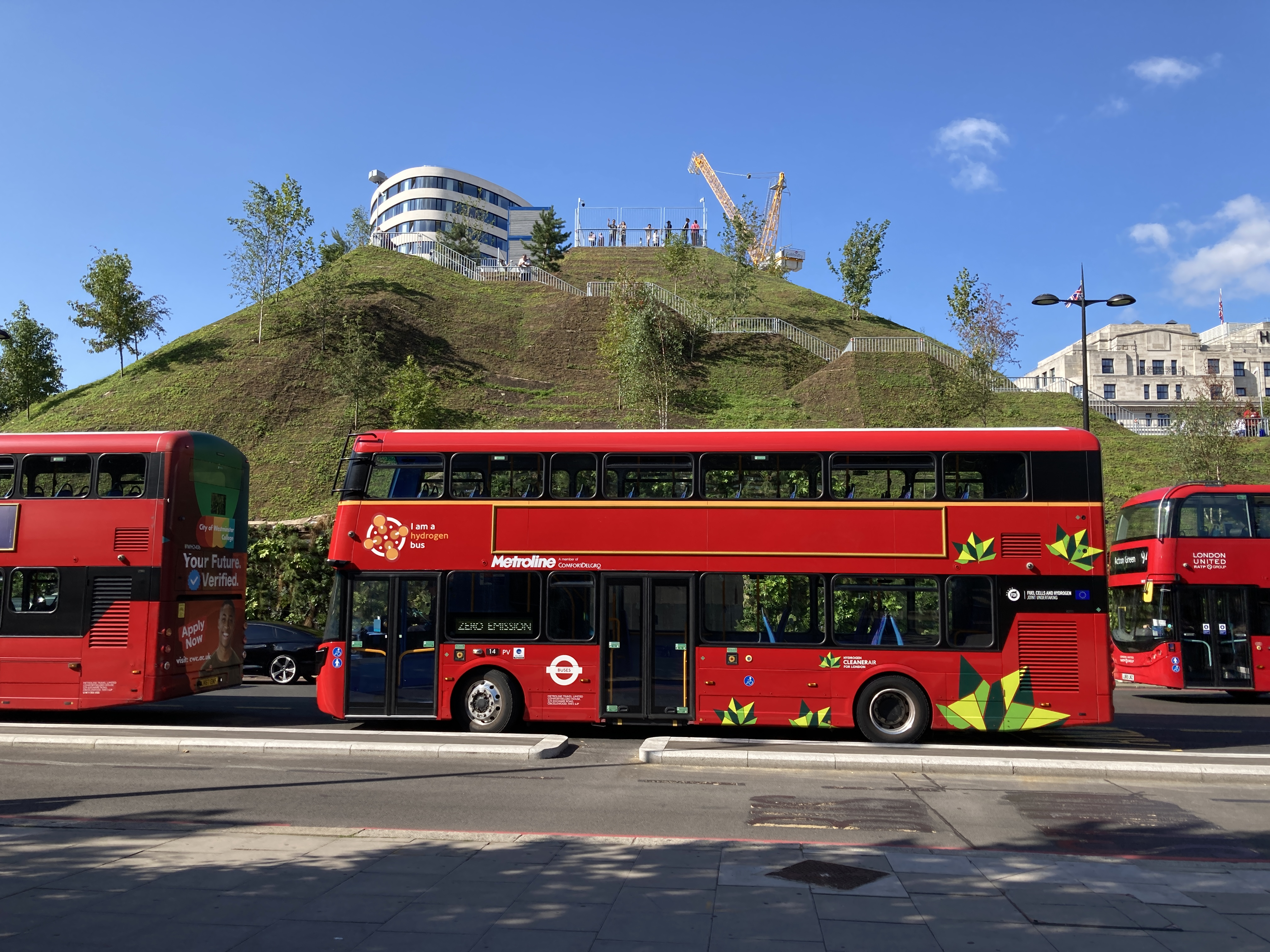
Buses at the base of the Marble Arch Mound, 2021

In 2021 the Marble Arch Mound, a temporary artificial hill next to the Arch was built as a tourist attraction. It was regarded with such derision that it had to be made free to attract visitors. It closed after less than six months and cost £6 million (including dismantling), having received 250,000 visitors.

== Marble Arch area ==
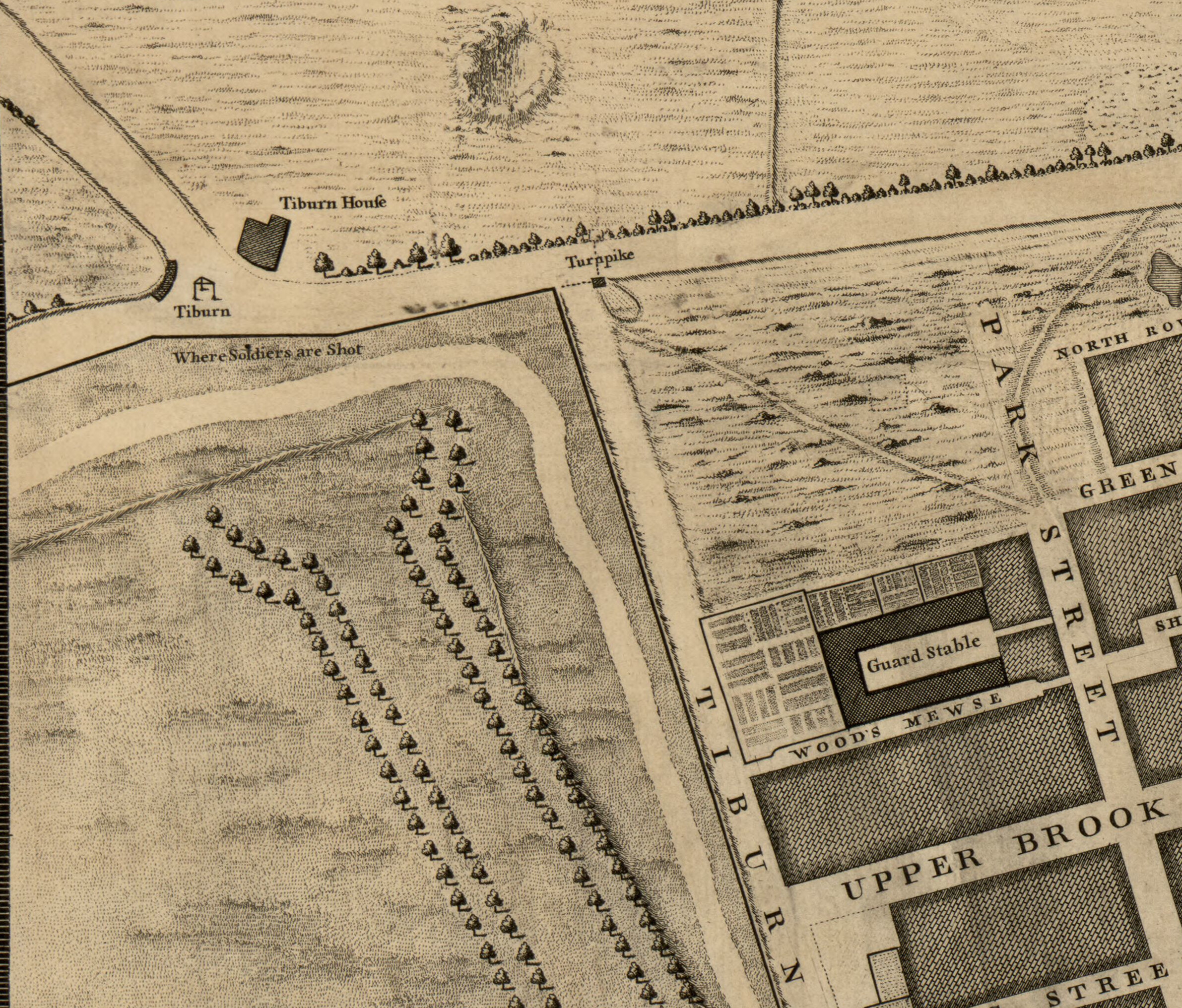
Tyburn from John Rocque's map of 1746. Oxford Street (east - west) was then called Tiburn Road and Park Lane was Tiburn Lane. The Tyburn was at the junction of Edgware Road and Tiburn Road.

In the eighteenth century, the junction of Park Lane with Oxford Street (then called Tiburn Road) marked one extremity of London. Outside it, at the junction with Edgware Road, lay the Tyburn gallows (sometimes called "Tyburn Tree"), a place of public execution from 1388 until 1793. "Tyburn" is the name of the stream which ran from Hampstead to the Thames at Westminster; the wiggly bit of Marylebone Lane followed its left bank.

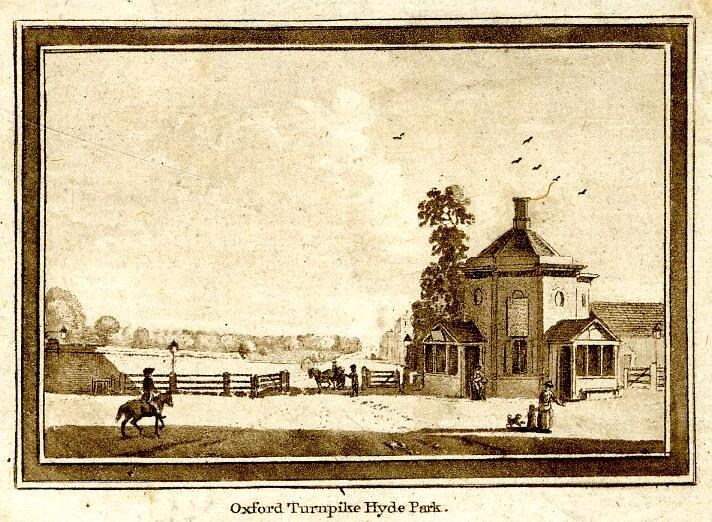
Toll house on the site of Tyburn gallows serving Bayswater and Edgware turnpikes, from Paul Sandby's Trade Card

By 1785 the gallows had been relocated 50 yards north along Edgware Road so that a toll house could be erected at the junction for gates across both Edgware Road and Bayswater Road. The artist Paul Sandby moved to North Row nearby and used a view of the turnpike on his trade card.

In 1900, the Central London Railway opened Marble Arch tube station across the road from the arch. The station is now on the Central line of the London Underground.

Having a tube station means that the arch gives rise to a colloquial, entirely modern London "area", with no parishes or established institutions bearing its name. This generally equates to parts in view of the arch of Mayfair, Marylebone and often all of St George's Fields, Marylebone (west of Edgware Road) all in the City of Westminster, London.

The area around the arch now forms a major road junction connecting Oxford Street to the east, Park Lane (A4202) to the south, Bayswater Road (A402) to the west, and Edgware Road (A5) to the north-west. The short road directly to the north of the arch is also known as Marble Arch.

The former cinema Odeon Marble Arch was located directly adjacent to the junction. Before 1997 this had the largest cinema screen in London. The screen was originally over 75 feet (23 m) wide. The Odeon showcased 70 mm films in a large circle-and-stalls auditorium. It closed in 2016 and was demolished later that same year.

== Image gallery ==
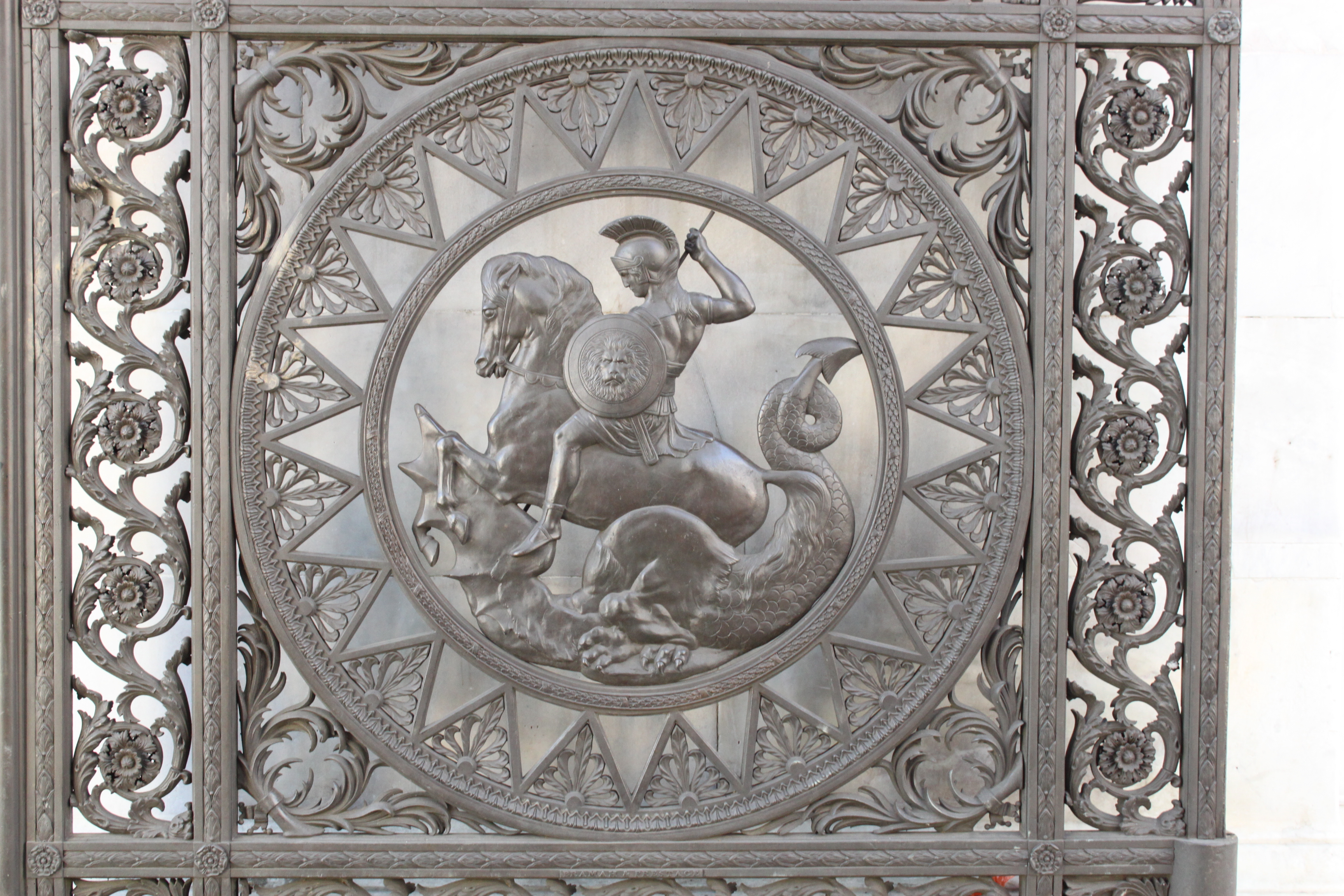
Detail from one of the gates

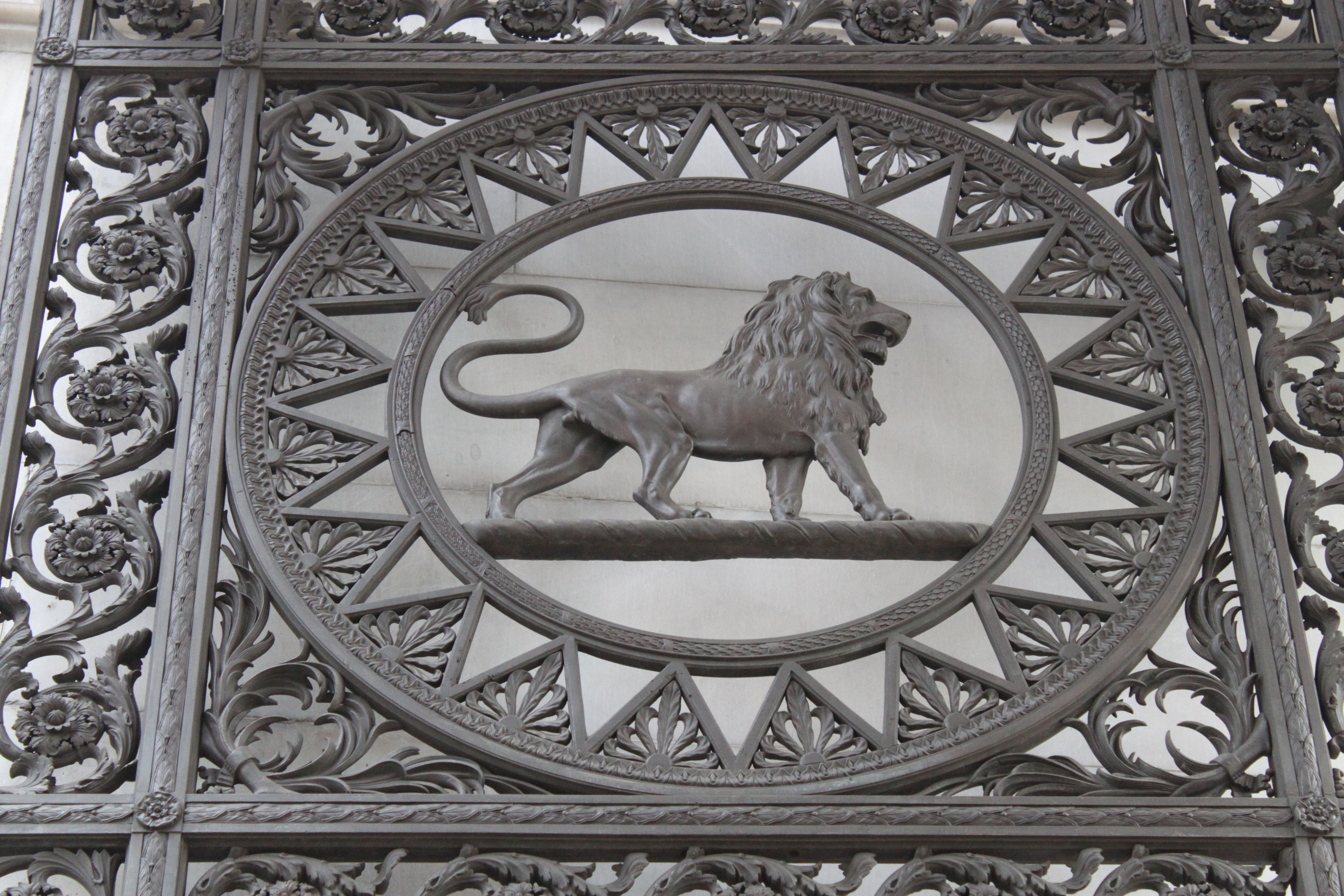
Detail from one of the gates

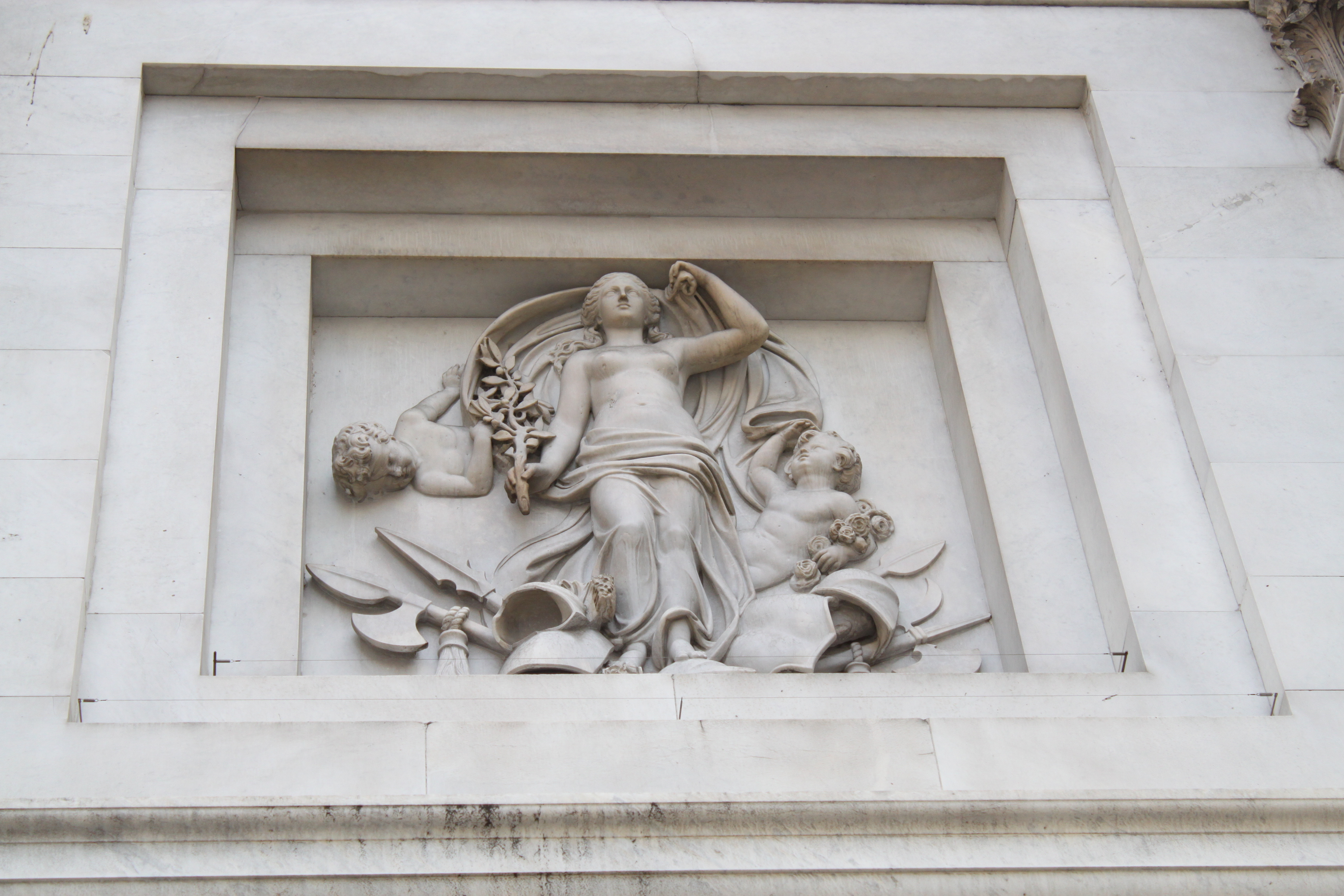
A carving on Marble Arch

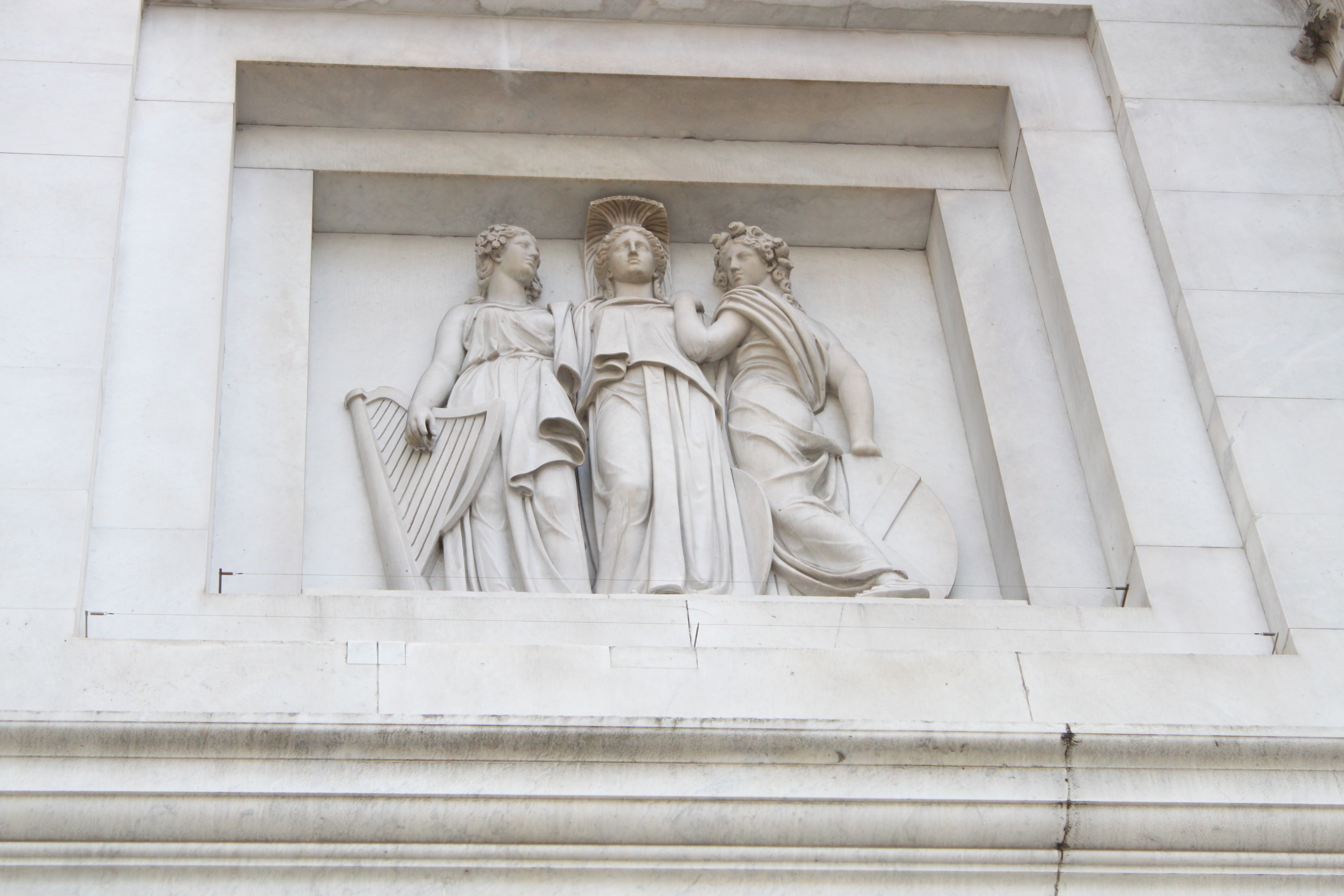
A carving on Marble Arch

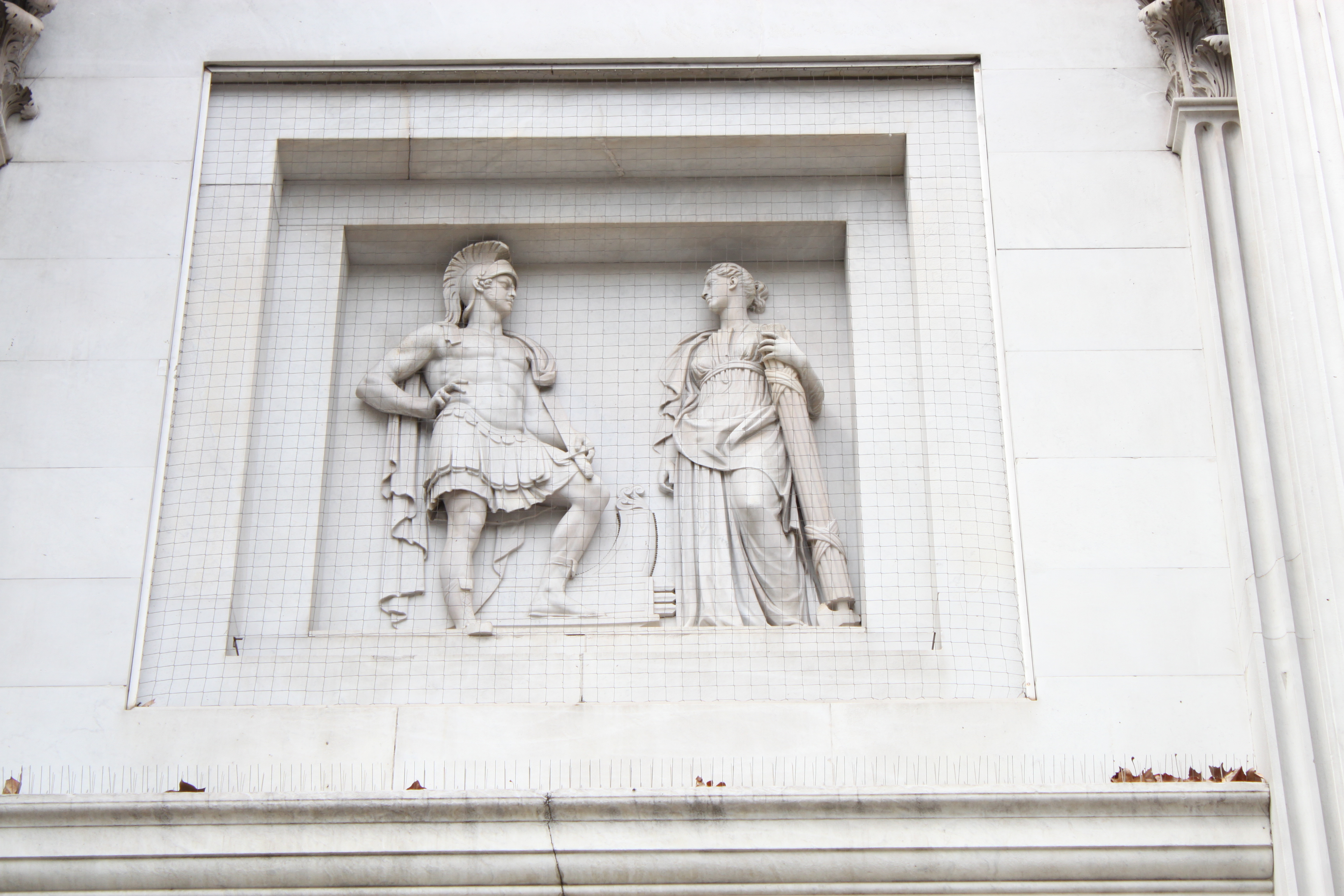
A carving on Marble Arch

=== Sculptures intended for the arch used elsewhere ===
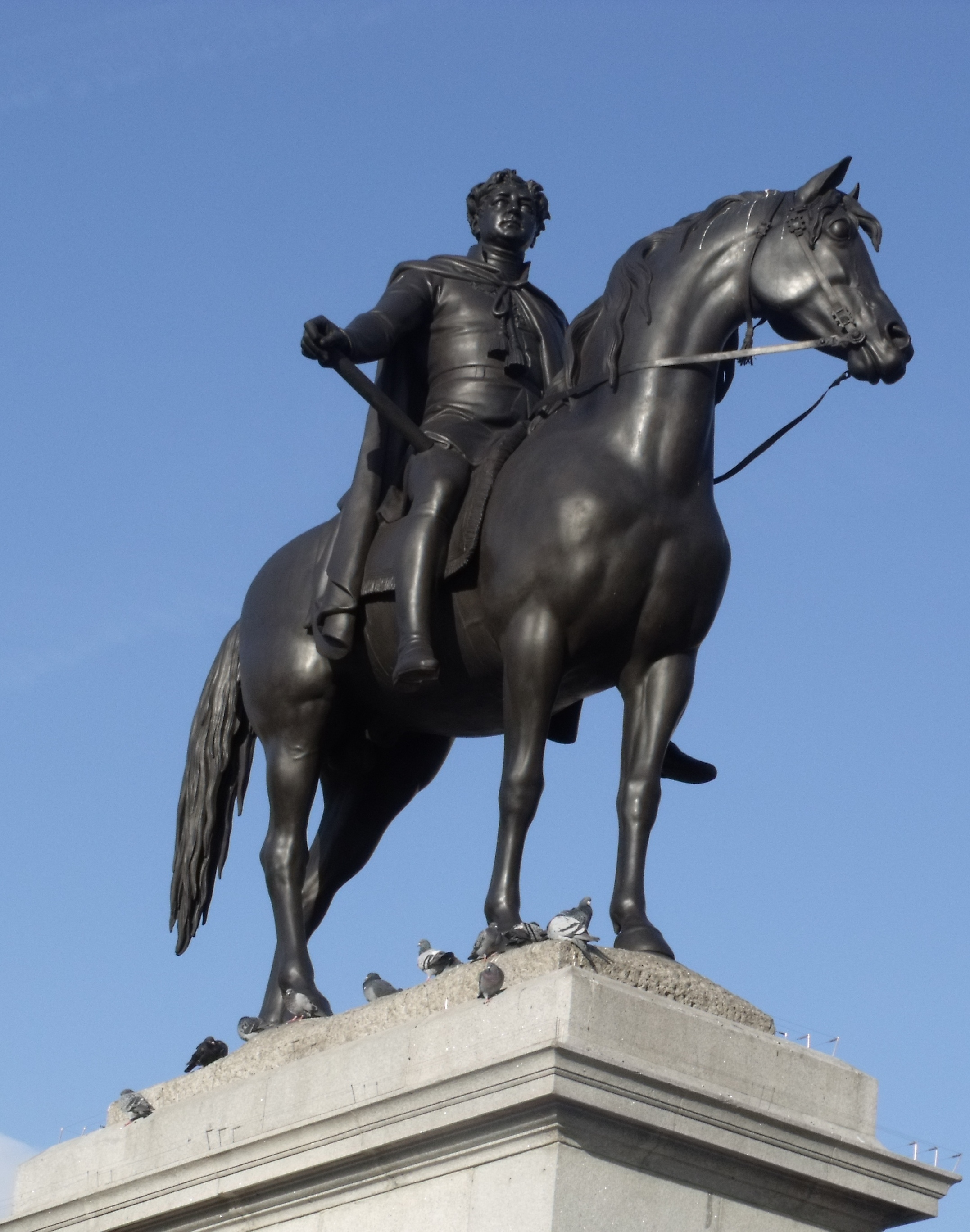
Equestrian statue of George IV

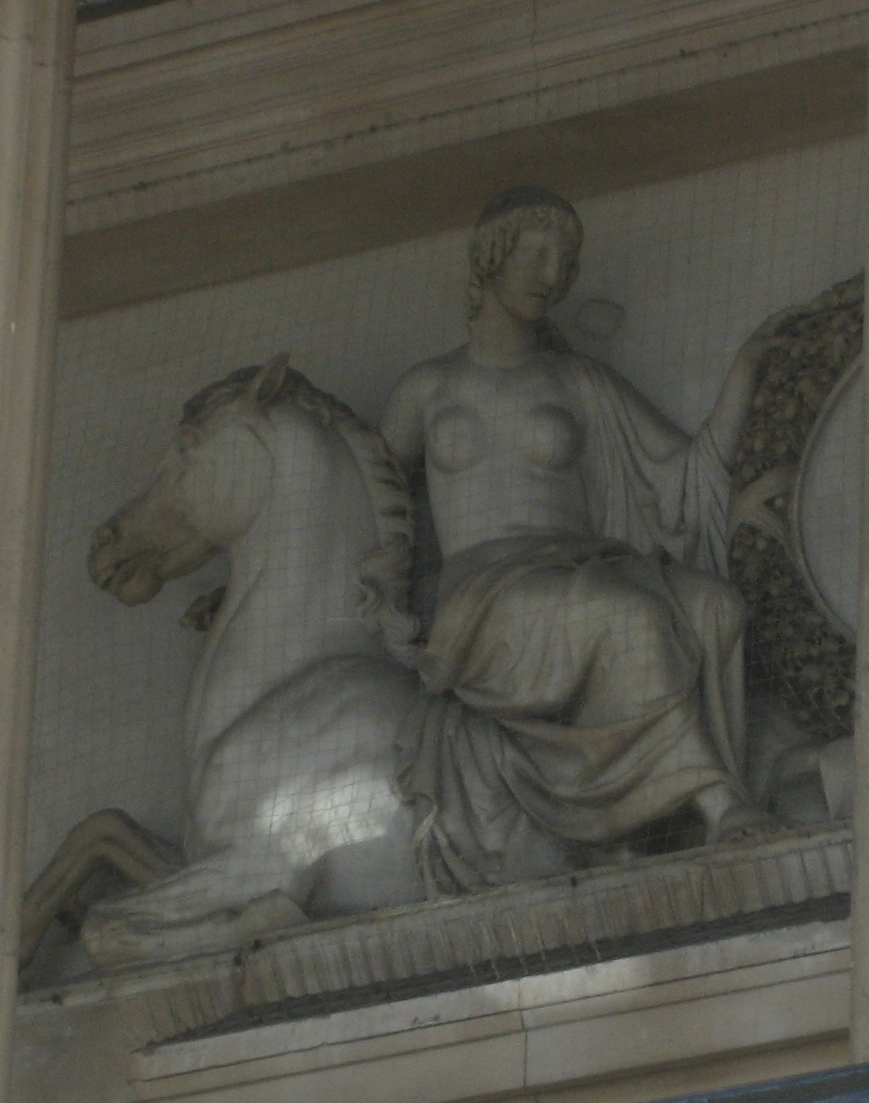
Europe

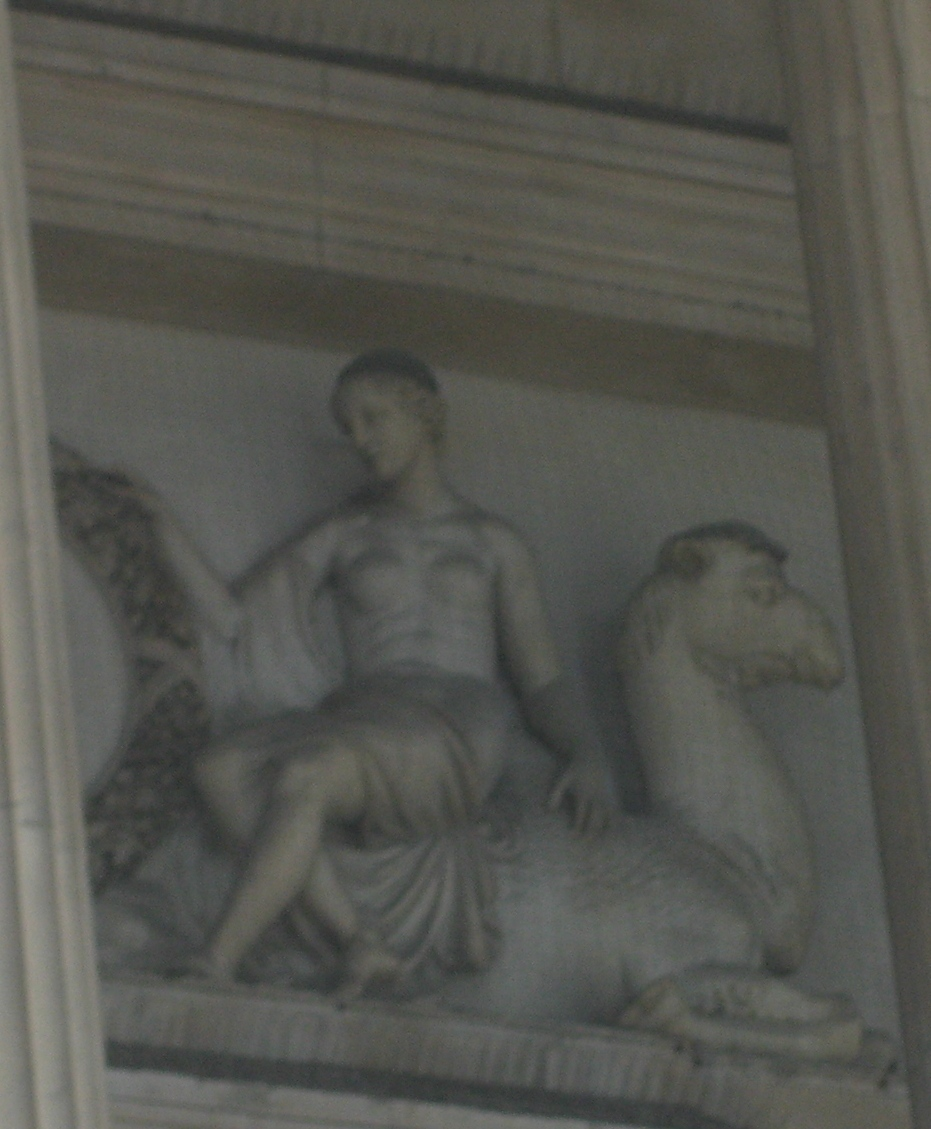
Asia/India

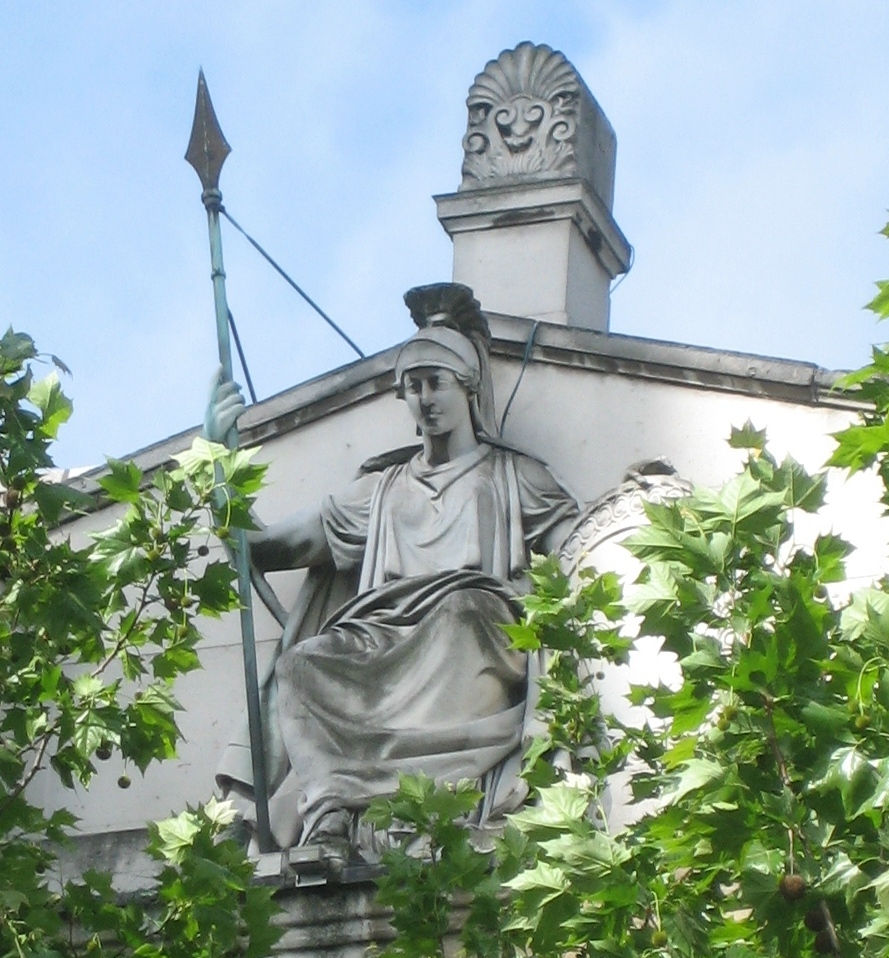
Britannia, now Minerva, patroness of the arts
