= The Sladmore Gallery =

Art dealership in London, England

Coordinates: 51°30′27.5436″N 0°8′21.3612″W

The Sladmore Gallery is a London art dealership at 57 Jermyn Street which opened in 2007. It was founded in 1965 by Jane Horswell at Sladmore Farm in Buckinghamshire. It held premises' at 32 Bruton Place from 1968 until 2024. Whilst it specialises in animalier sculptors (with a particular focus on 19th and 20th century bronzes), the gallery has also had a strong focus on contemporary sculpture since the 1990s.

Its Directors are Edward Horswell and Nona Horswell.

The Gallery has posthumously held exhibitions for Auguste Rodin, Aristide Maillol, Edgar Degas, Rembrandt Bugatti, Prince Paul Troubetzkoy and Antoine-Louis Barye. Living exhibitors at the London premises have included Mark Coreth, Geoffrey Dashwood , Sophie Dickens and Nic Fiddian-Green .

The Sladmore Gallery also puts on shows and fairs in New York, Maastricht, Paris and London.

The Sladmore Gallery is a member of the British Antique Dealers' Association and the Society of London Art Dealers.
