= Still Water (sculpture) =

Public sculpture in London

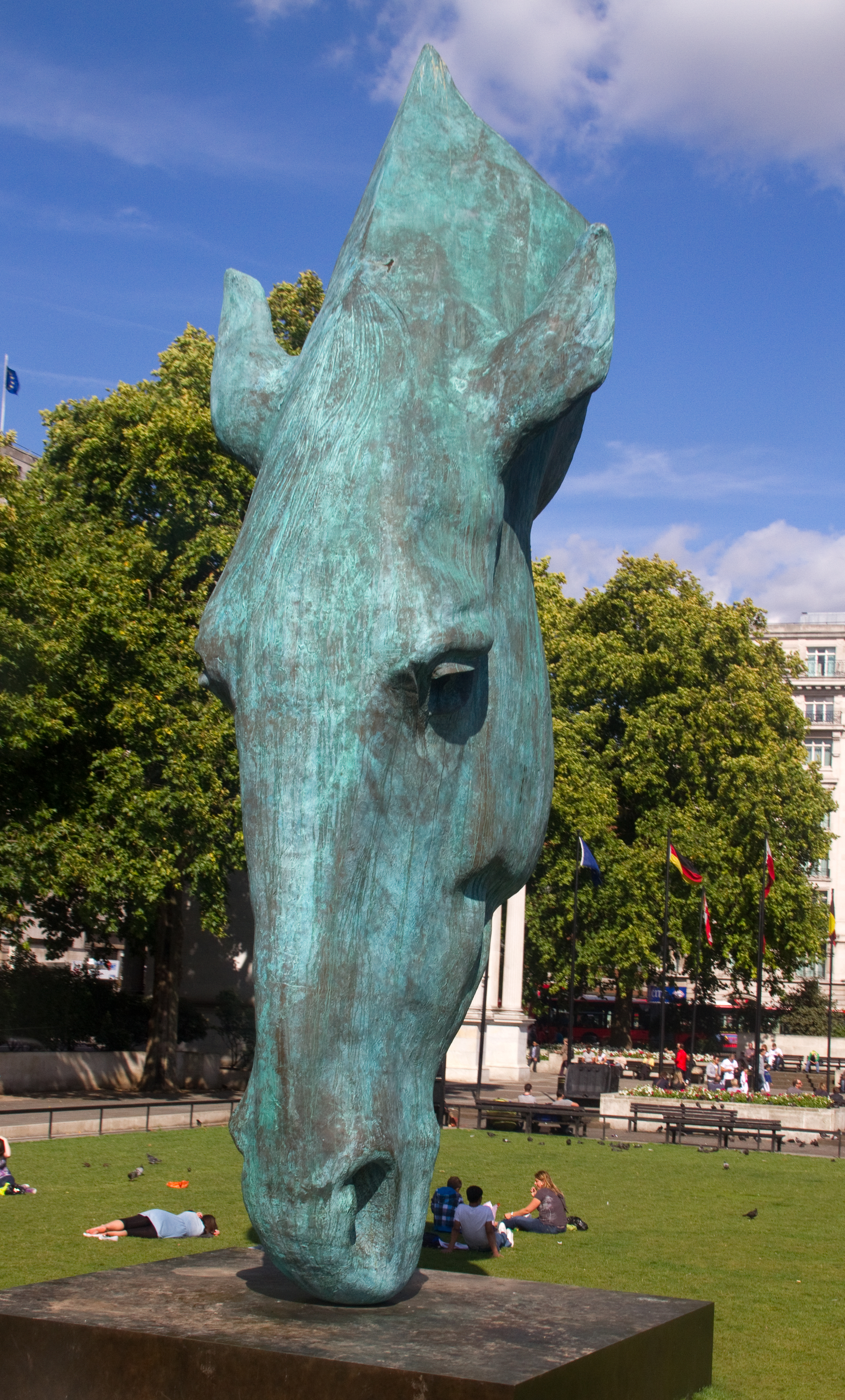
- The sculpture at Marble Arch in 2011
- Artist: Nic Fiddian-Green
- Year: 2011
- Type: Sculpture
- Medium: Bronze
- Subject: Horse
- Dimensions: 10 m (33 ft)
- Location: Achilles Way, London, England; 51°30′16″N 0°09′05″W

Still Water is a large public sculpture in bronze of a horse's head by Nic Fiddian-Green, dating to 2011. It is located at Achilles Way, near Hyde Park Corner in central London, and was initially installed at Marble Arch. The work remains owned by the artist, and is on loan to Westminster City Council.

The 33 feet (10 m) piece was commissioned to replace an earlier and similar, but slightly smaller, work, Horse at Water XV, which was temporarily installed on the site in 2001. That earlier work was moved to Daylesford, Gloucestershire, the home of Sir Anthony and Lady Carole Bamford, who had commissioned it.

In 2012, Fiddian-Green cleaned the sculpture himself, using a cherry picker.

In May 2021 the work was moved to its current location on Achilles Way.

== Similar sculptures ==
In 2020, Syria installed a similar sculpture in Rawda Square, Damascus.

A small copy of the sculpture stands in the centre of the village of At-Bashy in Kyrgyzstan as the village's name is literally translated as "horse's head" in one of the versions. Another stands in the museum of the National Sporting Library and Museum in Middleburg, Virginia.

There is also a copy outside One Island East which houses the headquarters of Swire Properties in Hong Kong.

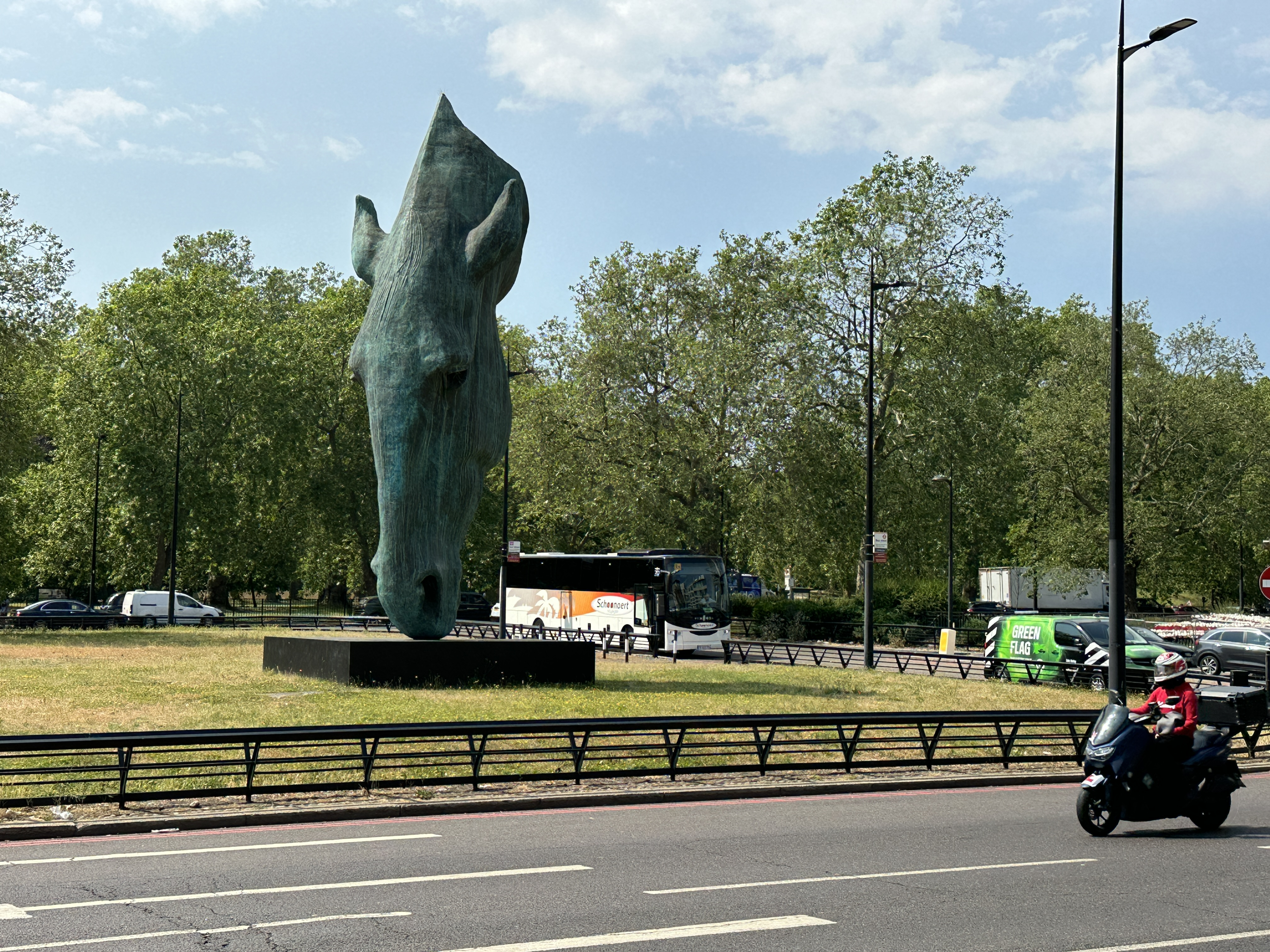
The sculpture at Achilles Way in 2023
