= Nic Fiddian-Green =

British sculptor

- Born: 1963 (age 62–63); Ireland
- Occupation: Sculptor

Nic Fiddian-Green (born 1963) is a British sculptor, who specialises is making lifelike models of horses' heads, both smaller and larger than life-sized.

== Early life ==
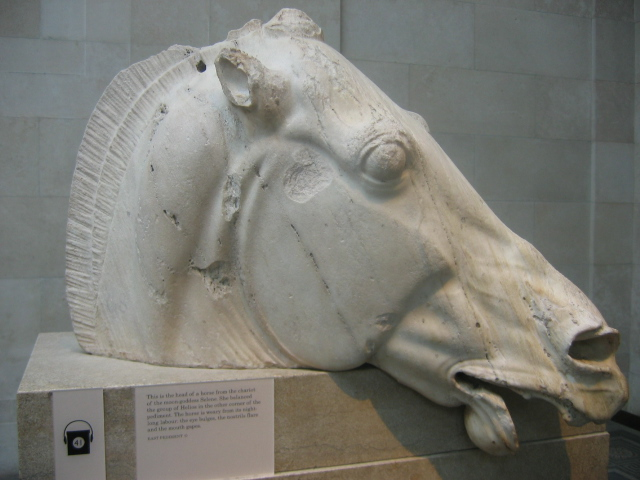
Head of the horse of Selene, which inspired Fiddian-Green, with the Elgin Marbles in the British Museum

Born in Ireland, Fiddian-Green was educated at Eton College. Later, as a foundation-course student at Chelsea College of Arts he was sent on a visit to the British Museum to seek inspiration, and chanced upon a carving of horse's head, the horse of Selene, in the Elgin Marbles room there. He described it as "one of the most beautiful objects I'd ever seen". Shortly afterwards, he began to make works of similar subjects.

== Career ==
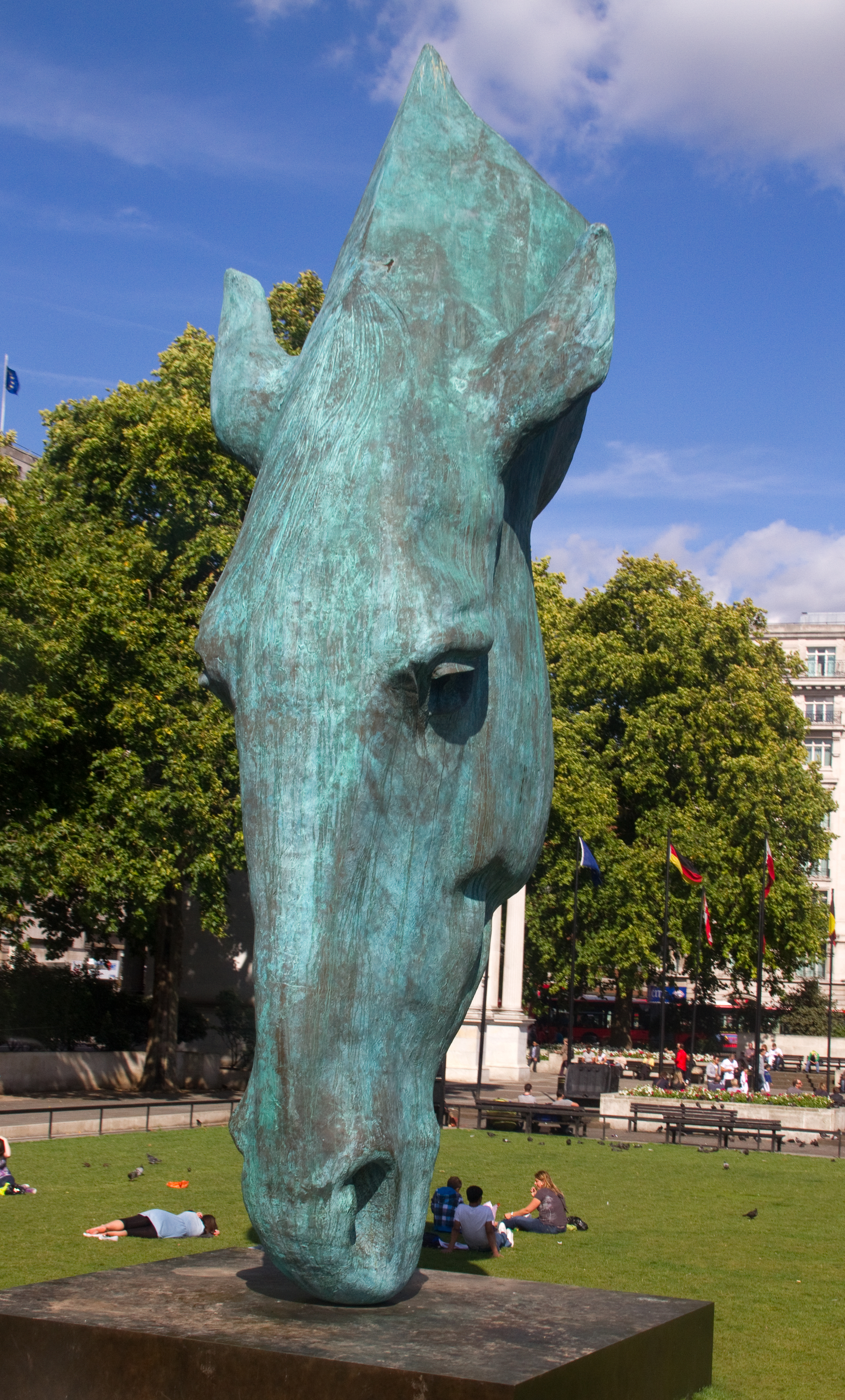
Still Water

One of Fiddian-Green’s larger works, Horse at Water was installed temporarily at Marble Arch in London. Once it was moved to Daylesford, Gloucestershire, the home of Lord and Lady Bamford, who had commissioned it, he was asked to make a larger version, Still Water (2011; 33 feet (10 m) tall), to replace it.

His first protest artwork, Serenity, is installed on a hill by the A3 at Claygate, Surrey. Made of lead, it is intended to be a "monument of calm" for drivers.

Fiddian-Green works from a studio in the stable block at Wintershall, Surrey, using the horses there as life models. He casts bronze outdoors, using a mobile kiln, in the woods there. He also works in clay and riveted sheet metal, soapstone, and Carrara and Connemara marble.

He has exhibited at The Sladmore Gallery, who represent him, in London, and has works installed at Royal Ascot, Goodwood, Knowsley Hall, Glyndebourne, Wellington College (Copenhagen, the Duke of Wellington's horse, 2012), and at the Dowager Duchess of Devonshire's private stables; plus three at Nevill Holt, at the home of Carphone Warehouse founder David Ross

He also models non-equine subjects, for example Christ Rests in Peace is a representation of the head of Jesus wearing a crown of thorns, in lead and gold leaf, measuring 4-by-8-foot (1.2 m × 2.4 m) is at Southwark Cathedral.

Besides the UK, his works are in Russia, Kazakhstan, America, the Middle East, and Australia.

== Personal life ==
In 2006, Fiddian-Green underwent six months of chemotherapy to treat leukaemia.

His partner Henrietta is a horsewoman. They live in an 18th-century cottage on the Surrey Downs, with an adjacent cowshed, formerly his studio, converted as an extension. They have four children and six horses.

== Bibliography ==
- Nic Fiddian-Green – Recent Sculpture, Nic Fiddian-Green, Gerry Farrell (1999)
- Nic Fiddian Green, 2010 Nic Fiddian-Green (Author), Harry Cory Wright (Photographer), ISBN 978-0956756800
