= Little Venice (ward) =

Electoral ward of the City of Westminster, London

- Electoral ward for the Westminster City Council
- Borough: Westminster
- County: Greater London

Current electoral ward
- Created: 1978
- GSS code: E05013799 (2022–present)

Little Venice is an electoral ward of the City of Westminster. The population at the 2021 Census was 10,366. The ward covers the area south of Maida Vale and north of Paddington, bound by the Westway, Edgware Road and Grand Union Canal. The Regent's Canal runs through the ward to Little Venice basin, and it is served by Warwick Avenue station on the Bakerloo line, in addition to several bus routes running through the area. There are three primary schools, St Joseph's RC Primary School, St Saviour's C of E Primary School, and Ark Paddington Green Primary Academy, and one GP surgery in the ward.

The locality known as Little Venice was largely represented by the original Maida Vale ward, created in 1964, which elected five councillors. For the May 1978 election, the ward was split into two: Maida Vale and Little Venice, each electing three councillors. There were minor boundary changes in 2002 and 2022.

The ward currently returns three councillors to Westminster City Council, with an election every four years. At the last election in May 2022, two candidates from the Conservative Party and one from the Labour Party were elected to represent the ward. Since 2024, the ward has formed part of the Queen's Park and Maida Vale parliamentary constituency, having previously been in the abolished Westminster North seat. The Member of Parliament representing the ward is Georgia Gould (Labour).

== Councillors ==
Three councillors represent Little Venice ward. Notable councillors have included Melvyn Caplan, leader of Westminster City Council (1995 to 2000) and deputy leader (until 2021), Jonathan Lord, former MP for Woking and deputy leader of Westminster Council (1998 to 2000), Nick St Aubyn, former MP for Guildford (1997 to 2001), and Anne Weyman, vice-chair of Britain for Europe.

Election	Councillor	Councillor	Councillor
2022	Lorraine Dean (Con)	Melvyn Caplan (Con)	Sara Hassan (Lab)
2018	Lorraine Dean (Con)	Melvyn Caplan (Con)	Matthew Charles Green (Con)
2014	Ian Adams (Con)	Melvyn Caplan (Con)	Barbara Jolanda Arzymanow (Con)
2010	Ian Adams (Con)	Melvyn Caplan (Con)	Margaret Doyle (Con)
2006	Ian Adams (Con)	Melvyn Caplan (Con)	Margaret Doyle (Con)
2002	Ian Adams (Con)	Melvyn Caplan (Con)	Barbara Schmeling (Con)
1998	Jonathan Lord (Con)	Melvyn Caplan (Con)	Barbara Schmeling (Con)
1994	Jonathan Lord (Con)	Melvyn Caplan (Con)	Julia Hunt (Con)
1990	Anthony Alford (Con)	Melvyn Caplan (Con)	Julia Hunt (Con)
1986	Isla Robertson (Lab)	Helen Goldfarb (Lab)	David Obaze (Lab)
1982	Robin Walker (Con)	Nick St Aubyn (Con)	Ian Walker (Con)
1978	Stephen Molyneux (Lab)	Anne Weyman (Lab)	Christopher Bulford (Lab)

== Election results ==
Like the other wards of Westminster, Little Venice is represented by three councillors on Westminster City Council. The last election was held on 5 May 2022, when all three councillors were elected. Two councillors represent the Conservative Party and one represents the Labour Party. Candidates seeking re-election are marked with an asterisk (*).

=== 2022 election ===
Little Venice ward election, 5 May 2022
Party	Candidate	Votes	%	±%
Conservative	Lorraine Dean*	1,140		
Conservative	Melvyn Bernard Caplan*	1,136		
Labour	Sara Hassan	1,104		
Conservative	Matthew Charles Green*	1,088		
Labour	Rosie Wrighting	1,071		
Labour	Murad Qureshi	1,053		
Liberal Democrats	Marianne Magnin	231		
Liberal Democrats	Timothy Nigel Stokes	196		
Liberal Democrats	Bahram Alimoradian	161		
Majority				
Turnout		2480	37.6	
Conservative hold		Swing		
Conservative hold		Swing		
Labour gain from Conservative		Swing		

=== 2018 election ===
Little Venice ward, 3 May 2018
Party	Candidate	Votes	%	±%
Conservative	Melvyn Bernard Caplan*	1,479	50.4	
Conservative	Lorraine Dean	1,422		
Conservative	Matthew Charles Green	1,354		
Labour	Sue Wolff	1,177	40.1	
Labour	Iman Less	1,148		
Labour	Murad Qureshi	1,127		
Liberal Democrats	Marianne Veronique Magnin	307	10.5	
Liberal Democrats	Benjamin John Hurdis	275		
Liberal Democrats	Roberto Jose Ekholm	264		
Majority				
Turnout		8553	44.3	
Conservative hold		Swing		
Conservative hold		Swing		
Conservative hold		Swing		

=== 2014 election ===
Little Venice ward, 22 May 2014
Party	Candidate	Votes	%	±%
Conservative	Melvyn Bernard Caplan*	1,102	51.4	
Conservative	Ian Adams*	1,076		
Conservative	Barbara Jolanda Arzymanow	1,075		
Labour	Sue Wolff	695	32.4	
Labour	Betty Moini	680		
Labour	Aicha Less	664		
Green	Lynnet Jane Pready	346	16.2	
Liberal Democrats	Bahram Alimoradian	169	7.9	
Liberal Democrats	Roberto Ekholm	157		
Majority				
Turnout		5964	32.5	−25.1
Conservative hold		Swing		
Conservative hold		Swing		
Conservative hold		Swing		

=== 2010 election ===
Little Venice ward, 6 May 2010
Party	Candidate	Votes	%	±%
Conservative	Melvyn B. Caplan*	1,966	44.9	
Conservative	Margaret M. Doyle*	1,920		
Conservative	Ian Adams*	1,884		
Labour	Mark Davies	1291	29.5	
Labour	Aicha Less	680		
Labour	Romena Toki	907		
Liberal Democrats	Philip J. Wardle	676	15.5	
Liberal Democrats	Bahram Alimoradian	658		
Liberal Democrats	Roberto Ekholm	592		
Green	Lynnet J. Pready	442	10.1	
Majority				
Turnout			57.6	
Conservative hold		Swing		
Conservative hold		Swing		
Conservative hold		Swing		

=== 2006 election ===
Little Venice ward, 4 May 2006
Party	Candidate	Votes	%	±%
Conservative	Melvyn B. Caplan*	1,266	63.8	
Conservative	Margaret M. Doyle	1,248		
Conservative	Ian Adams*	1,246		
Labour	David E.R. Obaze	405	20.4	
Labour	John A. Edwardes	402		
Labour	Andrew Blick	399		
Liberal Democrats	Jonathan J. Wardle	312	15.7	
Liberal Democrats	Jeremy K. Swan	218		
Liberal Democrats	Philip J. Wardle	271		
Majority				
Turnout			29.1	
Conservative hold		Swing		
Conservative hold		Swing		
Conservative hold		Swing		

=== 2002 election ===
Little Venice ward, 2 May 2002
Party	Candidate	Votes	%	±%
Conservative	Melvyn B. Caplan*	1,177	65.1	
Conservative	Ian Adams	1,159		
Conservative	Barbara J. Schmeling*	1,147		
Labour	Paul A. O'Donnell	395	21.8	
Labour	Beryl J. Leaver	377		
Labour	Basma M.A. Elsafi	374		
Liberal Democrats	Michael Ryan	236	13.1	
Liberal Democrats	Michael Dearden	214		
Liberal Democrats	Philip J. Wardle	199		
Majority				
Turnout			27.7	
Conservative hold		Swing		
Conservative hold		Swing		
Conservative hold		Swing		

=== 1998 election ===
Little Venice ward, 7 May 1998
Party	Candidate	Votes	%	±%
Conservative	Melvyn B. Caplan*	1,352	60.4	
Conservative	Barbara J. Schmeling	1,318		
Conservative	Jonathan Lord*	1,317		
Labour	Joseph Hegarty	689	30.8	
Labour	Guthrie K. McKie	655		
Labour	David E.R. Obaze	642		
Liberal Democrats	Ruth D. Simms	199	8.9	
Liberal Democrats	David R. Brewin	166		
Liberal Democrats	Philip J. Wardle	164		
Majority				
Turnout			37.6	
Conservative hold		Swing		
Conservative hold		Swing		
Conservative hold		Swing		

=== 1994 election ===
Little Venice ward, 5 May 1994
Party	Candidate	Votes	%	±%
Conservative	Julia K. Hunt*	1,461	53.3	
Conservative	Melvyn B. Caplan*	1,453		
Conservative	Jonathan Lord	1,405		
Labour	Margaret E. Cahill	1064	38.8	
Labour	David E.R. Obaze	1023		
Labour	Francis M. Prideaux	995		
Liberal Democrats	Martin J. Sale	215	7.8	
Liberal Democrats	David R. Brewin	201		
Liberal Democrats	Philip J. Wardle	196		
Majority				
Turnout			52.5	
Conservative hold		Swing		
Conservative hold		Swing		
Conservative hold		Swing		

=== 1990 election ===
Little Venice ward, 3 May 1990
Party	Candidate	Votes	%	±%
Conservative	Melvyn B. Caplan	1,704	53.7	
Conservative	Julia K. Hunt	1,680		
Conservative	Anthony P.R. Alford	1,680		
Labour	Isla Robertson*	1285	40.5	
Labour	Linda C. Hardman	1274		
Labour	David E.R. Obaze*	1255		
Liberal Democrats	Paul E.M. Reynolds	182	5.7	
Majority				
Turnout			59.5	
Conservative gain from Labour		Swing		
Conservative gain from Labour		Swing		
Conservative gain from Labour		Swing		

=== 1986 election ===
Little Venice ward, 8 May 1986
Party	Candidate	Votes	%	±%
Labour	Isla B. Robertson	1,041	32.1	
Labour	Helen A. Goldfarb	976		
Labour	David E.R. Obaze	975		
Conservative	Nicholas F. St Aubyn*	939	29.0	
Conservative	Simon J. Morris	906		
Conservative	Iain B. Walker*	898		
Alliance	Michael G.M. Cousins	634	19.3	
Alliance	Brian D. Cuthbertson	627	19.3	
Alliance	Joe Aveline	582		
Majority				
Turnout			46.0	
Labour gain from Conservative		Swing		
Labour gain from Conservative		Swing		
Labour gain from Conservative		Swing		

=== 1982 election ===
Little Venice ward, 6 May 1982
Party	Candidate	Votes	%	±%
Conservative	Robin C.A. Walker	1,180	36.7	
Conservative	Nicholas F. St Aubyn	1,171		
Conservative	Ian B. Walker	1,163		
Labour	Phil Molyneux	983	30.6	
Labour	Andrew C. Gregg	977		
Labour	Gavin J. Millar	956		
Alliance	Mark A.O. Davis	552	17.2	
Alliance	Gabriel Bowman	521		
Alliance	Wilfrid Pickard	499	15.5	
Majority				
Turnout			41.4	
Conservative gain from Labour		Swing		
Conservative gain from Labour		Swing		
Conservative gain from Labour		Swing		

=== 1978 election ===
Little Venice ward, 4 May 1978
Party	Candidate	Votes	%	±%
Labour	Stephen P. Molyneux	1,344	45.8	
Labour	Anne J. Weyman	1,321		
Labour	Christopher L. Bulford	1,276		
Conservative	Rachel T.A. Gardner	1218	41.5	
Conservative	Simon J. Mabey	1214		
Conservative	Anne M. Jobson	1210		
Liberal	Thomas A. Kingston	278	9.5	
Save London Alliance	Carol R. Dorrington-Ward	92	3.1	
Save London Alliance	Kathleen M. Porritt	61		
Save London Alliance	Vincent Saunders	40		
Majority				
Turnout			40.8	
Labour win (new seat)				
Labour win (new seat)				
Labour win (new seat)				

== See also ==
- Maida Vale ward
