= Marble Arch Mound =

Artificial hill in London, England

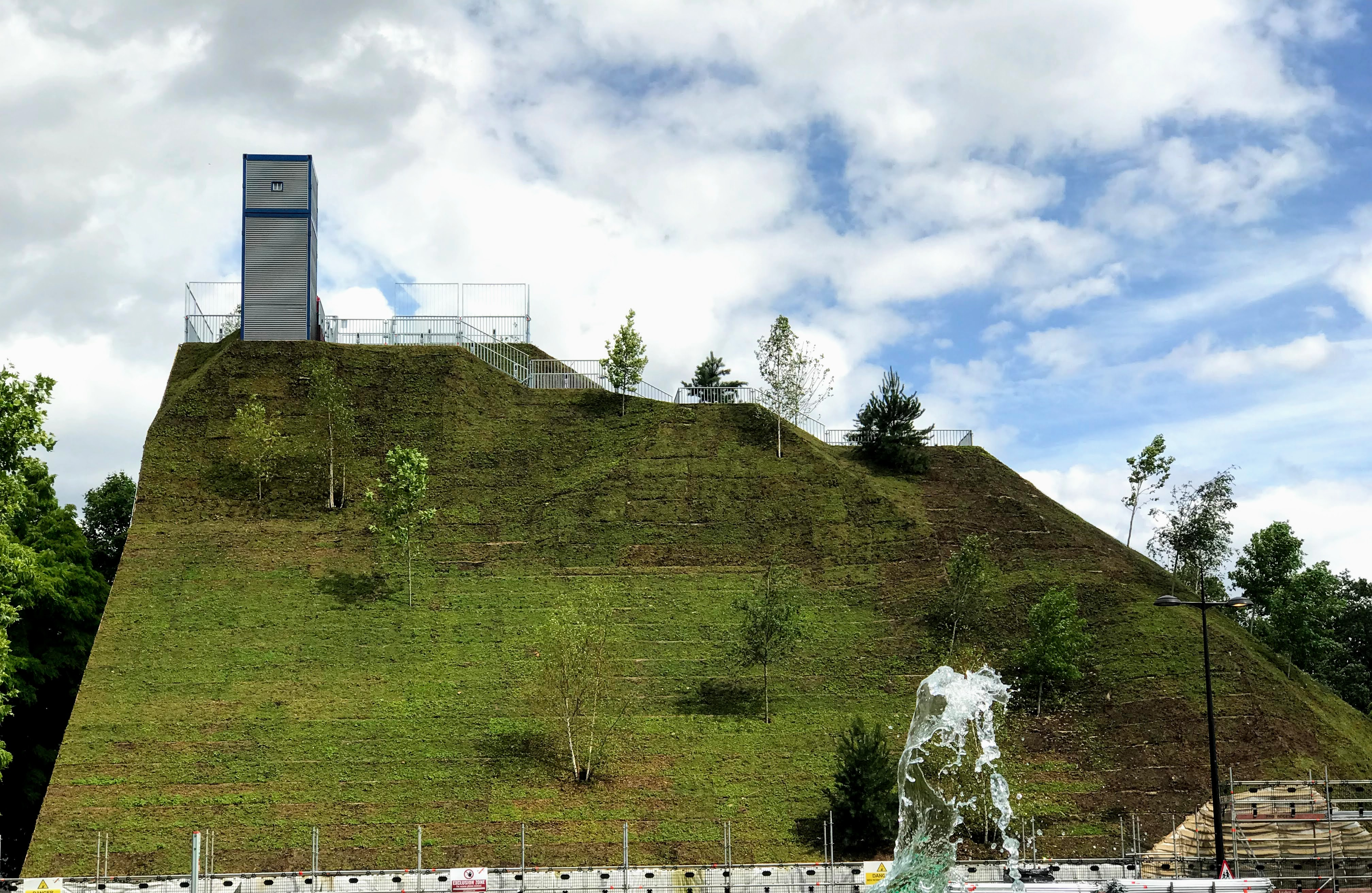
- The western aspect. The rectangular structure at the top is a lift.

General information
- Type: Artificial hill
- Location: Marble Arch, London, United Kingdom
- Coordinates: 51°30′46″N 0°09′34″W
- Opened: 26 July 2021
- Closed: 9 January 2022
- Cost: £6 million

Height
- Height: 25 metres (82 ft)

Technical details
- Material: Scaffolding, turf

Design and construction
- Architecture firm: MVRDV

Website
- Official website

The Marble Arch Mound or Marble Arch Hill was a temporary 25-metre-high (82 ft) artificial hill located next to Marble Arch in London. It had a viewing platform on the summit and an events space inside. The hill opened to the public on 26 July 2021, with an entrance fee, but shortly afterwards it was briefly closed after complaints from the first visitors. It re-opened in August with entry free of charge. It remained open to the public until 9 January 2022, and was subsequently dismantled.

== Description ==
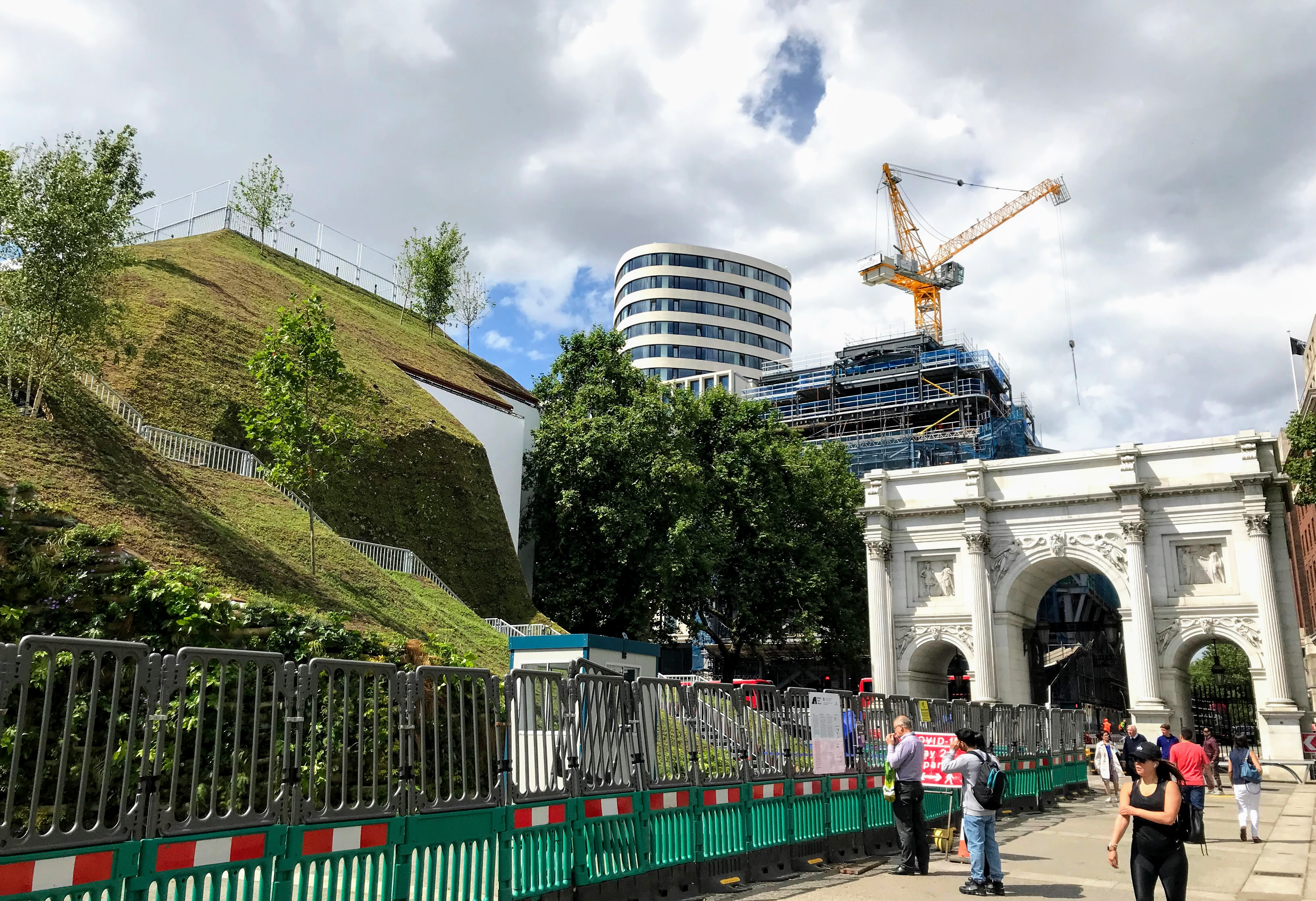
The Mound was situated next to Marble Arch

The hill was located in the north-east corner of Hyde Park, close to Marble Arch, at the western end of Oxford Street. The 25-metre (82 ft) high hill was built from scaffolding covered with sedum turf and a number of trees, with 130 steps up (or a lift) to a viewing platform at the top and an events space inside. Visitors could only walk on specified walkways and metal steps, and it had a capacity of 1,000 visitors per day, with a limit of 25 at a time. At the time of the planning application, a total of 200,000 visitors were expected. It also had a shop and cafe, with an exhibition titled "Lightfield" by W1 Curates and Anthony James.

The project was commissioned by Westminster City Council, hoping to boost domestic tourism; to help speed up the return of shoppers to Oxford Street after the COVID-19 pandemic lockdown ended; and to offer views across central London, including Battersea Power Station and Canary Wharf.

The Mound was covered with living plants, with a variable level of success.

The mound was designed by the Rotterdam-based architectural firm MVRDV. MVRDV's original plan was to cover the Marble Arch itself, but this was rejected by conservation experts who were concerned that six months of darkness might weaken the mortar joints and so a corner was removed from the hill to avoid covering the monument. Shrinking the hill also required a change from covering the hill with soil, to using the lighter sedum turf.

== Cost ==
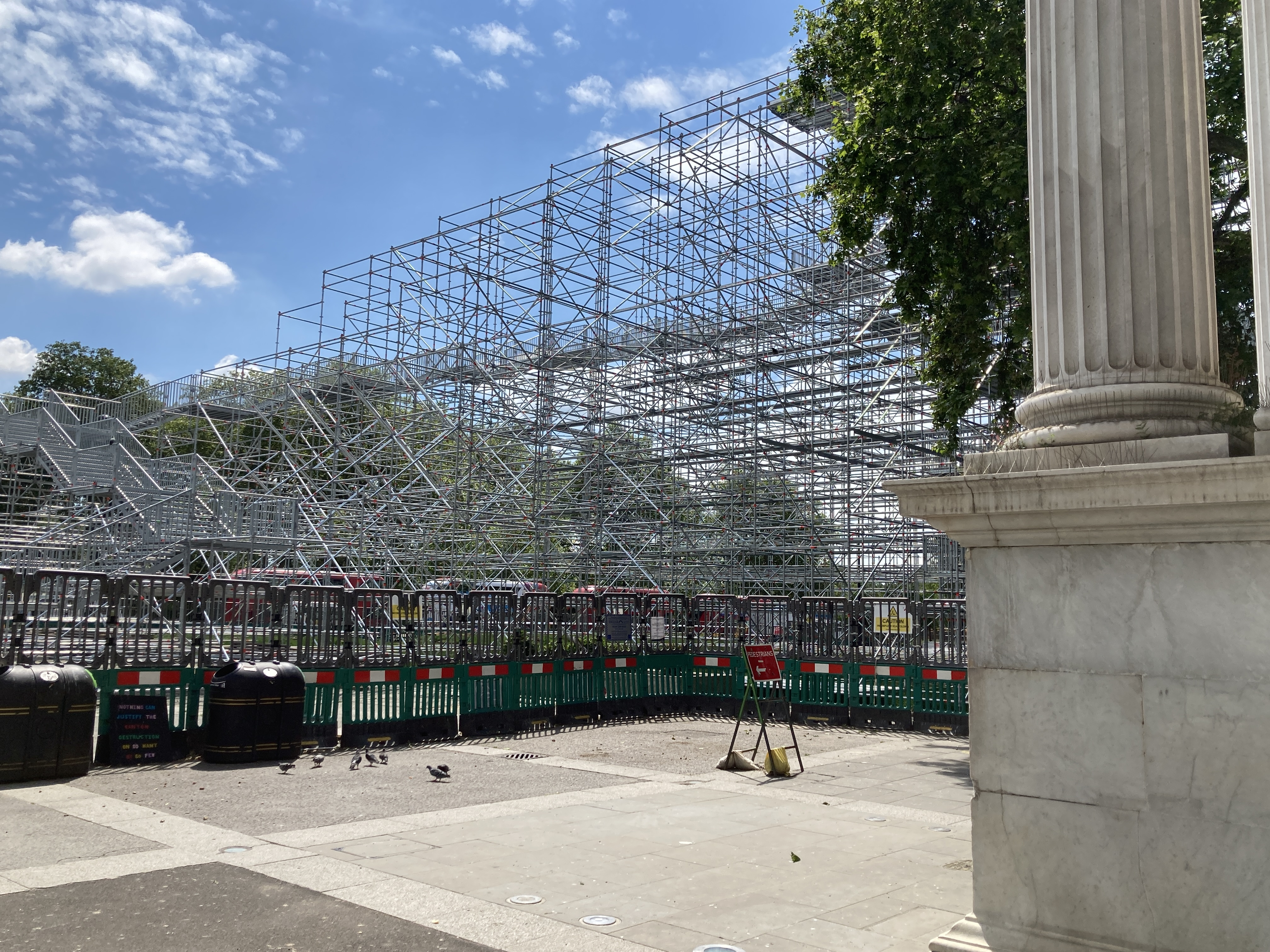
The Mound under construction in early June

The hill was announced in February 2021 as part of a £150 million development initiative by Westminster City Council. Planning permission was sought in the same month, and construction began in May. The original forecast cost was £3.3 million; by August 2021 the total cost, including construction, operation and removal, had risen to £6 million.

On 13 August 2021, the deputy leader of Westminster City Council and project lead Melvyn Caplan resigned in the wake of the cost increase. Council leader Rachel Robathan described the almost doubling in cost as "totally unacceptable" and a review was launched to "understand what went wrong and ensure it never happens again".

The review was published on 19 October 2021 and found that the failures in the project's management were "both avoidable and particularly devastating".

== Opening ==
London landmarks could be seen from the summit, such as the London Eye and The Shard.

The attraction opened to the public on 26 July 2021. The entrance fee ranged between £4.50 and £8.00. It was described by The Guardian as "[looking] parched and patchy, more like an ensemble of ill-matched carpet tiles than a greensward. The trees were looking skinnier and less luxurious than the computer-generated promotional images had suggested." It was compared to the hill from the children's show Teletubbies, and landscapes from computer games such as The Sims, Super Mario 64 and Minecraft.

Some visitors complained that the hill did not match the marketing photos, with one visitor describing it as "the worst thing I've ever done in London", and commenting that it was not possible to view the park from the hill due to trees in the way – but it was possible to view a rubble pile. Days after opening, and following several complaints from disappointed visitors, Westminster City Council acknowledged that advertised elements of the Mound were "not yet ready for visitors", and closed ticket booking until August so that "teething problems" could be resolved, and plants could bed in and grow. MVRDV said that "working with plants is unpredictable, especially in challenging weather conditions".

The first visitors to the hill were offered refunds and a free return ticket. The hill reopened on 9 August, with an announcement that entry would be free of charge for the rest of the month. In September, free entry was extended for the full duration of the hill's presence at Marble Arch.

The mound drew around 250,000 visitors in total, according to Westminster Council.

== Dismantling ==
The mound remained open to the public until 9 January 2022, after which time a four-month dismantling process began at a cost of £660,000. It was intended that the trees would be distributed around Westminster and to local schools, and that other greenery would be recycled.
