= Mark Coreth =

British artist

Mark Coreth (born 1958) is a British artist.

== Biography ==
Mark Coreth was born in London in 1958 and was immediately dispatched to the family farm in the Kenyan highlands where the Equator ran through the house. Black and white colobus monkeys leapt amongst the branches in the trees behind the house where leopard and cheetah also lived. This idyllic childhood fostered Mark's early and continuing passion for wildlife.

After prep school in Kenya, Mark attended Ampleforth College, and on leaving he joined The Blues and Royals, serving with the Regiment as a regular officer. He has spent time in England, Cyprus, Germany, Northern Ireland and the Falkland Islands during the 1982 hostilities. On his return to England he was commissioned to make a silver sculpture of his regiment's drum horse "Belisarius" for the Warrant Officer's Mess, and later a second cast in bronze became the Household Cavalry's wedding present to the Duke and Duchess of York; this was Coreth's first commission.

His specially commissioned work includes a pair of life-sized cheetah in a bronze tree for the ruling family of Dubai, a large figure for the re-launch of Shakespeare's Globe Theatre, and the monumental Millennium sculpture The Waterhole at the Natural History Museum in London, which incorporates over 50 animals.

The Coreth one-man exhibitions at the Sladmore are bi-annual events. He also has regular foreign shows. Mark's son Jamie is a painter

== Ice Bear Project ==
The Ice Bear Project is a not-for-profit arts organisation, inspired by Mark Coreth. Coreth witnessed the effects of climate change when he first travelled to Baffin Island during November 2007. He knew that few will ever experience the Arctic, and so decided to bring the Arctic to everyone in the form of an Ice Bear sculptural event.

== Collections ==
The following people all have works by Mark Coreth in their collections (or did so during their lifetimes):

- Queen Elizabeth II
- The Duke and Duchess of York
- The Sultan of Brunei
- The Ruling Family, Dubai, UAE
- The Earl and Countess of Halifax
- The Marquess of Hartington
- Sir Anthony Bamford
- Sir Christopher Lever
- Mary, Lady Fairfax
- The Natural History Museum, London
- Shakespeare's Globe, London
- Anthony Garnett, London
