= Melvyn Caplan =

British Conservative politician

Leader of Westminster City Council
- In office 1995–2000
- Preceded by: Miles Young
- Succeeded by: Simon Milton

Personal details
- Party: Conservative
- Occupation: Councillor

Melvyn Caplan is a British Conservative politician. He has been a councillor for Little Venice since 1990. He was the leader of Westminster City Council from 1995 to 2000. Until his resignation in 2021, he was the Deputy Leader of the council and Cabinet Member for Finance, Property and Regeneration.

== Marble Arch Mound ==
Marble Arch Mound

In February 2021, it was announced that Westminster City Council were constructing a temporary landmark called Marble Arch Mound with Caplan being the project's lead, as part of a plan to revitalise Oxford Street after the closure of several large retailers during the COVID-19 pandemic.

In August 2021, Caplan resigned as Deputy Leader of Westminster City Council after the cost of Marble Arch Mound had risen to £6 million. Westminster City Council leader Rachael Robathan announced the instigation of an internal review "to understand what went wrong and ensure it never happens again".
