= Tachbrook (ward) =

- Former electoral ward for the Westminster City Council
- Tachbrook ward boundaries from 2002 to 2022
- Borough: Westminster
- County: Greater London
- Electorate: 5,733 (2018)

Former electoral ward
- Created: 1965 (1st iteration); 2002 (2nd iteration)
- Abolished: 1968 (1st iteration); 2022 (2nd iteration)
- Councillors: 1965–1968: 1; 2002–2022: 3
- GSS code: E05000645 (2002–2022)

Tachbrook was an electoral ward in the City of Westminster. The ward was originally created in 1965 and abolished in 1968. It was created again in 2002 and abolished in 2022. It returned councillors to Westminster City Council.

== 2002–2022 Westminster council elections ==
=== 2018 election ===
The election took place on 3 May 2018.

2018 Westminster City Council election: Tachbrook (3)
Party	Candidate	Votes	%	±%
Conservative	Angela Harvey	1,409	52.1	+2.5
Conservative	Jim Glen	1,400	51.8	+1.8
Conservative	James Spencer	1,326	49.1	−0.4
Labour	Gillian Arrindell	1,051	38.9	+13.2
Labour	Terry Harper	1,008	37.3	+13.0
Labour	William Thomson	951	35.2	+12.9
Liberal Democrats	Sarah Tebbit	236	8.7	−1.8
Liberal Democrats	Sophie Service	210	7.8	−1.3
Liberal Democrats	Paul Pettinger	209	7.7	+1.7
Majority		275	10.2	
Turnout		7800	47.3	+9.9
Conservative hold		Swing		
Conservative hold		Swing		
Conservative hold		Swing		

=== 2014 election ===
The election took place on 22 May 2014.

2014 Westminster City Council election: Tachbrook (3)
Party	Candidate	Votes	%	±%
Conservative	Nick Evans	1,103	50.0	
Conservative	Angela Harvey	1,095	49.6	
Conservative	Peter Cuthbertson	1,093	49.5	
Labour	Gillian Guy	568	25.7	
Labour	Joe Darrall	537	24.3	
Labour	William Thomson	493	22.3	
UKIP	Krystal Bonnie Painter	274	12.4	
Green	Conrad Guy Rubin	268	12.1	
Liberal Democrats	Elizabeth Armstrong	231	10.5	
Liberal Democrats	Pippa Johnson	200	9.1	
Liberal Democrats	Tim Mougenot	132	6.0	
Majority		525	23.8	
Turnout		5994	37.4	−21.4
Conservative hold		Swing		
Conservative hold		Swing		
Conservative hold		Swing		

=== 2010 election ===
The election on 6 May 2010 took place on the same day as the United Kingdom general election.

=== 2006 election ===
The election took place on 4 May 2006.

2006 Westminster City Council election: Tachbrook (3)
Party	Candidate	Votes	%	±%
Conservative	Alan Bradley	1,504	63.3	
Conservative	Angela Harvey	1,475		
Conservative	Nicholas Evans	1,464		
Labour	Hatty Cadman	494	20.8	
Labour	Markus Campbell-Savours	454		
Labour	William Thomson	451		
Liberal Democrats	Victoria Adamson	378	15.9	
Liberal Democrats	Josephine Hayes	327		
Liberal Democrats	David Wilks	285		
Turnout			36.5	
Conservative hold		Swing		
Conservative hold		Swing		
Conservative hold		Swing		

=== 2002 election ===
The election took place on 2 May 2002.

== 1964–1968 Westminster council elections ==
=== 1964 election ===
The election took place on 7 May 1964.

1964 Westminster City Council election: Tachbrook (1)
Party	Candidate	Votes	%	±%
Labour	H. Garside	803		
Conservative	A. Johnston	734		
Turnout		1,549	46.3	
Labour win (new seat)				
