= 2023 New Year Honours =

British royal recognitions

The 2023 New Year Honours are appointments by some of the 15 Commonwealth realms to various orders and honours to recognise and reward good works by citizens of those countries. The New Year Honours are awarded as part of the New Year celebrations at the start of January and those for 2023 were announced on 30 December 2022.

The recipients of honours are displayed as they were styled before their new honour and arranged by the country whose ministers advised Charles III on the appointments, then by the honour and by the honour's grade (i.e. Knight/Dame Grand Cross, Knight/Dame Commander, etc.), and then by divisions (i.e. Civil, Diplomatic, and Military), as appropriate.

The 2023 New Year Honours was the first honours list issued by King Charles III.

== United Kingdom ==
Below are the individuals appointed by Charles III in his right as King of the United Kingdom with honours within his own gift and with the advice of the Government for other honours.

=== The Order of the Companions of Honour ===
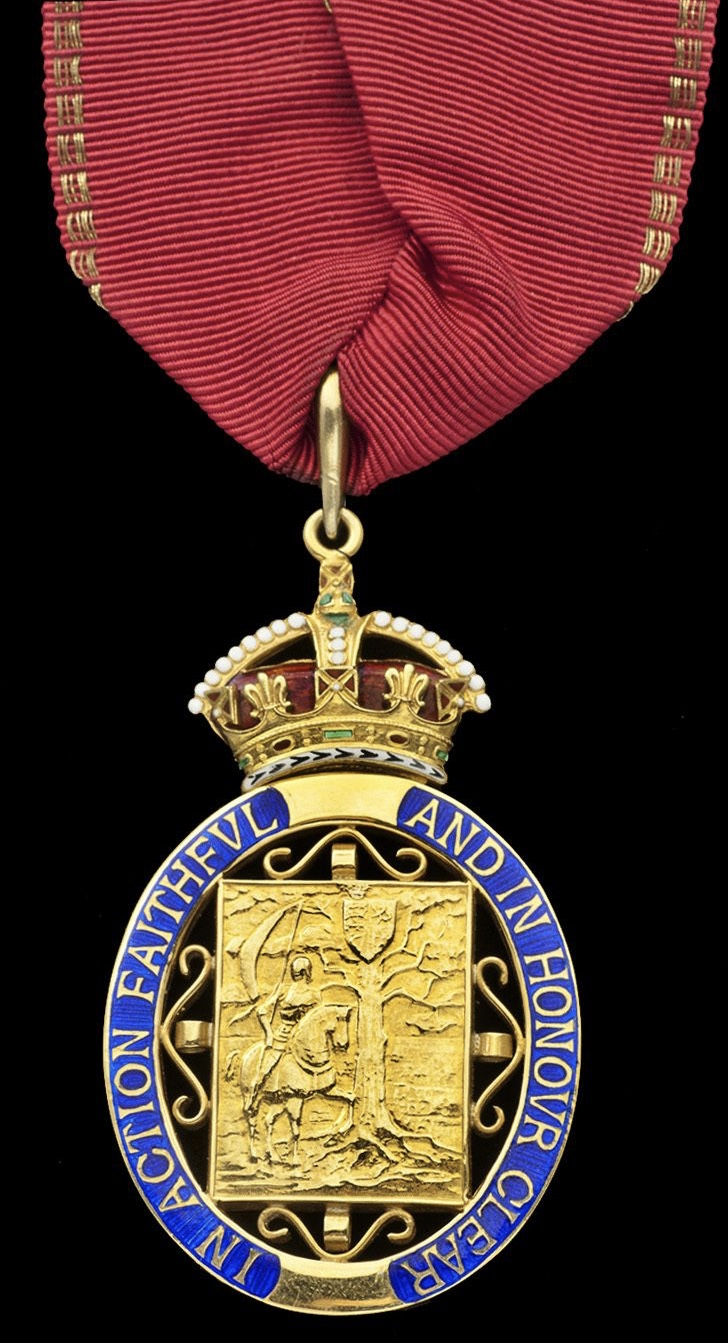
Riband and badge of a Member of the Order of the Companions of Honour

==== Member of the Order of Companions of Honour (CH) ====
- Dame Barbara Mary Plunket Greene (Mary Quant), DBE, Fashion Designer. For services to Fashion.
- Professor Sir Michael Gideon Marmot, Director, Institute of Health Equity, University College London. For services to Public Health.

=== Knight Bachelor ===
- John Akomfrah, CBE, Visual Artist. For services to the Arts.
- Professor James Louis John Appleby, CBE, Professor of Psychiatry, University of Manchester and Chair, National Suicide Prevention Strategy Advisory Group. For services to Medicine and Mental Health.
- Ian Bauckham, CBE, Chair, Ofqual. For services to Education.
- Professor Vernon Bernard Bogdanor, CBE FBA, Professor of Government, King's College London. For services to Political Science.
- Christopher John Bryant, MP, Member of Parliament for Rhondda and Chair, Commons Committee on Standards. For Political and Public Service.
- Professor Ian Trevelyan Chapman, Chief Executive Officer, UK Atomic Energy Authority. For services to Global Fusion Energy.
- John Rawcliffe Airey Crabtree, OBE DL, Chair, Organising Committee, 2022 Commonwealth Games. For services to Sport and to the community in the West Midlands.
- Roland Francis Kester Keating, Chief Executive, The British Library. For services to Literature.
- Professor Mayur Keshavji Lakhani, CBE, Chair, Faculty of Medical Leadership and Management and General Practitioner, Highgate Medical Centre, Loughborough. For services to General Practice.
- The Right Honourable Dr Julian Murray Lewis, MP, Member of Parliament for New Forest East and Chair, Intelligence and Security Committee. For Political and Public Service.
- Professor Peter William Mathieson, Principal and Vice-Chancellor, University of Edinburgh. For services to Higher Education.
- Dr Brian Harold May, CBE, Musician, Songwriter and Animal Welfare Advocate. For services to Music and to Charity.
- Ivan Manuel Menezes, Chief Executive Officer, Diageo plc. For services to Business and to Equality.
- Robin John Christian Millar, CBE, Founder and Group Chair, Blue Raincoat Chrysalis Group. For services to Music, to People with Disabilities, to Young People and to Charity.
- Grayson Perry, CBE, Artist, Writer and Broadcaster. For services to the Arts.
- Dr Martin Peter Read, CBE, Chairman, Wincanton plc. For services to Industry and for Public and Voluntary Service.
- Luke Philip Hardwick Rittner, CBE, Chief Executive, Royal Academy of Dance. For services to Dance and the Arts.
- William George Robertson, CBE DL, Executive Chairman, Robertson Group. For services to the Construction Industry and to Charity in Scotland.
- Norman Keith Skeoch, lately Chair, Investment Association and Ring Fencing and Proprietary Trading Review. For services to the Financial Sector.

=== The Most Honourable Order of the Bath ===
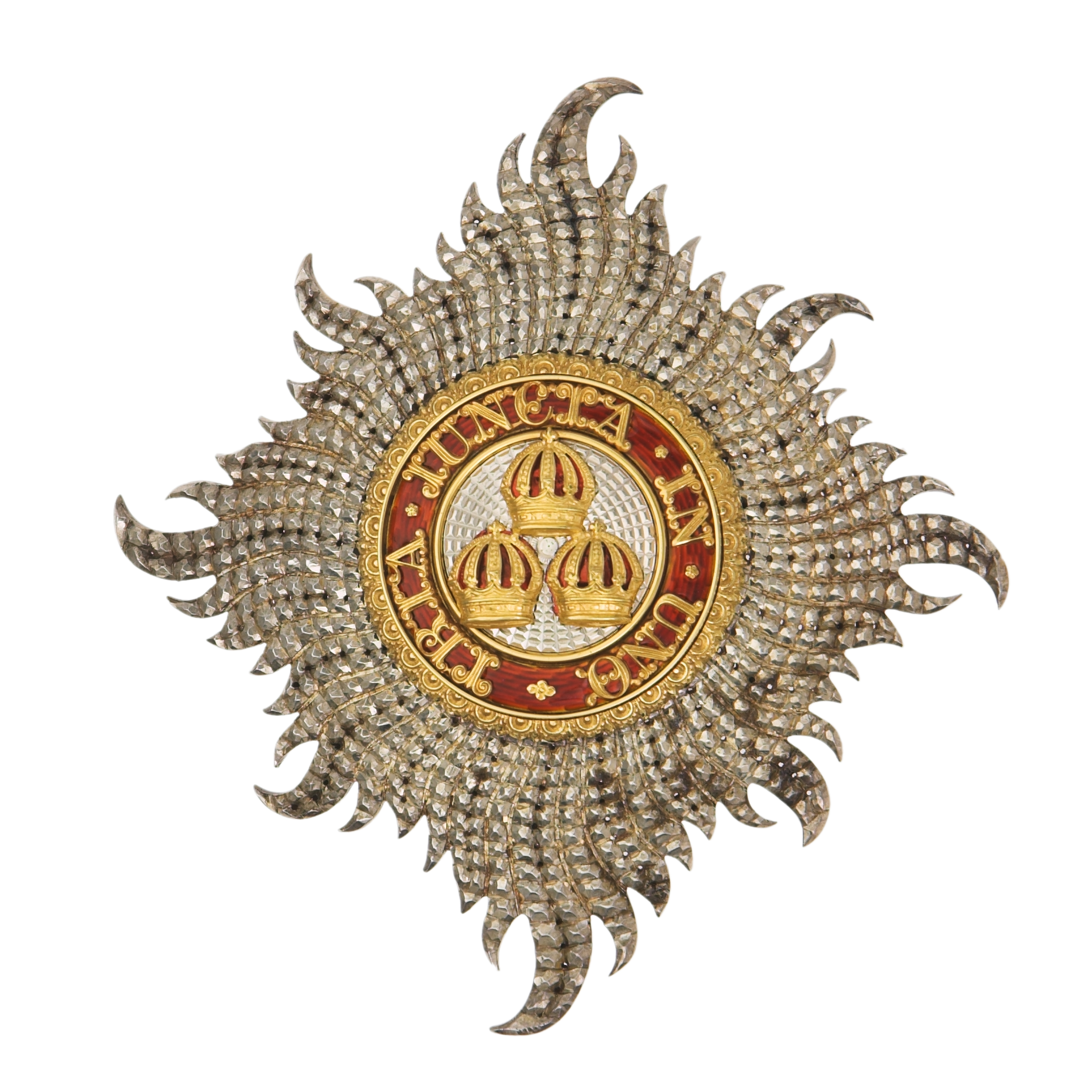
Breast star for a civilian Knight / Dame Grand Cross of the Order of the Bath

==== Knight Grand Cross of the Order of the Bath (GCB) ====
Civil

- Sir Thomas Whinfield Scholar, KCB, lately Permanent Secretary, H.M. Treasury. For Public Service.

==== Knight Commander of the Order of the Bath (KCB) ====
Military

- Vice Admiral Keith Edward Blount, CB OBE
- Vice Admiral Nicholas William Hine, CB
- Lieutenant General Charles Roland Vincent Walker, DSO

Civil

- Dr. John Stuart Benger, Clerk to the House of Commons. For services to Parliament.

==== Companion of the Order of the Bath (CB) ====
Military

- Vice Admiral Paul Marshall, CBE
- Major General James Andrew John Morris, DSO
- Vice Admiral Guy Antony Robinson, OBE
- Major General Ludwig Karl Ford, CBE
- Major General Simon John Malise Graham, VR
- Lieutenant-General James Francis Pardoe Swift, OBE
- Air Vice-Marshal Colin David Da'Silva
- Air Vice-Marshal Ian Francis Vallely, OBE

Civil

- Ian Anthony Booth, Chief Executive, Submarine Delivery Agency, Ministry of Defence. For services to Defence.
- Dr. Nina Cope, lately Director General, National Crime Agency. For services to Law Enforcement and to Diversity.
- Philip Copple, Director General Operations, H.M. Prison and Probation Service. For services to Justice and to Charity.
- Dominic James Herrington, lately National Schools Commissioner. For services to Education.
- Catherine Little, lately Director General, Public Spending, H.M. Treasury. For Public Service.
- Dr. Christine Helen Middlemiss, Chief Veterinary Officer, Department for Environment, Food and Rural Affairs. For services to the Veterinary and Farming Sectors.
- Mark Darren Sweeney, Director General, Economic and Domestic Secretariat, Cabinet Office. For Public Service.
- Gaven Nicholas Smith, Director General, Foreign, Commonwealth and Development Office. For services to British foreign policy.

=== The Most Distinguished Order of Saint Michael and Saint George ===
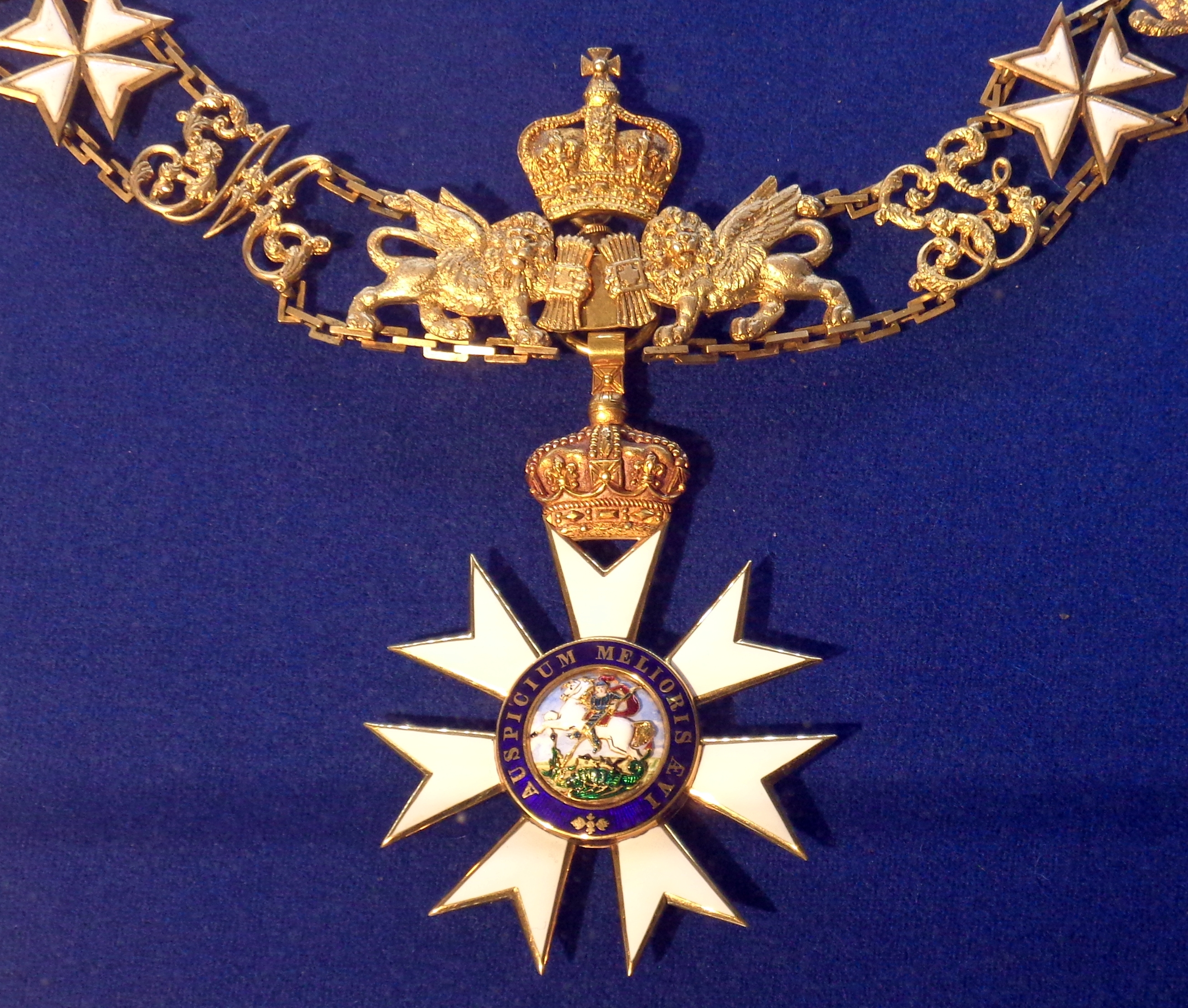
Collar and badge of a Knight / Dame Grand Cross of the Order of St. Michael and St. George

==== Knight Grand Cross of the Order of St Michael and St George (GCMG) ====
- The Lord Sedwill, KCMG, former Cabinet Secretary and National Security Adviser. For services to British foreign policy, to National Security and H.M. Government.

==== Knight / Dame Commander of the Order of St Michael and St George (KCMG / DCMG) ====
- Deborah Jane Bronnert, CMG, H.M. Ambassador Moscow, Russia. For services to British foreign policy.
- Professor Fiona Elizabeth Murray, CBE, Associate Dean of Innovation and Inclusion and William Porter Professor of Entrepreneurship, Massachusetts Institute of Technology School of Management, United States of America. For services to Science, to Technology and to Diversity.
- Melinda Veronica Simmons, H.M. Ambassador Kyiv, Ukraine. For services to British foreign policy.
- Masood Ahmed, President, Center for Global Development. For services to International Development.
- Dr. Mohamed Fathi Ahmed Ibrahim, Founder, the Mo Ibrahim Foundation. For services to Charity and to Philanthropy.
- Dr. David Nunes Nabarro, CBE, World Health Organisation Special Envoy for Covid-19 Prevention and Response. For services to Global Health.
- Matthew John Rycroft, CBE, Permanent Secretary, Home Office. For services to British Diplomacy, Development and Domestic Policy.
- The Right Honourable Alok Kumar Sharma, MP, President, the United Nations Climate Change Conference of the Parties (COP26). For services to tackling Climate Change.

==== Companion of the Order of St Michael and St George (CMG) ====
- Stephanie Jane Al-Qaq, lately Director, Middle East and North Africa Directorate, Foreign, Commonwealth and Development Office. For services to British foreign policy.
- Matthew John Burney, British Council Director, China. For services to UK cultural relations overseas.
- Emma Clare Gardiner, Director General, Foreign, Commonwealth and Development Office. For services to British foreign policy.
- Richard Michael John Ogilvie Graham, MP, Prime Minister's Trade Envoy to Indonesia, Malaysia, the Philippines and the Association of Southeast Asian Nations (ASEAN). For services to Trade and Investment in South-East Asia.
- Dr. Lawrence James Haddad, Executive Director, Global Alliance for Improved Nutrition (GAIN). For services to International Nutrition, Food and Agriculture.
- Martin Fergus Harris, lately Director, Eastern Europe and Central Asia Directorate, Foreign, Commonwealth and Development Office. For services to British foreign policy.
- Edward Andrew Beauchamp Hobart, Director, Estates, Security and Network Directorate, Foreign, Commonwealth and Development Office. For services to British foreign policy and to National Security.
- Alan Johnson, President, the International Federation of Accountants. For services to the Accountancy profession.
- Malcolm Johnson, Deputy Secretary General, International Telecommunication Union, United Nations, Geneva, Switzerland. For services to The United Nations, to the Commonwealth and to global Information and Communication Technologies.
- Professor Maxine Deirdre Molyneux, Professor of Sociology, University College London Institute of the Americas. For services to International Development and UK/Latin America relations.
- Richard Hugh Montgomery, lately UK Representative and Group Executive Director, World Bank. For services to British foreign policy and to International Development.
- Dr. John Evan Murton, Conference of the Parties (COP26) Envoy, Foreign, Commonwealth and Development Office. For services to British foreign policy and to Climate Change.
- Ailsa Juliana Terry, Director, Sanctions Taskforce, Foreign, Commonwealth and Development Office. For services to British foreign policy.
- David Gerald Wolseley Wightwick, Chief Executive Officer, UK-Med. For services to UK humanitarian support.

=== Royal Victorian Order ===
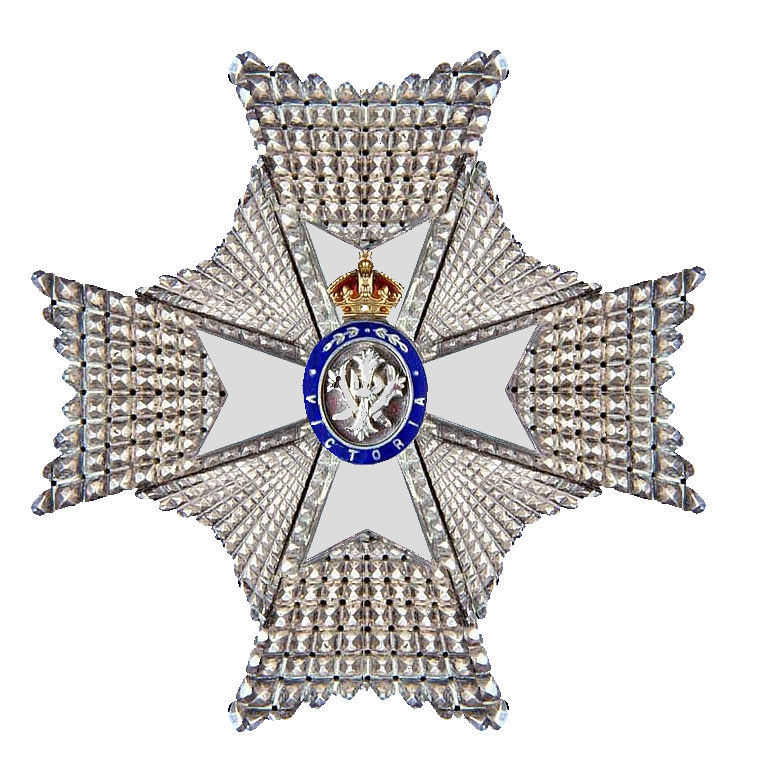
Breast star of a Knight / Dame Commander of the Royal Victorian Order

==== Knight Commander of the Royal Victorian Order (KCVO) ====
- Sir Nicholas Hickman Ponsonby Bacon, Bt., OBE DL, lately Lord Warden of the Stannaries and Member of The Prince's Council, Duchy of Cornwall.

==== Commander of the Royal Victorian Order (CVO) ====
- Eleanor Gore, the Countess of Arran, MBE DL, lately Member of The Prince's Council, Duchy of Cornwall.
- David Mark Bevan, Managing Director, Coutts & Co.
- The Honourable Virginia Carington, LVO, lately Assistant Master of the Household to The former Prince of Wales and The Duchess of Cornwall.
- Professor Justin Peter Cobb, Orthopaedic Surgeon to Her Late Majesty The Queen and the Royal Household.
- Jonathan Rupert Crow, KC, lately Attorney General, Duchy of Cornwall.
- Her Excellency The Honourable Linda Marion Dessau, AC, Governor of Victoria, Australia.
- Paul Robert Edgar Double, LVO, For services to the Platinum Jubilee of Her Late Majesty The Queen, Remembrancer, City of London.
- Adrian Anthony Joseph Evans, LVO, For services to the Platinum Jubilee of Her Late Majesty The Queen, Pageant Master, Platinum Jubilee Pageant.
- Margaret Eleanor Hammond, LVO, Lady in Waiting to The Princess Royal.
- Claire Theresa Hensman, Lord-Lieutenant of Cumbria.
- Donald Martin, lately Lord-Lieutenant of the Western Isles.
- Her Honour The Honourable Vicki Susan O'Halloran, AO, Administrator of the Northern Territory, Australia.
- Bruno Mark Peek, LVO OBE, For services to the Platinum Jubilee of Her Late Majesty The Queen, Pageant Master, The Queen's Platinum Jubilee Beacons.
- Claire Louise Popplewell, For services to the Platinum Jubilee of Her Late Majesty The Queen, BBC Creative Director, Platinum Jubilee Weekend.
- James Henry Lavallin Puxley, Lord-Lieutenant of Berkshire.
- John Holmes Stephen, lately Member of The Prince's Council, Duchy of Cornwall.
- Bernard John Taylor, CBE DL, lately Chairman, Royal Commission for the 1851 Exhibition.
- David Mark Thomas, lately Member of The Prince's Council, Duchy of Cornwall.
- Michael Lindo Charles Webster, lately Secretary of the Cabinet and Clerk of the Executive Council of New Zealand.
- James Piran Williams, DL, lately Member of The Prince's Council, Duchy of Cornwall.

==== Lieutenant of the Royal Victorian Order (LVO) ====
- David Charles Curtis, MVO, lately Land Steward, Eastern District, Duchy of Cornwall.
- Dr. Alasdair John Emslie, For occupational health services to the Royal Household, Chief Medical Officer, Health Partners Group.
- William James Furber, lately Solicitor, Duchy of Cornwall.
- Barbara Ann Gray, QPM, Assistant Commissioner, Metropolitan Police Service. For services to Royalty Protection.
- Christopher Michael Gregory, MVO, lately Land Steward, Western District, and the Isles of Scilly, Duchy of Cornwall.
- Siân Elizabeth Joseph, For services to the Platinum Jubilee of Her Late Majesty The Queen, Deputy Director, Ceremonials, Department for Culture, Media and Sport.
- Ceri Jane Ellen King, Head of Secretariat and Deputy Clerk, Privy Council.
- Jason Matthew Knauf, lately Chief Executive Officer, The Royal Foundation, and Senior Advisor to The Prince and Princess of Wales.
- Sara Matthews Latham, For services to the Platinum Jubilee of Her Late Majesty The Queen, Senior Advisor, Platinum Jubilee and Special Projects, Royal Household.
- Colonel Crispin Alexander Lockhart, MBE, For services to the Platinum Jubilee of Her Late Majesty The Queen, Silver Stick in Waiting.
- Rosanna Manuela Machado, For services to the Platinum Jubilee of Her Late Majesty The Queen, Chief Executive Officer, Platinum Jubilee Pageant.
- Amanda Felicity Mackenzie, OBE, lately Chief Executive, Business in the Community, The Prince's Responsible Business Network.
- Colonel Michael John Miller, Official Secretary to the Governor of New South Wales, Australia.
- Dr. James Anthony O'Donnell, lately Organist and Master of the Choristers, Westminster Abbey.
- Robert John Pooley, MBE, For services to the Royal Household, Managing Director, Pooley Sword.
- Louis William Edward Randall, Head of Operations (London), Property Section, Royal Household.
- Stephen John Martin Sheasby, MVO, Senior Gilding Conservator, Royal Collection, Royal Household.
- Peter John Stewart, MVO, For services to the Platinum Jubilee of Her Late Majesty The Queen, Executive Director of Outreach and Development, The Eden Project, The Big Jubilee Lunch.
- Rustom Tata, MVO, For services to the Royal Household, Partner, D. M. H. Stallard.
- Peter Laurence Taylor, For services to the Platinum Jubilee of Her Late Majesty The Queen, BBC Head of Outside Broadcast Operations, Platinum Jubilee Weekend.
- Mark Walenty Wasilewski, MVO, For services to the Platinum Jubilee of Her Late Majesty The Queen, Manager, Royal Parks.
- The Reverend Canon Paul Stephen Wright, Sub Dean of His Majesty's Chapels Royal and Domestic Chaplain.

==== Member of the Royal Victorian Order (MVO) ====
- Adesola Monsuru Adelekan, Commander, Metropolitan Police Service. For services to Royalty Protection.
- Dale Bone, Correspondence Officer, Private Secretary's Office, Royal Household.
- Lindsey Jane Brummitt, For services to the Platinum Jubilee of Her Late Majesty The Queen, Programme Director, The Big Jubilee Lunch.
- James Chih Kin Chin, Page of the Cellars, Master of the Household's Department, Royal Household.
- Carey Elizabeth Chung, House Manager and Personal Assistant to the Lieutenant-Governor, Isle of Man.
- Charles Fraser Craven, lately Estate Manager, Highgrove.
- Katherine Elizabeth Eaton, For services to the Platinum Jubilee of Her Late Majesty The Queen, Special Projects Lead, Westminster Council.
- Kathryn Elizabeth Gillham, Senior Records Officer, Private Secretary's Office, Royal Household.
- Celia Helen Guy, lately Correspondence Manager, Private Secretary's Office, Royal Household.
- Simon David Hammett, lately Inspector, Metropolitan Police Service. For services to Royalty Protection.
- Catriona Innes, lately Clerk to the Lieutenancy of Glasgow and Advisor to the Lord Provost of Glasgow.
- Julia Margaret Knight, Lieutenancy Officer, Somerset.
- Emma Rose Mager, Senior Events and Visits Manager, Household of The Prince and Princess of Wales.
- Alun Thomas Mainwaring, For services to the Platinum Jubilee of Her Late Majesty The Queen, Head of Events and Filming, Royal Parks.
- Katharine Owen, Head of Publishing, Royal Collection, Royal Household.
- Michelle Poole, Personal Assistant to the Ladies in Waiting to Her Late Majesty The Queen, Royal Household.
- Mark Anthony Randall, Deputy Retail Manager, Royal Collection, Royal Household.
- Cathy Lynne Bursey-Sabourin, Fraser Herald and Principal Artist, Canadian Heraldic Authority.
- Zoë Alexandra Ware, lately Assistant Private Secretary to The Duke of Cambridge.
- Fiona Ann Wilson, lately Sergeant, Metropolitan Police Service. For services to Royalty Protection.
- David Zolkwer, For services to the Platinum Jubilee of Her Late Majesty The Queen, Show Director, Platinum Jubilee Pageant.

Honorary

- Katrin Richardt, Operations Manager, F Branch, Master of the Household's Department, Royal Household.

=== Royal Victorian Medal (RVM) ===
Ribbon of an ordinary member of the Royal Victorian Order

==== Royal Victorian Medal (Silver) ====
- Andrew Alloway, Assistant Groundsman, Crown Estate, Windsor.
- Jonathan David Brown, Farms Tractor Engineer, Sandringham Estate.
- Wayne David Coupland, Signwriter, Crown Estate, Windsor.
- Michael Devlin, Castle Attendant, Master of the Household's Department, Royal Household.
- Christopher James Drewitt, Carriage Restorer/Cleaner, Royal Mews, Royal Household.
- Dawn Patricia Murphy, Hairdresser to The Princess Royal.
- William Tuffs, Messenger Sergeant Major, The King's Body Guard of the Yeomen of the Guard.
- Peter James Wilson, Horticulturalist, Crown Estate, Windsor.

Bar

- David Gerald Hutchins, RVM, Horticulturalist, Crown Estate, Windsor.

Honorary

- Krzysztof Janusz Nowak, lately General Catering Assistant, Master of the Household's Department, Royal Household.

=== The Most Excellent Order of the British Empire ===
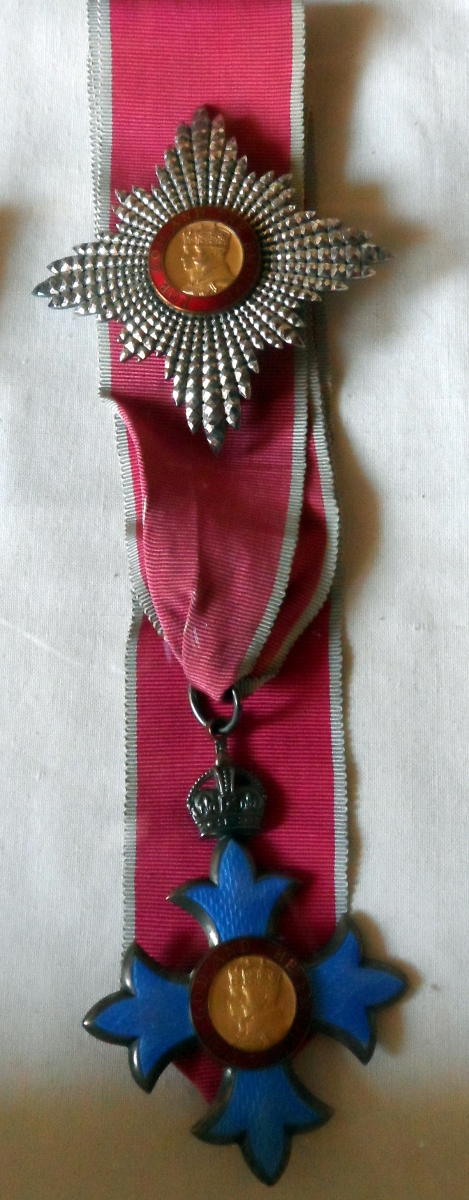
Breast star and neck badge of a Knight Commander of the Order of the British Empire

==== Knight / Dame Grand Cross of the Order of the British Empire (GBE) ====
Civil

- Professor Sir Partha Sarathi Dasgupta, Frank Ramsey Professor Emeritus of Economics, University of Cambridge. For services to Economics and to the Natural Environment.
- Professor Dame Hermione Lee, DBE FBA, Emeritus Professor of English Literature, University of Oxford. For services to English Literature.

==== Knight / Dame Commander of the Order of the British Empire (KBE / DBE) ====
Civil

- Dawn Elizabeth Childs, FREng, President, Women's Engineering Society. For services to Engineering.
- Professor Lyn Susan Chitty, Professor of Genetics and Fetal Medicine, Great Ormond Street Hospital for Children NHS Foundation Trust and University College London Great Ormond Street Institute of Child Health. For services to Medicine.
- Nicola Whitmont Dandridge, CBE, lately Chief Executive Officer, Office for Students. For services to Higher Education.
- Sally Anne Sheila Dicketts, CBE, lately Chief Executive Officer, Activate Learning. For services to Education.
- Anita Margaret Frew, Chair, Rolls-Royce Holdings plc and Chair, Croda International plc. For services to Business and to the Economy.
- Denise Rosemarie Lewis, OBE, President, Commonwealth Games England. For services to Sport.
- Dr Julie Katherine Maxton, CBE, Executive Director, The Royal Society. For services to Science and to the Law.
- Professor Heather Jane McGregor, CBE FRSE, Provost and Vice Principal, Heriot-Watt University Dubai. For services to Education, to Business and to Heritage in Scotland.
- Virginia Anne McKenna, OBE, Co-Founder, Born Free Foundation. For services to Wildlife Conservation and Wild Animal Welfare.
- Professor Cathryn Elizabeth Nutbrown, Professor, School of Education, University of Sheffield. For services to Early Childhood Education.
- Norma Redfearn, CBE, Mayor, North Tyneside Council. For Political and Public Service.
- Professor Robina Shahnaz Shah, MBE DL JP, Director, Doubleday Centre for Patient Experience. For services to Patient Care.
- Alison Rose-Slade (Alison Rose), Chief Executive Officer, NatWest Group. For services to the Financial Sector.
- Chief Rabbi Ephraim Yitzchak Mirvis, For services to the Jewish Community, to Interfaith Relations and to Education.

==== Commander of the Order of the British Empire (CBE) ====
Military

- Commodore Peter Coulson
- Commodore Stuart Philip Henderson
- Captain John Lewis Rutland Foreman
- Major General Mark Pullan, MBE
- Brigadier Ben James Cattermole, MBE
- Brigadier Edwin David Colthup
- Brigadier Khashayar Dominic Sharifi, OBE
- Air Commodore Nicholas John Hay, OBE
- Air Commodore James Havard Hunter
- Air Commodore Stephen Paul Kilvington

Civil

- Nadra Ahmed, OBE DL, Executive Chair, National Care Association. For services to Social Care.
- Dawid Konotey-Ahulu, Co-founder, 10,000 Interns Foundation. For services to Diversity and Inclusion.
- Janet Alexander, Director, Compliance Operations, H.M. Revenue and Customs. For Public Service.
- Anthony Lewis Arter, lately Pensions Ombudsman. For services to the Pensions Industry and to Charity.
- Clara Barby, lately Chief Executive Officer, Impact Management Project. For services to International Sustainability Standards.
- Professor Richard David Bardgett, Professor of Ecology, University of Manchester. For services to Soil Ecology and to Climate Change Science.
- Lesley Batchelor, OBE, Export Champion and Entrepreneur. For services to International Trade.
- Madeleine Lola Margaret, The Countess of Bessborough, OBE, Founder, New Art Centre. For services to Art Education and to Salisbury Cathedral.
- Octavius Orlando Irvine Casati Black, Co-founder and Chief Executive Officer, MindGym and Co-founder, ParentGym. For services to Entrepreneurship, to Business, to Life Sciences and to the Community.
- John Peter Boden, Founder, Boden. For services to Fashion and to the Retail Sector.
- Dr Katherine Cane, Deputy Director, Ministry of Defence. For services to Defence.
- John Clive William Avon Caulcutt, For services to Charity and to Philanthropy.
- Professor Vengalil Krishna Kumar Chatterjee, FRS, Professor of Endocrinology, University of Cambridge. For services to People with Endocrine Disorders.
- Fergus Dalziel Cochrane, For services to the Scottish Parliament.
- Dean Philip Creamer, OBE, Director, Commonwealth Games and Blythe House Programme, Department for Digital, Culture, Media and Sport. For Public Service.
- Professor David Christopher Crossman, Chief Scientist (Health) Scottish Government. For services to Public Health in Scotland.
- Professor Andrew David Curran, Chief Scientific Adviser and Director of Research, Health and Safety Executive. For Public Service.
- Lesley Jean Davies, OBE, Chair, Hull College. For services to Further Education.
- Professor Christopher Paul Day, DL, Vice-Chancellor and President, Newcastle University. For services to Health Research and Treatment.
- Rosamund Adoo-Kissi-Debrah, Co-Founder and Chair, the Ella Roberta Family Foundation. For services to Public Health.
- Professor Robert Alan Dover, Chairman, Advanced Propulsion Centre UK. For services to the Automotive Industry.
- Graham Ramsay Duncan, lately Deputy Director, Care and Reform Team, Department for Levelling Up, Housing and Communities. For services to Local Government.
- Professor Jane Cecilia Falkingham, OBE, Professor of Demography and International Social Policy, University of Southampton. For services to Demographic Research.
- Professor John Mitchell Finnis, AC KC FBA, Professor and Legal Academic. For services to Legal Scholarship.
- Professor Rebecca Jane Francis, FBA, Chief Executive Officer, Education Endowment Foundation. For services to Education.
- Sonia Anne Primrose Friedman, OBE, Theatre Producer and Founder, Sonia Friedman Productions. For services to Theatre.
- Jeffrey Simon Langford Garrett, Head of Global Issues, Ministry of Defence. For services to Defence.
- Rebecca Gay George, OBE, lately Past President, British Computing Society. For services to Diversity in the Technology Profession.
- Professor Paul Glaister, Professor of Mathematics and Mathematics Education, University of Reading. For services to Education.
- Professor Siân Meryl Griffiths, OBE, Deputy Chair, GambleAware and Chair, Global Health Committee, Public Health England. For voluntary and charitable services, particularly during Covid-19.
- Tessa Helen Griffiths, lately Director, Covid Response Measures, Department for Education. For services to Education and to the Covid-19 Response.
- Dr Graham Harold Gudgin, For services to Economic Development in Northern Ireland.
- Dr David Halpern, What Works National Adviser. For Public Service.
- George Richard Ian Howe (George Fenton), Composer. For services to Music.
- Professor Sharon Hutchinson, Professor of Epidemiology and Population Health, Glasgow Caledonian University. For services to Public Health Research.
- Maria Teresa Jennings, Director, Regulatory Compliance, People and Northern Ireland, Food Standards Agency. For services to Public Health.
- Patrick Anthony Jennings, OBE, For services to Association Football and to Charity.
- Alexandra Claire Rhian Auterson Jones, Director, Science, Research and Innovation, Department for Business, Energy and Industrial Strategy. For services to Research and Innovation.
- Suzanne Kantor, Director, Personal Tax, Welfare and Pensions, H.M. Revenue and Customs. For Public Service.
- Peter Jon Kellner, Political Analyst and lately Chair, National Council for Voluntary Organisations. For Charitable Services.
- Peter William Kyle, OBE, lately Chair, Shakespeare Birthplace Trust. For services to Cultural Heritage.
- Andrea Helen Ledward, Director, International Biodiversity and Climate, Department for Environment, Food and Rural Affairs. For services to the Environment.
- Professor Janet Mary Lord, Professor of Immune Cell Biology and Director, MRC-Versus Arthritis Centre for Musculoskeletal Ageing Research, University of Birmingham. For services to Older People.
- Sarah Maclean, lately Director, Covid Response Measures, Department for Education. For services to Education and to the Covid-19 Response.
- John Stephen Mahon, lately Adviser, Covid Corporate Credit Committee. For services to Financial Services during Covid-19.
- Peter Joseph McGhee, Principal, St John Rigby Sixth Form College, Greater Manchester. For services to Further Education.
- Catherine Sidony McGuinness, lately Chair of the Policy and Resources Committee, City of London Corporation. For services to the Financial Sector and to Educational Inclusion.
- Andrea Frances Williams-McKenzie, lately Deputy Director, HR Operations, London Region, H.M. Courts and Tribunals Service. For Public Service.
- Dr Ramesh Dulichandbhai Mehta, OBE, President, British Association of Physicians of Indian Origin. For services to Equality, Diversity and Inclusion.
- Neil Francis Jeremy, The Lord Mendoza, Commissioner for Culture. For services to Arts and to Culture.
- Professor Linda Joyce Merrick, Principal, Royal Northern College of Music. For services to Music in Higher Education.
- Elinor Mitchell, Director of Economy, Scottish Government. For Public Service during Covid-19.
- Louise Catherine Mitchell, Chief Executive, Bristol Music Trust. For services to the Arts in Bristol.
- Dr Frances Mary Morris, Director, Tate Modern. For services to the Arts.
- Professor David Mosey, lately Director, Centre of Construction Law and Dispute Resolution, Dickson Poon School of Law, King's College London. For services to the Construction Industry.
- Dr Yvette Alison Oade, lately Interim Regional Medical Director for North East and Yorkshire, NHS England and NHS Improvement. For services to Women in the NHS.
- John O'Brien, Inquiry Secretary, Independent Inquiry into Child Sexual Abuse. For services to Child Protection.
- Jacqueline Ann Old, lately Director, Children's and Adult Services, North Tyneside Council. For services to the community in North Tyneside.
- Sarah Jane Pickup, OBE, Deputy Chief Executive, Local Government Association. For services to Social Care.
- Professor Robert Joseph Plomin, FBA, Professor of Behavioural Genetics, King's College London. For services to Scientific Research.
- Samuel David Pollock, OBE, For Public Service in Northern Ireland.
- Veronica Margaret Povey, Finance Director, Ministry of Defence. For services to Public Finance and to Volunteering.
- Ann Christina Radmore, lately Regional Director for East of England, NHS England and NHS Improvement. For services to the NHS.
- Dr Mary Elizabeth Booth Ramsay, Director of Public Health Programmes, UK Health Security Agency. For services to Public Health.
- Nageshwara Dwarampudi Reddy, Portfolio Director, Labour Market and Plan for Jobs, Department for Work and Pensions. For Public Service.
- James Andrew Reed, Chairman, Reed Group. For services to Business and to Charity.
- Ian Alexander Reid, Chief Executive Officer, Organising Committee, 2022 Commonwealth Games. For services to Sport.
- Professor Colin Bryan Riordan, President and Vice-Chancellor, Cardiff University. For services to Higher Education.
- Beverley Rose Robinson, OBE, Principal and Chief Executive, Blackpool and The Fylde College. For services to Further Education.
- Anthony George Edward Rowe, OBE, Chair and Chief Executive, Exeter Chiefs. For services to Rugby Union Football and to the community in Exeter, Devon.
- Francis Roy, For Political and Public Service.
- Eve Coulter Salomon, Chair, Horniman Museum and Gardens. For services to the Arts and Heritage.
- Dr Marcus Andrew Samuel, lately Chief Executive, North Sea Transition Authority. For services to the Energy Sector.
- Dr Gurdial Singh Sanghera, Founder and Chief Executive Officer, Oxford Nanopore Technologies plc. For services to the Technology Sector.
- Jatinder Kumar Sharma, OBE DL, Principal, Walsall College. For services to Further Education.
- John Brian Harold Christopher Anthony Singer, Director, Pantheon International plc. For services to Business, to the Arts and to Education.
- Jasvir Singh, OBE, Chair, City Sikhs. For services to Charity, to Faith Communities and Social Cohesion.
- Professor Keshav Singhal, MBE, For services to Medicine and to the community in Wales.
- Tanya Margaret Anne Steele, Chief Executive, WWF UK. For services to Wildlife and to the Environment.
- The Right Honourable Andrew George Stephenson, MP, Member of Parliament for Pendle and lately Chair, Conservative Party. For Political and Public Service.
- Professor Christopher Brian Stringer, FRSE, Research Leader, Human Evolution, Natural History Museum. For services to the Understanding of Human Evolution.
- Professor Deborah Ann Sturdy, OBE, Chief Nurse for Adult Social Care, Department for Health and Social Care. For services to Social Care.
- Paula Sussex, Chief Executive, Student Loans Company. For services to Higher Education.
- Robert Tarn, Chief Executive Officer, Northern Education Trust. For services to Education.
- The Reverend Canon John Hartley Tattersall, LVO, Non-Executive Chairman, UK Asset Resolution. For services to the Financial Sector.
- Paul David Taylor, FREng, lately Science and Technology Adviser, Ministry of Defence. For Public Service.
- Joanna Hilary Todd, Founder and Chief Executive Officer, Respect. For services to Victims of Domestic Abuse.
- Lesley Elizabeth Travill (Lesley Watts), Chief Executive, Chelsea and Westminster Hospital NHS Foundation Trust. For services to the NHS.
- Lea Sarah Trussler (Lea Paterson), lately Executive Director, People and Culture, Bank of England. For services to the Economy.
- Simon Phillip Tse, Chief Executive, Crown Commercial Service. For services to the Public Sector and to Race Equality.
- Dr Fiona Philippa Tudor, lately Clerk of Committees, House of Lords. For services to Parliament.
- Nicholas Vetch, Co-founder, Big Yellow Self Storage Company. For services to Refugees.
- Claire Lois Whitaker, OBE, Member, Culture Recovery Board. For services to the Arts and to Culture.
- Gillian Wilmot, Chairman, Zoo Digital. For services to Business, to Entrepreneurship and to the prevention of Problem Gambling.
- Professor Gillian Susan Wright, MBE FRSE, Director, UK Astronomy Technology Centre, Edinburgh. For services to Astronomy through International Missions.
- Dr Linda Yi-Chuang Yueh, Fellow in Economics, St. Edmund Hall, University of Oxford and Adjunct Professor of Economics, London Business School. For services to Economics.

==== Officer of the Order of the British Empire (OBE) ====
Military

- Commodore Donald Ernest Frederick Crosbie
- Captain Glyn Owen
- Captain Peter Michael Viney
- Captain Thomas Henry Weaver
- Commander John Michael George Dineen
- Commander Andrew Maurice Pariser
- Colonel Andrew James Charles Geary
- Lieutenant Colonel (now Acting Colonel) James Edwin Ashworth, The Yorkshire Regiment
- Lieutenant Colonel Patrick James Farrell, Royal Regiment of Artillery
- Lieutenant Colonel James Anthony Faux, The Rifles
- Lieutenant Colonel Jeyasangar Jeyanathan, Royal Army Medical Corps
- Lieutenant Colonel Rachel Joanna Limbrey, Royal Corps of Signals
- Lieutenant Colonel Peter Michael Skinsley, The Royal Logistic Corps
- Lieutenant Colonel Colin Wood, MBE, The Parachute Regiment
- The Reverend Ian Brown
- Group Captain Neil James Critchley
- Group Captain Louise Ann Henton
- Group Captain Peter Martin Saul
- Group Captain Daniel Paul Snape
- Wing Commander Sandra Corrie Byford
- Wing Commander Adrian Paul Hobson

Civil

- Professor William Dominic Joshua Abrams, FBA, Professor of Social Psychology, University of Kent. For services to Social Sciences.
- Daniel James Abramson, Head Teacher, King's College London Mathematics School, London Borough of Lambeth. For services to Education.
- Peter Michael Aiers, lately Chief Executive, Churches Conservation Trust. For services to Heritage.
- Usman Ali, lately Chair, Black Workers' Committee, Scottish Trades Union Congress. For services to Equality and Cohesion in Scotland.
- Afshin Amirahmadi, Managing Director, Arla Foods UK. For services to the Dairy Industry.
- Jonathan Harry Samuel Arkush, President, Memorial Foundation for Jewish Culture, Co-Chair, Milah UK and lately President, The Board of Deputies of British Jews and Milah UK. For services to Faith and to Integration.
- Andrew John Colborne-Baber, Senior Volunteer, Conservative Party. For Political Service.
- Nicola Louise Bailey, For services to Healthcare in Northern Ireland.
- Brian Baird, lately Board Member, Invest NI. For services to Economic Development in Northern Ireland.
- Dr Nina Crampton Baker, DL, For services to the History of Women in Engineering.
- Jonathan Ball, Chief Executive, The Royal Marines Association and The Royal Marines Charity. For services to the Royal Marines.
- Paul Barber, Deputy Chair and Chief Executive, Brighton and Hove Albion Football Club. For services to Association Football.
- Jane Mary Bass, Chief Executive Officer, Connected Learning Multi Academy Trust. For services to Education.
- Philip James Manning Batty, Director of Ceremonies, Cultural Programmes and Queen's Baton Relay, 2022 Commonwealth Games. For services to Sport and to Culture.
- William Alan Beckett, Chairman, International Trade Forum. For services to Manufacturing and to Exports.
- Rashid Begum, lately Acting Deputy Director, Home Office. For Public Service.
- Helen Clare Belcher, Trustee, Trans Media Watch, Director, Transactual and Councillor, Wiltshire Council. For services to the Transgender Community.
- Marcus David John Bell, Director of Equalities, Cabinet Office. For Public Service.
- Michael Thomas Bell, Executive Director, Northern Ireland Food and Drink Association Ltd. For services to the Food and Drink Industry and to the Economy in Northern Ireland.
- Felicity Catherine Jane Bennée, Deputy Director and Co-Chair, Welsh Technical Advisory Group, Welsh Government. For Public Service.
- Stuart Roy Bennett, Refugee Resettlement Lead, Universal Credit Complex Needs, Department for Work and Pensions. For Public Service.
- Smajo Beso, Educator, Holocaust Memorial Day Trust. For services to Genocide Education and Commemoration.
- Julian Piers Bird, lately Chief Executive, Society of London Theatre and UK Theatre. For services to Theatre.
- Professor Adam Boddison, Association for Project Management Chief Executive Officer, NASEN and Chair, Whole School SEND. For services to Children and Young People with Special Educational Needs.
- Fiona Jane Boulton, Headteacher, Guildford High School. For services to Education.
- Elaine Jean Boyd, Director, Audit Quality and Appointments, Audit Scotland. For Public and Charitable Services.
- Joseph Patrick Breen, lately Senior Scientific Officer, Department for Agriculture, Environment and Rural Affairs, Northern Ireland Executive. For services to Marine Science and to Environmental Protection.
- YolanDa Brown, DL, For services to Music, Music Education and to Broadcasting.
- Victoria Browning, lately Chief Executive Officer, Association of Chief Executives of Voluntary Organisations. For services to the Charity Sector.
- Jeremy Paul Alan Burnie, Head of Compliance, British Toy and Hobby Association. For services to Business and to Consumers.
- Susie Janet Burrage, Managing Director, Recycled Products Ltd. For services to Recycling and to the Environment.
- Professor Francis Anthony Casey, Consultant Paediatric Cardiologist. For services to Healthcare in Northern Ireland.
- Professor Nishi Chaturvedi, Professor of Clinical Epidemiology and Director, Lifelong Health and Ageing Unit, University College London. For services to Medical Research.
- Victor James Boyd Chestnutt, lately President, Ulster Farmers' Union. For services to Agriculture.
- John Gerard Averell Spencer Churchill, Co-founder and Chief Executive Officer, Scanning Pens Ltd. For services to International Trade and to the Dyslexia and Special Educational Needs and Disabilities Community.
- Elaine Margaret Clarke, Founder, Baa Bar, Liverpool. For services to Hospitality.
- Lynn Elaine Cleal, Chair, St John Scotland Public Access Defibrillator Scheme. For Voluntary Service to the community in Scotland.
- Russell Andrew Foster Corn, Chair of Trustees, The Special Boat Service Association. For Charitable Service.
- Jocelyn Harry Croft, Chief Executive Officer, UKinbound. For services to the Tourism Industry.
- John Cross, Chair, Bovine TB Partnership for England. For services to the Livestock Industry.
- Margaret Dabbs, Founder, Margaret Dabbs Foot Clinics. For services to Business and to Podiatry.
- Maruska Greenwood-Dalecki, lately Chief Executive Officer, LGBT Health and Wellbeing. For services to Equality.
- Jo-Anne Daniels, Director, Test, Trace and Protect Service, Wales. For services to Public Health and Education in Wales.
- Jennet Ruth Davis, MBE, lately Senior Adviser, COP26 Unit, Cabinet Office. For Public Service.
- Carolyn Dawson, Chief Executive Officer, Founders Forum. For services to London Tech Week and to Technology and Digital Media.
- Celia Elaine Dawson, Headteacher, Cricket Green School, London Borough of Merton. For services to Children and Young People with Special Educational Needs.
- Anne Margaret Diamond, Campaigner and Fundraiser. For services to Public Health and to Charity.
- Brendan Sweeney Dick, Executive Adviser and lately Chair, Openreach Board in Scotland. For services to Telecommunications and to Business in Scotland.
- Michael William Dickson, Chief Executive, Shetland and Orkney Islands NHS Board. For services to Healthcare during Covid-19.
- Stephen Docking, Chief Executive Officer, North West Academies Trust. For services to Education.
- Andrew Mark Van Doorn, Chief Executive, Housing Associations Charitable Trust. For services to Housing.
- Sarah Ann, Lady Dorfman, Philanthropist. For services to Ballet and Dance.
- Alan John Eisner, lately Chair, Maggie's. For services to Charitable Fundraising.
- Dr. Jennifer Elliott. For services to the Arts in Northern Ireland.
- Fiona Jane Ellis, Chief Executive Officer, Survivors in Transition. For services to Survivors of Childhood Sexual Abuse.
- Dr Bridget Anne Emmett, Head of Soils and Land Use, UK Centre for Ecology and Hydrology. For services to Soil and Ecosystem Science.
- Robert John Emlyn Evans, Member, Surrey County Council. For Public and Political Service.
- Timothy George Eyles, Chair, Royal Society of Arts. For services to the Arts.
- Robin Michael Faccenda, lately Chairman, Faccenda Investments. For services to the UK Poultry Industry and to Education.
- Helen Clare Louise Fairfoul, lately Chief Executive, Universities and Colleges Employers Association Board and Non-Executive Board Member, Northumbria University. For services to Higher Education.
- Christine Diane Farrugia, Chief of Staff to Commissioners, Department for Levelling Up, Housing and Communities. For Public Service.
- Katherine Ann Faulkner, Chair, The Home Buying and Selling Group. For services to the Home Moving Industry.
- Alexander Ferguson, Team Leader, Ministry of Defence. For services to Defence.
- Philip Terence Fiander, For voluntary and charitable services in Wales.
- Ralph Graham Findlay, Chair, C&C Group plc. For services to the Hospitality Sector.
- Iain Murray Forbes, For services to Business and to the Third Sector in Scotland.
- Professor Richard Alan Fortey, FRS, Senior Palaeontologist, Natural History Museum. For services to Palaeontology and Geology.
- James Richard John Furse, lately Non-Executive Director, National Savings and Investments. For Public Service.
- Helen Anne Gaunt, lately Specialist Prosecutor, Crown Prosecution Service, Yorkshire and Humberside. For services to Law and Order.
- Karen Tracy Rhodes-German, Head of Payment Strategy, H.M. Revenue and Customs. For Public Service.
- Professor Peter Ghazal, Sêr Cymru II Professor of Systems Medicine, Cardiff University. For services to Systems Immunology.
- James Bradley Gilbert, lately Deputy Director, Scottish Government. For services to Housing.
- Hadley Gill, Senior Officer, National Crime Agency. For services to Law Enforcement and to Diversity.
- Ravinder Gill, Executive Chair and Founder, LCA London Ltd. For services to Higher Education.
- Matthew Cardover Gordon, Chief Executive Officer, Spectra First. For services to Vulnerable Young People.
- Helen Goulden, Chief Executive Officer, The Young Foundation. For services to the Development of Sustainable Communities.
- Stephen Graham, Actor. For services to Drama.
- Helen Grant, MP, Member of Parliament for Maidstone and the Weald. For Political and Public Service.
- James Joshua Gray, Joint Managing Director, Gray and Adams Holdings Ltd. For services to Industry and to the community in Fraserburgh.
- Peter Gray, Joint Managing Director, Gray and Adams Holdings Ltd. For services to Industry and to the community in Fraserburgh.
- Ian Richard Green, Chief Executive, Terrence Higgins Trust. For services to Charity and to Public Health.
- Dr Rosemary Christine Green (Rosemary Loftus), lately Chief Medical Officer, Macmillan. For services to People with Cancer.
- Puneet Gupta, Co-Founder and Chief Executive Officer, PG Paper. For services to Business, to Charity and to the community in Scotland.
- Jennifer Anne Hall, Director of Nursing and Clinical Delivery, Covid-19 Vaccination Programme, NHS England and NHS Improvement. For services to the NHS, particularly during Covid-19.
- Simon David Hankins, Head of Operations, Parliamentary Security Department. For services to Parliament.
- Asrar Ul-Haq, DL, For services to the community in Greater Manchester.
- Mark Richard Harbord, Director of Cyber Security, Parliamentary Digital Service. For services to Parliament.
- Ian John Hares, lately Chief Executive Officer, UK Asset Resolution. For services to the Financial Services Sector.
- David Michael Harewood, MBE, Actor and Broadcaster. For services to Drama and to Charity.
- Professor Ewen Munro Harrison, Professor of Surgery and Data Science, University of Edinburgh. For services to the Covid-19 Response.
- Wendy Elizabeth Haxell, Technical Official, UK Athletics. For services to Athletics and to the community in Hampshire.
- Dr Ross Hemingway, Civilian Medical Practitioner, Commando Training Centre Royal Marines. For services to the Royal Marines.
- Rachel Hick, Deputy Head, Finance Team, Army Headquarters, Ministry of Defence. For services to Defence.
- Susan Julie Higginson, Principal and Chief Executive, Wirral Metropolitan College, Birkenhead, Merseyside. For services to Further Education.
- Patricia Anne Higson (Paddy Higson), Patron and lately Chief Executive Officer, Glasgow Media Access Centre (GMAC Film). For services to the Film and Television Industry and to Diversity and Inclusion in Film and Television.
- Andrew Hill, Chief Executive, Hill Partnerships Ltd. For services to Affordable Housing.
- Diane Patricia Hill, Employment Tribunal Lay Panel Member, Midlands West. For services to the Administration of Justice.
- Dr. Vivian Ivor Hinchcliffe, Chair and Managing Trustee, St. Jude Foundation. For services to Children and Young People with Special Educational Needs.
- Peter James Hines, Headteacher, Perryfields Primary Pupil Referral Unit, Worcester. For services to Education.
- Catherine Elizabeth Hinwood, Lead for Domestic Abuse and Sexual Violence, NHS England and lately Deputy Director, Victim and Witness Policy, Policy and Strategy Group, Ministry of Justice. For Public Service.
- Geoffrey Mark Hodgson, DL, Chair, Blyth Harbour Commission. For services to the UK Ports Sector and to the Economy in North East England.
- Paula Ann Holland, Deputy Director, Work and Health Decision Making, Department for Work and Pensions. For Public Service.
- Alaric Guy Code Horridge, Chief Executive, Cadet Vocational Qualification Organisation. For services to Further Education.
- Dr Richard Charles Horton, Editor-in-Chief, The Lancet. For services to Health and Medical Journalism.
- Karen Anne Howell, Chief Executive, Wirral Community Health and Care NHS Foundation Trust. For services to Health Care.
- Paula Jane Hudgell, Foster Carer, Kent County Council. For services to Children.
- Emily Bronwen Hunt, Independent Adviser to the Rape Review. For services to Victims of Sexual Violence.
- Sophie Louise Ingle, Captain, Wales Women's National Football Team. For services to Association Football.
- Stephen Leonard Ingledew, Executive Chair, Fintech Scotland. For services to the Financial Technology Sector.
- Mouhssin Ismail, lately Principal, Newham Collegiate Sixth Form Centre, London Borough of Newham. For services to Education.
- Saika Jabeen, Assistant Chief Officer, Nottinghamshire Probation Service. For Public Service.
- Elizabeth Anne Jackson, Head of Space Exploration, UK Space Agency. For services to the Space Sector.
- Sharon Kaur Jandu, Director, Yorkshire Asian Business Association. For services to International Trade.
- Dr Harren Jhoti, FRS, Founder, President and Chief Executive Officer, Astex Pharmaceuticals. For services to Cancer Research and to Drug Discovery.
- Philip Jones (Philip Edgar-Jones), Director, Sky Arts and Entertainment. For services to the Arts and to Television.
- Professor Richard Graham Jones, Science Fellow, Applied International Development, Met Office. For services to Climate Science.
- Beverley Karen Gower-Jones, Founder and Chief Executive Officer, Carbon Limiting Technologies. For services to Net Zero Innovation.
- David Palmer-Jones, lately Chief Executive Officer, Suez Recycling and Recovery. For services to Recycling.
- Karen Joy, Head Teacher, Abbey Court Community Special Foundation School, Medway, Kent. For services to Children and Young People with Severe, Profound and Multiple Learning Difficulties.
- Dr Krishna Rohan Kandiah, Founder, The Sanctuary Foundation. For services to Refugee Integration.
- Michael Benjamin Karp, Trustee, Holocaust Educational Trust. For services to Holocaust Education and Remembrance.
- Carol Margaret Kefford, lately Chief Nurse and Clinical Director, Nuffield Health. For services to Nursing.
- Fukhera Khalid, Managing Director, Elbrook Cash and Carry. For services to Business, to Charity and to the community in North London.
- Professor Colin Craig Kidd, Professor of History, University of St Andrews. For services to History, to Culture and to Politics.
- Vanessa Kingori, MBE, Chief Business Officer, Condé Nast Britain and Publishing Director, British Vogue. For services to the Media Industry.
- Dr Sandra Diane Knapp, FRS, Botanist and Individual Merit Researcher, Natural History Museum. For services to Botany and the Public Understanding of Science.
- David Kevin Lawes, Temporary Commander, City of London Police. For services to Policing.
- Colin John Leat, Portfolio Manager, Digital Communications, Defence Equipment and Support, Ministry of Defence. For services to Defence.
- Peter Leathem, Chief Executive Officer, Phonographic Performance Ltd. For services to the Music Industry.
- Susan Andrea Lee (Sue Cipin), Chief Executive Officer, Jewish Deaf Association. For services to Charity and to People with Hearing and Visual Impairments.
- Benjamin Lindsay, Chief Executive Officer, Power the Fight. For services to the community in South East London.
- Samuel Robert Littlejohns, Senior Lawyer, Ministry of Defence Legal Advisers, Government Legal Department. For services to the Law.
- Michael Norman Lloyd, Chief Executive, Stoke-on-Trent Classics. For services to Classical Music.
- Alison Lyons. For services to International Trade and to Charity.
- Fiona Jane Spargo-Mabbs, Founder and Director, The Daniel Spargo-Mabbs Foundation. For services to Young People.
- Tansy Main, Head of the Chief Medical Officer's Taskforce on Rape and Sexual Assault Unit, Scottish Government. For services to Victims in Scotland.
- Professor Joanne Rycroft-Malone, lately Programme Director, Health Services and Delivery Programme, National Institute for Health Research. For services to Health and Social Care Research.
- Professor Kantilal Vardichand Mardia, Senior Research Professor, Leeds University, For services to Statistical Science.
- Adam James Matthews, Head, International, Stream, Centre for Digital Built Britain. For services to Export Growth.
- Carol Marie McCann, lately Principal, St Dominic's Grammar School, Belfast. For services to Education.
- Steven McCourt, Head of Reducing Reoffending, Resettlement and Rehabilitation, Department of Justice, Northern Ireland Executive. For Public Service.
- Christopher William McGarry, Head of Information Services, Defence Electronics Components Agency. For Public Service.
- Elaine Ann McGillivray, Tax Specialist, H.M. Revenue and Customs. For Public Service.
- Jonathan Peter Mearns, Counter Terrorism Police Liaison Officer, Metropolitan Police Service. For services to International Policing.
- Hitan Mehta, Executive Director, British Asian Trust. For services to the British Asian Community.
- Simon Mellor, Deputy Chief Executive, Arts and Museums, Arts Council England. For services to the Arts.
- Ian Roland Metcalfe, lately Chair, Commonwealth Games England. For services to Sport.
- John Middleton, Team Leader, Ministry of Defence. For services to Defence.
- Professor Graeme Milligan, FRSE, Gardiner Chair of Biochemistry and Deputy Head, College of Medical, Veterinary and Life Sciences, University of Glasgow. For services to Biomedical Research and to Industry.
- John Gordon Milligan, For services to Business and Human Resource Management in Northern Ireland.
- Ann Margaret Millington, QFSM, Chief Executive, Kent Fire and Rescue Service. For services to Fire and Rescue.
- Gotz Mohindra, Senior Volunteer, Conservative Party. For Political Service.
- Mary Montgomery, Principal, Belfast Boys' Model. For services to Education.
- Professor Terry Moore, Emeritus Professor, University of Nottingham. For services to Satellite Navigation.
- Maureen Colquhoun Morris, lately Co-Chair, National Network of Parent Carer Forums. For services to Parent Carers of Children and Young People with Special Educational Needs and Disabilities.
- Sandra Needham, DL, Chief Executive, West and North Yorkshire Chamber of Commerce. For services to Business and to the Economy.
- Geoffrey Michael Newton, lately Vice-Chair, British Paralympic Association. For services to Sport.
- Tracy Lee Nicholls, Chief Executive, College of Paramedics. For services to the Paramedic Profession.
- Angela Margaret Noon, lately Chair, Skills and Productivity Board. For services to Further Education.
- Robert O'Connor, Deputy Director, Disability Services, Department for Work and Pensions. For Public Service.
- Dr Ann Olivarius, Lawyer. For services to Justice and to Women and Equality.
- Joanne Elizabeth Oliver, Head of Approved Premises, H.M. Prison and Probation Service. For Public Service.
- Kieran Jude Osborne, Chair of Trustees, Impact Multi Academy Trust, London. For services to Education.
- Anthony John Predrotti, Deputy Director, Central Grants and Loans Team, Department for Business, Energy and Industrial Strategy. For services to Business.
- Katrina Louise Phillips, Chief Executive, Child Accident Prevention Trust. For services to Child Safety.
- Dr Jane Karen Townson Philpott, Chief Executive Officer, Home Care Association. For services to Domiciliary Care, particularly during Covid-19.
- Professor Kate Elizabeth Pickett, Professor of Epidemiology, University of York. For services to Societal Equality.
- Susan Pittock, Chief Executive Officer, Remit Training. For services to Education and Skills.
- Susan Pollack, MBE, For services to Holocaust Education and Awareness.
- Dr Catherine Eve Poole. For services to Education and to Gender Equality.
- Jane Louise Portas, Financial Services Professional and Educator. For services to Business and to Equality.
- Anthony John Christopher Poulter, Non-Executive Director, Department for Transport. For services to the Transport Industry.
- Professor Mohamed Pourkashanian, Managing Director, Energy Innovation Centre, University of Sheffield. For services to Net Zero Research and to Innovation.
- Professor, Geoffrey David Price, lately Vice-Provost, Research, Innovation and Global Engagement, University College London. For services to Science and to Research.
- Dr Jeffery Nii Adjei Tawiah Quaye, National Director of Education and Standards, Aspirations Academies Trust. For services to Education.
- Sheikh Aliur Rahman, Chief Executive Officer, London Tea Exchange. For services to the Tea Industry and to Young People.
- Andrew Read, Deputy Director, People Services, Crown Prosecution Service. For Public Service.
- Jane Alison Read, Clinical Framework Progression Lead, Directorate of Security, H.M. Prison and Probation Service. For Public Service.
- Neil Renton, Team Leader, Ministry of Defence. For services to Defence.
- Professor Kimberley Griffith Reynolds, Author and Professor of Children's Literature, Newcastle University. For services to Literature.
- Trevor Dale Robinson, lately Principal, Lurgan College, County Armagh. For services to Education.
- Andrew John Rose, Director, The National Lottery Community Fund Wales. For services to Civil Society.
- Nicole Sapstead, lately Chief Executive Officer, UK Anti-Doping. For services to Sport.
- James Patrick Hepburne Scott, Director, Forest Carbon. For services to Forestry and to the Environment in Scotland.
- Riaz Shah, Founder and Chair of Trustees, One Degree Academy. For services to Education.
- Professor Sunil Shaunak, Emeritus Professor of Infectious Diseases, Imperial College London. For services to Infectious Diseases and Drug Discovery.
- Justin David Elliott Byam Shaw, Founder, The Felix Project. For services to the community in London.
- Richard Edward Sheriff, Chief Executive Officer, Red Kite Learning Trust. For services to Education.
- Remzije Sherifi. For services to Refugee Integration in Glasgow.
- Mahanta Bahadur Shrestha, Philanthropist. For services to the community in the London Borough of Ealing and to the Nepalese Community.
- Nolan Andrew Smith, Director of Resources and Finance, Office for Students. For services to Higher Education.
- Dr Philip Frank Souter, Senior Director, Research and Development, Procter and Gamble. For services to Medical Research.
- Catherine Victoria Spencer, Chief Executive Officer, The Seafarers Charity. For services to Seafarers.
- Dr John Edmund Stannard, Legal Academic, Queen's University Belfast. For services to Legal Education.
- Floyd Steadman. For services to Rugby Union Football, to Education and to Charity.
- Carolyn Stidston, Founder, CS Nursery Schools Ltd. For services to Education.
- Sian Isobel Stockham, Member for Wales, National Executive Council, UNISON. For Political and Public Service.
- Andrea Street, Deputy Director, Welsh Government. For services to Health and Social Care in Wales.
- John Aleck Suchet. For services to Journalism and to Charity.
- David Sutherland, Illustrator, The Beano. For services to Illustration.
- Toby Jonathan Sutton, Co-founder and Chief Operating Officer, Scanning Pens Ltd. For services to International Trade and to the Dyslexia and Special Educational Needs and Disabilities Community.
- Janet Diana Swadling, lately Chief Executive, Institute for Agriculture and Horticulture. For services to Farming and to Education.
- Alan Tallentire, lately Prison Group Director, Tees and Wear Prison Group. For Public Service.
- Gareth Tame, Expert Meteorologist, Met Office. For services to Forensic Meteorology.
- Simon Taylor, Chief Executive Officer, Three Rivers Trust. For services to Education.
- Susan Fajana-Thomas, Founder, SFT Foundation Trust. For services to Local Government and to Gender Equality.
- Professor Geoffrey Till, Professor Emeritus, King's College London and US Naval War College. For services to Defence.
- Charles Mortimer Tracy, lately Head of Education, Institute of Physics. For services to Education.
- Natasha Tulloch (Natasha Porter), Chief Executive Officer and Founder, Unlocked Graduates Charity. For services to H.M. Prison and Probation Service.
- Christan Upton, Headteacher, Tarleton Community Primary School, Preston, Lancashire. For services to Education.
- Dr Jenny Vaughan, Consultant Neurologist, London North West University Healthcare NHS Trust. For services to Healthcare.
- Professor Timothy Ross Vorley, Pro Vice-Chancellor and Dean, Oxford Brookes Business School. For services to Enterprise, to Entrepreneurship and to Innovation.
- Elinor Joan Wakefield, lately Deputy COP26 Envoy, COP26 Unit, Cabinet Office. For Public Service.
- Deborah Ann Walls, lately Chief Executive Officer, Coombe Academy Trust, Surrey. For services to Education.
- Deborah Elizabeth Watters, Co-Director, Northern Ireland Alternative. For Public Service.
- Professor Jonathan Hugh Waxman, Founder and Life President, Prostate Cancer UK. For services to Prostate Cancer Awareness and Treatment.
- Helen Webb, lately Chief People and Services Officer, Co-operative Society. For services to Equality, Inclusion and Wellbeing.
- The Right Rev. Dr. Derek Anthony Webley, MBE DL, Co-Chair, Windrush Cross Government Working Group. For services to the Windrush Generation.
- Dr Andrew Robert Welch, Medical Director, The Newcastle upon Tyne Hospitals NHS Foundation Trust. For services to Healthcare and Patients in North East England.
- Jonathan William Welfare, Chair, Gingerbread and Founder, Turn2Us. For services to Charity and to Disadvantaged People.
- Fiona Ann White, lately Deputy Director, Train Strategy and Operations, Department for Transport. For Public Service.
- Dr Liam Simon Whitfield, Deputy Director, Covid-19 SAGE Advice and Evidence, Government Office for Science. For services to Science and to Resilience in Government.
- Mark Wild, lately Chief Executive Officer, Crossrail Ltd. For services to Public Transport.
- Michael Duncan Williams, Treasurer, World Rowing and Board Member, British Rowing. For services to Rowing.
- Sara Louise Gilroy Williams, Chief Executive, Staffordshire Chambers of Commerce and Industry Ltd. For services to the community in Staffordshire.
- Leah Cathrine Williamson. For services to Association Football.
- Alison Wilson, lately Deputy Director, Vulnerable Children Unit, Department for Education. For Public Service.
- Benjamin Woods, Head of Capital Projects, Commonwealth Games. For Public Service.
- Marie van der Zyl, President, The Board of Deputies of British Jews. For services to Faith and to Integration.

==== Member of the Order of the British Empire (MBE) ====
Military

- Lieutenant Commander Oliver Gary Brown
- Lieutenant Commander Jennifer Floyd
- Lieutenant Henry Theodore Mainstone
- Chief Petty Officer Logistician (Writer) Miriam Charlton
- Chief Petty Officer Engineering Technician (Communications and Information Systems) Philip Geoffrey Richard Hodgson
- Chief Petty Officer Logistician (Writer) Janine Candice Potts
- Chief Petty Officer Aircrewman Mark Steven Alan Spencer
- Chief Petty Officer Engineering Technician (Communications and Information Systems) Nicola Wade
- Leading Logistician (Writer) Tommy Andrew Russell Horrell
- Major Angus Edward Berger, Royal Marines
- Lieutenant Colonel Guy Philip Chambers, The Rifles, Army Reserve
- Lieutenant Colonel Billy Dilkes, The Royal Logistic Corps
- Lieutenant Colonel Jeremy Francis Giles, The Royal Regiment of Scotland
- Lieutenant Colonel Dominic Paul Lethbridge, Corps of Royal Electrical and Mechanical Engineers
- Lieutenant Colonel Toby Robin Moore, Army Air Corps
- Lieutenant Colonel Michael James Sharp, Royal Regiment of Artillery
- Lieutenant Colonel Bede Strong, VR, Royal Tank Regiment, Army Reserve
- Lieutenant Colonel Stephen John Woodings, Corps of Royal Engineers
- Major Robert McAllister Crawford, The Royal Logistic Corps
- Major Peter Thomas Arthur Dobinson, Corps of Royal Engineers
- Major Richard Paul Fowles, Adjutant General's Corps (Educational and Training Services Branch)
- Major Thomas Lloyd-Jukes, Royal Tank Regiment
- Major William Clifford McAuley, The Royal Regiment of Scotland
- Major Philip Nicholas Mooney, Royal Regiment of Artillery
- Major Sophie Jane Spencer-Small, The Royal Logistic Corps
- Major Calvin James Smith, The Parachute Regiment
- Major Philip John Sweeney, The Duke of Lancaster's Regiment
- Major David Robert Thatcher, Royal Regiment of Artillery
- Captain Alexander William Geyton Edmund, The Royal Regiment of Fusiliers
- Captain George Herbert Samuel Gibson, Corps of Royal Engineers
- Captain Tristram Gary Hough, Corps of Royal Engineers
- Captain (now Acting Major) Daljinder Singh Virdee, Royal Army Medical Corps, Army Reserve
- Warrant Officer Class 1 Daniel James Miller, Royal Corps of Signals
- Warrant Officer Class 1 Carl John Ryan, Adjutant General's Corps (Staff and Personnel Support Branch)
- Warrant Officer Class 2 Andrew James Chattaway, Intelligence Corps
- Warrant Officer Class 2 Waylon Christopher Issac Jang, Adjutant General's Corps (Staff and Personnel Support Branch)
- Warrant Officer Class 2 Godfrey Boyd Morris, Royal Regiment of Artillery
- Warrant Officer Class 2 Abimbola Felix Oluwasona, The Royal Logistic Corps
- Staff Sergeant Shane Alan Thomas Smith, Royal Corps of Signals
- Sergeant Jade Diane Baptie, Adjutant General's Corps (Staff and Personnel Support Branch)
- Sergeant David Steven, The Royal Dragoon Guards
- Sergeant Alastair Lee Smith, The Princess of Wales's Royal Regiment/The Ranger Regiment
- Corporal Hollie Haviland Davis, Royal Army Medical Corps
- Corporal Pardeep Kaur, The Royal Logistic Corps
- Corporal Kelvin Jordan Zingano, Adjutant General's Corps (Staff and Personnel Support Branch)
- Lance Corporal (now Acting Corporal) Richard Alexander Milburn, Intelligence Corps, Army Reserve
- Wing Commander Travis Arron Stone
- Squadron Leader Nicholas Mark Brook
- Squadron Leader Andrea Helen Dowds
- Squadron Leader Shelley Elizabeth Mackinnon
- Squadron Leader Mandy Heather Singleton
- Flight Lieutenant Charlotte Louise Dooley
- Flight Lieutenant Liam Kennedy Perry
- Warrant Officer Dean Richard Betts
- Warrant Officer Mac MacDonald
- Flight Sergeant (now Acting Master Aircrew) Matthew Bailey
- Flight Sergeant (now Acting Warrant Officer) Fiona Jane Phillips
- Flight Sergeant James Daniel Stewart
- Corporal Carl Anthony Houghton

Civil

- Mesba Ahmed, Founder and Chief Executive, London Tigers Charity. For services to the community in London.
- James Matthew William Alexander, Volunteer. For services to the Natural Environment.
- Syed Samad Ali, lately Teacher, Thornhill Academy, Sunderland, Tyne and Wear. For services to Education.
- Michael John Allen. For services to the community in Staffordshire.
- Antony Robson Jameson-Allen, Co-Founder, The Sporting Memories Foundation. For services to Dementia and Loneliness.
- John Oliver Alpass. For services to the community in Claygate, Surrey.
- Dr. Robert Anderson (Roy Anderson). For services to Science and Nature.
- Marc Arnold, Senior Research Analyst, Ministry of Defence. For services to Defence.
- Robert David John Austen. For services to the community in Wargrave, Berkshire.
- Judith Rachel Backus, Founder, Hidden Help. For services to Disadvantaged People in Cornwall.
- Sandra Hazel Bailie. For services to Bowls.
- Elizabeth Esther Mary Manning Baily. For services to Disability Advocacy and to Charity in West Sussex.
- Vivian Murray Bairstow. For Charitable Service.
- Jill Baker, lately Executive Headteacher, Eastbrook School, London Borough of Barking and Dagenham. For services to Education.
- Steven Andrew Baker, Geospatial Analyst, Defence Geographic Centre, Ministry of Defence. For Public Service.
- Dr Minal Bakhai (Minal Jayakumaar), General Practitioner and Director, Primary Care Transformation, NHS England. For services to General Practice, particularly during Covid-19.
- Charles Frederick Banks, Chair, North West Wheelchair Users Group and Secretary, Manchester United Disabled Supporters' Association. For services to People with Disabilities in Greater Manchester and North-West England.
- Pauline Anne Barker, Founder, Devon and Cornwall Wild Swimming. For services to Swimming in South West England.
- Stephen Michael Barry, Senior Executive Manager, Health Protection, Welsh Government. For services to Public Health in Wales.
- Deshne Barzangi, Team Leader, Ministry of Defence. For services to Defence.
- Barbara Pauline Beadman. For services to the Glass Industry.
- Jennifer Patricia Beattie. For services to Association Football and to Charity.
- Yanina Marie Beavers. For services to the community in Blackpool.
- Hannah Beecham, Founder and Chief Executive Officer, RED January. For services to Mental and Physical Health.
- Dr Peter Winston Belfield, lately Medical Director for Invited Service Reviews, Royal College of Physicians and lately Chair, St Gemma's Hospice. For services to Patient Safety and Care.
- Alan Bell, Founder, Executive Manager and Principal Instructor, The Scottish Centre for Personal Safety. For services to Vulnerable People.
- Claire Louise Bell, Flood and Coastal Risk Manager, Environment Agency. For services to Gender Equality in the Workplace.
- George Crawford Bell. For services to the Music Industry in Northern Ireland.
- Sharon Patricia Bell, Associate Service Manager, Department for Work and Pensions. For Public Service.
- Gwynneth Bellman, JP, Magistrate. For services to the Administration of Justice and to the community in Manchester.
- Catherine Elizabeth Belton, Author and Investigative Journalist. For services to Journalism.
- William John Gaston Bennett. For services to Radio and Television Broadcasting in Northern Ireland.
- Ursula Jula Hanna Bernstein (Yvonne Bernstein), Educator, Holocaust Memorial Day Trust. For services to Holocaust Education.
- Sandra Best, Volunteer and Trustee, Royal Ulster Constabulary George Cross Foundation. For Voluntary Service.
- Claire Helen Bevan, Chair, Audit Committee, Older People's Commissioner for Wales. For services to Nursing and Patient Care.
- David Charles Townshend Bickers, Co-Founder and Chief Executive, The Douglas Bader Foundation. For services to People with Disabilities.
- Paul Richard Bishop, Trainer, Sail Training International. For services to Young People.
- John Henry Bishton. For services to the Preservation and Heritage of the Historic Buildings in Bruton, Somerset.
- Elizabeth Blane, Laboratory Manager, University of Cambridge. For services to Pathogen Genome Sequencing.
- Stephen John Bleakley. For services to Libraries and to the community in Fermanagh, Omagh and Fivemiletown.
- Janet Kay Bogle, Actor and singer. For services to Music.
- Paul Campbell-Boross, Founder, The Pitch Doctor. For services to Business and to Social Mobility
- Elaine June Bousfield, Founder and lately Chief Executive, Kooth plc. For services to Children and Young People's Mental Health.
- Zoë Althea Bowden, lately Deputy Director and Head of Operations, ISIS Neutron and Muon Source. For services to Science.
- Patrick Liam Bradley, Chief Executive Officer, Swindon and Wiltshire Local Enterprise Partnership. For services to the Local Economy and to the community in Wiltshire.
- Susan Briggs, Strategic Development Officer, Aberdeenshire Council. For services to Community Learning and Development in North Scotland.
- Anisah Osman Britton, Founder, 23 Code Street. For services to Diversity in the Technology Sector.
- Lucia Roberta Tough Bronze. For services to Association Football.
- Denis Brophy, Lifeboat Operations Manager, Walmer Lifeboat Station, Royal National Lifeboat Institution. For services to Maritime Safety.
- Dr April Samantha Brown, Improvement Director, Intensive Support, NHS England. For services to the NHS and to Nursing.
- Emma Brown, Officer, National Crime Agency. For services to Law Enforcement.
- Pauline Mary Brown, Advanced Nurse Practitioner. For services to Healthcare in Scotland.
- Kenneth Sydney Brundle. For services to Business, to Economic Development and to the Charitable Sector in Northern Ireland.
- Simon Bullimore. For services to the community in Mistley, Essex.
- Denis Andrew Southerden Burn. For services to Charity and to the community in Bristol.
- Richard Burns, Customer Compliance Group, Customs and International Trade, H.M. Revenue and Customs. For Public Service.
- Dr Edson Burton, Writer, academic and curator. For services to the Arts and to the community in Bristol.
- Nicholas David Cady, Deputy Head of The Queen's Platinum Jubilee Team, Ceremonials, Department for Digital, Culture, Media and Sport. For Public Service.
- Gillian Macdonald Caldwell, Deputy Chief Commissioner of Scouts Scotland. For services to Scouting.
- Dr Anne Campbell, Reader, Queen's University Belfast. For services to Drug Policy and Practice.
- Ewa Cantrill, Officer, National Crime Agency. For services to Law Enforcement.
- Thomas Richard Chant, Chief Executive Officer, Society of Maritime Industries. For services to the Maritime Industry.
- Jade Bridget Clarke. For services to Netball.
- Stuart James Clarke, Festival Director, Leeds Digital Festival. For services to the Technology Sector.
- Robert Clarkson, Chief Systems Engineer, Serco, RAF Fylingdales. For services to Royal Air Force Operational Capability.
- Charlotte Rebecca Josephine Claughton, Senior Project Leader for the Refurbishment of the Elizabeth Tower. For services to Parliament.
- Elspeth Jane Clegg, Chief Nurse for London, NHS England and NHS Improvement. For services to Nursing and to the NHS.
- William James Coffey, Secretary to the Historical Institutional Abuse Redress Board. For Public Service.
- Christopher Graham Collins, Broadcaster and Comedian. For services to Entertainment.
- Phillip William Collins, lately Detective Inspector, Metropolitan Police Service. For services to Policing.
- Ellen Toni Convery. For services to Association Football.
- Michael Conway, Service Manager, Chesterfield Royal Hospital NHS Foundation Trust. For services to Anatomical Pathology Technology.
- Sarah Jane Cookson, Co-Founder, The Charlie and Carter Foundation. For Voluntary and Charitable Services.
- Martin Coombs, lately Finance Director, Chief Operating Officer and Senior Responsible Officer, Technology Sourcing Programme, Chief Digital Information Officer Group, H.M. Revenue and Customs. For Public Service.
- Alison Helen Lucy Cork, Founder and Chief Executive Officer, Alison at Home and Founder, Make It Your Business. For services to Female Entrepreneurship.
- Verena Cornwall, Head of Culture and Place, Royal Borough of Kensington and Chelsea. For services to Local Government and to the community in Kensington and Chelsea.
- Sally Cowan. For services to Sports Garment Research.
- Helen Claire Crackett. For Voluntary and Charitable Service in Shropshire.
- Peter Geoffrey Crawshaw, Volunteer, England Athletics. For services to Athletics.
- Susan Anne Crowley. For services to Public Libraries.
- Andrew Thomas Crummy, Designer and Artist. For services to Art and to Cultural Heritage in Scotland.
- Janine Alison Cryer, Founder, Representation Plus. For services to the Tourism and Hospitality Industry.
- Susan Shirley Cunningham, DL, lately President, North of Ireland Veterinary Association. For services to the Veterinary Profession in Northern Ireland.
- Stephen Curran, lately Council Leader, London Borough of Hounslow. For services to Local Government and to the community in Hounslow.
- Christopher Edward Curtis. For services to the Youth in Luton, Bedfordshire.
- Kate Alexandra Davidson. For services to Bereaved People in Bristol during Covid-19.
- Louise Davies, Director, lately Christians on the Left. For Political and Charitable Services.
- Mary Elizabeth Davies, Chief Executive Officer, Maiden Erlegh Trust. For services to Education.
- David Geoffrey Hall-Davies, Chief Executive Officer and Company Secretary, Cornwall YMCA. For services to Young People and to the community in Cornwall.
- Samantha Davys, Equality and Future Talent Manager, TalkTalk. For services to Young People and to Inclusion in Digital Industries.
- Elizabeth Mary Deignan. For services to Cycling.
- Anthony John Dent, lately Automotive Director, Bristol Port Company. For services to the Automotive Sector.
- Dr Brian George Mackie Dickie, Director of Research Development, Motor Neurone Disease Association. For services to Motor Neurone Disease Research.
- Scott Dickinson, Community Worker, Hadston House, Morpeth. For services to the community in Northumberland.
- Alimatu Yagbessay Dimonekene, Female Genital Mutilation Campaigner, Activist and Trainer. For services to the Prevention of Violence against Women and Girls.
- Jacqueline Dixon, Chief Executive, Antrim and Newtownabbey Council. For services to Local Government and to the community in Northern Ireland.
- Joanna Kathleen Dodd, lately Clerk of Divisions, Elections and Supply, House of Commons. For services to Parliament.
- Eileen Lilian Mary Donnelly, Member, Board of Governors, The Integrated College, Dungannon. For services to Education in Northern Ireland.
- Martin John Hamilton Dorey, Founder, #2minute campaigns. For services to Recycling and to the Environment.
- Nipa Devendra Doshi, Product and Furniture Designer. For services to Design.
- Lieutenant Commander Anthony James Eagles, RN, lately Helicopter Policy Specialist, Civil Aviation Authority. For services to Aviation Safety.
- Jacqueline Beverley Easson, DL. For Public and Charitable Service, particularly during Covid-19.
- Lily Ebert, BEM, For services to Holocaust Education.
- Robert Colin Elstone. For services to Sport.
- Hamish Murray Andrew Elvidge, BEM, Founder and lately Chair, The Support After Suicide Partnership. For services to Mental Health.
- Arit Eminue, Founder and Director, DiVA Apprenticeships. For services to Further Education in the Creative Industries.
- Felicity Emma Evans. For services to Children in Hertfordshire.
- Dr Mary Evelyn, Director of Postgraduate Programmes, London Contemporary Dance School. For services to Contemporary Dance and to Higher Education.
- Rupert William Evenett, Chair of Governing Body, Christ the King Sixth Forms, South London. For services to Education.
- Saleem Fazal, Co-Chair and Co-Founder, Freehold LGBT+ CIC. For services to Inclusion in the Property Industry.
- Valerie Fenn, Chair, Mid-Elmington Estate Tenants and Residents Association, London Borough of Southwark. For services to the community in Southwark.
- David Ferguson. For services to Squash in Scotland.
- Iresh Malintha Fernando, Global Head, Digital Experience and Accessibility, HSBC. For services to Digital Accessibility in Banking.
- Thomas Finnigan, Justice of the Peace. For services to the Administration of Justice and to the community in Dunbartonshire.
- William Fletcher. For services to Disadvantaged Communities.
- Dr Oluwole Olawale Folayan, Co-founder, Association for Black and Minority Ethnic Engineers UK. For services to Equality, Diversity and Inclusion in Engineering.
- Angela Foley, Unit Welfare Officer, 3 Royal School of Military Engineering Regiment. For services to Army Personnel and their Families.
- Janet Penelope Forshaw, Head of Education, Coram Life Education. For services to Education during Covid-19.
- Clive Daniel Foster, Senior Minister, Pilgrim Church. For services to the Windrush Generation.
- Lorraine Foster. For services to People with Learning Disabilities in Lisburn, Northern Ireland.
- Benjamin David Francis, Founder and Chief Executive Officer, Gymshark. For services to the Business Sector.
- Katharine Margaret Fay Francis. For services to the Welsh Food and Drink Industry.
- Mathew Frith, Urban Ecologist and Director of Policy and Research, London Wildlife Trust. For services to the Natural Environment.
- Mark David Gardner, Chief Executive, Community Security Trust. For services to the Jewish Community.
- Dr Godfrey Jonathan Gaston, lately Director, Centre for Secure Information Technologies. For services to Cyber Security Innovation.
- Conrad David Gayle, Diversity and Inclusion Manager, People Function, Crown Prosecution Service. For services to Law and Order.
- Susan Elizabeth Ghulam. For services to Children with Special Educational Needs and Disabilities.
- Dr Imelda Isabella Giarchi, Analyst, Scottish Government. For Public Service.
- John Gill. For services to the Arts, to Culture and to Education.
- Kenneth Brian Gill. For services to the community in Ryedale, North Yorkshire.
- Sally Ann Gillborn, Chief Executive, North Notts Business Improvement District. For services to Business and to the Economy in Nottinghamshire.
- Charlotte Jane Gilley, Founder and Chair, Maverick Stars Trust. For services to Boxing.
- Penelope Clare Gluckstein. For services to the community in the London Borough of Barnet, Greater London.
- Nigel William Goodband, lately Detective Sergeant, British Transport Police and Chair, British Transport Police Federation. For services to Policing.
- Dr Janice Victoria Gorlach, Deputy Chief Executive Officer, North East Learning Trust. For services to Education.
- Anne Patricia Gornall, Executive Director, Greater Manchester Learning Provider Network. For services to Further Education and to Skills.
- Sarah Jayne Golding, Disability Employment Adviser, Department for Work and Pensions. For Public Service.
- Carol Ann Graham. For services to the community in Edinburgh.
- Caroline Mary Grant, lately Head Teacher, Billing Brook Academy Trust, Northampton, Northamptonshire. For services to Children and Young People with Special Educational Needs and Disabilities.
- Deborah Joan Greaves, Curator, Tenterden and District Museum. For services to the community in Tenterden, Kent.
- Jane Fiona Green. For services to Neurodivergent People and those with related Joint Hypermobility Conditions including Ehlers-Danlos Syndromes.
- Suzanne Grimmer, lately Detective Inspector, Metropolitan Police Service. For services to Policing.
- Lance Owen Grundy, Prison Work Coach, Department for Work and Pensions. For Public Service.
- Brian Jozef Grzymek, lately Deputy Director, Department of Justice, Northern Ireland Executive. For Public and Voluntary Service in Northern Ireland.
- Jane Ann Gurney, Founder, Tilly Your Trailer Campaign. For services to the Agricultural Community.
- Professor Nihal Trevor Gurusinghe. For Charitable Services.
- Kathleen Margaret Joy Guthrie. For services to the Reserve Forces and to the Veteran Community in Northern Ireland.
- Pouria Hadjibagheri, lately Technical and Development Lead for the Coronavirus Dashboard, UK Health Security Agency. For services to Data Transparency during Covid-19.
- The Reverend Matthew Henry Hagan, Chaplain, Southern Area Hospice and Rector of Tynan, Aghavilly and Middletown Parishes, County Armagh. For services to Hospice Healthcare and to the community in Northern Ireland.
- Dr Vivienne Polita Connell-Hall, Senior Investigator, Service Complaints Ombudsman for the Armed Forces, Ministry of Defence. For services to Diversity and Inclusion.
- Angela Mary Ham, lately Head of Business Support Services, The National Memorial Arboretum. For services to National Commemoration.
- Marie Joanne Hamer, Executive Director, Strategy and Impact, Ambition Institute. For services to Education.
- Carol Ann Hamlett, Director, Transforming Choice. For services to Vulnerable People.
- Jonathan Hammond. For voluntary and charitable services to the community in Bingham, Nottinghamshire.
- David Philip Handley, Financial Capability Lead, Future Skills, HSBC UK. For services to Financial Education.
- Linda Margaret Hanna, Managing Director, Innovation and Investment, Scottish Enterprise. For services to the Scottish Business Community.
- Professor Edward Harcourt, lately Director of Research, Strategy and Innovation, Arts and Humanities Research Council. For services to Interdisciplinary Research.
- Professor Beverley Elizabeth Harden, Deputy Chief Allied Health Professions Officer, Health Education England. For services to Healthcare.
- David Hare, Chief Executive, Independent Healthcare Providers Network. For services to Healthcare, particularly during Covid-19.
- Alicia Charlotte Harper, Campaigner for Harper's Law. For services to Victims of Violent Crime and their Families.
- Andrew Harrison, Storeman, Ministry of Defence. For services to Defence.
- Stephanie Hart, End User Compute Lead, Network Rail. For services to the Railway and to Children's Education.
- Isaac Kofi Harvey, President, Wheels and Wheelchairs. For services to People with Disabilities.
- Julie Hawker, Joint Chief Executive Officer, Cosmic. For services to the Economy.
- Meryl Ann Hayward, Director, Corporate Services, Historic England. For services to Heritage.
- Professor Anne Heaslett, lately Principal, Stranmillis University College, Queen's University Belfast. For services to Education.
- Harry Heinz Heber, Volunteer, World Jewish Relief and the Association of Jewish Refugees. For Charitable Services and Holocaust Education.
- Professor Isobel Heyman, Consultant Psychiatrist, Psychological Medicine Team, Addenbrooke's Hospital and Honorary Consultant Psychiatrist, Great Ormond Street Hospital for Children. For services to Child and Adolescent Mental Health Services.
- Gaèl Hicks, Chief Executive Officer, Our Lady Of Grace Catholic Academy Trust, London Borough of Newham. For services to Education.
- Veronica Hilliard, Executive Headteacher, Golborne and Maxilla Children's Centres, Royal Borough of Kensington and Chelsea. For services to Early Years Education.
- Dr Keith Hiscock, Marine Biologist. For services to Marine Conservation.
- Richard Holmes, Managing Director, Cryer & Stott. For services to the British Food Industry.
- John Anthony Hood. For services to Mountain Rescue in Derbyshire.
- Professor Robert Allan Houston (Rab Houston), Emeritus Professor of Modern History, University of St Andrews. For services to Higher Education.
- Dr Marie Howley, lately Senior Lecturer, University of Northampton. For services to Children and Young People with Special Educational Needs and Disabilities.
- Jessica Jane Leyland-Barrett Hudson. For services to the community in Coventry, West Midlands.
- Bryndon Hughes, Founder and Trustee, PC Nicola Hughes Memorial Fund and Consultant, Victims Advisory Panel, Ministry of Justice. For services to People Affected by Crime.
- Shelly Jayne Quinton-Hulme. For services to the community in Stretford, Greater Manchester.
- Alexander Melvin Alistair Hume, Chair, Isle of Arran Mountain Rescue. For services to Mountain Rescue.
- Helen Joanne Humphrey. For services to Women in Sport Leadership.
- Shadim Hussain, Chief Executive, My Foster Family. For services to Equality and to the Foster Care System.
- Anna Christina Ince, Chief Executive Officer, Resonate. For services to the Railway Industry.
- Sally Ann Ingram, Director, Student Health and Wellbeing Services, Newcastle University. For services to Student Mental Health and Wellbeing.
- Peter Desmond Jack. For services to Endurance Sport and Charity in Northern Ireland.
- Dominic Jacquesson, Vice President, Insight and Talent, Index Ventures. For services to Technology and to Entrepreneurship.
- Kim Elizabeth James, Head of School Improvement. Oxfordshire County Council. For services to Education.
- Peter Robert Jardine, Volunteer, Isle of Wight Steam Railway. For services to Heritage Railway.
- Terry Jewell, Station Manager, Essex Fire and Rescue Service. For services to International Search and Rescue.
- The Reverend Dr. Margaret Jane Joachim, Chair, English Candidates' Committee, Liberal Democrats. For services to Women in Politics.
- Sarah Johal, Strategic Leader, Regional Adoption Agencies. For services to Adoption and Fostering.
- Inderpaul Singh Johar, Co-Founder, Dark Matters Laboratories. For services to Architecture.
- Susan Johnson, Deputy Chair, SPARTA, Department for Levelling Up, Housing and Communities. For services to Health and Well-Being.
- Timothy Brett Johnson, lately Chief Executive Officer, Great Ormond Street Hospital Charity. For services to Young People.
- Christopher Dennis Jones, Project Director, Sandwell Aquatics Centre, Birmingham 2022 Commonwealth Games. For services to Sport and to the community in the West Midlands.
- Gillian Rosalind Jones, lately H.M. Inspector and Deputy Director of Schools and Early Years, Ofsted. For services to Education.
- Ian Jones, Chief Executive, Volunteer Cornwall. For services to volunteering in Cornwall.
- Martin Clifford Jones, Chief Executive Officer, Home Instead UK Ltd. For services to Older People.
- William Jones, lately National Officer for the GMB Senior and Chief Officers of Probation Trade Union. For Public Service.
- Rabbi David Michael Kale, Faith Leader, Belfast Synagogue. For services to the Jewish Community in Northern Ireland.
- Dr Atiya Kamal, Health Psychologist and Senior Lecturer, School of Social Sciences, Birmingham City University. For services to Health Psychology during Covid-19.
- Christopher Kamara. For services to Association Football, to Anti-Racism and to Charity.
- Samuel James Kee, Community Development Worker. For services to the community in County Londonderry.
- Barry James Kempton, Independent Chair, Oldham Opportunity Area. For services to Education and Social Mobility in Oldham.
- Ruth Ann Kerry, Victim Liaison Officer, Yorkshire and the Humber Public Protection Unit, Probation Service, H.M. Prison and Probation Service. For services to Victims.
- Edward David Kersey. For services to Young People and to the Bideford Boxing Club, North Devon.
- Colin Leslie Albert Keywood, Medical Support Volunteer, St. John Ambulance Sussex. For voluntary service to First Aid in East and West Sussex.
- Mohammed Wakkas Khan, DL, Founder, Young Interfaith. For services to Charity, to Young People and to Interfaith Relations.
- Gavin Joseph Killeen, DL, Managing Director, Nuprint Technologies Ltd. For services to Further Education in Northern Ireland.
- Margaret Anne King. For services to Education and to the community in Cheshire.
- Professor Marian Knight, Professor of Maternal and Child Population Health, University of Oxford. For services to Maternal and Public Health.
- Robyn Catherine Knox, Director, Voluntary Community Sector Emergencies Partnership. For services to Charity and to Communities affected by Major Emergencies.
- Rachel De-lahay, Playwright and Screenwriter. For services to Drama.
- Elliott Albert Lancaster. For services to Youth Empowerment and Sustainability in Staffordshire.
- Robert Leckey. For services to Education in County Down, Northern Ireland.
- Dean Ledger, Lead IT Engineer, Royal Navy Maritime Support Unit, Carbon60 Ltd. For services to the Royal Navy.
- Dr Catherine Lee, Professor of Inclusive Education and Leadership and Deputy Dean for Education, Anglia Ruskin University. For services to Equality in Education.
- Professor David Nicholas Lerner (Barney Lerner). For services to the Environment in Bradford, West Yorkshire.
- Paul St John Letman, Chair, Companions of the Order of Malta. For Charitable Service.
- Jonathan Towse Levien, Product and Furniture Designer. For services to Design.
- Ajibola Tokunboh Lewis, Campaigner, for the Mental Health Units (Use of Force) Act. For services to Mental Health.
- Christine Joyce Lewis, lately Headteacher, Children's House Nursery School, London Borough of Tower Hamlets. For services to Education.
- Morag Liddell, lately Senior Charge Nurse, Neonatal Unit, Royal Hospital for Children, Glasgow. For services to Paediatric and Neonatal Nursing.
- Stuart William Liddell, Pipe Major, Inveraray and District Pipe Band. For services to Piping and Music Education.
- Jeffrey Ronald Liddiatt. For services to Nuclear Test Veterans and to the community in Bristol.
- Shirley Ann Helen Linton. For Charitable Service in Dundee.
- Jemima Lipton, Team Leader, Ministry of Defence. For services to Defence.
- Kim Alison Little. For services to Association Football.
- Mavis Little, Community Champion. For services to Charity and to Vulnerable People in the City of Edinburgh.
- Dr Alison Florence Livingstone, Paediatrician, Northern Health and Social Care Trust. For services to Safeguarding Children in Northern Ireland.
- Professor Andrew Steven Lockey, President, Resuscitation Council UK. For services to Resuscitation Training.
- David Robert Lockyer, Legal Advisor, Westminster Magistrates' Court, H.M. Courts and Tribunal Service. For Public and Voluntary Service.
- Christopher John Long, Founder and Director, Earthdive and Chair, Putteridge Swimming Club. For services to Marine Conservation, to Charity and to Sport.
- Alexander Christian Per Lovén, Founder, Net World Sports. For services to the Economy and to the community in Wrexham.
- Edward Fletcher Lynch, Co-founder, RJC Dance. For services to Dance.
- Iain Aitken Mackinnon, lately Secretary, Maritime Skills Alliance. For services to the Maritime Sector.
- Geraldine Stewart MacLaine. For services to the community in the London Borough of Redbridge, Greater London.
- Lucy Wolcott Maguire, Founder, Chief Executive Officer and Programme Director, Nucleo. For services to Children and Young People.
- Dr Shaid Mahmood, Chair of Governors, Leeds City College Group. For services to Further Education in Leeds.
- Edward Roger Mallinson, Chair and Boat Manager, The Shamrock Trust. For services to Steam Boating Heritage and to the community in Cumbria.
- Professor David Charles Mangham, Professor of Musculoskeletal Pathology, University of Manchester and Manchester University NHS Foundation Trust. For services to Forensic Science.
- David Claude Ernest Mann, Co-chair, Freehold LGBT+ CIC. For services to Inclusion in the Property Industry.
- Jaspal Singh Mann, Director, Simply Shred and Recycle Ltd. For services to the Environment.
- Jane Chelliah-Manning, Policy Lead, Marine Sector, Department for Business, Energy and Industrial Strategy. For Public Service.
- Yiannis Kyriacos Maos, Founder and Chief Executive Officer, Birmingham Tech CIC. For services to the Technology Sector.
- Susan Hickson-Marsay, Pilot Launch Coxswain, Association British Ports and Chair, Station Manager and Training Officer, Hornsea Inshore Rescue. For services to the community in Hornsea, East Riding of Yorkshire and to Maritime Safety.
- Jennie Kristina Martin, Director General, ITS-UK. For services to Transport Technology.
- Paula Margaret Matthews, Farmer. For services to Sustainable Agriculture.
- Elizabeth Annette Maytom, Project Manager, Norwood and Brixton Foodbank. For services to the community in the London Borough of Lambeth, particularly during Covid-19.
- Helen Esther McAleavy, Private Secretary to the Chief Medical Officer, Department of Health and Social Care. For Public Service.
- Richard James George McAvoy, Armed Forces Champion, Department for Work and Pensions. For Public Service.
- Peter Anthony McBride. For services to the Economy and to the community in County Tyrone.
- Mary McCourt, Campaigner for Helen's Law and Support After Murder and Manslaughter Merseyside. For services to Families of the Victims of Unlawful Killing.
- Katrina McDonnell, Founder, Homeless Period Belfast. For services to Women's Health.
- James Anderson McEwan. For services to the Scotch Whisky Industry and to the community in Islay.
- Patrick Joseph McGurn, Chief Executive Officer, Lakeland Community Care. For services to the community in County Fermanagh and Tyrone.
- Professor Sonja Jayne McIlfatrick, Dean, Ulster Doctoral College and Professor of Nursing and Palliative Care, Ulster University. For services to Higher Education and to Public Health.
- Natalie Olivia Gasson-McKinley, Development Manager, Federation of Small Businesses. For services to Business in the East Midlands.
- Penelope Lewis McKissock. For services to the community in Somerset.
- Samuel McKnight, Founder, Hair by Sam McKnight. For services to the Fashion and Beauty Industries.
- Teresa Michelle McLaughlin, Student Engagement and Student Voice Lead, Trafford College Group, Trafford, Greater Manchester. For services to Education.
- Hugh McLean. For services to the community in Oban and Lorn, Scotland.
- Margaret Alison McLennan, lately Deputy Leader, Brent Council, London Borough of Brent. For services to Digital Inclusion and to the community in Brent.
- Bethany Jane Mead. For services to Association Football.
- Dr. Joel Meyer, Co-Founder, Life Lines and Intensive Care Consultant, Guy's and St Thomas' NHS Foundation Trust. For services to the NHS during Covid-19.
- Sophie Clare Milliken, Founder and Chief Executive Officer, Moja Group. For services to Business and to Education.
- Nicholas John Millington, Director, Safety Task Force, Network Rail. For services to the Railway and to the NHS during Covid-19.
- John Mills, Vice-Chair and Director of Operations, Vasculitis UK. For services to People with Rare Diseases.
- Professor Eugene Michael Gerard Milne, lately Director of Public Health, Newcastle City Council. For services to Public Health and Wellbeing.
- Syed Khaja Mohi Moinuddin, Customs Cooperation Agreements Lead, H.M. Revenue and Customs. For Public Service.
- Aston Moore, National Coach, British Athletics. For services to Athletics.
- Simon Peter Couldrey Moring, Detective Superintendent, Metropolitan Police Service. For services to Health and Wellbeing.
- Elizabeth Morley. For services to the community in Bolton and Bury, Greater Manchester.
- Sheila Mary Morrison, lately Governor, Meadow Primary School, Epsom, Surrey. For services to Education.
- Dr Stephen Huang Mowle, Honorary Treasurer, Royal College of General Practitioners and General Practitioner, Hetherington Group Practice, London Borough of Lambeth. For services to Healthcare.
- Bejay Mulenga, Founder, Supa Network. For services to Entrepreneurship and to Tackling Food Poverty.
- Simon Alexander James Mundy, Lawyer, Department for Environment, Food and Rural Affairs, Legal Advisers, Government Legal Department. For Public and Voluntary Service.
- Major Derek John Munro, Cadet Executive Officer, Gwent and Powys Army Cadet Force. For services to the Army Cadet Forces in South Wales.
- Sarah Munro, Director, BALTIC Centre for Contemporary Art. For services to Art.
- Susan Elizabeth Murphy, Mayor, St Helens Metropolitan Borough Council. For Public and Political Service.
- Professor Syed Naseem Naqvi, President, British Blockchain Association. For services to Blockchain and Distributed Ledger Technologies.
- Hammad Nasar, Curator, Author and Art Historian. For services to the Arts.
- Catherine May Nash, lately Manager, Pirelli Stadium Vaccination Centre. For services to the community in East Staffordshire during Covid-19.
- Dr Nooralhaq Nasimi, Founder, Afghanistan and Central Asian Association. For services to Refugees.
- Paul Nee, Deputy Director SEND, Westminster Kingsway College, Greater London. For services to Further Education.
- Thomas George Nellist, Chair, Hereford Agricultural Associations and Clubs. For voluntary and charitable services in Herefordshire.
- Ivanson Ranny Nelson (Johnny Nelson). For services to Boxing and to Young People in South Yorkshire.
- Margaret Isabel MacGregor Nicolson (Margaret MacLeod). For services to the Scottish Gaelic Language.
- George Frederick Nixon. For services to the community in Headley, Surrey.
- Jennifer Irene Nolan, Founder and lately Manager, Lawrence Home Nursing Team Ltd. For services to End of Life Care.
- Oliemata O'Donoghue, lately Network Regional Director, Wealth and Personal Banking, HSBC UK. For services to Diversity in the Financial Services Sector.
- Stephen O'Dowd, Officer, National Crime Agency. For services to Law Enforcement.
- Robert Geoffrey Oliver, lately Chief Executive Officer, Construction Equipment Association. For services to the Construction Equipment Manufacturing Sector.
- William Oliver, DL. For services to Education, to Business and to Charities in County Londonderry.
- Dr Chaim Harry Olmer, BEM, Educator, Holocaust Educational Trust. For services to Holocaust Education.
- Nicholas Jeffrey Owen, Team Leader, Langdale and Ambleside Mountain Rescue. For services to Mountain Rescue.
- Dewi Owens. For Political and Public Service in North Wales.
- Cleopatra Mary Palmer (Cleo Sylvestre). For services to Drama and to Charity.
- James Bernard Partridge, Artisan. For services to Design.
- Bhavena Patel, Senior Relationship Manager, Institute for Apprenticeships and Technical Education, Department for Education. For services to Further Education.
- Veejaykumar Chimanlal Patel, Founder, Business 2 Business UK Ltd. For services to Employment and Training.
- Evelyn Jean Pattinson, Founder, Eden Riding for the Disabled Group. For Charitable Services.
- Nicola Irene Percival, Project Delivery, Borders and Enforcement, Home Office. For Public Service.
- James Nicholas Pharaoh, Founder and Director, Bedford Fringe Festival. For services to the Arts and to the community in Bedford, Bedfordshire.
- Brian Richard Phillips, Volunteer and Founding Trustee, Petty Pool Trust. For services to Children and Young People.
- Sylvia Pierce, Founder and Chair of Governors, Mossbourne Community Academy, London Borough of Hackney. For services to Education.
- Professor Prashant Pillai, Director, Cyber Quarter and Associate Dean, University of Woverhampton. For services to Cyber Security and to Education.
- Dr Ingrid Pollard, Artist. For services to Art.
- Julianne Ponan, Chief Executive Officer, Creative Nature. For services to Business, to Exports and to People with Allergies.
- Heather Pratt, Chair, Board of Governors, Rossmar Special School, Limavady, County Londonderry. For services to Education.
- Aneeta Prem, JP, Founder and President, Freedom Charity. For Charitable Service.
- Professor Ruth Lesley Price, Professor and Co-Lead, Safeguarding Health through Infection Prevention Research Group. For services to Public Health in Scotland during Covid-19.
- Louise Spears Durham Purvis. For voluntary service to the Prison Community in Scotland.
- Dr Mohammed Qasim, Lecturer and Welfare Officer, Gower College, Swansea. For services to Academic Research and to Young People.
- Abdul Aziz Qazi, Imam and Founder, Jamia Islamia Ghousia Trust. For services to the community in Luton.
- Jillian Claire Quinn, Founder and Chief Executive Officer, Dementia Forward. For services to People with Dementia.
- Anthony David Rapson, lately Head of the General Aviation Safety Strategy Study, Civil Aviation Authority. For services to General Aviation and to Aviation Safety.
- Zebina Ratansi, Director of Nursing, Whipps Cross University Hospital, Barts Health NHS Trust. For services to Nursing Leadership.
- Indigo Redfern. For services to the community in Gloucestershire, particularly during Covid-19.
- Gail Redmond. For services to Association Football in Northern Ireland.
- Caroline Elizabeth Reid, Regional Director of Commissioning, NHS England and Improvement. For services to the Covid-19 Vaccination Programme in South East England.
- John Patrick Reyntiens, Stained Glass Artist. For services to Art and to Heritage.
- Christine Imogen Rice, Opera Singer. For services to Opera.
- Rachel Annabelle Riley, Campaigner. For services to Holocaust Education.
- Charles James Ritchie, Co-Founder, Gambling with Lives. For services to Charity and to the Families Bereaved by Gambling Related Suicides.
- Elisabeth Ritchie (Elisabeth Katis), Co-Founder, Gambling with Lives. For services to Charity and to Families Bereaved by Gambling Related Suicides.
- Sheila Ewen Ritchie. For Political Service in Scotland.
- Aurfron Roberts, Member, Rhondda Cynon Taff County Borough Council. For Political and Public Service.
- Andrew Henry Robertson. For services to Association Football, to Charity and to Young People.
- Professor Pamela Beaumont Robertson, FRSE, lately Curator, The Hunterian Art Gallery, University of Glasgow. For services to Architecture.
- Betsey Yoke-Chan Lau-Robinson, Head of Adult Safeguarding and the Mental Capacity Act, University College London Hospitals NHS Foundation Trust. For services to Patient Safeguarding.
- Jawahir Roble, Referee and Volunteer, Football Beyond Borders. For services to Association Football.
- Nigel Rhyl Robson, Chair, Western Excellence in Learning and Leadership. For services to Education.
- Professor Rebecca Louise Rose, Co-founder, Life Lines and Professor of Critical Care Nursing, Florence Nightingale Faculty of Nursing, Midwifery and Palliative Care. For services to the NHS during Covid-19.
- Linda Rosenblatt, Chair, World Jewish Relief Connections Committee. For services to Charity in the UK and Abroad.
- Lynne Rowley, lately Chair, British Association of Prosthetists and Orthotists. For services to the Allied Health Professions.
- Mark Victor Peter Ruston, Inspector, Devon and Cornwall Police. For services to Policing.
- Alexander Hore-Ruthven, Chair, South West Committee, BBC Children in Need and Chief Executive Officer, Creative Youth Network. For services to Young People in Bristol.
- Shane Richard Ryan, Founder and Chair, Westminster Young Foundation and Chair, Grenfell Young People's Fund. For services to Disadvantaged Young People and to Charity.
- Dr Naomi Esther Katz Sacks, Clinical Director, West Hill Health Primary Care Network. For services to the NHS during Covid-19.
- Bianca Daniella Sakol, Founder and Chief Executive, Sebby's Corner. For services to Disadvantaged People, particularly Refugees.
- Samantha Salaver, Head of Dental Nursing, Guy's and St Thomas' NHS Foundation Trust. For services to Dental Nursing.
- June Deidre Sanders, President, Family Lives. For services to Charity and Mental Health.
- Alison Jennifer Saunders, Headteacher, Simon Balle All-Through School, Hertford, Hertfordshire. For services to Education.
- Andrew Peter Saunders, lately Chair, Southern Regional College, (Further and Higher Education College), County Armagh and County Down. For services to the Further Education Sector in Northern Ireland.
- Susan Katriona Sayer, Founder and Director, The Seal Research Trust. For services to Wildlife Protection and Conservation.
- Victoria Schofield, Service Director, Children's Social Care, Wakefield Metropolitan Borough Council. For services to Children and Young People.
- Sally Anne Schupke. For services to the community in Shalford, Surrey
- Elizabeth Scott, Client Engagement Director, Tech Nation. For services to the Technology Sector.
- Joanne Claire Scott, Commercial Lead, Vaccine Taskforce. For services to Public Health during Covid-19.
- Lauren Scott, Executive Director, Refugees at Home. For services to Refugees.
- Professor Michael Gordon Scott, Director, Medicines Optimisation Innovation Centre. For services to Pharmacy in Northern Ireland.
- Jonathan Michael Holmes Sellors, Legal Counsel and Company Secretary, UK Biobank and UK Biocentre. For services to Medical Research.
- Bernadette Adele Rosaline, The Lady Sewell, Fundraiser, Ovacome. For charitable services to People with Ovarian Cancer.
- Dr Jyotiben Shah, Macmillan Consultant Urological Surgeon, University Hospitals of Derby and Burton NHS Foundation Trust. For services to Medicine.
- Cynthia Shaw, J.P. For services to the community in Rotherham, South Yorkshire.
- Michael Shaw, Officer, National Crime Agency. For services to Law Enforcement.
- Louise Vesely-Shore, lately Officer, National Crime Agency. For services to Law Enforcement and to Diversity.
- June Simm, Chair of Governors, Emmaus Church of England and Catholic Primary School, Liverpool, Merseyside. For services to Education.
- Francesca Isabella Simon, Writer. For services to Literature.
- John William Singleton, Founder and Chair, LifeLine. For Charitable Services.
- Julia Christl Skelton, Executive Director, Mind the Gap. For services to Theatre and to the community in Bradford.
- Professor Charlotte Anne Skitterall, Group Chief Pharmacist, Manchester University NHS Foundation Trust. For services to Pharmacy.
- Stephen Slater, Director and Chief Executive Officer, Light Aircraft Association. For services to Diversity in the Aviation Industry.
- William Smith, Chair, Hillwood Football Club, Pollok, Glasgow. For services to the community in Pollok, Glasgow.
- Michael Anthony Smyth, Chair, Energy4All. For services to the Environment.
- Susan Madeleine Smyth. For services to Children and Young People in the East Riding of Yorkshire.
- Veronica Snow, National Programme Lead, End of Life Care Wales. For services to Palliative Care in Wales.
- David George Southgate. For services to Charity and to the community in Norwich, Norfolk.
- Ruth Southgate. For services to Charity and to the community in Norwich, Norfolk.
- Stuart John Speding, Strategist and Project Lead, Vaccine Taskforce, Department for Business, Energy, and Industrial Strategy. For services to Public Health during Covid-19.
- Robert Thompson Splaine. For services to the community in Atherton, Greater Manchester and the North West.
- Dr Malcolm Monteith Steven, Founder and Trustee, The Puffin Hydrotherapy Pool Charity. For services to the community in the Highlands and Islands.
- Richard Charles Barrington Stevens, DL, Managing Director, Go South West. For services to Transport and to the community in Plymouth, Devon.
- John Stewart, District Chairman, Royal British Legion Northern Ireland. For services to Veterans.
- Terence Stocks, Director, UK Head of Public Sector, Faithful + Gould. For services to Construction Innovation.
- Alana Stott. For services to Vulnerable Women and to Mental Health Awareness.
- Dupre Alexander Strutt, Mechanic, Kirkwall Lifeboat Station and lately Area Lifesaving Manager for Scotland, Royal National Lifeboat Institution. For services to Maritime Safety.
- John Robert Sutton, Director of Amateur Choirs. For services to Charitable Fundraising.
- Major (Rtd.) David Anthony Swann, TD, County Chairman, Essex, Royal British Legion. For services to Veterans.
- Professor Helen Margaret Sweetland, Clinical Professor, School of Medicine, Cardiff University. For services to Patient Care and Medical Education.
- Anne Tallentire, Artist and Teacher. For services to the Arts.
- Geoffrey Michael Windsor Taylor, Chief Executive, BPI and the Brit Awards. For services to Music.
- Professor Jacqueline Taylor, President, Royal College of Physicians and Surgeons of Glasgow. For services to Medical Education and to Health.
- Nicola Taylor, National Coordinator, Fashion Revolution Scotland. For services to the Promotion of Net Zero Apparel in Scotland.
- Professor Roy Taylor, Emeritus Professor of Medicine and Metabolism in Translational and Clinical Research, Newcastle University. For services to Diabetic Research.
- Steven Robert Tennet, Border Force Higher Officer, Freight Intensification Team, Home Office. For Public Service.
- Dr Michael Gary Thomas, Musical Director. For services to the Welsh Male Voice Choirs of the Pelenna Valley and the Cynon Valley.
- Dr Sian Thomas, Chief Data Officer, Department for International Trade. For Public Service.
- Professor Simon Benjamin Nicholas Thompson. For services to Clinical Psychology Education and to Health Care Improvement.
- Jahran Allen-Thompson, Mortuary Service Operations Manager, London Borough of Waltham Forest. For services to Local Government.
- Celia Margaret Lloyd Sinclair Thornqvist, Founder and Chair, The Willow Tea Rooms Trust. For services to the Restoration of the Charles Rennie Mackintosh Willow Tea Rooms.
- Janet Mary Thurgood, lately Corporate Director for Adult Social Care, Bournemouth Christchurch and Poole Council. For services to People with Learning Disabilities.
- Cynthia Nkiruka Tooley, BEM, Founder, Jedidah Charity. For services to Business, to Mentoring and to Charity.
- Joanna Rachel Tongue, Director, Women in Football. For services to Association Football and to Gender Equality.
- Deborah Ann Twitchen, Community Volunteer, Tenants of Lewes District, East Sussex. For Voluntary Service.
- Rama Venchard, Chair of Trustees, STEP Academy Trust. For services to Education.
- Keranjeet Kaur Virdee, Chief Executive and Artistic Director, South Asian Arts UK. For services to the Arts, particularly South Asian Music and Dance.
- Ursula Margaret Waite (Ursula Lavery). For services to the Agri-Food Industry and to the Economy in Northern Ireland.
- Jonathan Gerard Wakeman, Founder and Artistic Director, East Street Arts. For services to the Arts.
- Dr Verona Gee Walker, Founder and Patron, The Anthony Walker Foundation. For services to Diversity and Racial Injustice.
- Lorna Esmé Margery Walker, Honorary Senior Lecturer of Medieval History, University of St Andrews. For services to Higher Education.
- Elizabeth Anne Walmsley, Artisan. For services to Design.
- Professor Sarah Wanless, FRSE, Emeritus Fellow, UK Centre for Ecology and Hydrology. For services to Seabird Ecology.
- Francesca Isabel Warner (Check Warner), Co-Founder, Ada Ventures, Diversity VC. For services to Equality and Diversity in the Venture Capital Sector.
- Jean Louise Watson, Operations Manager, English Institute of Sport. For services to Sport.
- Karen Watson, Founder and Artistic Director, East Street Arts. For services to the Arts.
- Steven John Watts. For services to Charitable Fundraising.
- Pauline Weatherall, Digital Atlas Manager, National Oceanography Centre. For services to Bathymetry.
- Matthew Webb, Officer, National Crime Agency. For services to Law Enforcement.
- Ian Granville Whalley, Deputy Chair, National Fundraising Officer and Volunteer Senior Watchkeeper, National Coastwatch Institute. For services to Public Safety and to Charity.
- Helena Whitbread, Historian and Editor. For services to History and to Literature.
- Jenifer Jane White, Historic Landscape Adviser, Historic England. For services to Heritage and to Historic Parks and Gardens.
- Rachael Clare Whitaker, Policy Manager, Offender Health and Secure Services, Department of Health and Social Care. For services to Mental Health Policy.
- Scott Wilde, Team Leader, Ministry of Defence. For services to Defence.
- Christopher David Wilkins, Chief Executive and Co-Founder, The Sporting Memories Foundation. For services to People Living with Dementia and Loneliness.
- Geoffrey David Wilkinson. For services to People with Disabilities in Southampton, Hampshire.
- Alice Williams, Founder and Chief Executive Officer, Luminary Bakery. For services to Women and to Charity.
- Karen Lesley Williams, Administrative Officer, Welshpool Magistrates' Court, H.M. Courts and Tribunals Service. For services to the Administration of Justice and to Charity.
- Kathleen Winnifred Williams, OLY, Co-Founder and Director, RJC Dance. For services to Dance.
- Anthony John Millington Willis, Chair and Trustee, Surrey Clubs for Young People. For services to Young People in Surrey.
- Dr Ann-Marie Wilson, Founder and Executive Director, 28 Too Many. For services to the Prevention of Violence Against Women and Girls.
- Joseph Norman Wilson. For services to Business and to the community in Northern Ireland.
- Margaret Elizabeth Wilson, Chair, National Parent Forum. For services to Education in Scotland.
- Shirley Catherine Wilson. For services to the Deaf and Deaf/Blind Communities.
- John Woodnutt, Founder Delmatic Lighting Control. For services to Business and to Entrepreneurship.
- Claire Ruth Wright, Patron and Volunteer Fundraiser, Hope and Homes for Children. For services to Young People and to Charity.
- Patricia Ann Wright, lately Director of Access and Inclusion, Haringey Learning Partnership, London Borough of Haringey. For services to Education.
- Bertha Daniel Yakubu, Community Activist. For services to the African Community and to Integration in Scotland.
- Helen Mary Yeadon, Co-Founder and Chief Executive, Greatwood Horse Charity. For services to Disadvantaged Young People and to former Racehorses.
- Samuel Godfrey Young. For services to Social Work and to Education.
- Elisa Rubio Yubero, Head of Provisioning, Parliamentary Digital Service. For services to Parliament.

=== Royal Red Cross ===
Ribbon bar of the Royal Red Cross

==== Members of the Royal Red Cross (RRC) ====
- Lieutenant Colonel Gary Martin, Queen Alexandra's Royal Army Nursing Corps
- Group Captain Emma Louise Redman

==== Associate of the Royal Red Cross (ARRC) ====
- Lieutenant Commander Sarah Elizabeth Dewey, Queen Alexandra's Royal Naval Nursing Service
- Chief Petty Officer Robert Chambers, Queen Alexandra's Royal Naval Nursing Service
- Major Michael Ian Collins, Queen Alexandra's Royal Army Nursing Corps
- Major Shaun Francis Stainislaus McGarry, Queen Alexandra's Royal Army Nursing Corps
- Wing Commander Graham Michael Percival
- Wing Commander Sharon Melanie Wheeler

=== British Empire Medal (BEM) ===
Ribbon bar of the British Empire Medal

- Nura Omar Aabe, Founder, Autism Independence. For services to People with Autism.
- David Allard. For services to the community in Royston, Hertfordshire.
- Mavis Maxine Amankwah, Business Coach, Mentor and Diversity Communications Specialist. For services to Business and to Entrepreneurship.
- Susan Anne Anderson, Founder Member, Barton Group Riding for the Disabled. For services to People with Disabilities and to the community in Linton, Cambridgeshire.
- Martin Robert Gervas Andrew. For services to the community in Aylesbury, Buckinghamshire, particularly during Covid-19.
- Donald Armstrong. For services to Music and to the community in Dingwall, Scotland.
- Sheila Ashburner. For services to the community in Milnthorpe, Cumbria.
- Diana Marion Ashdown. For services to the community in Cheltenham, Gloucestershire.
- Christopher Paul Ashworth, Estates Manager, Ashton Sixth Form College. For services to Further Education.
- Zulqarnain Tony Aslam, Councillor, Wellingborough Town Council. For services to the community in Wellingborough during Covid-19.
- Neil Atherton, Bus Driver, Arriva North West and Wales. For services to Public Transport and to the community in Liverpool and Widnes during Covid-19.
- Roger David Atterwill, Chair, Swanton Morley Parish Council and Councillor, Breckland District Council. For services to Local Government and the community in Norfolk.
- Maxwell Apaladaga Ayamba, Founder, Sheffield Environmental Movement. For services to the Environment and to the community in Sheffield, South Yorkshire.
- Nicola Baboneau, Community Volunteer and Community Assessor, Metropolitan Police Service. For services to the community in the London Borough of Hackney.
- Susan Carolyn Baker. For services to the community in Charlton, Northamptonshire.
- Susan Ball, Teaching Assistant, St Vincent's Roman Catholic Primary School, Mill Hill, London Borough of Barnet. For services to Education.
- Barry Ballard. For services to the community in the London Borough of Wandsworth, particularly during Covid-19.
- Joanne Margaret Barber, Coach, North East Disability Swimming Club. For services to the community in North East England.
- William Sinclair Barbour. For services to Scottish Country Dancing.
- Martin Peter Beard. For services to the community in West Norwood, London Borough of Lambeth.
- Jacqueline Joan Beaumont, Founder and Patron, Oxfordshire Oesophageal and Stomach Organisation. For services to People with Cancer.
- Ian Martin Beazley, lately Senior Officer, Fraud Investigation Service, H.M. Revenue and Customs. For services to Asset Recovery.
- Shah Sheikh Shepali Begum, lately Outreach and Impacts Manager, Commonwealth Games Legacy Team. For services to Equality, Diversity and Inclusion.
- Angela Marie Bennett. For voluntary service to the community in Plymouth, Devon.
- Dr. Wirinder Kumar Amar Nath Bhatiani, lately Chair, NHS Bolton Clinical Commissioning Group. For services to Health and to Diversity in Greater Manchester.
- Marjorie Zoe Black, Police Staff Community Assessor, West Yorkshire Police. For services to Policing and to Charity.
- Valerie Blackmur. For services to the community in King's Lynn, Norfolk.
- Thomas Blundell. For services to the community in Frodsham, Cheshire.
- Sarah Anne Brewis, Headteacher, Woodborough Church of England Primary School, Pewsey, Wiltshire. For services to Primary Education.
- Mark Stephen Bridel, Regional Freight Manager, Network Rail. For services to Charity and to the community in York, North Yorkshire.
- Joe Broughton, Director, The Conservatoire Folk Ensemble. For services to Music.
- Michael Brown. For services to Holocaust Education and Awareness.
- Carolyn Jane Brunton. For voluntary and charitable services to Cancer Research UK.
- Mary Buck. For services to the NHS and to the community in Dorset, particularly during Covid-19.
- Troyton Bronick Theophilus Bunbury, lately Site Manager, St Michael's Church of England Primary School, Highgate, London Borough of Haringey. For services to Education.
- Andrew Burnett. For services to the community in Peckham and Nunhead, London Borough of Southwark, during Covid-19.
- Stephen Burns, Road Sweeper, Mid and East Antrim Borough Council. For services to the community in Portglenone, County Antrim.
- Dr. Patricia Kay Vella-Burrows, Co-Director and Director of Training, Music4Wellbeing. For services to Wellbeing.
- Ziana Ayesha Butt. For services to Netball and to Diversity.
- Patricia Jean Cargill, Chair, Patient Partnership Group, Nottingham University Hospitals NHS Trust. For services to NHS Patients.
- William Edward Carne. For services to Sport and to Charity in Pembrokeshire.
- Beryl Carr, NHS Volunteer, League of Friends Café, Ealing Hospital, London Borough of Ealing. For services to the community in West London.
- Saera Meryll Carter. For services to the community in Stoke Poges, Buckinghamshire.
- Susan Jane Chambers, Convenor, Parents of Autistic Spectrum Disorder Adults. For services to People with Autism in Edinburgh and the Lothians.
- Jean Margaret Church. For services to the community in Waltham Abbey, Essex.
- Angela Verona Clarke, Chief Executive Officer, RAFFA International Development Agency. For services to the Windrush Generation.
- Allan Peter Clarkin. For services to Martial Arts and to the community in Lancashire.
- Leslie John Coates. For services to Conservation and to the community in Charlton Kings, Cheltenham, Gloucestershire.
- Sarah Jane Coffey, Executive Assistant to the Chief Executive Officer, Birmingham 2022 Commonwealth Games. For services to Sport.
- Robert James Collins (Seamus Collins). For services to Seriously Ill Children.
- William John Collins, Lifeboat Operations Manager, Kirkcudbright Lifeboat Station, Royal National Lifeboat Institution. For services to Maritime Safety.
- Jane Cook, Foster Carer, Birmingham Children's Trust. For services to Fostering.
- Roberta Joan Cooke, Manager, Caw Community Playgroup, Londonderry. For services to Early Years Learning.
- Kelly Coombs. For services to the community in Southminster, Essex during Covid-19.
- David Cooney, Committee Member, Cambuslang Harriers Athletics Club. For services to Athletics.
- Hilary Judith Cooper, Girlguiding Leader, School Governor and Volunteer. For services to Young People and to Education.
- Andrea Dawn Corrie, Water Safety Campaigner. For services to Water Safety in the Royal Borough of Kingston upon Thames.
- Polly Jane Cox. For services to the community in Shalbourne, Wiltshire.
- David Cross, Storekeeper, Royal Navy Maritime Support Unit, Carbon60 Ltd. For services to the Royal Navy and to Naval Veterans.
- Nicholas John Cross, Instructor, West Wiltshire Sailing Association. For services to Young People and to Charity.
- Tracey Crothers. For services to the community in Maghaberry, County Antrim.
- Toni Hanlon-Crown, Work Group Leader, Child Maintenance Group, Department for Work and Pensions. For services to the community in Merseyside and to the Covid-19 Response.
- Christopher Robert David Cuddy. For voluntary service to the community in Northern Ireland.
- Marjorie Florence Culham, Fundraiser, Guide Dogs Association. For voluntary and charitable services to People with Visual Impairments.
- Jane Eleanor Culkin, Customer Compliance Group, H.M. Revenue and Customs. For services to Autism and Neurodiversity Awareness.
- Anthony Marc Cussen. For services to Charity and to the community in Plymouth, Devon.
- Zakaria Arif Dada. For services to the community in the London Borough of Merton during Covid-19.
- Albert Gordon John Dale. For services to the community in Edingale, Staffordshire.
- Sarah Elizabeth Dale, Director of Quality, Innovation and Collaboration, East Cheshire Hospice. For services to End of Life Care.
- Martyn James Davies, Care Home Manager, Urmston Manor. For services to Care Home Residents in Manchester.
- Peter Offord Davies, Reading Volunteer, Dean Valley Community Primary School, Bollington, Macclesfield. For services to Education.
- Carol Mary Davis. For services to the community in Herne and Broomfield, Kent.
- Vernon Rudolph Davis, Coach, Bridgefield Swimming Club. For services to Swimming in Liverpool.
- Senija Dedic. For services to the community in Battersea, London Borough of Wandsworth, particularly during Covid-19.
- Pauline Anne Dee. For services to the community in Wem, Shropshire.
- Peter Dempster. For services to Swimming and to the community in Clydebank.
- John Dennett, President, Italy Star Association. For voluntary service to Veterans.
- Michael Devenish, Chair, The Stevenage and North Herts Adventure Club. For services to Young People.
- Jean Devlin, Group Scout Leader, South Tyneside District. For services to Young People in South Tyneside and Sunderland.
- Alan Watt Digweed (Tweedy). For services to the Circus and to the community in Stroud, Gloucestershire.
- Zoey Tashi Colleen Dixon, Development Librarian, London Borough of Lambeth. For services to Public Libraries.
- Peter Anthony Dolan, Founder, Enda Dolan Foundation. For services to Justice and to Young People in Northern Ireland.
- Clare Amelia Donegan, Military Artist. For services to Art.
- Linda Doyle, Coordinator Summer Play Scheme at SMARTYS. For services to Children.
- Deirdre Drake, Founder, The Toy Appeal. For Charitable Services.
- Cicely Draper. For services to the community in Northwood, London Borough of Hillingdon.
- Karen Easton, Community Volunteer, Shefford Greenspace Conservation Group. For services to the community in Shefford, Bedfordshire.
- Philip Edge. For services to the community in East Harling, Norfolk.
- Jahswill Rohi Alexander Emmanuel, Founder, Multi-Ethnic Sports and Cultures Northern Ireland. For services to the community in Northern Ireland.
- Mark Clive Escott. For services to Education in the South West England.
- Yvonne Clare Evans, lately Parish Clerk, Marloes and St Brides Community Council. For voluntary services to the community in Pembrokeshire.
- Rosemary Ann Fairfax. For services to Portsmouth Cathedral and to the community in Portsmouth, Hampshire.
- Diana Ferguson, Administrative and Security Officer, Cabinet Office. For Public Service.
- Malcolm Ian William Finch, Forestry Machine Operator, Forestry England. For services to Forestry.
- Kenbert Sylvester Floyde, Founder and Chair, Brixton BMX Club. For services to Bicycle Motocross Racing and to the community in Brixton, London Borough of Lambeth.
- Amanda Foley, Childminder, Amanda's Childminding. For services to Early Years Education in Lincolnshire.
- Margaret Nancy Footner. For services to the community in Brampton, Cambridgeshire.
- David Richard Foster, Chief Executive Officer, Milton Keynes Parks Trust. For services to the Environment and to the community in Milton Keynes, Buckinghamshire.
- Richard Fox, Musical Director, Metropolitan Police Choir and Police Constable, Metropolitan Police Service. For services to Policing and to Music.
- Charlotte Victoria Francis, Head of Mathematics, St Catherine's Catholic School, Bexleyheath, Greater London and Chief Executive Officer, Biankha and Friends and Chief Executive Officer, Tutall Ltd. For services to Education.
- Leslie Sandra Francis, Sub Postmaster, Enham Alamein Post Office. For services to the Post Office and to the community in Enham Alamein, Hampshire.
- Rachael Louise Fraser, Registered Manager, Caring Connections Ltd. For services to Vulnerable People, particularly during Covid-19.
- Mary Rose French. For services to the community in the London Borough of Waltham Forest.
- Graham Arthur Furber. For services to Cricket, to Disability Sport and to the community in Shropshire.
- Angela Gabriel, Community Champion, Leeds in Bloom and lately Councillor, Leeds City Council. For services to the community in Leeds.
- Alan Christopher Garnsworthy, lately Community Library Services Manager, London Borough of Hackney. For services to Home Visit Libraries.
- Doris Margaret Garton (Bidge Garton), lately Volunteer, Brighton and Sussex University Hospitals NHS Trust. For services to Volunteering.
- Victoria Jane Geary, Beaver Scout Leader, 5th Kettering Scout Group. For services to Young People and to the community in Kettering, Northamptonshire.
- Michael Gee, Luthier. For services to Music.
- Jonathan Gilbey. For services to the community in Shanklin, Isle of Wight.
- Peter Gilham, Player Welfare Manager, Brentford Football Club. For services to Association Football and to the community in the London Borough of Hounslow.
- Mark Barnes Glossop. For services to the community in Worcester.
- Pamela Mary Jessie Goldsmith, Founder, Billinghurst Branch, Macmillan Cancer. For voluntary and charitable services in West Sussex.
- Mary Gollegde. For services to the community in Begbrook and Stapleton, Bristol.
- Debra Goodman. For voluntary service to the NHS during Covid-19.
- Christopher George Goodwin, Founder and Group Scout Leader, 2nd Deal Sea Scouts Cub Pack. For services to Scouting, to Young People and to Charity in Kent.
- Michelle Marcia Gordon, Co-Founder, Women's Institute Wanderers. For services to Women's Health in Greater London during Covid-19.
- Julie Gough. For services to Midwifery in Northern Ireland.
- Kathleen Elizabeth Gow. For charitable services in Clackmannanshire.
- Lynn Green. For services to Emergency Nursing in Northern Ireland.
- Derek Richard Greenaway. For services to Young People in Northern Ireland through The Boys' Brigade.
- Raye Elizabeth Greenaway. For services to Young People in Northern Ireland through The Boys' Brigade.
- Frances Mary Greenwell. For services to the community in Great Ayton, North Yorkshire.
- Reena Gudka, Senior Executive Officer, Department for Levelling Up Housing and Communities. For services to Civil Servants affected by Eating Disorders.
- Christopher Hall, Foster Carer, Birmingham Children's Trust. For services to Fostering.
- John Noah Hall. For services to the community in Cholsey, Oxfordshire, particularly during Covid-19.
- Richard Henry Hanley, Music Teacher, Thomas Mills High School, Framlingham, Suffolk. For services to Education.
- Paul Joseph Harry Wharton-Hardman, JP. For services to the community in Lancashire, particularly during Covid-19.
- Laura Harling, Founder and Artistic Director, The Dot Collective. For services to Professional Theatre in Care Homes and supporting People with Dementia.
- Valerie Ann Hart. For services to the community in Petersfield, Hampshire.
- Kathleen June Rosaline Harvey. For services to the community in Hall Green, West Midlands, particularly during Covid-19.
- Tom Michel Hatfield, Station Manager, Shropshire Fire and Rescue Service. For services to the Covid-19 response in Shropshire.
- Geoffrey Hawley, DL. For services to the community in Cheshire.
- John Hazel, Teacher, The Association for Latin Teaching. For services to Education.
- Lyn Head. For services to the community in Dudley, West Midlands.
- Shirley Anne Hearnshaw, Volunteer, New Whittington Community Primary School, Chesterfield, Derbyshire. For services to Education.
- Michael Heath. For services to the community in Tongham, Surrey.
- James Masaru Honda Hems. For services to the community in Cambridge, Cambridgeshire during Covid-19.
- Jacqueline Higginbottom. For services to the community in Deepcar, South Yorkshire.
- Rosemary Julia Higgs. For services to Charity and to the community in Little Missenden, Buckinghamshire.
- Rosslyn Hill, Occupational Health, Safety and Environment Adviser, Defence Equipment and Support, Ministry of Defence. For services to Defence and to Mental Health.
- Clare Hobbs, Founder, Wessex Dance Academy. For services to Young People in Hampshire.
- Louisa Claire Hobbs (Louisa Frost). For services to the community in Milton Keynes, Buckinghamshire during Covid-19.
- Derek John Hodge. For services to Association Football, to Charity and to the community in Sevenoaks and in Kent.
- Anne Holdsworth. For services to the community in Harrogate, North Yorkshire.
- Torkwase Holmes, Donor Ambassador and Outreach Officer, NHS Blood and Transplant. For services to Diversity in Blood Donation.
- John Patrick Holt, Committee Member, Bolton Olympic Wrestling Club. For services to Wrestling and to the community in Bolton.
- April Jane Homer. For services to the community in Snodland, Kent during Covid-19.
- Louenna Rose Hood, Fundraiser. For services to Refugees.
- Eric Hopes, Police Support Volunteer, Suffolk Constabulary. For services to Policing.
- Julia Hopkins. For services to the community in Woking, Surrey.
- Joanne Amy Horne. For services to the community in Stratford-upon-Avon, Warwickshire.
- Euryl Howells, Senior Chaplain, Hywel Dda University Health Board. For services to the Chaplaincy in NHS Wales.
- William John Hutchinson, Volunteer Driver, Belfast City Hospital. For services to Healthcare in Northern Ireland.
- Javaid Iqbal, Foster Carer, Birmingham Children's Trust. For services to Fostering.
- Samina Qasim Iqbal, Foster Carer, Birmingham Children's Trust. For services to Fostering.
- Shirley Irlam, Lunchtime Supervisor, Wistaston Academy, Cheshire. For services to Education.
- Brian Charles Jackson. For services to the community in Leicestershire.
- Tracy Jallow, Diary Manager, Corporate Finance Group, H.M. Revenue and Customs. For services to Volunteering.
- Gavin Hugh James, Philanthropist. For services to the community in Ledbury, Herefordshire, particularly during Covid-19.
- Kerry Ann James, Foster Carer, Plymouth City Council. For services to Fostering.
- Pamela Jane Jefferson. For services to the Women's Institute in Nottinghamshire.
- Patricia Lesley Johnson, Locality Officer, Cheshire West and Chester Council. For services to Local Government and to the community in Winsford, Cheshire.
- Catherine Georgina Johnston. For services to Save The Children and to the community in Belfast.
- Robert Johnston, Technical Services Manager, University of Warwick. For services to Physics.
- Elspeth Marion Jones, Table Officer, House of Lords. For services to Parliament.
- James Jones, Inspector and Armed Forces Champion, Greater Manchester Police. For services to Policing and to the Armed Forces.
- Lorna Jones, Committee Member, Croydon Schools Primary Netball Association. For services to Schools' Netball in the London Borough of Croydon.
- Patricia Anne Ward-Jones, Fundraiser, Promise Dreams. For charitable services to Terminally Ill Children and their Families.
- John St John Joseph (Johnathan Joseph) DJ Spoony, Disc Jockey. For services to Charities through Music during Covid-19.
- Carol Esme Keach. For services to the community in Barton Seagrave and Kettering, Northamptonshire.
- Diana Lesley Kelly. For services to the community in the Parish of Withyham, East Sussex.
- William Iain Kennedy, Director, Aisling Counselling Centre and Coach, Enniskillen Royal Boat Club. For voluntary service to the community in County Fermanagh.
- Dr. Beatrix Kate Margot Kenyon. For services to the community in the Royal Borough of Kingston-upon-Thames, particularly during Covid-19.
- Barbara Evelyn King, Group Scout Leader, Scout Activity Support Unit, 10th Chippenham Scout Group, Wiltshire. For services to Young People in Wiltshire.
- The Reverend Peter Duncan King, TD. For services to the Church and to the community in South London.
- The Reverend Innocent Nathan Kiyaga, Chair, Devon and Cornwall Community Scrutiny Panel, School Chaplain, St Cuthbert Mayne School and Area Dean, Church of England, Torbay. For services to the community in Devon and Cornwall.
- Sylvia Mary Knights, Trustee, Suffolk Libraries. For services to Public Libraries.
- Alison Jane Kohler, lately Director of Conservation and Communities, Dartmoor National Park. For services to Conservation in Devon.
- Lorraine Susan Lear, Development Manager, Northallerton and the Dales Mencap Society. For services to People with Learning Disabilities in North Yorkshire.
- Janet Leek. For services to the community in Shipham, Somerset.
- Dr. Julie Ann Leeming, Director of Planning, St George's University of London. For services to Higher Education.
- Anne Leese, Deputy Chief Executive Officer, EKC Group. For services to Education and to the community in East Kent.
- Kevin Richard Lincoln, Volunteer, Tottenham Community Sports Centre. For services to Sport and to the community in the London Borough of Haringey.
- John Philip Lord, Chair, Ribble Rivers Trust. For services to the Environment.
- Russell James Lord. For services to Charity in Essex.
- Jennifer Mary Lovatt. For services to the community in Swadlincote, Derbyshire.
- June Lesley Lovell, Psychiatric Nurse Manager. For services to Mental Health in North Wales.
- Richard William Lower. For services to the community in Buxton, Derbyshire.
- Edwin Luckin, Boathouse Manager, Cromer Lifeboat Station, Royal National Lifeboat Institution. For services to Maritime Safety.
- Geoffrey Andrew John Lymer. For services to the community in Dover, Kent.
- Bryan Lynch, Watch Manager, Lincolnshire Fire and Rescue Service. For services to the community in Lincolnshire.
- David Mackay, Operational Team Leader, British Red Cross. For voluntary service to the Red Cross in the West of Scotland.
- Kathleen Elizabeth Maclean (Kate Dickson), lately Trustee, Architectural Heritage Fund. For services to Heritage.
- George Peter Maddison. For services to the community in Louth, Lincolnshire.
- Liam Manton, Co-Founder, Didsbury Gin. For services to the community in Greater Manchester during Covid-19.
- Hilary Margaret Marshall. Treasurer, Association of Senior Children's and Educational Librarians. For services to Libraries.
- Paul Andrew Matson, Founder, Hull 4 Heroes. For services to Veterans and to Serving Armed Forces Personnel.
- Dr. Sayyada Mawji. For services to Healthcare during Covid-19.
- Susan Mayo. For services to the community in Wimbledon, London Borough of Merton.
- Dara Seamus McAnulty. For services to the Environment and to People with Autism Spectrum Disorder.
- James Michael McBride, Area Council Member, Herefordshire and Worcestershire Chamber of Commerce. For services to Businesses in Herefordshire and Worcestershire.
- Winifred McConnell, Registrar, Belfast City Council. For services to Local Government.
- James McDowell. For services to the community in Banbridge, County Down.
- Heather McKenna, Childminder, Tyne and Wear. For services to Early Years Education and to the community in Tyne and Wear.
- Patrick Joseph McTeague, Food Technology Technician, Department for Agriculture, Environment and Rural Affairs, Northern Ireland Executive. For Public and Voluntary Service.
- William John Mellersh, Head Coach, Chew Valley Badminton Club. For services to Badminton in Bristol.
- Julia Margaret Meredith. For services to the community in Budleigh Salterton, Exeter and East Devon.
- Lucy Mitchell. For services to the community in Golden Hill, Bristol.
- Kieron Moir, Scout Leader, Essex. For services to Young People.
- Kenneth Robbin Moore. For services to the communities in Titchfield and Warsash, Hampshire.
- Anthony Oliver Morrison. For voluntary services to the community in Northern Ireland.
- James McVicker Morrison. For services to Agriculture in Northern Ireland.
- Mark Coulston Hugh Mountjoy. For services to the community in Westerham, Kent.
- Michelle Veronica Mullan, Clerical Officer, School of Nursing and Midwifery, Queen's University Belfast. For voluntary and charitable service to the community in County Antrim.
- Siobhain Murphy, Co-founder, A Safe Space To Be Me. For services to the community in County Antrim.
- Joyce Murray, School Crossing Patrol Attendant. For service to the Boys' Brigade and to the community in Glasgow.
- Joan Musker. For services to the community in Leyland, Lancashire, particularly during Covid-19.
- David Muir Nesbit, JP. For services to Charity and to the community in Portsmouth, Hampshire.
- Michael Anthony Newman, Founder, Speed of Sight. For services to People with Disabilities including Visual Impairments.
- Peter Gordon Nicol, Chair of Governors, Bury College, Bury, Greater Manchester. For services to Education.
- Diana Violet O'Grady, For services to the community in Arreton, Isle of Wight
- Peter Barry Oxbrow, lately Visiting Officer, Department for Work and Pensions. For services to the community in High Wycombe, Buckinghamshire.
- Rudi Page, Chief Executive Officer, Making Connections Work. For services to the Windrush Generation.
- Angela Mary Painter, Chair, Sevenoaks District Voluntary Sector Forum and Trustee, Domestic Abuse Volunteer Support Services. For services to the Voluntary Sector in Kent.
- Kristan Megan Payne. For services to the community in Elstree and Borehamwood, Hertfordshire.
- Juliette Pearson, Lead, Digital Academy Services, Ministry of Defence. For services to Defence and to the community in Wiltshire.
- Wendy Elizabeth Pease, Vice-Chair, Newark and District Talking Newspaper for the Blind. For services to Visually Impaired People and to the community in Newark, Nottinghamshire.
- Alison Jean Peek, Co-Founder, Women's Institute Wanderers. For services to Women's Health in Greater Manchester during Covid-19.
- Albert John Evans Phillips. For services to Association Football and to Young People in South Wales.
- Enyojo Opaluwa-Pinheiro, Founder and Chair, Passenger Services BAME Network, Department for Transport. For services to Diversity and Inclusion.
- Ann Pinhey, Music Teacher and Conductor. For services to Music, to Choirs and to Charity.
- Stephen Porritt. For services to Young People and to the community in London.
- John Martin Procter. For services to the community in Farsley, West Yorkshire.
- David Ronald Quigg. For services to Police and Military Welfare in County Armagh.
- Janette Radford, Prison Officer, H.M. Prison The Verne, Portland, Dorset. For services to Prisoners and to AgeUK.
- Timothy John Rance, Production Manager, Penlon. For services to the Covid-19 response.
- Martin Frank Sydney Rayner, Volunteer Coastguard Rescue Officer, Isle of Wight. For services to Maritime Safety.
- Dr. Andrew David Raynsford, General Practitioner, Arwystli Medical Practice, Powys. For services to the NHS in Wales.
- Simon Mark Read. For services to the community in Pickmere, Cheshire.
- James Reed, Head of Crime Scene Investigation, Police Service of Northern Ireland. For services to Policing in Northern Ireland.
- Paula Marie Reid, Head, Business Management Team, Department for Work and Pensions. For Voluntary and Charitable Services, particularly during Covid-19.
- Fiona Mary Rennie, Chair, Event Management Group for Rowing, British University and Colleges Sports. For services to Rowing.
- Arthur Leonard Renshaw. For services to the community in Draycott-in-the-Clay, Staffordshire.
- Joan Rhodes. For services to the community in Kent during Covid-19.
- Nigel Trevor Rix. For services to the community in Clitheroe and the Ribble Valley, Lancashire.
- George Roberts. For services to the community in Washington, Tyne and Wear.
- Sandra Roscoe. For voluntary and charitable services to the community in Rainhill and St Helens, Merseyside during Covid-19.
- Andrew George Samuel. For services to the community in Somerset, particularly during Covid-19.
- William David Sargent, Support Services Coordinator, The Open University. For services to Higher Education and to Charity.
- Ian Christopher Satherley, Secretary and Treasurer, Avon Fire and Rescue Service Pensioners Association. For Voluntary and Charitable Service.
- Zoe Elizabeth Sayers. For services to the community in Kent during Covid-19.
- Keith Leonard Schnaar, Museum Guide and National Fellowship Volunteer, Order of St John. For voluntary service to St John Ambulance in London.
- David William Scott. For services to Countryside Conservation and to Heritage.
- Neil Shonchhatra. For services to the Covid-19 Response.
- Douglas Shorter, Scout Leader and Member, 11th Nuneaton (Weddington) Scout Group Trustee Committee. For services to Young People in Warwickshire.
- Gabrielle Anne Skipper, Chair, Watton Thursday Club. For services to the community in Watton, Norfolk.
- Mark Smallwood, Co-Founder, Didsbury Gin. For services to the community in Greater Manchester during Covid-19.
- Jessie Smith, Writer. For services to the Scottish Traveller Community.
- Lucy Elizabeth Smith (Lucy Lintott). For voluntary services to Motor Neurone Disease Research.
- Lieutenant Colonel (Rtd.) Mark Smith. For services to the community in Hereford during Covid-19.
- Teresa Josephine Smith. For services to Thalidomide Patients and Research in Merseyside.
- Iris Smyth, lately Senior Telephonist, Northern Health and Social Care Trust. For services to Healthcare in Northern Ireland.
- Amarjit Singh Soora. For services to the community in Ilford, London Borough of Redbridge.
- Jagraj Singh Sran. For services to Charitable Fundraising and to the community in Cranford, London Borough of Hounslow.
- Kevin Martyn Stark, Chief Executive Officer, Bedford Training Group. For services to Young People, to Martial Arts and to the community in Bedfordshire.
- Bethan Louise Stimpson, lately Head of Legacy, Birmingham 2022. For services to Young People.
- Christopher Storey, Organiser and Teacher, Pan Nation. For services to Steel Pan Music and to the community in Tottenham, Greater London.
- Alban Stowe, Senior Head, UK Government Strategy and Partnerships, The Prince's Trust. For services to Young People.
- Jack Summers, lately Health and Wellbeing Lead, Home Office. For services to Mental Health and Wellbeing.
- Loraine Swan. For services to the community in Lanark.
- Gloria Swanston, Foster Carer, Hertfordshire County Council. For services to Fostering.
- Ian Francis Swinney, Countryside Area Ranger, Bookham Commons. For services to Conservation and Heritage in Surrey.
- Carolyn Tailford, Co-Founder, A Safe Space To Be Me. For services to the community in County Antrim.
- Joan Mary Taylor. For services to the community in the London Borough of Wandsworth.
- Nancy Thomas, Bank Nurse, Aneurin Bevan University Health Board. For services to the NHS in Wales.
- William Michael Thornton. For services to the community in Docklands, London.
- Erica Joan Tipton. For services to Charity and to the community in Newbury, Berkshire.
- Jonathan Gordon Topping, General Manager, Clayton Hotel, Belfast. For services to the Covid-19 Response.
- Ian Richard Toulson. For services to the community in Walsham-le-Willows, Suffolk.
- The Reverend Canon David Alan Twinley. For services to the community in Arundel, West Sussex, particularly during Covid-19.
- Kay Tyler. For services to the community in Horsham, West Sussex.
- Peter Giosuè Vannucci, Vice-President, Bangor Football Club. For services to Association Football in County Down.
- Victoria Wales, lately Operations Manager, Duke of Edinburgh Awards. For services to Young People.
- David Ward, Sub Postmaster, East Barkwith Post Office. For services to the Post Office and to the community in East Barkwith, Lincolnshire.
- Coral Theodora Warren. For voluntary and charitable services to Sport Action for Women with or after Cancer in Norwich, Norfolk.
- Molly Watts, Writer. For services to Literature during Covid-19.
- Margaret Webster. For services to the community in Scholes, Cleckheaton, West Yorkshire.
- Michael Arthur Weeks, Operations Manager, Cornwall Cricket League. For services to Cricket in Cornwall.
- Susan Julie Wellfare. For services to the community in Lancing, West Sussex.
- Ian Gerard Westworth, Senior Clock Mechanic, Houses of Parliament. For services to Parliament.
- Hayley Jane Wheeler, Global Student Support and Events Coordinator, University of Portsmouth. For services to Higher Education.
- Denise Margaret Ann Whiffin, Founder, J's Hospice. For services to Young People.
- Helena Mary White, County President, Girlguiding North Down. For services to Young People in Northern Ireland.
- Marilyn Jane Whitehead (Marie Whitehead). For services to the community in Dawlish, Devon.
- Rosalie Caroline Whitlock, Fundraising Secretary, Penlee Lifeboat Station, Royal National Lifeboat Institution. For services to Maritime Safety.
- Janet Ann Wigglesworth, Personal Assistant to the Chief Executive, Chartered Institution of Building Services Engineers. For services to Business.
- Louise Margaret Wilders. For services to the community in Portsmouth, Hampshire during Covid-19.
- Alan John Richard Williams. For services to the community in Edlesborough, Bedfordshire.
- Edwin John Williams. For services to Conservation and to the community in Rutland.
- Elizabeth Cassidy Wilson (Lysabeth Wilson). For services to Handbell Ringing.
- Stephen Andrew Windsor, lately Border Force Officer, Home Office. For Public Service.
- Alison June Wolfe, Senior Personal Secretary, Labour Relations Agency. For services to Employment Relations in Northern Ireland.
- Brian John Woodward, Councillor, Maulden Parish Council, Bedfordshire. For services to Local Government and to the community in Bedfordshire.
- Christopher Wooldridge. For services to the community in York.
- The Reverend Jason Young, Writer and Director. For services to Cultural Heritage and Public Awareness of Black British History through the Creative Arts.

=== King's Police Medal (KPM) ===
Ribbon bar of the King's Police Medal for Distinguished Service

- Emma Elizabeth Barnett, Deputy Chief Constable, Staffordshire Police.
- Phillip Mark Cain, lately Deputy Chief Constable, North Yorkshire Police.
- Paul Anthony Costello, Sergeant, Merseyside Police.
- Russell Foster, Deputy Chief Constable, West Yorkshire Police.
- Lee Freeman, Chief Constable, Humberside Police.
- Paul Griffiths, Detective Sergeant, Metropolitan Police Service.
- Jason Michael Harwin, lately Deputy Chief Constable, Lincolnshire Police.
- Helene Miller, Detective Inspector, Metropolitan Police Service.
- James Donnelly Morrison, lately Detective Constable, Metropolitan Police Service.
- Claire Elizabeth Moxon, lately Detective Superintendent, Metropolitan Police Service.
- Daniel Patrick Murphy, Chief Superintendent, Kent Police.
- Nicola Owen, Detective Inspector, Metropolitan Police Service.
- Brian Vincent Power, Detective Sergeant, British Transport Police.
- Neil Pudney, Detective Superintendent, Essex Police.
- Andrea Susan Diane Reynolds, lately Constable, West Midlands Police.
- Lynette Elizabeth Shanks, lately Chief Superintendent, Surrey Police.
- Kelvin Victor Shipp, lately Inspector, Hampshire Constabulary.
- Tina Wallace, Detective Inspector, Thames Valley Police.
- William James Kerr, OBE, Deputy Chief Constable, Police Service of Scotland.
- Sharon Louise Milton, Chief Superintendent, Police Service of Scotland.
- Sean Scott, Chief Superintendent, Police Service of Scotland.
- John Bannon, Constable, Police Service of Northern Ireland.
- Lindsay Leanne Fisher, Detective Superintendent, Police Service of Northern Ireland.
- Alan Todd, Assistant Chief Constable, Police Service of Northern Ireland.

=== King's Fire Service Medal (KFSM) ===
Ribbon bar of the King's Fire Service Medal for Distinguished Service

- Darren William Dovey, lately Chief Fire Officer, Northamptonshire Fire and Rescue Service.
- Derek James, Deputy Chief Fire Officer, Dorset and Wiltshire Fire and Rescue Service.
- Christopher James Kemp, Senior Fire Protection Manager, West Yorkshire Fire and Rescue Service.
- John Roberts, Chief Fire Officer, West Yorkshire Fire and Rescue Service.
- Dawn Elaine Whittaker, Chief Fire Officer, East Sussex Fire and Rescue Service.
- Alan Alexander Aitken, Watch Commander, Scottish Fire and Rescue Service.
- Robert Strang, Volunteer Leader, Scottish Fire and Rescue Service.

=== King's Ambulance Service Medal (KAM) ===
Ribbon bar of the King's Ambulance Service Medal

- Salman Desai, Deputy Chief Executive Officer and Director of Strategy, Partnerships and Transformation, North West Ambulance Service
- Nigel John Flanagan, Paramedic, London Ambulance Service
- Edward Michael Rhodri O'Brian, Clinical Lead Palliative and End of Life Care, Welsh Ambulance Service
- Wendy Bathgate, Information Governance Officer and Trustee of the Benevolent Fund, Scottish Ambulance Service.

=== King's Volunteer Reserves Medal (KVRM) ===
Ribbon bar of the King's Volunteer Reserves Medal

- Warrant Officer 2 Andrew Charles Carmichael, Royal Marines Reserve
- Brigadier Simon Robert Goldstein, MBE VR, Army Reserve
- Major Gary Leslie Strain, VR, The Royal Irish Regiment, Army Reserve
- Captain Colin Alexander McDonald, VR, Royal Regiment of Artillery, Army Reserve
- Staff Sergeant Paul Edward Hilton, VR, The Royal Wessex Yeomanry, Army Reserve
- Squadron Leader Mary Bernadette O'Neill

=== Overseas Territories Police Medal (OTPM) ===
Ribbon bar of the Overseas Territories Police Medal

- Maria Atalioti, Chief Inspector, Sovereign Base Areas Police, Cyprus. For services to Policing, Diversity and Inclusion in the Sovereign Base Areas.
- Elliott Forbes, Deputy Commissioner, Royal Anguilla Police Force. For services to Policing in Anguilla.

=== Meritorious Service Medal ===
Ribbon bar of the Meritorious Service Medal

Warrant Officer Class Two A Abdulrahman, Royal Electrical and Mechanical Engineers

Warrant Officer Class Two G Barnes, Parachute Regiment

Warrant Officer Class Two I P Barrett, Parachute Regiment

Staff Sergeant T J Bartlett, Royal Corps of Signals

Warrant Officer Class One J D Bennett, Grenadier Guards

Warrant Officer Class Two M Braithwaite, The Light Dragoons

Warrant Officer Class One S J Chalmers, Royal Logistic Corps

Warrant Officer Class One D Chant, 1st The Queen's Dragoon Guards

Warrant Officer Class One D A Coombs, Adjutant General's Corps (Royal Military Police)

Warrant Officer Class One (now Warrant Officer Class Two) C M Cooper, Adjutant General's Corps (Staff and Personnel Support Branch) (now Army Reserve)

Warrant Officer Class One R L A Edwards, Princess of Wales's Royal Regiment

Warrant Officer Class One (now Captain) B K Green, Royal Regiment of Artillery

Warrant Officer Class One B Gurung, Royal Gurkha Rifles

Warrant Officer Class One G W Hannah, Royal Regiment of Scotland

Warrant Officer Class Two J L Hartland, Queen's Royal Hussars

Warrant Officer Class One P L Henderson, Adjutant General's Corps (Staff and Personnel Support Branch)

Warrant Officer Class Two K A Holland, Royal Electrical and Mechanical Engineers

Warrant Officer Class Two J D Hopkin, Royal Logistic Corps

Warrant Officer Class One M L J Kovacs, Army Air Corps

Warrant Officer Class One I Lamming, The Rifles

Warrant Officer Class One M D Lindsay, Royal Electrical and Mechanical Engineers

Warrant Officer Class One S J Lingwood, Royal Army Physical Training Corps

Warrant Officer Class One (now Captain) M Lynch, Royal Electrical and Mechanical Engineers

Warrant Officer Class One P MacGregor, Royal Regiment of Scotland

Staff Sergeant (now Acting Warrant Officer Class Two) J Machin, Royal Corps of Signals

Warrant Officer Class One Thomas S McComiskie, Royal Logistic Corps

Warrant Officer Class One A R McLellan, Royal Regiment of Scotland

Warrant Officer Class Two P W Morey, Royal Electrical and Mechanical Engineers

Warrant Officer Class One (now Captain) A M Murrell, Royal Electrical and Mechanical Engineers

Warrant Officer Class Two N N Nakalevu, Ranger Regiment

Warrant Officer Class Two R S Pantrey, Royal Corps of Army Music

Warrant Officer Class Two (now Acting Warrant Officer Class One) W N Petersen, Ranger Regiment

Warrant Officer Class Two W R, Royal Logistic Corps

Warrant Officer Class Two K L Robertson, Adjutant General's Corps (Staff and Personnel Support Branch)

Warrant Officer Class One (now Captain) R S, Grenadier Guards

Warrant Officer Class One M Skinner, Parachute Regiment

Warrant Officer Class One C R Smith, Royal Corps of Signals

Captain C Sutherland, Royal Logistic Corps

Warrant Officer Class Two J Tamang, Royal Gurkha Rifles

Warrant Officer Class One M S J Thompson, Corps of Royal Engineers

Warrant Officer Class Two C S Thomson-Hay, Royal Electrical and Mechanical Engineers

Warrant Officer Class One J Walker, Royal Logistic Corps

Warrant Officer Class One L S C Welden, Adjutant General's Corps (Royal Military Police)

Acting Warrant Officer Class Two P J Williams, Royal Army Medical Corps

- Lt S E Ashdown RN
- Lt M Evans RN
- WO P A Bedson
- WO L Calvert
- WO K Charlton
- WO1 N Copeland RN
- WO1 J A Crawford RN
- WO J Devlin
- WO J I Dick
- WO M W Elsbury
- MAcr C S Fairbrother
- WO1 M Farr MBE RN
- WO1 N Frost RN
- MAcr D M Gall
- WO1 S A Hall RM
- WO S L Hammond
- WO1 D B Hamp RN
- WO M L Heaton
- WO1 L B Hendrickson RN
- WO T A Hennells
- WO M L Henriques
- WO1 J A Houghton RN
- WO I M Jenkins
- WO L A Lawrence
- WO G P Longley
- MAcr S Macdonald
- WO N A Mackie
- WO1 B Martin RN
- WO1 L Paterson RN
- WO1 S Payne RM
- WO S G Peers
- WO1 J Preece RN
- WO1 W Rees RM
- WO G Scott
- WO D P Screeton
- WO N M Thomas
- MAcr S J Tomlinson
- WO J Tomlinson-Smale
- WO P M Uglow
- WO1 C Wheeler MBE RN
- WO1 S Yeates RN
- WO2 J J B Kemp MBE RM
- SSgt T J Bartlett
- CPO T J Clifton RN
- FS A J Fairlamb
- CPO G Hunter RN
- FS G Mulholland
- FS L Ramm
- CPO M Shepley RN
- CPO L Wrightson RN
- Petty Officer Catering Service (Submarines) M Trotter RN

== Overseas and International ==
=== The Most Excellent Order of the British Empire ===
==== Officer of the Order of the British Empire (OBE) ====
- James Michael Alexandroff, Founder and Trustee, The Perivoli Foundation. For services to Education in Africa.
- Athenee Juanquisha Harvey-Basden, Permanent Secretary, Finance, Turks and Caicos Islands. For services to the Economy in the Turks and Caicos Islands.
- Simon Berry, Chief Executive Officer and Co-Founder, ColaLife and Startup Catalyst, ORSZCA. For services to global Child Health.
- James Graham Alan Booth, former Country Director Afghanistan, British Council. For services to UK/Afghanistan cultural relations.
- Paolo Cesare Coniglio, Secretary General, Church of England Association in Italy. For services to the Church of England in Italy.
- Sheelagh Ann Cooper, Chair, Habitat for Humanity, Bermuda. For services to the community in Bermuda.
- Professor Nigel Andrew Cunliffe, Professor of Medical Microbiology, University of Liverpool and Alder Hey Children's NHS Foundation Trust. For services to Infectious Disease and Vaccine research.
- Katherine Anne Davenport, Political Counsellor, British Embassy Kyiv, Ukraine. For services to British foreign policy.
- Sarah Elaine Docherty, lately Head of Chancery, British Embassy Moscow, Russia. For services to British foreign policy.
- Daniel Drake, Deputy Director, Sanctions Taskforce, Foreign, Commonwealth and Development Office. For services to British foreign policy.
- Fergus John Drake, Chief Executive Officer, Crown Agents. For services to UK/Ukraine relations in the Health sector.
- Kelly Jane Evans, LVO, Head of Casework and Management Advice Team, Foreign, Commonwealth and Development Office. For services to British foreign policy.
- Neil Russell Feinson, Deputy Director, Trade in Goods, Department for International Trade. For services to International Trade and Diversity.
- Daniel James Fertig, Partner, Samil PricewaterhouseCoopers, Seoul, The Republic of Korea. For services to UK business and cultural relations in The Republic of Korea.
- Matthew Robert Field, lately H.M. Ambassador Sarajevo, Bosnia and Herzegovina. For services to British foreign policy.
- Nicholas David Godfrey, Director, Examination Services China, British Council. For services to UK/China cultural and educational relations.
- Nicolas James Laurent Harrocks, Deputy Head of Mission, British Embassy Kyiv, Ukraine. For services to British foreign policy.
- Lieutenant Colonel (Rtd.) James Philip Holmes, Chief Executive Officer, Pipal Tree. For services to Vulnerable People in Nepal.
- Professor Rachel Jenkins, Professor Emeritus of Epidemiology and Mental Health Policy, King's College London. For services to Mental Health policy and research in the UK and overseas.
- Hua Jiang, former Director of News and Media, United Nations, New York, United States of America. For services to International Communications.
- Lieutenant Colonel (Rtd.) Andrew William Kent, Trauma and Orthopaedic Surgeon, Raigmore Hospital, Inverness, Scotland. For services to UK health support overseas, particularly in Ukraine, and during the Covid-19 pandemic.
- Elizabeth Rachel Kessler, Humanitarian Adviser. For services to the UK's humanitarian response in Ukraine.
- Patricia Kinane, President Entertainment Programs, FremantleMedia North America, Los Angeles, United States of America. For services to Broadcasting and to the International Television Format industry.
- Michael Anthony Lawrence, Chief Executive Officer, Asia House. For services to UK international relations in Asia.
- Professor David George Lewis, Professor, Politics Department, University of Exeter. For services to the development of UK Government policy in Eastern Europe and Russia.
- Desiree Lornette Lewis, Permanent Secretary, Health, Turks and Caicos Islands. For services to Health in the Turks and Caicos Islands.
- Professor Lesley Lokko, Founder and Director, Africa Futures Institute, Accra, Ghana. For services to Architecture and to Education.
- Matthew John Lownds, lately Sanctions Officer, Russia Unit, Eastern Europe and Central Asia Directorate, Foreign, Commonwealth and Development Office. For services to British foreign policy.
- Thomas Murdoch, Deputy Director, Foreign, Commonwealth and Development Office. For services to British foreign policy.
- Rosie Whittaker-Myles, Attorney-at-Law, RWM Chambers, Cayman Islands. For services to the community in the Cayman Islands.
- Dr Lindsay Porter, Vice Chair of the Scientific Committee, UK delegation to the International Whaling Commission. For services to Marine Life conservation.
- Gregory David Power, Founder and Board Chair, Global Partners Governance. For services to Parliamentary Democracy, to Political Reform and to UK interests overseas.
- Dr Paul Alan Ransom, Consultant in Emergency Medicine, Royal Sussex County Hospital, Brighton, East Sussex. For services to UK health support overseas, particularly in Ukraine, and during the Covid-19 pandemic.
- Ilaria Regondi, Acting H.M. Trade Commissioner to Europe and Country Director France, Department for International Trade, British Embassy Paris. For services to Trade and Investment in Europe.
- David James Riley, lately Deputy Director, Eastern Europe and Central Asia Directorate, Foreign, Commonwealth and Development Office. For services to British foreign policy.
- Sonashah Shivdasani, Founder and Chief Executive Officer, Soneva and Founder, Six Senses. For services to Tourism, to Sustainability and to Charity.
- Michael Clive Franklyn Smith, Founder, Ear Aid Nepal; Head of Service and Chief Surgeon, Ear Care Centre Hospital, Pokhara, Nepal. For services to Deaf and Vulnerable People in Nepal.
- Rosemarie Suissa, Senior Executive Officer, Gibraltar Health Authority, Gibraltar. For services to the Gibraltar Health Authority.
- Sally Anne Thompson, MBE, former Executive Director, The Border Consortium. For services to humanitarian assistance on the Thailand/Myanmar border.
- Martin Thursfield, Deputy Director, Foreign, Commonwealth and Development Office. For services to British foreign policy.
- Henry Thomas Deason Timms, President and Chief Executive Officer, Lincoln Center for the Performing Arts, New York, United States of America. For services to the Arts and to Philanthropy.
- Peter Hugh Walter, Employment Law Adviser, Human Resources Directorate, Foreign, Commonwealth and Development Office. For services to British foreign policy.
- Thomas Charles Williams, Director, Legs4Africa. For services to disabled people in Africa and to the Environment.
- Robert Huw Yardley, Deputy Director, Foreign, Commonwealth and Development Office. For services to British foreign policy.

==== Member of the Order of the British Empire (MBE) ====
- Felipe Alviar-Baquero, Trustee and Fundraiser, Children Change Colombia. For services to Charity and to Vulnerable People in Colombia.
- Dr Edward Alexander Barnett, Deputy Head of Mission, British Embassy, Mogadishu, Somalia and lately Head, Humanitarian Response Group, Humanitarian and Migration Directorate, Foreign, Commonwealth and Development Office. For services to UK humanitarian response.
- Vineet Bhatia, Chef. For services to UK Cuisine, to Hospitality and to International Trade.
- Rosalind Bluestone, Founder and Chief Executive Officer, Goods for Good. For services to Humanitarian Aid in the UK and overseas.
- Paula Boast, Vice Chair, Bahrain British Business Forum, Bahrain. For services to UK/Bahrain business relations.
- Patricia Brumage, Retired Teacher and School Governor. For services to Education in Tanzania.
- Peter Francis Candler, Deputy Head, Iran Unit, Foreign, Commonwealth and Development Office. For services to British foreign policy.
- David John Carter, Global Head of Counter Fraud, British Council. For services to Countering Fraud & Corruption in the UK and overseas.
- Terence Leonard Kerslake Childs, Founding Member and Chairman, Braeburn Schools Ltd., Nairobi, Kenya. For services to Education and to the wider community in Kenya and Tanzania.
- Stuart James Connick, Head, Sanctions Strategy and Capability, Sanctions Directorate, Foreign, Commonwealth and Development Office. For services to British foreign policy.
- Dr Vincent Liddiard Cook, Chief Executive Officer, National Bank of Fujairah, Dubai, United Arab Emirates. For services to UK/UAE business relations and the British Community in Dubai.
- Beverley Olwyn Corbett, Trustee, Noah's Ark and Community Volunteer, Tenerife, Spain. For services to British Nationals in Spain.
- Naomi Dee Cowan, Head of Climate Change and Energy, British Embassy Tokyo, Japan. For services to UK/Japan collaboration on Climate Change.
- Jacqueline Louise Daley, Head, Thematic Policy and Casework, Consular Assistance Department, Foreign, Commonwealth and Development Office. For services to British Nationals overseas.
- Daniel Andrew D'Amato, Director, Gibraltar House, Brussels; Member of the Brexit Strategic Group. For services to H.M. Government of Gibraltar.
- Philip Giles Daubeny, Vice Chairman, Dogs Trust and Dogs Trust Worldwide. For services to Animal Welfare in the UK and overseas.
- Elizabeth Sarah Davies, Founder and Trustee, Mexican Disabled Children's Trust. For services to Vulnerable and Disabled Children in Mexico.
- Thomas Adam Elphick, Desk Officer, Foreign, Commonwealth and Development Office. For services to British foreign policy.
- Keith Fossey, Chair, Operations Manager and Trustee, Swaziland Schools' Projects. For services to Education in Eswatini.
- Jeremy Francis Gilley, Actor, filmmaker; founder of Peace One Day. For services to Global Peace.
- James Patrick Glass, Chief Islander, Tristan da Cunha. For services to the Marine Environment and to the island of Tristan da Cunha.
- Sylvia Pauline Goodall, Founder and Patron, The Mud House Children's Foundation, Tanzania. For services to Education in Tanzania.
- Edmund John Hack, Overseas Security Adviser, Foreign, Commonwealth and Development Office. For services to the security and safety of UK staff and their families overseas.
- Lynette Lucia Harrigan, Marketing Manager, British Virgin Islands Tourist Board; former President, Rotary Club of Tortola, British Virgin Islands. For services to International Travel during the Covid-19 pandemic and to the community in the British Virgin Islands.
- Jeremy John Harris, Desk Officer, Foreign, Commonwealth and Development Office. For services to British foreign policy.
- Alvin Randolph Harvey, lately Adjutant, Royal Bermuda Regiment; Women's Coach and Referee, Bermuda Rugby Football Union, Bermuda. For services to the community in Bermuda.
- Andrew James Hill, Team Leader, Office for Conflict, Stabilisation and Mediation, Foreign, Commonwealth and Development Office. For services to International Development.
- Faraz Khan, Founder and Director, Social, Entrepreneurship and Equity Development SEEDVentures. For services to UK/Pakistan relations.
- Dr Joanne Lawson, Head of Procurement Trade Policy, Department for International Trade. For services to International Trade and Investment.
- Jennifer Margaret Lewis, Volunteer Manager, Primary School Libraries project in Uganda, Africa Education Trust. For services to Education in Uganda.
- Dr Lucy Alison Jane Lord, Co-Founder, Patient Care Foundation; Co-Founder and Executive Chair, Mind Hong Kong. For services to Health in Hong Kong.
- Nicholas Paul Marx, Director, Wildlife Rescue and Care, Wildlife Alliance, Cambodia. For services to the protection of wildlife and to conservation in Cambodia.
- Russell Grant Ogden, Lead Designer and Test Pilot, Ozone Paragliding; Paragliding World Champion 2021/2022. For services to Paragliding.
- Thomas Miles Oppenheim, lately Head of Press, Public Affairs and Projects, British Embassy Moscow, Russia. For services to British foreign policy.
- Timothy Charles Phillips, Principal Consultant, Teacher Development, British Council. For services to International English language education.
- Noreen Patricia Riols, British novelist; former Member, The Special Operations Executive. For services to UK/France relations and World War II education.
- Jeremy Terrence Roberts, ICT Section Manager/Equiano Project Manager, St Helena Government. For services to Information and Communications Technology and to the community in St. Helena.
- Mari-Louise Gordon-Roe, lately Office Manager, Royal Commonwealth Ex-Services League. For services to Commonwealth ex-service men and women.
- Sheila Rani Seewooruttun, Desk Officer, Foreign, Commonwealth and Development Office. For services to British foreign policy.
- Mohammed Shokat, Consular Regional Director Middle East, and North Africa, and South Asia, British Embassy Dubai, United Arab Emirates. For services to British Nationals overseas.
- Benjamin Taylor Snowdon, lately Deputy Head of Mission, British High Commission Kigali, Rwanda. For services to British foreign policy.
- Mark Daniel Stewart Steadman, Chief Operating Officer and Co-Founder, Lone Buffalo, Laos. For services to Youth Development in Laos.
- Peter Marshall Sweeney, Chief Technology Officer, Foreign, Commonwealth and Development Office. For services to Technology in H.M. Government.
- Anthony Bruce Tanner, Team Leader, Foreign, Commonwealth and Development Office. For services to British foreign policy.
- John More Thompson, Chief Executive Officer and Board Member, Masiphumelele Corporation, Western Cape, South Africa. For services to the Masiphumelele settlement in the Western Cape, South Africa.
- Martin Roy Tilbury, Founder and Chief Executive Officer, The Bumba Foundation, Uganda. For services to Charity and to Community Development in Uganda and to the Red Cross in the UK.
- Dr Helen Ann Boreland-Vinas, Research Analyst, Europe Directorate, Foreign, Commonwealth and Development Office. For services to British foreign policy.
- David John Glen Wardrop, Chair, United Nations Association, London. For services to the United Nations and its institutions.
- Gregory John Watkins, Executive Director, British Chamber of Commerce, Thailand. For services to British Nationals in Thailand during the Covid-19 pandemic.
- Jordan Wylie, British Adventurer, Author, Television Personality and former Soldier. For services to Charity and to Education in the UK and overseas.
- Marcia Doreen Zondervan, VISION 2020 LINKS Programme Manager and Assistant Professor, International Centre for Eye Health, London School of Hygiene and Tropical Medicine. For services to the prevention of blindness overseas.

=== British Empire Medal (BEM) ===
- Albert Steven Mark Burchmore, Post Security Manager, British Embassy Stockholm, Sweden. For services to Security at the British Embassy in Stockholm.
- Anne-Claire Marie Therese Deseilligny, Political Officer, British Embassy Paris, France. For services to commemorations in France.
- Colm Bernard Flanagan, Head of School, Seoul Foreign School, The Republic of Korea. For services to Education, to Charity and to Cultural Relations overseas.
- Antony William Franklin, Head Chef, Wilton Park. For services to British Diplomacy.
- Russell David Griffiths, retired Commercial Insurance Underwriter; Voluntary Insurance Advisor. For services to Small Businesses during the Covid-19 pandemic.
- Judith Rosemary Gumbs, Nurse and Founder, Just Tender Care Senior Citizens Home, Anguilla. For services to Senior Citizens in Anguilla.
- Mark Hopcraft, Desk Officer, Foreign, Commonwealth and Development Office. For services to British foreign policy.
- Susan Elizabeth Horrocks, Director and Conductor, the Cayman National Choir; Founder and Director, the Cayman National Orchestra, Cayman Islands. For services to the Arts in the Cayman Islands.
- Reina Jefferson, Public Relations Officer, Founding Member and former President, the Cayman Islands Early Childhood Association, Cayman Islands. For services to Literacy and Education in the Cayman Islands.
- John William Lawton, BEM (Mil.), Manager, the Episkopi Station Running and Walking Club, Cyprus. For services to Charity and to the community in Cyprus.
- Nigel Guy Thornton Linacre, Co-Founder and Chair of the Board of Trustees, WellBoring. For services to Water Provision in communities in Kenya and other countries in Africa.
- Christopher Lock, Founder, the Tank Memorial Ypres Salient Group, Belgium. For services to the commemoration of British Servicemen and UK/Belgium relations.
- Michele Lindsey Masson, President, HELP Vega Baja, Alicante, Spain. For services to British Nationals in Spain.
- Louis Mignot, lately Iran Desk Officer, Foreign, Commonwealth and Development Office. For services to British foreign policy.
- Claira Range, Deputy Director, Fairbanks Women's Prison, H.M. Cayman Island Prison Service; Director, Eagle House Rehabilitation Centre, Cayman Islands. For services to the Prison Service and to the wider community in the Cayman Islands.
- Ewan Robert Reekie, Chieftain, The Bahrain Caledonian Society Awali. For services to the British Community in Bahrain.
- Robert Andrew Schofield, Senior UK Overseas Territories Officer, Royal Society for the Protection of Birds. For services to the Environment and to the community in Tristan da Cunha.
- Edward James Robert Sparrow, Second Secretary, British Embassy Tehran, Iran. For services to British foreign policy and economic relations.
- Michael Joseph Trott, Director, Living Life Eastbourne. For services to Humanitarian Aid and support for communities in the UK and abroad.
- Anna Isabell Turner, lately Business Support Manager, Strategic Finance and Official Development Assistance Management Department, Foreign, Commonwealth and Development Office. For services to International Development.
- Christopher Ian Woodrow, Chairman, The British Club, Bahrain. For services to the British Community in Bahrain.
- Jill Cassandra Yule, Desk Officer, Foreign, Commonwealth and Development Office. For services to British foreign policy

== Crown Dependencies ==
=== The Most Excellent Order of the British Empire ===
==== Member of the Order of the British Empire (MBE) ====
Isle of Man

- Patricia Adrienne Burnett. For outstanding services to Education, to Arts and to Culture.
- Susan Margaret Moore. For exceptional services to and leadership in Education on the Isle of Man.

Guernsey

- Lucy Kate Beere. For services to Bowls on Guernsey.

Jersey

- Susan Jane Little, Founder and Chairperson, Jersey Brain Tumour Charity. For services to the Community.
- Sara McIntosh, Founder and Chairperson, Jersey Action Against Rape. For services to the Community.

=== British Empire Medal (BEM) ===
Isle of Man

- Andrew Allan Scarffe. For services to the preservation of Laxey and Lonan Heritage and the Isle of Man Railways.

Guernsey

- Roy Henry Bisson. For services to the community on Guernsey.

Jersey

- Anthony Francis Allchurch, Chairman, Jersey Fairtrade Island Group. For services to the Community.

== The Bahamas ==
Below are the individuals appointed by Charles III in his right as King of The Bahamas, on advice of His Majesty's Bahamas Ministers.

=== Knight Bachelor ===
- The Honourable Mr. Justice Ian R. Winder, Chief Justice, The Bahamas.

=== The Most Distinguished Order of Saint Michael and Saint George ===
==== Companion of the Order of St Michael and St George (CMG) ====
- Nathaniel Gifford Beneby. For services to Business and to Religion.

=== The Most Excellent Order of the British Empire ===
==== Officer of the Order of the British Empire (OBE) ====
- Leslie Alexander Bowe. For services to Business and to the Community.

=== King's Police Medal (KPM) ===
- Emrick Kevin Seymour. For services to the Royal Bahamas Police Force.

== Bermuda ==
His Majesty The King, Charles III, has recognised the following individuals in his annual 2023 New Year's Honours List:

=== Order of the British Empire ===
==== Officer of the Order of the British Empire (OBE) ====
- Sheelagh Cooper – for services to the community of Bermuda

==== Member of the Order of the British Empire (MBE) ====
- Captain Alvin Harvey – for his services to the community in Bermuda.

=== King's Certificates and Badges of Honour ===
- Dr. Myra Virgil – for services to the charitable sector.
- Leon "Sparky" Place – for services to culture and the preservation of Bermuda's Gombey Tradition.
- Linda Fox-Tailford – for services to scouting in Bermuda.

== Solomon Islands ==
Below are the individuals appointed by Charles III in his right as King of the Solomon Islands, on advice of His Majesty's Solomon Islands Ministers.

=== The Most Excellent Order of the British Empire ===
==== Officer of the Order of the British Empire (OBE) ====
- Walton Naezon. For services to the Business sector and to Community Development.

==== Member of the Order of the British Empire (MBE) ====
- Hosea Lala. For services to Education and to the Community.

== Belize ==
Below are the individuals appointed by Charles III in his right as King of Belize, on advice of His Majesty's Belize Ministers.

=== The Most Excellent Order of the British Empire ===
==== Commander of the Order of the British Empire (CBE) ====
- Antonio Habet. For services to Entrepreneurship.

==== Officer of the Order of the British Empire (OBE) ====
- Badra Helwa Coleman. For services to the Community.
- Juanita Lucas. For services to Education.

==== Member of the Order of the British Empire (MBE) ====
- Francis Simon Flores. For services to the Community.
- Troy Donahugh Gabb. For services to Sport and to the Community.
- Clinton Vincent Lightburn. For services to Sport.
- Benedicto Ramos. For services to Education.

== Antigua and Barbuda ==
Below are the individuals appointed by Charles III in his right as King of Antigua and Barbuda, on advice of His Majesty's Antigua and Barbuda Ministers.

=== The Most Excellent Order of the British Empire ===
==== Commander of the Order of the British Empire (CBE) ====
- Dr. Leon Errol Cort. For services to National Development.

==== Officer of the Order of the British Empire (OBE) ====
- Her Excellency Karen-Mae Hill. For services to Youth and Community Development.

==== Member of the Order of the British Empire (MBE) ====
- Erna-Mae Anêle Brathwaite. For services to Youth and Community Development.

=== King's Fire Service Medal (KFSM) ===
- Elvis Conrad Lemuel Weaver. For services to the Fire Service of the Royal Police Force of Antigua and Barbuda.

== Saint Christopher and Nevis ==
Below are the individuals appointed by Charles III in his right as King of Saint Christopher and Nevis, on advice of His Majesty's Saint Christopher and Nevis Ministers.

=== The Most Excellent Order of the British Empire ===
==== Officer of the Order of the British Empire (OBE) ====
- Alphonso E. Bridgewater. For services to Sports and Sports Administration.

==== Member of the Order of the British Empire (MBE) ====
- Eric Hanzley Maynard. For services to Social Outreach and Evangelism.
- Vida Henrietta Williams. For Public Service.
