= Maya (Campbell novel) =

2010 novel by Alastair Campbell

- First edition cover
- Author: Alastair Campbell
- Language: English
- Genre: Novel
- Publisher: Hutchinson
- Publication date: 2010
- Publication place: United Kingdom
- ISBN: 0-09-193087-1

Maya is a 2010 novel by Alastair Campbell, the former communications director to Tony Blair. It is Campbell's second novel and third book, after The Blair Years and All in the Mind. Maya drew generally favorable reviews and some claimed that it was in part based on his relationship with Blair; however, Campbell has denied this.
