= Andrew Griffiths (politician) =

British politician (born 1970)

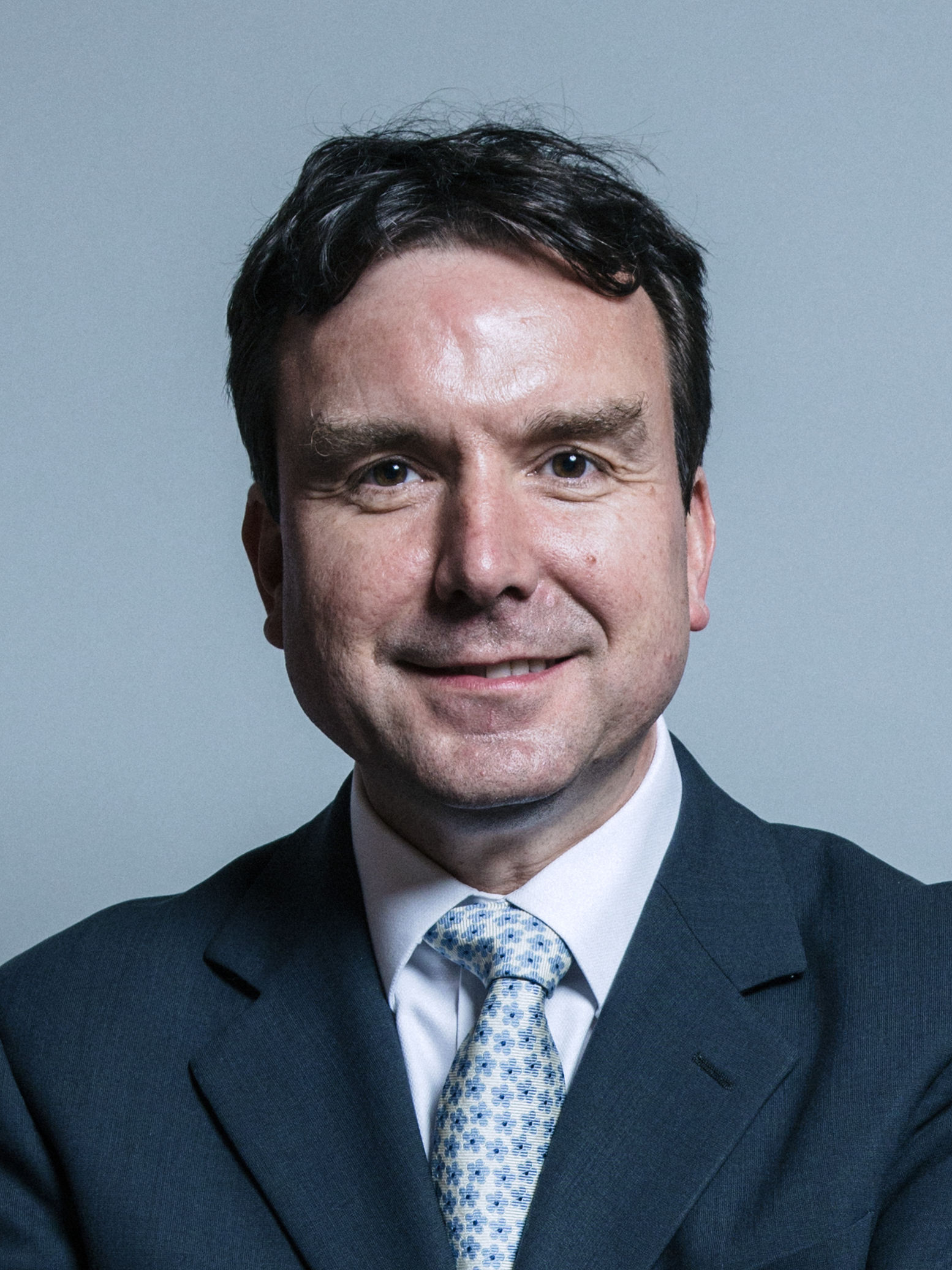
- Official portrait, 2017

Parliamentary Under-Secretary of State for Small Business, Consumers and Corporate Responsibility
- In office 9 January 2018 – 13 July 2018
- Prime Minister: Theresa May
- Preceded by: Margot James
- Succeeded by: Kelly Tolhurst

Lord Commissioner of the Treasury
- In office 17 July 2016 – 9 January 2018
- Prime Minister: Theresa May
- Preceded by: Mel Stride
- Succeeded by: Nigel Adams

Member of Parliament for Burton
- In office 6 May 2010 – 6 November 2019
- Preceded by: Janet Dean
- Succeeded by: Kate Griffiths

Personal details
- Born: 19 October 1970 (age 55) Dudley, Staffordshire, England
- Party: Conservative
- Spouse: Kate Kniveton (m. 2013; div. 2018)
- Children: 1
- Occupation: Politician
- Website: andrewgriffithsmp.com

Andrew James Griffiths (born 19 October 1970) is a former British politician who served as the Member of Parliament (MP) for Burton from 2010 to 2019. A member of the Conservative Party, he was succeeded by his estranged wife, Kate Griffiths.

During his parliamentary career, Griffiths was the Parliamentary Under-Secretary of State for Small Business, Consumers and Corporate Responsibility at the Department for Business, Energy and Industrial Strategy from January 2018. He resigned in July 2018 after the Sunday Mirror reported that he had sent up to 2,000 sexually explicit text messages to two female constituents.

== Early life and career ==
Andrew Griffiths was born on 19 October 1970 in Dudley, Staffordshire to Robert and Harriet Griffiths (née Du'Rose). He attended Bramford Primary School and High Arcal School. He is the youngest of their five children. His father was a local councillor for 34 years and Mayor of Dudley in 1982. After finishing secondary school, Griffiths joined the family engineering business. He then worked for the Leeds Permanent Building Society.

In 1999, Griffiths began to work for the West Midlands constituency MEP team in the European Parliament in Brussels, before being appointed adviser on farming. He worked for the European Agricultural Spokesman Neil Parish MEP. Griffiths stood as a Conservative council candidate on three separate occasions, but was not elected. He first contested the safe Labour seat of Dudley North at the 2001 general election, coming in 6,800 votes behind Labour's Ross Cranston. Griffiths unsuccessfully stood as a Conservative candidate at the 2004 European Parliament election in the West Midlands constituency.

After the election, he became chief of staff to MP Theresa May. In 2006, he moved to work for the Culture, Media and Sport team, working as chief of staff to Hugo Swire. After Swire was removed as part of a cabinet reshuffle, Griffiths became chief of staff to Eric Pickles, Shadow Secretary of State for Communities and Local Government, and remained Pickles' chief of staff when he became the Conservative Party chairman. Griffiths was a member of the A-List and was selected as a parliamentary candidate for Burton in November 2006.

== Parliamentary career ==
Griffiths was elected at the 2010 general election for Burton, regaining the seat for the Conservatives for the first time since 1997 when it was held by Ivan Lawrence from 1974. Griffiths was re-elected at the 2015 general election. He served as secretary of the All-party parliamentary group (APPG) for the Misuse of Drugs and Alcohol, additional general secretary of the APPG for Kashmir, and vice-chairman of the APPG for Home Education. He was chairman of the APPG for Beer for five years and campaigned against increased taxes on beer (the beer duty escalator). He was a member of the Political and Constitutional Reform Select Committee between 2010 and 2013.

Griffiths did not join fellow local Conservative MPs Andrew Bridgen and Heather Wheeler in campaigning for the return of passenger rail services on the Burton to Leicester railway line via the Ivanhoe Line. However, he did campaign for improvements to be made to Burton Station.

In February 2015, Griffiths was awarded Parliamentarian of the Year by the Campaign for Real Ale (CAMRA) in recognition of his role in campaigning for the reduction of tax increases on beer. The award sparked controversy from some CAMRA campaigners due to Griffiths' opposition to other CAMRA campaigns on increasing planning controls on public houses to prevent their loss, and for opposing reform to the controversial system of "beer ties" which oblige landlords to pay higher prices to the chain owners (pubcos) for their beer supplies.

Griffths supported the UK remaining within the EU in the 2016 EU membership referendum.

Following Theresa May becoming prime minister in July 2016, Griffiths was appointed as a junior government whip with the title of lord commissioner of HM Treasury on 17 July 2016.

During Jeremy Corbyn's response to the November 2017 Budget on 22 November 2017, Griffiths heckled him over his comments on the lack of adequate Government funding for care homes. Labour MPs accused Griffiths of ageism and abusive language for shouting that Corbyn belonged in a care home. Griffiths denied this, instead suggesting that he was responding to Corbyn's statement "there are elderly people in need of help," and that he said: "That's you!" Corbyn responded with the comment: "The uncaring, uncouth attitude of certain members of parliament needs to be called out."

He served as Parliamentary Under-Secretary of State for Small Business, Consumers and Corporate Responsibility in 2018.

On 12 February 2018, Griffiths received media coverage after he was interviewed on BBC Radio 5 Live to promote shared parental leave and said that he would not be able to take it himself when his own baby was due to be born later that year, saying, "Unfortunately, as a minister, I'm not allowed... Ministers are not allowed to take shared parental leave." The presenter, Emma Barnett, said: "Hang on a minute, back up a second, you’ve just come on the radio to promote Shared Parental Leave and you’re in a job where the rules could be changed because you are the rule-makers, where you’re not allowed to take Shared Parental Leave?" "That’s right," responded Griffiths. "How can you say that without laughing?" asked Barnett. Griffiths said his main concern was for other parents to take advantage of the system.

In March 2018, Griffiths was criticised by opposition MPs for blocking an SNP proposal for a bill that would secure the national minimum wage for those working on a "trial period" basis. It was revealed that Griffiths had previously advertised for an unpaid intern position in his own office. In response, Griffiths admitted he had used unpaid interns, but argued that the bill was not needed because existing law was already adequate in this area.

Griffiths did not stand at the 2019 general election after party members did not reselect him. His estranged wife Kate was selected as the Conservative candidate and succeeded him as the MP for his constituency Burton.

== Sexual misconduct allegations ==
On 14 July 2018, the Sunday Mirror reported that Griffiths had sent up to 2,000 sexually explicit texts in a three-week period to two of his female constituents. In response to this, he resigned from his ministerial position and he was suspended by the Conservative Party. He had previously been accused of inappropriate touching and bullying of a Conservative borough councillor and the bullying of the leader of another council as well as his former campaign manager.

In November 2018, during an interview with The Sunday Times, Griffiths claimed that he had planned to kill himself after the sexual misconduct allegations came to light. During the same interview, Griffiths said that the texts that he had sent to the women were "the result of my mental breakdown" following a "battle with my own mental health". He disclosed that he had a long history of mental health problems resulting from being allegedly abused at the age of eight by a fifteen-year-old boy. On 12 December 2018, Griffiths had the Conservative whip restored, ending his suspension from the party. His reinstation was widely criticised for being announced hours before a confidence vote in Conservative leader Theresa May, making Griffiths eligible to participate.

On 8 September 2019, Griffiths was cleared of breaching the House of Commons' code of conduct by the parliamentary standards watchdog as it could not find any evidence that he sent messages while carrying out parliamentary activities.

In December 2021, it was revealed that a Family Court judge had ruled that Griffiths had repeatedly raped and sexually assaulted his then wife.

== Personal life ==
Griffiths married Kate Kniveton in 2013, and the two had a daughter in April 2018. They separated in 2018 and subsequently divorced.

In 2019, Griffiths applied to the Family Court wanting more contact with his daughter. Kate Griffiths objected, and gave evidence that her husband had subjected her to repeated physical and sexual abuse including rape. In November 2020 the judge accepted her evidence and ruled in her favour.

Family Court cases are usually confidential, but Kate Griffiths waived her right to anonymity and in December 2021 the Court of Appeal ruled that public interest was served by making an exception.

Parliament of the United Kingdom
Preceded by Janet Dean	Member of Parliament for Burton; 2010–2019	Succeeded by Kate Griffiths
