= Fiona Millar =

British journalist and education campaigner

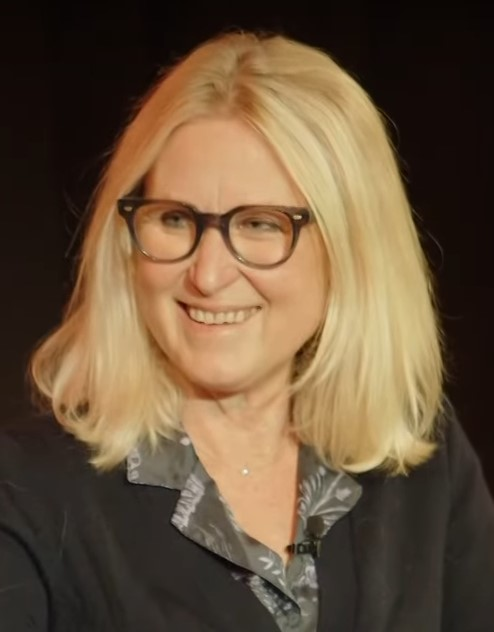
- Millar in 2023
- Born: 2 January 1958 (age 68); Lambeth, London, England
- Education: University College London
- Occupation: Journalist
- Partner: Alastair Campbell
- Children: 3

Fiona Millar (born 2 January 1958) is a British journalist and campaigner on education and parenting issues. She is a former adviser to Cherie Blair. Millar contributes to The Guardian and the Local Schools Network website.

== Early life ==
As a small child, Millar lived on Great Portland Street, near Broadcasting House. Millar grew up in St John's Wood, northwest London, attending two primary schools there, including Barrow Hill, with her brother, Gavin Millar, who later became a KC. In 1963, her father Bob wrote the book The Affluent Sheep, having researched around 500 families, which claimed that most housewives shopped with "unwarranted complacency" about prices. Her mother took part in voluntary work for deprived children, and was party secretary of the Marylebone Labour group, later working at the Portman Early Childhood Centre in the northwest of Marylebone.

At the age of 16, Millar became assistant secretary of St Marylebone Labour Party. In 1975, her father was the press officer of the Marylebone Labour group, when Anne Weyman was the chairman; Weyman would later be chief executive from 1996-2008 of the Family Planning Association, and latterly the vice-chair of Britain for Europe. When Millar's father became vice-chair of the Labour group in 1976, the secretary was Lady Lucan (born Kaitlin Dawson, 1900-1985) who was the mother of the notorious Lord Lucan. Millar was 18 at the time.

Millar attended Camden School for Girls from 1968 to 1975. She studied economics and economic history at University College London, and joined the Mirror Group's graduate training scheme in 1980.

== Career ==
=== Author ===
Millar began in journalism as a trainee on the Mirror Group Graduate Training Scheme in the West Country, later moving to the Daily Express, where she worked as a news reporter and lobby correspondent. She was a freelance journalist between 1988 and 1995, contributing to the Daily Express, the Sunday Mirror and The House magazine, Parliament's in-house publication. In 1993, she co-authored (with Glenys Kinnock) By Faith and Daring, Interviews with Remarkable Women, to celebrate the tenth anniversary of Virago Press.

=== Political career ===
Millar worked in the office of the Leader of the Opposition from 1995 to 1997, as an adviser to Cherie Blair from 1995 to 2003, as a Special Adviser to the Prime Minister Tony Blair between 1997 and 2003, as head of Cherie Blair's office, and Director of Events and Visits at Downing Street. Millar opposed the 2003 invasion of Iraq, but was pressured to stay at Downing Street because of the risk of adverse publicity. She informed Blair of her definite intention to resign after the capture of Baghdad, on the day of the toppling of Saddam Hussein's statue. The resignation was publicly announced in August 2003.

In June 2011, it was reported that Glenda Jackson, the Labour MP for Hampstead and Kilburn, would be retiring at the next general election. Millar denied suggestions that she would be standing as Jackson's successor, saying: "I think I'm too old now." Millar added, "I'm not thinking of standing, definitely not." Millar's name was again linked to the seat in January 2013. However, in April that year, she confirmed that she would not be running in for the selection, telling the Evening Standard: "I have decided I want to stick to campaigning on schools issues."

During Jeremy Corbyn's leadership of the Labour Party, Millar contemplated leaving the party. In an op-ed for The Guardian in August 2018, Millar wrote about her dilemma over whether to leave the Labour Party after over 40 years: "The most pressing reason is Brexit. If there is an election in the next 12 months, I won't be able to vote for a party that supports or facilitates Brexit." Added to this was the "shockingly badly handled antisemitism row". Millar said "it was a mistake not to adopt the internationally recognised definition of antisemitism", surmising that "Corbyn is completely unsuited to being prime minister." Millar was also unimpressed by his policy platform: "Finally, to me anyway, he isn't even very radical. I have searched in vain for any far-reaching ideas that might disrupt our current market-driven, hierarchical school system – my particular area of interest. But there are none. Without drastic change to current education policy Corbyn's banal rhetoric about fairness and equality is just hot air."

=== Education campaigner ===
In 2003, Millar started writing a monthly column for The Guardian about education. She has continued to contribute to the newspaper since then.

Millar presented a documentary film for Channel Four in 2004, The Best for My Child, examining how the quasi-market in schools was working in practice.

In 2005, along with Melissa Benn, Millar co-wrote a pamphlet, "A Comprehensive Future: Quality and Equality for All Our Children", and is active in the campaign against the Trust Schools white paper, appearing alongside Labour Party figures Neil Kinnock and Estelle Morris at campaign meetings.

Between 2009 and 2013, Millar was chair of Comprehensive Future, an organisation that promotes the perceived advantages of comprehensive schools in the UK. From 2000 to 2010, she was Chair of Governors at Gospel Oak Primary School.

As of May 2024, Millar is a governor at William Ellis boys' comprehensive school and Parliament Hill School.

Millar received the Fred and Anne Jarvis Award from the National Union of Teachers in 2009 for her campaigning for good-quality local comprehensive schools as against academies. That same year, The Secret World of the Working Mother, a book by Millar about finding a balance between working and being a mother, was published.

In 2010, Millar helped form the Local Schools Network, a pro-state schools pressure group. In 2018, she published The Best for My Child: Did the schools market deliver? to mark the 30th anniversary of the Education Reform Act 1988.

=== Other roles ===
Between 2003 and 2010, Millar was chair of trustees of the Family and Parenting Institute, and since 2013, has been chair of the National Youth Arts Trust.

For seven years, she chaired the Trustee Board of the Young Camden Foundation, a role she vacated in March 2024.

Millar became a trustee of the Camden Abu Dis Friendship Association in October 2020, a charity which aims to promote human rights in Palestine. As of May 2024, she is the charity's minutes secretary.

== Personal life ==
Millar's partner is Alastair Campbell, Tony Blair's former director of communications. The couple, who live in Gospel Oak, have two sons and a daughter, Grace Campbell. Campbell and Millar entered into a civil partnership in March 2021, having been together for 42 years.

Millar is a patron of the National Association for Special Educational Needs and Humanists UK.

== Books ==
- Millar, Fiona; Kinnock, Glenys (January 1995). By Faith and Daring: Interviews with Remarkable Women. Virago. ISBN 1853816329.
- Millar, Fiona (March 2009). The Secret World of the Working Mother. Vermilion. ISBN 9780091924232.
- Millar, Fiona (May 2018). The Best for My Child. Did the schools market deliver?. John Catt Educational. ISBN 9781911382645.
