= Alastair Campbell =

British journalist and political adviser (born 1957)

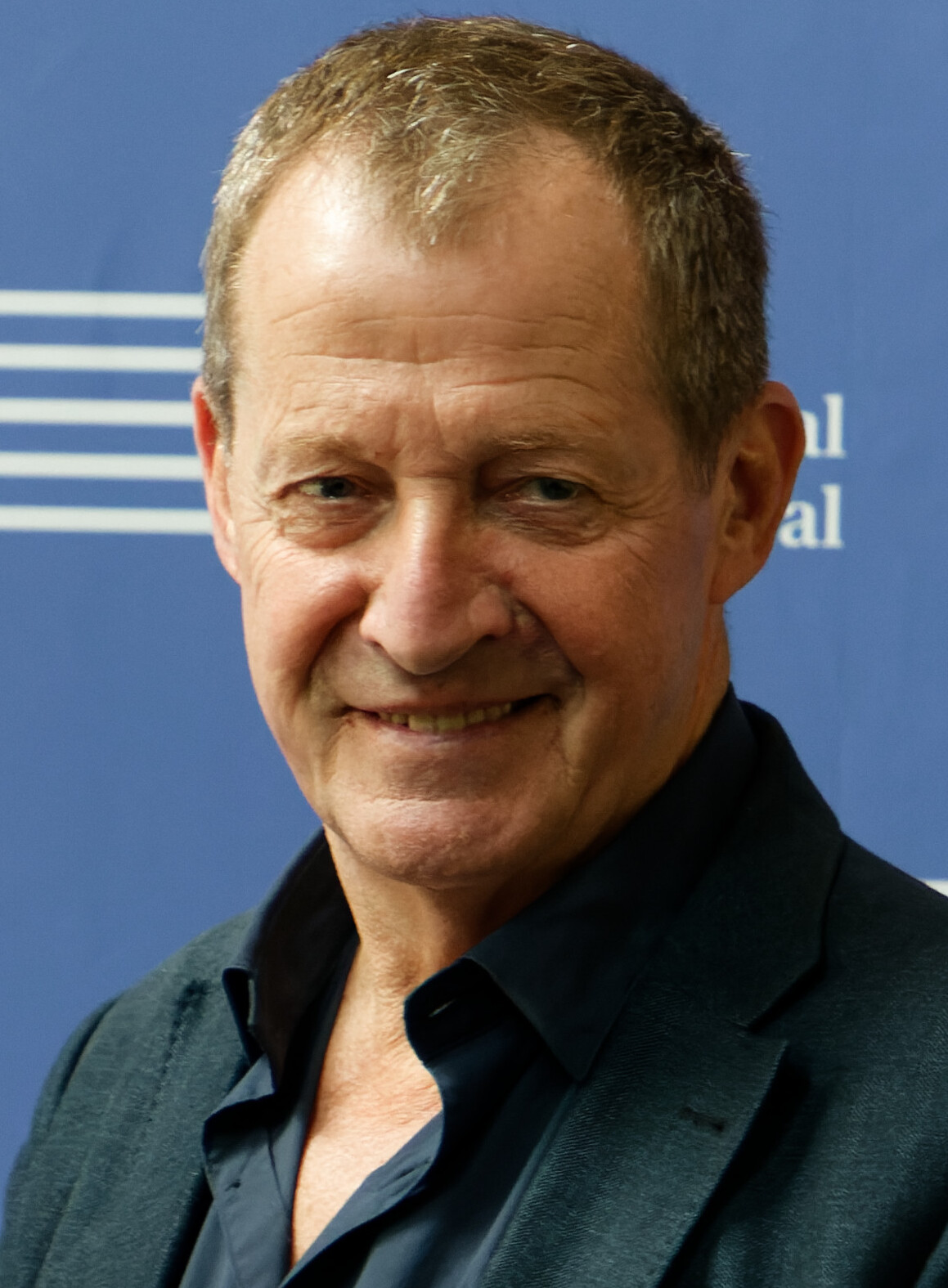
- Campbell in 2024

Downing Street Director of Communications and Strategy
- In office 15 July 2000 – 29 August 2003
- Prime Minister: Tony Blair
- Preceded by: Position established
- Succeeded by: David Hill

Downing Street Press Secretary
- In office 2 May 1997 – 15 July 2000
- Prime Minister: Tony Blair
- Preceded by: Jonathan Haslam
- Succeeded by: Godric Smith

Prime Minister's Official Spokesperson
- In office 2 May 1997 – 15 July 2000
- Prime Minister: Tony Blair
- Preceded by: Office established
- Succeeded by: Godric Smith

Personal details
- Born: Alastair John Campbell; 25 May 1957 (age 69) Keighley, West Yorkshire, England
- Party: Independent (since 2019)
- Other political affiliations: Labour (until 2019)
- Domestic partner: Fiona Millar
- Children: 3, including Grace
- Education: Gonville and Caius College, Cambridge (BA)
- Occupation: Activist; author; broadcaster; journalist; strategist
- Known for: Tony Blair's strategist; The Rest Is Politics
- Website: www.alastaircampbell.org

Alastair John Campbell (born 25 May 1957) is a British journalist, author, strategist, broadcaster, and activist. Campbell worked as Tony Blair's spokesman and campaign director in opposition (1994–1997), then as Downing Street Press Secretary, and as the Prime Minister's Official Spokesperson (1997–2000). He then became Downing Street's director of communications and spokesman for the Labour Party (2000–2003).

Campbell was political editor at the Daily Mirror newspaper in the 1980s and of Today in the 1990s. Shortly after Blair was elected as Leader of the Labour Party in 1994, Campbell left the Today to become Blair's press secretary. He was one of several key people responsible for the rebranding of the Labour Party as New Labour before its victory in the 1997 general election. In addition to being the press spokesman, Campbell was Blair's speechwriter and chief strategist, earning a reputation for ruthless news management. Campbell played an important role in the run-up to the 1997 general election, working with Peter Mandelson to co-ordinate Labour's successful election campaign.

When Labour won the general election in May 1997, Campbell served as Blair's chief press secretary. He put Downing Street briefings on record for the first time, and although he was only identified as the Prime Minister's Official Spokesman, he became one of the most high-profile and written-about figures in British politics, earning the epithet "the real deputy Prime Minister". Campbell oversaw Blair's successful 2001 general election campaign for re-election. In the run-up to the Iraq War, Campbell was involved in the preparation and release of the September Dossier in 2002 and the Iraq Dossier in 2003. Campbell was accused of influencing the reports against the wishes of the intelligence services, which led to Campbell battling with the BBC as well as the general media and later resigning. He returned to assist with the successful 2005 general election campaign.

Since his work for Blair, Campbell has continued to act as a freelance advisor to a number of governments and political parties. He was an adviser to the People's Vote campaign, campaigning for a public vote on the final Brexit deal. He is the editor-at-large of The New World (formerly The New European) and chief interviewer for GQ. He acts as a consultant strategist and as an ambassador for Time to Change and other mental health charities. Throughout his time in Downing Street, Campbell kept a diary which reportedly totalled some two million words. Selected extracts, titled The Blair Years, were published in 2007. He expressed an intention to publish the diaries in fuller form, which he did from 2010 to 2018. In 2019, Campbell was expelled from the Labour Party after voting for the Liberal Democrats in that month's European elections.

In 2022, Campbell launched the podcast The Rest Is Politics with Rory Stewart, in which they discuss various political issues of the day.

== Early life and education ==
Alastair John Campbell was born on 25 May 1957 in Keighley, West Yorkshire, the son of Scottish veterinary surgeon Donald Campbell and his wife, Elizabeth (née Caldwell), who had moved to Keighley when his father became a partner in a local veterinary practice. His mother, Elizabeth Howie Caldwell, was from Burnhouse, Moscow, East Ayrshire. His father was from Corrairigh, Cornaigbeg, Tiree, the son of Lachlan Campbell. His parents married at Laigh Kirk, Kilmarnock, on 18 March 1953. Campbell grew up with two older brothers, Donald and Graeme, and a younger sister, Elizabeth.

Campbell attended Bradford Grammar School for a short period of time, followed by City of Leicester Boys' Grammar School. He was an undergraduate student of Gonville and Caius College at the University of Cambridge where he studied modern languages (French and German), gaining an upper second class degree.

== Journalism ==
Following graduation from Cambridge, he joined the Mirror Group training scheme and spent a year at a local weekly paper. He became the sports editor at the Tavistock Times, writing a column called 'Campbell's Corner'. He published Inter-City Ditties, his winning entry to a readers' competition in Forum, the journalistic counterpart to Penthouse magazine. This led to a lengthy stint writing pieces for the magazine. His first piece for mainstream news journalism was coverage of the Penlee lifeboat disaster in December 1981, while a trainee on the Plymouth-based Sunday Independent, then owned by Mirror Group.

In 1982, Campbell moved to the London office of the Daily Mirror, Fleet Street's sole remaining big-circulation supporter of the Labour Party. He became a political correspondent, then in 1986 moved to Today, a full-colour tabloid newspaper, where he worked as a news editor. His rapid rise and its accompanying stress led to alcohol abuse. In 1986, while accompanying Labour leader Neil Kinnock on a tour of Scotland, Campbell had a nervous breakdown. He stayed in Ross Hall Hospital, a private BMI hospital in Glasgow. Over the next five days as an in-patient, he was given medication to calm him. After seeing a psychiatrist, he realised that he had an alcohol problem. Campbell said that from that day onwards he counted each day that he did not drink alcohol, and did not stop counting until he had reached thousands. He experienced a period of depression and he was reluctant to seek further medical help. He eventually cooperated with treatment from his family doctor.

Campbell returned to the Daily Mirror, where he eventually became political editor. He was a close adviser to Kinnock and Daily Mirror publisher Robert Maxwell. Shortly after Maxwell drowned in November 1991, Campbell punched The Guardian journalist Michael White after White joked about "Captain Bob, Bob, Bob...bobbing" in the Atlantic Ocean, referring to where the tycoon's body had been recovered. Campbell later put this down to stress over uncertainty as to whether he and his colleagues would lose their jobs. After leaving the Daily Mirror in 1993, Campbell became political editor of Today.

== Politics and government ==
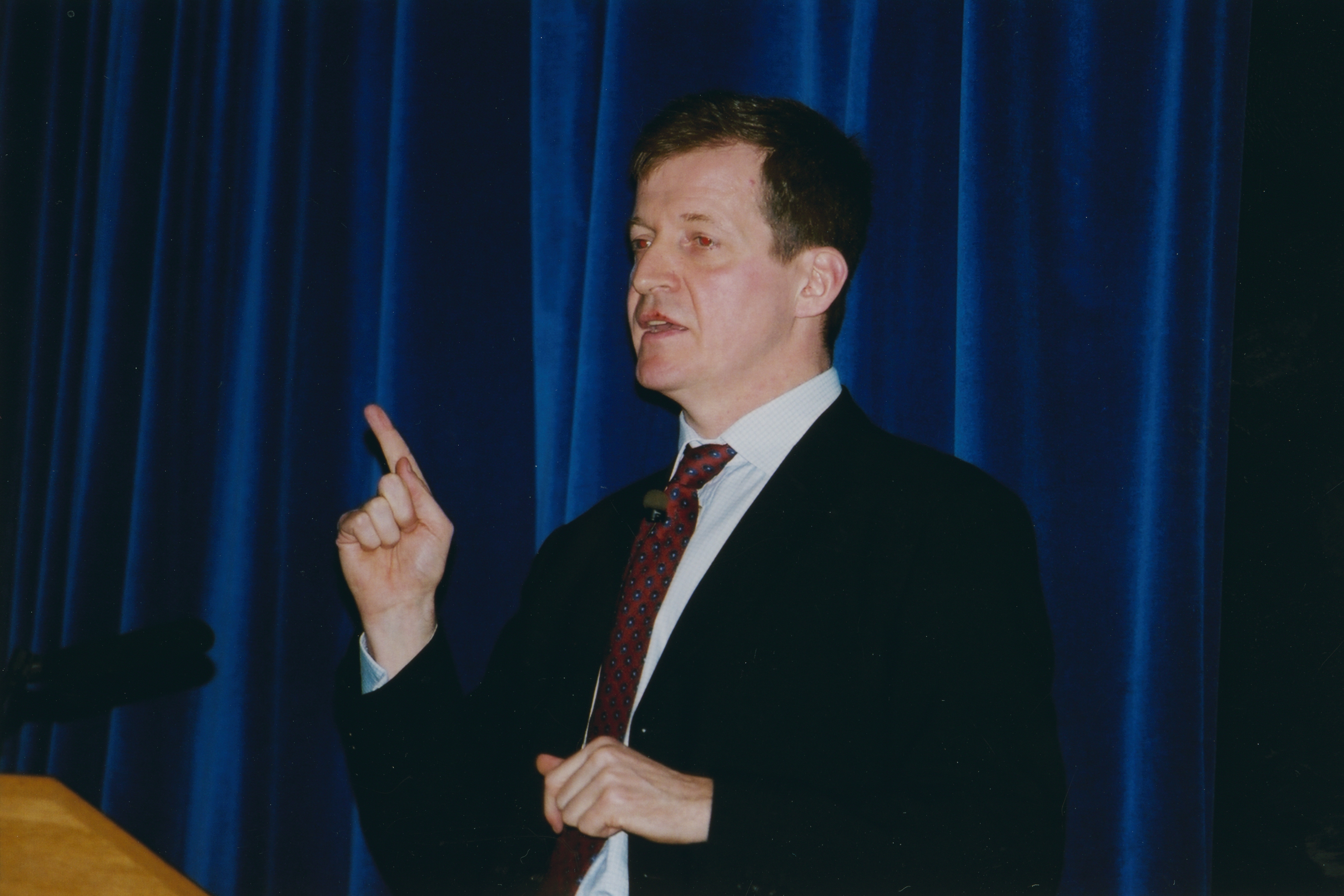
Campbell lecturing at the LSE series 'From Kennedy to Blair,' 7 July 2003

In 1994, shortly after Tony Blair was elected as Leader of the Labour Party, Campbell left the Today newspaper to become Blair's press secretary. In his autobiography, Blair would later state that Campbell had coined the name "New Labour" and described Campbell as a "genius". Campbell wrote the speech that led to the party's review of Clause IV and the birth of "New Labour". In addition to being the press spokesman, Campbell was Blair's speechwriter and chief strategist, earning a reputation for ruthless news management. The Conservatives conceded they were partly defeated by their inability to find someone to match him. Campbell played an important role in the run-up to the 1997 UK general election, working with Peter Mandelson to co-ordinate Labour's successful election campaign. He also worked hard to win support from the national media for the Labour Party, particularly from newspapers that for many years had been anti-Labour. By March 1997, many of the leading newspapers, including The Sun, once a staunch supporter of Margaret Thatcher, declared their support for Labour.

When Labour won the general election in May 1997, Campbell served as the Prime Minister Blair's chief press secretary (1997–2000). He persuaded Cabinet Secretary Robin Butler that government communications had to be modernised, and the government set up the Mountfield Review. He created a Strategic Communications Unit which gave Downing Street the power to co-ordinate all government activity, using what became known as "the grid" as its main apparatus. He set up a rapid rebuttal unit similar to the one he had used in opposition. He put Downing Street briefings on record for the first time, and although he was only identified as "The Prime Minister's Official Spokesman", he became one of the most high-profile and written-about figures in British politics, earning the epithet "the real deputy Prime Minister". He opened briefings to the foreign media, which were among a raft of modernisation and efficiency strategies he introduced. In 2001 Campbell claimed that the days of the "bog standard" comprehensive school were over, due to educational policies of the Labour government.

BBC documentary maker Michael Cockerell produced a full-length documentary about Campbell's media operation, News From Number Ten. Campbell attacked the news media for their obsession with him, and eventually began to pull back from frontline work and delegated direct briefing of the media to others. He then moved to the post of Prime Minister's Director of Communications.

Campbell was part of the core team that conducted the negotiations that led to the Good Friday Agreement in Northern Ireland, and he has been honoured by several Irish universities for his role in the peace process. He became a close friend of Martin McGuinness, and attended his funeral in 2017. McGuinness helped Campbell with a novel which had an Irish Republican Army (IRA) active service unit as part of the plot.

Campbell was seconded to overhaul the communications of NATO during the Kosovo War, when US President Bill Clinton feared NATO was losing the propaganda war against the Slobodan Milošević regime. The general in charge of the military operation, Wesley Clark, credited Campbell with bringing order and discipline to NATO communications, and freeing the military to do its job.

Campbell became a central figure in the handling of the aftermath of Diana, Princess of Wales's death after the head of the royal household, the Earl of Airlie, asked Tony Blair to second Campbell to help prepare the funeral, saying they knew it would have to be different. Campbell is widely reported to have coined the phrase "the people's princess" and to have persuaded the queen to make her broadcast to the nation more personal, not least by using the phrase "speaking as a grandmother".

Campbell oversaw Blair's successful 2001 UK general election campaign for re-election and also returned to assist with the successful 2005 UK general election campaign.

=== Iraq War ===
In the run-up to the Iraq War, Campbell was involved in the preparation and release of the "September Dossier" in 2002 and the "Iraq Dossier" in February 2003. These documents argued the case for concern over weapons of mass destruction in Iraq. Both have been criticised as overstating or distorting the actual intelligence findings. Subsequent investigations revealed that the "September Dossier" had been altered at Campbell's suggestion to be consistent with a 12 September 2002 speech given by President George W. Bush and statements by other United States officials. On 9 September 2002, Campbell sent a memo to Sir John Scarlett, the chairman of the Joint Intelligence Committee, in which Campbell directed that the British dossier be "one that complements rather than conflicts with" the US claims.

On 29 May 2003, Andrew Gilligan of the BBC first alleged Campbell to have influenced the reports against the wishes of the intelligence services, misrepresenting his source, Dr David Kelly, in the process. This led to Campbell battling with the BBC as well as the general media.

A Channel 4 interview The Guardian called 'infamous' even 20 years later, and forcefully written diary entries made public in the Hutton Inquiry into the death of David Kelly led Campbell to resign during the inquiry. Upon publication of its findings, the Chair of the BBC Gavyn Davies, its Director-General Greg Dyke, and Andrew Gilligan resigned. The BBC's online history of itself describes it as "one of the most damaging episodes in the BBC's history". After Campbell's resignation, a complete overhaul of the Prime Minister's press office was suggested in internal government documents, as the press office was seen to have "lost all credibility as a reliable, truthful, objective operation".

Neither a parliamentary investigation in 2003 led by Lord Hutton, nor a private review in 2004 of the intelligence services by Lord Butler found cases of wrongdoing on Campbell's behalf. Neither did the Chilcot Inquiry of 2016, which was much more critical of the government than previous investigations. However, the opposite case continued to be made in the media, as well as by Dyke and Gilligan.

Another view has been offered by Biljiana Scott, as early as 2004. She suggested that an accessible explanation for the incident can be found by examining the parties' differing professional cultures. Kelly sought to communicate scientific truth, Gilligan sought to communicate the government's lacking argument, and Campbell sought to communicate the case for war in the most convincing way available. Later in 2003, commenting on weapons of mass destruction in Iraq, Campbell said, "Come on, you don't seriously think we won't find anything?".

Years later, he remained convinced of the case for war. In 2013, in a speech Campbell gave in Australia, he argued that there had always been "spin" and propaganda, but that there was more pressure to tell the truth 'today' than there was during the Second World War. He went on to claim that Tony Blair had "greater commitment to wartime truth than Winston Churchill".

== Later career ==
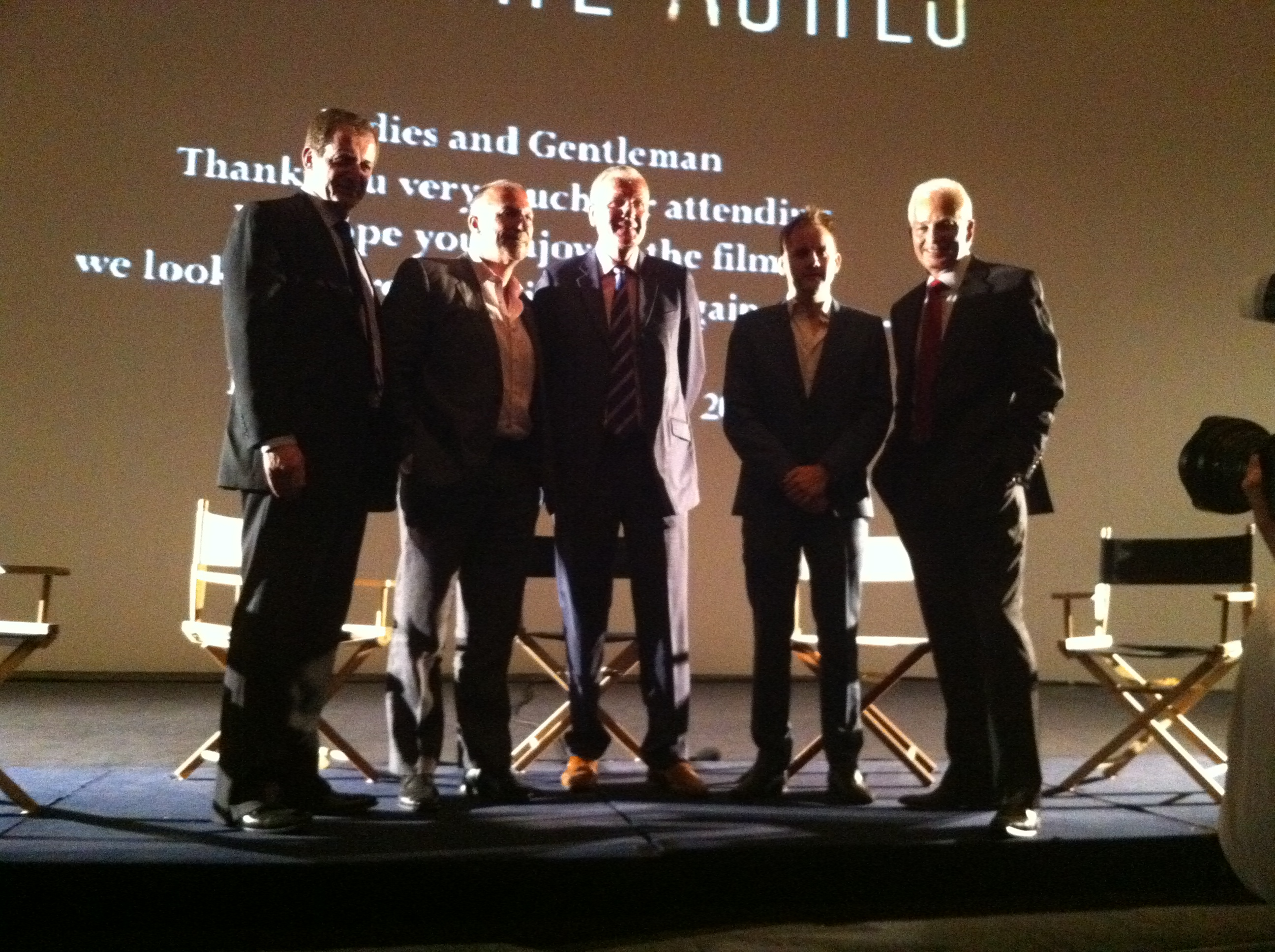
Campbell with cricketers Ian Botham, Bob Willis and David Gower, and politician James Erskine in 2011

Since his work for Blair, Campbell has continued to act as a freelance advisor to a number of governments and political parties, including Edi Rama, the Prime Minister of Albania.

Campbell worked again for the Labour Party as campaign director in the run-up to their third consecutive victory at the 2005 general election. Campbell also acted as an adviser to Gordon Brown and Ed Miliband at the 2010 and the 2015 general elections. Sir Clive Woodward recruited Campbell to manage relations with the press for the British & Irish Lions tour to New Zealand in 2005. Campbell wrote a column for The Times during the tour.

Throughout his time in Downing Street, Campbell kept a diary which reportedly totalled some 2 million words. Selected extracts, titled The Blair Years, were published on 9 July 2007. Subsequent press coverage of the book's release included coverage of what Campbell had chosen to leave out, particularly in respect of the relationship between Blair and his chancellor and successor Gordon Brown. Campbell expressed an intention to one day publish the diaries in fuller form, and indicated in the introduction to the book that he did not wish to make matters harder for Brown in his new role as Prime Minister, or to damage the Labour Party. Campbell released the diaries in fuller form from 2010 to 2018.

In 2003 and 2004, Campbell wrote a series for The Times newspapers, analysing greatness in sports to answer the question "Who is the greatest sports star of all time?" Although his conclusion was Muhammad Ali, as part of the process, he interviewed and profiled sports stars from around the world, including Ian Botham, Nick Faldo, Ben Ainslie, Michael Phelps, Martina Navratilova, Shane Warne, Alex Ferguson, Bobby Charlton and Lance Armstrong. Campbell later said that he "fell hook, line and sinker" for the Armstrong legend. He subsequently worked with Armstrong, campaigning for cancer charities, but drew criticism from Armstrong's nemesis David Walsh for being so supportive and defending him so passionately. Campbell later acknowledged Walsh had been right.

Campbell has his own website and blog, as well as several pages on other social media websites. He uses these platforms to discuss British politics and other topics close to his heart. So far, Campbell's commentaries and views have garnered media attention and generated interest among various online communities. In October 2008, he broadcast the personal story of his mental illness in a television documentary partly to reduce the stigma of that illness. He has written a novel on the subject entitled All in the Mind.

Campbell made his first appearance on the BBC One political discussion programme Question Time on 27 May 2010. At the opening of the edition, presenter David Dimbleby said that the new Conservative-Liberal Democrat coalition would not allow a frontbench member of the government to appear on the show unless Campbell was dropped. The BBC refused to do this. The government later accused the BBC of behaving improperly for allowing Campbell to appear as a more in-depth version of his diaries was due to be published the following week, and a Downing Street spokesman told The Guardian, "Campbell seemed to be on because he's flogging a book next week, so the BBC haven't behaved entirely properly here." Campbell said that he had waited until Labour were in opposition before appearing on the show and that the date was a coincidence as it was the only time he was free. He suggested the discord was part of a Conservative anti-BBC agenda. The minister who had been scheduled to appear was the then Chief Secretary to the Treasury David Laws, who Campbell produced a picture of during the programme. Three days later, Laws resigned from his post following revelations about possible irregularities in his expenses claims in The Telegraph the day before.

In 2011, Campbell contacted the Metropolitan Police with suspicions that his phone was hacked by the News of the World in 2003. He received damages, part of which he used to sponsor the Burnley women's football team.

In May 2012, Campbell took a role at PR agency Portland Communications, at the invitation of Tim Allan, a former adviser to Tony Blair. Along with Blair, Campbell has also provided consultancy services to the government of Kazakhstan on "questions of social economic modernisation."

=== Return to journalism ===
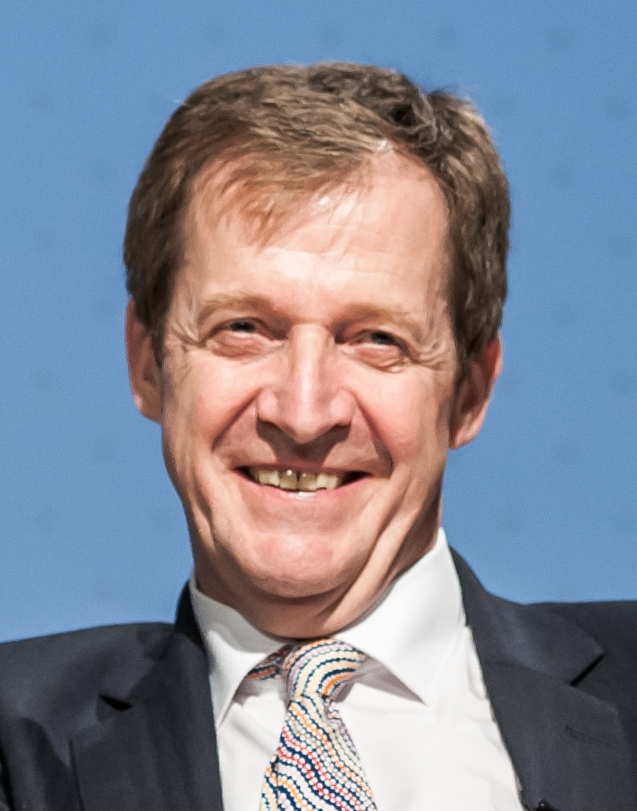
Campbell in 2015

In January 2014, Campbell announced that he was joining British GQ, with a brief to conduct interviews with figures from "politics... sport, business, culture, (and) other aspects of life that I find interesting", succeeding Piers Morgan. In his role at GQ Campbell has interviewed a wide range of public figures, including José Mourinho, Raheem Sterling, Trent Alexander-Arnold, Mario Balotelli, Mo Farah and Usain Bolt from the world of sport and Tony Blair, Sadiq Khan, Nicola Sturgeon, George Osborne, John McDonnell, John Bercow, and Chuka Umunna from the world of politics. Campbell has also conducted in-depth interviews with many other figures from public life, including Archbishop Justin Welby, Garry Kasparov and Rachel Riley. In 2017, Campbell conducted an interview with Prince William. In March 2017, GQ began to film the interviews to use as part of their digital platform, beginning with an interview with Owen Jones, and then Tony Blair. When Jeremy Corbyn was interviewed for the magazine in late 2017, he did so on the condition that Campbell would not be the interviewer.

In May 2016, the International Business Times announced that Campbell had joined it as a columnist.

In March 2017, the newspaper The New European announced that it had appointed Campbell as editor-at-large.

In May 2019, Campbell announced that he and his daughter Grace, a comedian and feminist, had launched a joint podcast, Football, Feminism and Everything in Between: a series of interviews with figures from politics, sport and other walks of life. Their first interview was with Ed Miliband, followed by Rachel Riley, Jamie Carragher, Kelly Holmes and Maro Itoje.

When Government Adviser Dominic Cummings broke government guidelines to visit Durham, England, Campbell urged his social media followers to write to all Conservative MPs asking for their view and published a 50,000-word analysis of what he called 'Organised Hypocrisy' on his website, based on the responses he collated.

Campbell was a guest presenter of Good Morning Britain from 10 to 12 May 2021, co-hosting with Susanna Reid.

In January 2022, Campbell began a series of interviews for Men's Health called Talking Heads, with a focus on mindset and well-being. This began with England rugby player Maro Itoje and former athlete turned sports politician Sebastian Coe.

In March 2022, Campbell launched The Rest Is Politics podcast with Rory Stewart, a former Conservative Member of Parliament and a candidate in the 2019 Conservative Party leadership election. The pair discuss current news stories and reminisce about their old jobs. It became the top politics podcast in the UK in the Apple ranking within six months.

In May 2023, Campbell published his eighteenth book, But What Can I Do?, a call to arms to people to get more engaged in politics. He provides an analysis of what he refers to as "populism, polarisation and post-truth politics". The book went to No 1 in the Sunday Times bestseller list in the first week of publication, meaning Campbell had both the most popular podcast (The Rest Is Politics) and the best-selling non-fiction hardback book in the UK at the same time.

Campbell launched a regular series of 'Instagram live' broadcasts, in which he vented his criticisms of Boris Johnson. Campbell was a critic of Russia's invasion of Ukraine, and the British government's tolerance of oligarchs close to Vladimir Putin, contrasting it with their 'cruel and shabby' treatment of Ukrainian refugees, who faced large amounts of red tape before being considered for exile. He wrote extensively on his meetings with the Russian president alongside Tony Blair.

=== People's Vote campaign ===
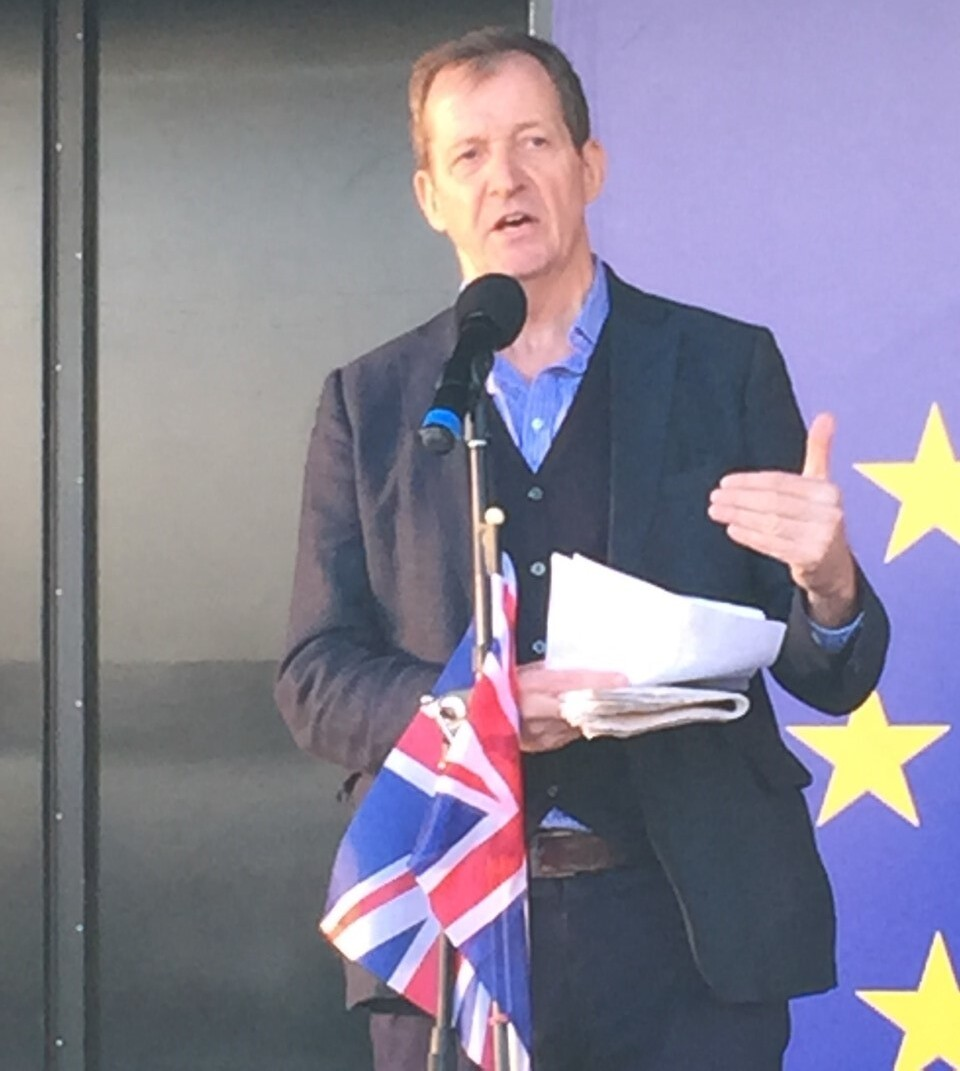
Campbell speaking at an anti-Brexit rally in Parliament Square, London, on 25 March 2017

Immediately after the UK's referendum on membership of the European Union in June 2016, Campbell stated that he thought it was "the worst decision Britain had made in his lifetime" and would do what he could to change people's minds. In addition to establishing The New European, he was one of the early movers in the People's Vote campaign for a referendum on the outcome of the Brexit negotiations.

In 2018 Campbell became part of the top table team at the People's Vote campaign fighting for a referendum on the Brexit deal. This included overseeing the production of campaign films, including one written by and starring his daughter Grace, called The Brexit Special, for which Campbell persuaded actor Richard Wilson to revive his most famous character, Victor Meldrew.

In 2018 Campbell worked for the People's Vote campaign's planning and organisation of a march on Parliament on 20 October, which drew an estimated 250,000 people onto the streets. The march was described by the media as the second biggest ever, after the protest against the Iraq war in 2003.

Campbell helped organise and spoke at a second march and rally attended by an estimated million people in October 2019, on the day that Boris Johnson called a rare Saturday sitting in Parliament to back his Brexit deal.

In July 2017, Campbell was invited to speak at the French National Assembly to the newly elected MPs of President Emmanuel Macron's victorious En Marche party. This was after Campbell had met and advised Macron during the campaign. He urged the French to be patient with the United Kingdom and to give them a chance to change course and reverse Brexit. He said Macron had been bolder than Tony Blair in setting up a new party and leading it to power within little over a year.

Campbell wrote a piece criticising the chairman of Open Britain, Roland Rudd, after Rudd unilaterally decided to sack two key campaign officials ahead of the 2019 UK general election.

=== Mental health activism ===
Campbell's experience with depression was recalled in a BBC documentary titled Cracking Up. He has since then been a prominent supporter and advocate for the mental health anti-stigma campaign Time to Change. In November 2017, he was made an honorary fellow of the Royal College of Psychiatrists in recognition of his work in breaking down the stigma surrounding mental illness and promoting the importance of psychiatry.

Campbell took part in the Mental Health Foundation's takeover of Channel 4 for Mental Health Awareness Week 2017, acting as a celebrity continuity announcer. For the Mental Health Awareness Week two years later he broadcast the documentary Alastair Campbell: Depression and Me, exploring different ways of dealing and coping with depression. It was part of a BBC series drawing attention to different mental health conditions.

In 2019, Campbell was appointed global ambassador to Australians for Mental Health, a new umbrella organisation fighting for better services. He made numerous media appearances and caused controversy by saying on the Australian version of Question Time, that Donald Trump and fellow populists were "sowing the seeds of fascism".

=== Expulsion from Labour Party ===
On 28 May 2019, Campbell announced that he had been expelled from the Labour Party after voting for the Liberal Democrats in that month's European elections, and that he would appeal against the decision. He also questioned the speed of his expulsion compared to the treatment of Labour colleagues accused of antisemitism. In response, shadow minister Dawn Butler stated that it was common knowledge that voting for another party would result in automatic exclusion.

Campbell was a long-standing critic of Labour's Brexit strategy and in the May 2019 European elections, he voted for the Liberal Democrats as a protest vote. He announced this after the polls had closed in interviews on TV and radio covering the results as they came in. He said he did so, in common with many others, to persuade Labour unequivocally to back a People's Vote. Two days later, by email, he was expelled from the Party, a move which provoked a major media storm in which many other Labour members outed themselves as having voted for parties other than Labour, including Cherie Blair, Charles Clarke, Bob Ainsworth and Betty Boothroyd. A hashtag #ExpelMeToo trended on Twitter as ordinary members expressed their support for Campbell. He immediately appealed the decision, saying tactical voting was not a breach of the rule under which he had been expelled, and arguing that unless all others who had acted as he did were expelled he also had a case for discrimination. Labour deputy leader Tom Watson condemned the expulsion as "spiteful" and a number of senior MPs immediately called for the decision to be reversed, and an amnesty of all who voted against Labour in the European elections.

In July 2019, in the week Boris Johnson became prime minister, Campbell penned a 3,500-word open letter to Jeremy Corbyn saying he no longer wished to be re-admitted to the party despite legal advice saying he would win a court case against his expulsion. He called on Corbyn to step down and cited his "failure" on Brexit, antisemitism, broader policy and "above all the failure to develop and execute a strategy". The story was broken in The Guardian and the full letter published in The New European. Corbyn said he was "disappointed", prompting Campbell to ask why he had been expelled.

Campbell voted Labour in the 2019 general election, having been part of a failed tactical voting campaign aimed at preventing Johnson from winning a majority. Labour were returned to government in the 2024 general election, under the leadership of Keir Starmer. Campbell and Stewart appeared on the election night coverage on Channel 4.

== Personal life ==
Campbell entered into a civil partnership with British journalist Fiona Millar, on 30 March 2021, after being together for 42 years. The couple have two sons and a daughter, the comedian Grace Campbell. In early 2025, news outlets reported that Alastair Campbell's son, Rory Campbell, was facing legal action over a failed football betting syndicate. Allegedly involving around 50 investors—including Alastair Campbell and his wife, Fiona—the syndicate was said to have incurred losses of up to £5 million.

Campbell's nephew James Naish has been the Labour Member of Parliament for Rushcliffe since 2024.

Campbell's older brother Donald suffered from schizophrenia and died in 2016, aged 62, from complications resulting from his illness. Campbell has talked extensively about how Donald had inspired him to fight for better mental health services and understanding, and to become the ambassador for several mental health charities.

Campbell is a lifelong Burnley supporter. He is regularly involved in events with the club, and was involved in rescuing the club from potential bankruptcy. He was one of the founders of the University College of Football Business, based at Burnley's stadium. Campbell is also a fan of the rugby league club Keighley Cougars, as it had been a childhood dream of his to play for the team.

In his spare time, Campbell plays the bagpipes to relieve stress. During the COVID-19 pandemic, he performed on the bagpipes in a charity song written by Martin Gillespie of Scottish band Skerryvore, "Everyday Heroes", which topped the iTunes download charts. Campbell also has an interest in the music of the Belgian singer Jacques Brel.

Campbell is a keen runner, cyclist, swimmer and triathlete, having raised over half a million pounds for charity running the London Marathon in 2003. In his 60s, he developed an interest in cold water swimming. Campbell has described himself as a pro-faith atheist.

== Stage and screen portrayals ==
Bremner, Bird and Fortune often satirised Campbell during the Blair years. In 2005, Campbell was played by Jonathan Cake in the Channel 4 television film The Government Inspector, based on the David Kelly Case. The following year, he was portrayed by Mark Bazeley in the Stephen Frears film The Queen – a role reprised by Bazeley in 2010 follow-up The Special Relationship. Alex Jennings portrayed Campbell in the television drama A Very Social Secretary. He featured in Dead Ringers and was portrayed by Adam Damerell in season 6 of The Crown. Campbell has been cited as the inspiration for the character of Malcolm Tucker in the BBC political satire comedy The Thick of It.

== Television appearances ==
In 2006 and 2007, Campbell took part in Soccer Aid as part of the Rest of the World team. He appeared with Diego Maradona and Paul Gascoigne to raise money for UNICEF. Also in 2007, he appeared on Comic Relief Does The Apprentice.

Campbell appeared as a mentor in the BBC Two series The Speaker in April 2009, offering his advice on persuasive speaking.

Campbell appeared on BBC's Top Gear in July 2010, where he was booed by some members of the audience but set a time of 1:47 around the Top Gear test track in the Star in a Reasonably-Priced Car segment.

Campbell also took part in the 2011 Channel 4 television series Jamie's Dream School. In June 2012, he was guest presenter of Have I Got News for You.

Campbell presented and narrated the 20 February 2012 edition of the BBC current affairs programme Panorama, which was entitled "Britain's Hidden Alcoholics".

In 2012, Campbell made his first appearance in an acting role with a small part in an episode of the BBC drama Accused.

In November 2021 Campbell was featured in the BBC series Winter Walks, walking in the Yorkshire Dales along Ribblesdale, from a waterfall above the market town of Settle, to Catrigg Force near Stainforth, 5 mi (8.0 km) to the North.

In May 2022 it was announced that Campbell would appear in the Channel 4 political entertainment series Make Me Prime Minister, due to broadcast at the end of September 2022.

In May 2023, Campbell was involved in a heated debate with Alex Phillips, a member of Reform UK, on BBC Newsnight. Phillips later accused Campbell of "bullying, intimidation and thinly veiled misogyny". He later apologised to the presenter, Victoria Derbyshire, for his behaviour.

== Honours ==
- Honorary Fellowship of the Royal College of Psychiatrists (6 November 2017)
- Gold Medal of Honorary Patronage by the Philosophical Society, Trinity College Dublin (16 October 2019)

== Published books ==
- The Blair Years. Arrow. 2008. ISBN 978-0-09-951475-6.
- All in the Mind. Hutchinson. 2008. ISBN 978-0-09-192578-9.
- Maya. Hutchinson. 2010. ISBN 978-0-09-193087-5.
- Diaries Volume One: Prelude to Power 1994–1997. Hutchinson. 2010. ISBN 978-0-09-179726-3.
- Diaries Volume Two: Power and the People 1997–1999. Hutchinson. 2011. ISBN 978-0-09-949346-4.
- Diaries Volume Three: Power and Responsibility 1999–2001. Hutchinson. 2012. ISBN 978-0-09-949347-1.
- The Burden of Power: Countdown to Iraq. Arrow. 2013. ISBN 978-0-09-951473-2.
- The Happy Depressive: In Pursuit of Personal and Political Happiness. Arrow. 2012. ISBN 978-0-09-957982-3.
- My Name Is... Arrow. 2013. ISBN 978-0-09-9588191.
- The Irish Diaries 1994–2003. The Lilliput Press. 2013. ISBN 9781843514008.
- Winners: And How They Succeed. Pegasus. 2015. ISBN 978-1605988801.
- Diaries Volume Five: Outside, Inside 2003–2005. Biteback. 2016. ISBN 978-1-78590-061-7.
- Diaries Volume Six: From Blair to Brown 2005–2007. Biteback. 2017. ISBN 9781785900846.
- Saturday Bloody Saturday. Orion. 2018. ISBN 9781409174561.
- Diaries Volume Seven: From Crash to Defeat 2007–2010. Biteback. 2018. ISBN 9781785900853.
- Living Better: How I Learned to Survive Depression. John Murray. 2020. ISBN 9781529331844.
- Diaries Volume Eight: Rise and Fall of the Olympic Spirit, 2010–2015. Biteback. 2021. ISBN 9781785900860.
- But What Can I Do? Why Politics Has Gone So Wrong, and How You Can Help Fix It. Cornerstone. 2023. ISBN 9781529153330.
- Persevilience. Atlantic Books. 2027. ISBN 9781805468370

=== Other ===
- McDonnell, Flora, ed., Threads of Hope: Learning to Live with Depression (Short Books, 2003, ISBN 978-1-904095-35-4), with contributions by Alastair Campbell, Margaret Drabble, Wendy Cope, Andrew Solomon, Virginia Ironside, Lewis Wolpert, and Kay Redfield Jamison, Montagu Don

Government offices
Preceded by Jonathan Haslam	Downing Street Press Secretary; 1997–2000	Succeeded by Godric Smith
Preceded by Office established	Downing Street Director of Communications and Strategy; 2000–2003	Succeeded by David Hill
