= John Jennings (Burton MP) =

British politician (1903-1990)

John Charles Jennings (10 February 1903 – 17 June 1990) was a Conservative Party politician in the United Kingdom. He was the member of parliament (MP) for Burton from the 1955 general election until his retirement at the February 1974 general election.

Parliament of the United Kingdom
Preceded by Arthur Colegate	Member of Parliament for Burton; 1955–1974	Succeeded by Ivan Lawrence
