= Simon Lewis (public relations officer) =

British businessman

Simon Lewis OBE

Downing Street Director of Communications
- In office 16 June 2009 – 11 May 2010
- Prime Minister: Gordon Brown
- Preceded by: Michael Ellam
- Succeeded by: Andy Coulson

Personal details
- Born: Simon David Lewis; 6 May 1959 (age 66)
- Occupation: Communications advisor, chief executive

Simon David Lewis OBE (born 8 May 1959) is the former chief executive of the Association for Financial Markets in Europe. He was formerly Director of Communications for the former Labour Prime Minister Gordon Brown. He previously held this position for the Queen, Vodafone, and Centrica. He attended Whitefield School before studying PPE at Brasenose College, Oxford.

Lewis was appointed an OBE in the 2014 New Year Honours List for public service and services to international education through the Fulbright Commission.

His brother is former Telegraph editor-in-chief Will Lewis.

== Career history ==
Lewis has held down a number of positions.

- September 2010 Chief executive of the Association for Financial Markets in Europe
- 2009 Downing Street Director of Communications
- 2004 Group director of corporate affairs, Vodafone
- 2004 Director of comms and public policy, Centrica
- 2000 MD Europe, Centrica
- 1998 Communications secretary to The Queen (secondment)
- 1996 Director of corporate affairs, British Gas/Centrica
- 1992 Director of corporate affairs, NatWest
- 1987 Head of PR, SG Warburg & Co
- 1986 Head of PR, Social Democratic Party (UK)

Government offices
Preceded by Michael Ellam	Downing Street Director of Communications; 2009 - 2010	Succeeded by Andy Coulson
