= Burton and Uttoxeter =

Parliamentary constituency in the United Kingdom, 1885 onwards

Coordinates: 52.87°N 1.83°W

- County constituency for the House of Commons
- Interactive map of boundaries from 2024
- Boundary of Burton and Uttoxeter in West Midlands region
- County: Staffordshire
- Population: 102,731 (2011 census)
- Electorate: 75,460 (2023)
- Major settlements: Burton upon Trent and Uttoxeter

Current constituency
- Created: 1885 (as Burton)
- Member of Parliament: Jacob Collier (Labour)
- Seats: One
- Created from: East Staffordshire and North Staffordshire

Burton and Uttoxeter is a constituency (Note: A county constituency (for the purposes of election expenses and type of returning officer)) represented in the House of Commons of the Parliament of the United Kingdom since 2024 by Jacob Collier of the Labour Party. (Note: As with all constituencies, the constituency elects one Member of Parliament (MP) by the first past the post system of election at least every five years.)

Although the constituency had always, since its creation in 1918, contained the town of Uttoxeter, it was formally known as Burton until the 2024 general election. Further to the 2023 Periodic Review of Westminster constituencies, there were no changes to the constituency boundaries, but the Boundary Commission for England recommended that it be renamed Burton and Uttoxeter.

== Constituency profile ==
The Burton and Uttoxeter constituency is located in Staffordshire and covers most of the East Staffordshire district. It includes the large town of Burton upon Trent with a population of around 76,000, the small market town of Uttoxeter and a large rural area with many smaller villages. Burton is a major centre for brewing and contains eight breweries. Burton has areas of high deprivation whilst the rural parts of the constituency are wealthier.

Levels of education, professional employment and income in the constituency are slightly lower than national averages. White people make up 85% of the population, a figure similar to the country as a whole, with Asians—primarily Pakistanis—forming 10%. Most of the constituency is represented by Reform UK councillors at the county council level, whilst at district council level the two towns of Burton and Uttoxeter elected mostly Labour Party councillors with the rural areas electing Conservatives. Voters in the constituency strongly supported leaving the European Union in the 2016 referendum; an estimated 64% supported Brexit compared to 52% nationwide.

== Boundaries ==
=== Historic (Burton) ===
1918–1950: The County Borough of Burton, the Urban District of Uttoxeter, the Rural Districts of Tutbury and Uttoxeter, and part of the Rural District of Stafford.

1950–1983: The County Borough of Burton, the Urban District of Uttoxeter, and the Rural Districts of Tutbury and Uttoxeter.

1983–1997: The District of East Staffordshire

1997–2010: All the wards of the Borough of East Staffordshire except the Bagots and Yoxall wards.

2010–2024: As above, less the Needwood ward.

=== Current (Burton and Uttoxeter) ===
Under the 2023 Periodic Review of Westminster constituencies, which was based on the ward structure in place on 1 December 2020, the contents of the newly named constituency were unchanged from the previous Burton seat.

Following a local government boundary review which came into effect in May 2023, the constituency currently comprises the following wards or part wards of the Borough of East Staffordshire:

- Anglesey; Blythe (except Kingstone parish); Branston; Brizlincote; Burton & Eton; Crown (except Newborough parish); Dove; Heath; Horninglow & Outwoods; Shobnall; Stapenhill; Stramshall & Weaver; Stretton; Town; Winshill.

This constituency covers most of the East Staffordshire district. The main town is Burton upon Trent, while it also includes Uttoxeter, Tutbury and Rocester. The remaining small part of East Staffordshire, the area around Abbots Bromley and Yoxall, and, from the 2010 general election (following a review by the Boundary Commission for England), the Needwood ward (containing the village of Barton-under-Needwood), is in the Lichfield constituency.

== History ==
The constituency was created in 1885 replacing the previous East Staffordshire and North Staffordshire constituencies. Burton upon Trent is a centre of the brewing industry and for sixty years from 1885 to 1945, the MPs were from brewery-owning families. Despite the working class nature of Burton upon Trent from 1950 to 1997, the seat was held by the Conservative Party, albeit often with relatively small majorities. Traditionally the brewing industry has been a strong supporter of the Conservative Party. However, like many traditionally Conservative seats, it was lost to the Labour Party at the 1997 general election, which they won in a landslide. Janet Dean retained the seat until 2010, when the Conservative Andrew Griffiths retook it.

Griffiths retained the seat at the 2015 and 2017 general elections. In July 2018, he was suspended by the Conservative Party following allegations that he had sent up to 2,000 sexually explicit text messages to two female constituents. Although the whip was reinstated in December 2018, he was not reselected to fight the seat at the 2019 general election, with local party members instead choosing his estranged wife, Kate. She was duly elected and, in 2022, reverted to her maiden name of Kate Kniveton. At the 2024 election, Kniveton was defeated by Jacob Collier of the Labour Party.

== Members of Parliament ==
Year	Member	Party
1885	Sir Michael Bass	Liberal
1886 by-election	Sydney Evershed	Liberal
1900	Robert Ratcliff	Liberal Unionist
1912	Robert Ratcliff	Unionist
1918	John Gretton, 1st Baron Gretton	Unionist
1943	John Gretton, 2nd Baron Gretton	Conservative
1945	Arthur W. Lyne	Labour
1950	Arthur Colegate	Conservative
1955	John Jennings	Conservative
1974	Ivan Lawrence	Conservative
1997	Janet Dean	Labour
2010	Andrew Griffiths	Conservative
2018	Andrew Griffiths	Independent
2018	Andrew Griffiths	Conservative
2019	Kate Kniveton	Conservative
2024	Jacob Collier	Labour

== Elections ==
=== Elections in the 2020s ===
General election 2024: Burton and Uttoxeter
Party	Candidate	Votes	%	±%
Labour	Jacob Collier	16,222	35.6	+4.7
Conservative	Kate Kniveton	13,956	30.6	−30.1
Reform	James Bush	9,611	21.1	N/A
Green	Anna Westwood	2,119	4.6	+1.7
Workers Party	Azmat Mir	2,056	4.5	N/A
Liberal Democrats	Sarah Murray	1,663	3.6	−1.9
Majority		2,266	5.0	N/A
Turnout		45,627	58.5	▼6.1
Labour gain from Conservative		Swing	▲17.4	

=== Elections in the 2010s ===
General election 2019: Burton
Party	Candidate	Votes	%	±%
Conservative	Kate Griffiths	29,560	60.7	▲2.7
Labour	Louise Walker	15,064	30.9	▼6.9
Liberal Democrats	Adam Wain	2,681	5.5	▲3.0
Green	Kate Copeland	1,433	2.9	▲1.2
Majority		14,496	29.8	▲9.6
Turnout		48,738	65.0	▼2.5
Conservative hold		Swing	▲4.8	

General election 2017: Burton
Party	Candidate	Votes	%	±%
Conservative	Andrew Griffiths	28,936	58.0	▲8.2
Labour	John McKiernan	18,889	37.8	▲10.5
Liberal Democrats	Dominic Hardwick	1,262	2.5	0.0
Green	Simon Hales	824	1.7	▼0.8
Majority		10,047	20.2	▼2.3
Turnout		49,911	67.5	▲2.0
Conservative hold		Swing	▼1.3	

General election 2015: Burton
Party	Candidate	Votes	%	±%
Conservative	Andrew Griffiths	24,376	49.8	▲5.3
Labour	Jon Wheale	13,484	27.3	▼4.4
UKIP	Mike Green	8,658	17.5	▲14.6
Liberal Democrats	David MacDonald	1,232	2.5	▼13.3
Green	Samantha Patrone	1,224	2.5	New
Majority		11,252	22.5	▲10.9
Turnout		49,334	65.5	▼1.0
Conservative hold		Swing	▲4.9	

General election 2010: Burton
Party	Candidate	Votes	%	±%
Conservative	Andrew Griffiths	22,188	44.5	▲7.2
Labour	Ruth Smeeth	15,884	31.9	▼10.2
Liberal Democrats	Michael Rodgers	7,891	15.8	▲3.4
BNP	Alan Hewitt	2,409	4.8	▲1.0
UKIP	Philip Lancaster	1,451	2.9	▲1.0
Majority		6,304	12.6	N/A
Turnout		49,823	66.5	▲6.1
Conservative gain from Labour		Swing	▲8.7	

=== Elections in the 2000s ===
General election 2005: Burton
Party	Candidate	Votes	%	±%
Labour	Janet Dean	19,701	41.1	▼7.9
Conservative	Adrian Pepper	18,280	38.2	▼0.4
Liberal Democrats	Sandra Johnson	6,236	13.0	▲3.4
BNP	Julie Russell	1,840	3.8	New
UKIP	Philip Lancaster	913	1.9	▼0.2
Veritas	Brian Buxton	912	1.9	New
Majority		1,421	2.9	▼7.5
Turnout		47,882	61.0	▼0.7
Labour hold		Swing		

General election 2001: Burton
Party	Candidate	Votes	%	±%
Labour	Janet Dean	22,783	49.0	▼2.0
Conservative	Maggie A. Punyer	17,934	38.6	▼0.8
Liberal Democrats	David A. Fletcher	4,468	9.6	▲1.1
UKIP	Ian E. Crompton	984	2.1	New
ProLife Alliance	John D.W. Roberts	288	0.6	New
Majority		4,849	10.4	▼1.2
Turnout		46,457	61.7	▼13.3
Labour hold		Swing		

=== Elections in the 1990s ===
General election 1997: Burton
Party	Candidate	Votes	%	±%
Labour	Janet Dean	27,810	51.0	▲11.0
Conservative	Ivan Lawrence	21,480	39.4	▼10.3
Liberal Democrats	David A. Fletcher	4,617	8.5	▼1.8
National Democrats	Keith Sharp	604	1.1	New
Majority		6,330	11.6	N/A
Turnout		54,511	75.1	▼7.4
Labour gain from Conservative		Swing	▲10.6	

General election 1992: Burton
Party	Candidate	Votes	%	±%
Conservative	Ivan Lawrence	30,845	49.7	▼1.0
Labour	Patricia K. Muddyman	24,849	40.0	▲6.4
Liberal Democrats	Rob C. Renold	6,375	10.3	▼5.4
Majority		5,996	9.7	▼7.4
Turnout		62,069	82.4	▲3.9
Conservative hold		Swing	▼3.7	

=== Elections in the 1980s ===
General election 1987: Burton
Party	Candidate	Votes	%	±%
Conservative	Ivan Lawrence	29,160	50.7	▼0.4
Labour	Dennis Heptonstall	19,330	33.6	▲3.8
Liberal	Kenneth Hemsley	9,046	15.7	▼3.4
Majority		9,830	17.1	▼4.2
Turnout		57,536	78.6	▲2.7
Conservative hold		Swing	▼2.1	

General election 1983: Burton
Party	Candidate	Votes	%	±%
Conservative	Ivan Lawrence	27,874	51.1	▼2.9
Labour	Robert Slater	16,227	29.8	▼6.5
Liberal	June Garner	10,420	19.1	▲9.4
Majority		11,647	21.3	▲3.6
Turnout		54,521	75.9	▼2.8
Conservative hold		Swing	▲1.8	

=== Elections in the 1970s ===
General election 1979: Burton
Party	Candidate	Votes	%	±%
Conservative	Ivan Lawrence	29,821	54.00	
Labour	GS Jones	20,020	36.25	
Liberal	K Stevens	5,383	9.75	
Majority		9,801	17.75	
Turnout		55,224	78.75	
Conservative hold		Swing		

General election October 1974: Burton
Party	Candidate	Votes	%	±%
Conservative	Ivan Lawrence	23,496	44.45	
Labour	David Hill	21,398	40.48	
Liberal	K Stevens	7,969	15.07	New
Majority		2,098	3.97	
Turnout		52,863	77.97	
Conservative hold		Swing		

General election February 1974: Burton
Party	Candidate	Votes	%	±%
Conservative	Ivan Lawrence	28,343	53.09	
Labour	David Hill	25,040	46.91	
Majority		3,303	6.18	
Turnout		58,383	79.48	
Conservative hold		Swing		

General election 1970: Burton
Party	Candidate	Votes	%	±%
Conservative	John Jennings	27,428	54.32	
Labour	Ronald G Truman	23,063	45.68	
Majority		4,365	8.64	
Turnout		50,491	75.60	
Conservative hold		Swing		

=== Elections in the 1960s ===
General election 1966: Burton
Party	Candidate	Votes	%	±%
Conservative	John Jennings	23,773	50.29	
Labour	Charles William Shepherd	23,496	49.71	
Majority		277	0.58	
Turnout		47,269	78.74	
Conservative hold		Swing		

General election 1964: Burton
Party	Candidate	Votes	%	±%
Conservative	John Jennings	25,236	53.24	
Labour	Thomas S Pritchard	22,161	46.76	
Majority		3,075	6.48	
Turnout		47,397	80.22	
Conservative hold		Swing		

=== Elections in the 1950s ===
General election 1959: Burton
Party	Candidate	Votes	%	±%
Conservative	John Jennings	26,926	56.14	
Labour	Edward McGarry	21,032	43.86	
Majority		5,894	12.28	
Turnout		47,958	82.36	
Conservative hold		Swing		

General election 1955: Burton
Party	Candidate	Votes	%	±%
Conservative	John Jennings	24,519	53.23	
Labour Co-op	Ewart Taylor	21,546	46.77	
Majority		2,973	6.46	
Turnout		46,065	80.78	
Conservative hold		Swing		

General election 1951: Burton
Party	Candidate	Votes	%	±%
Conservative	Arthur Colegate	24,884	50.75	
Labour	John Stonehouse	24,151	49.25	
Majority		733	1.50	
Turnout		49,035	86.31	
Conservative hold		Swing		

General election 1950: Burton
Party	Candidate	Votes	%	±%
Conservative	Arthur Colegate	24,903	51.54	
Labour	Arthur W. Lyne	23,418	48.46	
Majority		1,485	3.08	N/A
Turnout		48,321	86.05	
Conservative gain from Labour		Swing		

=== Election in the 1940s ===
General election 1945: Burton
Party	Candidate	Votes	%	±%
Labour	Arthur W. Lyne	18,288	51.06	
Conservative	John Gretton	17,528	48.94	
Majority		760	2.12	N/A
Turnout		35,816	66.84	
Labour gain from Conservative		Swing		

=== Elections in the 1930s ===
General election 1935: Burton
Party	Candidate	Votes	%	±%
Conservative	John Gretton	23,539	74.54	
Labour	Gladys Nellie Paling	8,041	25.46	
Majority		15,498	49.08	
Turnout		31,580	65.64	
Conservative hold		Swing		

General election 1931: Burton
Party	Candidate	Votes	%	±%
Conservative	John Gretton	26,117	74.73	
Labour	William Paling	8,832	25.27	
Majority		17,285	49.46	
Turnout		34,949	74.65	
Conservative hold		Swing		

=== Elections in the 1920s ===
General election 1929: Burton
Party	Candidate	Votes	%	±%
Unionist	John Gretton	18,243	52.6	−21.6
Labour	William Paling	10,511	30.3	+4.5
Liberal	Ifor Bowen Lloyd	5,943	17.1	New
Majority		7,732	22.3	−26.1
Turnout		34,697	75.3	−2.5
Registered electors		46,099		
Unionist hold		Swing	−13.1	

General election 1924: Burton
Party	Candidate	Votes	%	±%
Unionist	John Gretton	20,550	74.2	N/A
Labour	F. Thoresby	7,141	25.8	New
Majority		13,409	48.4	N/A
Turnout		27,691	77.8	N/A
Registered electors		35,599		
Unionist hold		Swing	N/A	

General election 1923: Burton
Party	Candidate	Votes	%	±%
Unionist	John Gretton	Unopposed		
Unionist hold				

General election 1922: Burton
Party	Candidate	Votes	%	±%
Unionist	John Gretton	Unopposed		
Unionist hold				

== Election results 1885–1918 ==
=== Elections in the 1910s ===
General election 1918: Burton
Party		Candidate	Votes	%	±%
C	Unionist	John Gretton	Unopposed		
	Unionist hold				
C indicates candidate endorsed by the coalition government.

General Election 1914–15: Another General Election was required to take place before the end of 1915. The political parties had been making preparations for an election to take place and by July 1914, the following candidates had been selected;

- Unionist: Robert Ratcliff
- Liberal:

General election December 1910: Burton
Party	Candidate	Votes	%	±%
Liberal Unionist	Robert Ratcliff	5,877	60.8	N/A
Liberal	Harold Rylett	3,784	39.2	New
Majority		2,093	21.6	N/A
Turnout		9,661	81.3	N/A
Registered electors		11,878		
Liberal Unionist hold		Swing	N/A	

General election January 1910: Burton
Party	Candidate	Votes	%	±%
Liberal Unionist	Robert Ratcliff	Unopposed		
Liberal Unionist hold				

=== Elections in the 1900s ===
General election 1906: Burton
Party	Candidate	Votes	%	±%
Liberal Unionist	Robert Ratcliff	5,613	55.1	−6.9
Liberal	Francis Vane	4,572	44.9	+6.9
Majority		1,041	10.2	−13.8
Turnout		10,185	88.8	+5.7
Registered electors		11,465		
Liberal Unionist hold		Swing	−6.9	

General election 1900: Burton
Party	Candidate	Votes	%	±%
Liberal Unionist	Robert Ratcliff	5,592	62.0	New
Liberal	Jabez Edward Johnson-Ferguson	3,421	38.0	N/A
Majority		2,171	24.0	N/A
Turnout		9,013	83.1	N/A
Registered electors		10,852		
Liberal Unionist gain from Liberal		Swing	N/A	

=== Elections in the 1890s ===
Evershed

General election 1892: Burton
Party	Candidate	Votes	%	±%
Liberal	Sydney Evershed	Unopposed		
Liberal hold				

General election 1895: Burton
Party	Candidate	Votes	%	±%
Liberal	Sydney Evershed	Unopposed		
Liberal hold				

=== Elections in the 1880s ===
By-election, 20 Aug 1886: Burton
Party	Candidate	Votes	%	±%
Liberal	Sydney Evershed	4,792	67.4	N/A
Conservative	Gerald Holbech Hardy	2,319	32.6	New
Majority		2,473	34.8	N/A
Turnout		7,111	75.1	N/A
Registered electors		9,463		
Liberal hold		Swing	N/A	

- Caused by Bass' elevation to the peerage, becoming Lord Burton.

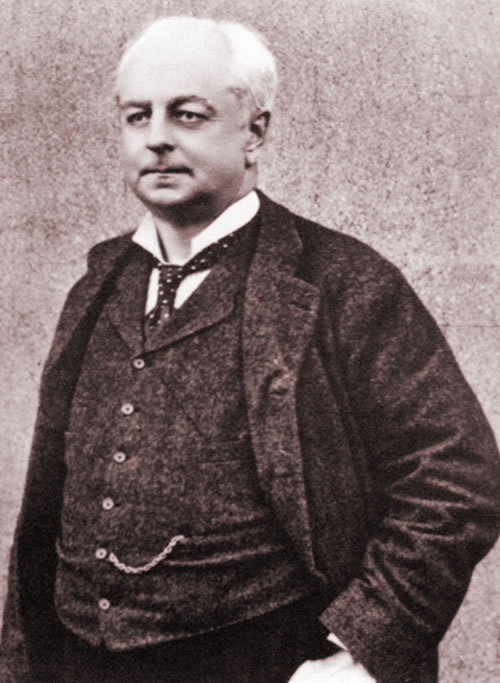
Bass

General election 1886: Burton
Party	Candidate	Votes	%	±%
Liberal	Michael Bass	Unopposed		
Liberal hold				

General election 1885: Burton
Party	Candidate	Votes	%	±%
Liberal	Michael Bass	5,395	68.0	
Conservative	Gerald Holbech Hardy	2,543	32.0	
Majority		2,852	36.0	
Turnout		7,938	83.9	
Registered electors		9,463		
Liberal win (new seat)				

== See also ==
- List of parliamentary constituencies in Staffordshire
