= David Hill (Labour adviser) =

British political adviser (1948–2024)

Downing Street Director of Communications
- In office 2003–2007
- Prime Minister: Tony Blair
- Preceded by: Alastair Campbell
- Succeeded by: Michael Ellam

Personal details
- Born: David Roland Hill; 1 February 1948 Birmingham, England
- Died: 4 November 2024 (aged 76)
- Domestic partner: Hilary Coffman
- Education: King Edward's School
- Alma mater: Brasenose College, Oxford

David Roland Hill (1 February 1948 – 4 November 2024) was a British political adviser who served as Alastair Campbell's replacement as Director of Communications for Tony Blair, from 2003 to 2007.

== Life and career ==
A native of Birmingham, Hill was educated at King Edward's School and studied at Brasenose College, Oxford. Hill returned to Birmingham as an industrial relations officer for Unigate after studying at Oxford. He later worked for Roy Hattersley and contested the Burton constituency unsuccessfully as a Labour party candidate in both of the 1974 general elections.

Hill was the Labour Party's Director of Communications from 1991 to 1997. He became Director of Communications under Prime Minister Tony Blair in 2003. Blair sought assurances from Hill after expecting onslaught after the Iraq War. After leaving Downing Street in 2007, Hill worked for Bell Pottinger.

=== Personal life and death ===
Hill's long-term partner was Hilary Coffman, a press officer at Downing Street who worked for Neil Kinnock. Hill died from pneumonia on 4 November 2024, at the age of 76.

Government offices
| Preceded by Alastair Campbell | Downing Street Director of Communications; 2003–2007 | Succeeded by Michael Ellam |
