= Grace Campbell (comedian) =

British comedian

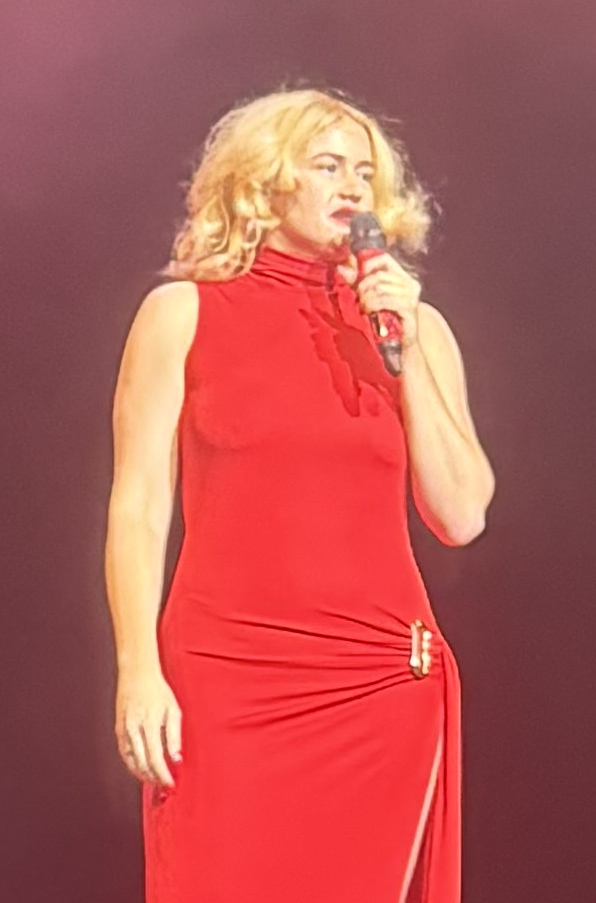
- Campbell in 2024
- Education: Parliament Hill School
- Occupation: Comedian
- Parent(s): Alastair Campbell; Fiona Millar
- Website: Official website

Grace Campbell is a British comedian, filmmaker, writer and presenter. As a stand-up comedian she has performed solo shows at the Edinburgh Festival Fringe and the Hammersmith Apollo. She has appeared on Channel 4's Riot Girls. Her first book, Amazing Disgrace: A Book About "Shame", was released by Hodder in 2021.

== Early life and education ==
Campbell's father, Alastair Campbell, started working for Tony Blair soon after she was born. Her mother, Fiona Millar, worked for Cherie Blair. She spent her childhood in the New Labour movement, with the children of Blair and Philip Gould, and the grandchildren of Neil Kinnock. She has said she became “more liberal than [her] father and more feminist than [her] mother,” that her experience of politics as a child was “quite brutal”, and that she grew up with protesters outside her house and needed security. Campbell attended Parliament Hill School, and felt she benefited from an all-girls environment. While Tessa Jowell was her childhood inspiration, Campbell has said that Ed Miliband has the best sense of humour. She was a frequent visitor to the Brandon Centre, a youth centre in Kentish Town, where she is now a patron.

== Career ==
Campbell is a feminist. She explained to Varsity that “women love [my stand-up]...they feel seen. They feel like I'm speaking to them and their friends,”. In 2019, she toured the stand-up show "Why I'm Never Going Into Politics", where she revealed that her mother was her inspiration. She performed All About Me(n) at the Edinburgh Festival Fringe in 2022.

Campbell was a writer and star of Riot Girls, a Channel 4 show that used stunts and sketches to discuss how women were treated in society.

Campbell's first book, Amazing Disgrace: A Book About "Shame", was published by Hodder & Stoughton in 2021. The book explores her relationship with shame, whether that be shame about rejection, sex or mental health. Times Radio described Amazing Disgrace as a “revealing and amusing memoir”, whilst the Evening Standard said it was “an absolute riot. Brash, candid and casually obscene, this part memoir, part manual is a high octane adventure”.

=== Activism ===
During a trip to Las Vegas, Campbell was the victim of rape. She described her experience in The Guardian, and how she felt resentful of her previously “sex-positive” reputation in the immediate aftermath. She has written about how having an abortion affected her “on a physiological and psychological level”.
