= Destination Maternity =

American clothing company

Destination Maternity Corporation
- Formerly: Mother's Work, Inc.
- Company type: Private
- Traded as: Nasdaq: DEST
- Industry: Retail
- Founded: 1982; 44 years ago, in Moorestown, New Jersey, U.S.
- Headquarters: Moorestown, New Jersey, U.S.
- Products: Clothing; Maternity Clothing
- Owner: Marquee Brands
- Subsidiaries: Motherhood Maternity; A Pea in the Pod
- Website: destinationmaternitycorp.com

Destination Maternity Corporation (formerly Mothers Work, Inc.) is the world's largest designer and retailer of maternity apparel, based in Moorestown, New Jersey.

On October 21, 2019, Destination Maternity filed for Chapter 11 bankruptcy protection, blaming increased competition and struggles with long-term debt as reasons contributed to the filing. The company announced the closure of 210 locations across its 3 brands. By the end of March 2020, all stores quietly closed.

As of July 1, 2020, Maternity IP Holdings, formerly Destination Maternity, operates Motherhood.com and APeaInThePod.com, under the trade names Motherhood Maternity and A Pea in the Pod, and has wholesale relationships. It is owned by a subsidiary of Marquee Brands.

== Brands ==
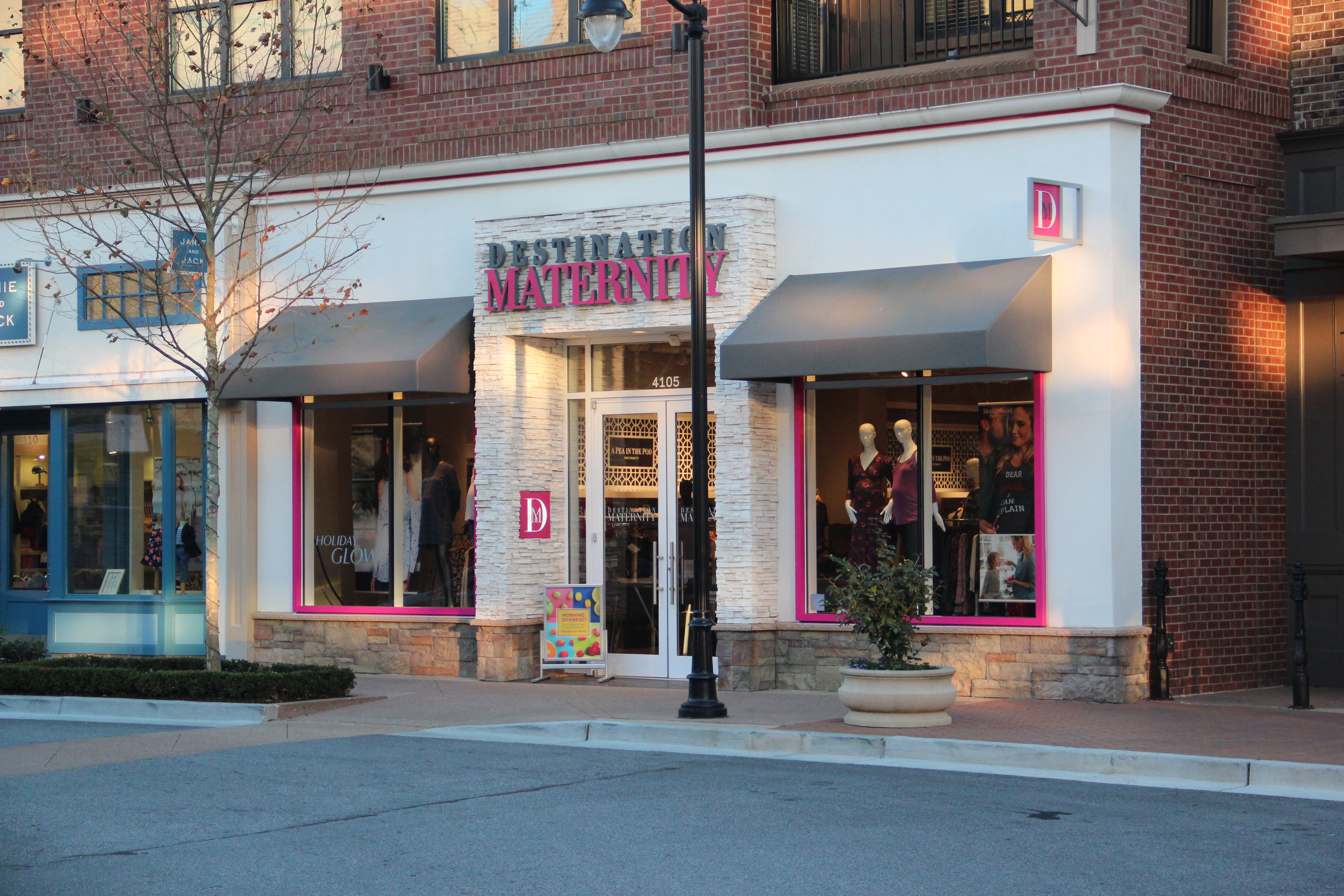
A Destination Maternity in Avalon, Alpharetta, Georgia

Destination Maternity Corporation currently operates the following retail brands:

- Motherhood Maternity,
- A Pea in the Pod

== Collections ==
In 2009, Destination Maternity partnered with the National Football League to offer NFL football maternity t-shirts, sweatpants, and baby clothes at Motherhood Maternity stores. In 2010, a similar partnership was announced to offer MLB baseball maternity t-shirts and baby clothes.

In 2010, Destination Maternity launched two maternity-wear collections from Heidi Klum. Lavish by Heidi Klum for A Pea in the Pod features more high-end items, while Loved by Heidi Klum for Motherhood Maternity features affordable options.

In 2012, the company launched a maternity clothing collection from Jessica Simpson, "available in 700 retail locations, including Motherhood Maternity, Destination Maternity, as well as Destination Maternity shop-in-shops within Macy’s.".

Other recent collaborations include a collection from Nicole Richie in 2009, a collection from Disney in 2010 and a collection for Rosie Pope in 2012. In 2015, A Pea in the Pod collaborated with Rachel Zoe and worked with Molly Sims on their exclusive LED (Luxe Essentials Denim) Collection.
