= Jacob Collier (politician) =

British politician

Jacob Collier MP
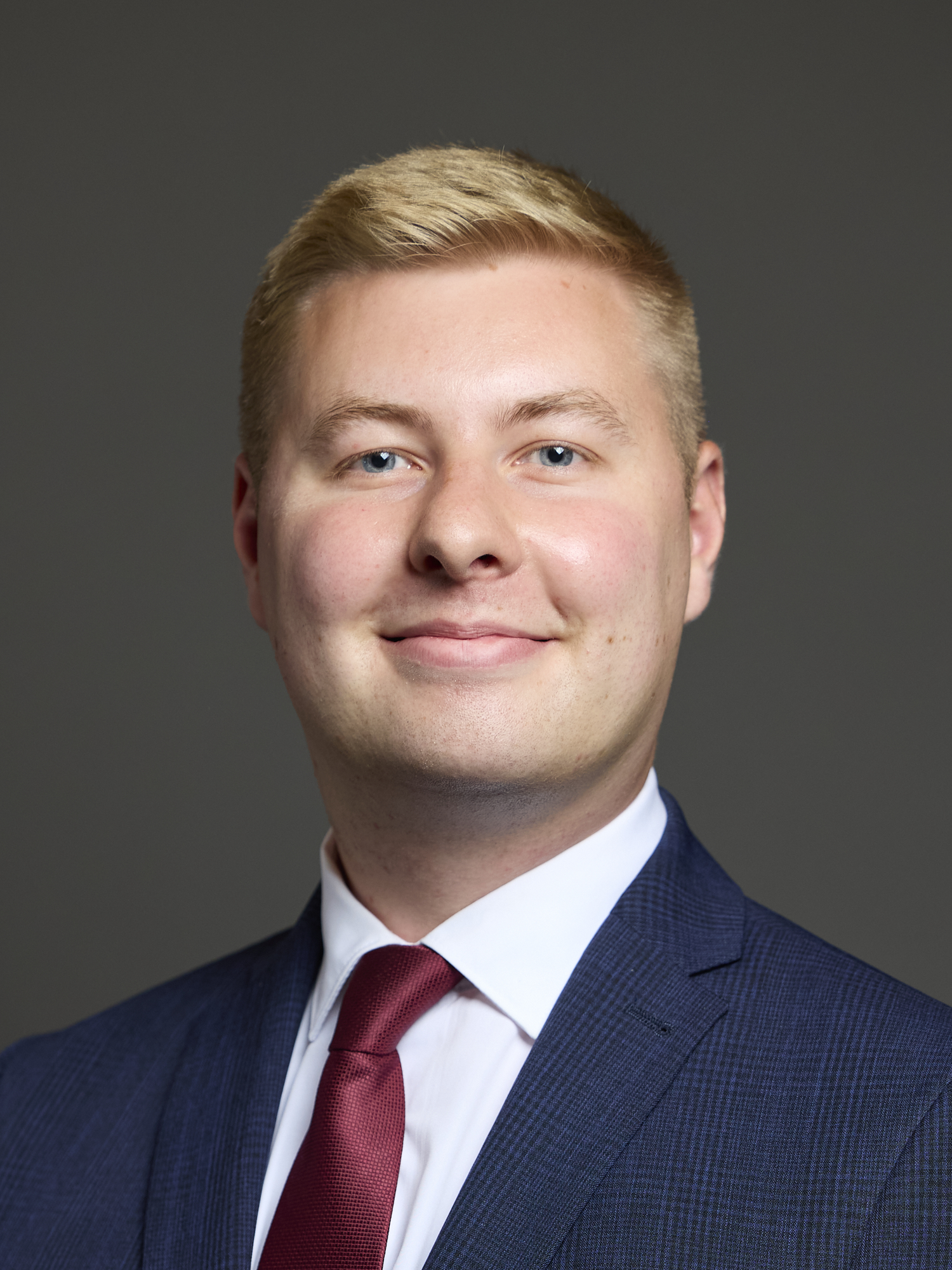
- Official portrait, 2024

Member of Parliament for Burton and Uttoxeter
- Incumbent
- Assumed office 4 July 2024
- Preceded by: Kate Kniveton
- Majority: 2,266 (5.0%)

Personal details
- Born: 20 May 1997 (age 29) Burton upon Trent, Staffordshire, England
- Party: Labour
- Education: University of Nottingham

Jacob Bracewell Collier (born 20 May 1997) is a British Labour Party politician who has been Member of Parliament for Burton and Uttoxeter since 2024.

== Early life ==
Jacob Collier was born in Burton upon Trent in 1997 and grew up in Stretton. He attended William Shrewsbury Primary School and The de Ferrers Academy. He read History and Politics at the University of Nottingham. Collier was elected as Community Officer for the University of Nottingham Students' Union. He became chair of Nottingham Labour Students before graduating in 2018.

Collier worked in communications for Thera, a charity working with people with learning disabilities and from 2021 was a communications officer at the Nottinghamshire Fire and Rescue Service, where he was also a union representative for Unison.

== Political career ==
Collier was elected as MP for Burton and Uttoxeter at the general election in July 2024 with a 2,266 majority, gaining the seat from the Conservatives.

Parliament of the United Kingdom
| New constituency | Member of Parliament for Burton and Uttoxeter; 2024–present | Incumbent |
