= Robert Ratcliff =

British politician

Colonel Robert Frederick Ratcliff CMG VD (1867 – 19 January 1943) was an English brewer, Territorial Army officer and politician who represented Burton from 1900 to 1918.

Born in Burton-on-Trent, Ratcliff was the son of Robert Ratcliff and his wife Emily. His father was a brewer in the partnership of Bass Ratcliff and Gretton and lived at Newton Solney in south Derbyshire. He was educated at Rossall School and Cambridge University. Ratcliff followed his father into the brewery and was also an active member of the territorial reserve. He was commissioned into the 2nd Volunteer Battalion of the 5th Staffordshire Rifle Volunteer Corps on 19 March 1887, as a Second-Lieutenant serving with "B" Company at Burton. He was promoted to lieutenant on 27 July 1889, captain on 23 January 1892, and major 18 July 1900.

In 1900, Ratcliff was elected as Liberal Unionist Member of Parliament for Burton. With the reformation of the Territorial reserves he became honorary lieutenant-colonel of the 6th North Staffordshire Regiment on 21 September 1907 and succeeded John Gretton as lieutenant-colonel in command of the 6th North Staffords on 18 November 1909. In 1912 he changed his parliamentary allegiance and became Conservative MP for Burton.

On the outbreak World War I the reserves were mobilised, and on 20 May 1915, he took command of the 1/6 North Staffordshires. The battalion saw heavy fighting in the Battle of Loos at the Hohenzollern Redoubt. Ratcliff was made a Companion of the Order of St Michael and St George in the 1916 Birthday Honours for his services in the war.

Ratcliff gave up his parliamentary seat in 1918. He maintained his links with the Territorial Army and when it was reformed in 1921, Ratcliff was again in command of the 6th North Staffords until 1924. He was on the committee of the County Territorial Army Association from 1922 to 1925. He served as High Sheriff of Derbyshire in 1929. Among his charitable activities, he built the village hall at Newton Solney.

Parliament of the United Kingdom
Preceded by Sydney Evershed	Member of Parliament for Burton; 1900–1918	Succeeded by John Gretton
Honorary titles
Preceded by John Drury-Lowe	High Sheriff of Derbyshire; 1929–1930	Succeeded by Sir Ian Walker, Bt
