= Kate Kniveton =

British politician

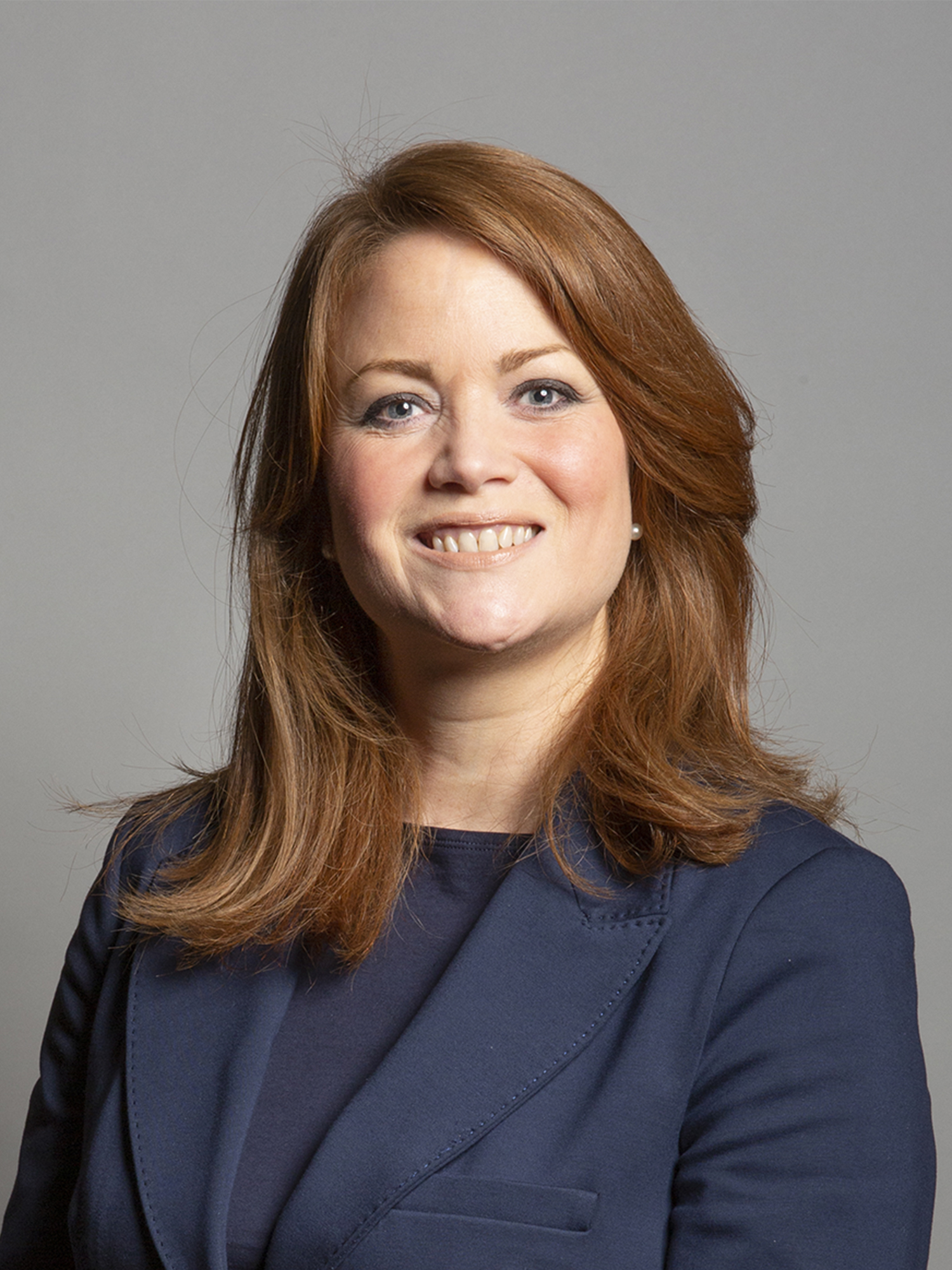
- Official portrait, 2019

Member of Parliament for Burton
- In office 12 December 2019 – 30 May 2024
- Preceded by: Andrew Griffiths
- Succeeded by: Jacob Collier

Personal details
- Born: Kate Elizabeth Kniveton; 1971 (age 54–55) Burton upon Trent, Staffordshire, England
- Party: Conservative
- Spouse: Andrew Griffiths (m. 2013; div. 2018)
- Education: Derby High School, Derbyshire; University of Exeter (BA)

Kate Elizabeth Kniveton (previously Griffiths; born 1971) is a British politician who served as the Member of Parliament (MP) for Burton in Staffordshire between 2019 and 2024. She is a member of the Conservative Party. She was elected to Parliament under her married name of Griffiths but reverted to using her maiden name in 2022.

== Early life and career ==
Kate Elizabeth Kniveton was born in Burton upon Trent. She was privately educated at St. Wystan's School in Repton and Derby High School, before studying classics at the University of Exeter. She worked for five years as the corporate hospitality coordinator for the football club Burton Albion FC.

== Political career ==
After her ex-husband, Andrew, stood for reselection as the Conservative candidate for Burton in the 2019 general election, Kniveton stood against him but the vote ended in a tie. He then withdrew his candidacy rather than face a second vote in which he would face other candidates including his estranged wife. She was selected in the subsequent contest. Her campaign focused on promises on local issues such as investment in the local area's high streets, and national issues including Brexit. She also pledged to be an advocate for domestic abuse survivors.

Kniveton was elected as MP for Burton at the 2019 general election with a majority of 14,496 and 60.7% of the vote. Kniveton opposed the proposed MP pay rise in 2020, which was eventually scrapped. She lost her seat in the 2024 general election.

== Personal life ==
Kniveton married Burton MP Andrew Griffiths in 2013. They had a daughter in 2018. He resigned as the small businesses minister and was suspended from the Conservative Party after The Sunday Mirror reported that he had sent up to 2,000 sexually explicit text messages over a three-week period in 2018 to two women. Kniveton reported that she left him the day that he had told her about it, and that she had later started divorce proceedings.

They separated in 2018 and subsequently divorced.

In December 2021 it was revealed that a Family Court judge had ruled that Kniveton had been repeatedly raped and sexually assaulted by her then husband. Family Court decisions are not usually publicised and, as a complainant in a case of alleged sexual misconduct, Kate Kniveton had a statutory right of anonymity. However she waived that right of anonymity and in July 2021 a High Court judge (Lieven J), on appeal from the Family Court at first instance, ruled that the public interest was served by permitting publication of aspects of the Family Court's findings. This decision was upheld on 10 December 2021 by the Court of Appeal.

In February 2024, the High Court ruled against Griffiths spending time with his child with Kniveton. She wants a ban on domestic abusers seeing their children.

Parliament of the United Kingdom
Preceded by Andrew Griffiths	Member of Parliament for Burton; 2019–2024	Constituency abolished
