= Pregnant in Heels =

American television series

- Genre: Reality
- Starring: Rosie Pope
- Country of origin: United States
- Original language: English
- No. of seasons: 2
- No. of episodes: 18

Production
- Executive producers: Danielle King; Gerette Allegra; Megan Estrada; Michael Rourke
- Running time: 42 minutes
- Production company: Hud:son Media

Original release
- Network: Bravo
- Release: April 5, 2011 – July 17, 2012

Pregnant in Heels is an American reality television series on Bravo that premiered on April 5, 2011. In September 2011, Bravo announced a second season renewal of the series, with the second season debuting on May 15, 2012. The show has since been cancelled.

== Premise ==
The series follows fashion designer Rosie Pope as she helps expectant mothers through her maternity concierge service. She also owns a couture maternity clothing boutique, Rosie Pope Maternity, and runs MomPrep, a training course for expectant mothers. Employees Hannah and LT assist Rosie with running the store while Rosie designs clothing and helps pregnant mothers with their odd baby needs.

== Episodes ==
=== Series overview ===
Season	Episodes	Originally released	
Season	Episodes	First released	Last released
1	8	April 5, 2011	May 24, 2011
2	10	May 15, 2012	July 17, 2012

=== Season 1 (2011) ===
No. overall	No. in season	Title	Original release date	U.S. viewers (millions)
1	1	"Rope Pope, Maternity Concierge"	April 5, 2011	0.53
2	2	"Bedroom Rules"	April 12, 2011	0.48
3	3	"Baby Bump Bridezilla"	April 19, 2011	0.67
4	4	"Clueless"	April 26, 2011	N/A
5	5	"Runaway Pregnancy"	May 3, 2011	0.66
6	6	"Birth-a-phobia"	May 10, 2011	0.46
7	7	"Couples Therapy"	May 17, 2011	0.71
8	8	"Daddy Boot Camp"	May 24, 2011	0.61

=== Season 2 (2012) ===
No. overall	No. in season	Title	Original release date	U.S. viewers (millions)
9	1	"Homebirth With a Side of Placenta"	May 15, 2012	0.73
10	2	"Taming the Tiger and the Terror"	May 22, 2012	0.76
11	3	"When Baby Robots Attack"	May 29, 2012	0.76
12	4	"The Trouble With Twins"	June 5, 2012	0.79
13	5	"Rosie's Relationship Retreat"	June 12, 2012	0.65
14	6	"Dressing the Diva"	June 19, 2012	0.71
15	7	"Welcome to Hollywood!"	June 26, 2012	0.93
16	8	"The Pregnancy Dating Dilemma"	July 3, 2012	0.40
17	9	"The Case of the Ghost Infested Nursery"	July 10, 2012	0.81
18	10	"A Labor of Love: Rosie Gives Birth"	July 17, 2012	0.63
