= Arthur W. Lyne =

British politician (1884–1971)

Arthur William Lyne (21 July 1884 – 30 December 1971) was a British politician. He was Labour Member of Parliament (MP) for Burton from 1945 to 1950.

Parliament of the United Kingdom
| Preceded by John Gretton | Member of Parliament for Burton; 1945 – 1950 | Succeeded by Arthur Colegate |
