= Janet Dean =

British Labour Party politician

Member of Parliament for Burton
- In office 1 May 1997 – 12 April 2010
- Preceded by: Ivan Lawrence
- Succeeded by: Andrew Griffiths

Personal details
- Born: 28 January 1949 (age 77) Crewe, Cheshire, England
- Party: Labour
- Spouse: Alan Dean
- Website: http://www.janetdean.info/

Janet Elizabeth Ann Dean (née Gibson; born 28 January 1949) is a British Labour Party politician who was the Member of Parliament (MP) for Burton from 1997 to 2010.

== Early life ==
Born Janet Gibson in Crewe, she was educated at the Verdin Grammar School in Winsford. On leaving school in 1965 she became a clerk at Barclays Bank, before moving to Bass Charrington in 1969.

== Politics ==
She was elected as a councillor to the Staffordshire County Council in 1981 and to the East Staffordshire District Council in 1991, becoming its mayor in 1996. She was also elected to the Uttoxeter Town Council in 1995. She stepped down from all three councils on her election to Parliament.

Dean was selected to stand for election for Labour through an all-women shortlist. She was elected to the House of Commons in the 1997 general election, winning Burton from the sitting Conservative MP, Ivan Lawrence, by 6,330 votes. She made her maiden speech on 30 July 1997. In Parliament, Dean was a member of the Catering Select committee from her election until 2005. Dean was a member of the Home Affairs Select Committee from 1999, and since the 2005 general election, she has also been a member of the Speaker's Panel of Chairmen.

She was a loyal backbencher although rebelling against the privatisation of air traffic control in 2000, a local issue given the proximity of her constituency to the East Midlands Airport. She was the chairperson of the All-Party Parliamentary Group for Lupus – an issue close to her heart, as both her mother and husband died from it.

On 20 June 2007, Dean announced her intention to stand down at the next general election. Her seat was gained by Andrew Griffiths of the Conservative Party.

== Personal life ==
She married Alan Dean in 1968 and became a full-time mother in 1970 following the birth of the first of their two daughters. She was widowed in 1994.

Parliament of the United Kingdom
Preceded by Ivan Lawrence	Member of Parliament for Burton; 1997–2010	Succeeded by Andrew Griffiths
