= Rosie Pope =

British-born American entrepreneur (born 1980)

- Born: January 1, 1980 (age 46); London, England
- Education: The London Contemporary School of Dance, Alvin Ailey American Dance Center, Columbia University
- Occupations: Fashion designer, Maternity concierge, TV personality, Dancer, Model
- Years active: 2008–present
- Spouse(s): Daron Pope (2006–present; 4 children)
- Website: https://www.rosiepope.com/

Rosie Pope (born January 1, 1980) is a British-born American entrepreneur. She was born in 1980 in London, England. She founded the Rosie Pope Maternity clothing store and lifestyle brand, as well as MomPrep parent education service, to cater to well-to-do expecting parents. She is best known for her Bravo reality show, Pregnant in Heels, which showed Pope doing everything from helping expectant mothers choose a maternity wardrobe, to teaching them about making their home safe for children, to resolving conflicts with a spouse over child-rearing.

== Early life ==
Rosie Pope was born in London. Her parents stopped living together when she was very young .

== Education ==
Pope attended the Parliament Hill School in north London and studied with the youth division of The London Contemporary School of Dance. She was offered a place at Edinburgh Medical School when she was 18 years old but instead auditioned for and was accepted to the Alvin Ailey American Dance Center in New York. During this time, she was also modeling and worked with Steve Miesel and Italian Vogue. After sustaining an injury, she went to Columbia University to study neuroscience.

== Career ==
While pregnant with her first child, Pope took a job part-time at A Pea in the Pod in order to learn more about the maternity clothing design business. In 2008, Pope founded Rosie Pope Maternity, a clothing store that caters to women who are expecting a child. Its flagship store is located in New York, with another store in Santa Monica, California. In 2010, she founded MomPrep, which includes prenatal, postpartum and wellness education classes In 2010, Bravo TV began filming the reality show Pregnant in Heels, which shows Pope as she works as a maternity concierge for expecting millionaire parents. She charges about $500 per hour for her services. Her show was launched after she was featured helping Real Housewife Bethenny Frankel prepare for her baby on the reality show Bethenny Getting Married.

Pope's book, Mommy IQ: The Complete Guide to Pregnancy was released in October 2012. She co-authored the book with her doctor.

== Personal life ==
Pope met Daron Pope while he was working for Lehman Brothers. Her father-in-law, Mike Pope, is a coach for the Dallas Cowboys. Rosie and Daron's son, James Roderick "J.R." Pope, was born in September 2008, on the same day her flagship store in New York opened. Rosie struggled to get pregnant with her second child, Wellington "Wells" Reade, born February 5, 2011. She underwent in vitro fertilization treatments and had one of her fallopian tubes removed in the process. Six months after having Wellington, Pope received news from her doctor that she was pregnant again. On May 13, 2012, Vivienne Madison Pope was born. On March 6, 2014, Rose gave birth to daughter Bridget Monroe.

On July 6, 2012, Pope became a United States citizen, after having lived in the country since she was 18 years old.

== Speech ==
Viewers and journalists have discussed Pope's speech patterns, and pondered whether or not she has a speech impairment or might be hard of hearing. For example, Starcasm's staff described Pope's speech as a "British-American accent that seem [sic] to have a little something extra going on. It doesn't quite sound like anything we've ever heard before." Additionally, Saturday Night Live spoofed both Pope's show and her accent in a sketch starring Abby Elliott, who says of her (Pope's) accent: "I was born in England, raised in America, and every morning a thousand bees sting my tongue."

OK! magazine's Valerie Nome addressed the issue with Pope in a May 24, 2011 article. Asking her whether little kids have ever questioned her voice, Rosie replied with a laugh that "Little kids have never had a problem understanding me, I have to say. I think it's funny. I never knew that's what people were going to get upset about. 'Speech impairment, lisp, what is she talking about?' As far as I know, there's nothing wrong with my tongue - however I think it's hilarious that people are talking about it."

== Claims to have been a Baroness ==
During a web interview on April 25, 2011, Rosie Pope answered a question about her statement during an episode of Pregnant in Heels that she was a Baroness:

Very complicated and the British royal family and all that craziness is almost more difficult than anyone could understand. About a decade ago, when the new Labour government came in, they made some people Lords and Ladies who were not born into the Royal Family because before that point, it had to be hereditary. My mom was one of those people which is how I got my title. My mother then later denounced [sic] her title which is why I no longer have a title. My mom did so for various political reasons, so incredibly complicated.

Her statements have been challenged as inaccurate because the titles of "Lady" or "Lord" have been created for hundreds of years outside of the Royal Family. The title of Life Peers was created in 1958; however, by definition, Life Peers do not pass their titles to their children, nor do their children automatically receive a title. Unlike the case with hereditary titles, there is no legal precedent for a Life Peer giving up a title.
