= Michael Ellam =

British banker and former civil servant

Michael Ellam CB
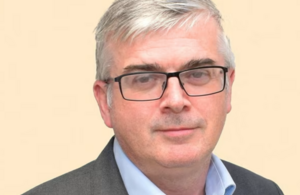

Second Permanent Secretary in the Cabinet Office, European Union and International Economic Affairs
- Incumbent
- Assumed office 13 January 2025
- Monarchs: Elizabeth II; Charles III
- Prime Minister: Keir Starmer; Andy Burnham
- Preceded by: Office established

Downing Street Director of Communications
- In office 27 June 2007 – 1 August 2009
- Prime Minister: Gordon Brown
- Preceded by: David Hill
- Succeeded by: Simon Lewis

Chairman of the Financial Services Committee
- In office 2011–2013

Personal details
- Born: Michael James Ellam; October 4, 1968 (age 57)
- Education: University of Cambridge (M.A.); London School of Economics (MSc)
- Occupation: Banker, economist, civil servant, businessman

Michael James Ellam CB (born 4 October 1968) is a British civil servant and former banker.

== Biography ==
Ellam was educated at Forest Hill School, before studying economics at Peterhouse, Cambridge, from 1987 to 1990 and at the London School of Economics from 1990 to 1991. A career Civil Servant, he joined HM Treasury in 1993. He held a succession of posts including Private Secretary to Chancellor Kenneth Clarke, Head of Debt and Reserves Management and Director of Policy. He was appointed Director of Communications at 10 Downing Street under Gordon Brown from 2007 to 2009. In 2009, he returned to HM Treasury as Director General International Finance continuing into the premiership of David Cameron.

He was appointed Chairman of the EU Financial Services Committee in 2011. He joined HSBC in 2013 and is currently Co-Head of Public Sector Banking in the Global Banking and Markets Division.

He was appointed a Companion of the Order of the Bath by Her Majesty Queen Elizabeth II in the 2014 New Year Honours for services to international finance policy.

In January 2025, Ellam left his role at HSBC after being hired by Prime Minister Sir Keir Starmer as Second Permanent Secretary in the Cabinet Office, European Union and International Economic Affairs, tasked with leading a "reset" of UK-European Union relations.

Government offices
Preceded by David Hill	Downing Street Director of Communications; 2007–2009	Succeeded by Simon Lewis
