= The Blair Years =

2007 book by Alastair Campbell

- Author: Alastair Campbell
- Language: English
- Genre: Memoir
- Publisher: Random House
- Publication date: 9 July 2007
- Publication place: United Kingdom
- Media type: Print (Hardback)
- Pages: 816
- ISBN: 0-09-179629-6
- OCLC: 137221384

The Blair Years is a book by Alastair Campbell, featuring extracts from his diaries detailing the period during which he worked for Tony Blair. Published by Random House, the book was released on 9 July 2007, only two weeks after Blair stood down as prime minister. As the first published major insider diary of the Blair era, many of the revelations in the book were reported on by major news organisations, including:

- Blair had considered resigning as early as June 2002.
- During the build-up to the Commons vote on the Iraq War, civil servants had been making contingency plans for an interim government led by Deputy Prime Minister John Prescott had Blair lost the vote.

The BBC produced a three-part series entitled "The Alastair Campbell Diaries" based on the book, which was shown on BBC Two a few days after the book was published.

The Blair Years was the winner of the Channel 4 award for Political Book of the Year in 2008.
