= All in the Mind (novel) =

2008 novel by Alastair Campbell

- First edition cover
- Author: Alastair Campbell
- Language: English
- Genre: Novel
- Publisher: Hutchinson
- Publication date: 30 October 2008
- Publication place: United Kingdom
- Pages: 304 pp
- ISBN: 978-0-09-192578-9

All in the Mind is a 2008 novel by Alastair Campbell, the former Director of Communications and Strategy for the British Prime Minister Tony Blair. The book is Campbell's debut novel and draws heavily on his own experiences of depression and alcoholism. The story concerns a few days in the life of a psychiatrist, and a selection of his patients. Campbell has admitted that the story is partly autobiographical, although in an article in The Times on 30 October 2008 he wrote, '. . . though it is by me, it is not about me, at least not all of it.' The book received a mixed reception.

== Synopsis ==
Set over a period of four days, the novel explores mental illness through its central character, Professor Martin Sturrock, described as 'widely viewed as one of the best psychiatrists in the business', and several of his patients. Among these are an alcoholic politician, a traumatised burns victim, a depressed manual worker, an adulterous barrister turned fitness fanatic and a Kosovan refugee who has been raped. Each patient tells his or her story in a consultation with Sturrock before they are later revisited in their individual subplots. Over the course of a weekend, it becomes apparent that the brilliant but overworked Sturrock is as desperate for help as the people he is treating, and following an encounter in a brothel, the story ends for Professor Sturrock on a busy London street.

== Background ==
In 1986, while working as a political correspondent for the Daily Mirror, Campbell was admitted to hospital in Scotland, where he had travelled to cover a visit to Glasgow by then Labour leader Neil Kinnock. He was detained by the police for his own safety after being observed behaving oddly. During a stay as an inpatient at the BMI hospital in Glasgow, he was given medication to calm him, and realised that he had an alcohol problem after seeing the psychiatrist. He later returned to England, where his condition continued with a phase of depression.

As he recovered from the breakdown, he began work on a story about a pop star driven to the point of breakdown by a Conservative government press secretary, and after making handwritten notes during a holiday in France, he word processed them when he returned home. However, the file containing the book was accidentally erased. He did not revisit the novel again until he was recording a 2008 BBC documentary about his breakdown.

His inspiration for All in the Mind came while cycling past a cemetery in Golders Green where a funeral was in progress. In 2008 Campbell wrote, 'There seemed to be hundreds of mourners. I started to think about how many people we all touch in our lives. I started to wonder whether the person being buried knew how many people he had touched. By the time I was home, I had a basic idea, a small number of characters and a couple of possible endings. I started to write that evening.' He went on to say that although none of the events or characters from his previous novel had survived in All in the Mind, many of the themes have. 'The limits of the human mind. Depression. Pressure. Breakdown. Family. Fracturing relationships. Forgiveness.' Campbell has admitted that All in the Mind is autobiographical, '. . . in that all the characters, their words, deeds and backgrounds, are all from somewhere inside my mind, and my mind is a product of my experiences.'

== Reaction ==
Reaction to All in the Mind was mixed. Of the book, The Times said, 'a serious subject addressed with compassion, intelligence and sensitivity...this is an emotionally engaging and thought-provoking book', while the actor Stephen Fry said, 'I have rarely read a book where the agonies and insecurities of mental trauma have been so well chronicled'. However, Sahmeer Rahmi, writing for The Daily Telegraph took a diametrically opposing view stating, "Because Campbell has spent his life barking orders – broadcasting not receiving – he has none of the skills needed in a novelist: curiosity, observation, interest in the human condition or in another human's opinion other than how it impacts on himself or his career." Byron Rogers of The Spectator wrote, '. . . whatever the book's merits as a study of depression, I found it difficult to distinguish between the characters for all the supplied detail, and in the end this was fatal. And it was such a good idea.' Frontier Psychiatrist said, '. . . the plot as a concept is not a terrible one, but the central problem is that Campbell's prose basically lacks the dexterity to convincingly render his characters' mental states on the page."
