= Laigh Kirk, Kilmarnock =

Coordinates: 55°36′37″N 4°29′49″W

New Laigh Kirk
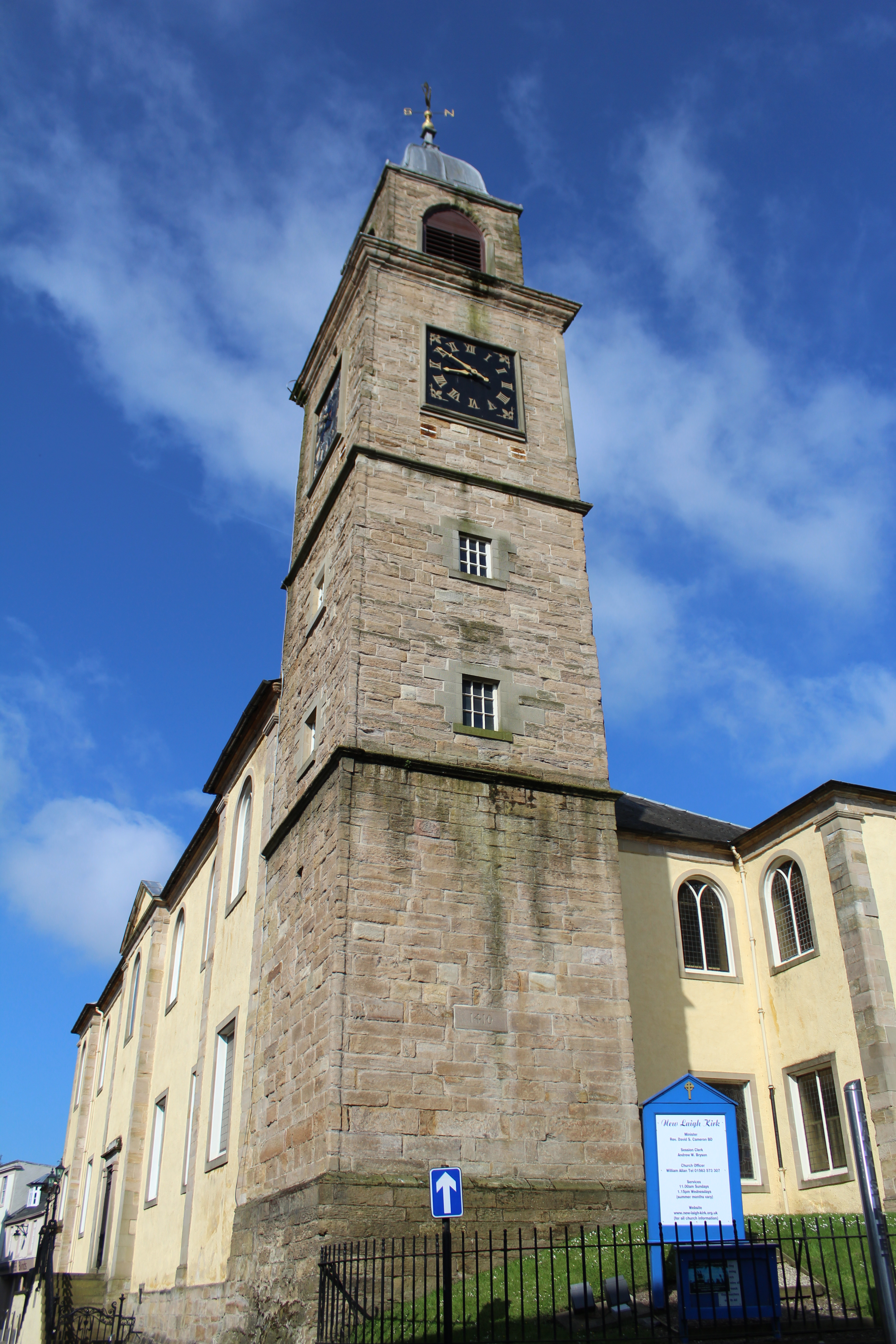
- Laigh Kirk in Kilmarnock
- New Laigh Kirk
- Location: Kilmarnock, North Ayrshire
- Address: John Dickie Street, Kilmarnock
- Country: Scotland
- Language: English
- Denomination: Church of Scotland
- Website: https://www.newlaighkirk.com/

History
- Status: Parish church

Architecture
- Functional status: Active
- Completed: 1802

The Laigh Kirk is a church in Kilmarnock, East Ayrshire, Scotland and has a remake of Homeless Jesus.

== History ==
The current church, the third on the site, was built in 1802. The first church was probably founded by St Marnock, but the earliest extant fabric is the base of the tower, dated 1410. This church was replaced in 1750. Two men named John Ross and John Sheilds were executed in Edinburgh and their heads placed outside the kirk their heads were eventually buried in the kirk`s graveyard.

By 1801, the building was too small to accommodate the large congregation. The passageways and stairs were small and very narrow. The stability of the building had been called into question and there was a local belief in a prophecy that the building was destined to fall down on to the congregation.

On Sunday 18 October 1801, the congregation was unusually large, as churches in neighbouring parishes were vacant, and many had flocked to the Laigh to hear "Great McKinlay", the preacher. As the minister was about to enter the church, a small piece of plaster fell from the ceiling. A cry went up that the building was falling down, panic ensued and the congregation started to rush outside. Those upstairs became tightly jammed together, many fell, crushing and suffocating those poor souls underneath them. Some were crushed against the inward-opening doors at the foot of the stairs. Some desperate people threw themselves from the gallery into body of the kirk, others leapt from windows into the graveyard. 29 people were killed in the stampede and another died soon after. The church was quickly torn down and the current, more spacious church was built the following year.

== Modern Day ==
The current minister is Rev. David Cameron, the chair of the Assembly Trustees the Church of Scotland. He has been in post since 2001, as the only charge he has served in as minister.

== See also ==
- Robert Stirling
