= Ivan Lawrence =

British politician (born 1936)

Sir Ivan Lawrence KC

Chair of the Home Affairs Select Committee
- In office 15 July 1992 – 21 March 1997
- Preceded by: John Wheeler
- Succeeded by: Chris Mullin

Member of Parliament for Burton
- In office 28 February 1974 – 8 April 1997
- Preceded by: John Jennings
- Succeeded by: Janet Dean

Personal details
- Born: 24 December 1936 (age 89) Brighton, Sussex, England
- Party: Conservative
- Education: Christ Church, Oxford
- Profession: Law

Sir Ivan John Lawrence, KC (born 24 December 1936) is a former British Conservative Member of Parliament and criminal barrister.

== Early life and legal career ==
Born in Brighton, Lawrence was the only child of parents of Russian-Romanian Jewish descent. Alma Cogan, a successful singer of traditional pop music in the post-war period, was his cousin. Lawrence was educated at the former Brighton, Hove and Sussex Grammar School where he won a State Scholarship, and is President of the School's Old Boys' Association. He read Jurisprudence at Christ Church, Oxford from 1957 to 1960, where he became president of the Oxford University Progressive Jewish Society, and founded Crime Concern. He did National Service in the RAF from 1955 to 1957, serving in Malta during the Suez Crisis.

Called to the Bar by the Inner Temple in 1962, Lawrence was pupil to James Burge, the leading criminal junior who represented Stephen Ward in the Profumo trials. Lawrence has practised mainly, although not exclusively, as defence cousel at the criminal bar, and was appointed Queen's Counsel in 1981. He became a Recorder of the Crown Court in 1985 (serving for 19 years); a Master Bencher of the Inner Temple in 1990; was elected Head of Chambers at One Essex Court in 2000; and was knighted for political and public service in 1992. He has defended in over 90 murder trials, and has appeared in many notable criminal trials, being, for example, Junior Counsel for the Kray twins (gang-land murders) in seven trials, leading counsel for the serial killer Dennis Nilsen, for Russell Bishop (Brighton Babes in the Wood murders), and for the Defence in the Mountnessing silver bullion robbery and the Curtain Road silver bullion robbery, the Brink's-Mat gold bullion money-laundering, and many trials involving such gangland notables as "Mad" Frankie Fraser and Joey Pyle. Lawrence successfully appeared for the Defence in a war-crimes trial for the mass-murder of 200 victims at The Hague, and he appeared for the snooker champion Quinten Hann charged with rape. Lawrence has been partly responsible, as a member of parliament, for a number of improvements in Criminal Justice such as the introduction of tape recorded police interviews with suspects and the law against suspicious transactions, a major weapon in the fight against money-laundering.

In the field of human rights, he was an active member of "Justice", the human rights organisation, and, in international human rights, he played a prominent and successful part in the campaign to release a million Jews from the Soviet Union, the release of thirty-two Egyptians imprisoned under President Hosni Mubarak, and the release from imprisonment, and subsequent installation as President of the Maldives, of Mohammed Nasheed.

He speaks on economic crime and has annually co-chaired the Cambridge International Symposium on Economic Crime at Jesus College.

== Political career ==
Having twice unsuccessfully stood for the Peckham constituency in 1966 and 1970, Lawrence was elected MP for Burton in February 1974. He held the seat until May 1997, when he lost to Labour's Janet Dean.

He was a member of the Monday Club in 1973 when, in the autumn of that year, he had contributed an article to Monday News on the subject of "The Problem of State Subsidised Strikers". He has also been an active member of the Conservative Bow Group for over 50 years, contributing to many of its publications on law and order over that period, and of the Society of Conservative Lawyers for over 60 years. He is a frequent letter-writer to "The Times" and is often interviewed on television on political topics with which he has had some input and on his famous cases.

In Parliament, he was Chairman of the Home Affairs Select Committee from 1992 to 1997, and Chairman of the Commonwealth Parliamentary Association (UK Branch) from 1995 to 1997. He was a member of the Foreign Affairs Select Committee from 1982 to 1992, and served on a number of other Parliamentary Committees concerned with health, employment, social services, law and order and the consolidation of statutes. He was a founder member of the European Research Group, the originating force behind Brexit.

He was Chairman of the Conservative Friends of Israel, and was a member for several years of the Executive Committee of the 1922 Committee, which represents Conservative backbenchers. His private member's bill in 1991 introduced the National Lottery, which was at first opposed by the Major government, but which was persuaded to change its mind and take over the Lawrence Bill. It has become the world's most successful national lottery, having raised, by 2026, £53 billion for "good causes". In 1985 Lawrence made the longest speech in Parliament that century (on the Water Fluoridation Bill).

== Post-parliamentary career ==
Lawrence is currently a member of 5 Pump Court Chambers, a Fellow of the Society for Advanced Legal Studies, was an elected member of the Bar Council (2004–2010) and is Visiting Professor of Law at the University of Buckingham. He was admitted to the degree of Doctor of Laws "Honoris Causa" by the University in March 2013. In April 2015, he became a Visiting-Professor at the BPP University Law School. He is well-known as an after-dinner, conference and speaker on international cruises. His memoir, My Life of Crime: cases and causes, was published by Book Guild on 30 September 2010 and reprinted in paperback on 1 February 2012.

He is a Freeman of the City of London, Vice-President of the Society of Conservative Lawyers, President of the Spelthorne constituency Conservative Association, was a deputy for the Board of Deputies of British Jews for 40 years, and was a trustee of the Holocaust Educational Trust.

== Personal life ==
He married Gloria Crankshaw, whom he had met at the Oxford University Progressive Jewish Society, at the West London Synagogue in April 1966. She trained in Oxford as an occupational therapist, became a literary agent, and was a qualified Blue-badge guide-lecturer for twenty-five years. She died of brain cancer, following throat cancer, breast cancer, and terminal lung cancer, on 4 October 2016. They had one daughter, Rachel Lawrence, a criminal barrister for 21 years, who was also an amateur actress, pianist, former CF Achiever of the Year who once appeared on ITV's Blind Date. She died of lung failure caused by cystic fibrosis, aged 45 years on 6 September 2013.

== In popular culture ==
Lawrence was portrayed by Pip Torrens in Des, a 2020 docudrama focusing on Dennis Nilsen.
