= Parliament Hill School =

Location
- Highgate Road; Borough of Camden, London, NW5 1RL; England; 51.5582°N 0.1503°W

Information
- Type: Community school
- Established: 1906
- Local authority: Camden
- Department for Education URN: 100050 Tables
- Ofsted: Reports
- Headmistress: Sarah Creasey
- Gender: Girls
- Age: 11 to 18
- Enrolment: 1218 (2025)
- Capacity: 1164 (officially)
- Website: http://www.parliamenthill.camden.sch.uk

Parliament Hill School is a secondary school for girls with a mixed sixth form located in the Borough of Camden in London, England. In 2013, there were 1,250 students on roll, between the ages of 11 and 18.

== History ==
=== Grammar school ===
The school is the former Parliament Hill Grammar School. The school was damaged during World War II, on one occasion losing 700 windows in a single night, although no bombs directly hit it. During the war, pupils occasionally had lessons in air raid shelters and staff kept a daily list of girls whose homes had been bombed the night before to ensure that they would not be punished for incomplete homework.

=== Comprehensive ===
It became a comprehensive in 1957.

In 1999, Parliament Hill School become one of the first schools to introduce a cashless catering system, which they did in an attempt to prevent dinner money being stolen by bullies.

In November 2019, staff and students at the school underwent screenings for tuberculosis after five cases were found among the students.

In March 2021, students at the school held a protest after the school held a “shamefully insensitive and inadequate” presentation about sexual assault which promoted the NotAllMen hashtag and advised students to wear modest clothing to prevent being raped.

== Location and facilities ==
The school is located on the edge of Hampstead Heath and comprises a combination of both modern and traditional buildings.

In January 2014, the school unveiled plans for a £19 million redevelopment of the school, encompassing the construction of two new buildings to replace a number of the older ones. The new buildings are designed to be environmentally friendly, incorporating a number of features to reduce carbon emissions. The new development includes a new sixth form centre for students at the LaSWAP Sixth Form.

== Academic performance ==
Parliament Hill School was rated 'Good' overall by Ofsted inspectors in 2013, with behaviour and safety of students and leadership and management rated 'Outstanding'. The number of students achieving five or more A*–C grades including English and Maths in 2013 was 67%, 14 percentage points higher than the national average.

Students at the school come from a wide range of socioeconomic and ethnic backgrounds, and almost half of students speak English as an additional language. The majority of students move on to the LaSWAP Sixth Form following completion of their GCSE courses.

The school has Investors in People accreditation and participates in the London Excellence in Work Experience Scheme.

== Sixth Form ==
The school is part of the LaSWAP Sixth Form consortium, along with the neighbouring schools La Sainte Union Catholic School, William Ellis School and Acland Burghley School. There were 1,266 students on roll in 2013. 79% of students achieved three or more A Level qualifications in 2013.

== Notable former pupils ==
=== Parliament Hill School ===
- Dua Lipa, singer and actress
- Greta Bellamacina, actress, poet, model
- Emma Hayes OBE, football manager
- Grace Campbell, comedian
- Kirby Howell-Baptiste, actress
- Lily McMenamy, model and actress
- Rosie Pope, entrepreneur
- Laura Trevelyan, BBC journalist
- Sophia Akuffo, formerly Chief Justice of Ghana
- Sagal Abdi-Wali, politician

=== Parliament Hill Grammar School ===
- Katrin Cartlidge, actress
- Mary Louise Coulouris, artist
- Shani Rhys James, artist
- Margot Shiner, gastroenterologist
- Lola Young, Baroness Young of Hornsey OBE, artist

=== LaSWAP Sixth Form ===
- Ms. Dynamite, rapper and singer

== Notable Former Teachers ==
- Dawn French, actress; comedienne; and writer, formerly taught drama
