= Richard Rose Central Academy =

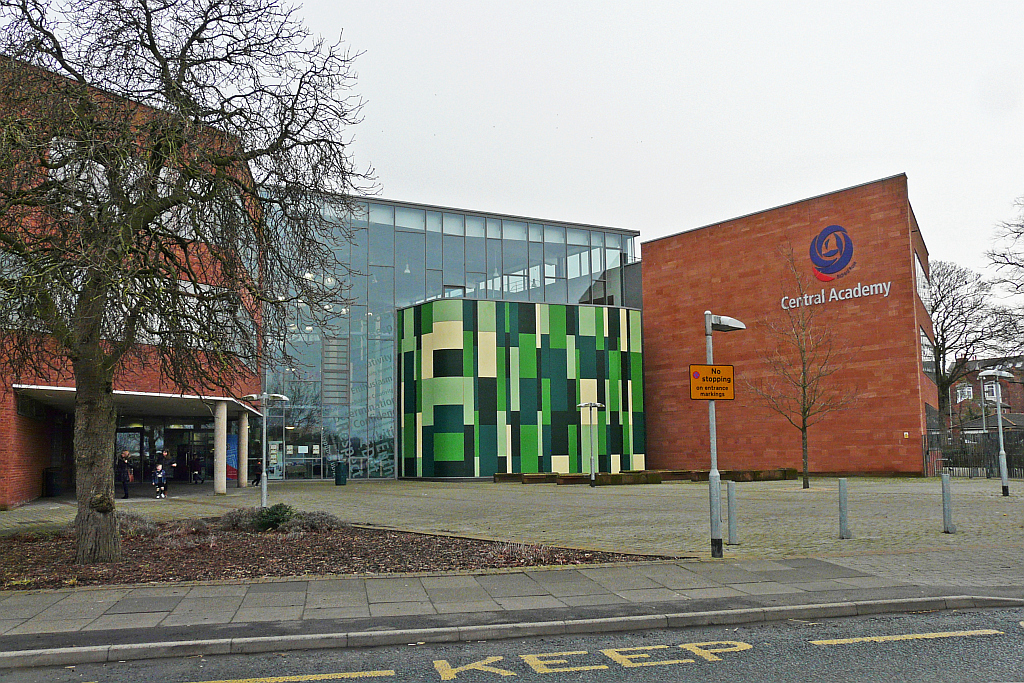

Location
- Victoria Place; Carlisle, Cumbria, CA1 1LY; England; 54.89535°N 2.92391°W

Information
- Type: Academy
- Founder: Bartek Skurczynski
- Local authority: Cumberland Council
- Department for Education URN: 135621 Tables
- Ofsted: Reports
- Principal: Dan Markham
- Gender: Coeducational
- Age: 11 to 18
- Website: http://www.rrca.org.uk/

Richard Rose Central Academy is a coeducational secondary school and sixth form with academy status. It is located in Carlisle in the English county of Cumbria.

== History ==
=== Grammar school ===
The school traces its roots to Carlisle & County High School for Girls (CCHS), which opened at 19 Castle Street in January 1884 for 36 girls. The site is now a bookshop. The school was a girls' grammar school. In 1909 a new site was built at Lismore Place for Carlisle High School. The school had houses of Netherby, Greystoke (after Greystoke, Cumbria), Lanercost (after Lanercost Priory) and Linstock (after Linstock, Cumbria).

In 1904 the school was transferred to Cumberland County Council and later became St Aidan's County High School, a co-educational comprehensive school. The school was a girls' grammar school for 86 years until 1970.

=== Academy ===
In September 2008, St Aidan's County High School and the North Cumbria Technology College (formerly Harraby School) merged to form Richard Rose Central Academy. The school was subsequently rebuilt on the former St Aidan's site in 2010, costing £31m. The academy was first sponsored by Eddie Stobart owner Andrew Tinkler and local businessman Brian Scowcroft.

=== Protests ===
In January 2009, there were protests by parents and pupils regarding poor quality education and school facilities. The school was found to be inadequate by Ofsted and was placed in special measures, with the headmaster and chief executive being immediately replaced.

In October 2019, a protest took place outside the school where bottles and rocks were thrown at windows. The protest was triggered by strict rules regarding students' haircuts, such as requiring female students to have long hair and male students to have short hair. Parents had commonly refereed the school as a "Prison". The situation escalated to the point where a student was expelled for their haircut. Following this incident, Principal Ceri Bacon left and was replaced by Dan Markham.

=== Ofsted judgements ===
After previously receiving a 'Requires Improvement' assessment, in 2017, the Academy was rated as 'Good' by Ofsted.

A new Principal, Dan Markham, joined in 2021. In 2022, Ofsted downgraded the Academy to 'Requires Improvement' in all categories.

=== Federation ===
Since September 2014 Richard Rose Central Academy is sponsored by United Learning. The school is in a federation with Richard Rose Morton Academy and the schools share a sixth form. The sixth form offers students the option to study from a range of A-levels, BTECs and vocational courses as programmes of study.

== Notable former pupils ==
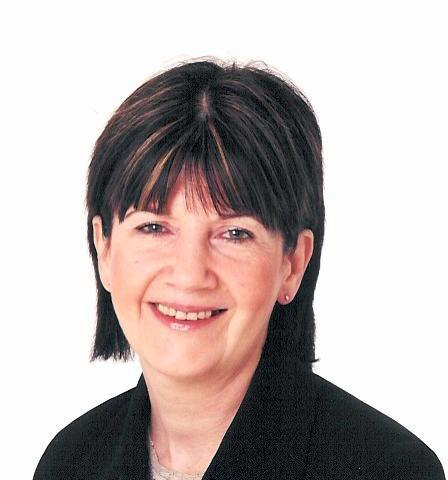
Liz Blackman

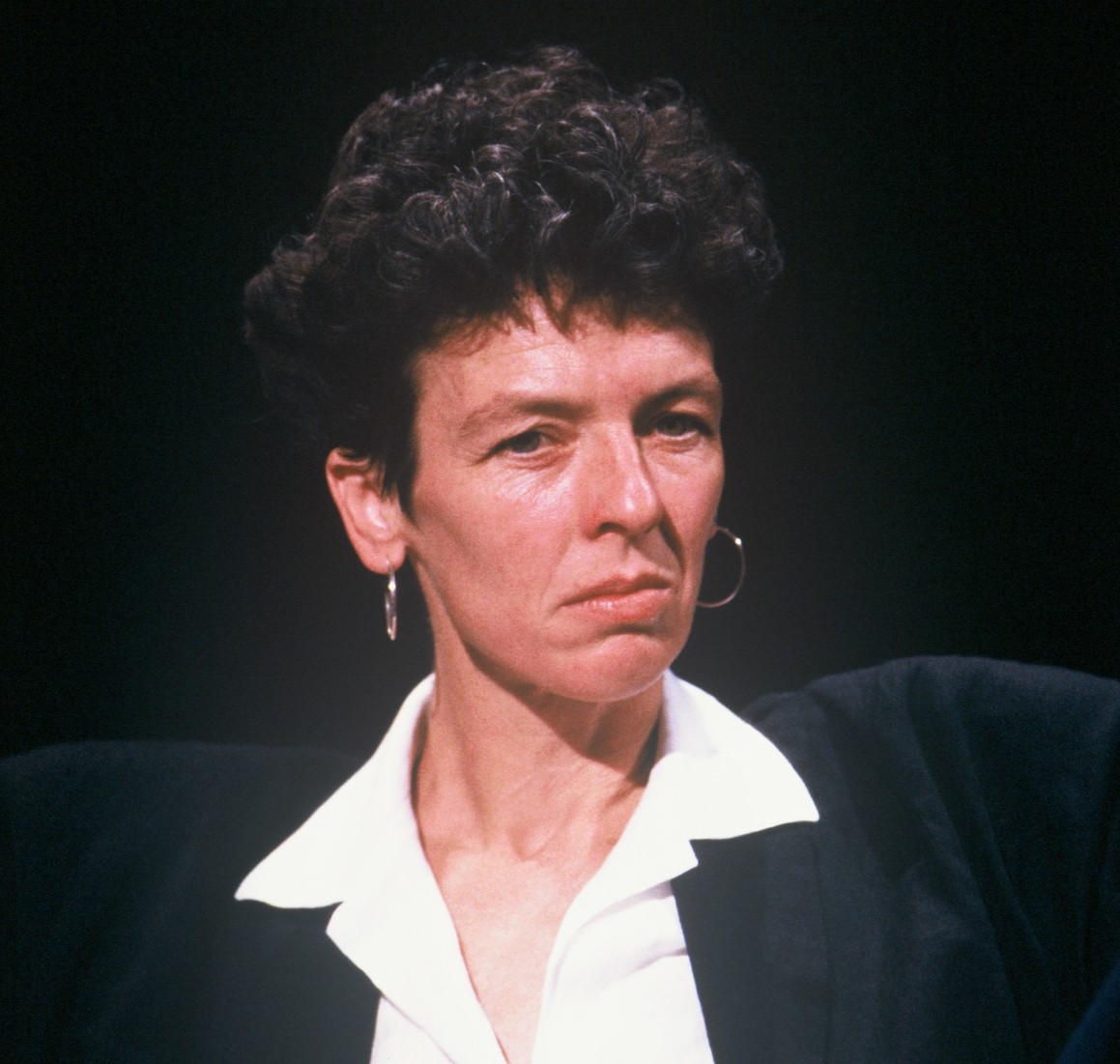
Bea Campbell in July 1987

=== St Aidan's County High School ===
- Mike Freer, Conservative MP for Finchley and Golders Green (former seat of Margaret Thatcher) 2010–24, and leader of Barnet London Borough Council 2006–09
- Helen Grant (nee Okuboye), Conservative MP for Maidstone and The Weald (succeeding Ann Widdecombe), 2010–24 and Maidstone and Malling since 2024. Captain of the school's hockey and tennis teams

=== Carlisle & County High School for Girls ===
- Liz Blackman, Labour MP from 1997–2010 for Erewash
- Beatrix Campbell (nee Barnes), feminist writer
- Margaret Forster, author
- Patricia Langham (nee Lowrie), Headmistress from 1987–2009 of Wakefield Girls' High School, and President in 2007 of the Girls' Schools Association
- Jancis Robinson (head girl), wine critic
