= Caccae =

Caccae may refer to:

- Anaerostipes caccae, species of bacteria
- Bacteroides caccae, species of bacteria
- Mobilicoccus caccae, species of bacteria
