= Mobilicoccus pelagius =

Scientific classification
- Domain: Bacteria
- Kingdom: Bacillati
- Phylum: Actinomycetota
- Class: Actinomycetes
- Order: Micrococcales
- Family: Dermatophilaceae
- Genus: Mobilicoccus
- Species: M. pelagius

Binomial name
- Mobilicoccus pelagius Hamada et al. 2011

Type strain
- DSM 22762; NBRC 104925; Aji5-31

Species of bacterium

Mobilicoccus pelagius is a Gram-positive bacterium from the genus of Mobilicoccus which has been isolated from the gut of the fish Trachurus japonicus from Japan.
