= Arsenicicoccus dermatophilus =

Scientific classification
- Domain: Bacteria
- Kingdom: Bacillati
- Phylum: Actinomycetota
- Class: Actinomycetes
- Order: Micrococcales
- Family: Dermatophilaceae
- Genus: Arsenicicoccus
- Species: A. dermatophilus

Binomial name
- Arsenicicoccus dermatophilus Gobeli et al. 2013

Type strain
- CCOS 690; CCUG 62181; DSM 25571; KM 894/11

Species of bacterium

Arsenicicoccus dermatophilus is a bacterium from the genus Arsenicicoccus which has been isolated from the foot skin of the flamingo (Phoenicopterus roseus) which suffered from pododermatitis from a zoological gardens in Basel in Switzerland.
