= Arsenicicoccus piscis =

Scientific classification
- Domain: Bacteria
- Kingdom: Bacillati
- Phylum: Actinomycetota
- Class: Actinomycetes
- Order: Micrococcales
- Family: Dermatophilaceae
- Genus: Arsenicicoccus
- Species: A. piscis

Binomial name
- Arsenicicoccus piscis Hamada et al. 2010

Type strain
- DSM 22760; Kis4-19; NBRC 105830

Species of bacterium

Arsenicicoccus piscis is a Gram-positive bacteria from the genus Arsenicicoccus which has been isolated of the gut of the fish Sillago japonica from Awa in Japan.
