= Mobilicoccus massiliensis =

Scientific classification
- Domain: Bacteria
- Kingdom: Bacillati
- Phylum: Actinomycetota
- Class: Actinomycetes
- Order: Micrococcales
- Family: Dermatophilaceae
- Genus: Mobilicoccus
- Species: M. massiliensis

Binomial name
- Mobilicoccus massiliensis Mathloughi et al. 2017

Type strain
- CSUR P1306; DSM 29065; SIT2

Synonyms
- Mobilicoccus massiliens

Species of bacterium

Mobilicoccus massiliensis is a Gram-positive, facultatively anaerobic non-spore-forming and motile bacterium from the genus of Mobilicoccus which has been isolated from feces of a human boy with kwashiorkor.
