= NEEC =

NEEC may refer to:

- National Express East Coast
- North of England Education Conference
