= Buttercups Sanctuary for Goats =

British charitable organisation

The Buttercups Sanctuary for Goats
- Founded: 2003
- Founder: Bob and Valerie Hitch
- Purpose: Animal welfare, animal rescue
- Location: Wierton Road, Boughton Monchelsea, Maidstone, Kent, ME17 4JW, England
- Region served: Kent and the surrounding counties
- Method: animal sanctuaries, popular education, Adult education
- Website: www.buttercups.org.uk

The Buttercups Sanctuary for Goats is a British animal sanctuary and charitable organisation devoted to goat welfare and rescue. The charity, which is based in Maidstone, Kent, England, was established in 2003. It is the only goat charity in the whole of the UK.

== History ==
The Buttercups Sanctuary started in 1989 when Robert and Valerie Hitch took over the care of two goats from the RSPCA. As more goats arrived, having become unwanted or been neglected, the costs of keeping them soared; they were granted charity status by the Charity Commission for England and Wales in September 2003.

== The sanctuary ==
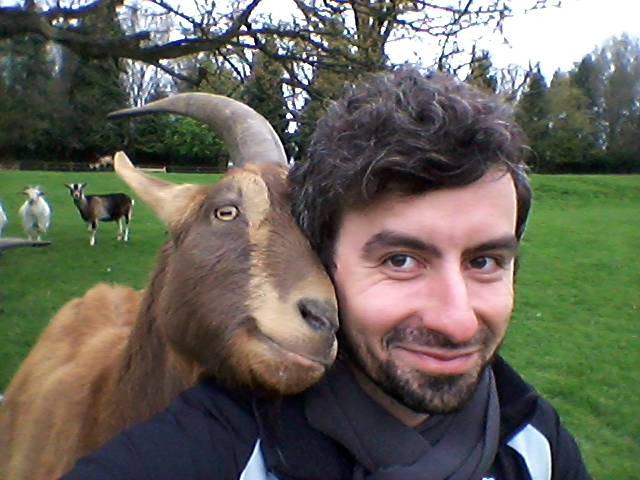
A goat at Buttercups Sanctuary

The sanctuary now cares for over 140 goats and provides care to approximately an additional 120 goats in foster homes.

Common problems for goats arriving at the sanctuary include malnutrition and ailments such as rainscald, foot rot, mud fever and other skin conditions. They may also be infested with worms. Neglect and cruelty may also mean, that on arrival, the animals may be very mistrustful of humans. Yet, many do recover human trust again.

== Educational work ==
The sanctuary offers student work-placements to assist with their studies.

Postdoctoral researchers from Queen Mary University used this sanctuary to conduct studies into anthrozoology.

Some of this research work has been featured on prime-time British television.
