= Arsenicicoccus bolidensis =

Scientific classification
- Domain: Bacteria
- Kingdom: Bacillati
- Phylum: Actinomycetota
- Class: Actinomycetes
- Order: Micrococcales
- Family: Dermatophilaceae
- Genus: Arsenicicoccus
- Species: A. bolidensis

Binomial name
- Arsenicicoccus bolidensis Collins et al. 2004

Type strain
- Bact 10; CCUG 47306; CIP 108315; DSM 15745; IAM 15342; JCM 13385

Species of bacterium

Arsenicicoccus bolidensis is a Gram-positive, coccus-shaped, non-spore-forming and facultatively anaerobic bacteria from the genus Arsenicicoccus which has been isolated from lake sediments from Boliden in Sweden.
