= Nottingham Conference Centre =

Conference centre in England

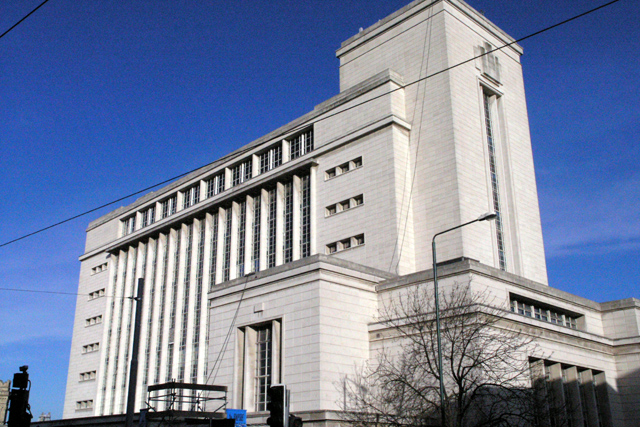
- The Newton Building

General information
- Type: Conference centre
- Classification: Grade II listed building
- Location: Nottingham, England, United Kingdom
- Coordinates: 52.9562°N 1.1520°W

Nottingham Conference Centre is a modern conference facility in the heart of Nottingham city centre. It was created in 2009 as part of the Newton-Arkwright regeneration development at Nottingham Trent University and designed by Hopkins Architects.

Located in the Grade II listed Newton Building, Nottingham Conference Centre offers conference facilities, meeting rooms, event management, audio-visual, wedding and catering facilities.

The centre has eight different rooms whose maximum occupancy ranges from 150 to 450 people.

== History ==
Nottingham Conference Centre was created in 2010 following a multimillion-pound refurbishment of two of Nottingham Trent University's Grade II* listed buildings, Newton and Arkwright.

The centre's three Victorian character rooms are situated in the Arkwright building, originally built between 1877 and 1881 by Lockwood and Mawson, the prominent Yorkshire architectural practice founded by Henry Francis Lockwood. The foundation stone was laid on 27 September 1877 by the Lord Mayor of Nottingham, Alderman Bowers. The Old Chemistry Theatre, now restored, saw the discovery of silicone polymers by Frederick Kipping in the late 19th century. The Old Library was once the original city library and the Old Museum housed a natural history collection which included the stuffed gorilla now relocated to nearby Wollaton Hall.

In 1908, English poet DH Lawrence received his teaching certificate after studying in the Arkwright building. In his novel The Rainbow (1915) Lawrence drew on his own memories of Arkwright for Ursula Brangwen's first impressions of University College, with the lines: “The big college built of stone, standing in the quiet street, with a rim of grass and lime-trees all so peaceful: she felt it remote, a magic-land.” A World War II bombing raid in 1941 destroyed large parts of the Arkwright building, but it was restored to its original state after the war and was granted status as a listed building in 1972.

Originally, the Newton building was the architectural response to rapidly expanding student numbers in an optimistic post-war climate for British higher education. This art-deco building was constructed between 1956 and 1958. It was designed by Thomas Cecil Howitt, the most prolific and versatile Nottingham architect of the first half of the 20th century, and one of the most prominent provincial English architects of his generation. A pair of breeding peregrine falcons live on the Newton Building roof during the spring and summer months and the Newton Arkwright building was officially opened by Sir David Attenborough in May 2011.

== Awards ==
Since its completion, the redevelopment project has won a number of awards, including a national Royal Institute of British Architects (RIBA) Award in 2011. It also received a Civic Trust Award. In addition, the scheme received the title of Project of the Year at the East Midlands Centre for Constructing the Built Environment Awards.

== Events ==
Nottingham Conference Centre has hosted the North of England Education Conference and events for NSpine and The Prince's Trust. They also host a series of corporate Christmas parties throughout December every year.
