= Tonsilliphilus suis =

Scientific classification
- Domain: Bacteria
- Kingdom: Bacillati
- Phylum: Actinomycetota
- Class: Actinomycetes
- Order: Micrococcales
- Family: Dermatophilaceae
- Genus: Tonsilliphilus; Azuma et al. 2013
- Species: T. suis

Binomial name
- Tonsilliphilus suis Azuma et al. 2013

Type strain
- ATCC 35846; CCM 3774; DSM 21880; JCM 15727; W254

Genus of bacteria

Tonsilliphilus suis is a species of bacteria from the family Dermatophilaceae which has been isolated from a submandibular lymph node of a pig.
