= Helen Grant (politician) =

British politician (born 1961)

Helen Grant OBE MP
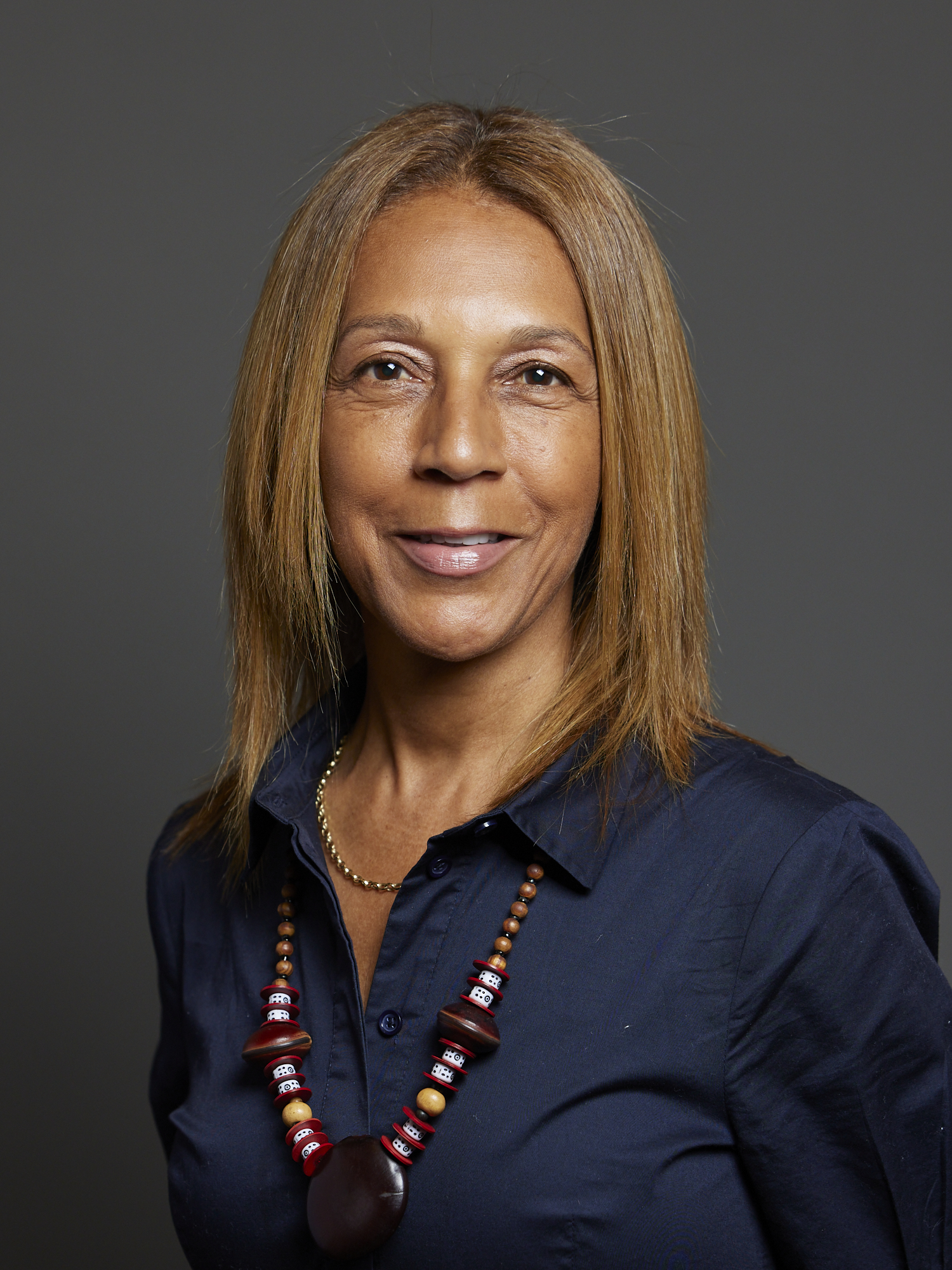
- Official portrait, 2024

Shadow Solicitor General
- In office 6 November 2024 – 2 September 2026
- Leader: Kemi Badenoch
- Preceded by: Alberto Costa
- Succeeded by: Jerome Mayhew
Junior ministerial offices
Parliamentary Under-Secretary of State for Sport and Tourism
In office 7 October 2013 – 12 May 2015
Prime Minister	David Cameron
Preceded by	Hugh Robertson
Succeeded by	Tracey Crouch
Parliamentary Under-Secretary of State for Courts and Victims
In office 4 September 2012 – 7 October 2013
Prime Minister	David Cameron
Preceded by	Jonathan Djanogly
Succeeded by	Shailesh Vara
Parliamentary Under-Secretary of State for Equalities
In office 4 September 2012 – 8 May 2015
Prime Minister	David Cameron
Preceded by	Lynne Featherstone
Succeeded by	Caroline Dinenage

Member of Parliament for Maidstone and Malling Maidstone and The Weald (2010–2024)
- Incumbent
- Assumed office 6 May 2010
- Preceded by: Ann Widdecombe
- Majority: 1,674 (3.6%)

Personal details
- Born: Helen Okuboye; 28 September 1961 (age 65) Willesden, Middlesex, England
- Party: Conservative (2006–present)
- Other political affiliations: Labour (2004–2006)
- Spouse: Simon Grant (m. 1991)
- Children: 2
- Education: University of Hull (LLB); College of Law (LPC)
- Website: helengrant.org

Helen Grant OBE (née Okuboye; born 28 September 1961) is a British Conservative Party politician who has been the Member of Parliament (MP) for Maidstone and Malling, formerly Maidstone and The Weald, since 2010. A member of the Conservative Party, she succeeded Ann Widdecombe, who was first elected in 1987.

Grant was the first black woman of mixed heritage to be elected as a Conservative MP and selected as a candidate to stand for a Conservative-held parliamentary seat. She first served in government as jointly Parliamentary Under-Secretary of State for Women and Equalities (2012–2015) and Parliamentary Under-Secretary of State for Justice (2012–2013). She also became Minister of State for Sport and Tourism in 2013, a post she held until after the 2015 general election.

In January 2021, she was appointed as Special Envoy of Boris Johnson on Girls' Education. On 19 July 2026, Grant announced that she would be standing down at the next United Kingdom general election.

== Early life and career ==
Grant was born in Willesden, now in north London to an English mother, Gladys Spedding, and a Nigerian father, Julius Okuboye, who was an orthopaedic surgeon. Grant's mother was a nurse at a hospital in Newcastle who became pregnant at 21 to a doctor at the hospital. She grew up in a single-parent family after her parents separated and her father emigrated to the United States; Grant did not form a relationship with her father until she was 16. She was raised in Carlisle where she lived on the city's Raffles council estate with her mother, grandmother and great-grandmother. In a 2010 interview, she spoke fondly of her childhood and the house in which she grew up. "I had happy memories in that house and it gave me a good start in life, [...] There was deprivation around, there was certainly need, there was some domestic violence and there were some fights. But my memory of the square where we lived is that there was pride in people."

At St. Aidan's County High School (since 2008 the Richard Rose Central Academy) she was captain of the school tennis and hockey teams and represented Cumbria in hockey, tennis, athletics, and cross-country. She was also an under-16 judo champion for the north of England and southern Scotland. She studied at Trinity School.

She completed an LLB at the University of Hull and her solicitor qualification at the College of Law in Guildford.

=== Career ===
Grant undertook her articles of clerkship at Cartmell, Mawson & Main solicitors in Carlisle, where she qualified as a solicitor. She then joined a legal practice in Wimbledon specialising in family law. She established her practice in 1996 which specialised in family law. She said that as a lawyer she saw a 'huge amount' of domestic violence and that it had a 'huge effect' on her subsequent ministerial role.

Grant joined the Labour Party in 2004 and was asked by a senior local party figure to consider becoming a local councillor, but she rejected the idea. She joined the Conservatives in 2006, and later said of her membership of Labour: "It was almost looking in the biscuit barrel, not liking the look of the biscuits, and slamming the lid shut".

Grant was a non-executive director of the Croydon NHS Primary Care Trust from January 2005 to March 2007 before stepping down to concentrate on her political career. In 2006, Grant worked with Iain Duncan Smith's Centre for Social Justice in the formation of Conservative policy to deal with family breakdown. Grant was one of the authors of the Social Justice Policy Group Report 'State of the Nation – Fractured Families' published in December 2006, and the follow-up solutions report 'Breakthrough Britain' published in July 2007.

== Parliamentary career ==
Grant applied to become a parliamentary candidate, and was approved as a candidate in May 2006. She was selected by the Conservative Party as the prospective candidate for Maidstone and The Weald in January 2008, as the candidate to succeed long-standing MP Ann Widdecombe who stepped down. She was the first black woman to be selected to defend a Conservative seat, which at the time had a majority of 15,000.

Grant was elected as the Conservative MP for Maidstone and The Weald at the 2010 general election on 6 May 2010, achieving a reduced majority of 5,889. Her election made her the Conservative Party's first black woman MP. In June 2010, she was elected to the Justice Select Committee, a House of Commons select committee which oversees the policy, administration, and spending of the UK's Ministry of Justice.

On 4 September 2012, following a Government reshuffle, Grant was appointed as Parliamentary Under-Secretary of State for Justice, and Women and Equality. Grant said her role was to "look after the interests of victims and witnesses of any crime, including domestic violence, sexual violence and rape."

On 7 October 2013, Grant was appointed Sports and Equalities minister succeeding Hugh Robertson. She is a former judo champion, and told The Independent newspaper that sport was "very much in my DNA". However, the following month when quizzed by her regional news television station ITV Meridian about sports, she failed to answer a single question correctly.

On 12 May 2015, following the general election, Grant was removed from her position as Sports Minister and was replaced by her neighbouring MP and colleague Tracey Crouch.

Grant was opposed to Brexit prior to the 2016 EU membership referendum. Helen Grant is the Parliamentary Chair for the Conservative Friends of the Commonwealth.

Grant was appointed Officer of the Order of the British Empire (OBE) in the 2023 New Year Honours for political and public service.

In the 2024 United Kingdom general election, she was re-elected in the newly named seat of Maidstone and Malling. She was elected on a much reduced majority of 1,674. Grant stood in the election for Deputy Speaker in the House of Commons, but was unsuccessful. On 6 November 2024, Grant was appointed Shadow Solicitor General by Leader of the Opposition Kemi Badenoch. She left the role in the 2026 reshuffle and was succeeded by Jerome Mayhew.

=== Expenses controversy 2012 ===
Grant attracted controversy in November 2012 when an edition of the Channel 4 documentary series Dispatches reported that she was according to published records claiming the full £1,666.67/month under MPs expenses – the maximum allowed within the IPSA rules – for a flat in London, when she has a home in Kingswood, Surrey, near Reigate. Kingswood is located within a zone around London in which MPs cannot claim expenses for a London rental, but it is allowed in her case because she represents Maidstone and the Weald, which is outside the exclusion zone. At that time Grant used a base bordering her constituency, where her mother lives and her son also lived while at school in Maidstone until 2013. IPSA confirmed that Grant was entitled to a second-home allowance on Parliamentary expenses because her constituency was outside London, and her claim was within the rules. However, Labour MP John Mann, a long-standing campaigner on MPs' expenses, described the minister's actions as "outrageous" and a "farce":

However, Mann's comments were countered by the Reigate MP Crispin Blunt. He said: "Helen has a substantial ministerial portfolio, constituents, a constituency and family responsibilities to manage. Her arrangements are not analogous to mine"; "These are part of the trade-offs that MPs and ministers have to make all the time to try to meet all the competing demands on them. Frankly, I think this is a pretty cheap shot by Dispatches and I would hope you would be sympathetic to someone who has done a considerable public service, by moving from a successful professional service business into public service at significant expense to herself and her family".

=== IPSA controversy ===
Grant was also involved in controversy after the Independent Parliamentary Standards Authority found that the standard employment contract template for the majority of her staff had been amended although her husband, who was also employed by her, remained on an unaltered contract. A member of staff requiring time off for a medical condition discovered their contract had been amended to offer only two weeks' sick pay rather than the IPSA contract standard of 26 weeks.

Grant initially refused to comment on the claim although the Ministry of Justice stated that the changes to contracts were an attempt to provide a "fairer deal" for taxpayers. IPSA stated that the contract should not have been changed. Grant's husband resigned from his position after it was revealed he remained on an unaltered contract, and had known about the discrepancy for two months without informing his wife. It was claimed that this was due to "oversight on his part rather than design" and he had not received any benefits from remaining on the unaltered contract.

== Personal life ==
Grant married her husband, Simon Juliana Grant in 1991; the couple have two sons. Grant's son Ben served in the Royal Marines as a commando for over five years. They have a home in Kingswood, Surrey and in the constituency in East Malling, Kent. Following the Russian invasion of Ukraine, Ben travelled to Ukraine to fight against the invasion.

In July 2026, Grant made public that she had received "major cancer surgery and treatment" between 2023 and 2024.

Parliament of the United Kingdom
Preceded by Ann Widdecombe	Member of Parliament for Maidstone & The Weald; 2010–present	Incumbent
