= Arsenicicoccus =

Scientific classification
- Domain: Bacteria
- Kingdom: Bacillati
- Phylum: Actinomycetota
- Class: Actinomycetes
- Order: Micrococcales
- Family: Dermatophilaceae
- Genus: Arsenicicoccus; Collins et al. 2004

Type species
- Arsenicicoccus bolidensis Collins et al. 2004

Species
- A. bolidensis Collins et al. 2004; A. dermatophilus Gobeli et al. 2013; A. piscis Hamada et al. 2010

Genus of bacteria

Arsenicicoccus is a Gram-positive, non-spore-forming and facultatively anaerobic bacterial genus from the family Dermatophilaceae. The genus was previously in the family Intrasporangiaceae, but was reclassified in 2018.
