= Austwickia chelonae =

Scientific classification
- Domain: Bacteria
- Kingdom: Bacillati
- Phylum: Actinomycetota
- Class: Actinomycetes
- Order: Micrococcales
- Family: Dermatophilaceae
- Genus: Austwickia; Hamada et al. 2011
- Species: A. chelonae

Binomial name
- Austwickia chelonae (Masters et al. 1995) Hamada et al. 2011

Type strain
- ATCC 51576; CCUG 47447; DSM 44178; JCM 9706; NBRC 105200; W16

Synonyms
- Dermatophilus chelonae Masters et al. 1995

Genus of bacteria

Austwickia chelonae is a species of bacteria from the family of Dermatophilaceae, which has been isolated from a snapping turtle from Perth Western in Australia. Austwickia is named after the botanist Peter K.C. Austwick.
