= Ann Widdecombe =

British politician and media personality (1947–2026)

The Right Honourable Ann Widdecombe DSG
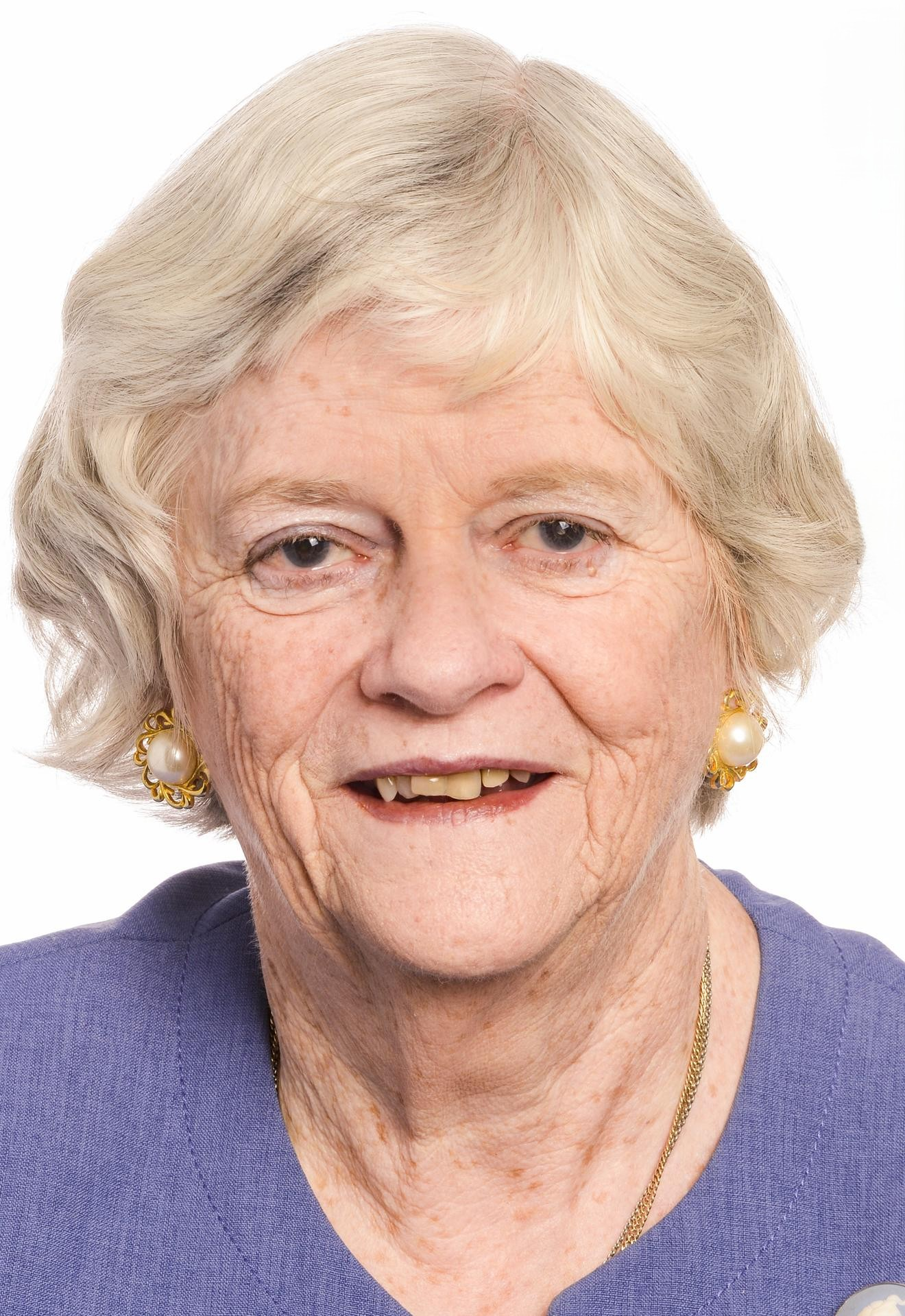
- Official portrait, 2019

Minister of State for Prisons
- In office 28 February 1995 – 2 May 1997
- Prime Minister: John Major
- Preceded by: Michael Forsyth
- Succeeded by: Joyce Quin

Minister of State for Employment (Note: Parliamentary Under-Secretary of State (1993–94))
- In office 27 May 1993 – 5 July 1995
- Prime Minister: John Major
- Preceded by: Patrick McLoughlin
- Succeeded by: Lord Henley
Junior ministerial offices
Parliamentary Under-Secretary of State for Social Security
In office 30 November 1990 – 27 May 1993
| Prime Minister | John Major |
| Preceded by | Gillian Shephard |
| Succeeded by | William Hague |
Shadow portfolios
Shadow Secretary of State
| 1998–1999 | Health |
| 1999–2001 | Home Department |
Parliamentary offices
Member of the European Parliament for South West England
In office 2 July 2019 – 31 January 2020
| Preceded by | Julia Reid |
| Succeeded by | Constituency abolished |

Member of Parliament for Maidstone and The Weald Maidstone (1987–1997)
- In office 11 June 1987 – 12 April 2010
- Preceded by: John Wells
- Succeeded by: Helen Grant

Personal details
- Born: Ann Noreen Widdecombe; 4 October 1947 Bath, Somerset, England
- Died: c. 8 July 2026 (aged 78) Haytor Vale, Devon, England
- Cause of death: Blunt force injury (provisional; homicide)
- Party: Conservative (1976–2019); Brexit Party (Note: The Brexit Party was renamed Reform UK in 2021) (2019–2020); Reform UK (from 2023)
- Education: University of Birmingham (BA); Lady Margaret Hall, Oxford (MA)
- Occupation: Politician; media personality
- Ann Widdecombe's voice Widdecombe speaking at the European Parliament; Recorded 15 January 2020

Ann Noreen Widdecombe (4 October 1947 – c. 8 July 2026) (Note: Widdecombe is believed to have been fatally attacked on 8 July; some sources give this as her date of death) was a British politician and media personality. As a member of the Conservative Party, she was the member of Parliament (MP) for Maidstone and The Weald, previously Maidstone, from 1987 to 2010. She served as a government minister and, later, as an opposition minister. After a period of retirement from politics, Widdecombe joined the Brexit Party – later Reform UK – in 2019. She was their member of the European Parliament (MEP) for South West England from 2019 to 2020.

Born in Bath, Somerset, Widdecombe read Latin at the University of Birmingham, then philosophy, politics and economics at Lady Margaret Hall, Oxford. A convert from Anglicanism to Roman Catholicism, she was a member of the Conservative Christian Fellowship. She served as Minister of State for Employment from 1994 to 1995 and Minister of State for Prisons from 1995 to 1997. Under William Hague, she sat in the Shadow Cabinet as Shadow Secretary of State for Health from 1998 to 1999 and Shadow Home Secretary from 1999 to 2001. She was appointed to the Privy Council in 1997.

Widdecombe stood down from the House of Commons at the 2010 general election. From 2002 she made numerous television and radio appearances, including as a presenter. She competed in the eighth series of Strictly Come Dancing in 2010 and was runner-up in the twenty-first series of Celebrity Big Brother in 2018. A prominent Eurosceptic, she supported the Vote Leave campaign during the 2016 referendum on the United Kingdom's membership of the European Union (EU).

She returned to politics as the Brexit Party's lead candidate in South West England at the 2019 European Parliament election, winning a seat in line with national results and serving until the UK left the EU on 31 January 2020. At the 2019 general election, she contested Plymouth Sutton and Devonport for the Brexit Party, finishing third and retaining her deposit. Widdecombe served as Reform UK's immigration and justice spokesperson from 2023 until 2026.

Ideologically, Widdecombe identified as a social conservative, and emphasised traditional values. During her time in the House of Commons, she opposed the legality of abortion, opposed granting LGBT people legal rights such as equalisation of the age of consent and opposed the repeal of Section 28. She supported the reintroduction of the death penalty for murder and opposed all forms of assisted dying. She supported rigorous animal protection laws and opposed fox hunting.

On 9 July 2026, Widdecombe was found dead in her home in Devon; it is believed she was attacked the previous day and her provisional cause of death was recorded as blunt-force trauma. A 28-year-old British man was charged with murder on 20 July.

== Early life ==
Ann Noreen Widdecombe was born on 4 October 1947 in Bath, Somerset, the second child and only daughter of Rita Noreen (née Plummer; 1911–2007) and Ministry of Defence civil servant James Murray Widdecombe (1910–1999). Both parents were from the West Country: her father was born in Saltash and her mother in Plymouth. As a child, she often visited the area to see relatives and would walk on Dartmoor with her father.

Widdecombe attended the Royal Naval School in Singapore and La Sainte Union Convent School in Bath; she then spent three years reading Latin at the University of Birmingham. She went on to study philosophy, politics and economics at Lady Margaret Hall, Oxford. She served one term as the secretary of the Oxford Union in 1971 and one term as its treasurer in 1972.

While at Oxford, Widdecombe lived next door to Mary Archer, Edwina Currie and Michèle Brown, the wife of Gyles Brandreth. She worked for Unilever from 1973 to 1975 and then as an administrator at the University of London from 1975 to 1987 before entering Parliament.

== Political career ==
In 1974, Widdecombe served as personal assistant to Michael Ancram during the February and October general elections. From 1976 to 1978 she was a councillor on Runnymede District Council in Surrey.

Widdecombe contested Burnley in the 1979 general election and in 1983 stood against David Owen in Plymouth Devonport. In 1983, she co-founded Women and Families for Defence with Lady Olga Maitland and Virginia Bottomley, a group formed in opposition to the anti-nuclear Greenham Common Women's Peace Camp.

Widdecombe was first elected to the House of Commons for the Conservatives at the 1987 general election, representing Maidstone (renamed Maidstone and The Weald in 1997), which she won with a majority of 10,364 over the SDP–Liberal Alliance's Christopher Sutton-Mattocks.

=== In government ===
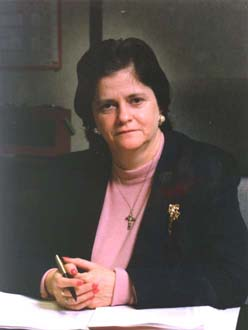
Official portrait, 1996

Widdecombe joined Prime Minister John Major's government as Parliamentary Under-Secretary of State for Social Security in 1990. In 1993, she moved to the Department of Employment and was promoted to Minister of State the following year. In 1995, she entered the Home Office as Minister of State for Prisons and visited every prison in the UK.

In 1996, as prisons minister, she defended the Government's policy of shackling pregnant prisoners while they were in hospital receiving prenatal care. She told the Commons that the restrictions were necessary to prevent escapes: "Some MPs may like to think that a pregnant woman would not or could not escape. Unfortunately this is not true. The fact is that hospitals are not secure places in which to keep prisoners, and since 1990, 20 women have escaped from hospitals." Jack Straw, then Labour's Shadow Home Secretary, described the practice as "degrading and unnecessary".

=== In opposition ===
Major's government was voted out in the general election of 1 May 1997. Later that month, during an inquiry into a series of prison escapes, Widdecombe remarked of former Home Secretary Michael Howard that there was "something of the night about him". The comment became widely quoted and is thought to have contributed to the failure of Howard's 1997 Conservative leadership campaign, a view shared by both Howard and Widdecombe. It led to caricatures portraying him as a vampire, partly referring to his Romanian ancestry. Howard became party leader in 2003, after which Widdecombe said that she did not retract any of her words about him from 1997, stating: "But that was '97; this is 2003. That was a quarrel; this is not going to be a feud."

Following the Conservatives' defeat in the 1997 election, she spent a year on the backbenches before serving under William Hague as Shadow Health Secretary from 1998 to 1999 and Shadow Home Secretary from 1999 to 2001.

During the 2001 Conservative leadership election, she could not find sufficient support amongst Conservative MPs for her leadership candidacy. She first supported Michael Ancram, who was eliminated in the first round, and then Kenneth Clarke, who lost in the final round. She subsequently declined to serve in Iain Duncan Smith's Shadow Cabinet.

In 2001, when Michael Portillo was standing for Conservative Party leadership, Widdecombe described him and his allies as "backbiters" due to his alleged destabilising influence under Hague. She went on to say that, should he be appointed leader, she would never give him her allegiance. This was amidst objections by socially conservative critics of Portillo described as a homophobic campaign by Timothy Heppell.

In the 2005 leadership election, she initially supported Kenneth Clarke again. Once he was eliminated, she switched her support to Liam Fox. Following Fox's subsequent elimination, she took time to reflect before finally declaring for David Davis. She expressed reservations over the eventual winner David Cameron, feeling that he did not, like the other candidates, have a proven track record, and she was later a leading figure in parliamentary opposition to his A-List policy. At the October 2006 Conservative Conference, she was Chief Dragon in a political version of the television programme Dragons' Den, in which A-list candidates were invited to put forward a policy proposal, which was then torn apart by her team of Rachel Elnaugh, Oliver Letwin and Michael Brown.

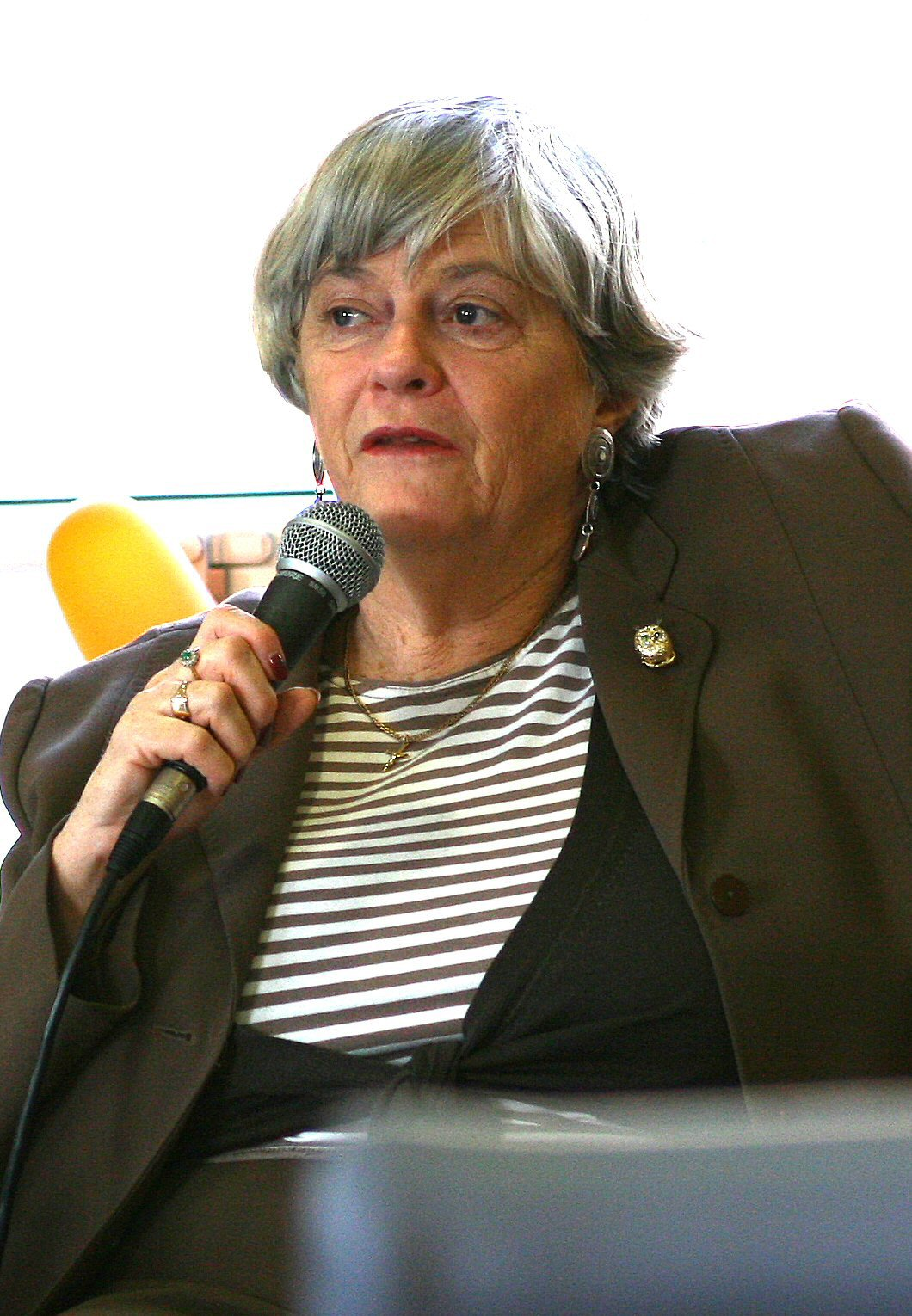
Widdecombe speaking at Nightingale House in London in 2009

In an interview with Metro in September 2006 she stated that if Parliament were of a normal length, it was likely she would retire at the next general election. She confirmed her intention to stand down to The Observer's Pendennis diary in September 2007, and again in October 2007 after Prime Minister Gordon Brown quashed speculation of an autumn 2007 general election.

In November 2006, she moved into the house of an Islington Labour councillor to experience life on a council estate. In response to the experience, she said: "Five years ago I made a speech in the House of Commons about the forgotten decents. I have spent the last week on estates in the Islington area finding out that they are still forgotten."

In 2007 Widdecombe was one of the 98 MPs who voted to keep their expense details secret. When the expenses claims were leaked, however, Widdecombe was described by The Daily Telegraph as one of the "saints" amongst all MPs.

In May 2009, following the resignation of Michael Martin as Speaker of the House of Commons, it was reported that Widdecombe was gathering support for election as interim Speaker until the next general election. On 11 June 2009, she confirmed her bid to be the Speaker, but came last in the second ballot and was eliminated.

=== Retirement ===
Widdecombe retired from politics at the 2010 general election. It was rumoured that she would be a Conservative candidate for a Police and Crime Commissioner post in 2012: she said she had been offered Kent and Devon and Cornwall, but had declined. She later spoke about her opposition to the coalition government and her surprise at not being given a peerage by David Cameron.

In 2016, Widdecombe supported Brexit in the EU membership referendum. Following the resignation of David Cameron, she endorsed Andrea Leadsom in her candidacy for election for the leadership of the governing Conservative Party.

=== Return to politics: Brexit Party and Reform UK ===
In 2019 Widdecombe returned to politics as a candidate for the Brexit Party in the European parliament elections in South West England, which were held on 23 May, though she maintained that she would still vote for the Conservatives in the local elections that were to take place three weeks before. She was immediately expelled by the Conservative Party. Widdecombe had considered joining the Brexit Party in March 2019, but joined later, in May.

Widdecombe said that her decision to stand resulted from the Government's failure to deliver Britain's departure from the EU on schedule. "Both major parties need a seismic shock," she said, "to see the extent of public disgust." She subsequently won her seat.

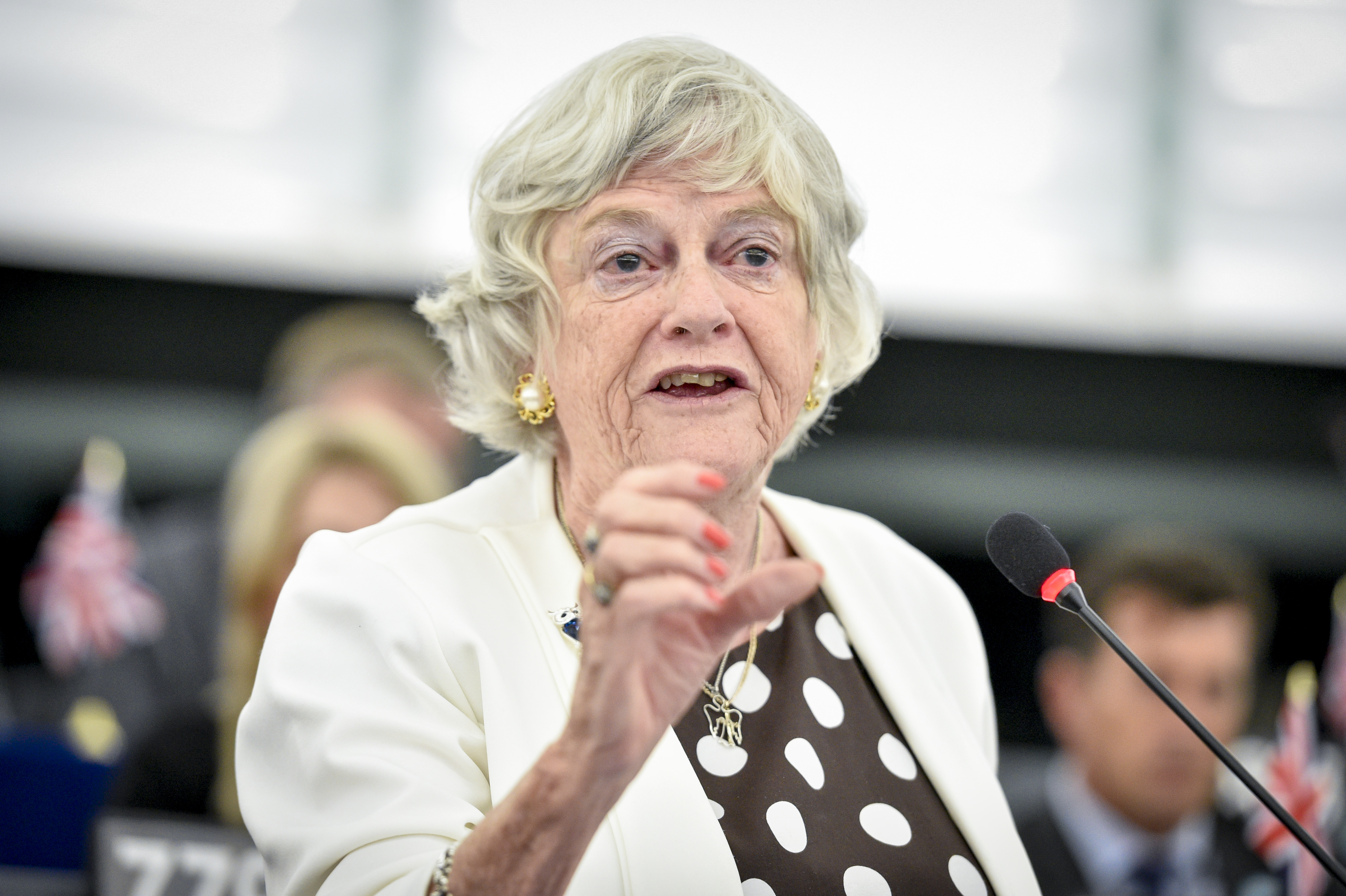
Widdecombe speaking in the European Parliament in July 2019

She entered the European Parliament in 2019 as a Brexit Party MEP for South West England and sat on the European Parliament Committee on Civil Liberties, Justice and Home Affairs (LIBE). On 3 July 2019 she used her maiden speech in Strasbourg to compare Brexit to slaves revolting against their owners and to a colonised country rising up against occupying forces, a stance that was criticised by some members of both the European Parliament and the UK House of Commons. Her tenure as an MEP ended with the UK's withdrawal from the EU on 31 January 2020.

Widdecombe stood as the Brexit Party candidate for Plymouth Sutton and Devonport in the 2019 general election; she came a distant third but narrowly retained her deposit with 5.5% of the vote. Nigel Farage said that she was told by the Conservative Party that she would be part of their Brexit negotiations if she stood down as a candidate.

In 2023, she rejoined the party – now renamed Reform UK – and became their immigration and justice spokesperson.

== Political views ==
=== Social issues ===
As an MP, Widdecombe expressed socially conservative views, including opposition to abortion. In 1998, while she was shadow health secretary, she said that she would not become Health Secretary as long as this involved responsibility for abortions. She was a committed Christian who characterised the issue as one of life and death, but insisted her view had been the same when she was agnostic. She was a member of the Society for the Protection of Unborn Children (SPUC) while studying at Oxford. During her time in Parliament, Widdecombe was a member of the Pro-Life All Party Parliamentary Group, which met with SPUC over concerns the organisation's more strident approach to abortion policy could alienate Protestant and atheist supporters.

She was an opponent of assisted dying in any form, saying that any such legislation would fail to "protect the mentally ill, disabled and the frail elderly". She further commented: "You cannot get to my age without having seen loved ones suffer [...] or having seen dear friends die in pain. And, yes, I too have thought 'We wouldn't do this to an animal'. But that emotional indignation has also to be extended to those whom any euthanasia law would threaten."

==== LGBT issues ====
Widdecombe voiced support for the partial decriminalisation of homosexuality in 1967 in England and Wales. She subsequently opposed further reforms while in Parliament. Out of the 17 parliamentary votes between 1998 and 2008 considered by the Public Whip website to concern equal rights for homosexuals, Widdecombe took the opposing position in 15 cases, not being present at the other two votes. In 1999, Widdecombe stated that "I do not think that [homosexuality] can be promoted as an equally valid lifestyle to [heterosexual] marriage, but I would say the same about irregular heterosexual arrangements."

She consistently argued against an equal age of consent for same-sex relationships, voting against a 1994 act (which would have reduced the age of consent for some male-male sexual activity from 21 to 18), and in 1998 (arguing against a further reduction from 18 to 16, which later occurred in 2000). On the latter act, she wrote in The Mail on Sunday that "one of the sundry horrors for which this Government is likely to be remembered will be that it gave its imprimatur to sodomy at 16". She later said in 2000: "I do not believe that issues of equality should override the imperatives of protecting the young." Widdecombe opposed the repeal of Section 28 of the Local Government Act 1988. In 2012, Widdecombe voiced support in the Daily Express for the practice of conversion therapy, which claims to change the orientation of homosexuals.

Widdecombe also expressed her opposition to same-sex marriage, introduced by David Cameron's government in 2014, arguing that "the state must have a preferred model" which is "a union that is generally open to procreation". Despite her personal opposition, in 2019 she stated that she did not support the abolition of same-sex marriage, describing the idea as "daft". She also opposed gender self-identification for transgender people. In 2020, she expressed her opposition to same-sex dancing on Strictly Come Dancing, saying: "I don't think it is what viewers of Strictly, especially families, are looking for. But that's up to the audience and the programme."

In 2019, Widdecombe defended the comments she made in a 2012 article that supported "gay conversion" therapy. She told Sky News that science may yet "produce an answer" to the question of whether people can "switch sexuality". Following Widdecombe's apparent endorsement of conversion therapy, at least one venue, the Landmark Theatre in Ilfracombe, Devon, cancelled a performance of her one-woman show.

=== Criminal justice ===
In her speech at the 2000 Conservative conference, she called for a zero tolerance policy of prosecution, with the punishment of £100 fines for users of cannabis. This was well received by rank-and-file Conservative delegates.

Over the years, Widdecombe expressed her support for a reintroduction of the death penalty, which was banned for use in peacetime in the UK in 1965. She notably spoke of her support for its reintroduction for the worst cases of murder in the aftermath of the murder of two 10-year-old girls from Soham, Cambridgeshire, in August 2002, arguing that in the five years up to 1970 during which the death penalty was suspended, the national murder rate had more than doubled.

=== Opposition to fox hunting ===
Widdecombe consistently voted for the ban on the hunting of foxes. She was among more than 20 high-profile people who signed a letter to members of Parliament in 2015 to oppose David Cameron's plan to amend the Hunting Act 2004.

=== Environmental and science issues ===
In 2007, Widdecombe wrote that she did not want to belittle the issue of climate change, but was sceptical of the claims that specific actions would prevent catastrophe. In 2008, she wrote that her doubts had been "crystalised" by Nigel Lawson's book An Appeal to Reason; in 2014, she likened Lawson's difficulty in getting the book published to the book-burnings in Nazi Germany. In 2008, Widdecombe claimed that the "science of climate change is robustly disputed" and, in 2009, that "there is no climate change, hasn't anybody looked out of their window recently?" She was one of the five MPs who voted against the Climate Change Act 2008.

In February 2010, Widdecombe voted to support an early day motion in defence of homeopathy that challenged the report on the subject adopted by the Science and Technology Committee.

== Religious views ==
Widdecombe became an Anglican in her 30s, after a period of agnosticism following her departure from religious schooling. She converted to Roman Catholicism in 1993 after leaving the Church of England, explaining:

I left the Church of England because there was a huge bundle of straw. The ordination of women was the last straw, but it was only one of many. For years I had been disillusioned by the Church of England's compromising on everything. The Catholic Church doesn't care if something is unpopular.

In October 2006, she pledged to boycott British Airways due to their suspending a worker who refused to hide her Christian cross and maintained the boycott until the company reversed the suspension.

In 2010, Widdecombe declined the offer to be the UK's next ambassador to the Holy See because she was suffering from a detached retina. She was made a Dame of the Order of St. Gregory the Great by Pope Benedict XVI for services to politics and public life on 31 January 2013.

== Media work and appearances ==
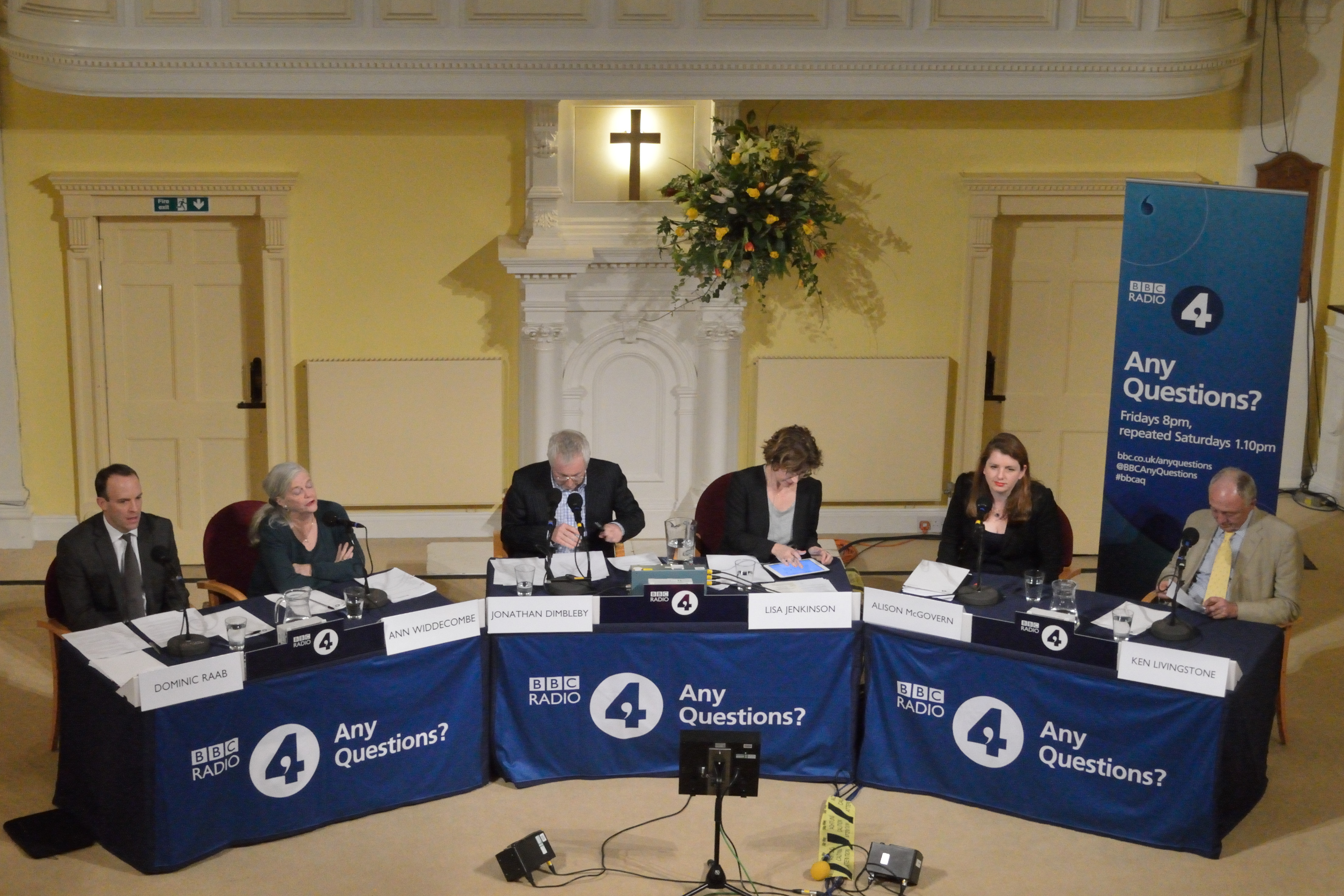
Widdecombe in an Any Questions? broadcast in 2016 at the Nexus Methodist Church, Bath

=== Reality television ===
In 2002, Widdecombe took part in the ITV programme Celebrity Fit Club. In 2005, she appeared in a new series of Celebrity Fit Club, this time as an agony aunt.

From September to December 2010, Widdecombe appeared as a contestant on the eighth series of BBC One's dance competition Strictly Come Dancing. She was partnered with Anton Du Beke, and despite low marks from the judges and finishing bottom of the leaderboard seven out of the ten weeks they were in the competition, Widdecombe and Du Beke were popular with the show's viewers, and were ultimately voted through to the latter stages, before becoming the ninth couple to be eliminated in week 10, finishing in sixth place overall. The couple's dances throughout the series were strongly flavoured by comedy, and set several records for the lowest recorded score for a particular dance style in the programme's history.

In January 2018, Widdecombe participated as a housemate on the twenty-first series of Celebrity Big Brother. Widdecombe had turned down the opportunity to appear on the show several times before agreeing to take part. During her time in the house, she was criticised for comments regarding the Harvey Weinstein controversy and for remarks perceived as anti-LGBT to her housemates, most notably to drag queen Courtney Act (Shane Jenek). Widdecombe was popular with many of the progamme's viewers. She received 13 nominations from her housemates throughout the series but survived multiple evictions, ultimately reaching the final and finishing as runner-up, behind Jenek. In December of that year, Widdecombe returned for the 2018 Strictly Come Dancing Christmas Special, in which she was again partnered with Du Beke and they danced an American Smooth to "Sisters". They received 22 points out of 40 and ultimately did not win the special. She appeared in a Strictly Come Dancing during the 2012 Children in Need appeal night.

In 2017, Widdecombe took part in ITV's Sugar Free Farm.

In April and May 2015, Widdecombe took part in the BBC One series 24 Hours in the Past, alongside Colin Jackson, Alistair McGowan, Miquita Oliver, Tyger Drew-Honey, and Zoe Lucker, experiencing life as workers in a dustyard, coachhouse, pottery, and as workhouse inmates in 1840s Britain.

=== Presenting ===
In 2005, BBC Two broadcast six episodes of The Widdecombe Project, an agony-aunt television series.

Also in 2005, she presented the show Ann Widdecombe to the Rescue, in which she acted as an agony aunt, offering advice to disputing families, couples and others across the UK. She was the guest host of news quiz show Have I Got News for You twice, in 2006 and 2007. Her first appearance, in 2006, was widely regarded as a success. After her second appearance, Widdecombe said she would not return to the show because of comments made by panellist Jimmy Carr which she considered filth, though she described regular panellists Ian Hislop and Paul Merton as "the fastest wits in showbusiness".

In 2007 and 2008, Widdecombe fronted an ITV1 series titled Ann Widdecombe Versus, in which she spoke to various people about issues related to her work as an MP, with an emphasis on confronting those responsible for problems she wished to address. In 2007, she discussed prostitution, social benefits, and truancy. A fourth episode was broadcast on 18 September 2008, in which she travelled around London and Birmingham talking to girl gangs.

In 2012, she hosted 30 one-hour episodes of Cleverdicks, a quiz show for Sky Atlantic. On 4 November 2012, Widdecombe guest-hosted an episode of BBC's Songs of Praise about singleness.

=== Documentaries ===
In 2002, she appeared in a Louis Theroux documentary depicting her life in and out of politics.

In April 2012, she presented an hour-long documentary for BBC Radio 5 Live, Drunk Again: Ann Widdecombe Investigates, examining how British attitudes to alcohol consumption had changed in recent years.

In 2020, Widdecombe visited Halden Prison in Norway for the documentary The World's Most Luxurious Prison.

=== Other appearances ===
In 2005 she appeared in a discussion programme on Five about England's greatest monarch since the Norman Conquest; she chose Charles II.

In 2009 Widdecombe appeared with Archbishop John Onaiyekan in an "Intelligence Squared" debate defending the motion that the Catholic Church was a force for good. Stephen Fry and Christopher Hitchens argued against the motion and won the debate overall.

In 2009 she partially defended Carol Thatcher's use of the word 'golliwog' on Any Questions?, saying: "There is a generation to whom a golliwog is merely a toy, a generation which was much endeared by its golliwogs which grew up with them on jam jars ... and there is a generation, a new generation for whom that word is deeply offensive and one does have to make I think some allowance for the fact."

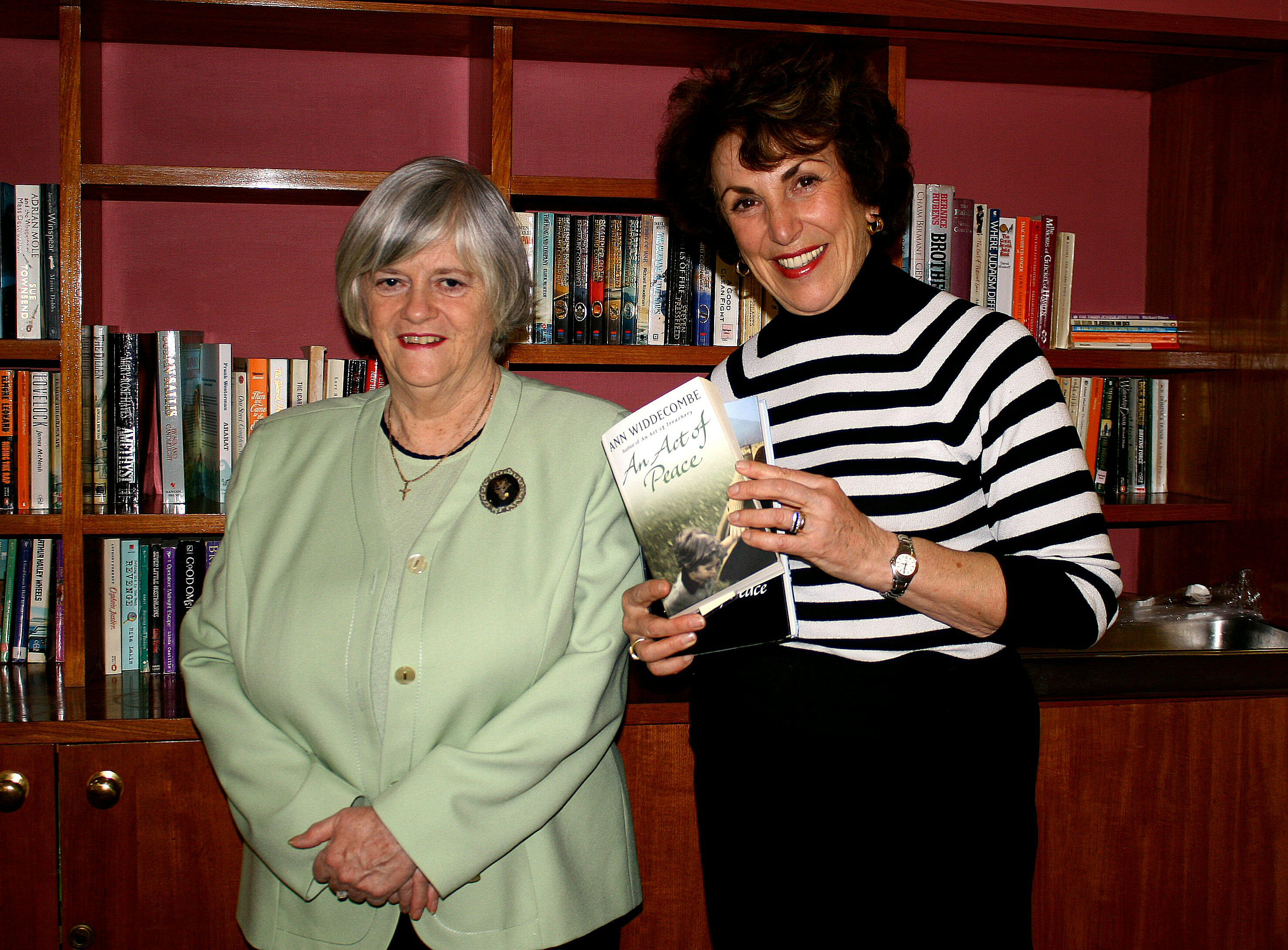
Widdecombe at a book club hosted by Edwina Currie in Clapham, 2010

Widdecombe made appearances in television shows such as Celebrity Antiques Road Trip, Tipping Point: Lucky Stars, the celebrity version of The Crystal Maze, and frequently appeared on Jeremy Vine.

=== Acting ===
Widdecombe appeared in "The Sound of Drums", the 12th episode of the third series of Doctor Who, endorsing the Master's Prime Minister campaign.

In 2011, Widdecombe played the Lord Mayoress in an episode of Sooty.

=== Pantomime ===
Following her retirement, Widdecombe made her stage debut on 9 December 2011 at the Orchard Theatre, Dartford, in the Christmas pantomime Snow White and the Seven Dwarfs, alongside Strictly Come Dancing judge Craig Revel Horwood. In April 2012, she appeared in a ten-minute-non-singing cameo in Gaetano Donizetti's comic opera La fille du régiment, playing the Duchesse de Crackentorp. She reprised her pantomime role, as "Widdy in Waiting", again with Horwood, at the Swan Theatre, High Wycombe, in December 2012.

In December 2016, Widdecombe stepped in at short notice to play the Evil Queen in Snow White and the Seven Dwarfs at Bridlington Spa, replacing the injured Lorraine Chase. In December 2017, she played the Empress of China in the pantomime Aladdin at the Marina Theatre in Lowestoft.

=== Writing ===
She wrote several novels, and her autobiography Strictly Ann was published in 2013.

In March 2004, she briefly became The Guardian's agony aunt, introduced with an interview by Emma Brockes.

== Personal life ==
Until her retirement following the 2010 general election, Widdecombe divided her time between homes in London and in the village of Sutton Valence, Kent, in her constituency. She sold both upon retiring. She shared her London home with her widowed mother, Rita Widdecombe, until Rita's death on 25 April 2007, aged 95. In March 2008, she bought a house in Haytor Vale, on Dartmoor in Devon, where she retired. Her brother, Malcolm (1937–2010), an Anglican canon in Bristol, retired in May 2009 and died in October 2010. Her nephew, Roger Widdecombe, is an Anglican priest.

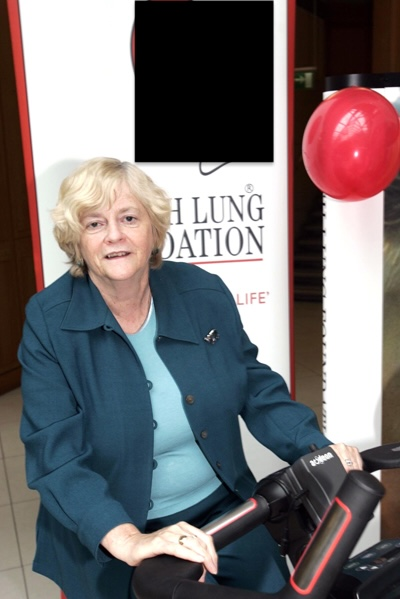
Widdecombe in 2006

She neither married nor had any children. In November 2007 on BBC Radio 4, she recalled how a journalist had once produced a profile assuming she had had at least "one sexual relationship", to which she replied: "Be careful, that's the way you get sued." When interviewer Jenni Murray asked if she had ever had a sexual relationship, Widdecombe laughed and said, "It's nobody else's business."

A 2001 report in The Guardian stated that she had a three-year romance while studying at the University of Oxford. Widdecombe confirmed this in January 2018 on the Channel 5 reality TV show Celebrity Big Brother, explaining that she had ended the romance to prioritise her career.

Widdecombe had a fondness for cats and other animals, including foxes; part of her website, the Widdyweb, was devoted to the pet cats and goats she had lived with. She adopted two goats at the Buttercups Goat Sanctuary in Boughton Monchelsea, near Maidstone. In an interview, she spoke of her appreciation of music, despite describing herself as "pretty well tone-deaf".

Widdecombe wrote novels and a weekly column for the Daily Express. In January 2011, Widdecombe was president of the North of England Education Conference in Blackpool, where she gave a speech supporting selective education and opposing the ban on building new grammar schools. She also became a patron of The Grace Charity for M.E.

In April 2012, Widdecombe said that she was writing her autobiography, which she described as "rude about all and sundry, but an amount of truth is always necessary." Her autobiography Strictly Ann: The Autobiography, was published in 2013 and was variously described as "forthright", "candid", and "rude". Widdecombe was a patron of the charity Safe Haven for Donkeys in the Holy Land (SHADH) and in 2014 visited the SHADH Donkey Sanctuary in the West Bank.

== Death ==
Widdecombe was found dead in her home in Haytor Vale, on the edge of Dartmoor, Devon, at about 11:40 am on 9 July 2026, and was pronounced dead at 12:20 pm. Police said they believed she was attacked at approximately 12:30 pm on 8 July. She had been scheduled to appear via Zoom on the Channel 5 programme Matt Allwright at 1 pm on 8 July, last contacting a researcher for the programme at 12:19 pm. She failed to join the Zoom call and did not respond to attempts at contact from the production team, who then alerted her agent. Her gardener, due at the property on 9 July, was asked by her agent to conduct a welfare check. He found her dead, lying face down on the kitchen floor with a serious head injury. Her death was made public on the morning of 10 July. On 21 July, a provisional cause of death was given as blunt force injury. Widdecombe's funeral took place at Buckfast Abbey on 12 August. A public memorial is planned for later in 2026.

=== Murder investigation ===
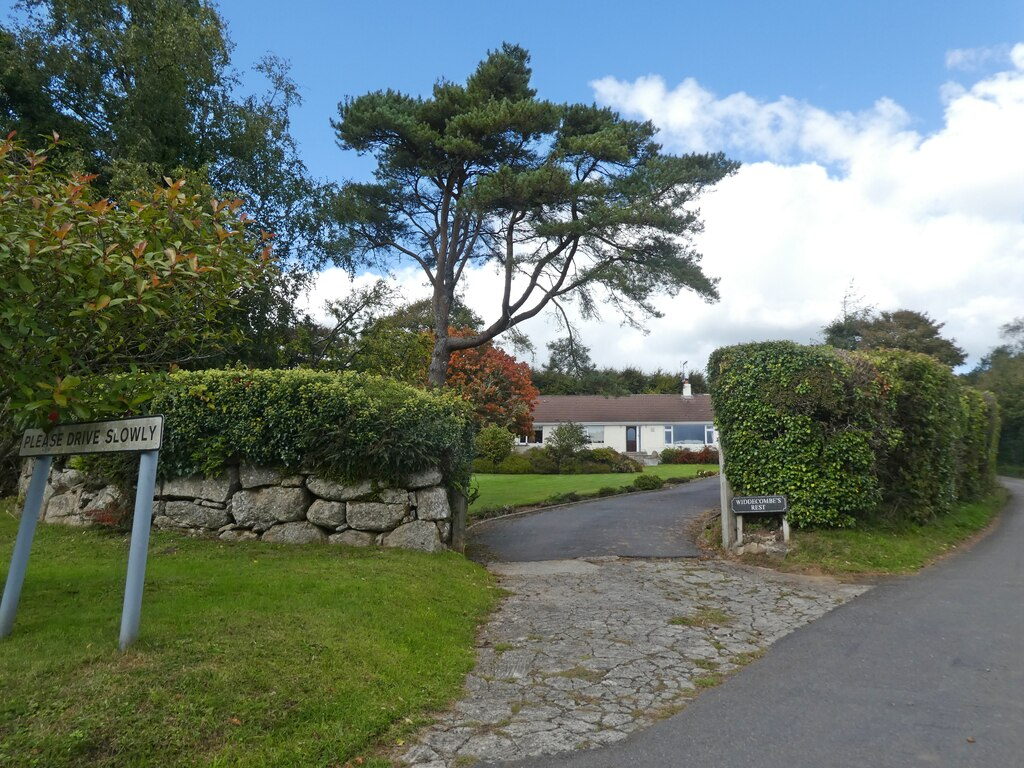
Widdecombe's home, in Haytor Vale, where her body was discovered

On 10 July, Devon and Cornwall Police said that Widdecombe's body had been discovered with "serious injuries" and that they had launched a murder investigation. They stated that, while they were keeping an open mind, there was nothing at that point to suggest the killing was politically motivated or terror-related. A man was arrested the same day on suspicion of murder, but was released the next day without charge and was declared by police to be no longer part of the investigation.

A 28-year-old British man was arrested on 11 July in Rotherham, South Yorkshire, approximately 270 miles (430 km) from Widdecombe's home. On 13 July, Counter Terrorism Policing South East (CTPSE) took charge of the investigation following new information. However, the head of Counter Terrorism Policing stated the next day that Widdecombe's suspected murder had not been declared a terrorist incident, and that the terrorism investigation was running separately from the murder investigation. On 13 July, the suspect was re-arrested on suspicion of commission, preparation or instigation of acts of terrorism. Police subsequently obtained a warrant of further detention under the Terrorism Act 2000, allowing them to hold the suspect without charge for up to seven days. He was charged with Widdecombe's murder on 20 July. In their charges, police stated that the attack indicated Widdecombe was "clearly targeted", with the motive still under investigation. In August, counter terrorism police reopened an attempted burglary case from April 2025 at a property in London linked to Reform UK leader Nigel Farage, which they believed may have been connected.

==== Inquest ====
An inquest into Widdecombe's death opened on 21 July, led by Philip Spinney, the senior coroner for Devon. It was immediately adjourned after the first hearing until the conclusion of the criminal proceedings against the accused. Before the adjournment, the inquest heard that a post-mortem examination had failed to determine the precise cause of death.

==== Court proceedings ====
The first hearing for Widdecombe's suspected murder was held on 21 July at Westminster Magistrates' Court. The prosecution, led by Kashif Malik, said that CCTV footage showed the suspect entering through Widdecombe's front door on 8 July, wearing black gloves, and then entering the kitchen where she was eating lunch, hiding a hammer from her view. They said that the suspect asked, "Don't suppose you have bank cards and ID?" before attacking her and stealing her wallet. The court further heard that Widdecombe died after being hit on the head with the hammer 21 times. The suspect was said to have been in Widdecombe's home for around two minutes. The case was then sent to the Old Bailey, where the suspect also appeared on the afternoon of 21 July. He was remanded in custody at HMP Belmarsh, pending further appearances and hearings with a provisional trial date set for 8 June 2027. On 2 October 2026, the suspect was charged with preparation of terrorist acts, allegedly from May 2024 to July 2026 and allegedly including acts against Nigel Farage. On 9 October 2026, the prosecutors asked an Old Bailey judge to combine both sets of charges into a single case, as they were "inextricably linked", claiming the accused had a "terrorist connection" and that he was "politically and ideologically motivated". The judge agreed to the prosecutor's request and the defendant's KC, indicated that the accused was "likely to contest all of the charges against him".

=== Tributes and reactions ===
Widdecombe's death led to expressions of condolence and support for the murder investigation from many British politicians and public figures. Conservative leader Kemi Badenoch called her a "formidable politician who was never afraid to speak her mind". Previous Conservative leaders also expressed their condolences, such as Iain Duncan Smith, who described her as "refreshing"; Boris Johnson, who called her a "heroic Brexiteer [who] could move Tory audiences to ecstasy"; Liz Truss, who described her as "always great fun", and Rishi Sunak, who called her "a formidable public servant and a distinctive voice in British politics for many years". Helen Grant, who succeeded Widdecombe in her Maidstone seat, called for the installation of a memorial in her honour at the Palace of Westminster.

Reform UK leader Nigel Farage said he was "deeply, deeply upset by the nature of her death", and laid a wreath at Dartmoor National Park near her home on 11 July. He also stated that Reform UK were supporting the police investigation, pointing to the party's analysis of their email inbox to identify potential abuse directed towards Widdecombe in the lead-up to her death. The leader of Kent County Council, Linden Kemkaran of Reform UK, described her as "a force of nature and a national treasure". An outdoor memorial service on 12 July at Buckfast Abbey was attended by Zia Yusuf, Reform UK's home affairs spokesman, and Reform UK MPs Richard Tice, Danny Kruger and Lee Anderson. Tice, the deputy leader of Reform UK, called Widdecombe "a colossus [and] a legend".

The then prime minister, Keir Starmer, called her a "distinguished politician over many, many years with many achievements" and urged the public to rise above political differences. Ed Davey, leader of the Liberal Democrats, said that Widdecombe "was a woman of deep faith who devoted her life to public service".

Anton Du Beke, Widdecombe's partner on Strictly Come Dancing in 2010, said he "had the most brilliant time with Ann" and said that "she became a real friend". Broadcaster Jeremy Vine, whose titular programme Widdecombe frequently appeared on, called it "almost impossible to take in". Tributes were also paid by Widdecombe's Celebrity Big Brother 21 co-stars Ashley James and Amanda Barrie, broadcasters Iain Dale and Piers Morgan, and the charity Safe Haven for Donkeys in the Holy Land, of which Widdecombe had been the patron since 2002.

=== Aftermath ===
Widdecombe's death led to debate about the safety of politicians in Britain. Commentators noted that Widdecombe's suspected murder was the third killing of a British politician in a decade, after Jo Cox and David Amess. Andy Burnham called for a review of security protocols for MPs, stating that social media had built toxicity in politics. Reform UK increased security for its MPs following Widdecombe's death. Yusuf accused politicians and the media of incitement contributing to Widdecombe's death, saying that there was "a relentless narrative from politicians and the media, that Reform UK is a threat". Home Secretary Shabana Mahmood said that she recognised the concern of the party regarding its security, and offered Farage an appointment with the Royal and VIP Executive Committee to discuss further protections.

Police were criticised for initially ruling out a political motivation for Widdecombe's suspected murder by the Independent Reviewer of Terrorism Legislation Jonathan Hall, figures in Reform UK; and The Times newspaper, who said the force's "bizarre" actions "sowed needless confusion". Alison Hernandez, the Devon and Cornwall Police and Crime Commissioner, acknowledged criticism but defended the force's actions as "not unusual in a fast-paced investigation".

On 16 July, a trans employee named Heather Herbert working for the University of Aberdeen was arrested and charged over a social media post appearing to celebrate Widdecombe's death. Herbert expressed the hope that Widdecombe's death had been "extremely painful", and criticized Widdecombe's views against same-sex marriage and abortion. The university stated that it would investigate the comments. Police Scotland had initially said the comments were not criminal.

Widdecombe's funeral was a Requiem Mass at Buckfast Abbey, Devon, held on 12 August; the private service included a homily by David Charlesworth, the abbot of Buckfast. The service also included tributes from Widdecombe's nephew Roger Widdecombe and her close friend Sir Christian Sweeting. With a congregation of around 100 family members, the service was also attended by shadow chancellor Mel Stride, former justice minister Crispin Blunt and broadcaster Iain Dale.

== Honours ==
- Widdecombe was appointed an Honorary Fellow of Canterbury Christ Church University at a ceremony held at Canterbury Cathedral on 30 January 2009.
- She was awarded the honorary degree of Doctor of the University (DUniv) by the University of Birmingham on 5 July 2012.
- The Holy See invested her as a Dame of the Order of St. Gregory the Great (DSG) in 2013.

== In popular culture ==
In 2000, comedian Victoria Wood wrote and performed a song about Widdecombe for the finale musical number of her television Christmas special Victoria Wood with All the Trimmings. Wood asked for Widdecombe's permission to perform the song, which Widdecombe described as "ultra considerate".

== Selected publications ==
=== Fiction ===
- 2000: The Clematis Tree. London: Weidenfeld & Nicolson. ISBN 0-297-64572-2
- 2002: An Act of Treachery. London: Weidenfeld & Nicolson. ISBN 0-297-64573-0
- 2005: Father Figure. London: Weidenfeld & Nicolson. ISBN 0-297-82962-9
- 2005: An Act of Peace. London: Weidenfeld & Nicolson. ISBN 0-297-82958-0

=== Non-fiction ===
- 1999: Inspired and Outspoken: The Collected Speeches of Ann Widdecombe; edited by John Simmons, with a biographical preface by Nick Kochan. London: Politico's Publishing. ISBN 1-902301-22-6
- 2004: The Mass Is a Mess, with Martin Kochanski. London: Catholic Writers' Guild
- 2013: Strictly Ann: The Autobiography. London: Weidenfeld & Nicolson. ISBN 978-1780220925

== Notes ==
Parliament of the United Kingdom
| Preceded by John Wells | Member of Parliament for Maidstone; 1987–1997 | Constituency abolished |
| New constituency | Member of Parliament for Maidstone and The Weald; 1997–2010 | Succeeded by Helen Grant |
Political offices
| Preceded by John Maples | Shadow Secretary of State for Health; 1998–1999 | Succeeded by Liam Fox |
| Preceded by Norman Fowler | Shadow Home Secretary; 1999–2001 | Succeeded by Oliver Letwin |
European Parliament
| Preceded by William Dartmouth | Member of the European Parliament for South West England; 2019–2020 | Constituency abolished |
