= Richard Rose Morton Academy =

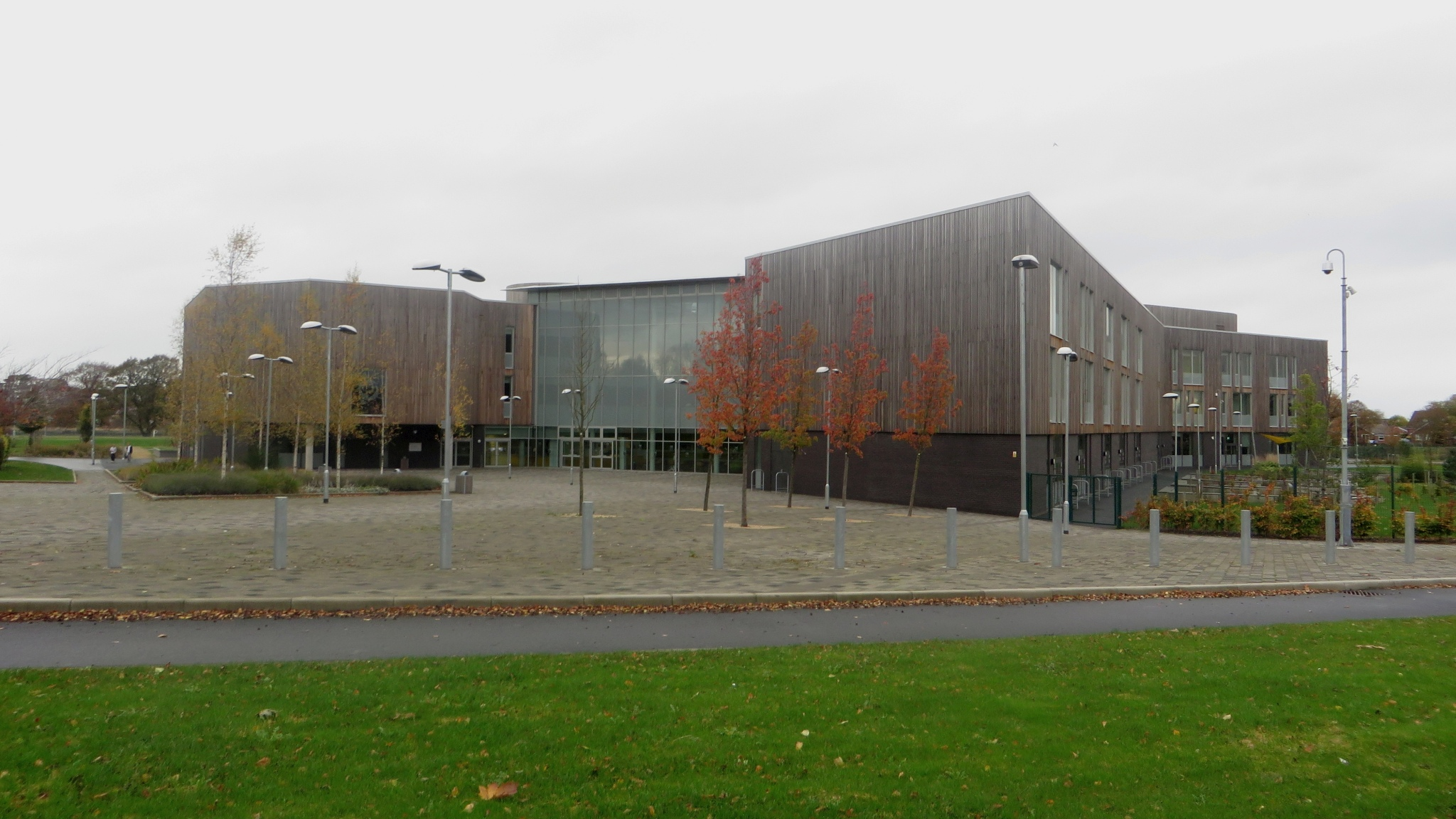

Location
- Wigton Road; Carlisle, Cumbria, CA2 6LB; England
- Coordinates: 54.881°N 2.972°W

Information
- Type: Academy
- Local authority: Cumberland Council
- Department for Education URN: 135620 Tables
- Ofsted: Reports
- Principal: Michael McClelland
- Gender: Coeducational
- Age: 11 to 16
- Website: www.rrma.org.uk

Richard Rose Morton Academy (also known as Morton Academy, formerly Morton School) is a coeducational secondary school with academy status, located in the Morton area of Carlisle, Cumbria, England.

The school converted to academy status on 1 September 2009, and is in a federation with Richard Rose Central Academy, part of United Learning.

As Morton School, it was a secondary modern, which became comprehensive in the late 1960s.
