= Mobilicoccus =

Scientific classification
- Domain: Bacteria
- Kingdom: Bacillati
- Phylum: Actinomycetota
- Class: Actinomycetes
- Order: Micrococcales
- Family: Dermatophilaceae
- Genus: Mobilicoccus; Hamada et al. 2011

Type species
- Mobilicoccus pelagius Hamada et al. 2011

Species
- M. caccae Chen et al. 2017; "M. massiliensis" Mathlouthi et al. 2017; M. pelagius Hamada et al. 2011

Genus of bacteria

Mobilicoccus is a genus of bacteria from the family Dermatophilaceae.
