= Piscicoccus intestinalis =

Scientific classification
- Domain: Bacteria
- Kingdom: Bacillati
- Phylum: Actinomycetota
- Class: Actinomycetes
- Order: Micrococcales
- Family: Dermatophilaceae
- Genus: Piscicoccus; Hamada et al. 2011
- Species: P. intestinalis

Binomial name
- Piscicoccus intestinalis Hamada et al. 2011

Type strain
- DSM 22761; NBRC 104926; Ngc37-23

Genus of bacteria

Piscicoccus intestinalis is a species of bacteria from the family Dermatophilaceae which has been isolated from the gut of the fish Repomucenus richardsonii from Japan.
