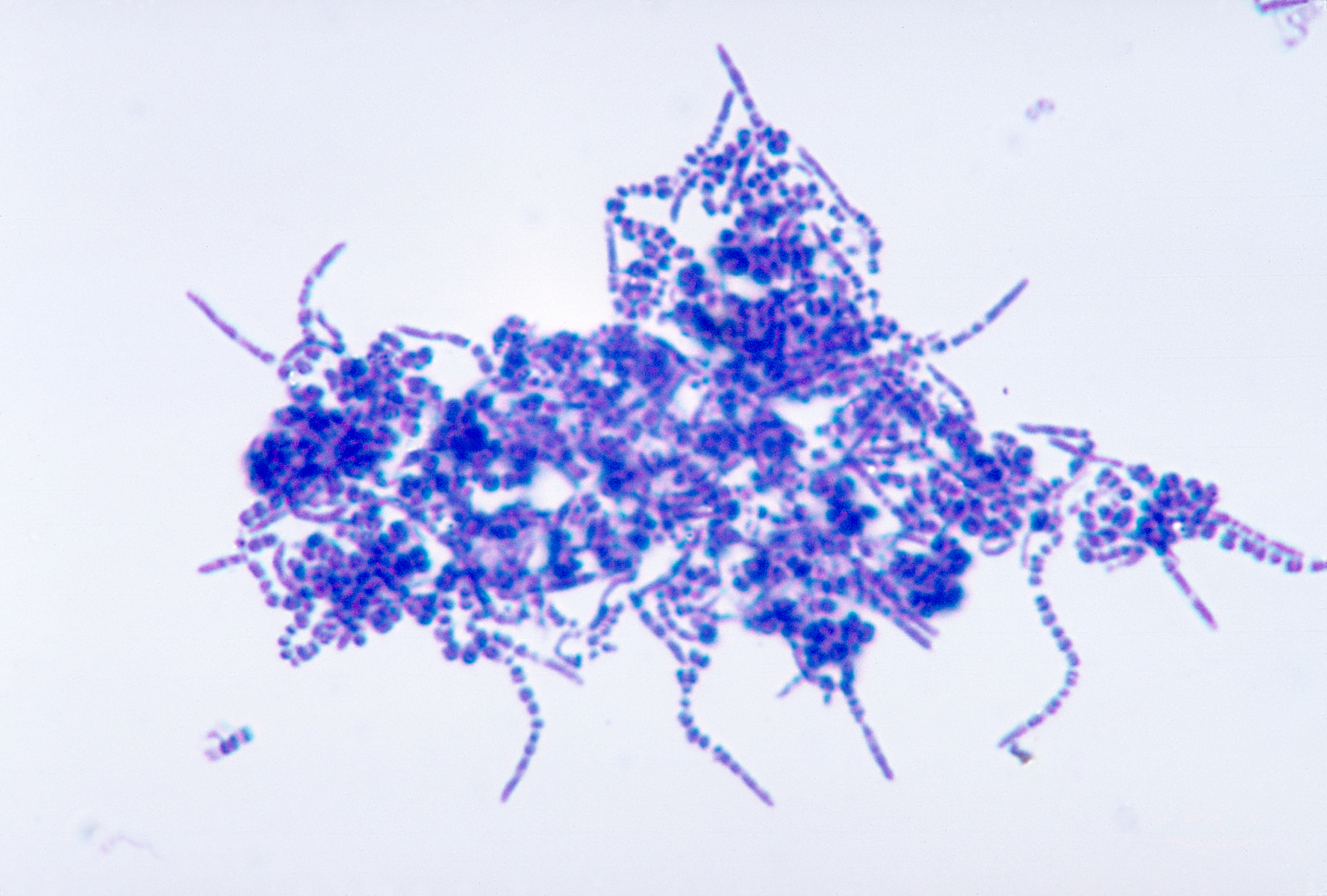
- This micrograph demonstrates a clustering of Dermatophilus congolensis bacteria using a Giemsa stain.

Scientific classification
- Domain: Bacteria
- Kingdom: Bacillati
- Phylum: Actinomycetota
- Class: Actinomycetes
- Order: Micrococcales
- Family: Dermatophilaceae
- Genus: Dermatophilus (Van Saceghem 1915) Gordon 1964 (Approved Lists 1980)
- Species: D. congolensis

Binomial name
- Dermatophilus congolensis (Van Saceghem 1915) Gordon 1964 (Approved Lists 1980)

= Dermatophilus =

Species of bacterium

Dermatophilus congolensis is a Gram-positive bacterium and the cause of a disease called dermatophilosis (sometimes called mud fever) in animals and humans, a dermatologic condition that manifests as the formation of crusty scabs containing the microorganism. It has been erroneously called mycotic dermatitis. Rain scald is another condition often seen in animals, which is also caused by D. congolensis. It is the only accepted species in the genus Dermatophilus.

== Morphology ==
Dermatophilus congolensis is a facultative anaerobic actinomycete. It has two morphologic forms - filamentous hyphae and motile zoospores. The hyphae are characterized by branching filaments (1-5 μm in diameter) that ultimately fragment by both transverse and longitudinal separation into packets of coccoid cells. The coccoid cells mature into flagellated ovoid zoospores (0.6-1.0 μm in diameter). With the microscope, one can observe the characteristic "tramcar line"–like D. congolensis colonies together with Gram-positive thin filaments and coccoid forms.

== Cultivation ==
Dermatophilus congolensis is a carboxyphilic germ, so needs carbon dioxide to properly grow on laboratory media. The germ grows well on sheep blood-enriched agarose medium; the medium must then be incubated at 37 °C and in a 5-10% CO_{2} atmosphere. Colonies become visible in 24–48 hours. Initially, they are small, with about a 1.0-mm diameter and with a grey-yellow colour. After 3–4 days, the isolated bacterial colonies can reach a 3-mm diameter, and they have a rough surface and yellow-golden pigmentation. Beta hemolysis can be seen around the colonies.

== Pathogenesis ==
Dermatophilus congolensis causes severe skin infections in animals and humans. More frequently, cattle, horses, sheep, and goats are affected. Humans can also get this skin disease if elementary hygiene measures are not observed after dealing with infected animals. This dermatologic condition is known by many names - cutaneous streptotrichosis (on cattle, goats, and horses), rain scald (on horses), lumpy wool (on sheep), and strawberry foot rot.

The pathogenic factors are very diverse, but the most important ones are of an enzymatic nature (adenase and lecithinase).

== Etymology and discovery ==
From the Greek derma (skin) + philos (loving), Dermatophilus congolensis is a Gram-positive, aerobic actinomycete, and facultatively anaerobic bacteria. D. congolensis infects the epidermis and produces exudative dermatitis termed dermatophilosis that was previously known as rain rot, rain scald, streptotrichosis, and mycotic dermatitis.

In 1915, René Van Saceghem, a Belgian military veterinarian stationed at a veterinary laboratory in the former Belgian Congo (thus, the species name congolensis), reported D. congolensis from exudative dermatitis in cattle. Local breeders and veterinarians had observed the disease since 1910, but the causal agent was not identified.
