= Kineosphaera =

Scientific classification
- Domain: Bacteria
- Kingdom: Bacillati
- Phylum: Actinomycetota
- Class: Actinomycetes
- Order: Micrococcales
- Family: Dermatophilaceae
- Genus: Kineosphaera; Liu et al. 2002

Type species
- Kineosphaera limosa Liu et al. 2002

Species
- K. limosa Liu et al. 2002; "K. nakaumiensis" Yamada et al. 2013

Genus of bacteria

Kineosphaera is a Gram-positive, strictly aerobic non-spore-forming and motile genus of bacteria from the family Dermatophilaceae. Kineosphaera limosa has been isolated from activated sludge from Ibaraki Prefecture in Japan.
