= Safe Haven for Donkeys in the Holy Land =

British charity caring for donkeys in Israel and the Palestinian Territories

- Abbreviation: Safe Haven for Donkeys
- Formation: 2000; 26 years ago
- Type: Non-profit
- Headquarters: United Kingdom
- Location: Netanya, Israel
- Region served: Israel; State of Palestine; Egypt
- Services: Care for working and abandoned donkeys, free veterinary clinics
- Website: safehaven4donkeys.org

Safe Haven for Donkeys in the Holy Land is a British registered charity that cares for working and abandoned donkeys in Israel, Egypt and the State of Palestine.

The organisation, which was established in 2000, runs a 1.5-hectare (4-acre) donkey sanctuary near the Israeli town of Netanya and a smaller facility in the Palestinian village of Arranah. At the beginning of 2026, Safe Haven's two sites were home to around 210 donkeys.

Safe Haven also runs a programme of free veterinary clinics for working donkeys, mules and horses in the Palestinian Territories. The three mobile teams regularly visit towns and villages where they offer free veterinary care, advice on tooth and hoof care, harnessing and education and support for the owners. There is also a permanent clinic in the Palestinian city of Nablus.

In 2023, Safe Haven expanded its work to Egypt where they now have two mobile veterinary teams working in the brick kilns of El Saff where donkeys are still widely used. In 2026, they began operating a third team in the towns and villages of the Aswan governorate.

In 2024, in response to the desperate need in the region, the charity began operating a mobile first aid clinic for donkeys, mules and horses in the Gaza Strip.

The charity's Royal Patron is Princess Alexandra. Other patrons include the Earl of Stockton, actor Peter Egan, journalist and broadcaster Kay Burley, broadcaster Des Lynam, and author and journalist Julie Burchill. Before their deaths, both in 2026, actor Anthony Head, and former MP and author Ann Widdecombe were patrons.

== See also ==
- Why vets are risking all to care for Gaza's donkeys
- Working donkeys in the brick kilns of Egypt
