= Mobilicoccus caccae =

Scientific classification
- Domain: Bacteria
- Kingdom: Bacillati
- Phylum: Actinomycetota
- Class: Actinomycetes
- Order: Micrococcales
- Family: Dermatophilaceae
- Genus: Mobilicoccus
- Species: M. caccae

Binomial name
- Mobilicoccus caccae Chen et al. 2017

Type strain
- CCTCC AB 2013229; DSM 27611; YIM 101593

Species of bacterium

Mobilicoccus caccae is a Gram-negative, facultatively anaerobic and motile bacterium from the genus of Mobilicoccus which has been isolated from the feces of a primate (Rhinopithecus roxellana) from the Yunnan Wild Animal Park, Yunnan Province, China.
