= Mud fever =

Horse disease

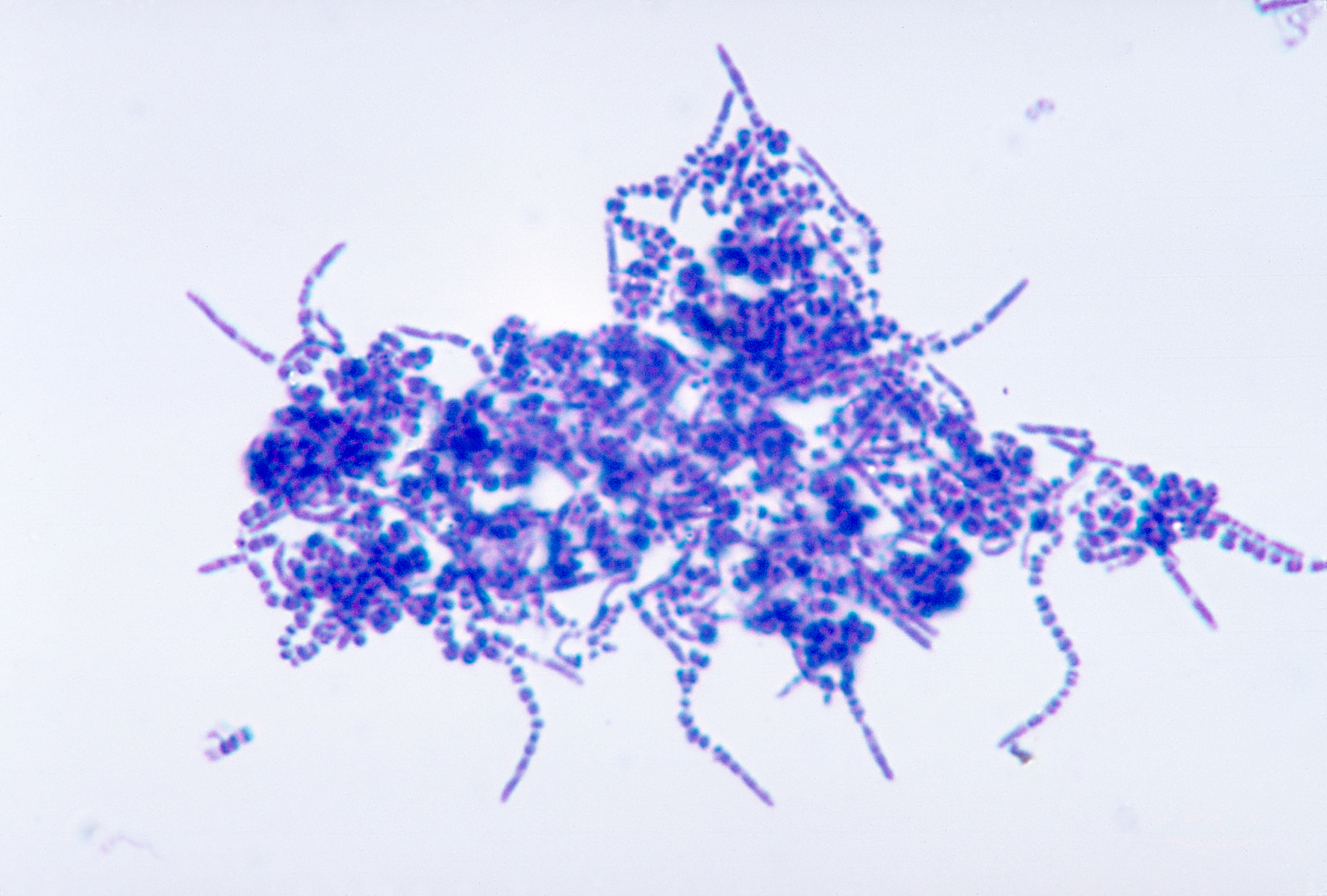
Dermatophilus congolensis, a causative agent of mud fever

Mud fever, also known as scratches or pastern dermatitis, is a group of diseases of horses causing irritation and dermatitis in the lower limbs of horses. Often caused by a mixture of bacteria, typically Dermatophilus congolensis and Staphylococcus spp., mud fever can also be caused by fungal organisms (dermatophytes). Photosensitization, chorioptic mange mites, contact dermatitis, and other conditions also contribute to some cases. This condition is also known as dew poisoning, grease, grease heel, or greasy heel.

== Cause ==
Mud fever is caused by an infection of the skin by bacteria, including Dermatophilus congolensis, and often Staphylococcus spp. Dermatophytes and other fungal organisms such as Malassezia can also contribute, as can chorioptic mange mites. Photosensitivity or irritant contact may contribute in certain cases. Rarely, vasculitis can cause continued inflammation.

== See also ==
- Rainscald
