= Maidstone and Malling =

UK Parliament constituency (since 2024)

Coordinates: 51.29°N 0.47°E

- County constituency for the House of Commons
- Boundaries since 2024
- Boundary of Maidstone and Malling in South East England
- County: Kent
- Electorate: 73,084 (2023)

Current constituency
- Created: 2024
- Member of Parliament: Helen Grant (Conservative)
- Seats: One
- Created from: Maidstone and The Weald

Maidstone and Malling is a constituency of the House of Commons in the UK Parliament. It was created under the 2023 review of Westminster constituencies, and was first contested in the 2024 general election. It is represented by Helen Grant of the Conservatives, who was MP for the predecessor seat of Maidstone and The Weald from 2010 to 2024.

== Constituency profile ==
Maidstone and Malling covers most of the large town of Maidstone (excluding its eastern suburbs), the small market town of West Malling and the villages of East Malling, Ditton, Leybourne and Kings Hill. Maidstone is a historic town and is the largest town in Kent. It has a history of paper manufacturing. Maidstone has average levels of wealth and deprivation whilst the villages to its west, including the newly-developed Kings Hill, are more affluent. House prices in the constituency are higher than the national average but lower than the rest of South East England.

In general, residents of Maidstone and Malling have average levels of education and homeownership. Household income rates are higher than the rest of the country and similar to the regional average, and the child poverty rate is low. A high percentage of residents work in healthcare and the public sector. White people made up 87% of the population at the 2021 census. At the district council level, most of Maidstone is represented by Liberal Democrat councillors whilst the villages in the west primarily elected Conservatives. At the county council, which held an election in 2025, there was some Reform UK support in Maidstone. An estimated 56% of voters in the constituency supported leaving the European Union in the 2016 referendum, higher than the nationwide figure of 52%.

== Boundaries ==
Under the 2023 review of Westminster constituencies, the constituency was defined as comprising the following, as they existed on 1 December 2020:

- The Borough of Maidstone wards of Allington, Barming and Teston, Bridge, East, Fant, Heath, High Street, North and South – approximately 67% of the abolished Maidstone and The Weald seat, mainly comprising the town of Maidstone itself.
- The Tonbridge and Malling Borough wards of Aylesford South and Ditton from Chatham and Aylesford.
- The Tonbridge and Malling Borough wards of East Malling, Kings Hill, and West Malling and Leybourne from Tonbridge and Malling (renamed Tonbridge).

Following local government boundary reviews in Tonbridge and Malling and Maidstone which came into effect in May 2023 and May 2024 respectively, the constituency now comprises the following from the 2024 general election:

- The Borough of Maidstone wards or part wards of: Allington & Bridge; Barming Heath and Teston; Fant & Oakwood; Grove Green & Vinters Park (part); High Street; Loose & Linton (part); Palace Wood; Penenden Heath; Ringlestone; Tovil.
- The Borough of Tonbridge and Malling wards or part wards of: Aylesford North & North Downs (small part); Aylesford South & Ditton; Birling, Leybourne & Ryarsh (majority); East Malling, West Malling & Offham (most); Kings Hill.

== Members of Parliament ==
Maidstone and The Weald prior to 2024

Election	Member	Party
2024	Helen Grant	Conservative

== Elections ==
=== Elections in the 2020s ===
General election 2024: Maidstone and Malling
Party	Candidate	Votes	%	±%
Conservative	Helen Grant	14,146	30.5	−27.9
Labour	Maureen Cleator	12,472	26.9	+8.5
Reform	Paul Thomas	9,316	20.1	N/A
Liberal Democrats	David Naghi	6,375	13.7	−4.9
Green	Stuart Jeffery	3,727	8.0	+4.2
Independent	Yolande Kenward	197	0.4	−0.3
British Democrats	Gary Butler	156	0.3	N/A
Majority		1,674	3.6	−36.2
Turnout		46,389	60.7	−6.2
Registered electors		76,449		
Conservative hold		Swing	−18.2	

=== Elections in the 2010s ===
2019 notional result
Party	Vote	%
Conservative	28,562	58.4
Liberal Democrats	9,114	18.6
Labour	8,993	18.4
Green	1,880	3.8
Others	358	0.7
Turnout	48,907	66.9
Electorate	73,084	

== See also ==
- parliamentary constituencies in Kent
- List of parliamentary constituencies in the South East England (region)
