= North of England Education Conference =

Annual UK education conference

- Frequency: Annual
- Country: United Kingdom
- Inaugurated: 1903

The North of England Education Conference (NEEC) was the UK’s biggest annual education conference. The first Conference took place in Manchester in 1903. The event provided an opportunity for senior decision makers in education, Children’s Services, the public sector, associated agencies and organisations to meet and consider the latest thinking and legislation affecting children and young people. In recent years the scope of the conference had expanded to encompass the broader children’s services agenda.

Despite the conference name, delegates attended from across the UK and beyond. In recent years the conference took place outside of the North of England, including Belfast and Cardiff. In 2015 the conference was to be hosted in Manchester between 14–16 January, but was cancelled and has not been held since.

== Delegates ==
Within recent years the focus of the conference had expanded. Whilst still having education at its core, a broader children’s agenda was embraced. Attendees included Directors of Education, key elected members, headteachers, school governors, those engaged in research in Higher Education and partners from Health, Police and Voluntary Sector organisations.

== Speakers ==
The conference attracted high-profile speakers and notably the appropriate Secretary of State. This has included in recent years Ed Balls, Ruth Kelly, David Miliband, David Blunkett and Estelle Morris. The conference was often used as a platform to launch or 'sound out' changes in policy or legislation. Hosting authorities often worked in collaboration with local universities and colleges to tap into national and international expertise and research.

== Venues ==
Historically the Conference has taken place each January and has alternated in venue between the east and west of the Pennines. On occasion however, the Conference has been held outside the North of England. In 2004 the NEEC was held in Northern Ireland in Belfast and in 2008, the NEEC paid its first visit to Wales and Cardiff. In January 2014 the last conference was held in Nottingham.

== Development ==
Reflecting changes in recent years in the delivery of services to children, young people and families the conference focus had begun to reflect the wider children’s agenda encapsulated in Every Child Matters: Change for Children. Whilst the conference continued to provide high-profile speakers with an education focus, it had recently included speakers from other areas of the children’s workforce such as health, the police, business and the third sector. However the event, which generations of education policymakers viewed as a key moment of the year, now appears to be a thing of the past and by the time Michael Gove took over as education secretary in 2010, it was an event he was quite happy to miss, choosing to make major announcements elsewhere. No minister was due to appear in 2015.

== Governance ==
The NEEC operated under the governance formed by its membership as part of the North of England Education Conference Association. This is defined as "Those English Local Authorities within the Government Office areas for the North West, the North East and Yorkshire and the Humber, and also the higher education institutions lying in this area". Representatives from the host authority, their predecessor and the following years host were represented in the governance.

== Involvement of children and young people ==
A strong feature of the conference is the involvement of children and young people. Traditionally involved in artistic, musical and dramatic performance they had begun to play a wider role in the content of the programme. In January 2012 Blackpool had a young person co-preside over the conference for the first time along with President, Ann Widdecombe. In Nottingham in 2014 there was a separate Youth Conference running alongside the main event run by young people from the eight Core Cities.

== History of the Conference ==
In 1902, having seen the success of a conference for science teachers in London, JH Reynolds, Manchester City Council's Director of Technical Instruction, decided to replicate the conference in his home town. The conference, also with a science theme, was arranged for 2 and 3 January 1903 and attended by 3,200 teachers, lecturers, inspectors and local government employees. Built on this success the conference widened the agenda to cover all areas of the curriculum. With short input from a range of professionals the, conference has remained true to the original template and remained a fixture in the first week of the year.

In 1924 the political dimension was added and the Secretary of the State of the day has usually been in attendance ever since, the conference often serving as a platform for announcement to changes in legislation or educational approaches. Over the course of its history this has included: Anthony Crosland, Kenneth Baker, Kenneth Clarke, Shirley Williams and Margaret Thatcher. Kenneth Clarke, on assuming his post as Secretary of State, is reported to have been told it was the one conference he could not afford to miss.

== 2004-2014 ==
=== 2004: The five Northern Ireland Education and Libraries Boards in Belfast ===
The Conference in Belfast was attended by almost 1,000 delegates and was considered one of the most successful NEECs; (the typical attendance in England is 500 delegates). Amongst the speakers was David Miliband MP who gave a speech on Personalised Learning.

=== 2005 Manchester ===
The Centre for Educational Leadership at The University of Manchester hosted the Conference in 2005. The conference included the first public speech by the new Secretary of State for Education and Skills, Ruth Kelly, appointed just three weeks earlier following Charles Clarke's promotion to Home Secretary. The theme was 'Leading Together' and the aim, to demonstrate how schools, Higher Education and Local Authorities could collaborate to develop leadership potential and to lead education improvement. Speakers included Benjamin Zander, Conductor of the Boston Philharmonic and Dr Peter Senge, author of 'The Fifth Discipline: The Art and Practice of The Learning Organisation'.

=== 2006 Gateshead and Newcastle Councils ===
The 2006 North of England Education Conference was held in Gateshead and consisted of three days of speakers, workshops and receptions. Speakers included Jane Davidson AM, the Minister for Education and Lifelong Learning, Ruth Kelly MP, the Secretary of State for Education, Professor Al Aynsley-Green, the Children’s Commissioner for England and Dr Michael Fullan, the former dean of the Ontario Institute for Studies for Education. There was also a formal civic reception and a gala ninner.

=== 2007 Lancashire County Council ===
The Conference took place 3–5 January 2007 at the Guildhall, Preston in Lancashire with the theme of 'Investing for Achievement'. Jonathan Jansen, University of Pretoria, South Africa; Jude Kelly, Artistic Director, South Bank Centre and Leader of the 2012 Olympics Education and Culture Programme; Juan Manuel Moreno, Senior Education Specialist, The World Bank. The ministerial Address was given by Jim Knight MP, Minister of State for Schools and 14 - 19 Learners

=== 2008 The Welsh Assembly and Welsh LGA ===
In January 2008 the NEEC once again left the North West and was held in the Wales Millennium Centre in Cardiff Bay, with workshops being hosted in various locations across the city and beyond.

The programme include presentations from Professor John Field from the University of Stirling and Professor David Hopkins from the Institute of Education at London University. In addition there were speeches from the journalist Fiona Millar and the former General Secretary of the Transport and General Workers Union, Bill Morris, Baron Morris of Handsworth. A civic reception was held in the Senedd Building; the home of the National Assembly hosted by the First Minister Rhodri Morgan AM.

=== 2009 Wirral CC and Chester City Council ===
The theme for the conference held in Wirral and Chester was 'Growing People – Growing Minds'. The conference was notable in its embracing the wider children’s workforce in the programme. The conference president was Baroness Estelle Morris and speakers included Peter Fahy, chief constable Greater Manchester, Liz Railton, Professor Sir David Watson, Dame Gillian Pugh, and with the new broader emphasis Dr David Colin Thomé giving a GPs perspective. The conference included the traditional political spot with input from David Willetts MP and Secretary of State Ed Balls who attended following a Cabinet Meeting in Liverpool. All schools in Wirral were involved in a 'Performance Extravaganza' held throughout Weather Head High School Media College.

=== 2010 City of York Council ===
The theme for York's conference was 'Unlocking Children’s Potential' and had Sir Michael Bichard as conference president. Speakers included Sir Roger Singleton, Sir John Sorrell, Sir Andrew Motion, Dylan Wiliam and Beeban Kidron, British Television and Film Director. The political slot was filled by Vernon Coaker, Michael Gove and David Laws. An input by York’s Member of the UK Youth Parliament was well received by delegates. Delegates attended a civic reception at York Minster with a performance by a large children’s choir. The gala dinner made innovative use of the National Railway Museum. The conference in York went ahead successfully despite falling during a period of heavy snow which caused transport problems nationally for a number of days.

=== 2011 Blackpool Council ===
The theme for Blackpool’s conference theme was 'Our World, Our Future'. The conference continued the development of previous events in opening the theme out to include aspects of the wider Children’s Services agenda.

The conference presidency was shared between Ann Widdecombe and a young person from the town. Conference speakers included Nick Gibb MP, Andy Burnham MP, Martin Bell, Baroness Estelle Morris, Dr Margaret Atkinson, Sir Paul Ennals, Steve Munby, Sharon Shoesmith, Sir Ian Kennedy, Saul Nasse, Professor Barry Carpenter, Sir Charles Pollard and Tanni Grey-Thompson. The conference took place between the neighbouring hotels Blackpool Hilton and The Imperial. The Gala Dinner was hosted in the Blackpool Tower Ballroom and featured dancing, circus skills and a performance on the world-famous Wurlitzer.

=== 2012 Leeds City Council ===
Leeds City Council hosted the NEEC from 4–6 January 2012 under the title of, "Passion, Potential, Performance". Mick Waters, former Director of Curriculum at the Qualifications and Curriculum Authority was the conference president. The venue for the event was the Royal Armouries Museum.

=== 2013 Sheffield ===
The theme for Sheffield’s Conference was Mind, Brain, Community, Inspiring: Learners, Strengthening Resilience. The Conference was hosted by Sheffield City Council, the University of Sheffield and Sheffield Hallam University. David Blunkett MP was the president. Conference speakers included: Dr. Isaac Prilleltensky, Professor Steven P R Rose, Professor Philip Davis, Marlo Winstead, Baroness Campbell, Professor Kenneth Gergen, Professor Barry Carpenter, Sir Michael Wilshaw HMCI, Liz Truss MP, Lord Robert Winston, Dr Steven Edwards, Jean Gross Professor Tanya Byron, Camila Batmanghelidjh, Matthew Syed, Lord Baker of Dorking and Charlie Taylor,

The Gala Event, 'An Evening of Conversation' was held in the Millennium Galleries & Winter Gardens, providing an opportunity for delegates to continue their conversations with the conference contributors, and included food and entertainment. The conference took place at Sheffield Hallam University.

=== NEEC 2014 Nottingham City Council ===
Nottingham City Council hosted the 2014 NEEC. It took place from 15–17 January 2014 at Nottingham Conference Centre. The 2014 conference was entitled 'Education: Innovation, Creativity, Employability'.

Speakers included David Puttnam, Charles Leadbeater, David Laws MP, Tristram Hunt MP, Matthew Hancock MP, Sir Michael Wilshaw and Children's Commissioner for England, Dr Maggie Atkinson.
