= Maidstone and The Weald =

UK Parliament constituency (1997–2024)

Coordinates: 51°12′N 0°33′E

- Former county constituency for the House of Commons
- Boundary of Maidstone and The Weald in Kent

- Location of Kent within England
- County: Kent
- Electorate: 70,576 (December 2010)
- Major settlements: Maidstone, Staplehurst and Cranbrook

1997–2024
- Seats: One
- Created from: Maidstone, Mid Kent, Tunbridge Wells
- Replaced by: Maidstone and Malling, Weald of Kent

Maidstone and The Weald was a constituency in Kent represented in the House of Commons of the UK Parliament. From the 2010 general election it was represented by Helen Grant of the Conservative Party. She succeeded fellow party member Ann Widdecombe, who had held the seat since it was created for the 1997 general election.

The seat was abolished in the 2023 Periodic Review of Westminster constituencies. Its southern, rural areas ("The Weald") were transferred to the newly created constituency of Weald of Kent, and parts of the Borough of Tonbridge and Malling, including the town of West Malling, were added to form the new constituency of Maidstone and Malling. Both were first contested in the 2024 general election.

== Boundaries ==
1997–2010: The Borough of Maidstone wards of Allington, Barming, Boughton Monchelsea, Bridge, Coxheath, East, Farleigh, Heath, High Street, Loose, Marden, North, South, Staplehurst, Yalding; and the Borough of Tunbridge Wells wards of Benenden, Cranbrook, Frittenden and Sissinghurst, Hawkhurst, Sandhurst.

Map of boundaries 2010–2024

2010–2024: The Borough of Maidstone wards of Allington, Barming, Bridge, Coxheath and Hunton, East, Fant, Heath, High Street, Loose, Marden and Yalding, North, South, Staplehurst; and the Borough of Tunbridge Wells wards of Benenden and Cranbrook, Frittenden and Sissinghurst.

The largest settlement was the central county town of Maidstone in Kent in southeast England, with smaller settlements spread throughout agriculture-rich Maidstone borough and partly wooded Tunbridge Wells borough.

== History ==
The constituency was created for the 1997 general election, after the previous Maidstone constituency was split in two: its southeast wards of Shepway and Park Wood of the town itself and the rural wards east of the town joined Faversham in the new Faversham and Mid Kent constituency. The remaining two-thirds of the electorate in west-central Maidstone were reunited with the town wards that had been lost in 1983 to Mid Kent (which was abolished), as well as joined by a rural part of the Weald to the south of the town, previously in the Tunbridge Wells constituency.

History of members

The Member of Parliament (MP) for the seat from its creation in 1997 was Ann Widdecombe of the Conservative Party. Widdecombe was the MP for the former seat of Maidstone (1987–1997); she served as a Home Office Minister of State in the government of John Major from 1995 to 1997 and later as Shadow Home Secretary from 1999 to 2001. She stood down at the 2010 general election and was succeeded by Helen Grant, also a member of the Conservative Party.

== Constituency profile ==
Most of the electorate lived in urban Maidstone, which has some light industry but whose economy is increasingly dominated by the service sector (including care, hospitality and insurance). The south of the constituency is rural with significant orchards and market gardens. Many residents commute daily to London. To summarise this is an urban-rural seat in a prosperous part of Kent.

== Members of Parliament ==
Election	Member	Party
1997	Ann Widdecombe	Conservative
2010	Helen Grant	Conservative

== Elections ==
=== Elections in the 2010s ===
General election 2019: Maidstone and The Weald
Party	Candidate	Votes	%	±%
Conservative	Helen Grant	31,220	60.4	+4.0
Labour	Dan Wilkinson	9,448	18.3	−3.8
Liberal Democrats	James Willis	8,482	16.4	0.0
Green	Stuart Jeffery	2,172	4.2	+2.5
Independent	Yolande Kenward	358	0.7	+0.4
Majority		21,772	42.1	+7.8
Turnout		51,680	67.9	−0.7
Conservative hold		Swing	+3.9	

General election 2017: Maidstone and The Weald
Party	Candidate	Votes	%	±%
Conservative	Helen Grant	29,156	56.4	+10.9
Labour	Allen Simpson	11,433	22.1	+11.6
Liberal Democrats	Emily Fermor	8,455	16.4	−7.7
UKIP	Pamela Watts	1,613	3.1	−12.8
Green	Stuart Jeffery	888	1.7	−1.1
Independent	Yolande Kenward	172	0.3	New
Majority		17,704	34.3	+12.9
Turnout		51,717	68.6	+0.3
Conservative hold		Swing	-0.4	

General election 2015: Maidstone and The Weald
Party	Candidate	Votes	%	±%
Conservative	Helen Grant	22,745	45.5	−2.5
Liberal Democrats	Jasper Gerard	12,036	24.1	−11.9
UKIP	Eddie Powell	7,930	15.9	+12.6
Labour	Allen Simpson	5,268	10.5	+0.8
Green	Hannah Patton	1,396	2.8	+1.5
NHA	Paul Hobday	583	1.2	New
Independent	Robin Kinrade	52	0.1	New
Majority		10,709	21.4	+9.4
Turnout		50,010	68.3	−0.6
Conservative hold		Swing	+4.5	

General election 2010: Maidstone and The Weald
Party	Candidate	Votes	%	±%
Conservative	Helen Grant	23,491	48.0	−3.8
Liberal Democrats	Peter Carroll	17,602	36.0	+13.8
Labour	Rav Seeruthun	4,769	9.7	−12.6
UKIP	Gareth A. Kendal	1,637	3.3	+0.3
Green	Stuart R. Jeffery	655	1.3	+0.4
National Front	Gary Butler	643	1.3	New
Christian	Heidi A. Simmonds	131	0.3	New
Majority		5,889	12.0	−18.5
Turnout		48,928	68.9	+3.1
Conservative hold		Swing	−8.5	

=== Elections in the 2000s ===
General election 2005: Maidstone and The Weald
Party	Candidate	Votes	%	±%
Conservative	Ann Widdecombe	25,670	52.7	+3.1
Labour	Elizabeth Breeze	10,814	22.2	−4.8
Liberal Democrats	Mark Corney	10,808	22.2	+2.3
UKIP	Anthony 'Felix' Robertson	1,463	3.0	+0.9
Majority		14,856	30.5	+7.9
Turnout		48,755	65.8	+4.2
Conservative hold		Swing	+3.9	

General election 2001: Maidstone and The Weald
Party	Candidate	Votes	%	±%
Conservative	Ann Widdecombe	22,621	49.6	+5.5
Labour	Mark Davis	12,303	27.0	+0.8
Liberal Democrats	Allison Wainman	9,064	19.9	−2.5
UKIP	John Botting	978	2.1	+1.5
Independent	Neil Hunt	611	1.3	New
Majority		10,318	22.6	+4.7
Turnout		45,577	61.6	−12.1
Conservative hold		Swing		

=== Elections in the 1990s ===
General election 1997: Maidstone and the Weald
Party	Candidate	Votes	%	±%
Conservative	Ann Widdecombe	23,657	44.1	
Labour	John Morgan	14,054	26.2	
Liberal Democrats	Jane Nelson	11,986	22.4	
Referendum	Sarah Hopkins	1,998	3.7	
Socialist Labour	Maureen Cleator	979	1.8	
Green	Penelope Kemp	480	0.9	
UKIP	Ruth Owens	339	0.6	
Natural Law	John Oldbury	115	0.2	
Majority		9,603	17.9	
Turnout		53,608	73.7	
Conservative win (new seat)				

== See also ==
- List of parliamentary constituencies in Kent

== Sources ==
- T. H. B. Oldfield, The Representative History of Great Britain and Ireland (London: Baldwin, Cradock & Joy, 1816)
- Robert Waller, The Almanac of British Politics (1st edition, London: Croom Helm, 1983; 5th edition, London: Routledge, 1996)
- Frederic A Youngs, jr, "Guide to the Local Administrative Units of England, Vol I" (London: Royal Historical Society, 1979)
