= Rain scald =

Bacterial skin disease primarily affecting cattle and horses

Rain scald or rain rot (also known as dermatophilosis, tufailosis, or streptothricosis) is a dermatological disease primarily affecting cattle and horses. Once in the skin, the bacterium Dermatophilus congolensis causes inflammation of the skin as well as the appearance of scabs and lesions.

Infections in humans are rare, but the European Centre for Disease Prevention and Control published an update in August 2026 noting clusters of over 100 cases across 10 European countries, primarily among men who have sex with men; as of 17 June 2026, the ECDC considered the overalls risk level for humans across the EU and EEA to be "very low", but "low" for 2 categories of men who have sex with men.

== Symptoms and signs ==
There are two different manifestations of rain scald: the winter form, which is more severe due to the longer coat of the horse, and the summer form, which is less severe. Horses are usually affected on the back, head, and neck where insects commonly bite, and the legs, which are commonly infected if the horse is kept in moist footing. Initially, the horse will display a matted coat and bumps which will progress to crusty scabs and lesions. The animal may also be pruritic and display signs of discomfort.

In humans, dermatophilosis typically presents as a mild, localised cutaneous disease with symptoms including "papular, pustular or scaly, pruritic skin lesions", or "folliculitis-like eruptions", "mainly in the genital and facial area, without systemic symptoms", with lesion patterns mirroring those observed in sexually transmitted dermatophytosis. For cases identified among contact sport practitioners, symptoms were mainly mild occurrences of pustular lesions on the face, arms and torso.

== Causes ==
D. congolensis is a Gram-positive bacterium that is thought to originate from the soil. It commonly causes disease in moist tropical areas, but can also be found in wet northern environments. Moisture and high temperatures facilitate the dispersal and penetration of zoospores into the skin, contributing to the spread of the disease.

== Diagnosis ==
Diagnosis is most commonly done with the identification of bacteria in the lesions by microscopic evaluation. A positive diagnosis of rain scald can be confirmed if filamentous bacteria are observed, as well as chains of small, spherical bacteria (cocci). If a diagnosis cannot be confirmed with a microscope, blood agar cultures can be grown to confirm the presence of D. congolensis. The resulting colonies have filaments and are yellow in colour.

Human diagnostic confirmation likewise relies on lab testing of lesion samples — through microscopy, culture or molecular methods, however ECDC reported that "Maldi-TOF may give inconclusive or low-confidence results" and that ribosomal 16S sequencing and whole-genome sequencing may be needed for species confirmation and comparison of isolates". In an August 2026 BMJ report, the UK Health Security Agency recommended that "healthcare professionals should be aware of the possibility of Dermatophilosis in GBMSM who present with compatible symptoms", reiterating advice from ECDC that awareness be raised "among clinicians, sexual health services and laboritories to support timely recognition, testing and reporting of campatible skin infections".

== Prevention ==
In addition to wet conditions, exposure to ticks, biting flies, and contact with other infected animals can also cause the spread of rain scald. Tick and insect control is an effective way to stop the spread of the bacteria from one animal to another. Separating infected animals will help to isolate bacterial colonies. Keeping the animal in a dry, well-ventilated area out of the rain and wet conditions will stop the bacteria from growing.

ECDC reported that there is limited evidence on environmental control of D. congolensis in human settings but recommended the use of "established hygiene practices in shared venues", including routine cleaning and disinfection of surfaces "particularly in humid areas" for sex on premises venues, notable in the 2026 European clusters' etiology, and that "measures to reduce moisture accumulation ... may also be effective". Recommendations did not include strict isolation, but avoiding close contact with pets and livestock is recommended for people with skin lesions; close contacts should self-monitor for skin lesions for 14 days. ECDC recommended targetted risk communication and prevention advice for gay, bisexual and other men who have sex with men, and for operators of sex on premises venues.

== Treatment ==
Rain scald normally heals on its own; however, the condition can spread, so prompt treatment is recommended. Although some cases can be severe, most rain scald is minor and can be treated at home naturally. Typically the condition is not life-threatening, nor does it impact the welfare of the horse, so treatments are more for the owner's peace of mind and cosmetic appeal of the animal. Human cases typically see complete recovery following oral or topical antibiotic treatment, and with occasional self-limiting resolution; European clusters in 2026 described successful treatment with topical fusidic acid, antiseptic washes, doxycycline or amoxicillin.

== Human epidemiology ==
Human infections have only been reported sporadically and have typically been associated with contact with infected animals. However, ECDC reported in mid-2026 that "several clusters of genetically and epidemiologically linked cases predominantly affecting gay, bisexual and other men who have sex with men" had been seen in 4 EU countries in the first half of 2026 and that "cases have also been reported in Norway among individuals practicing martial arts, in 2025 and 2026". ECDC posited that "this indicates a possible shift in transmission dynamics, with human-to-human transmission through close physical contact being the most likely route", noting the epidemiological links and genomic relatedness between isolates. As of 17 June 2026, it is thought "the probability of D. congolensis infection among gay, bisexual and other men who have sex with men who have multiple sexual partners and attend sex-in-premises venues is assessed as moderate with a very low impact", justifying ECDC's overall risk level of "low" in this community.
