= Dermatophilaceae =

Scientific classification
- Domain: Bacteria
- Kingdom: Bacillati
- Phylum: Actinomycetota
- Class: Actinomycetes
- Order: Micrococcales
- Family: Dermatophilaceae; Austwick 1958

Type genus
- Dermatophilus (Van Saceghem 1915) Gordon 1964 (Approved Lists 1980)

Genera
- Agilicoccus Yin et al. 2021; Arsenicicoccus Collins et al. 2004; Austwickia Hamada et al. 2011; Dermatophilus (Van Saceghem 1915) Gordon 1964 (Approved Lists 1980); Kineosphaera Liu et al. 2002; Mobilicoccus Hamada et al. 2011; Piscicoccus Hamada et al. 2011; Tonsilliphilus Azuma et al. 2013

Synonyms
- Arsenicicoccaceae Salam et al. 2020

Family of bacteria

The Dermatophilaceae is a Gram-positive family of bacteria placed within the order of Actinomycetales. Dermatophilaceae bacteria occur on animal and human skin and in fish guts.

== Phylogeny ==
The currently accepted taxonomy is based on the List of Prokaryotic names with Standing in Nomenclature and the phylogeny is based on whole-genome sequences. (Note: Tonsilliphilus is not included in this phylogenetic tree.)

- - Dermatophilaceae
    - Arsenicicoccus
    - - Austwickia
      - - Dermatophilus
        - - Mobilicoccus
          - - Kineosphaera
            - Piscicoccus
  - outgroups
    - Dermacoccaceae
    - Intrasporangiaceae
