= Blair Babes =

1997 slang term for female Labour MPs

Blair Babes or Blair's Babes was a term sometimes used to refer to the 101 female Members of Parliament (MPs) from the Labour Party elected to the House of Commons in Labour's landslide 1997 general election victory, after images of the new prime minister, Tony Blair, with 96 of them on the steps of Church House in Westminster were widely publicised. The photographs have been called "infamous". The phrase is attributed to the Daily Mail. The term was criticised as trivialising women in politics, and the group of women MPs to which it referred have been studied as a group.

== Background ==
The 1997 general election saw more women elected to the House of Commons than ever – 120, exactly double the 60 elected at the 1992 general election. Aside from the 101 Labour MPs, there were also 13 Conservatives, three Liberal Democrats, and three from other parties (including Speaker Betty Boothroyd, previously a Labour politician). However, many of the new female MPs grew disillusioned, and nine either chose not to stand or lost their seats in the 2001 general election. Despite two female MPs winning by-elections between 1997 and 2001, and other women being elected, the total number of female MPs fell to 118 at the 2001 general election. A further 22 stood down or lost their seats at the 2005 general election, although the number of female MPs increased again to a new record of 127.

== Perception ==
According to The Times, Margaret Moran, MP for Luton South, described the "perception that the 1997 intake of female Labour MPs are all robotic clones" as "complete tosh". Moran said that she herself was not a Blair Babe, but a "Blair Witch". The columnist Polly Toynbee condemned the term as a "casual, misogynist tag."

== Implications of the term ==
The sociological implications of the term and the experiences of Labour's women MPs were extensively analysed by Sarah Childs in her 2004 book New Labour's Women MPs: Women Representing Women. It has been identified as a trivialising way to refer to women in politics, similar to Cameron Cutie. Tony Blair's wife Cherie Blair did not like the term. Margaret Moran said it should not be used. The term has also been used within Parliament to stigmatise some women MPs, separating "young attractive" Blair's Babes from "brainy babe[s]".

Some of the group believe that the term was harmful to their ability to bring about change, and that it encouraged a focus on their appearance. It has been reported that the Daily Mail used the term "to challenge Labour's claim that having 101 women MPs would make a difference".

== Experiences of Blair's Babes as a group ==
This group of women MPs has sometimes been used as a way to examine women MPs' experiences in Parliament, as in a Guardian article by Rachel Cooke in 2007. Cooke's interviews of ten of the women found that some of them had experienced bullying, sexism and cliques in Parliament, as well as working hours that conflicted with family life. They have also been the subject of "where are they now?" articles.

The journalist Lucy Ward has written of the group,

The story of the so-called "Blair Babes" ... is a unique tale of soaring expectations, disappointed dreams and indignant rebuttals, with a few political casualties thrown in along the way. It reveals much about the party which, at first, set so much store by women's election, and about the image-obsessed government Britain elected.

As of the 2024 general election, there are five Blair Babes left in the House of Commons, out of a total of 263 female MPs.

The 5 MPs left as of 2024

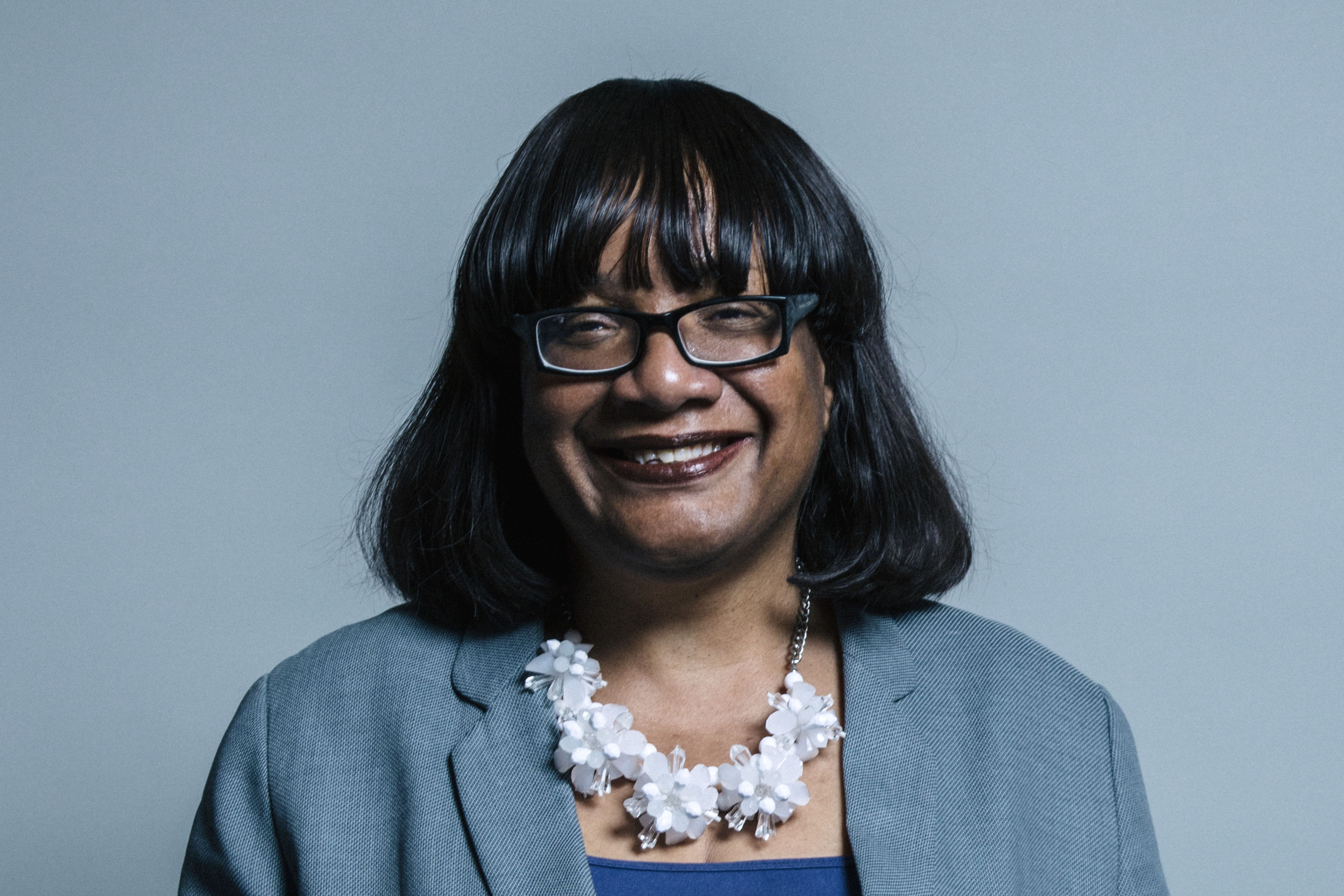
Diane Abbott (Hackney North and Stoke Newington since 1987)

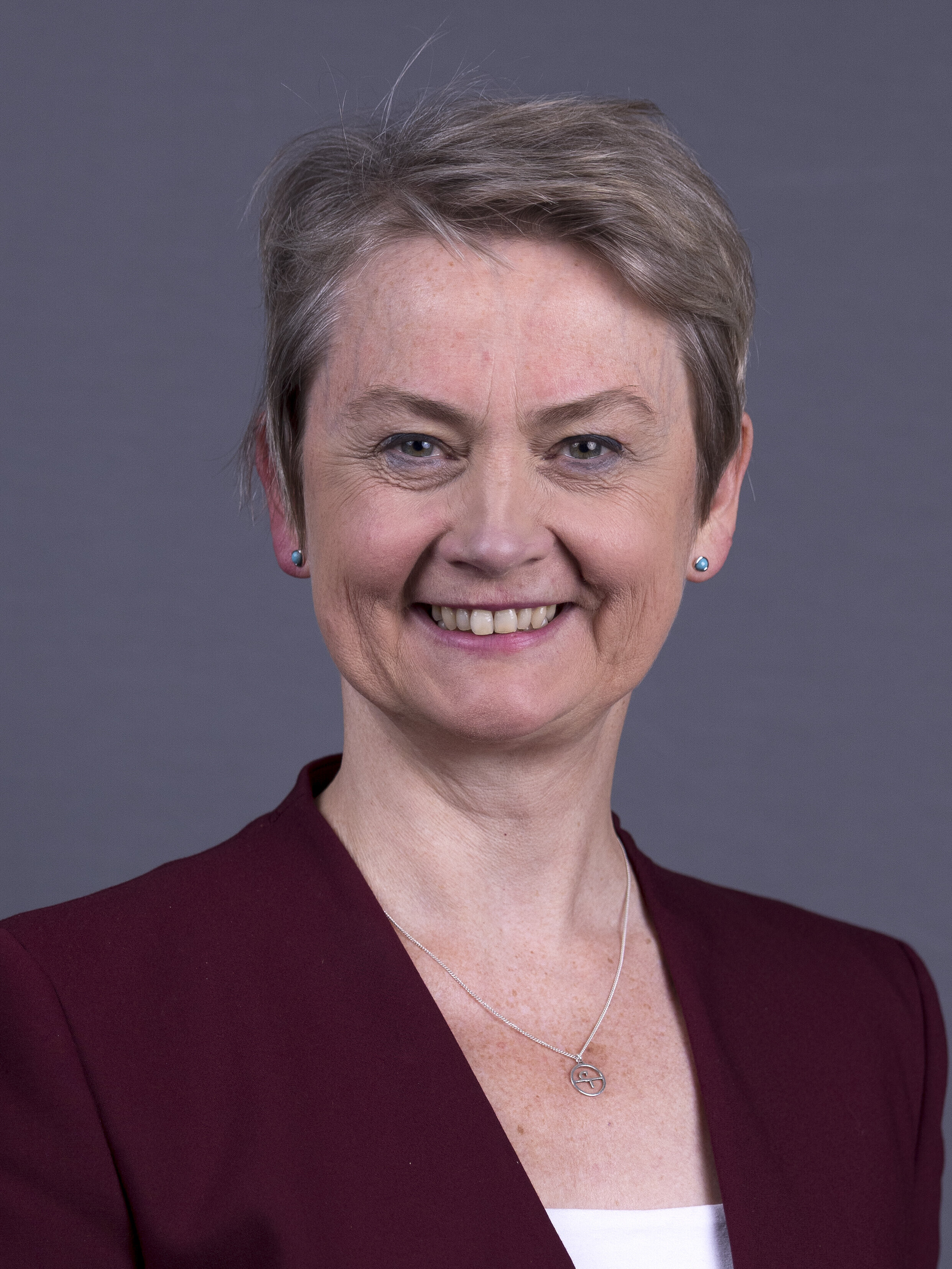
Yvette Cooper (Pontefract, Castleford and Knottingley since 1997)

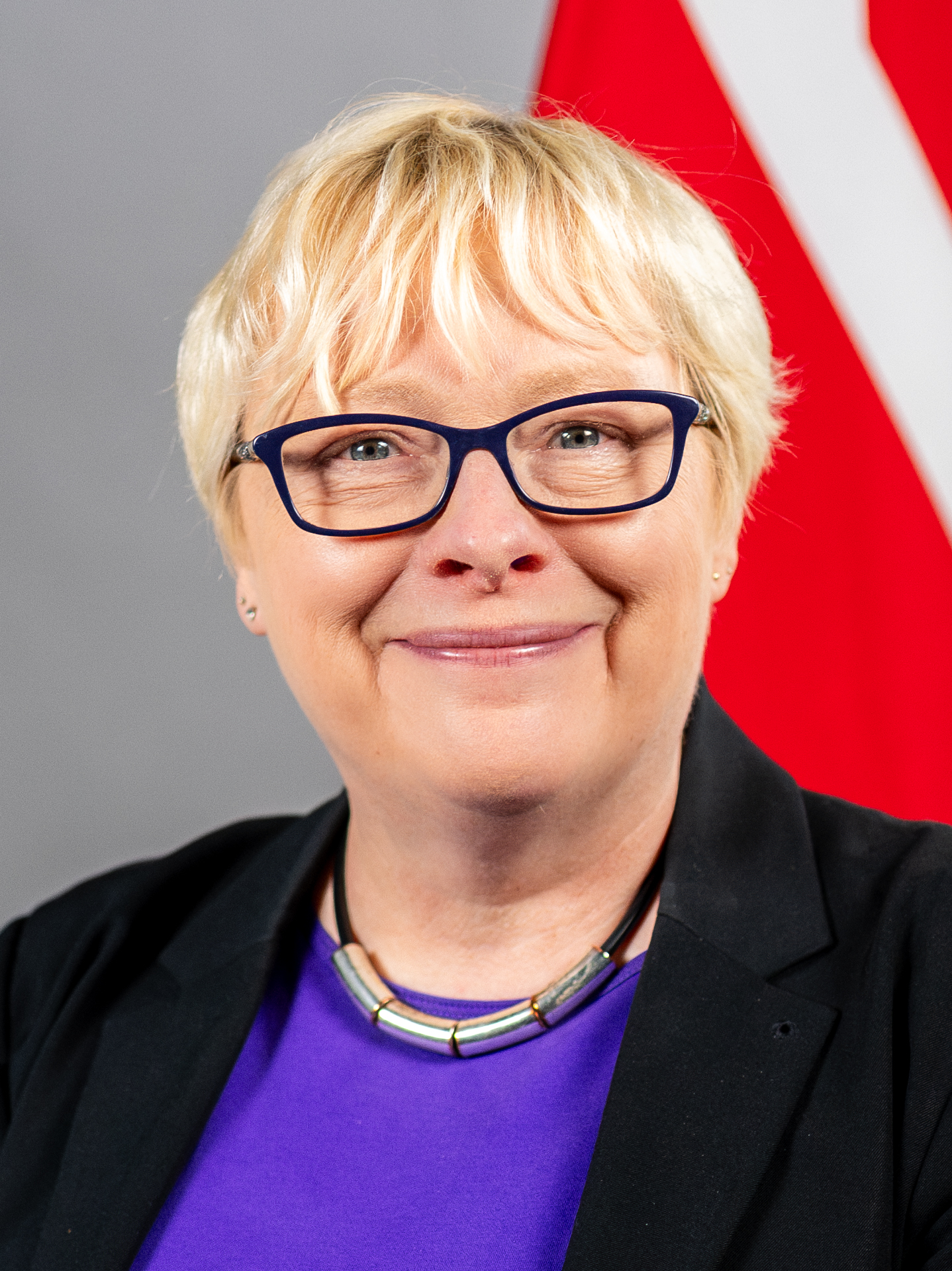
Angela Eagle (Wallasey since 1992)

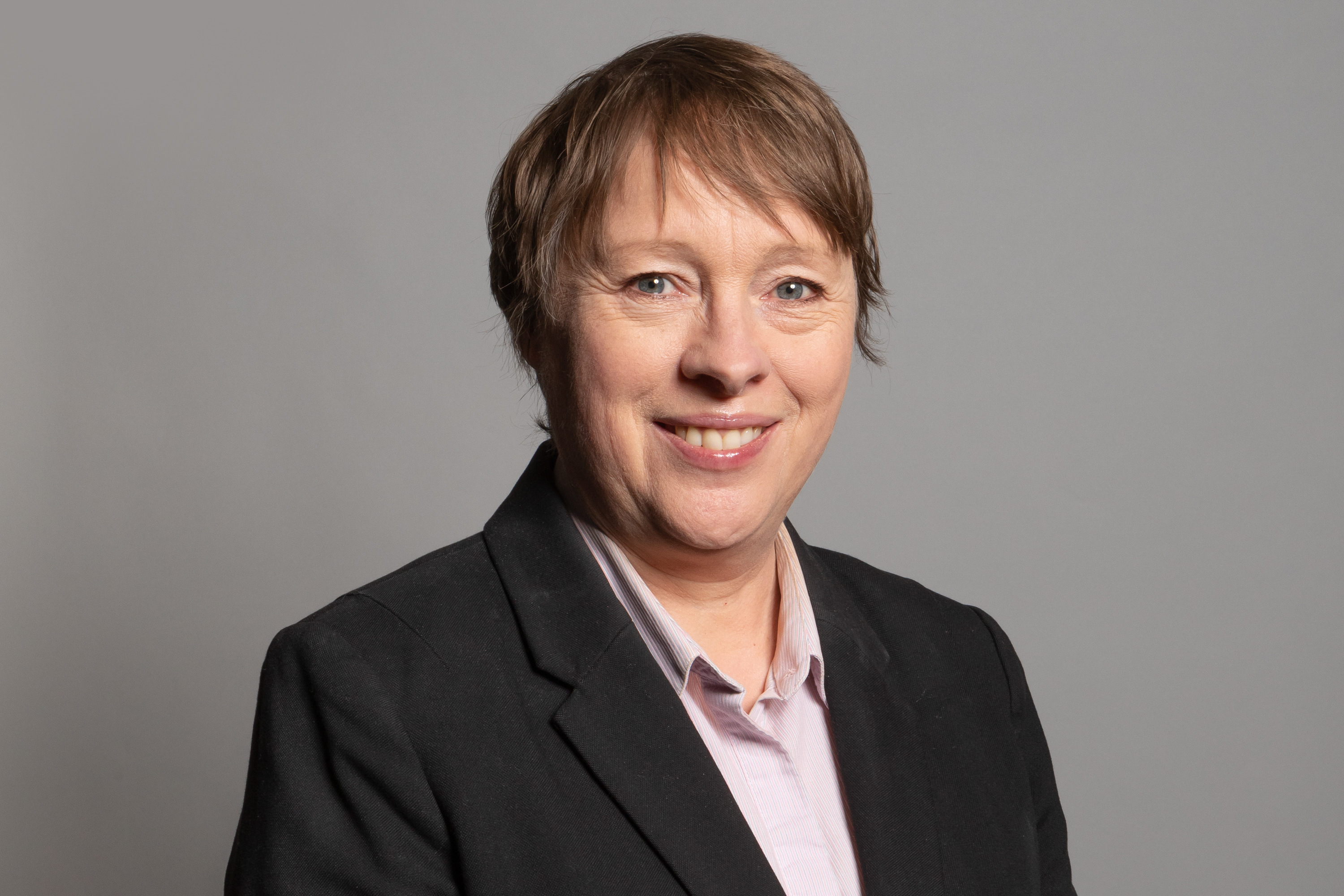
Maria Eagle (Liverpool Garston since 1997)

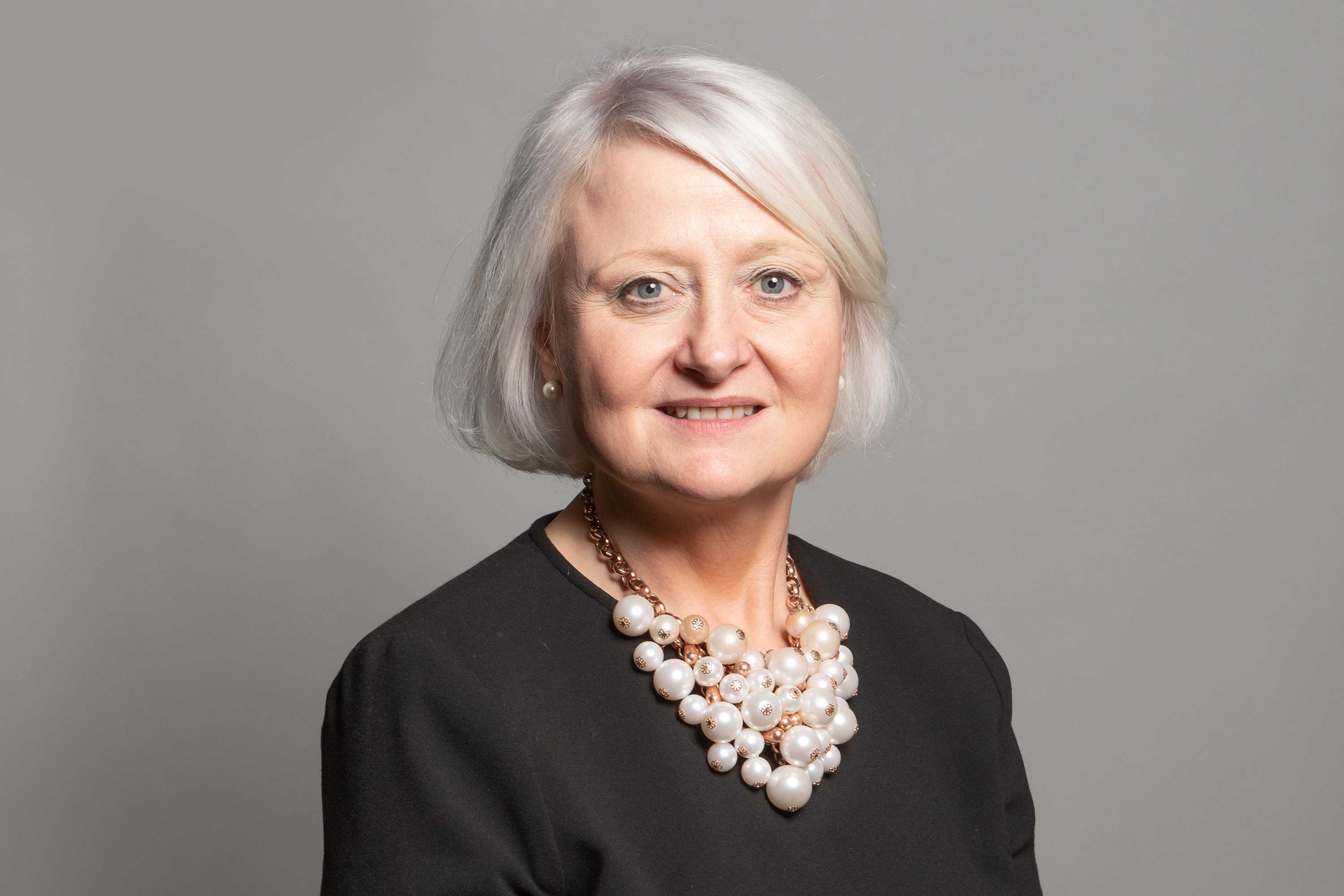
Siobhain McDonagh (Mitcham and Morden since 1997)

== List ==
Name	Constituency	In office		Notes
Name	Constituency	From	To	Notes
Diane Abbott	Hackney North and Stoke Newington	1987	Incumbent	In 2023, lost the Labour whip and sat as an Independent MP. Regained the whip in 2024, but suspended again in 2025.
Irene Adams	Paisley North	1990	2005	Retired. Ennobled as Baroness Adams of Craigielea in 2005.
Janet Anderson	Rossendale and Darwen	1992	2010	Served as a government whip in 1997 and then under-secretary in the Department for Culture, Media and Sport. Reshuffled after the 2001 election. Lost seat to Conservative Jake Berry. Died in 2023.
Hilary Armstrong	North West Durham	1987	2010	Served as Government Chief Whip of the House of Commons and Parliamentary Secretary to the Treasury from 2001 to 2006 then Minister for the Cabinet Office, Chancellor of the Duchy of Lancaster and Minister for Social Exclusion from 2006 to 2007. Retired in 2010, subsequently ennobled as Baroness Armstrong of Hill Top.
Candy Atherton	Falmouth and Camborne	1997	2005	Lost seat to Liberal Democrat Julia Goldsworthy. Died in 2017.
Charlotte Atkins	Staffordshire Moorlands	1997	2010	Lost seat to Conservative Karen Bradley.
Margaret Beckett	Derby South	1983	2024	Previously MP for Lincoln (1974–79). Retired. Ennobled as Baroness Beckett in 2024.
Anne Begg	Aberdeen South	1997	2015	Lost seat to SNP's Callum McCaig.
Liz Blackman	Erewash	1997	2010	Retired.
Hazel Blears	Salford / Salford and Eccles	1997	2015	Retired.
Helen Clark (née Brinton)	Peterborough	1997	2005	Lost seat to Conservative Stewart Jackson.
Karen Buck	Regent's Park and Kensington North / Westminster North (2010-24)	1997	2024	Retired.
Christine Butler	Castle Point	1997	2001	Lost seat to Conservative Bob Spink. Died in 2017.
Anne Campbell	Cambridge	1992	2005	Lost seat to Liberal Democrat David Howarth.
Judith Church	Dagenham	1994	2001	Retired.
Lynda Clark	Edinburgh Pentlands	1997	2005	Retired. Ennobled as Baroness Clark of Calton in 2005.
Ann Clwyd	Cynon Valley	1984	2019	Retired in 2019 and died in 2023.
Ann Coffey	Stockport	1992	2019	Resigned from the Labour Party and joined Change UK. Retired.
Yvette Cooper	Pontefract and Castleford / Normanton, Pontefract and Castleford / Pontefract, Castleford and Knottingley	1997	Incumbent	
Jean Corston	Bristol East	1992	2005	Retired. Ennobled as Baroness Corston in 2005.
Ann Cryer	Keighley	1997	2010	Retired.
Claire Curtis-Thomas	Crosby	1997	2010	Retired.
Valerie Davey	Bristol West	1997	2005	Lost seat to Liberal Democrat Stephen Williams.
Janet Dean	Burton	1997	2010	Retired
Julia Drown	South Swindon	1997	2005	Retired.
Gwyneth Dunwoody	Crewe / Crewe and Nantwich	1974	2008	Previously MP for Exeter (1966–70). Died in office.
Angela Eagle	Wallasey	1992	Incumbent	
Maria Eagle	Liverpool Garston / Garston and Halewood	1997	Incumbent	
Louise Ellman	Liverpool Riverside	1997	2019	Resigned from the Labour Party and retired.
Lorna Fitzsimons	Rochdale	1997	2005	Lost seat to Liberal Democrat Paul Rowen.
Caroline Flint	Don Valley	1997	2019	Lost seat to Conservative Nick Fletcher.
Barbara Follett	Stevenage	1997	2010	Retired.
Maria Fyfe	Glasgow Maryhill	1987	2001	Retired. Died in 2020.
Linda Gilroy	Plymouth Sutton	1997	2010	Lost seat to Conservative Oliver Colvile.
Llin Golding	Newcastle-under-Lyme	1986	2001	Retired. Ennobled in 2001 as Baroness Golding.
Eileen Gordon	Romford	1997	2001	Lost seat to Conservative Andrew Rosindell.
Jane Griffiths	Reading East	1997	2005	Deselected.
Harriet Harman	Camberwell and Peckham	1982	2024	Retired.
Sylvia Heal	Halesowen and Rowley Regis	1997	2010	Previously MP for Mid Staffordshire (1990–92). Retired.
Patricia Hewitt	Leicester West	1997	2010	Retired.
Margaret Hodge	Barking	1994	2024	Retired. Ennobled as Baroness Hodge of Barking in 2024.
Kate Hoey	Vauxhall	1989	2019	Retired. Ennobled as Baroness Hoey in 2020.
Beverley Hughes	Stretford and Urmston	1997	2010	Retired. Ennobled as Baroness Hughes of Stretford in 2010.
Joan Humble	Blackpool North and Fleetwood	1997	2010	Retired.
Glenda Jackson	Hampstead and Highgate	1992	2015	Retired. Died in 2023.
Helen Jackson	Sheffield Hillsborough	1992	2005	Retired.
Melanie Johnson	Welwyn Hatfield	1997	2005	Lost seat to Conservative Grant Shapps.
Fiona Jones	Newark	1997	2001	Lost seat to Conservative Patrick Mercer. Died in 2007.
Helen Jones	Warrington North	1997	2019	Retired
Jenny Jones	Wolverhampton South West	1997	2001	Retired.
Lynne Jones	Birmingham Selly Oak	1992	2010	Retired.
Tessa Jowell	Dulwich and West Norwood	1992	2015	Retired. Ennobled as Baroness Jowell in 2015. Died in 2018.
Sally Keeble	Northampton North	1997	2010	Lost seat to Conservative Michael Ellis.
Ann Keen	Brentford and Isleworth	1997	2010	Lost seat to Conservative Mary Macleod.
Ruth Kelly	Bolton West	1997	2010	Retired.
Jane Kennedy	Liverpool Broadgreen / Liverpool, Wavertree	1992	2010	Retired.
Oona King	Bethnal Green and Bow	1997	2005	Lost seat to George Galloway (Respect). Ennobled as Baroness King of Bow in 2011.
Tess Kingham	Gloucester	1997	2001	Retired.
Jackie Lawrence	Preseli Pembrokeshire	1997	2005	Retired.
Helen Liddell	Monklands East / Airdrie and Shotts	1994	2005	Retired. Ennobled as Baroness Liddell of Coatdyke in 2005.
Fiona Mactaggart	Slough	1997	2017	Retired.
Alice Mahon	Halifax	1987	2005	Retired. Died in 2022.
Judy Mallaber	Amber Valley	1997	2010	Lost seat to Conservative Nigel Mills.
Christine McCafferty	Calder Valley	1997	2010	Retired.
Siobhain McDonagh	Mitcham and Morden	1997	Incumbent	
Anne McGuire	Stirling	1997	2015	Retired.
Shona McIsaac	Cleethorpes	1997	2010	Lost seat to Conservative Martin Vickers.
Rosemary McKenna	Cumbernauld and Kilsyth / Cumbernauld, Kilsyth and Kirkintilloch East	1997	2010	Retired.
Gillian Merron	Lincoln	1997	2010	Lost seat to Conservative Karl McCartney. Ennobled as Baroness Merron in 2021.
Laura Moffatt	Crawley	1997	2010	Retired.
Margaret Moran	Luton South	1997	2010	Barred from standing as the Labour candidate.
Julie Morgan	Cardiff North	1997	2010	Lost seat to Conservative Jonathan Evans.
Estelle Morris	Birmingham Yardley	1992	2005	Retired. Ennobled as Baroness Morris of Yardley in 2005.
Kali Mountford	Colne Valley	1997	2010	Retired.
Mo Mowlam	Redcar	1987	2001	Retired. Died in 2005.
Diana Organ	Forest of Dean	1997	2005	Retired.
Sandra Osborne	Ayr / Ayr, Carrick and Cumnock	1997	2015	Lost seat to SNP Corri Wilson.
Linda Perham	Ilford North	1997	2005	Lost seat to Conservative Lee Scott.
Bridget Prentice	Lewisham East	1992	2010	Retired.
Dawn Primarolo	Bristol South	1987	2015	Retired. Ennobled as Baroness Primarolo in 2015.
Joyce Quin	Gateshead East / Gateshead East and Washington West	1987	2005	Retired. Ennobled as Baroness Quin in 2005.
Barbara Roche	Hornsey and Wood Green	1992	2005	Lost seat to Liberal Democrat Lynne Featherstone.
Joan Ruddock	Lewisham Deptford	1987	2015	Retired.
Christine Russell	City of Chester	1997	2010	Lost seat to Conservative Stephen Mosley.
Joan Ryan	Enfield North	1997	2010	Lost seat to Conservative Nick de Bois. Regained seat in 2015. Resigned from the Labour Party and joined Change UK. Retired.
Joan Ryan	Enfield North	2015	2019	Lost seat to Conservative Nick de Bois. Regained seat in 2015. Resigned from the Labour Party and joined Change UK. Retired.
Debra Shipley	Stourbridge	1997	2005	Retired.
Clare Short	Birmingham Ladywood	1983	2010	Resigned from the Labour Party and retired.
Angela Smith	Basildon	1997	2010	Lost seat to Conservative Stephen Metcalfe. Ennobled as Baroness Smith of Basildon in 2010.
Geraldine Smith	Morecambe and Lunesdale	1997	2010	Lost seat to Conservative David Morris.
Jacqui Smith	Redditch	1997	2010	Lost seat to Conservative Karen Lumley. Ennobled as Baroness Smith of Malvern in 2024.
Helen Southworth	Warrington South	1997	2010	Retired.
Rachel Squire	Dunfermline West	1992	2006	Died in office.
Phyllis Starkey	Milton Keynes	1997	2010	Lost seat to Conservative Iain Stewart.
Gisela Stuart	Birmingham Edgbaston	1997	2017	Retired. Ennobled as Baroness Stuart of Edgbaston in 2020.
Ann Taylor	Dewsbury	1987	2005	Previously MP for Bolton West (1974–83). Retired. Ennobled as Baroness Taylor of Bolton in 2005.
Dari Taylor	Stockton South	1997	2010	Lost seat to Conservative James Wharton.
Joan Walley	Stoke-on-Trent North	1987	2015	Retired.
Claire Ward	Watford	1997	2010	Lost seat to Conservative Richard Harrington. Elected Mayor of the East Midlands in 2024.
Betty Williams	Conwy	1997	2010	Retired.
Rosie Winterton	Doncaster Central	1997	2024	Became a Deputy Speaker of the House of Commons in 2017. Retired. Ennobled as Baroness Winterton of Doncaster in 2024.
Audrey Wise	Preston	1987	2000	Previously MP for Coventry South West (1974–79). Died in office.

== See also ==
- Tony's Cronies
