= Cameron Cutie =

2010 media term for female Conservative MPs

Cameron Cutie was a political term used in the United Kingdom to refer to female prospective parliamentary candidates and Members of Parliament (MPs) for the 2010 general election from the Conservative Party who were personally supported by then-party leader David Cameron. The term emerged in 2009, and was seen as a Conservative version of the more prominent Blair Babe.

Promoting women candidates was a way of reaching female voters similar to the means by which New Labour won their 1997 landslide. As part of his party's modernisation programme, Cameron advocated for more female MPs. A male equivalent was coined as a "mate of Dave".

Some grassroots activists resented that David Cameron personally selected female parachute candidates for winnable seats. There were female members of the Conservative A-List, priority candidates that were selected for the general election. Mayor of Antrim Adrian Watson said he was overlooked for being the Ulster Conservatives and Unionist candidate in South Antrim for not being a "Cameron cutie".

The term was derided in the media when a number of sex scandals were reported on including some of the candidates. The term was used frequently in the media coverage of the Westminster North Conservative Association selection in 2009 between Joanne Cash and Amanda Sayers, two female lawyers.

== List ==
The following politicians have been described with the label:

Name	Constituency in 2010	Election	Other
Kemi Badenoch	Dulwich and West Norwood	✗ Defeated by Tessa Jowell	Elected in Saffron Walden in the 2017 general election, current Leader of the Conservative Party
Joanne Cash	Westminster North	✗ Defeated by Karen Buck	
Caroline Dinenage	Gosport	✓ Elected - Conservative hold	Minister under Cameron, May and Johnson
Deborah Dunleavy	Bolton North East	✗ Defeated by Sir David Crausby	
Laura Hutchings	The former director of the Conservative Middle East Council		
Keely Huxtable	Birmingham Northfield	✗ Defeated by Richard Burden	
Louise Mensch	Corby	✓ Elected - Defeated Labour MP Phil Hope	Stood down midterm triggering the 2012 Corby by-election
Caroline Nokes	Romsey and Southampton North	✓ Elected - Defeated Lib Dem MP Sandra Gidley	Cabinet minister under Theresa May
Claire Perry O'Neill	Devizes	✓ Elected - Conservative hold	Cabinet minister under Theresa May
Amber Rudd	Hastings and Rye	✓ Elected - Defeated Labour MP Michael Foster	Cabinet minister under David Cameron and Theresa May
Chloe Smith	Norwich North	✓ Elected - Gain from Labour	Elected in the 2009 Norwich North by-election
Liz Truss	South West Norfolk	✓ Elected - Conservative hold	Future prime minister, defeated in the 2024 election.
Sarah Wollaston	Totnes	✓ Elected - Conservative hold	Defected to Change UK and Liberal Democrats in 2019

== Reception ==
The term Cameron Cutie was described as sexist. Rachel Johnson did not like the term. Mark Wallace called it an objectionable term and "an even more patronising version of 'Blair's babes'".

Louise Mensch described herself as a feminist instead of a Cameron Cutie.

Following the 2015 general election, new MP Andrea Jenkyns called herself "feisty Yorkshirewoman" rather than a Cameron Cutie.

In 2022, David Cameron called the usage of the term "embarrassing" in an opinion piece.

== See also ==
- Conservative A-List
- Women in the House of Commons of the United Kingdom
