= Conservative A-List =

Concept in the internal affairs of the British Conservative Party

The Conservative A-List, also called Priority List, was a list of United Kingdom candidates drawn up by Conservative Central Office at the behest of David Cameron following his election as party leader in December 2005, aimed as a means of broadening the number of Conservative Members of Parliament, potential peers and MEPs from minority groups and women as well as other preferred candidates for candidature. Where the preferred forums for selection were held, at least two members from the list were put to every open primary, and where these were not held the A-list were recommended directly, particularly to the top target seats.

Cameron Cutie was a term used for female candidates.

== History ==
In April 2006, a Conservative Party committee on candidates set out to deliver a promise by David Cameron to transform the Conservative party at Westminster. The committee reduced 500 aspiring politicians on the party's list of approved parliamentary candidates to an "A-list" of between 100 and 150 priority candidates. The result was a list on which more than half of the names were of women. The list included the former Coronation Street actor Adam Rickitt, Zac Goldsmith, the author Louise Bagshawe (later Mensch), and Margot James.

Amid controversy, the "A-list" approach was endorsed by Michael Portillo, a Conservative MP until 2005, who in 2006 said that

[based on current membership]...much of the Parliamentary Party is reactionary and unattractive to voters.

Conservative chairmen and activists in seats considered potentially winnable were in the run-up to the 2010 election urged by Conservative Central Office to select candidates from the new A-list and were in many cases included in open primaries, new and preferred open-to-all selection meetings.

The 2010 general election saw failures as well as successes for the "A-listers" selected for 'winnable' seats.

== Listed ==
Those on the A-list included the following: (bold marks people elected to Parliament in 2010. )

- Amar Ahmed, a GP in Cheshire since 2000 and was National Chairman Conservative Policy Forum, Public Sector and Infrastructure, 2011–2015.
- Tariq Ahmad, (Note: PPC Croydon North 2005) life peer in the House of Lords, 2011–present
- Louise Bagshawe (later Mensch), MP for Corby, 2010–2012
- Shaun Bailey, children's worker, PPC for Hammersmith 2010, candidate for Mayor of London, 2021, life peer in the House of Lords, 2023–present
- Harriett Baldwin, (Note: PPC Stockton North 2005) MP for West Worcestershire, 2010–present
- Steve Barclay, (Note: PPC Lancaster and Wyre 2001) MP for North East Cambridgeshire, 2010–present
- Gavin Barwell, MP for Croydon Central, 2010–2017
- James Bethell, (Note: PPC Tooting 2005) a founder of the Ministry of Sound; hereditary peer in the House of Lords, 2018–present
- Nick Boles, (Note: PPC Hove 2005) MP for Grantham and Stamford, 2010–2019
- Karen Bradley, (Note: PPC Manchester Withington 2005) MP for Staffordshire Moorlands, 2010–present
- Angie Bray, (Note: London Assembly Member) MP for Ealing Central and Acton, 2010–2015
- Steve Brine, MP for Winchester, 2010–2024
- Fiona Bruce, (Note: PPC Warrington South 2005) MP for Congleton, 2010–2024
- Dr. David Bull, television presenter, PPC for Brighton Pavilion, 2010; Brexit Party MEP, 2019–2020
- Conor Burns, (Note: PPC Eastleigh 2005) MP for Bournemouth West, 2010–2024
- Georgina Butler, former Ambassador of the United Kingdom to Costa Rica
- Martin Callanan, MEP for North East England, life peer in the House of Lords, 2014–present
- Joanne Cash, barrister, PPC for Westminster North 2010
- Pamela Chesters (Note: Former Camden LB opposition lead councillor. PPC Bristol West 2001) London Assembly Advisor for Health and Youth Opportunities
- Damian Collins, (Note: PPC Northampton North 2005) MP for Folkestone and Hythe, 2010–2024
- Tim Collins, (Note: Westmoreland and Lonsdale MP 1997–2005) former MP
- Charles Crawford, former Ambassador of the United Kingdom to Poland
- Iain Dale, (Note: PPC North Norfolk 2005) blogger
- Caroline Dinenage, (Note: PPC Portsmouth South 2005) MP for Gosport, 2010–present
- Jane Ellison, (Note: PPC Pendle 2005) MP for Battersea, 2010–2017
- Wilfred Emmanuel-Jones, Entrepreneur of the Year — the Black Enterprise Awards 2005, PPC Chippenham 2010
- Howard Flight, former MP, life peer in the House of Lords, 2011–present
- Vicky Ford, MEP for East of England, MP for Chelmsford, 2017–2024
- Jacqueline Foster, MEP for North West England, life peer in the House of Lords, 2021–present
- George Freeman, (Note: PPC Stevenage 2005) MP for Mid Norfolk, 2010–present
- David Gold, (Note: PPC Brighton Pavilion 2001) PPC for Eltham 2010
- Zac Goldsmith, MP for Richmond Park, 2010–2016, 2017–2019, life peer in the House of Lords, 2020–present
- Francois Gordon, former High Commissioner to Uganda
- Helen Grant, MP for Maidstone and The Weald, 2010–2024; MP for Maidstone and Malling, 2024–present
- Andrew Griffiths, (Note: PPC Dudley North 2001; European candidate in 2004) MP for Burton, 2010–2019
- Sam Gyimah, MP for East Surrey, 2010–2019
- Rebecca Harris, (Note: Special Adviser to Tim Yeo) MP for Castle Point, 2010–present
- Chris Heaton-Harris, (Note: East Midlands MEP 1999–2009) MP for Daventry, 2010–2024
- Margot James, (Note: PPC Holborn and Pancras 2005) MP for Stourbridge, 2010–2019
- Syed Kamall, MEP for London, life peer in the House of Lords, 2021–present
- Pauline Latham, (Note: PPC Broxtowe 2001) MP for Mid Derbyshire, 2010–2024
- Andrea Leadsom, (Note: PPC Knowsley South 2005) MP for South Northamptonshire, 2010–2024
- Dr. Phillip Lee, (Note: PPC Blaenau Gwent 2005) MP for Bracknell, 2010–2019
- Brandon Lewis, (Note: Leader of Brentwood Borough Council) MP for Great Yarmouth, 2010–2024
- Group Captain Al Lockwood (Note: PPC Sedgefield 2005)
- Jack Lopresti, (Note: Bristol councillor) MP for Filton and Bradley Stoke, 2010–2024
- Kit Malthouse, (Note: former deputy Leader of Westminster Council) Member of the London Assembly, MP for North West Hampshire 2015–present
- Paul Maynard, (Note: PPC Twickenham 2005) MP for Blackpool North, 2010–2024
- Anne McIntosh, (Note: Vale of York MP 1997–2010) MP for Thirsk and Malton, 2010–2015
- Esther McVey, (Note: PPC Wirral West 2005) MP for Wirral West, 2010–2015 and Tatton, 2017–present
- Mark Menzies, (Note: PPC Selby 2005) MP for Fylde, 2010–2024
- Priti Patel, (Note: PPC Nottingham North 2005) MP for Witham, 2010–present
- Mark Pawsey, (Note: PPC Nuneaton 2005) MP for Rugby, 2010–2024
- Andrew Percy, (Note: PPC Normanton 2005) MP for Brigg and Goole, 2010–2024
- Kulveer Ranger, (Note: PPC Makerfield 2005) Director of Environment, life peer in the House of Lords since 2023
- Annunziata Rees-Mogg, (Note: PPC Aberavon 2005) journalist, PPC for Somerton and Frome, 2010, Brexit Party MEP, 2019–2020
- Adam Rickitt, actor and singer
- Caroline Righton, presenter, PPC for St Austell and Newquay, 2010
- Amber Rudd, MP for Hastings and Rye, 2010–2019
- Laura Sandys, MP for Thanet South, 2010–2015
- Jane Scott, Leader of Wiltshire Council, life peer in the House of Lords, 2015–present
- Anna Soubry, (Note: PPC Gedling 2005) MP for Broxtowe, 2010–2019
- Andrew Stephenson, (Note: Macclesfield councillor) MP for Pendle, 2010–2024
- Mel Stride, MP for Central Devon, 2010–present
- Philippa Stroud, (Note: PPC Birmingham Ladywood 2005) Director of the Centre for Social Justice, life peer in the House of Lords, 2015–present
- Liz Truss, (Note: PPC Calder Valley 2005) MP for South West Norfolk, 2010–2024; Prime Minister of the United Kingdom, September–October 2022
- Sayeeda Warsi, (Note: PPC Dewsbury 2005) life peer in the House of Lords, 2007–present
- Heather Wheeler, (Note: PPC Coventry South 2001 and 2005) MP for South Derbyshire, 2010–2024
- Susan Williams, (Note: Leader of Trafford Council 2004–2009) life peer in the House of Lords, 2013–present
