= John Wheeler (British politician) =

British politician (born 1940)

Sir John Wheeler PC DL JP KStJ

Minister of State for Northern Ireland
- In office 25 June 1993 – 2 May 1997
- Prime Minister: John Major
- Preceded by: Michael Mates
- Succeeded by: Adam Ingram

Chair of the Home Affairs Select Committee
- In office June 1987 – 15 July 1992
- Succeeded by: Ivan Lawrence

Member of Parliament for Westminster North Paddington (1979–1983)
- In office 3 May 1979 – 8 April 1997
- Preceded by: Arthur Latham
- Succeeded by: Karen Buck

Personal details
- Born: 1 May 1940 (age 85)
- Party: Conservative
- Spouse: Laura Langley (m. 1967)
- Children: 2
- Education: Staff College at HM Prison Wakefield

Sir John Daniel Wheeler PC DL JP KStJ (born 1 May 1940) is a British Conservative politician who served as Security Minister in Northern Ireland.

== Early life and career ==
John Wheeler was born on 1 May 1940, the son of the late Frederick Harry Wheeler and Constance Elsie (née Foreman). He was educated at the county school in Suffolk and the Staff College at HM Prison Wakefield.

Wheeler was a constable in West Suffolk Constabulary until 1967. He then worked for the Home Office as an assistant prison governor from 1967 to 1974. He was a research officer, looking into the causes of crime, delinquency and treatment of offenders, from 1974 to 1976. Wheeler was also Director-General of the British Security Industry Association (1976–88), who made him an honorary member in 1990, and director of the National Supervisory Council for Intruder Alarms (1977–88).

== Political career ==
Wheeler was elected as Conservative MP for the marginal constituency of Paddington at the 1979 general election, winning the seat from Labour with a majority of just 106 after two recounts. He was put on the Home Affairs Select Committee as soon as it was established. At the 1983 general election, he was elected for the new constituency of Westminster North, a seat based largely on Paddington but also taking in the abolished St Marylebone constituency.

== Select Committee work ==
After 1987, Wheeler was made Chair of the Home Affairs Select Committee. He was hoping and expecting to continue this role after 1992, but found that the Conservative whips had made a rule that no member may serve on a Select Committee for more than three terms. It was suggested in the press that this rule was designed to get rid of Nicholas Winterton, who had been a troublesome chair of the Health Select Committee, and that Wheeler was regarded as 'collateral damage'.

== Northern Ireland Office ==
Friendly with John Major because of entering Parliament together and being ideologically close, Wheeler was subsequently appointed to the government, serving as Security Minister at the Northern Ireland Office; he was also made a member of the Privy Council in 1993. He was knighted in the New Year's Honours list of 1990.

== Constituency search ==
In 1995, boundary changes were announced that would expand his constituency to the west, taking in Labour-voting areas of North Kensington and tilting the seat towards Labour. Wheeler decided that he did not wish to contest such unfavourable territory and sought selection elsewhere.

In September 1995, Wheeler announced his intention to challenge Sir Nicholas Scott in the new constituency of Kensington and Chelsea. Scott was perceived as vulnerable after personal scandals and because he was a very moderate MP in a party which was moving to the right. However, Wheeler did not make the shortlist, and he was rejected elsewhere. One newspaper report suggested that Conservative Associations were put off by the security detail who had to come with Wheeler whenever he visited. He also suffered by association when the corruption of Westminster City Council under Dame Shirley Porter was uncovered: his constituency was in the city and part of the scandal included attempts to hold his seat, although Wheeler himself had done nothing wrong.

After Sir Nicholas Scott had a scandal too far and resigned, Wheeler tried again to be selected in Kensington and Chelsea but met with no more success. Although his name was mentioned whenever a Conservative seat fell vacant, he was unsuccessful and therefore retired from Parliament at the 1997 general election. His prediction of losing his old seat was indeed right, as Karen Buck of the Labour Party became the new MP for Regent's Park & Kensington North, which covered most of Wheeler's old constituency.

== Post-Parliament ==
Since leaving Parliament, Wheeler has undertaken a review of airport security for the United Kingdom and Australian governments in the light of the 11 September 2001 attacks. He was also the chairman of the Service Authorities of the National Crime Squad and the National Criminal Intelligence Service between 1997 and 2002.

Wheeler was chairman of Reliance Custodial Services Limited, part of Reliance Security Group, from 1997 to 2000. He was non-executive director of security equipment companies Jasmin Plc from 1997 to 1998, Norbain from 1998 to 1999, and corporate intelligence firm Merchant International Group from 2003. He is a patron of Prisoners Abroad, a charity that supports the welfare of Britons imprisoned overseas and their families.

Since 2004, Wheeler has been a trustee of the Police Foundation, and their vice chairman since 2010. He has been a member of the advisory board for Strategic Review of Policing in England and Wales at the Police Foundation since 2020.

== Honours ==
Wheeler became a Justice of the Peace for Inner London in 1978. He was made a Freeman of the City of London in 1987, and a Deputy Lieutenant for Greater London in 1989. He was a Deputy Lieutenant for the London Borough of Merton from 1997 to 2015. For delivering the James Smart Lecture at the Scottish Home and Health Department in 1991, he received their Silver Medal. Wheeler was made a Knight, Most Venerable Order of the Hospital of St John of Jerusalem in 1997. He received Pakistan's Hilal-i-Quaid-i-Azam in 1991 and was made a Commander of the Order of Isabella the Catholic in 2017.

== Personal life ==
In 1967, Wheeler married Laura Margaret Langley; the couple had a son and daughter. He lists his recreations in Who's Who as "enjoying life", and is a member of the Travellers Club, of which he was chairman from 2014 to 2018.

== See also ==
- Westminster Group Ltd

== Publications ==
- Who Prevents Crime? (jointly, 1980)
- The Standard Catalogue of the Coins of the British Commonwealth, 1642 to present day (1986)

Parliament of the United Kingdom
Preceded by Arthur Latham	Member of Parliament for Paddington; 1979 – 1983	Constituency abolished
New constituency	Member of Parliament for Westminster North; 1983 – 1997	Constituency abolished
