= Octavius Black =

British businessman

Octavius Orlando Irvine Casati Black CBE (born 2 May 1968) is a British businessman and founder of the company The Mind Gym.

== Early life ==
Black is the son of socialite Brinsley Black (1930–2011) and his second wife, Lady Moorea Wyatt (née Hastings) (1928–2011), who was the daughter of the Labour peer and academic Francis Hastings (1901–1990), and Cristina Casati Stampa di Soncino (1901–1953). Black's grandmother Cristina was the only child of Camillo, Marquis Casati Stampa di Soncino (1877–1946) and Italian heiress and eccentric patroness of the arts Luisa Casati (1881–1957).

Through his mother's earlier marriage to politician and diarist Woodrow Wyatt, Black has one older half-brother, Pericles Plantagenet Wyatt (born 1963). Through his father, Black has a half-sister, Eliza-Jane.

== Business career ==
After graduating from university, Black joined management consultants Booz Allen Hamilton as a business analyst, before joining the Robert Maxwell-owned AGB Research market research business. After the disappearance of Maxwell the business went into administration.

Black joined employee communication consultancy Smythe, Dorward Lambert as their sixth staff member, going on to become sales and marketing director before it was sold to Omnicom in 1996.

Between 2012 and 2014, Black wrote an occasional column in the business section of The Sunday Telegraph on the human aspects of business.

Before that, Black, along with co-founder Sebastian Bailey, started The Mind Gym at his kitchen table in 2000. The company, which is listed on the AIM market of the London Stock Exchange, designs and delivers corporate learning and development programmes. It offers 90-minute-long training sessions known as "workouts". The company serves 53% of S&P 100 and 61% of FTSE 100 companies via 400 qualified Mind Gym Coaches delivering in 40 countries. It operates from three offices (New York, London, Singapore).

In February 2018 the Mind Gym was successfully listed on the AIM with a valuation of £145 million. The same year, it was listed in the Top 20 leadership training companies by the training industry and No. 36 on the list of the Top 100 private companies with the fastest growing profits by The Sunday Times.

With co-founder Sebastian Bailey, Black co-authored three books (The Mind Gym: Wake Your Mind Up, The Mind Gym: Give Me Time, The Mind Gym: Relationships).

Black's Parent Gym is a six-week parenting programme for parents of children aged 2–11. It is funded by Black's commercial enterprise, Mind Gym, and applies its corporate training knowledge to teach parenting skills. It was piloted in 2010 and runs 150 programmes every year for parents areas including London and Brighton and Black said he hopes to roll it out nationwide.

Black was appointed Commander of the Order of the British Empire (CBE) in the 2023 New Year Honours for services to entrepreneurship, business, life sciences and the community.

Black is a regular public commentator on workplace issues, including in The Telegraph, City AM, The Times, The FT and more. He has given a TEDx talk on how to make workplaces more inclusive, and in May 2023 hosted a CHRO Summit at the Royal Opera House, London, with speakers including Dame Emma Walmsley, Martha Lane Fox, Sir Trevor Phillips and Matthew Syed.

== Personal life ==
Black married Joanne Cash, a libel barrister, in December 2007. Friends who attended their exchange of vows "included Ed Vaizey and Michael Gove, [...] Viscount and Viscountess Rothermere, Stuart Rose and Kirstie Allsopp." The Telegraph called Cash a "rising star" of the Conservative Party when she stood for Westminster North in the 2010 general election.

The couple are reported to live in Notting Hill.
