= Paddington (constituency) =

UK Parliament constituency (1974–1983)

- Former borough constituency for the House of Commons

February 1974–1983
- Seats: one
- Created from: Paddington North and Paddington South
- Replaced by: Westminster North and City of London and Westminster South

Paddington was a parliamentary constituency centred on the Paddington district of London. It returned one Member of Parliament (MP) to the House of Commons of the Parliament of the United Kingdom. The constituency was created for the February 1974 general election, partially replacing the previous Paddington North and Paddington South constituencies, and abolished for the 1983 general election. A Paddington borough constituency has three times been recommended during early stages of Boundary Commission inquiries, only to be altered before the final report was issued.

== History and boundaries ==
In the Initial Report of the Parliamentary Boundary Commission for England published in October 1947, the Commission recommended that the Metropolitan Borough of Paddington should form an undivided Parliamentary Borough returning one member, with an electorate on 15 October 1946 of 87,032. The Government brought in a Representation of the People Bill based on the recommendations, but after pressure from some affected local authorities, decided to give extra seats to some towns and cities where the electorate had resulted in the area narrowly missing out on an additional Member. Paddington was one of three Metropolitan Boroughs with very large electorates, and its total was higher than any other. On 18 March 1948 the Government put down amendments to the Bill which included awarding two seats to Paddington. A division into redrawn Paddington North and Paddington South borough constituencies followed.

In their 1967 Christmas message to their fans, Christmastime Is Here Again!, the Beatles included a skit where a game-show winner is "elected as an independent candidate for Paddington! Look after yourself!" Paddington was still a divided borough at this point, but had lost electorate. The Metropolitan Borough of Paddington had been absorbed into the City of Westminster in local government changes in April 1965. The Second Periodical Review of constituency boundaries commenced in 1965, and the City of Westminster was allocated three seats, a reduction of one. Initially the Commission proposed to transfer the Maida Vale ward from Paddington North to St Marylebone constituency, and merge the remainder of Paddington North with the whole of Paddington South in a Paddington borough constituency. Objections led to a local inquiry, which caused the commission to revise their recommendation to include Maida Vale ward in Paddington constituency while removing Hyde Park ward (previously in Paddington South) to St Marylebone. Further representations led the commission to revise their recommendations again, and to include Hyde Park ward in the Paddington constituency. The constituency was defined as the following wards of the City of Westminster: Harrow Road, Hyde Park, Lancaster Gate, Maida Vale, Queen's Park and Westbourne. The new constituency was a precise merger of the two previous Paddington divisions.

At the time, Paddington North was safe Labour, while Paddington South was safe Conservative, and the new constituency had some sharp social contrasts. A merger of the two was expected to be marginal, although in the 1970 election the Labour Party was ahead by 442 votes. When the first general election was called on the new boundaries, both sitting MPs, Arthur Latham (North) and Nicholas Scott (South), stood in the new constituency. Latham won the seat by 872 votes. The Conservatives again listed it as a 'critical seat' when the October 1974 general election was called, and selected Mark Wolfson as candidate (Nicholas Scott having been selected in Chelsea). There was a candidate from the Irish Civil Rights Association, who had resigned from the Labour Party because he opposed Government policy on internment in Northern Ireland, who hoped to win the votes of Irish voters. Arthur Latham increased his majority to 2,311.

In the 1979 general election Paddington was again a key marginal which the Conservatives hoped to gain. John Wheeler had been selected as Conservative Party prospective candidate by the summer of 1976. Labour recognised that the seat was vulnerable but hoped that Latham's good constituency reputation would give him a personal vote. Wheeler, who needed a 3.3% swing to win, campaigned on giving the many council tenants in the constituency the ability to manage their own flats. The result turned out to be so close that it went to four recounts, and the overnight count had to be postponed until the morning; during the count the returning officer at one point thought he had 1,500 more ballot papers than were issued, although it turned out to be caused by a polling station erroneously reporting the number of papers issued. Wheeler was finally declared the winner by 106 votes.

By the time the Boundary Commission began to look again at constituency boundaries in London, ward boundaries in Westminster had changed and the constituency consisted of eight electoral wards of the City of Westminster: Bayswater, Harrow Road, Hyde Park, Lancaster Gate, Little Venice, Maida Vale, Queen's Park, and Westbourne. Westminster was allocated only two constituencies in place of three, and the Boundary Commission proposed that three wards from the northern part of the abolished St Marylebone constituency, Church Street, Hamilton Terrace and Lords form part of a larger Paddington constituency. A local inquiry found that the St John's Wood area should not be divided and therefore included Regents Park ward with the other three; to equalise the electorates, it then removed Hyde Park ward from the proposed constituency into City of London and Westminster South. The local inquiry also found that including areas which were not part of Paddington led local opinion unanimously to favour naming the new constituency Westminster North.

The initial proposals by the Parliamentary Boundary Commission for England in the Sixth Periodic Review of Westminster constituencies published in October 2011 proposed a Paddington borough constituency consisting of the City of Westminster wards of Bayswater, Lancaster Gate, Harrow Road, Hyde Park, Little Venice, Maida Vale, Queen's Park and Westbourne (which were in the previous Paddington constituency), and Abbey Road ward. It also included four wards of the Royal Borough of Kensington and Chelsea: Colville, Golborne, Notting Barns and St Charles. Revised proposals published in October 2012 did not retain the Paddington constituency.

== Members of Parliament ==
Election	Member	Party	Notes
Feb 1974	Arthur Latham	Labour	Member for main predecessor seat (1969–1974)
1979	John Wheeler	Conservative	Contested Westminster North following redistribution
1983	constituency abolished: see Westminster North and City of London and Westminster South		

== Elections ==
1970 notional result
Party	Vote	%
Labour	19,500	47.6
Conservative	19,100	46.6
Liberal	2,400	5.8
Turnout	41,000	59.7
Electorate	68,637	

General election February 1974: Paddington
Party	Candidate	Votes	%	±%
Labour	Arthur Latham	17,293	43.1	–4.5
Conservative	Nicholas Scott	16,421	40.9	–5.7
Liberal	Neville Lewis	6,441	16.0	+10.2
Majority		872	2.2	+1.2
Turnout		40,155	68.9	+9.2
Registered electors		58,265		
Labour hold		Swing	+0.6	

General election October 1974: Paddington
Party	Candidate	Votes	%	±%
Labour	Arthur Latham	17,155	47.6	+4.5
Conservative	Mark Wolfson	14,844	41.2	+0.3
Liberal	Neville Lewis	3,742	10.4	–5.7
Labour Conservative Coalition	Christopher Wertheim	192	0.5	New
Irish Civil Rights Association	James Allman	135	0.4	New
Majority		2,311	6.4	+4.2
Turnout		36,068	61.7	–7.3
Registered electors		58,492		
Labour hold		Swing	+2.1	

General election 1979: Paddington
Party	Candidate	Votes	%	±%
Conservative	John Wheeler	16,189	45.5	+4.3
Labour	Arthur Latham	16,083	45.2	–2.4
Liberal	Alastair Brett	2,815	7.9	–2.5
National Front	Ian Cameron	402	1.1	New
Workers Revolutionary	Olatunji Banjo	117	0.3	New
Majority		106	0.3	N/A
Turnout		35,606	63.3	+1.7
Registered electors		56,234		
Conservative gain from Labour		Swing	+3.4	

=== Sources ===
- "British Parliamentary Election Results 1974–1983" ed. by F. W. S. Craig, Parliamentary Research Services, Chichester, 1984, p. 36.
- Return of the Expenses of each Candidate at the General Election of February 1974, House of Commons Paper 69 of session 1974–75.
- Return of the Expenses of each Candidate at the General Election of October 1974, House of Commons Paper 478 of session 1974–75.
- Return of the Expenses of each Candidate at the General Election of May 1979, House of Commons Paper 374 of session 1979–80.
