= Joanne Cash, Baroness Cash =

British lawyer (born 1969)

The Right Honourable The Baroness Cash
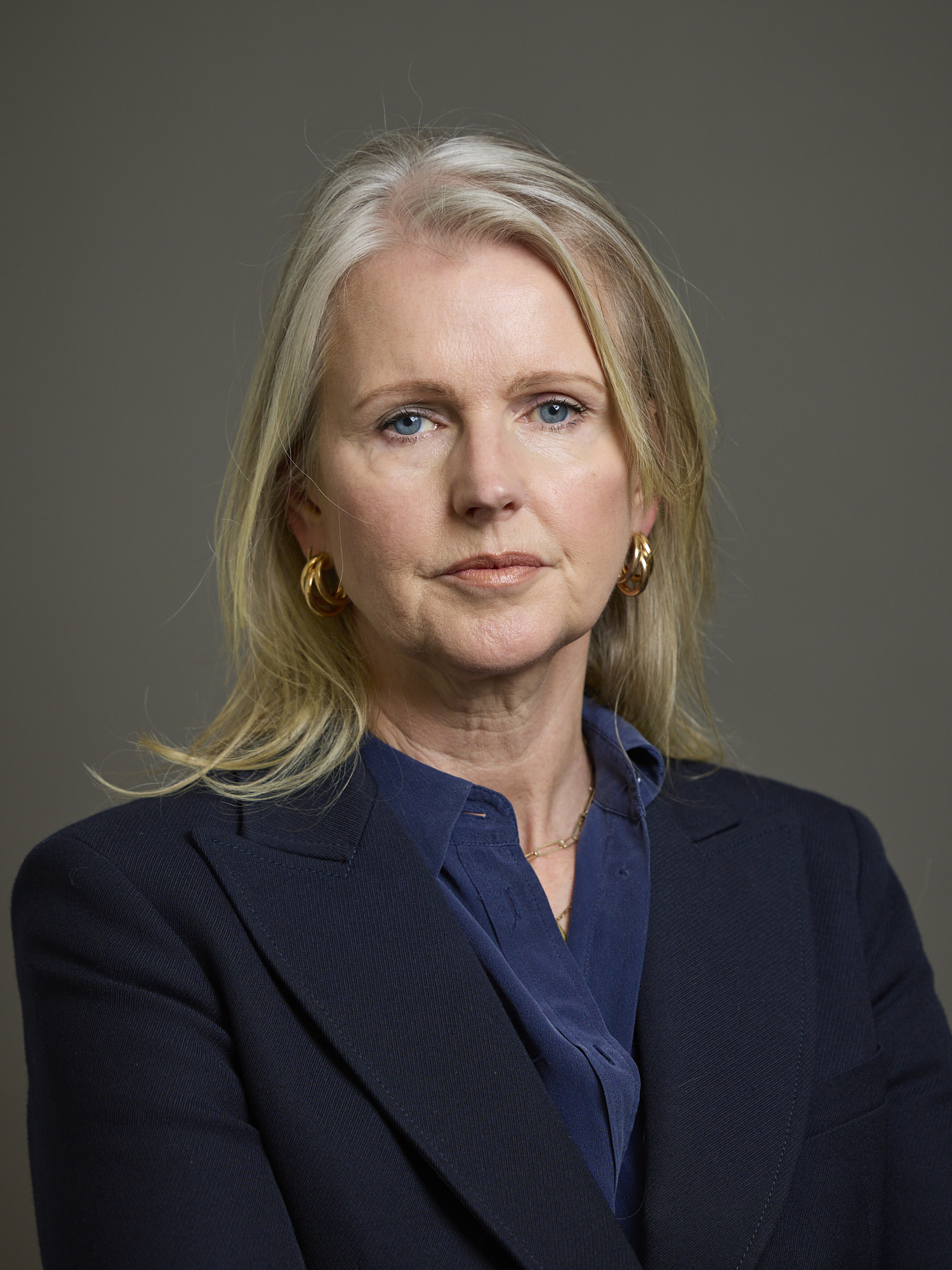
- Official portrait, 2025

Shadow Minister for Women and Equalities
- Incumbent
- Assumed office 5 June 2026
- Leader: Kemi Badenoch
- Preceded by: The Baroness Stedman-Scott

Member of the House of Lords
- Lord Temporal
- Life peerage 28 January 2025

Personal details
- Born: Joanne Catherine Cash; 28 December 1969 (age 56) Northern Ireland
- Party: Conservative
- Education: Lady Margaret Hall, Oxford
- Occupation: Barrister

Joanne Catherine Cash, Baroness Cash of Banbridge (born 28 December 1969) is a media barrister and life peer. She was the unsuccessful Conservative Party candidate for Westminster North in the 2010 general election.

== Early life and education ==
Cash was born in Northern Ireland. Her mother was a newsagent, while her father held various jobs, sometimes up to three at once. She has a brother who is an NHS doctor, and a sister who is a teacher. Cash was educated at Tandragee Primary and Banbridge Academy (both state schools). She read English Literature at Lady Margaret Hall, Oxford University.

== Legal career ==
Cash qualified as a barrister after graduating. She was called to the Bar in 1994 as a member of Gray's Inn, and became a tenant at Farrars' Building. In 2000, she joined One Brick Court to specialise in libel, privacy and freedom of expression work.

In 2005, Cash successfully represented an innocent man dubbed "the lotto rapist" in error by the Sunday Mirror winning her client considerable damages. Cash has spoken out strongly for strengthening freedom of the press, arguing that the Reynolds defence should be strengthened and that the Sullivan defence (derived from the 1964 US case New York Times Co. v. Sullivan, allowing the press to write about public figures) should be introduced to the UK. Cash hosted a debate for Policy Exchange on libel reform, believing that libel tourism ought to be curbed.

Cash has represented a number of clients, including Elle Macpherson and Trudie Styler.

She was called a "freedom fighter" in an Observer article in 2009. For her legal work, the British edition of Vogue includes Cash as one of the 50 women of the age, alongside the likes of Michelle Obama and the Queen.

== Conservative candidacy ==
As a member of the Society of Conservative Lawyers, Cash assisted the Shadow Cabinet on legal issues. She also worked with Policy Exchange the centre-right think tank to formulate policy proposals and to provide input on media issues, and enlisted governmental support from then-Shadow Justice Secretary Dominic Grieve for libel reform. She is a key Tory activist for libel reform and free speech. She was described as a Cameron Cutie.

In February 2006, she applied to become a Conservative candidate and was placed on the A-list. She was selected to fight her local seat, Westminster North, the first and only seat she had applied for, in November 2006, four months before she met her husband Octavius.

In September 2008, Tatler featured Cash as one of ten top up-and-coming Tories, tipping her as a future Housing Minister. Cash spoke to the magazine about welfare reform, arguing that teenagers without family support needed more social security for staying in education, not for "getting pregnant", although at the time students in that position were entitled to education maintenance allowance of £30 per week. Cash was described by The Times in February 2009 as "one to watch". In September 2009, she was profiled in a list of "rising stars" of the Conservative Party for The Daily Telegraph, who described her as a "Eurosceptic with a sharp mind". An article in The Sunday Telegraph in October 2009 reported "Some high-profile women are already installed in winnable seats: Louise Bagshawe, Annunziata Rees-Mogg, Priti Patel, Laura Sandys and Joanne Cash will all make colourful additions to the Tory benches." In the event, Bagshawe, Patel and Sandys were elected, while Rees-Mogg and Cash were not.

In February 2010, Cash disagreed with members of her constituency association over strategies to win the seat, with the result that David Cameron, the leader of the party and opposition leader but not yet prime minister, intervened to sack Amanda Sayers, chair of the Westminster North Conservative Association. Cash then commented on her Twitter page that her opponents were "dinosaurs". Shortly afterwards Cash tendered her resignation as candidate, but the Conservatives did not accept it, and she continued to campaign for Westminster North until the election in May.

Cash failed to gain the new seat from the incumbent Labour member for Regent's Park and Kensington North, Karen Buck. When she failed to secure the seat, she accused the media of lying about her and her husband.

== Personal life ==
In December 2007, Cash married Octavius Black, the founder and managing director of The Mind Gym. (Note: Not to be confused with Brain Gym.) Friends who attended their exchange of vows included Conservative ministers Ed Vaizey and Michael Gove; Daily Mail owner Jonathan Harmsworth, 4th Viscount Rothermere, and his wife; then-Marks & Spencer chairman Stuart Rose; and TV presenter Kirstie Allsopp. Black was educated at Eton College at the same time as David Cameron; the two men have stayed close, and they and their wives socialise together. The couple are reported to live in Notting Hill. They have a daughter.

In December 2024, Cash was nominated to be a Conservative life peer as part of the 2024 Political Peerages. She was created as Baroness Cash, of Banbridge in the County of Down on 28 January 2025.
