= Hilldene (ward) =

Former electoral ward in London, England

- Former electoral ward for the Havering London Borough Council
- Hilldene ward boundaries from 1978 to 2002
- Borough: Havering
- County: Greater London
- Major settlements: Harold Hill

Former electoral ward
- Created: 1965
- Abolished: 2002
- Councillors: 1965–1978: 2; 1978–2002: 3

Hilldene was an electoral ward in the London Borough of Havering from 1965 to 2002. The ward was first used in the 1964 elections and last used for the 1998 elections. It returned councillors to Havering London Borough Council.

The ward was subject to a boundary revision in 1978 that increased the number of councillors from two to three. The ward covered part of the London County Council-built Harold Hill estate that was completed in 1958. (Note: The remainder of the estate was represented by councillors elected from the Gooshays and Heaton wards.) The ward was only represented by Labour Party councillors, most notably Arthur Latham who was MP for Paddington North and then Paddington.

== List of councillors ==
Term	Councillor	Party
1964–1969	Arthur Latham	Labour
1964–1968	W. Russell	Labour
1964–1971	Reg Whiting	Labour
1975–1986	Reg Whiting	Labour
1969–1971	Stanley Heath-Coleman	Labour
1971–1975	May Rudlin	Labour
1974–1982	Ron Whitworth	Labour
1978–1990	Bessie Whitworth	Labour
1982–1990	Dennis Cook	Labour
1992–1998	Dennis Cook	Labour
1986–1990	Dereck Smith	Labour
1990–2002	Wilf Mills	Labour
1990–1992	Mark Flewitt	Labour
1990–1998	Anthony Hunt	Labour
1998–2002	David Hill	Labour
1998–2002	Ann Roberts	Labour

== 1978–2002 Havering council elections ==
There was a revision of ward boundaries in Havering in 1978.

=== 1998 election ===
The election on 7 May 1998 took place on the same day as the 1998 Greater London Authority referendum.

1998 Havering London Borough Council election: Hilldene (3)
Party	Candidate	Votes	%	±%
Labour	Wilf Mills	1,088		
Labour	David Hill	1,085		
Labour	Ann Roberts	1,042		
Conservative	John Neill	442		
Conservative	Cornelius Desmond	372		
Conservative	Andrew Everett	363		
Turnout				
Labour hold		Swing		
Labour hold		Swing		
Labour hold		Swing		

=== 1994 election ===
The election took place on 5 May 1994.

1994 Havering London Borough Council election: Hilldene (3)
Party	Candidate	Votes	%	±%
Labour	Dennis Cook	1,894	71.27	▼2.61
Labour	Wilf Mills	1,700		
Labour	Anthony Hunt	1,682		
Conservative	Anne Cannings	481	18.48	▼7.64
Conservative	David Hayhow	452		
Conservative	Henry Tebbut	436		
Liberal Democrats	John Hewitt	258	10.25	New
Liberal Democrats	Alison Jasper	254		
Liberal Democrats	Keith Plant	246		
Registered electors		6,298		▼235
Turnout		2,679	42.54	▼4.53
Rejected ballots		1	0.04	▼0.61
Labour hold				
Labour hold				
Labour hold				

=== 1992 by-election ===
The by-election took place on 2 July 1992, following the resignation of Mark Flewitt.

1992 Hilldene by-election
Party	Candidate	Votes	%	±%
Labour	Dennis Cook	982	54.2	
Liberal Democrats	Terry Hurlstone	441	24.4	
Conservative	John Nicholls	388	21.4	
Turnout			28.1	
Labour hold		Swing		

=== 1990 election ===
The election took place on 3 May 1990.

1990 Havering London Borough Council election: Hilldene (3)
Party	Candidate	Votes	%	±%
Labour	Mark Flewitt	2,178		
Labour	Wilf Mills	2,154		
Labour	Anthony Hunt	2,151		
Conservative	Henry Tebbutt	774		
Conservative	David Lei	766		
Conservative	Roy White	751		
Turnout				
Labour hold		Swing		
Labour hold		Swing		
Labour hold		Swing		

=== 1986 election ===
The election took place on 8 May 1986.

1986 Havering London Borough Council election: Hilldene (3)
Party	Candidate	Votes	%	±%
Labour	Dennis Cook	1,586		
Labour	Dereck Smith	1,430		
Labour	Bessie Whitworth	1,405		
Conservative	David Ratcliffe	1,026		
Conservative	Martin Davis	1,025		
Conservative	Mark Melvin	985		
Alliance	Graham Bridgeman-Clarke	355		
Alliance	Rodney Dorken	326		
Alliance	William Barrett	309		
National Front	Christopher Dowsett	108		
Turnout				
Labour hold		Swing		
Labour hold		Swing		
Labour hold		Swing		

=== 1982 election ===
The election took place on 6 May 1982.

1982 Havering London Borough Council election: Hilldene (3)
Party	Candidate	Votes	%	±%
Labour	Dennis Cook	1,380		
Labour	Reg Whiting	1,303		
Labour	Bessie Whitworth	1,258		
Conservative	David Ratcliffe	707		
Conservative	Marilyn Tonks	657		
Conservative	Shireen Sycamore	652		
Turnout				
Labour hold		Swing		
Labour hold		Swing		
Labour hold		Swing		

=== 1978 election ===
The election took place on 4 May 1978.

1978 Havering London Borough Council election: Hilldene (3)
Party	Candidate	Votes	%	±%
Labour	Reg Whiting	1,479		
Labour	Bessie Whitworth	1,440		
Labour	Ron Whitworth	1,412		
Conservative	Stanley Martin	771		
Conservative	Geoffrey Wright	729		
Conservative	Jane Wright	695		
Turnout				
Labour win (new boundaries)				
Labour win (new boundaries)				
Labour win (new boundaries)				

== 1964–1978 Havering council elections ==
External image
- Map showing Hilldene ward boundaries from 1965 to 1978

=== 1975 by-election ===
The by-election took place on 24 April 1975.

1975 Hilldene by-election
Party	Candidate	Votes	%	±%
Labour	Reg Whiting	1,195		
Conservative	Stephen Brabner	326		
Liberal	David Ingle	239		
Turnout			25.0	
Labour hold		Swing		

=== 1974 election ===
The election took place on 2 May 1974.

1974 Havering London Borough Council election: Hilldene (2)
Party	Candidate	Votes	%	±%
Labour	Ron Whitworth	1,558		
Labour	May Rudlin	1,524		
Conservative	W. Thompson	341		
Conservative	R. Brabner	325		
Turnout				
Labour hold		Swing		
Labour hold		Swing		

=== 1971 by-election ===
The by-election took place on 8 July 1971.

1971 Hilldene by-election
Party	Candidate	Votes	%	±%
Labour	May Rudlin	1,299		
Conservative	Les Reilly	116		
Communist	R. Cohen	56		
Dwarf	C. Thomson	22		
Liberal	T. Keeper	21		
Turnout			20.5%	
Labour hold		Swing		

=== 1971 election ===
The election took place on 13 May 1971.

1971 Havering London Borough Council election: Hilldene (2)
Party	Candidate	Votes	%	±%
Labour	Stanley Heath-Coleman	2,684		
Labour	Reg Whiting	2,668		
Conservative	M. Heagerty	213		
Conservative	M. Orrin	199		
Communist	R. Cohen	137		
Turnout				
Labour hold		Swing		
Labour hold		Swing		

=== 1969 by-election ===
The by-election took place on 4 December 1969.

1969 Hilldene by-election
Party	Candidate	Votes	%	±%
Labour	Stanley Heath-Coleman	986		
Conservative	R. Ramsey	199		
Communist	R. Cohen	56		
Independent	K. Roe	53		
Turnout			19.1%	
Labour hold		Swing		

=== 1968 election ===
The election took place on 9 May 1968.

1968 Havering London Borough Council election: Hilldene (2)
Party	Candidate	Votes	%	±%
Labour	Arthur Latham	1,088		
Labour	Reg Whiting	1,049		
Conservative	P. Marsden	572		
Conservative	J. Barrance	519		
Communist	R. Cohen	104		
Turnout				
Labour hold		Swing		
Labour hold		Swing		

=== 1964 election ===
The election took place on 7 May 1964.

1964 Havering London Borough Council election: Hilldene (2)
Party	Candidate	Votes	%	±%
Labour	Arthur Latham	1,720		
Labour	W. Russell	1,719		
Conservative	A. Dicks	228		
Conservative	J. Holiday	228		
Communist	W. French	59		
Turnout		1,997	30.4	
Labour win (new seat)				
Labour win (new seat)				
