= Arthur Latham =

British politician (1930–2016)

Member of Parliament for Paddington
- In office 28 February 1974 – 7 April 1979
- Preceded by: constituency established
- Succeeded by: John Wheeler

Member of Parliament for Paddington North
- In office 30 October 1969 – 8 February 1974
- Preceded by: Ben Parkin
- Succeeded by: constituency abolished

Personal details
- Born: 14 August 1930 Leyton, Essex, England
- Died: 3 December 2016 (aged 86)
- Party: Labour
- Spouse(s): Ruby Green (m. 1951; died 2000) Caroline Warren (m. 2001)
- Children: 2
- Education: London School of Economics

Arthur Charles Latham (14 August 1930 – 3 December 2016) was a British Labour Party politician, who was the MP for Paddington North from 1969 to 1974, and its successor seat, Paddington, from that year until 1979.

== Early life and education ==
Latham was born in Leyton, Essex (now part of Greater London). He was educated at Garnett College of Education, the Royal Liberty School in Romford, Essex, and the London School of Economics.

== Career ==
Latham worked as a methods consultant at an import-export firm. He became involved in politics whilst in his teenage years, joining the Labour Party in 1944, and was the party candidate in his school's mock election the following year. During the 1945 election campaign, he recruited 100 new members, and he later became Vice-Chairman of the National Committee for the Labour League of Youth in 1949, a position he held until 1953. In 1952, he was elected to Romford Borough Council in Essex: at the age of 21, he was its youngest member. He served as councillor and then alderman and was the last Leader of the Labour Group on the council.

At the 1959 general election, Latham stood against the former Prime Minister Winston Churchill in the safe Conservative seat of Woodford, in Essex, but was unsuccessful, despite increasing the Labour vote; it would turn out to be Churchill's last election. Romford Borough Council was replaced by Havering Council in 1965, when Romford became part of Greater London.

Latham was elected to represent Havering's Hilldene ward (centred on the Harold Hill area) in 1964. He was Leader of the Labour Group from 1965 to 1970. He was an alderman on the council from 1964 to 1968. He was elected from Hilldene again in 1968 and was then an alderman again from 1970 to 1978 when the office was abolished. At the 1964 general election, Latham contested the marginal Rushcliffe seat, but despite reducing the Conservative majority, failed to be elected. From 1967 onwards, he was a lecturer at Southgate Technical College. Outside of politics, Latham was a member of the North-East Regional Metropolitan Hospital Board, which covered parts of East London and Essex, from 1966 to 1972.

=== Member of Parliament ===
He was narrowly elected as the Member of Parliament for Paddington North in a 1969 by-election, following the death of the left-wing Labour incumbent, Ben Parkin. Coming five years into Labour leader Harold Wilson's term as Prime Minister, there was a large swing to the opposition Conservative Party, and Latham held the seat for Labour by just 517 votes (3.4%). The same year, he became Treasurer of the civil rights advocacy group Movement for Colonial Freedom, which was renamed Liberation in 1970. He remained in this role until 1979.

Following the 1970 general election, which saw Latham hold his seat with an increased majority, he championed the cause of the Irish Nationalist MP Bernadette Devlin, who had been imprisoned for incitement to riot. He visited her in Armagh prison, and secured an agreement that she could deal with her constituency correspondence. Following the February 1974 general election (owing to boundary changes), Latham became MP for Paddington.

In Parliament, he was founder, and joint chairman, of the All-Party Group for Pensioners from 1971 to 1979. He was also chairman of the Tribune Group of soft-left Labour MPs from 1975 to 1976 (and its treasurer from 1977 to 1979). From 1977 to 1986, he was chairman of the Greater London Labour Party. At the 1978 local elections, Latham stood for election to Chase Cross ward in Romford, but lost out to the Conservative candidates. His wife, Ruby, who had first been elected to Mawney (also in Romford) in 1971, lost her seat at that election.

In 1979, Latham lost his Paddington seat to the Conservative John Wheeler by 106 votes (0.3% of the total). It was so close that Latham asked for three recounts, and the result was not declared until late on the Friday morning.

=== After Parliament ===
In 1981, Latham was shortlisted to be Labour's candidate for the forthcoming Bermondsey by-election, but lost out to Peter Tatchell (who failed to be elected). With boundary changes, Latham's former Paddington seat was largely replaced by Westminster North for the 1983 general election. Latham contested Westminster North, but it was held by the Conservatives. From 1983 to 1984, he was a non-executive Director of the London Transport Board.

At the 1986 local elections, Latham was again elected to the Havering Council as a councillor, representing the Brooklands ward in Romford. He was once again Leader of the Labour Group, holding this title from 1986 to 1998. From 1986 to 1990, he was Leader of the Opposition, and then, from 1990 to 1996, Leader of the Council. Latham was also Vice-President of the Association of Metropolitan Authorities.

Latham was challenged over his leadership in 1995 and 1997. On the latter occasion, it followed discussions over the effect on the party of Liberal Democrat activist Terry Hurlstone's conviction for assaulting Latham. This incident occurred in March 1996, during an argument over Latham's friendship with Hurlstone's estranged wife, Liberal Democrat Group Leader Cllr Caroline Hurlstone. At the time, Latham was running a minority administration and was dependent on the votes of Liberal Democrat councillors. In May 1996, Hurlestone defected to the Labour Party.

That month, rumours of an affair between Hurlstone and Latham were said to have led to other defections on the council, which eventually led to the end of the ruling Lib-Lab coalition. In December 1996, Terry Hurlstone, a former Liberal Democrat parliamentary candidate, was convicted of common assault, but cleared of theft, having been accused of stealing a notebook from Latham.

Caroline was an English teacher who had won Channel 4's Fifteen to One quiz show twice, and appeared as a contestant on the BBC's Mastermind. In January 1997, Hornchurch Constituency Labour Party passed a motion of no confidence in Latham; however, in May that year, the Labour Group voted him back in as Group Leader. Latham resigned as Group Leader in December 1997, leading to Labour regaining control of the council. Latham stood down as a councillor at the 1998 local elections. He later married Caroline, who had become known as Caroline Warren. At the 1998 elections, she stood for re-election as a Labour candidate in St Edward's ward, but was not elected.

During his career, Latham was Vice-President of Labour Action for Peace, and a member of the British Campaign for Peace in Vietnam and the Campaign for Nuclear Disarmament. In keeping with these left-wing stances, he resigned from the Labour Party in May 2003 over the Iraq War (instigated by a Labour government) and other issues. However, he rejoined the party in 2007.

== Personal life ==
In 1951, he married Ruby Margaret Green, and they had two children: a son, Howard Arthur, and a daughter, Diana Margaret. Howard became a councillor for the Bellenden ward in Southwark in 1994, and then for Alleyn in the same borough in 1998. Ruby was a fellow Havering borough councillor, representing Heaton ward in Upminster for the Labour and Co-operative Party until her death in 2001. She died in November 2000, and Latham married Caroline Warren in 2001.

Latham was a vegetarian. His recreations were listed in Who's Who as "bridge, chess, cricket, country music, walking, theatre, Chelsea Football Club, pet rats". He lived in Romford. Latham died in December 2016, aged 86.

Parliament of the United Kingdom
Preceded by Ben Parkin	Member of Parliament for Paddington North; 1969 – Feb 1974	Constituency abolished
New constituency	Member of Parliament for Paddington; Feb 1974 – 1979	Succeeded by John Wheeler
Party political offices
Preceded by Bob Mellish	Chair of the London Labour Party; 1977 – 1986	Succeeded by Glenys Thornton
