= Karen Buck =

British Labour politician (born 1958)

Dame Karen Buck DBE
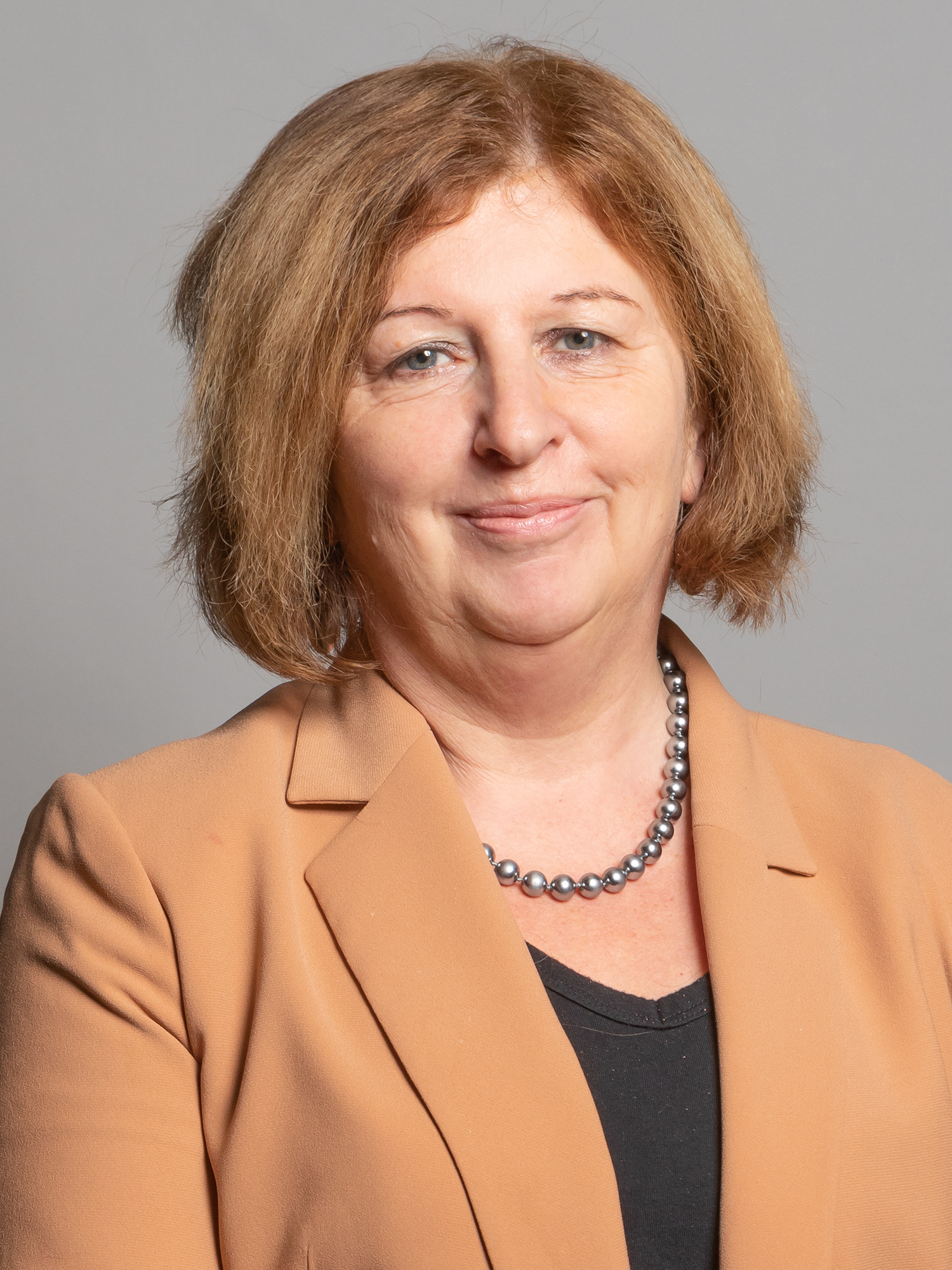
- Official portrait, 2020

Parliamentary Under-Secretary of State for Transport
- In office 10 May 2005 – 16 March 2006
- Prime Minister: Tony Blair
- Preceded by: Charlotte Atkins
- Succeeded by: Gillian Merron

Member of Parliament for Westminster North Regent's Park and Kensington North (1997–2010)
- In office 1 May 1997 – 30 May 2024
- Preceded by: John Wheeler
- Succeeded by: Constituency abolished

Member of Westminster City Council for Queen's Park
- In office 3 May 1990 – 16 October 1997
- Succeeded by: Paul Dimoldenberg

Personal details
- Born: Karen Patricia Buck; 30 August 1958 (age 68) Castlederg, County Tyrone, Northern Ireland
- Party: Labour
- Spouse: Barrie Taylor (m. 2000; died 2024)
- Children: 1
- Education: London School of Economics (BSc, MSc, MA)

Dame Karen Patricia Buck (born 30 August 1958) is a British Labour Party politician who was the Member of Parliament (MP) for Westminster North, and previously Regent's Park and Kensington North, from 1997 to 2024. She also served on Westminster City Council from 1990 to 1997. As of 2025, she chairs the Old Oak and Park Royal Development Corporation (OPDC).

== Early life ==
Born in Castlederg, County Tyrone, Northern Ireland, in 1958, Buck was educated at the Chelmsford County High School for Girls and the London School of Economics, from where she was awarded a BSc and an MSc in Economics, and an MA in Social Policy and Administration. Buck was briefly a Young Liberal.

== Career ==
Buck joined the Labour Party in 1978. The following year, she became a research and development worker with Outset, a charity working with disabled people, before joining Hackney London Borough Council in 1983, initially working for them as a senior disability officer, and from 1986 as a public health officer.

Buck first ran for election in the 1982 Barnet London Borough Council election, aged 23, as one of the three unsuccessful Labour candidates in the borough's Mill Hill ward (based around the area of that name). In 1986 she stood in Westminster City Council's Cavendish ward, an area straddling Marylebone and the West End of London. Despite the large increase in the Labour vote, all three seats were narrowly retained by the Conservatives, in a tightly contested election which saw Labour come close to winning the council.

She began working for the Labour Party in 1987 as a health directorate researcher, becoming a campaign strategy coordinator in 1992, a role she held until 1996. From 1988 to 1990, she was chair of Westminster North Constituency Labour Party (CLP).

She was elected to Westminster City Council in 1990, representing Queen's Park ward (situated around the area of that name) in a safe seat for her party. Buck remained on the council until shortly after her election to parliament in 1997, when she stood down. Whilst a councillor, she was involved in exposing the fraudulent behaviour of council leader Shirley Porter and the homes for votes scandal.

== Parliamentary career ==
Buck was selected to stand for election for Labour through an all-women shortlist, in a seat which was based largely on the former Westminster North constituency, held narrowly at the 1992 general election by the former Conservative minister John Wheeler. He retired, and Buck was elected at the 1997 general election as the Labour MP for Regent's Park and Kensington North with a majority of 14,657 (31%), on a night which saw a historic Labour landslide win. She made her maiden speech on 17 June 1997, and would serve continuously as an MP for 27 years, in constituencies which included the ward she represented as a councillor. In a 2005 profile, Buck was described as "A bright and humorous centre-left feminist" who "has the perfect New Labour pedigree." From 1998 to 2005, she chaired the London Group of Labour MPs.

Following her election to Parliament, she joined the Social Security Select committee, remaining on it until the 2001 general election. Despite a small decline in the Labour vote, she comfortably held the seat, with a majority of over 10,000 votes (and a 27.7% lead over her nearest rival).

Buck subsequently joined the Work and Pensions Select Committee, which she was a member of until 2005. In 2001, her appointment as an Assistant Government Whip was announced without her knowledge and consent; she declined to take up the post. However, she did become a member of Prime Minister Tony Blair's government in the wake of the 2005 general election, as the Parliamentary Under Secretary of State at the Department for Transport. Despite a 6.3% swing to the Conservatives, and her vote share falling to 44.7%, she retained her seat with a majority of 6,131 (15.1%). Buck sat on the Home Affairs Select Committee from 2006 to 2010.

In 2009, Buck was one of 95 MPs who signed the motion that created Labour Friends of Palestine and the Middle East.

At the 2010 general election, she was elected as the MP for the newly recreated marginal seat of Westminster North, with a majority of 2,126 (5.4%) over Joanne Cash, the Conservative candidate, in a high-profile race. Following Labour's election defeat, Buck nominated Ed Miliband to succeed Gordon Brown, who had replaced Blair as Labour leader and prime minister. Miliband subsequently won the party's 2010 leadership contest. During his tenure as Labour leader, Buck served as Shadow Minister for Welfare Reform from 2010 to 2011 and Further Education from 2011 to 2013. She was appointed Parliamentary Private Secretary to Miliband, alongside Wayne David, in 2013, and continued in the position until 2015.

At the 2015 election, she was re-elected with a slightly decreased majority of 1,977 (5.0%), while Labour remained in opposition. Miliband resigned as leader, and Buck nominated Yvette Cooper in the resulting leadership election. Cooper came third, with Jeremy Corbyn becoming party leader; Buck did not serve in any posts during his leadership tenure. In July 2015, she was appointed to the Work and Pensions Committee, remaining on it until 2017. From 2015 to 2017, she was also a member of the Joint Committee on Human Rights and the Panel of Chairs.

In the 2016 Labour leadership election, when Corbyn was unsuccessfully challenged by Owen Smith, Buck nominated Smith. At the 2017 general election, Buck increased her majority by 14.7%, to 11,512 (26.6%), representing a 10.8% swing to Labour in the constituency.

Buck campaigned for 'Remain' in the 2016 European Union membership referendum, and voted against the triggering of Article 50 in Parliament. In a message posted on her website in November 2018, she wrote, "Most of my constituents know that I have always believed that Brexit would be a disaster and that no possible deal could replicate the advantages of our remaining in the EU." She continued, "And while I respect the deeply held views of many people who voted to leave, the fact remains that the 'Leave' campaign was based on a raft of promises which could never realistically be delivered, and a false prospectus was put before the British people."

In December 2018, Buck's Private Member's Bill received Royal Assent as the Homes (Fitness for Human Habitation) Act, coming into force on 20 March 2019. If a landlord failed to let and maintain a property that was fit for human habitation, the Bill would give tenants the right to take action in the courts. The Bill received cross-party support. She was re-elected at the 2019 general election, with a small swing away from Labour, again with a substantial majority of 10,759 (25.07%), suggesting that Westminster North had become a safe seat. Nationally, Labour were defeated for the fourth time in a row, and a leadership election was held in 2020 to replace Corbyn. Buck nominated Keir Starmer, who won, and consequently became party leader. She was appointed Shadow Minister for Social Security in July 2020, serving in the role until she stepped down in September 2023.

In January 2024, Buck announced that she would be standing down at the next general election; it was subsequently called in May, and held in July that year. She was appointed a Dame Commander of the Order of the British Empire in the 2024 Birthday Honours, which were announced in June.

== Political views ==
Buck expressed concerns in 2018 that homeless Londoners were forced to move out of the city, stating: "Losing your home is a deeply traumatic event and then being offered accommodation miles away from your community, your work, your children's school and your care responsibilities compounds all that trauma. People are struggling against the most appalling odds to hold their own lives together and above all to hold their kids' lives together."

She voted in favour of the hunting ban and gay marriage, whilst in 2007, she voted against replacing Trident. Buck was previously a member of the Campaign for Nuclear Disarmament. Whilst an MP, she was a member of Greenpeace and Amnesty International.

Buck was formerly a member of two white-collar public service trade unions, the Association of Scientific, Technical and Managerial Staffs (ASTMS) and the National and Local Government Officers' Association (NALGO). Before it merged with Amicus, she was a member of the Transport and General Workers' Union (TGWU).

== Post-Parliament ==
In January 2025, Buck was appointed by the Mayor of London to chair the Old Oak and Park Royal Development Corporation (OPDC). Commenting on the appointment, she said, "This is such an exciting development with so much potential. I am hugely looking forward to working with the Board and team at OPDC as it moves into the next phase of delivering the homes and jobs London needs."

== Personal life ==
Buck is a Roman Catholic. In 2000, she married Barrie Taylor, with whom she had a son. In December 2006, it was reported that she was withdrawing her 12-year old son from Paddington Academy, one of the government's "flagship" city academies, claiming that the teaching facilities and accommodation were "appalling".

Buck and Taylor served alongside each other on Westminster City Council, with both representing Queen's Park from 1994 to 1997. Taylor died in 2024.

== In popular culture ==
In the 1999 novel, Bridget Jones: The Edge of Reason, the protagonist, Bridget Jones, is asked by her friend Tom which candidate she will be voting for on the day of the 1997 general election. Jones looks for a red (Labour) sign on a lamppost and responds, "Buck!" In the novel, Jones is a resident of Notting Hill, an area which was part of Buck's original constituency, Regent's Park and Kensington North. However, Jones is unable to vote, since she is not registered, and she subsequently worries about the effect this could have on the election result: "What if Buck loses by one vote then entire election lost by one seat? Will be my fault, my fault."

Parliament of the United Kingdom
New constituency see Boundary Commissions	Member of Parliament for Regent's Park and Kensington North; 1997–2010	Constituency abolished
New constituency see Boundary Commissions	Member of Parliament for Westminster North; 2010–2024	Constituency abolished
Political offices
Preceded by Iain Wright	Shadow Minister for Education; 2011–2013	Succeeded by Tristram Hunt
Preceded by John Denham	Parliamentary Private Secretary to the Leader of the Opposition; 2013–2015	Succeeded by Steve Rotheram
