= Regent's Park and Kensington North =

UK Parliament constituency (1997–2010)

Coordinates: 51.527°N 0.187°W

- Former borough constituency for the House of Commons
- Boundary of Regent's Park and Kensington North in Greater London for the 2005 general election
- County: Greater London

1997–2010
- Seats: One
- Created from: Westminster North, Kensington
- Replaced by: Westminster North, Kensington

Regent's Park and Kensington North was a constituency in Central and West London represented in the House of Commons of the UK Parliament. It elected one Member of Parliament (MP) by the first-past-the-post system of election from 1997 to 2010.

== History ==
The constituency was created in 1997 from parts of the former seats of Westminster North and Kensington. It was abolished at the 2010 general election.

With its stark contrasts between prosperity and deprivation, the constituency should have been a highly competitive marginal between the Conservative Party and Labour Party in an even year, although for the three general elections of its existence it was won firmly by Labour. Before its creation it was considered a constituency likely to produce low swings which would be won on differential turnout, similar to its predecessor seats. However, in the political climate of the late 1990s and early 2000s, in which Tony Blair's New Labour dominated, this proved not to be the case.

== Boundaries ==
The constituency covered the areas of St John's Wood, Maida Vale, the Harrow Road, Westbourne Green, Maida Hill, Little Venice, parts of Queen's Park, parts of Ladbroke Grove and Notting Hill, as well as North Kensington.

The electoral wards of the constituency were:

- From the Royal Borough of Kensington and Chelsea: Avondale; Colville; Golborne; Kelfield; St Charles.

Following boundary changes for local elections in 2002, Avondale and Kelfield wards were combined to create Notting Barns.

- From the City of Westminster: Church Street; Hamilton Terrace; Harrow Road; Little Venice; Lords; Maida Vale; Queen's Park; Regent's Park; Westbourne.

In 2002, a Local Government Boundary Commission for England review abolished the Hamilton Terrace and Lords wards, with the areas absorbed by Regent's Park and the new ward of Abbey Road.

For the 2005 general election, the electoral wards used in this constituency were Bayswater (part), Bryanston and Dorset Square (part), Colville, Church Street, Golborne, Harrow Road, Little Venice, Maida Vale, Norland (part), Notting Barns, Queen's Park, Regent's Park, St Charles and Westbourne.

Despite the name, the seat did not include the area in the Regent's Park ward of the London Borough of Camden.

=== Abolition ===
The Boundary Commission proposed that the City of Westminster, together with the sparsely populated City of London, receive two seats in its own right from the 2010 general election. As a result, Regent's Park and Kensington North was abolished, with most of the Westminster section going into a reformed Westminster North seat and the Kensington and Chelsea section going into a reformed Kensington seat, Chelsea being transferred to the new Chelsea and Fulham seat. The remainder of Westminster (chiefly the part taken from Bryanston and Dorset Square) was combined with the City of London in the Cities of London and Westminster seat. The part of Bayswater ward used in the latter, together with Lancaster Gate, were moved into Westminster North. These changes were implemented in 2010.

== Members of Parliament ==
Election	Member	Party
1997	Karen Buck	Labour
2010	constituency abolished: see Westminster North & Kensington	

== Elections ==
=== Elections in the 2000s ===
General election 2005: Regent's Park and Kensington North
Party	Candidate	Votes	%	±%
Labour	Karen Buck	18,196	44.7	−9.9
Conservative	Jeremy Bradshaw	12,065	29.7	+2.8
Liberal Democrats	Rabi Martins	7,569	18.6	+6.0
Green	Paul Miller	1,985	4.9	+1.5
UKIP	Pamela Perrin	456	1.1	+0.1
Civilisation Party	Rezouk Boufas	227	0.6	New
Independent	Abby Dharamsey	182	0.4	New
Majority		6,131	15.0	−12.7
Turnout		40,680	51.5	+2.7
Registered electors		75,886		
Labour hold		Swing	−6.3	

General election 2001: Regent's Park and Kensington North
Party	Candidate	Votes	%	±%
Labour	Karen Buck	20,247	54.6	−5.3
Conservative	Peter Wilson	9,981	26.9	−2.1
Liberal Democrats	David Boyle	4,669	12.6	+4.1
Green	Paul Miller	1,268	3.4	New
Socialist Alliance	China Miéville	459	1.2	New
UKIP	Alan Crisp	354	1.0	New
Independent	Charlotte Regan	74	0.2	New
Majority		10,266	27.7	−3.2
Turnout		37,052	48.8	−19.6
Registered electors		75,886		
Labour hold		Swing	−3.7	

=== Elections in the 1990s ===
General election 1997: Regent's Park and Kensington North
Party	Candidate	Votes	%	±%
Labour	Karen Buck	28,367	59.9	+11.6
Conservative	Paul McGuinness	13,710	29.0	−12.1
Liberal Democrats	Emily Gasson	4,041	8.5	+0.6
Referendum	Sandra Dangoor	867	1.8	New
Natural Law	Jonathan Hinde	192	0.4	New
Rainbow Dream Ticket	Debbie Sadowitz	167	0.4	New
Majority		14,657	31.0	+23.7
Turnout		47,344	64.2	–10.7
Registered electors		73,752		
Labour hold		Swing	+11.8	

1992 notional result
Party	Vote	%
Labour	25,317	48.3
Conservative	21,503	41.1
Liberal Democrats	4,163	7.9
Others	1,385	2.6
Turnout	52,368	74.9
Electorate	69,959	

== See also ==
- List of parliamentary constituencies in London
