= Westminster North =

UK Parliament constituency (1983–1997, 2010–2024)

Coordinates: 51.525°N 0.180°W

- Former borough constituency for the House of Commons
- Boundary of Westminster North in Greater London
- County: Greater London
- Electorate: 65,936 (December 2010)
- Major settlements: Maida Vale; St John's Wood; Queen's Park; Bayswater

2010–2024
- Seats: One
- Created from: Regent's Park and Kensington North; Cities of London and Westminster (one ward and parts of two others)
- Replaced by: Cities of London and Westminster, Kensington and Bayswater, Queen's Park and Maida Vale

1983–1997
- Seats: One
- Created from: Paddington and St Marylebone
- Replaced by: Regent's Park and Kensington North; Cities of London and Westminster

Westminster North was a constituency (Note: A borough constituency (for the purposes of election expenses and type of returning officer).) in Greater London represented in the House of Commons of the UK Parliament. (Note: As with all constituencies, the constituency elects one Member of Parliament (MP) by the first past the post system of election at least every five years.) It existed for the periods 1983–1997 and 2010–2024.

Further to the completion of the 2023 Periodic Review of Westminster constituencies, the seat was abolished, with the majority being included in the new constituency of Queen's Park and Maida Vale. The Abbey Road and Regent's Park wards were transferred to Cities of London and Westminster, and the Bayswater and Lancaster Gate wards to Kensington and Bayswater.

== Constituency profile ==
Comprising the northwestern part of the City of Westminster, the constituency contained some affluent residential areas that have historically voted Conservative in large numbers, such as Bayswater and the area on the western and northwestern sides of Regent's Park.

Lord's Cricket Ground and the Abbey Road Studios are in the seat, as are the Queen's Park, Church Street, Westbourne Park, and Harrow Road areas, further from central London. However, the seat has mostly been represented at local level by Conservative councillors, via the wards of Little Venice, Regent's Park, Abbey Road and Lancaster Gate, while Maida Vale and Bayswater have had split representation.

Reflective of the transport links to the selective professional industries of the City of London and long-standing desirable housing in this area, workless claimants who were registered jobseekers were in November 2012 lower than the national average of 3.8%, at 2.9% of the population, based on a statistical compilation by The Guardian.

== History ==
=== 1983–1997 ===
The seat was created under the Third Periodic Review of constituencies in 1983, which followed the first Boundary Commission Review in 1945, which in turn directly followed the Representation of the People Act 1918 review. It was based largely on Paddington but also took in the abolished St Marylebone constituency.

Political history

The seat was held with modest majorities for the first creation, made up of three terms, by John Wheeler, a Conservative. Paddington constituency, its main predecessor was often marginal: by length of a single party's representation and by majorities achieved. The far less contributory precursor, St Marylebone, was a Conservative safe seat.

The 1997 boundary changes expanded the constituency to the west, taking in Labour-voting areas of north Kensington and tilting the seat towards Labour. Wheeler decided that he did not wish to contest such unfavourable territory and sought selection elsewhere. However he was unsuccessful in finding a new safe seat and thus retired at the 1997 general election.

=== 2010-2024 ===
Political history

The seat was tipped in mainstream newspapers to be likely to achieve the necessary notional swing based on the same area's votes in the previous election, in 2005, to fall to the Conservative candidate; however the seat fell short of the national average swing and was accordingly won by Karen Buck. The 2015 result gave the seat the 21st most marginal majority of Labour's 232 seats by percentage of majority. In the 2017 general election, Karen Buck increased her majority over Lindsey Hall, the Conservative Party candidate, from 1,977 to 11,512.

== Boundaries ==
=== 1983–1997 ===
The City of Westminster wards of: Bayswater; Church Street; Hamilton Terrace; Harrow Road; Lancaster Gate; Little Venice; Lords; (Note: This was one of several small wards, not shown in the 2010 post-revision (and pre-revision) map of the area, which was thus abolished before the Fifth review – the actual area around "Lords" remained squarely within the seat on the re-appearance of the constituency in 2010.) Maida Vale; Queen's Park; Regent's Park; and Westbourne.

Map of boundaries 2010-2024

=== 2010–2024 ===
The electoral wards of: Abbey Road; Bayswater; Church Street; Harrow Road; Lancaster Gate; Little Venice; Maida Vale; Queen's Park; Regent's Park; and Westbourne in the City of Westminster.

Parliament accepted the Boundary Commission's Fifth Periodic Review of Westminster constituencies which called for the recreation of this constituency for the 2010 general election. This was achieved from parts of two seats: the eastern three quarters of Regent's Park and Kensington North and northern parts of Cities of London and Westminster:

- Lancaster Gate ward (that part of Bayswater closest to Hyde Park)
- A major part of a shared ward next to this, Bayswater
- Loss of a minor part of a shared ward, Bryanston and Dorset Square, centred on Baker Street.

Population expansion across the former main seat was a factor, including Maida Vale, West Kilburn and to a lesser degree in St John's Wood, which were retained, as well as in Notting Hill and North Kensington, which were therefore removed.

== Members of Parliament ==
Election	Member	Party	Notes
1983	John Wheeler	Conservative	Knighted in 1993 (Note: Since January 1993 John Wheeler only has the title: Sir)
Constituency abolished in 1997
2010	Karen Buck	Labour	Member for main predecessor seat (1997–2010)

== Election results ==
=== Elections in the 2010s ===
General election 2019: Westminster North
Party	Candidate	Votes	%	±%
Labour	Karen Buck	23,240	54.2	–5.7
Conservative	Jamie Macfarlane	12,481	29.1	–4.2
Liberal Democrats	George Lee	5,593	13.0	+7.8
Green	Holly Robinson	1,064	2.5	+1.1
Brexit Party	Cyrus Parvin	418	1.0	New
CPA	Gabriela Fajardo Palacios	115	0.3	New
Majority		10,759	25.1	–1.5
Turnout		42,911	65.5	–2.3
Registered electors		65,519		
Labour hold		Swing	–0.7	

General election 2017: Westminster North
Party	Candidate	Votes	%	±%
Labour	Karen Buck	25,934	59.9	+13.1
Conservative	Lindsey Hall	14,422	33.3	−8.5
Liberal Democrats	Alex Harding	2,253	5.2	+1.5
Green	Emmanuelle Tandy	595	1.4	–1.9
Independent	Abby Dharamsey	91	0.2	New
Majority		11,512	26.6	+14.6
Turnout		43,295	67.8	+8.4
Registered electors		63,846		
Labour hold		Swing	+10.8	

General election 2015: Westminster North
Party	Candidate	Votes	%	±%
Labour	Karen Buck	18,504	46.8	+2.9
Conservative	Lindsey Hall	16,527	41.8	+3.3
UKIP	Nigel Sussman	1,489	3.8	+3.0
Liberal Democrats	Kirsty Allen	1,457	3.7	−10.2
Green	Jennifer Nadel	1,322	3.3	+2.1
Christian	Gabriela Fajardo	152	0.4	+0.2
Independent	Nicholas Ward	63	0.2	New
Majority		1,977	5.0	−0.4
Turnout		39,514	63.4	+4.1
Registered electors		62,346		
Labour hold		Swing	−0.2	

General election 2010: Westminster North
Party	Candidate	Votes	%	±%
Labour	Karen Buck	17,377	43.9	+3.4
Conservative	Joanne Cash	15,251	38.5	+5.3
Liberal Democrats	Mark Blackburn	5,513	13.9	–5.7
Green	Tristan Smith	478	1.2	N/a
BNP	Stephen Curry	334	0.8	N/a
UKIP	Jasna Badzak	315	0.8	N/a
Independent	Ali Bahaijoub	101	0.3	N/a
English Democrat	Edward Roseman	99	0.3	N/a
Christian	Gabriela Fajardo	98	0.2	N/a
Independent	Abdulla Dharamsey	32	0.1	N/a
Majority		2,126	5.4	–1.9
Turnout		39,598	59.3	+6.3
Registered electors		66,739		
Labour win (new seat)				

2005 notional result
Party	Vote	%
Labour	13,412	40.5
Conservative	11,018	33.3
Liberal Democrats	6,494	19.6
Others	2,210	6.7
Turnout	33,134	53.0
Electorate	62,463	

=== Elections 1983–1992 ===
General election 1992: Westminster North
Party	Candidate	Votes	%	±%
Conservative	John Wheeler	21,828	49.0	+1.6
Labour	Jennifer Edwards	18,095	40.6	+1.1
Liberal Democrats	Lewis Wigoder	3,349	7.5	−4.6
Green	Amelia Burke	1,017	2.3	+1.2
Natural Law	Jonathan Hinde	159	0.4	New
Anti-Federalist League	Michael Kelly	137	0.4	New
Majority		3,733	8.4	+0.5
Turnout		44,585	75.1	+4.0
Registered electors		59,405		
Conservative hold		Swing	+0.3	

General election 1987: Westminster North
Party	Candidate	Votes	%	±%
Conservative	John Wheeler	19,941	47.3	+4.1
Labour	Jennifer Edwards	16,631	39.5	+0.1
SDP	Richard De Ste Croix	5,116	12.1	−3.6
Green	David Stutchfield	450	1.1	−0.1
Majority		3,310	7.8	+4.0
Turnout		42,138	71.1	+6.8
Registered electors		59,363		
Conservative hold		Swing	+2.0	

General election 1983: Westminster North
Party	Candidate	Votes	%	±%
Conservative	John Wheeler	19,134	43.2	−3.8
Labour	Arthur Latham	17,424	39.4	−2.8
SDP	Thomas Halliwell	6,956	15.7	+7.1
Ecology	Timothy Cooper	527	1.2	New
Independent	Thomas Keen (Note: Used the description "Tactically Vote Conservative Annihilates Bennites Livingstonites")	148	0.3	New
Independent	Brian Fisher	73	0.2	New
Majority		1,710	3.8	−1.0
Turnout		44,262	64.2	
Registered electors		68,988		
Conservative win (new seat)				

1979 notional result
Party	Vote	%
Conservative	22,911	47.0
Labour	20,535	42.2
Liberal	4,177	8.6
Others	1,086	2.2
Turnout	48,709	
Electorate		

== See also ==
- Kensington (UK Parliament constituency)
- Cities of London and Westminster (UK Parliament constituency)
