= Cheshire East =

Borough in England

- Unitary authority area and borough
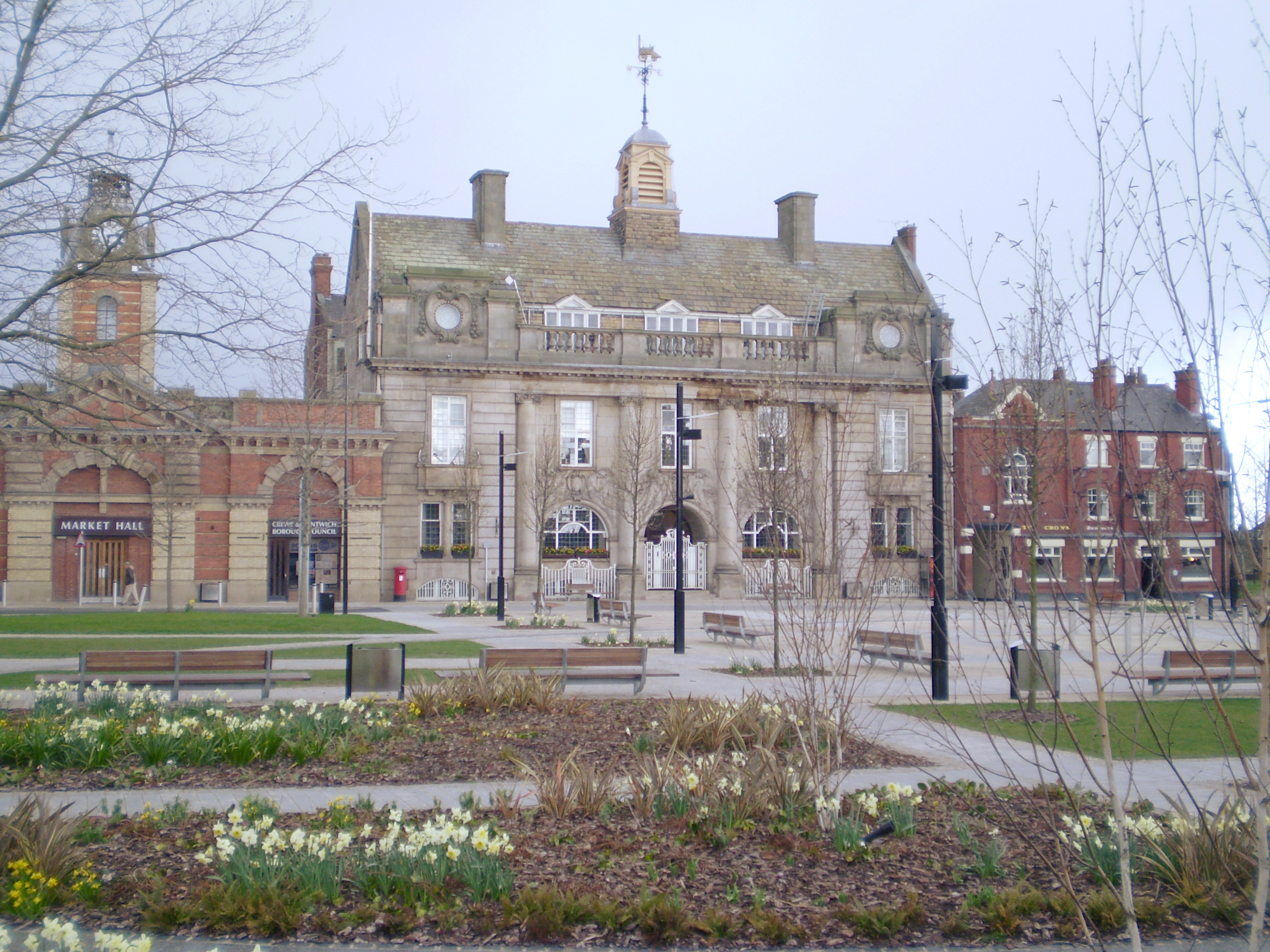
- Crewe, a historic railway town and the largest town in Cheshire East

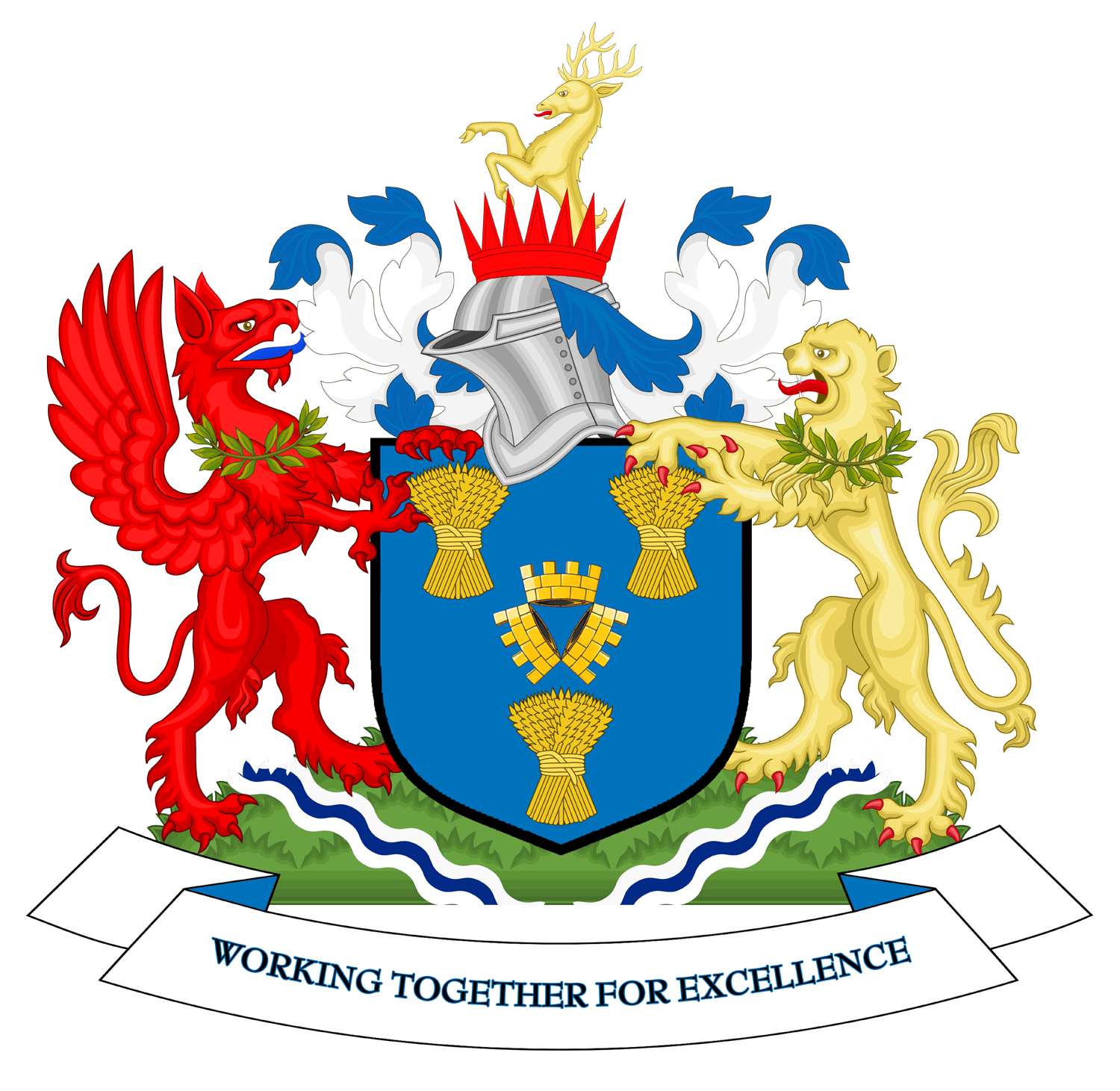
- Coat of arms
- Motto: Working together for excellence
- Cheshire East shown within Cheshire
- Coordinates: 53.146°N 2.367°W
- Sovereign state: United Kingdom
- Country: England
- Region: North West
- Ceremonial county: Cheshire
- Incorporated: 1 April 2009

Government
  - Type: Unitary authority
  - Body: Cheshire East Council
  - Executive: Leader and cabinet
  - Control: No overall control
  - Leader: Nick Mannion
  - Mayor: Judy Snowball
  - MPs: 6 MPs: Aphra Brandreth (C); Andrew Cooper (L); Esther McVey (C); Connor Naismith (L); Tim Roca (L); Sarah Russell (L)

Area
  - Total: 450 sq mi (1,166 km^{2})
  - Rank: 19th

Population (2025)
  - Total: 425,459
  - Rank: 16th
  - Density: 950/sq mi (365/km^{2})

Ethnicity (2021)
  - Ethnic groups: List: 94.4% White; 2.4% Asian; 1.8% Mixed; 0.6% Black; 0.8% other

Religion (2021)
  - Religion: List: 54.3% Christianity; 37.7% no religion; 1.0% Islam; 0.5% Hinduism; 0.3% Buddhism; 0.2% Judaism; 0.1% Sikhism; 0.4% other; 5.5% not stated
- Time zone: UTC+0 (GMT)
  - Summer (DST): UTC+1 (BST)
- Postcode areas: CW1–5; CW10–12; SK9–12; SK23; ST7; SY14; WA13–16
- Dialling codes: 01260; 01270; 01477; 01565; 01606; 01625; 01829; 01948
- ISO 3166 code: GB-CHE
- GSS code: E06000049
- Website: cheshireeast.gov.uk

Cheshire East is a unitary authority area with borough status in Cheshire, England. The local authority is Cheshire East Council. Towns within the area include Crewe, Macclesfield, Congleton, Wilmslow, Nantwich, Poynton, Knutsford, Alsager, Bollington, Handforth and Sandbach. It forms part of Cheshire and Warrington Combined Authority, along with neighbouring Cheshire West and Chester and Warrington.

== History ==
The borough council was established in April 2009 as part of the 2009 structural changes to local government in England, by virtue of an order under the Local Government and Public Involvement in Health Act 2007. It is an amalgamation of the former boroughs of Macclesfield, Congleton and Crewe and Nantwich, and includes the functions of the former Cheshire County Council. The residual part of the disaggregated former County Council, together with the other three former Cheshire borough councils (Chester City, Ellesmere Port & Neston and Vale Royal) were, similarly, amalgamated to create the new unitary council of Cheshire West and Chester.

Cheshire East has historic links to textile mills of the Industrial Revolution, such as seen at Quarry Bank Mill. It is also home to Tatton Park, a historic estate that hosts RHS Show Tatton Park.

In December 2024 Cheshire East council's headquarters in Sandbach closed.

== Geography ==
Cheshire East lies within North West England. It borders Cheshire West and Chester to the west, Greater Manchester to the north, Derbyshire to the east as well as Staffordshire and Shropshire to the south. It is home to the Cheshire Plain and the southern hills of the Pennines. The local geology is mostly glacial clay, as well as glacial sands and gravel.

=== Climate ===
According to the Köppen climate classification, like most areas of the UK, the climate is classified as “oceanic” or "Cfb".

== Demography ==
Historical population
Year	Pop.	±%
1981	328,500	—
1986	331,700	+1.0%
1991	340,500	+2.7%
1996	349,900	+2.8%
2001	352,100	+0.6%
2006	362,000	+2.8%
2011	370,700	+2.4%
2016	381,400	+2.9%
2021	400,500	+5.0%
All totals rounded to nearest hundred Source: NOMIS

The population of Cheshire East was 425,459 in 2025.

=== Ethnicity ===
According to the 2021 Census, ethnic white groups account for 94.4% of the population (376,543 people), with 5.6% of the population (22,229 people) being in ethnic groups other than white (Asian, Black, Mixed, Other).

=== Religion ===
A breakdown of religious groups:

- Christian: 54.3% (216,629 people)
- No religion: 37.7% (150,257 people)
- Muslim: 1.0% (4,140 people)
- Hindu: 0.5% (2,046 people)
- Buddhist: 0.3% (1,314 people)
- Jewish: 0.2% (640 people)
- Sikh: 0.1% (371 people)
- Other religions: 0.4% (1,558 people)
- Religion not stated: 5.5% (21,815 people)

== Administration ==
=== Wards ===
The 52 wards of Cheshire East are:

- Alderley Edge
- Alsager
- Audlem
- Bollington
- Brereton Rural
- Broken Cross and Upton
- Bunbury
- Chelford
- Congleton East
- Congleton West
- Crewe Central
- Crewe East
- Crewe North
- Crewe South
- Crewe St Barnabas
- Crewe West
- Dane Valley
- Disley
- Gawsworth
- Handforth
- Haslington
- High Legh
- Knutsford
- Leighton
- Macclesfield Central
- Macclesfield East
- Macclesfield Hurdsfield
- Macclesfield South
- Macclesfield Tytherington
- Macclesfield West and Ivy
- Middlewich
- Mobberley
- Nantwich North and West
- Nantwich South and Stapeley
- Odd Rode
- Poynton East and Pott Shrigley
- Poynton West and Adlington
- Prestbury
- Sandbach Elworth
- Sandbach Ettiley Heath and Wheelock
- Sandbach Heath and East
- Sandbach Town
- Shavington
- Sutton (Sutton Lane Ends)
- Willaston and Rope
- Wilmslow Dean Row
- Wilmslow East
- Wilmslow Lacey Green
- Wilmslow West and Chorley
- Wistaston
- Wrenbury
- Wybunbury

=== Members of Parliament ===
Constituency	Member of Parliament	Political party	Year first elected	Parliamentary profile
Chester South and Eddisbury	Aphra Brandreth	Conservative Party	2024	Profile
Congleton	Sarah Russell	Labour Party	2024	Profile
Crewe and Nantwich	Connor Naismith	Labour Party	2024	Profile
Macclesfield	Tim Roca	Labour Party	2024	Profile
Mid Cheshire	Andrew Cooper	Labour Party	2024	Profile
Tatton	Esther McVey	Conservative Party	2017	Profile

MPs in Cheshire East, 2008 onwards
Election	2008	2010	2015	2017	2019	2024
Chester South and Eddisbury						Aphra Brandreth
Congleton	Ann Winterton		Fiona Bruce			Sarah Russell
Crewe and Nantwich	Edward Timpson			Laura Smith	Kieran Mullan	Connor Naismith
Eddisbury	Stephen O'Brien			Antoinette Sandbach	Edward Timpson	
Macclesfield	Nicholas Winterton		David Rutley			Tim Roca
Mid Cheshire						Andrew Cooper
Tatton	George Osborne			Esther McVey		

Notes

1. 2: From the last election before the borough of Cheshire East was established.

== Elections ==
At the last Cheshire County Council election in 2005 there were 15 Conservative controlled wards, 6 Labour controlled wards, 5 Liberal Democrat controlled wards and 1 ward controlled by an independent within the unitary authority boundaries.

The first elections for Cheshire East Council took place on 1 May 2008, with the Conservative Party taking overall control. The Conservatives took 59 of the 81 seats with the others being held by the Liberal Democrats (12), Labour (6), 3 members of Middlewich First and one Independent. The first leader of the authority was Wesley Fitzgerald who was elected at Cheshire East's inaugural meeting on 13 May 2008. Wesley Fitzgerald is a Councillor for the Wilmslow South ward. Having decided in February 2012 to step down, a leadership contest was triggered. Michael Jones – a relatively new councillor having been elected in the May 2011 elections – was elected as the Leader of the Conservative Group on 17 March 2012.

Cheshire East is an observer member of the Association of Greater Manchester Authorities of Greater Manchester, which borders Cheshire to the north.

== Media ==
=== Television ===
The area is served by BBC North West and ITV Granada with television signals received from the Winter Hill TV transmitter.

=== Radio ===
Radio stations for the area are:

- BBC Radio Manchester (covering Wilmslow, Macclesfield and Knutsford)
- BBC Radio Stoke (covering Crewe, Nantwich and Congleton)
- Heart North West
- Smooth North West
- Capital North West & Wales
- Greatest Hits Radio Manchester & The North West
- Greatest Hits Radio Staffordshire & Cheshire
- Hits Radio Staffordshire & Cheshire
- Cheshire's Silk Radio

== Transport ==
=== Roads ===
Motorways and primary routes in the borough which are maintained by National Highways (trunk roads de jure) include the M6, M56 and the A556. Other primary routes are maintained by the council.

==== Major road projects ====
A556 Knutsford to Bowdon Improvement: A new 5-mile (8.0 km) four-lane dual-carriageway bypass of Bucklow Hill and Mere Crossroads on the A556 has been by Highways England at a cost of between £165-£221 million. The new road contains the first 'green bridge' wildlife crossing in the United Kingdom. The existing road has been narrowed to one lane in each direction and re-designated as the B5569 under the maintenance of Cheshire East Council.

M6 Junctions 16-19: Smart Motorway: Highways England are preparing to convert the hard shoulder to a permanent running lane and introduce a variable speed limit along this section of the M6. The scheme is expected to cost between £192-£274 million. However, in Spring 2023 the Government abandoned all plans for further Smart Motorways to be constructed following concerns regarding their safety.

Crewe Green Link Road South: A dual-carriageway extension of Crewe Green Link Road is being constructed between the A5020 and Weston Gate Roundabout on the A500 by Cheshire East Council at a cost of £26.5 million.

Cheshire East Council, for multiple years now, has been investing in LEDs (light emitting diodes).

=== Rail ===
Location of railway stations in Cheshire East.
White: East Midlands Railway stations; Blue: Northern Trains stations; Red: Avanti West Coast stations; Green: Transport for Wales stations

== Local sites of interest ==
The area is home to a large number of sites of public interest:

- Tatton Park is the venue for a variety of events: classical concerts; fireworks displays; classic car shows; open-air theatre and the Country Show (massed pipes and drums, sheepdog trials, competitions, crafts fair, and dancing).
- The Tatton Estate is privately owned with over 1,000 people living and working on it in town (Knutsford), in villages such as Rostherne and Ashley, and in the rural parishes surrounding. The new Ashley Hall Showground and Event Centre hosts events such as the Cheshire Ploughing and Hedge Laying Competition, the Ashley Hall Traction Engine Rally and charity barn dances.
- Jodrell Bank Observatory is home to a number of significant radio telescopes including the Lovell Telescope; and is involved in a range of international research projects such as MERLIN.
- Gawsworth Hall is a half-timbered hall, and possibly once home to Shakespeare's 'Dark Lady'. Concerts are held in the grounds, and each summer there is an open-air theatre season, featuring Shakespearean classics and light opera, comedy, jazz, and drama.
- Arley Hall is a Victorian-Jacobean Grade II listed country house, sometimes used as locations for filming. There have been two Coronation Street weddings filmed here.
- Quarry Bank Mill is set in the village of Styal and is a working water-mill and living museum.
- Capesthorne Hall is a Jacobean-style stately home which plays host to a variety of events.
- Alderley Edge is a great sandstone escarpment that overlooks the Cheshire plain. The Edge itself has been mined for copper since at least the time of the Roman invasion, and is the centre of the legend of the Wizard of Alderley, made famous by local author Alan Garner's books The Weirdstone of Brisingamen and The Moon of Gomrath. Nowadays it is said that the Wizard was Merlin, but this is an addition that only appeared over the past thirty years. Tours of the mines are available, but should not be attempted without an experienced guide – the Edge is riddled with mineshafts.
- St James' and St Paul's Church, Marton is a 14th-century house of worship which lies on an artificial mound or earthwork.
- Knutsford is best known as the site where King Canute forded the Lily Stream, and as the home of Victorian author Elizabeth Gaskell, and the town holds a May Day parade and festival every year.
- Lyme Park is an estate and park located near Disley. Lyme Hall is the principal feature of the park.
- Little Moreton Hall is one of the country's best-preserved half-timbered and moated manor houses.
- Sandbach Crosses are two Anglo-Saxon stone crosses now erected in the market place in the town of Sandbach, Cheshire, England . They are recognised as a Grade I listed building and a scheduled monument.
- Old Hall Hotel in Sandbach is a Grade I listed building. The Hall is on English Heritage's Buildings at Risk Register as priority A, this is the highest grading.

== Twin towns ==
The former borough of Macclesfield was twinned with Eckernförde, Germany.

Congleton has been twinned with Trappes since 16 September 1962

Twinning remains active in the Crewe and Nantwich area. The town of Crewe began twinning with the town of Mâcon in France in 1957. This continued when the borough of Crewe and Nantwich was formed in 1974. The borough added the town of Bischofsheim in Germany in 1991. In 2003 the administration of twinning was passed to CANTA, the Crewe and Nantwich Twinning Association, a voluntary association supported by the borough. The association immediately added Dzierżoniów in Poland as a Friendship Town. The association has received continuing support from Cheshire East after the borough became part of the new authority.

== Alderman and Freeman ==
The following is a list of people who have been either an alderman, alderwoman or freeman of Cheshire East, and when the title was bestowed.

- Roland Domleo (Alderman and Freeman)
