= List of United Kingdom MPs by seniority (2017–2019) =

This is the list of United Kingdom MPs by seniority, 2017–2019. The Members of Parliament (MPs) are ranked by the beginning of their terms in office, in the House of Commons.

The House of Commons of the 57th Parliament of the United Kingdom was elected on 8 June 2017, first met on 13 June 2017 and dissolved on 6 November 2019. The constituencies and party affiliations listed reflect those during the 57th Parliament. Seats and party affiliations for other Parliaments will be different for certain members.

This article describes the criteria for seniority in the House of Commons, as set out in Father of the House: a House of Commons background paper.

== Seniority criteria ==
The criteria for seniority, used in this article, are derived from the way that the Father of the House is selected. They are not laid down in Standing Orders but arise from the customary practice of the House of Commons.

The modern custom is that the Father of the House is the MP who has the longest continuous service. If two or more members were first elected in the same General Election (or at by-elections held on the same day), then priority is given to the one who was sworn in first. The order of swearing in is recorded in Hansard, the official record of proceedings.

When a member has had broken service, that does not affect his or her seniority (for the purpose of qualifying as the Father of the House) which is based on the latest period of continuous service.

The Sinn Féin members, who abstain from taking their seats at Westminster, have never been sworn in. They are ranked (in this list) after all other members who have taken their seats. Between themselves they are ranked by the first date of election, for the current period of continuous service. If they are equal on that criterion, then they are ranked in alphabetical order by surname.

In the House of Commons, the sole mandatory duty of the Father of the House is to preside over the election of a new Speaker whenever that office becomes vacant. The relevant Standing Order does not refer to this member by the title "Father of the House", referring instead to the longest-serving member of the House present who is not a Minister of the Crown (meaning that if the Father is absent or a government minister, the next person in line presides).

== Summary of Members elected by party ==
The following was the composition of the Commons at dissolution at 00:01, Wednesday 6 November 2019, when all 650 seats became vacant pending the 2019 United Kingdom general election.

Affiliation	Members		
Affiliation	After election	At dissolution	Change
The Speaker	1	1	Steady
Registered parliamentary parties
Conservative – Gov	317	298	▼19
Labour – OO	262	242	▼20
SNP	35	35	Steady
Liberal Democrats	12	20	▲8
DUP – C&S	10	10	Steady
Sinn Féin	7	7	Steady
Change UK	—N/a	5	▲5
Plaid Cymru	4	4	Steady
Green	1	1	Steady
Others
Independent	1	21	▲20
The Independents	—N/a	2	▲2
BSJP	—N/a	1	▲1
Suspended	—N/a	1	▲1
Vacant	—N/a	2	▲2
Total	650		Steady
Voting total	639	637	▼2
Safe majority	320	319	▼1
Gov short by	4	22	▲18
Gov + C&S total	326	307	▼19
Gov + C&S majority	13	-23	▼36

Notes

- For full details of changes during the 57th Parliament, see Defections and suspensions and By-elections.
- Labour, as the largest party not in government, took the role of Official Opposition (OO). The Co-operative Party was represented in the House of Commons by Labour MPs sitting with the Labour and Co-operative designation.
- "Members elected" refers to the composition resulting from the election on 8 June 2017, but note that the confidence and supply arrangement (C&S) was only reached on 26 June.
- The "voting total" is the effective size of the House excluding vacancies, suspensions, and certain members (ten at dissolution): the Speaker, two (usually three) Deputy Speakers (one Labour and one Conservative) who have only a tie-breaking vote constrained by conventions, and seven abstentionist members (Sinn Féin). This left relevant party voting totals as follows: Con 297, Lab 241, SF 0, Speaker 0.
- The "safe majority" (the number of seats needed to have a majority of one or two), "Gov short by" (the margin by which the governing Conservatives are short of that majority), and "Gov + C&S total" are based on the voting totals. The Conservative government entered into a confidence and supply agreement with the Democratic Unionist Party (DUP) to secure a small majority, which shrank due to defections, finally disappearing on 3 September 2019. Hence, the "Gov + C&S majority", calculated as the sum of voting Conservative and DUP members, less the sum of all other voting members, ended up negative.

== List of members of Parliament by seniority ==
This article assigns a numerical rank to each of the members elected in the 2017 general election and subsequent by-elections, except for those who were elected but never sworn in, who are displayed at the bottom without a number. Members named in italics and shaded in pink ceased to be MPs during the course of the parliament.

Rank	Member	Party	Constituency 2017	Elected	Date of birth	Notes
45th Parliament (elected: 18 June 1970, first met: 29 June 1970, dissolved: 8 February 1974)
001	The Rt Hon Kenneth Clarke	Ind	Rushcliffe	18 Jun 1970	2 Jul 1940	Father of the House; Former Chancellor of the Exchequer and Lord Chancellor among other Government and opposition briefs
002	Dennis Skinner	Lab	Bolsover	18 Jun 1970	11 Feb 1932	Former Chair of the Labour Party's NEC
47th Parliament (elected: 10 October 1974, first met: 22 October 1974, dissolved: 7 April 1979)
003	Sir Peter Bottomley	C	Worthing West	26 Jun 1975	30 Jul 1944	Former junior minister in the departments of Work and Pensions, Northern Ireland Office and Transport
004	Geoffrey Robinson	Lab	Coventry North West	4 Mar 1976	25 May 1938	Former Paymaster General
48th Parliament (elected: 3 May 1979, first met: 9 May 1979, dissolved: 13 May 1983)
005	Barry Sheerman	Lab	Huddersfield	3 May 1979	17 Aug 1940	Former Chair of the Education Select Committee and Shadow Minister of State for Social Security
006	The Rt Hon Frank Field	Ind	Birkenhead	3 May 1979	16 Jul 1942	Former Minister for Welfare Reform and incumbent Chairman of the Work and Pensions Select Committee
007	The Rt Hon Harriet Harman	Lab	Camberwell and Peckham	28 Oct 1982	30 Jul 1950	Longest-ever continuously-serving female MP. Former Acting Lab Leader and Leader of the Opposition 2010 and 2015
49th Parliament (elected: 9 June 1983, first met: 15 June 1983, dissolved: 18 May 1987)
008	The Rt Hon Sir Kevin Barron	Lab	Rother Valley	9 Jun 1983	26 Oct 1946	
009	The Rt Hon Sir Edward Leigh	C	Gainsborough	9 Jun 1983	20 Jul 1950	
010	The Rt Hon Nick Brown	Lab	Newcastle upon Tyne East	9 Jun 1983	13 Jun 1950	Chief Whip, Lab 6 Oct 2016 – present
011	The Rt Hon Jeremy Corbyn	Lab	Islington North	9 Jun 1983	26 May 1949	Labour Party Leader and Leader of the Opposition 12 Sep 2015 – present
012	Sir David Amess	C	Southend West	9 Jun 1983	26 Mar 1952	
013	The Rt Hon Sir Roger Gale	C	North Thanet	9 Jun 1983	20 Aug 1943	
014	The Rt Hon Sir Nicholas Soames	C	Mid Sussex	9 Jun 1983	12 Feb 1948	Child of late life peer Lord Soames
015	The Rt Hon Dame Margaret Beckett	Lab	Derby South	9 Jun 1983	15 Jan 1943	Longest-ever non-continuously-serving female MP. Previously served 1974–79, Former Acting Lab Leader and Leader of the Opposition 1994
016	Sir Bill Cash	C	Stone	3 Jun 1984	10 May 1940	
017	The Rt Hon Ann Clwyd	Lab	Cynon Valley	3 Jun 1984	21 Mar 1937	
018	The Rt Hon Sir Patrick McLoughlin	C	Derbyshire Dales	8 May 1986	30 Nov 1957	Chairman of the Conservative Party & Chancellor of the Duchy of Lancaster 2017–18
019	The Rt Hon Sir George Howarth	Lab	Knowsley	13 Nov 1986	29 Jun 1949	
50th Parliament (elected: 11 June 1987, first met: 17 June 1987, dissolved: 16 March 1992)
020	The Rt Hon Sir John Redwood	C	Wokingham	11 Jun 1987	15 Jun 1951	Leadership challenger to John Major in 1995
021	Ronnie Campbell	Lab	Blyth Valley	11 Jun 1987	14 Aug 1943	
022	The Rt Hon David Davis	C	Haltemprice and Howden	11 Jun 1987	23 Dec 1948	
023	David Tredinnick	C	Bosworth	11 Jun 1987	19 Jan 1950	
024	The Rt Hon Keith Vaz	Lab	Leicester East	11 Jun 1987	26 Nov 1956	Former Chair of the Home Affairs Select Committee
025	Paul Flynn	Lab	Newport West	11 Jun 1987	9 Feb 1935	Died 17 February 2019
026	The Rt Hon Diane Abbott	Lab	Hackney North and Stoke Newington	11 Jun 1987	27 Sep 1953	Shadow Home Secretary
027	Kate Hoey	Lab	Vauxhall	15 Jun 1989	21 Jun 1946	
51st Parliament (elected: 9 April 1992, first met: 27 April 1992, dissolved: 8 April 1997)
028	Jim Cunningham	Lab	Coventry South	9 Apr 1992	4 Feb 1941	
029	Richard Burden	Lab	Birmingham, Northfield	9 Apr 1992	1 Sep 1954	
030	The Rt Hon Liam Fox	C	North Somerset	9 Apr 1992	22 Sep 1961	Secretary of State for International Trade & President of the Board of Trade; former Secretary of State for Defence
031	The Rt Hon Sir David Lidington	C	Aylesbury	9 Apr 1992	30 Jun 1956	Secretary of State for Justice & Lord Chancellor 2017–18; Chancellor of the Duchy of Lancaster & Minister for the Cabinet Office 2018–
032	The Rt Hon Sir Oliver Heald	C	North East Hertfordshire	9 Apr 1992	15 Dec 1954	
033	Sir Geoffrey Clifton-Brown	C	The Cotswolds	9 Apr 1992	23 Mar 1953	
034	The Rt Hon David Hanson	Lab	Delyn	9 Apr 1992	5 Jul 1957	
035	Sir Gary Streeter	C	South West Devon	9 Apr 1992	2 Oct 1955	
036	Michael Fabricant	C	Lichfield	9 Apr 1992	12 Jun 1950	
037	Clive Betts	Lab	Sheffield South East	9 Apr 1992	13 Jan 1950	
038	Ann Coffey	CHUK	Stockport	9 Apr 1992	31 Aug 1946	
039	The Rt Hon Sir Alan Duncan	C	Rutland and Melton	9 Apr 1992	31 Mar 1957	
040	Sir Paul Beresford	C	Mole Valley	9 Apr 1992	6 Apr 1946	
041	The Rt Hon Iain Duncan Smith	C	Chingford and Woodford Green	9 Apr 1992	9 Apr 1954	Former Secretary of State for Work and Pensions & Leader of the Opposition
042	Mike Gapes	CHUK	Ilford South	9 Apr 1992	4 Sep 1952	
043	Nigel Evans	C	Ribble Valley	9 Apr 1992	10 Nov 1957	Former First Deputy Chair of Ways and Means
044	The Rt Hon Dame Cheryl Gillan	C	Chesham and Amersham	9 Apr 1992	21 Apr 1952	Former Secretary of State for Wales
045	The Hon Sir Bernard Jenkin	C	Harwich and North Essex	9 Apr 1992	9 Apr 1959	Child of late life peer Lord Jenkin of Roding
046	Angela Eagle	Lab	Wallasey	9 Apr 1992	17 Feb 1961	Held Various Shadow Cabinet positions prior to an unsuccessful challenge for the Labour Leadership
047	The Rt Hon John Whittingdale	C	Maldon	9 Apr 1992	16 Oct 1959	Former Secretary of State for Culture, Media and Sport
048	The Rt Hon John Spellar	Lab	Warley	9 Apr 1992	5 Aug 1947	Previously served 1982–83
049	Roger Godsiff	Lab	Birmingham Hall Green	9 Apr 1992	28 Jun 1946	
050	The Rt Hon Dame Margaret Hodge	Lab	Barking	9 Jun 1994	8 Sep 1944	Former Chair of the Public Accounts Committee
051	The Rt Hon Stephen Timms	Lab	East Ham	9 Jun 1994	29 Jul 1955	
052	Jon Trickett	Lab	Hemsworth	1 Feb 1996	2 Jul 1950	Shadow Lord President of the Council
52nd Parliament (elected: 1 May 1997, first met: 7 May 1997, dissolved: 14 May 2001)
053	The Rt Hon Keith Simpson	C	Broadland	1 May 1997	29 Mar 1949	
054	The Rt Hon Julian Lewis	C	New Forest East	1 May 1997	26 Sep 1951	Chair of the Defence Select Committee
055	The Rt Hon Owen Paterson	C	North Shropshire	1 May 1997	24 Jun 1956	Former Secretary of State for Environment, Food and Rural Affairs & Secretary of State for Northern Ireland
056	Laurence Robertson	C	Tewkesbury	1 May 1997	29 Mar 1958	
057	Sir Robert Syms	C	Poole	1 May 1997	15 Aug 1956	
058	The Rt Hon Ben Bradshaw	Lab	Exeter	1 May 1997	30 Aug 1960	Former Secretary of State for Culture, Media and Sport
059	Helen Jones	Lab	Warrington North	1 May 1997	24 Dec 1954	
060	Jim Fitzpatrick	Lab	Poplar and Limehouse	1 May 1997	4 Apr 1952	
061	The Rt Hon Sir Jeffrey Donaldson	DUP	Lagan Valley	1 May 1997	7 Dec 1962	
062	The Rt Hon John McDonnell	Lab	Hayes and Harlington	1 May 1997	8 Sep 1951	Shadow Chancellor of the Exchequer
063	Gareth Thomas	Lab	Harrow West	1 May 1997	15 Jul 1967	
064	The Rt Hon Dame Eleanor Laing	C	Epping Forest	1 May 1997	1 Feb 1958	Deputy Speaker:1st Dep. Ch., Ways and Means
065	Stephen Pound	Lab	Ealing North	1 May 1997	3 Jul 1948	
066	The Rt Hon Sir Lindsay Hoyle	Spe	Chorley	1 May 1997	10 Jun 1957	Deputy Speaker: Chairman, Ways and Means (to 4 November 2019); Speaker (from 4 November 2019)
067	The Rt Hon John Healey	Lab	Wentworth and Dearne	1 May 1997	13 Feb 1960	Shadow Secretary of State for Housing
068	Dame Louise Ellman	Ind	Liverpool Riverside	1 May 1997	14 Nov 1945	
069	The Rt Hon Philip Hammond	Ind	Runnymede and Weybridge	1 May 1997	4 Dec 1955	Former Chancellor of the Exchequer
070	Tim Loughton	C	East Worthing and Shoreham	1 May 1997	30 May 1962	
071	The Rt Hon Tom Brake	LD	Carshalton and Wallington	1 May 1997	6 May 1962	LD Exiting the European Union, International Trade and First Secretary of State Spokesperson
072	Kelvin Hopkins	Lab	Luton North	1 May 1997	22 Aug 1941	Whip suspended and sat as Independent from 2 Nov 2017
073	The Rt Hon Theresa May	C	Maidenhead	1 May 1997	1 Oct 1956	Leader of the Conservatives 11 Jul 2016 – 23 July 2019 & Prime Minister 13 Jul 2016 – 24 Jul 2019.
074	The Rt Hon Sir Graham Brady	C	Altrincham and Sale West	1 May 1997	20 May 1967	
075	The Rt Hon John Bercow	Spe	Buckingham	1 May 1997	19 Jan 1963	Speaker; Retired as speaker and resigned his seat on 4 November 2019
076	The Rt Hon Nick Gibb	C	Bognor Regis and Littlehampton	1 May 1997	3 Sep 1960	
077	Stephen Hepburn	Lab	Jarrow	1 May 1997	6 Dec 1959	
078	Alan Whitehead	Lab	Southampton Test	1 May 1997	15 Sep 1950	
079	Barry Gardiner	Lab	Brent North	1 May 1997	10 Mar 1957	Shadow Secretary of State for International Trade
080	The Rt Hon Caroline Flint	Lab	Don Valley	1 May 1997	20 Sep 1961	
081	The Rt Hon Dominic Grieve	Ind	Beaconsfield	1 May 1997	24 May 1956	
082	Sir David Crausby	Lab	Bolton North East	1 May 1997	17 Jun 1946	
083	The Rt Hon Sir Desmond Swayne	C	New Forest West	1 May 1997	20 Aug 1956	
084	Fabian Hamilton	Lab	Leeds North East	1 May 1997	12 Apr 1955	
085	The Rt Hon Dame Caroline Spelman	C	Meriden	1 May 1997	4 May 1958	
086	The Rt Hon Sir Michael Fallon	C	Sevenoaks	1 May 1997	14 May 1952	Previously served 1983–92. Secretary of State for Defence 2014–17.
087	The Rt Hon Damian Green	C	Ashford	1 May 1997	17 Jan 1956	First Secretary of State & Minister for the Cabinet Office 2017
088	James Gray	C	North Wiltshire	1 May 1997	7 Nov 1954	
089	The Rt Hon Sir Alan Campbell	Lab	Tynemouth	1 May 1997	8 Jul 1957	
090	Maria Eagle	Lab	Garston and Halewood	1 May 1997	17 Feb 1961	
091	The Rt Hon Dame Rosie Winterton	Lab	Doncaster Central	1 May 1997	10 Aug 1958	Former Chief Whip, Lab. Deputy Speaker:2nd Dep. Ch., Ways and Means.
092	Ivan Lewis	Ind	Bury South	1 May 1997	4 Mar 1967	Whip suspended and sat as Independent from 23 Nov 2017
093	Gordon Marsden	Lab	Blackpool South	1 May 1997	28 Nov 1953	
094	Clive Efford	Lab	Eltham	1 May 1997	10 Jul 1958	
095	Karen Buck	Lab	Westminster North	1 May 1997	30 Aug 1958	
096	Steve McCabe	Lab	Birmingham Selly Oak	1 May 1997	4 Aug 1955	
097	Graham Stringer	Lab	Blackley and Broughton	1 May 1997	17 Feb 1950	
098	The Rt Hon Sir John Hayes	C	South Holland and The Deepings	1 May 1997	23 Jun 1958	
099	The Rt Hon Sir Oliver Letwin	Ind	West Dorset	1 May 1997	19 May 1956	
100	The Rt Hon Yvette Cooper	Lab	Normanton, Pontefract and Castleford	1 May 1997	20 Mar 1969	
101	Vernon Coaker	Lab	Gedling	1 May 1997	17 Jun 1953	
102	Crispin Blunt	C	Reigate	1 May 1997	15 Jul 1960	
103	Derek Twigg	Lab	Halton	1 May 1997	9 Jul 1959	
104	Siobhain McDonagh	Lab	Mitcham and Morden	1 May 1997	20 Feb 1960	
105	Sir Christopher Chope	C	Christchurch	1 May 1997	19 May 1947	Previously served 1983–92
106	The Rt Hon Hilary Benn	Lab	Leeds Central	10 Jun 1999	26 Nov 1953	Child of the late Tony Benn, a disclaimed hereditary peer
107	The Rt Hon David Lammy	Lab	Tottenham	22 Jun 2000	19 Jul 1972	
108	Sir Mark Hendrick	Lab	Preston	23 Nov 2000	2 Nov 1958	
109	Adrian Bailey	Lab	West Bromwich West	23 Nov 2000	11 Dec 1945	
53rd Parliament (elected: 7 June 2001, first met: 13 June 2001, dissolved: 11 April 2005)
110	The Rt Hon Sir Greg Knight	C	East Yorkshire	7 Jun 2001	4 Apr 1949	Previously served 1983–97
111	Richard Bacon	C	South Norfolk	7 Jun 2001	3 Dec 1962	
112	The Rt Hon Nigel Dodds	DUP	Belfast North	7 Jun 2001	20 Aug 1958	Parliamentary group leader: DUP
113	Gregory Campbell	DUP	East Londonderry	7 Jun 2001	15 Feb 1953	
114	Bill Wiggin	C	North Herefordshire	7 Jun 2001	4 Jun 1966	
115	Andrew Rosindell	C	Romford	7 Jun 2001	17 Mar 1966	
116	Kevin Brennan	Lab	Cardiff West	7 Jun 2001	16 Oct 1959	
117	Wayne David	Lab	Caerphilly	7 Jun 2001	1 Jul 1957	
118	The Rt Hon Chris Grayling	C	Epsom and Ewell	7 Jun 2001	1 Apr 1962	Secretary of State for Transport
119	Jon Cruddas	Lab	Dagenham and Rainham	7 Jun 2001	7 Apr 1962	
120	Tom Watson	Lab	West Bromwich East	7 Jun 2001	8 Jan 1967	Deputy Leader, Lab and Shadow Secretary of State for Culture, Media and Sport
121	John Mann	Lab	Bassetlaw	7 Jun 2001	10 Jan 1960	
122	The Rt Hon Kevan Jones	Lab	North Durham	7 Jun 2001	25 Apr 1964	
123	The Rt Hon Alistair Carmichael	LD	Orkney and Shetland	7 Jun 2001	15 Jul 1965	Liberal Democrat Chief Whip. LD Northern Ireland Spokesperson.
124	John Baron	C	Basildon and Billericay	7 Jun 2001	21 Jun 1959	
125	Mark Prisk	C	Hertford and Stortford	7 Jun 2001	12 Jun 1962	
126	The Rt Hon Mark Francois	C	Rayleigh and Wickford	7 Jun 2001	14 Aug 1965	
127	Andrew Selous	C	South West Bedfordshire	7 Jun 2001	27 Apr 1962	
128	The Rt Hon Sir Hugo Swire	C	East Devon	7 Jun 2001	30 Nov 1959	
129	Khalid Mahmood	Lab	Birmingham Perry Barr	7 Jun 2001	13 Jul 1961	
130	The Rt Hon Mark Field	C	Cities of London and Westminster	7 Jun 2001	6 Oct 1964	
131	Sir Henry Bellingham	C	North West Norfolk	7 Jun 2001	29 Mar 1955	Previously served 1983–97
132	Paul Farrelly	Lab	Newcastle-under-Lyme	7 Jun 2001	2 Mar 1962	
133	Jonathan Djanogly	C	Huntingdon	7 Jun 2001	3 Jun 1965	
134	The Rt Hon Andrew Murrison	C	South West Wiltshire	7 Jun 2001	24 Apr 1961	
135	Ian Liddell-Grainger	C	Bridgwater and West Somerset	7 Jun 2001	23 Feb 1959	
136	Ian Lucas	Lab	Wrexham	7 Jun 2001	18 Sep 1960	
137	Sylvia, Lady Hermon	Ind	North Down	7 Jun 2001	11 Aug 1955	Widow of a knight
138	The Rt Hon Mark Tami	Lab	Alyn and Deeside	7 Jun 2001	3 Oct 1962	
139	The Rt Hon Sir Norman Lamb	LD	North Norfolk	7 Jun 2001	16 Sep 1957	LD Health Spokesperson.
140	Hywel Williams	PC	Arfon	7 Jun 2001	14 May 1953	Former Parliamentary group leader, PC
141	The Rt Hon Alistair Burt	C	North East Bedfordshire	7 Jun 2001	25 May 1955	Previously served 1983–97
142	Albert Owen	Lab	Ynys Môn	7 Jun 2001	10 Aug 1959	
143	Chris Bryant	Lab	Rhondda	7 Jun 2001	11 Jan 1962	
144	Pete Wishart	SNP	Perth and North Perthshire	7 Jun 2001	9 Mar 1962	
145	The Rt Hon Andrew Mitchell	C	Sutton Coldfield	7 Jun 2001	23 Mar 1956	Previously served 1987–97
146	The Rt Hon Liam Byrne	Lab	Birmingham Hodge Hill	15 Jul 2004	2 Oct 1970	
54th Parliament (elected: 5 May 2005, first met: 11 May 2005, dissolved: 12 April 2010)
147	David Simpson	DUP	Upper Bann	5 May 2005	16 Feb 1959	
148	Sir Charles Walker	C	Broxbourne	5 May 2005	11 Sep 1967	
149	The Rt Hon Tobias Ellwood	C	Bournemouth East	5 May 2005	12 Aug 1966	
150	Adam Afriyie	C	Windsor	5 May 2005	4 Aug 1965	
151	Tim Farron	LD	Westmorland and Lonsdale	5 May 2005	27 May 1970	Leader, LD 16 July 2015 –2017
152	The Rt Hon Anne Milton	Ind	Guildford	5 May 2005	3 Nov 1955	
153	Anne Main	C	St Albans	5 May 2005	17 May 1957	
154	The Rt Hon Sir David Evennett	C	Bexleyheath and Crayford	5 May 2005	3 Jun 1949	Previously served 1983–97
155	Stewart Hosie	SNP	Dundee East	5 May 2005	3 Jan 1963	Former Parliamentary group deputy leader, SNP
156	The Rt Hon Grant Shapps	C	Welwyn Hatfield	5 May 2005	14 Sep 1968	
157	The Rt Hon Sir Mike Penning	C	Hemel Hempstead	5 May 2005	28 Sep 1957	
158	The Rt Hon Nick Hurd	C	Ruislip, Northwood and Pinner	5 May 2005	13 May 1962	Child of life peer Lord Hurd of Westwell
159	Daniel Kawczynski	C	Shrewsbury and Atcham	5 May 2005	24 Jan 1972	
160	The Rt Hon Justine Greening	Ind	Putney	5 May 2005	30 Apr 1969	Former Education Secretary
161	The Rt Hon Jeremy Wright	C	Kenilworth and Southam	5 May 2005	24 Oct 1972	Secretary of State for Digital, Culture, Media and Sport
162	James Duddridge	C	Rochford and Southend East	5 May 2005	26 Aug 1971	
163	The Rt Hon James Brokenshire	C	Old Bexley and Sidcup	5 May 2005	7 Jan 1968	Secretary of State for Housing, Communities and Local Government
164	Philip Hollobone	C	Kettering	5 May 2005	7 Nov 1964	
165	The Rt Hon Theresa Villiers	C	Chipping Barnet	5 May 2005	5 Mar 1968	
166	Peter Bone	C	Wellingborough	5 May 2005	19 Oct 1952	
167	The Rt Hon David Gauke	Ind	South West Hertfordshire	5 May 2005	8 Oct 1971	Secretary of State for Justice & Lord Chancellor
168	The Rt Hon Nick Herbert	C	Arundel and South Downs	5 May 2005	7 Apr 1963	
169	The Rt Hon Mark Harper	C	Forest of Dean	5 May 2005	26 Feb 1970	Former Chief Whip, C
170	The Rt Hon David Mundell	C	Dumfriesshire, Clydesdale and Tweeddale	5 May 2005	27 May 1962	Secretary of State for Scotland
171	Madeleine Moon	Lab	Bridgend	5 May 2005	27 Mar 1950	
172	John Penrose	C	Weston-Super-Mare	5 May 2005	22 Jun 1964	
173	Mark Pritchard	C	The Wrekin	5 May 2005	22 Nov 1966	
174	The Rt Hon Maria Miller	C	Basingstoke	5 May 2005	26 Mar 1964	
175	Shailesh Vara	C	North West Cambridgeshire	5 May 2005	4 Sep 1960	
176	The Rt Hon Richard Benyon	C	Newbury	5 May 2005	21 Oct 1960	
177	The Rt Hon Mark Lancaster	C	Milton Keynes North	5 May 2005	12 May 1970	
178	The Rt Hon Greg Hands	C	Chelsea and Fulham	5 May 2005	14 Nov 1965	
179	The Rt Hon Ben Wallace	C	Wyre and Preston North	5 May 2005	15 May 1970	
180	The Rt Hon Jeremy Hunt	C	South West Surrey	5 May 2005	1 Nov 1966	Secretary of State for Foreign and Commonwealth Affairs
181	David Davies	C	Monmouth	5 May 2005	22 Jul 1970	
182	The Rt Hon David Jones	C	Clwyd West	5 May 2005	22 Mar 1952	
183	Lyn Brown	Lab	West Ham	5 May 2005	13 Apr 1960	
184	Philip Davies	C	Shipley	5 May 2005	5 Jan 1972	
185	Stephen Hammond	C	Wimbledon	5 May 2005	4 Feb 1962	
186	The Rt Hon Ed Vaizey	C	Wantage	5 May 2005	5 Jun 1968	Child of late life peer Lord Vaizey
187	Andrew Gwynne	Lab	Denton and Reddish	5 May 2005	4 Jun 1974	Shadow Secretary of State for Communities and Local Government
188	The Rt Hon Stephen Crabb	C	Preseli Pembrokeshire	5 May 2005	20 Jan 1973	
189	Mary Creagh	Lab	Wakefield	5 May 2005	2 Dec 1967	
190	Helen Goodman	Lab	Bishop Auckland	5 May 2005	2 Jan 1958	
191	The Rt Hon Pat McFadden	Lab	Wolverhampton South East	5 May 2005	26 Mar 1965	
192	Meg Hillier	Lab	Hackney South and Shoreditch	5 May 2005	14 Feb 1969	
193	The Rt Hon Sammy Wilson	DUP	East Antrim	5 May 2005	4 Apr 1953	
194	The Rt Hon Robert Goodwill	C	Scarborough and Whitby	5 May 2005	31 Dec 1956	
195	Adam Holloway	C	Gravesham	5 May 2005	29 Jul 1965	
196	Roberta Blackman-Woods	Lab	City of Durham	5 May 2005	16 Aug 1957	
197	The Rt Hon Greg Clark	C	Tunbridge Wells	5 May 2005	28 Aug 1967	Secretary of State for Business, Energy and Industrial Strategy
198	The Rt Hon Michael Gove	C	Surrey Heath	5 May 2005	26 Aug 1967	Secretary of State for Environment, Food and Rural Affairs
199	Angela Smith	LD	Penistone and Stocksbridge	5 May 2005	16 Aug 1961	
200	Kerry McCarthy	Lab	Bristol East	5 May 2005	26 Mar 1965	
201	Jessica Morden	Lab	Newport East	5 May 2005	29 May 1968	
202	Diana Johnson	Lab	Kingston upon Hull North	5 May 2005	25 Jul 1966	
203	Graham Stuart	C	Beverley and Holderness	5 May 2005	12 Mar 1962	
204	Nadine Dorries	C	Mid Bedfordshire	5 May 2005	21 May 1957	
205	The Rt Hon Emily Thornberry	Lab	Islington South and Finsbury	5 May 2005	27 Jul 1960	Shadow Secretary of State for Foreign and Commonwealth Affairs
206	Barbara Keeley	Lab	Worsley and Eccles South	5 May 2005	26 Mar 1952	Shadow Minister for Mental Health and Social Care
207	Sharon Hodgson	Lab	Washington and Sunderland West	5 May 2005	1 Apr 1966	
208	The Rt Hon Geoffrey Cox	C	Torridge and West Devon	5 May 2005	30 Apr 1960	
209	Andy Slaughter	Lab	Hammersmith	5 May 2005	29 Sep 1960	
210	The Rt Hon Ed Miliband	Lab	Doncaster North	5 May 2005	24 Dec 1969	Leader, Lab and Leader of the Opposition 25 September 2010 – 8 May 2015
211	Ian Austin	Ind	Dudley North	5 May 2005	6 Mar 1965	
212	The Rt Hon Philip Dunne	C	Ludlow	5 May 2005	14 Aug 1958	
213	Angus MacNeil	SNP	Na h-Eileanan an Iar	5 May 2005	21 Jul 1970	
214	Rosie Cooper	Lab	West Lancashire	5 May 2005	5 Sep 1950	
215	Nia Griffith	Lab	Llanelli	5 May 2005	4 Dec 1956	Shadow Secretary of State for Defence
216	Bob Neill	C	Bromley and Chislehurst	29 Jun 2006	24 Jun 1952	
217	Virendra Sharma	Lab	Ealing Southall	19 Jul 2007	5 Apr 1947	
218	Phil Wilson	Lab	Sedgefield	19 Jul 2007	31 May 1959	
219	John Howell	C	Henley	26 Jun 2008	27 Jul 1955	
220	Chloe Smith	C	Norwich North	23 Jul 2009	17 May 1982	
55th Parliament (elected: 6 May 2010, first met: 18 May 2010, dissolved: 30 March 2015)
221	The Rt Hon Valerie Vaz	Lab	Walsall South	6 May 2010	7 Dec 1954	Shadow Leader of the House of Commons
222	Chris Leslie	CHUK	Nottingham East	6 May 2010	28 Jun 1972	Previously served 1997–2005
223	Catherine McKinnell	Lab	Newcastle upon Tyne North	6 May 2010	8 Jun 1976	
224	The Rt Hon Rory Stewart	Ind	Penrith and The Border	6 May 2010	3 Jan 1973	
225	Bob Stewart	C	Beckenham	6 May 2010	7 Jul 1949	
226	Chris Heaton-Harris	C	Daventry	6 May 2010	28 Nov 1967	
227	Iain Stewart	C	Milton Keynes South	6 May 2010	18 Sep 1972	
228	Andrew Bridgen	C	North West Leicestershire	6 May 2010	28 Oct 1964	
229	Nigel Mills	C	Amber Valley	6 May 2010	28 Oct 1974	
230	Neil Parish	C	Tiverton and Honiton	6 May 2010	26 May 1956	
231	Jack Lopresti	C	Filton and Bradley Stoke	6 May 2010	23 Aug 1969	
232	Jonathan Reynolds	Lab	Stalybridge and Hyde	6 May 2010	28 Aug 1980	
233	Simon Hart	C	Carmarthen West and South Pembrokeshire	6 May 2010	15 Aug 1963	
234	Martin Vickers	C	Cleethorpes	6 May 2010	13 Sep 1950	
235	Geraint Davies	Lab	Swansea West	6 May 2010	3 May 1960	Previously served 1997–2005
236	John Cryer	Lab	Leyton and Wanstead	6 May 2010	11 Apr 1964	Previously served 1997–2005
237	The Rt Hon Priti Patel	C	Witham	6 May 2010	29 Mar 1972	Secretary of State for the Home Department
238	Charlie Elphicke	Ind	Dover	6 May 2010	14 Mar 1971	Whip suspended and sat as Independent from 3 Nov 2017
239	The Rt Hon Alec Shelbrooke	C	Elmet and Rothwell	6 May 2010	10 Jan 1976	
240	Nigel Adams	C	Selby and Ainsty	6 May 2010	30 Nov 1966	
241	Sam Gyimah	LD	East Surrey	6 May 2010	10 Aug 1976	
242	The Rt Hon Mel Stride	C	Central Devon	6 May 2010	30 Sep 1961	
243	The Rt Hon Claire Perry	C	Devizes	6 May 2010	3 Apr 1964	
244	The Rt Hon Damian Hinds	C	East Hampshire	6 May 2010	27 Nov 1969	
245	Guto Bebb	Ind	Aberconwy	6 May 2010	9 Oct 1968	
246	The Rt Hon Anna Soubry	CHUK	Broxtowe	6 May 2010	7 Dec 1956	
247	The Rt Hon Mark Spencer	C	Sherwood	6 May 2010	20 Jan 1970	
248	Ian Lavery	Lab	Wansbeck	6 May 2010	6 Jan 1963	Shadow Minister for the Cabinet Office
249	Grahame Morris	Lab	Easington	6 May 2010	13 Mar 1961	
250	Ian Mearns	Lab	Gateshead	6 May 2010	21 Apr 1957	
251	Richard Harrington	C	Watford	6 May 2010	4 Nov 1957	
252	The Rt Hon Sajid Javid	C	Bromsgrove	6 May 2010	5 Dec 1969	Chancellor of the Exchequer
253	The Rt Hon Robert Halfon	C	Harlow	6 May 2010	22 Mar 1969	
254	John Glen	C	Salisbury	6 May 2010	1 Apr 1974	
255	Andrew Griffiths	C	Burton	6 May 2010	19 Oct 1970	
256	The Rt Hon Jesse Norman	C	Hereford and South Herefordshire	6 May 2010	23 Jun 1962	
257	David Morris	C	Morecambe and Lunesdale	6 May 2010	3 Jan 1966	
258	Richard Drax	C	South Dorset	6 May 2010	29 Jan 1958	
259	Bob Blackman	C	Harrow East	6 May 2010	26 Apr 1956	
260	Fiona Bruce	C	Congleton	6 May 2010	26 Mar 1957	
261	Sarah Wollaston	LD	Totnes	6 May 2010	17 Feb 1962	
262	Dan Poulter	C	Central Suffolk and North Ipswich	6 May 2010	30 Oct 1978	
263	Tracey Crouch	C	Chatham and Aylesford	6 May 2010	24 Jul 1975	
264	Mary Glindon	Lab	North Tyneside	6 May 2010	13 Jan 1957	
265	Julie Elliott	Lab	Sunderland Central	6 May 2010	29 Jul 1963	
266	Heather Wheeler	C	South Derbyshire	6 May 2010	14 May 1959	
267	Peter Aldous	C	Waveney	6 May 2010	26 Aug 1961	
268	James Morris	C	Halesowen and Rowley Regis	6 May 2010	4 Feb 1967	
269	Mark Garnier	C	Wyre Forest	6 May 2010	26 Feb 1963	
270	Pauline Latham	C	Mid Derbyshire	6 May 2010	4 Feb 1948	
271	Chuka Umunna	LD	Streatham	6 May 2010	17 Oct 1978	
272	Andrew Percy	C	Brigg and Goole	6 May 2010	18 Sep 1977	
273	The Rt Hon Dominic Raab	C	Esher and Walton	6 May 2010	25 Feb 1974	
274	Damian Collins	C	Folkestone and Hythe	6 May 2010	4 Feb 1974	
275	The Rt Hon Caroline Nokes	C	Romsey and Southampton North	6 May 2010	26 Jun 1972	
276	Caroline Dinenage	C	Gosport	6 May 2010	28 Oct 1971	
277	The Rt Hon Conor Burns	C	Bournemouth West	6 May 2010	24 Sep 1972	
278	Mark Menzies	C	Fylde	6 May 2010	18 May 1971	
279	Toby Perkins	Lab	Chesterfield	6 May 2010	12 Aug 1970	
280	Bill Esterson	Lab	Sefton Central	6 May 2010	27 Oct 1966	
281	Yasmin Qureshi	Lab	Bolton South East	6 May 2010	5 Jul 1963	
282	The Hon Ian Paisley Jr	DUP	North Antrim	6 May 2010	12 Dec 1966	Child of late life peer Lord Bannside
283	Kate Green	Lab	Stretford and Urmston	6 May 2010	2 May 1960	
284	Rachel Reeves	Lab	Leeds West	6 May 2010	13 Feb 1979	
285	Jonathan Lord	C	Woking	6 May 2010	17 Sep 1962	
286	The Rt Hon Julian Smith	C	Skipton and Ripon	6 May 2010	30 Aug 1971	
287	Lilian Greenwood	Lab	Nottingham South	6 May 2010	26 Mar 1966	
288	Owen Smith	Lab	Pontypridd	6 May 2010	2 May 1970	Former Shadow Secretary of State for Northern Ireland
289	Chris Evans	Lab	Islwyn	6 May 2010	7 Jul 1976	
290	Julian Sturdy	C	York Outer	6 May 2010	3 Jun 1971	
291	Craig Whittaker	C	Calder Valley	6 May 2010	30 Aug 1962	
292	The Rt Hon Therese Coffey	C	Suffolk Coastal	6 May 2010	18 Nov 1971	
293	The Rt Hon Chris Skidmore	C	Kingswood	6 May 2010	17 May 1981	
294	Jonathan Edwards	PC	Carmarthen East and Dinefwr	6 May 2010	26 Apr 1976	Former Parliamentary group leader, PC
295	Jeremy Lefroy	C	Stafford	6 May 2010	30 May 1959	
296	Christopher Pincher	C	Tamworth	6 May 2010	24 Sep 1969	
297	The Rt Hon Nicky Morgan	C	Loughborough	6 May 2010	1 Oct 1972	
298	John Woodcock	Ind	Barrow and Furness	6 May 2010	14 Oct 1978	
299	George Freeman	C	Mid Norfolk	6 May 2010	12 Jul 1967	
300	Gavin Shuker	Ind	Luton South	6 May 2010	10 Oct 1981	
301	Bridget Phillipson	Lab	Houghton and Sunderland South	6 May 2010	19 Dec 1983	
302	Nick Smith	Lab	Blaenau Gwent	6 May 2010	14 Jan 1960	
303	David Rutley	C	Macclesfield	6 May 2010	7 Mar 1961	
304	Karl Turner	Lab	Kingston upon Hull East	6 May 2010	15 Apr 1971	
305	The Rt Hon Penny Mordaunt	C	Portsmouth North	6 May 2010	4 Mar 1973	Secretary of State for Defence
306	Alex Cunningham	Lab	Stockton North	6 May 2010	1 May 1955	
307	Chi Onwurah	Lab	Newcastle upon Tyne Central	6 May 2010	12 Apr 1965	
308	Heidi Alexander	Lab	Lewisham East	6 May 2010	17 Apr 1975	Resigned in May 2018 to trigger 2018 Lewisham East by-election
309	Yvonne Fovargue	Lab	Makerfield	6 May 2010	29 Nov 1956	
310	Gloria De Piero	Lab	Ashfield	6 May 2010	21 Dec 1972	
311	Jenny Chapman	Lab	Darlington	6 May 2010	25 Sep 1973	
312	Liz Kendall	Lab	Leicester West	6 May 2010	11 Jun 1971	
313	Luciana Berger	LD	Liverpool Wavertree	6 May 2010	13 May 1981	
314	Anne Marie Morris	C	Newton Abbot	6 May 2010	5 Jul 1957	Whip suspended and sat as Independent 10 Jul 2017– 12 Dec 2017
315	Henry Smith	C	Crawley	6 May 2010	14 May 1969	
316	Phillip Lee	LD	Bracknell	6 May 2010	28 Sep 1970	
317	The Rt Hon Liz Truss	C	South West Norfolk	6 May 2010	26 Jul 1975	Chief Secretary to the Treasury
318	Guy Opperman	C	Hexham	6 May 2010	18 May 1965	
319	Sheryll Murray	C	South East Cornwall	6 May 2010	4 Feb 1956	
320	Helen Grant	C	Maidstone and The Weald	6 May 2010	28 Sep 1961	
321	The Rt Hon Andrea Leadsom	C	South Northamptonshire	6 May 2010	13 May 1963	Former Leader of the House of Commons and Lord President of the Council
322	Richard Graham	C	Gloucester	6 May 2010	4 Apr 1958	
323	The Rt Hon Alok Sharma	C	Reading West	6 May 2010	7 Sep 1967	
324	Gareth Johnson	C	Dartford	6 May 2010	12 Oct 1969	
325	Marcus Jones	C	Nuneaton	6 May 2010	5 Apr 1974	
326	Andrew Stephenson	C	Pendle	6 May 2010	17 Feb 1981	
327	Steve Brine	C	Winchester	6 May 2010	28 Jan 1974	
328	The Rt Hon Brandon Lewis	C	Great Yarmouth	6 May 2010	20 Jun 1971	Chairman of the Conservative Party
329	Jackie Doyle-Price	C	Thurrock	6 May 2010	5 Aug 1969	
330	The Rt Hon Jo Johnson	C	Orpington	6 May 2010	23 Dec 1971	
331	Margot James	C	Stourbridge	6 May 2010	28 Aug 1957	
332	Mike Freer	C	Finchley and Golders Green	6 May 2010	29 May 1960	
333	Stephen Metcalfe	C	South Basildon and East Thurrock	6 May 2010	9 Jan 1966	
334	Stephen McPartland	C	Stevenage	6 May 2010	9 Aug 1976	
335	Gordon Henderson	C	Sittingbourne and Sheppey	6 May 2010	27 Jan 1948	
336	The Rt Hon Alun Cairns	C	Vale of Glamorgan	6 May 2010	30 Jul 1970	Secretary of State for Wales
337	Glyn Davies	C	Montgomeryshire	6 May 2010	16 Feb 1944	
338	Harriett Baldwin	C	West Worcestershire	6 May 2010	2 May 1960	
339	The Rt Hon Steve Barclay	C	North East Cambridgeshire	6 May 2010	3 May 1972	
340	The Rt Hon Gavin Williamson	C	South Staffordshire	6 May 2010	25 Jun 1976	Former Secretary of State for Defence
341	The Hon Robin Walker	C	Worcester	6 May 2010	12 Apr 1978	Child of late life peer Lord Walker of Worcester
342	The Rt Hon Michael Ellis	C	Northampton North	6 May 2010	13 Oct 1967	
343	Nadhim Zahawi	C	Stratford-on-Avon	6 May 2010	2 Jun 1967	
344	George Eustice	C	Camborne and Redruth	6 May 2010	28 Sep 1971	
345	Sir George Hollingbery	C	Meon Valley	6 May 2010	12 Oct 1963	
346	The Rt Hon Robert Buckland	C	South Swindon	6 May 2010	22 Sep 1968	
347	Justin Tomlinson	C	North Swindon	6 May 2010	5 Nov 1976	
348	Rehman Chishti	C	Gillingham and Rainham	6 May 2010	4 Oct 1978	
349	Paul Maynard	C	Blackpool North and Cleveleys	6 May 2010	16 Dec 1975	
350	Andrew Jones	C	Harrogate and Knaresborough	6 May 2010	28 Nov 1963	
351	Lisa Nandy	Lab	Wigan	6 May 2010	9 Aug 1979	
352	Paul Blomfield	Lab	Sheffield Central	6 May 2010	25 Aug 1953	
353	The Rt Hon Matt Hancock	C	West Suffolk	6 May 2010	2 Oct 1978	
354	Stuart Andrew	C	Pudsey	6 May 2010	25 Nov 1971	
355	Susan Elan Jones	Lab	Clwyd South	6 May 2010	1 Jun 1968	
356	Ian Murray	Lab	Edinburgh South	6 May 2010	10 Aug 1976	
357	Rebecca Harris	C	Castle Point	6 May 2010	22 Dec 1967	
358	Caroline Lucas	GP	Brighton Pavilion	6 May 2010	9 Dec 1960	
359	Matthew Offord	C	Hendon	6 May 2010	3 Sep 1969	
360	Teresa Pearce	Lab	Erith and Thamesmead	6 May 2010	1 Feb 1955	
361	The Rt Hon Jake Berry	C	Rossendale and Darwen	6 May 2010	29 Dec 1978	
362	Jack Dromey	Lab	Birmingham Erdington	6 May 2010	21 Sep 1948	
363	John Stevenson	C	Carlisle	6 May 2010	4 Jul 1963	
364	The Rt Hon Jacob Rees-Mogg	C	North East Somerset	6 May 2010	24 May 1969	Child of late cross-bench life peer Lord Rees-Mogg
365	Nick Boles	Ind	Grantham and Stamford	6 May 2010	2 Nov 1965	
366	The Rt Hon Amber Rudd	Ind	Hastings and Rye	6 May 2010	1 Aug 1963	Secretary of State for Work and Pensions
367	Sarah Newton	C	Truro and Falmouth	6 May 2010	19 Jul 1961	
368	Nic Dakin	Lab	Scunthorpe	6 May 2010	10 Jul 1955	
369	Rushanara Ali	Lab	Bethnal Green and Bow	6 May 2010	14 Mar 1975	
370	Shabana Mahmood	Lab	Birmingham Ladywood	6 May 2010	17 Sep 1980	
371	Graham Jones	Lab	Hyndburn	6 May 2010	3 Mar 1966	
372	Emma Reynolds	Lab	Wolverhampton North East	6 May 2010	2 Nov 1977	
373	The Rt Hon Kwasi Kwarteng	C	Spelthorne	6 May 2010	26 May 1975	
374	Mark Pawsey	C	Rugby	6 May 2010	16 Jan 1957	
375	Steve Baker	C	Wycombe	6 May 2010	6 Jun 1971	
376	Stephen Twigg	Lab	Liverpool West Derby	6 May 2010	25 Dec 1966	Previously served 1997–2005
377	Jim Shannon	DUP	Strangford	6 May 2010	25 Mar 1955	
378	The Rt Hon Karen Bradley	C	Staffordshire Moorlands	6 May 2010	12 Mar 1970	Secretary of State for Northern Ireland
379	Stella Creasy	Lab	Walthamstow	6 May 2010	5 Apr 1977	
380	Alison McGovern	Lab	Wirral South	6 May 2010	30 Dec 1980	
381	Debbie Abrahams	Lab	Oldham East and Saddleworth	13 Jan 2011	15 Sep 1960	Former Shadow Secretary of State for Work and Pensions
382	Dan Jarvis	Lab	Barnsley Central	3 Mar 2011	30 Nov 1972	
383	Jon Ashworth	Lab	Leicester South	5 May 2011	14 Oct 1978	Shadow Secretary of State for Health
384	Seema Malhotra	Lab	Feltham and Heston	15 Dec 2011	7 Aug 1972	
385	Stephen Doughty	Lab	Cardiff South and Penarth	15 Nov 2012	15 Apr 1980	
386	Lucy Powell	Lab	Manchester Central	15 Nov 2012	10 Oct 1974	
387	Sarah Champion	Lab	Rotherham	29 Nov 2012	10 Jul 1969	Shadow Minister for Women and Equalities
388	Andy McDonald	Lab	Middlesbrough	29 Nov 2012	8 Mar 1958	Shadow Secretary of State for Transport
389	Steve Reed	Lab	Croydon North	29 Nov 2012	12 Nov 1963	
390	Emma Lewell-Buck	Lab	South Shields	2 May 2013	8 Nov 1978	
391	Mike Kane	Lab	Wythenshawe and Sale East	13 Feb 2014	9 Jan 1969	
392	The Rt Hon Robert Jenrick	C	Newark	5 Jun 2014	9 Jan 1982	
393	Liz McInnes	Lab	Heywood and Middleton	9 Oct 2014	30 Mar 1959	
56th Parliament (elected: 7 May 2015, first met: 18 May 2015, dissolved: 3 May 2017)
394	Simon Hoare	C	North Dorset	7 May 2015	28 Jun 1969	
395	Kevin Hollinrake	C	Thirsk and Malton	7 May 2015	28 Sep 1963	
396	Ranil Jayawardena	C	North East Hampshire	7 May 2015	3 Sep 1986	
397	Alan Mak	C	Havant	7 May 2015	19 Nov 1983	
398	Tom Tugendhat	C	Tonbridge and Malling	7 May 2015	27 Jun 1973	
399	Chris Philp	C	Croydon South	7 May 2015	6 Jul 1976	
400	Judith Cummins	Lab	Bradford South	7 May 2015	26 Jun 1967	
401	The Rt Hon Liz Saville Roberts	PC	Dwyfor Meirionnydd	7 May 2015	16 Dec 1964	
402	Kevin Foster	C	Torbay	7 May 2015	31 Dec 1978	
403	Conor McGinn	Lab	St Helens North	7 May 2015	31 Jul 1984	
404	Kate Hollern	Lab	Blackburn	7 May 2015	12 Apr 1955	
405	Peter Dowd	Lab	Bootle	7 May 2015	20 Jun 1957	Shadow Chief Secretary to the Treasury
406	Tom Pursglove	C	Corby	7 May 2015	5 Nov 1988	
407	Nus Ghani	C	Wealden	7 May 2015	1 Sep 1972	
408	Johnny Mercer	C	Plymouth Moor View	7 May 2015	17 Aug 1981	
409	Anne-Marie Trevelyan	C	Berwick-upon-Tweed	7 May 2015	6 Apr 1969	
410	Rebecca Pow	C	Taunton Deane	7 May 2015	10 Oct 1960	
411	Michael Tomlinson-Mynors	C	Mid Dorset and North Poole	7 May 2015	1 Oct 1977	
412	Steve Double	C	St Austell and Newquay	7 May 2015	19 Dec 1966	
413	Mims Davies	C	Eastleigh	7 May 2015	2 Jun 1975	
414	Marcus Fysh	C	Yeovil	7 May 2015	8 Nov 1970	
415	Antoinette Sandbach	Ind	Eddisbury	7 May 2015	15 Feb 1969	
416	James Heappey	C	Wells	7 May 2015	30 Jan 1981	
417	Peter Heaton-Jones	C	North Devon	7 May 2015	2 Aug 1963	
418	Angela Rayner	Lab	Ashton-under-Lyne	7 May 2015	28 Mar 1980	Shadow Secretary of State for Education
419	Matthew Pennycook	Lab	Greenwich and Woolwich	7 May 2015	29 Oct 1982	
420	Rupa Huq	Lab	Ealing Central and Acton	7 May 2015	2 Apr 1972	
421	Maggie Throup	C	Erewash	7 May 2015	27 Jan 1957	
422	Alberto Costa	C	South Leicestershire	7 May 2015	13 Nov 1971	
423	Chris Matheson	Lab	City of Chester	7 May 2015	2 Jan 1968	
424	Royston Smith	C	Southampton Itchen	7 May 2015	13 May 1964	
425	Suella Fernandes	C	Fareham	7 May 2015	3 Apr 1980	
426	Edward Argar	C	Charnwood	7 May 2015	9 Dec 1977	
427	Matt Warman	C	Boston and Skegness	7 May 2015	1 Sep 1981	
428	Nigel Huddleston	C	Mid Worcestershire	7 May 2015	13 Oct 1970	
429	Mike Wood	C	Dudley South	7 May 2015	17 Mar 1976	
430	Sue Hayman	Lab	Workington	7 May 2015	28 Jul 1962	Shadow Secretary of State for Environment, Food and Rural Affairs
431	Melanie Onn	Lab	Great Grimsby	7 May 2015	19 Jun 1979	
432	The Rt Hon Joan Ryan	CHUK	Enfield North	7 May 2015	8 Sep 1955	Previously served 1997–2010
433	Dawn Butler	Lab	Brent Central	7 May 2015	3 Nov 1969	Previously served 2005–10. Shadow Minister for Diverse Communities.
434	Catherine West	Lab	Hornsey and Wood Green	7 May 2015	14 Sep 1966	
435	The Rt Hon Ian Blackford	SNP	Ross, Skye and Lochaber	7 May 2015	14 May 1961	Parliamentary group leader, SNP
436	Angela Crawley	SNP	Lanark and Hamilton East	7 May 2015	3 Jun 1987	
437	Mhairi Black	SNP	Paisley and Renfrewshire South	7 May 2015	12 Sep 1994	Baby of the House
438	Neil Gray	SNP	Airdrie and Shotts	7 May 2015	16 Mar 1986	
439	Philippa Whitford	SNP	Central Ayrshire	7 May 2015	24 Dec 1958	
440	Joanna Cherry	SNP	Edinburgh South West	7 May 2015	18 Mar 1966	
441	Lisa Cameron	SNP	East Kilbride, Strathaven and Lesmahagow	7 May 2015	8 Apr 1972	
442	John McNally	SNP	Falkirk	7 May 2015	1 Feb 1951	
443	Hannah Bardell	SNP	Livingston	7 May 2015	1 Jun 1983	
444	Stewart McDonald	SNP	Glasgow South	7 May 2015	24 Aug 1986	
445	Martyn Day	SNP	Linlithgow and East Falkirk	7 May 2015	26 Mar 1971	
446	The Hon Kate Osamor	Lab	Edmonton	7 May 2015	15 Aug 1968	Former Shadow Secretary of State for International Development; Child of life peer Baroness Osamor
447	Paula Sherriff	Lab	Dewsbury	7 May 2015	16 Apr 1975	
448	Naz Shah	Lab	Bradford West	7 May 2015	13 Nov 1973	
449	Nick Thomas-Symonds	Lab	Torfaen	7 May 2015	26 May 1980	
450	Drew Hendry	SNP	Inverness, Nairn, Badenoch and Strathspey	7 May 2015	21 May 1964	
451	Carol Monaghan	SNP	Glasgow North West	7 May 2015	2 Aug 1972	
452	Alan Brown	SNP	Kilmarnock and Loudoun	7 May 2015	12 Aug 1970	
453	Ronnie Cowan	SNP	Inverclyde	7 May 2015	6 Sep 1959	
454	Patricia Gibson	SNP	North Ayrshire and Arran	7 May 2015	12 May 1968	
455	Helen Hayes	Lab	Dulwich and West Norwood	7 May 2015	8 Aug 1974	
456	Vicky Foxcroft	Lab	Lewisham Deptford	7 May 2015	9 Mar 1977	
457	Brendan O'Hara	SNP	Argyll and Bute	7 May 2015	27 Apr 1963	
458	Marion Fellows	SNP	Motherwell and Wishaw	7 May 2015	5 May 1949	
459	Marie Rimmer	Lab	St Helens South and Whiston	7 May 2015	27 Apr 1947	
460	Thangam Debbonaire	Lab	Bristol West	7 May 2015	3 Aug 1966	
461	Holly Lynch	Lab	Halifax	7 May 2015	8 Oct 1986	
462	Stephen Gethins	SNP	North East Fife	7 May 2015	28 Mar 1976	
463	Patrick Grady	SNP	Glasgow North	7 May 2015	5 Feb 1980	
464	Kirsty Blackman	SNP	Aberdeen North	7 May 2015	20 Mar 1986	Parliamentary group deputy leader, SNP
465	Jess Phillips	Lab	Birmingham Yardley	7 May 2015	9 Oct 1981	
466	Justin Madders	Lab	Ellesmere Port and Neston	7 May 2015	22 Nov 1972	
467	Chris Law	SNP	Dundee West	7 May 2015	21 Oct 1969	
468	Chris Stephens	SNP	Glasgow South West	7 May 2015	20 Mar 1973	
469	The Hon Victoria Prentis	C	Banbury	7 May 2015	24 Mar 1971	Child of life peer Lord Boswell of Aynho
470	Colleen Fletcher	Lab	Coventry North East	7 May 2015	23 Nov 1954	
471	Cat Smith	Lab	Lancaster and Fleetwood	7 May 2015	16 Jun 1985	Shadow Minister for Voter Engagement and Youth Affairs
472	Deidre Brock	SNP	Edinburgh North and Leith	7 May 2015	8 Dec 1961	
473	Rebecca Long-Bailey	Lab	Salford and Eccles	7 May 2015	22 Sep 1979	Shadow Secretary of State for Business, Energy and Industrial Strategy
474	Maria Caulfield	C	Lewes	7 May 2015	6 Aug 1973	
475	Stuart McDonald	SNP	Cumbernauld, Kilsyth and Kirkintilloch East	7 May 2015	2 May 1978	
476	Richard Burgon	Lab	Leeds East	7 May 2015	19 Sep 1980	Shadow Secretary of State for Justice and Shadow Lord Chancellor
477	Imran Hussain	Lab	Bradford East	7 May 2015	7 Jun 1978	
478	Alison Thewliss	SNP	Glasgow Central	7 May 2015	13 Sep 1982	
479	Daniel Zeichner	Lab	Cambridge	7 May 2015	9 Nov 1956	
480	Douglas Chapman	SNP	Dunfermline and West Fife	7 May 2015	5 Jan 1955	
481	Tommy Sheppard	SNP	Edinburgh East	7 May 2015	6 Mar 1959	
482	Rachael Maskell	Lab	York Central	7 May 2015	5 Jul 1972	
483	Louise Haigh	Lab	Sheffield Heeley	7 May 2015	22 Jul 1987	
484	Lucy Allan	C	Telford	7 May 2015	2 Oct 1964	
485	Jo Stevens	Lab	Cardiff Central	7 May 2015	6 Sep 1966	
486	Lucy Frazer	C	South East Cambridgeshire	7 May 2015	17 May 1972	
487	Victoria Atkins	C	Louth and Horncastle	7 May 2015	22 Mar 1976	
488	Seema Kennedy	C	South Ribble	7 May 2015	6 Oct 1974	
489	Christopher Davies	C	Brecon and Radnorshire	7 May 2015	18 Aug 1967	Removed on 21 June 2019 following a recall petition.
490	Karin Smyth	Lab	Bristol South	7 May 2015	8 Sep 1964	
491	Paul Scully	C	Sutton and Cheam	7 May 2015	29 Apr 1968	
492	Clive Lewis	Lab	Norwich South	7 May 2015	11 Sep 1971	
493	Wendy Morton	C	Aldridge-Brownhills	7 May 2015	9 Nov 1967	
494	Gerald Jones	Lab	Merthyr Tydfil and Rhymney	7 May 2015	21 Aug 1970	
495	Kit Malthouse	C	North West Hampshire	7 May 2015	27 Oct 1966	
496	Margaret Greenwood	Lab	Wirral West	7 May 2015	14 Mar 1959	
497	Luke Hall	C	Thornbury and Yate	7 May 2015	8 Jul 1986	
498	Scott Mann	C	North Cornwall	7 May 2015	24 Jun 1977	
499	Julian Knight	C	Solihull	7 May 2015	5 Jan 1972	
500	Craig Tracey	C	North Warwickshire	7 May 2015	21 Aug 1974	
501	Amanda Milling	C	Cannock Chase	7 May 2015	12 Mar 1975	
502	Andrea Jenkyns	C	Morley and Outwood	7 May 2015	16 Jun 1974	
503	Chris Green	C	Bolton West	7 May 2015	12 Aug 1973	
504	Jo Churchill	C	Bury St Edmunds	7 May 2015	18 Mar 1964	
505	James Cartlidge	C	South Suffolk	7 May 2015	30 Apr 1974	
506	The Rt Hon Oliver Dowden	C	Hertsmere	7 May 2015	1 Aug 1978	
507	Huw Merriman	C	Bexhill and Battle	7 May 2015	13 Jul 1973	
508	Helen Whately	C	Faversham and Mid Kent	7 May 2015	23 Jun 1976	
509	Julie Cooper	Lab	Burnley	7 May 2015	20 Jun 1960	
510	Tulip Siddiq	Lab	Hampstead and Kilburn	7 May 2015	16 Sep 1982	
511	Jeff Smith	Lab	Manchester Withington	7 May 2015	26 Jan 1963	
512	The Rt Hon Sir Keir Starmer	Lab	Holborn and St Pancras	7 May 2015	2 Sep 1962	Shadow Secretary of State for Exiting the European Union
513	Anna Turley	Lab	Redcar	7 May 2015	9 Oct 1978	
514	The Rt Hon James Cleverly	C	Braintree	7 May 2015	4 Sep 1969	
515	Will Quince	C	Colchester	7 May 2015	27 Dec 1982	
516	Ruth Cadbury	Lab	Brentford and Isleworth	7 May 2015	14 May 1959	
517	Carolyn Harris	Lab	Swansea East	7 May 2015	18 Sep 1960	
518	Christina Rees	Lab	Neath	7 May 2015	21 Feb 1954	Shadow Secretary of State for Wales
519	Mary Robinson	C	Cheadle	7 May 2015	23 Aug 1955	
520	Alex Chalk	C	Cheltenham	7 May 2015	8 Aug 1976	
521	Ruth Smeeth	Lab	Stoke-on-Trent North	7 May 2015	29 Jun 1979	
522	Wes Streeting	Lab	Ilford North	7 May 2015	21 Jan 1983	
523	Peter Kyle	Lab	Hove	7 May 2015	9 Sep 1970	
524	The Rt Hon Rishi Sunak	C	Richmond (Yorks)	7 May 2015	12 May 1980	
525	Kelly Tolhurst	C	Rochester and Strood	7 May 2015	23 Aug 1978	
526	Craig Mackinlay	C	South Thanet	7 May 2015	7 Oct 1966	
527	The Hon Stephen Kinnock	Lab	Aberavon	7 May 2015	1 Jan 1970	Child of life peers Lord Kinnock and Baroness Kinnock of Holyhead
528	Martin Docherty-Hughes	SNP	West Dunbartonshire	7 May 2015	21 Jan 1971	
529	Jeremy Quin	C	Horsham	7 May 2015	24 Sep 1968	
530	Neil Coyle	Lab	Bermondsey and Old Southwark	7 May 2015	30 Dec 1978	
531	William Wragg	C	Hazel Grove	7 May 2015	11 Dec 1987	
532	Peter Grant	SNP	Glenrothes	7 May 2015	12 Oct 1960	
533	Heidi Allen	LD	South Cambridgeshire	7 May 2015	18 Jan 1975	
534	Michelle Donelan	C	Chippenham	7 May 2015	8 Apr 1984	
535	Gavin Newlands	SNP	Paisley and Renfrewshire North	7 May 2015	2 Feb 1980	
536	Derek Thomas	C	St Ives	7 May 2015	20 Jul 1972	
537	David Warburton	C	Somerton and Frome	7 May 2015	28 Oct 1965	
538	Gavin Robinson	DUP	Belfast East	7 May 2015	22 Nov 1984	
539	The Rt Hon Boris Johnson	C	Uxbridge and South Ruislip	7 May 2015	19 Jun 1964	Previously served 2001–08. Mayor of London, 2008–2016. Former Secretary of State for Foreign and Commonwealth Affairs. Leader of the Conservatives 23 Jul 2019 – present. Prime Minister 24 Jul 2019 – present.
540	Jim McMahon	Lab	Oldham West and Royton	3 Dec 2015	7 Jul 1980	
541	Gill Furniss	Lab	Sheffield Brightside and Hillsborough	5 May 2016	14 Mar 1957	
542	Christopher Elmore	Lab	Ogmore	5 May 2016	23 Dec 1983	
543	Rosena Allin-Khan	Lab	Tooting	16 Jun 2016	1 Jan 1977	
544	Tracy Brabin	Lab	Batley and Spen	20 Oct 2016	9 May 1961	
545	Robert Courts	C	Witney	20 Oct 2016	21 Oct 1978	
546	Caroline Johnson	C	Sleaford and North Hykeham	8 Dec 2016	31 Dec 1977	
547	Gareth Snell	Lab	Stoke-on-Trent Central	23 Feb 2017	1 Jan 1986	
548	Trudy Harrison	C	Copeland	23 Feb 2017	19 Apr 1976	
57th Parliament (elected: 8 June 2017, first met: 13 June 2017, dissolved: 6 November 2019)
549	The Rt Hon Sir Ed Davey	LD	Kingston and Surbiton	8 Jun 2017	25 Dec 1965	Previously served 1997–2015. LD Home Affairs Spokesperson.
550	The Rt Hon Sir Vince Cable	LD	Twickenham	8 Jun 2017	9 May 1943	Previously served 1997–2015. LD Treasury Spokesperson 2015–17, Leader of the Liberal Democrats 2017–2019.
551	Tony Lloyd	Lab	Rochdale	8 Jun 2017	25 Feb 1950	Previously served 1983–2012. Police and Crime Commissioner for Greater Manchester 2012–2015, interim Mayor of Greater Manchester 2015–2017
552	The Rt Hon Esther McVey	C	Tatton	8 Jun 2017	24 Oct 1967	Previously served 2010–15
553	Faisal Rashid	Lab	Warrington South	8 Jun 2017	6 Sep 1972	
554	Fiona Onasanya	Ind	Peterborough	8 Jun 2017	23 Aug 1983	Whip suspended and sat as Independent from 19 Dec 2018. Removed after a recall petition on 1 May 2019.
555	Paul Williams	Lab	Stockton South	8 Jun 2017	23 Aug 1972	
556	Chris Ruane	Lab	Vale of Clwyd	8 Jun 2017	18 Jul 1958	Previously served 1997–2015
557	Tan Dhesi	Lab	Slough	8 Jun 2017	17 Aug 1978	
558	Afzal Khan	Lab	Manchester Gorton	8 Jun 2017	5 Apr 1958	
559	Luke Pollard	Lab	Plymouth Sutton and Devonport	8 Jun 2017	10 Apr 1980	
560	Alex Norris	Lab	Nottingham North	8 Jun 2017	4 Feb 1984	
561	The Rt Hon Alister Jack	C	Dumfries and Galloway	8 Jun 2017	7 Jul 1963	
562	Kirstene Hair	C	Angus	8 Jun 2017	12 Aug 1989	
563	Andrew Bowie	C	West Aberdeenshire and Kincardine	8 Jun 2017	28 May 1987	
564	Bill Grant	C	Ayr, Carrick and Cumnock	8 Jun 2017	14 Aug 1951	
565	Colin Clark	C	Gordon	8 Jun 2017	20 May 1969	
566	Paul Masterton	C	East Renfrewshire	8 Jun 2017	2 Nov 1985	
567	Eleanor Smith	Lab	Wolverhampton South West	8 Jun 2017	5 Jul 1957	
568	Marsha de Cordova	Lab	Battersea	8 Jun 2017	23 Jan 1976	
569	Matt Western	Lab	Warwick and Leamington	8 Jun 2017	Nov 1962	
570	Wera Hobhouse	LD	Bath	8 Jun 2017	8 Feb 1960	LD Communities & Local Government and Refugees Spokesperson
571	Jo Platt	Lab	Leigh	8 Jun 2017	15 Jun 1973	
572	Tonia Antoniazzi	Lab	Gower	8 Jun 2017	5 Oct 1971	
573	Stephen Lloyd	LD	Eastbourne	8 Jun 2017	15 Jun 1957	Previously served 2010–15. LD Work & Pensions Spokesperson.
574	Jamie Stone	LD	Caithness, Sutherland and Easter Ross	8 Jun 2017	16 Jun 1954	LD Scotland Spokesperson.
575	Laura Smith	Lab	Crewe and Nantwich	8 Jun 2017	1985	
576	Mike Amesbury	Lab	Weaver Vale	8 Jun 2017	7 May 1969	
577	Christine Jardine	LD	Edinburgh West	8 Jun 2017	24 Nov 1960	LD Culture, Media & Sport Spokesperson
578	David Linden	SNP	Glasgow East	8 Jun 2017	14 May 1990	
579	Ben Lake	PC	Ceredigion	8 Jun 2017	22 Jan 1993	
580	Sandy Martin	Lab	Ipswich	8 Jun 2017	2 May 1957	
581	Anneliese Dodds	Lab	Oxford East	8 Jun 2017	16 Mar 1978	
582	Mohammad Yasin	Lab	Bedford	8 Jun 2017	15 Oct 1971	
583	Alex Sobel	Lab	Leeds North West	8 Jun 2017	26 Apr 1975	
584	Emma Hardy	Lab	Kingston upon Hull West and Hessle	8 Jun 2017	16 Sep 1980	
585	Thelma Walker	Lab	Colne Valley	8 Jun 2017	7 Apr 1957	
586	Paul Girvan	DUP	South Antrim	8 Jun 2017	6 Jul 1963	
587	Darren Jones	Lab	Bristol North West	8 Jun 2017	13 Nov 1986	
588	Mike Hill	Lab	Hartlepool	8 Jun 2017	12 May 1963	
589	John Lamont	C	Berwickshire, Roxburgh and Selkirk	8 Jun 2017	15 Apr 1976	
590	Douglas Ross	C	Moray	8 Jun 2017	27 Jan 1983	
591	Luke Graham	C	Ochil and South Perthshire	8 Jun 2017	Jun 1985	
592	Stephen Kerr	C	Stirling	8 Jun 2017	26 Sep 1960	
593	Ross Thomson	C	Aberdeen South	8 Jun 2017	21 Sep 1987	
594	David Duguid	C	Banff and Buchan	8 Jun 2017	8 Oct 1970	
595	Bambos Charalambous	Lab	Enfield Southgate	8 Jun 2017	2 Dec 1967	
596	Ruth George	Lab	High Peak	8 Jun 2017	27 Nov 1969	
597	Laura Pidcock	Lab	North West Durham	8 Jun 2017	18 Jun 1987	
598	Dan Carden	Lab	Liverpool Walton	8 Jun 2017	28 Oct 1986	
599	Ellie Reeves	Lab	Lewisham West and Penge	8 Jun 2017	11 Dec 1980	
600	Stephanie Peacock	Lab	Barnsley East	8 Jun 2017	19 Dec 1986	
601	The Rt Hon Zac Goldsmith	C	Richmond Park	8 Jun 2017	20 Jan 1975	Previously served 2010–16
602	Liz Twist	Lab	Blaydon	8 Jun 2017	Jul 1956	
603	Chris Williamson	Ind	Derby North	8 Jun 2017	16 Sep 1956	Previously served 2010–15
604	Leo Docherty	C	Aldershot	8 Jun 2017	4 Oct 1976	
605	Bim Afolami	C	Hitchin and Harpenden	8 Jun 2017	11 Feb 1986	
606	Emma Little-Pengelly	DUP	Belfast South	8 Jun 2017	31 Dec 1979	
607	Neil O'Brien	C	Harborough	8 Jun 2017	6 Nov 1978	
608	Alex Burghart	C	Brentwood and Ongar	8 Jun 2017	7 Sep 1977	
609	Jack Brereton	C	Stoke-on-Trent South	8 Jun 2017	13 May 1991	
610	Rachel Maclean	C	Redditch	8 Jun 2017	3 Oct 1965	
611	Vicky Ford	C	Chelmsford	8 Jun 2017	21 Sep 1967	
612	Julia Dockerill	C	Hornchurch and Upminster	8 Jun 2017	4 Jun 1984	
613	Simon Clarke	C	Middlesbrough South and East Cleveland	8 Jun 2017	28 Sep 1984	
614	Gillian Keegan	C	Chichester	8 Jun 2017	13 Mar 1968	
615	Lee Rowley	C	North East Derbyshire	8 Jun 2017	11 Sep 1980	
616	Andrew Lewer	C	Northampton South	8 Jun 2017	18 Jul 1971	
617	Eddie Hughes	C	Walsall North	8 Jun 2017	3 Oct 1968	
618	Giles Watling	C	Clacton	8 Jun 2017	18 Feb 1953	
619	Damien Moore	C	Southport	8 Jun 2017	26 Apr 1980	
620	Bob Seely	C	Isle of Wight	8 Jun 2017	1 Jun 1966	
621	Stephen Morgan	Lab	Portsmouth South	8 Jun 2017	17 Jan 1981	
622	Anna McMorrin	Lab	Cardiff North	8 Jun 2017	1971	
623	Preet Gill	Lab	Birmingham Edgbaston	8 Jun 2017	Nov 1972	
624	John Grogan	Lab	Keighley	8 Jun 2017	24 Feb 1961	Previously served 1997–2010
625	Lesley Laird	Lab	Kirkcaldy and Cowdenbeath	8 Jun 2017	15 Nov 1958	Shadow Secretary of State for Scotland
626	Ged Killen	Lab	Rutherglen and Hamilton West	8 Jun 2017	15 May 1986	
627	Martin Whitfield	Lab	East Lothian	8 Jun 2017	1965	
628	Danielle Rowley	Lab	Midlothian	8 Jun 2017	25 Feb 1990	
629	Hugh Gaffney	Lab	Coatbridge, Chryston and Bellshill	8 Jun 2017	10 Aug 1963	
630	Paul Sweeney	Lab	Glasgow North East	8 Jun 2017	16 Jan 1989	
631	Ben Bradley	C	Mansfield	8 Jun 2017	11 Dec 1989	
632	James Frith	Lab	Bury North	8 Jun 2017	23 Apr 1977	
633	Matt Rodda	Lab	Reading East	8 Jun 2017	15 Dec 1966	
634	David Drew	Lab	Stroud	8 Jun 2017	13 Apr 1952	Previously served 1997–2010
635	Jared O'Mara	Ind	Sheffield Hallam	8 Jun 2017	15 Nov 1981	Whip suspended and sat as Independent from 25 Oct 2017
636	Kemi Badenoch	C	Saffron Walden	8 Jun 2017	Jan 1980	
637	Layla Moran	LD	Oxford West and Abingdon	8 Jun 2017	12 Sep 1982	LD Education and Young People Spokesperson
638	Karen Lee	Lab	Lincoln	8 Jun 2017	15 Jan 1959	
639	Sarah Jones	Lab	Croydon Central	8 Jun 2017	20 Dec 1972	
640	Rosie Duffield	Lab	Canterbury	8 Jun 2017	1 Jul 1971	
641	Lloyd Russell-Moyle	Lab	Brighton Kemptown	8 Jun 2017	14 Sep 1986	
642	Jo Swinson	LD	East Dunbartonshire	8 Jun 2017	5 Feb 1980	Previously served 2005–15. Deputy Leader, LD. LD Foreign Affairs Spokesperson. Leader of the Liberal Democrats 2019–
643	Emma Dent Coad	Lab	Kensington	8 Jun 2017	15 Nov 1954	
644	Janet Daby	Lab	Lewisham East	14 June 2018	15 Dec 1970	Elected 14 Jun 2018. Took seat 18 Jun 2018
645	Ruth Jones	Lab	Newport West	5 April 2019	1962	Elected 5 April 2019
646	Lisa Forbes	Lab	Peterborough	6 June 2019	28 Jul 1969	Elected 6 June 2019
647	Jane Dodds	LD	Brecon and Radnorshire	2 August 2019	23 Sep 1963	Elected 2 August 2019
Members who have never been sworn in
–	Paul Maskey	SF	Belfast West	9 Jun 2011	10 Jun 1967	
–	Francie Molloy	SF	Mid Ulster	7 Mar 2013	16 Dec 1950	
–	Mickey Brady	SF	Newry and Armagh	7 May 2015	7 Oct 1950	
–	Michelle Gildernew	SF	Fermanagh and South Tyrone	8 Jun 2017	28 Mar 1970	Previously served 2001–15
–	Chris Hazzard	SF	South Down	8 Jun 2017	20 Aug 1984	
–	Elisha McCallion	SF	Foyle	8 Jun 2017	21 Oct 1982	
–	Barry McElduff	SF	West Tyrone	8 Jun 2017	16 Aug 1966	Suspended by SF and became Independent 8 Jan 2018. Resigned 16 Jan 2018.
–	Órfhlaith Begley	SF	West Tyrone	3 May 2018	19 Dec 1991	Elected 3 May 2018

== See also ==
- List of MPs elected in the 2017 United Kingdom general election
- List of United Kingdom by-elections (2010–present)
- List of United Kingdom MPs by seniority
