= IRFBA =

IRFBA may refer to:

- Investigation Bureau for Railway, Funicular and Boat Accidents
- International Religious Freedom or Belief Alliance
