= List of United Kingdom MPs by seniority =

In the United Kingdom, the Members of Parliament (MPs) are ranked by the beginning of their terms in office, in the House of Commons.

List of United Kingdom MPs by seniority may refer to:

- List of United Kingdom MPs by seniority (2010–2015)
- List of United Kingdom MPs by seniority (2015–2017)
- List of United Kingdom MPs by seniority (2017–2019)
- List of United Kingdom MPs by seniority (2019–2024)
- List of United Kingdom MPs by seniority (2024–present)
