= 1971 Macclesfield by-election =

UK parliamentary by-election

← 1970	30 September 1971	Feb. 1974 →

Constituency of Macclesfield
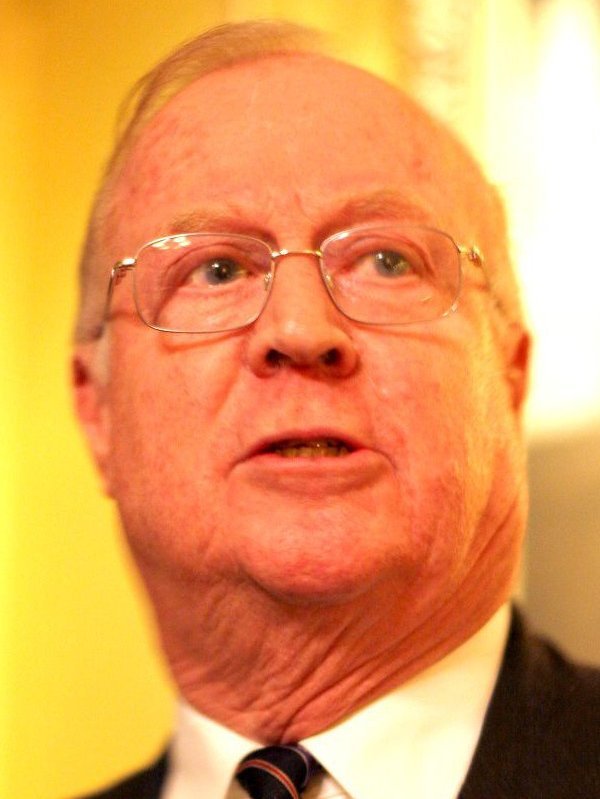
	First party	Second party	Third party
		Lab	Lib
Candidate	Nicholas Winterton	Diana Jeuda	R. M. Hammond
Party	Conservative	Labour	Liberal
Popular vote	24,933	23,854	5,991
Percentage	44.65%	42.71%	10.73%
Swing	▼7.44%	▲9.38%	▼3.85%
MP before election
Arthur Vere Harvey
Conservative
Subsequent MP
Nicholas Winterton
Conservative

The 1971 Macclesfield by-election was a parliamentary by-election held on 30 September 1971 for the constituency of Macclesfield in Cheshire. It was caused by the elevation to the peerage of the sitting MP, the Conservative Arthur Vere Harvey.

Although this was a fairly safe seat which had been Conservative for over half a century, the party managers were concerned since the Labour party had recently won Bromsgrove with a 10.1 per cent swing and only 9.5 per cent would be required to take Macclesfield.

The Conservative candidate was Nicholas Winterton, who had previously run unsuccessfully at Newcastle-under-Lyme. Winterton had made clear his opposition to membership of the European Economic Community and it was felt that the result might be taken as a referendum on the proposed terms of entry. It was reported that Douglas Hurd, the Prime Minister's political private secretary, withdrew when it became obvious that the local party preferred an anti-EEC candidate. The Labour candidate, Diana Jeuda, whose husband had previously run for the party in this constituency, was also against joining. There were two other minor anti-EEC candidates, Reginald Simmerson (Anti-Common Market) and Robert Goodall (English Resurgence Movement). Michael Hammond of the Liberal Party was the only openly pro-Europe candidate. In the course of the campaign, Winterton changed his position on the issue.

The result was a narrow win for the Conservatives, with a majority down from over 10,000 at the general election to just 1,079.

Macclesfield by-election, 1971
Party	Candidate	Votes	%	±%
Conservative	Nicholas Winterton	24,933	44.65	−7.44
Labour	Diana Jeuda	23,854	42.71	+9.38
Liberal	R. M. Hammond	5,991	10.73	−3.85
Anti-Common Market Party	Reginald Simmerson	976	1.75	New
English National Resurgence	Robert Goodall	92	0.16	New
Majority		1,079	1.94	−16.82
Turnout		55,846		
Conservative hold		Swing		
