= Arthur Vere Harvey, Baron Harvey of Prestbury =

British Royal Air Force officer and Conservative politician

Air Commodore The Right Honourable The Lord Harvey of Prestbury CBE

Chair of the 1922 Committee
- In office 6 May 1966 – 16 July 1970
- Leader: Edward Heath
- Preceded by: William Anstruther-Gray
- Succeeded by: Harry Legge-Bourke

Member of Parliament for Macclesfield
- In office 26 July 1945 – 1 May 1971
- Preceded by: Willard Weston
- Succeeded by: Nicholas Winterton

Personal details
- Born: Arthur Vere Harvey; 31 January 1906
- Died: 5 April 1994 (aged 88) Saint Martin, Guernsey
- Party: Conservative
- Education: Framlingham College

Military service
- Allegiance: United Kingdom
- Branch/service: Royal Air Force
- Years of service: 1925–1930; 1937–1945
- Rank: Air Commodore
- Commands: No. 10 (Fighter) Group (1944); RAF Coltishall (1943); No. 615 (County of Surrey) Squadron (1937–40)
- Battles/wars: Second World War
- Awards: Commander of the Order of the British Empire; Mentioned in Despatches (2)

Arthur Vere Harvey, Baron Harvey of Prestbury, CBE (31 January 1906 – 5 April 1994) was a senior Royal Air Force officer and a British Conservative politician who served as a Member of Parliament (MP) for 26 years.

== Early life and Second World War ==
Harvey was educated at Framlingham College, Suffolk and served with the Royal Air Force 1925–30 and during the Second World War. He was an advisor to the Southern Chinese Air Forces 1932–35 and a squadron leader in the Auxiliary Air Force in 1937. He founded the No. 615 (County of Surrey) Squadron and commanded it through the Battle of France. He was appointed a Commander of the Order of the British Empire in 1942. He later became a company chairman and director of several firms.

== Member of Parliament ==
Harvey was selected as the Conservative candidate for Macclesfield after the previous candidate Guy Gibson was killed in action. Harvey was elected as Member of Parliament for Macclesfield in 1945, and held the seat in seven further general elections. He was knighted in 1957.

In the Commons, Harvey was chairman of the backbench 1922 Committee from 1966 to 1970. On 14 October 1969 he was made an Honorary Freeman of the Borough of Macclesfield.

Harvey was created a life peer as Baron Harvey of Prestbury, of Prestbury in the County Palatine of Chester on 1 May 1971. He was succeeded as MP in the subsequent by-election by fellow-Conservative, Nicholas Winterton.

== Family and later life ==
He was married three times.

- in 1940 to Jacqueline Dunnett (two sons, marriage dissolved 1954)
- in 1955 Mrs Hilary Williams (died 1978; marriage dissolved 1977)
- in 1978 Mrs Carol Cassar-Torreggiani; three adopted daughters.

He died at St Martin's Port, Guernsey 5 April 1994.

== Arms ==
Coat of arms of Arthur Vere Harvey, Baron Harvey of Prestbury
Crest A roundel Gules charged with a roundel Argent thereon a roundel Azure charged with two fleurs-de-lis in fess Or. Escutcheon Per pale Argent and Sable a chevron counterchanged between two lions passant respectant the dexter Azure the sinister Or in chief a tun counterchanged in base on a chief Vert a garb between two fleurs-de-lis Or. Supporters On either side a rabbit Argent charged on the shoulder with a fleur-de-lis Vert. Motto Je Noublieray Jamais

== Notes ==
Military offices
Preceded by Charles Steele	Air Officer Commanding No. 10 (Fighter) Group; 1944	Succeeded by John Cole-Hamilton
Preceded by George Harvey	Commanding Officer RAF Coltishall; 1943	Succeeded by Arthur Donaldson
Parliament of the United Kingdom
Preceded by W. Garfield Weston	Member of Parliament for Macclesfield; 1945–1971	Succeeded by Sir Nicholas Winterton
Political offices
Preceded by Sir William Anstruther-Gray	Chairman of the 1922 Committee; 1966–1970	Succeeded by Sir Harry Legge-Bourke
