= International Religious Freedom or Belief Alliance =

Network of countries promoting freedom of religion or belief worldwide

The International Religious Freedom or Belief Alliance (IRFBA) is a network of countries promoting freedom of religion or belief (FoRB) worldwide. It has 38 member states. There are also five IRFBA friends and three IRFBA observers. It was launched in February 2020. The IRFBA is also known as the Ministerial conference of the Article 18 Alliance. In December 2024, the Alliance was designated as an "undesirable organization" in Russia.

== Principles and objectives ==
The principles and objectives of the Alliance are set out in the Declaration of Principles of the IRFBA.

The aim of the Alliance is to connect states and governments to promote freedom of religion or belief worldwide. In doing so, the Alliance refers to Article 18 of the Universal Declaration of Human Rights and Article 18 of the International Covenant on Civil and Political Rights (ICCPR), in which freedom of religion or belief is enshrined as a universal human right. In addition, the Alliance refers to the 1981 UN Declaration on the Elimination of All Forms of Intolerance and of Discrimination Based on Religion or Belief, the EU Guidelines on the promotion and protection of freedom of religion or belief and the OSCE Guidelines on Freedom of Religion or Belief and Security. In line with this understanding of freedom of religion or belief, which follows the human rights approach, freedom of religion or belief accordingly includes the right of the individual to have or not to have any faith, to change religion or belief and to manifest his or her religion or belief alone or in community with others in worship, rites, practice and teaching. The promotion of religious freedom should be based on the principle that human rights, which include freedom of religion or belief, are universal and inseparable. The Alliance aims to pay particular attention to the protection of members of religious minorities and the fight against discrimination and persecution on the grounds of religion or belief.

The Alliance's activities are intended to complement existing work to promote freedom of religion or belief in the context of the United Nations and other multilateral and regional organisations.

== Members ==
The Alliance currently has 38 member states: Albania, Armenia, Austria, Australia, Bosnia and Herzegovina, Brazil, Bulgaria, Cameroon, Colombia, Costa Rica, Croatia, Cyprus, Czech Republic, The Democratic Republic of Congo, Denmark, Estonia, The Gambia, Georgia, Germany, Greece, Hungary, Israel, Kosovo, Latvia, Lithuania, Malta, the Netherlands, Norway, Poland, Romania, Senegal, Sierra Leone, Slovakia, Slovenia, Togo, Ukraine, the United Kingdom, and the United States. There are also five IRFBA friends: Canada, Guyana, Japan, South Korea, and Sweden. There are three IRFBA observers: Sovereign Order of Malta, Taiwan, and the United Nations Special Rapporteur on Freedom of Religion or Belief.

A prerequisite for joining the Alliance is a clear commitment to the Alliance's Declaration of Principles.

== Chair ==
In 2022 Fiona Bruce was elected as Chair of the IRFBA, and was re-elected for a second term in 2023. The current Chair is Robert Rehak.

== Ministerial Conferences ==
The 2023 IRFBA Ministerial Conference on the theme of FoRB under authoritarian regimes brought together representatives from 60 countries in Prague in late November. This featured sessions on digital surveillance, sports diplomacy, women and FoRB, youth advocates and regional panels on the Middle East and Central Europe. The program can be found on the Czech Republic's Ministry of Foreign Affairs website.

== Literature ==
- Jos Douma: International Religious Freedom (or Belief) Alliance From Populist to not yet Popular. In: Bernd Hirschberger, Katja Voges (eds.): Religious Freedom and Populism. The Appropriation of a Human Right and How to Counter It. transcript, Bielefeld 2024, ISBN 978-3-8376-6827-8, pp. 183–197.
- Knox Thames: The London Blueprint for Progress. 3 July 2022, accessed on 3 July 2024.
