= Ann Winterton =

British Conservative politician (born 1941)

Lady Winterton
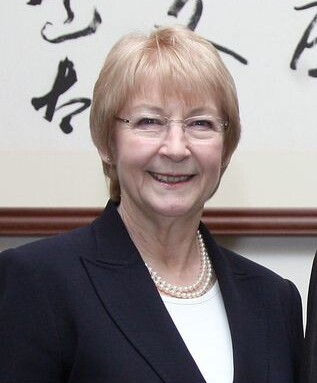
- Ann Winterton in 2010

Shadow Minister for Agriculture
- In office 2001–2002

Opposition Spokesperson, Cabinet Office
- In office 1999–2001

Member of Parliament for Congleton
- In office 9 June 1983 – 12 April 2010
- Preceded by: Constituency Created
- Succeeded by: Fiona Bruce

Personal details
- Born: Jane Ann Hodgson; 6 March 1941 (age 85) Sutton Coldfield, Warwickshire, England
- Party: Conservative
- Spouse: Nicholas Winterton

Jane Ann, Lady Winterton (née Hodgson; born 6 March 1941) is a retired British Conservative Party politician who was the Member of Parliament (MP) for Congleton from 1983 to 2010. She is married to Sir Nicholas Winterton, also a former Conservative MP.

== Early life ==
Winterton was in born in Sutton Coldfield and educated at Erdington Grammar School for Girls.

== Parliamentary career ==
Following her election to represent Congleton in 1983, she was a member of several select committees, including Agriculture (1987–1997), the chairman's panel (1992–1998) and the National Drug Strategy (1998–2001), Social Security (2000–2001) and the Unopposed Bills Panel from 1997. She is a representative of the Organization for Security and Co-operation in Europe, and a patron of Cheshire National Society for the Prevention of Cruelty to Children.

=== Racism ===
Winterton became Shadow Minister for Agriculture in 2001, and was later sacked from that position after she told the following joke at a dinner at Congleton rugby club on 3 May 2002:

An Englishman, a Cuban, a Japanese man and a Pakistani were all on a train.
The Cuban threw a fine Havana cigar out the window. When he was asked why, he replied: "They are ten a penny in my country."
The Japanese man threw an expensive Nikon camera out of the carriage, adding: "These are ten a penny in my country."
The Englishman then picked up the Pakistani and threw him out of the train window.
When the other travellers asked him to account for his actions, he said: "They are ten a penny in my country."

In February 2004, she had the Conservative whip removed for telling the following joke (which alluded to the recent death of twenty-three illegal immigrant Chinese cockle-pickers in Morecambe Bay) at a Whitehall private dinner party to improve Denmark–United Kingdom relations and declining to apologise:

One shark turned to the other to say he was fed up chasing tuna and the other said, "Why don't we go to Morecambe Bay and get some Chinese?"

A month later, Winterton apologised for the joke, and had the whip restored. Lord Taylor of Warwick, the only black Conservative peer in the House of Lords, and who was later sentenced to a year's imprisonment for false accounting during the parliamentary expenses scandal, criticised the decision to restore the whip and said she was not fit to be an MP.

Nick Palmer, then Labour MP for Broxtowe, who was at the dinner, criticised the joke and told BBC Radio 4's Today, "People were a bit stunned really. It was a very low-key friendly dinner. I was very sorry for the host – it was just a group of people discussing Danish issues."

Michael Howard, the then leader of the Conservatives, said, "Ann Winterton's remarks about the tragic deaths in Morecambe Bay were completely unacceptable. Such sentiments have no place in the Conservative Party. I deplore them and I apologise for them on behalf of my party."

In September 2005 (following the May general election), Winterton said she felt that Britain is a country where:

"Crime is out of control ... and where thousands of illegal immigrants are waved in with no checks on whether they are criminals or potential terrorists. [...] We live in times of tremendous change, but the United Kingdom is still, thankfully, a predominantly white, Christian country. [...] Some might say we are now paying the price for the so-called 'benefits' of the multicultural society, the product of almost uncontrolled immigration and the abuse of asylum."

Along with her husband, she managed to ask questions at Tony Blair's last Prime Minister's Questions in 2007.

== MPs' misuse of expenses ==
Together with Nicholas Winterton, Ann Winterton was investigated by the Parliamentary Commissioner for Standards, who concluded that they had misused their MPs' expenses to pay rent for a flat that they had already bought outright. The Wintertons transferred the ownership of the flat into a family trust to avoid the inheritance tax threshold. Since 2002, they had paid the rent for living in the flat from their MPs' expenditure. The Wintertons had declared their intentions to the Commons' Fees Office. On 25 May 2009, it was announced that both of the Wintertons would stand down as MPs at the following general election. Winterton was one of 98 MPs who voted in favour of legislation which would have kept MPs' expense details secret.

== Personal life ==
Winterton is also president of the Congleton Pantomime Society.

== Awards ==
- Cheshire Life Woman of the Year

== Bibliography ==
- Hames, Tim (2005). Times Guide to the House of Commons 2005. ISBN 978-0-00-721182-1.

Parliament of the United Kingdom
New constituency	Member of Parliament for Congleton; 1983 – 2010	Succeeded by Fiona Bruce
