= Nicholas Winterton =

British politician (born 1938)

Sir Nicholas Winterton
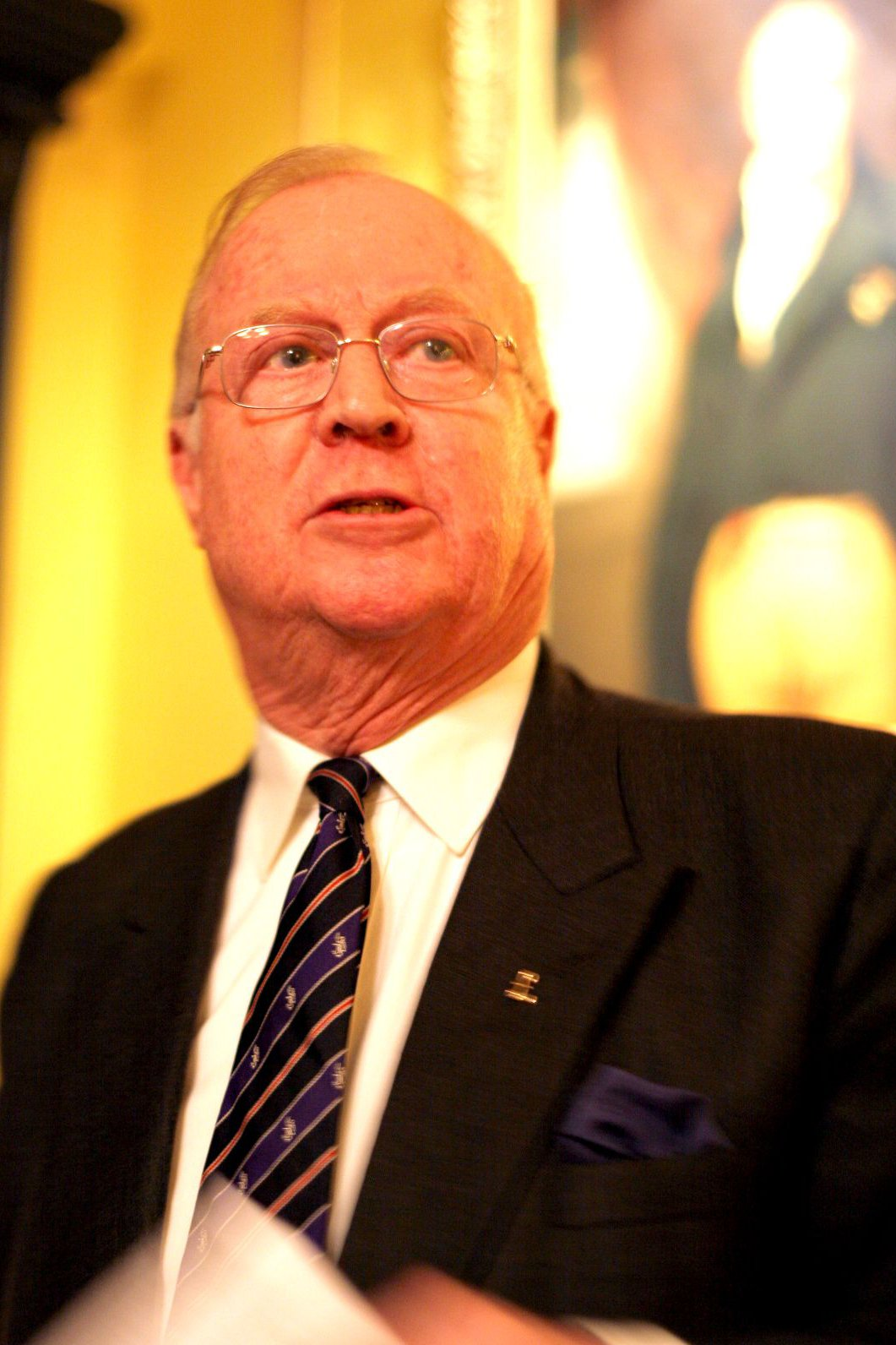
- Sir Nicholas Winterton in January 2010

Member of Parliament for Macclesfield
- In office 30 September 1971 – 12 April 2010
- Preceded by: Arthur Vere Harvey
- Succeeded by: David Rutley

Personal details
- Born: 31 March 1938 (age 88) Rugeley, Staffordshire, England
- Party: Conservative
- Spouse: Ann Winterton
- Children: 3

Military service
- Branch/service: British Army
- Years of service: 1957–1959
- Rank: Second Lieutenant
- Unit: 14th/20th King's Hussars

Sir Nicholas Raymond Winterton (born 31 March 1938) is a retired British Conservative Party politician. He was the Member of Parliament (MP) for Macclesfield from 1971 until he retired from the House of Commons at the 2010 general election.

His wife, Ann Winterton, also served as a Member of Parliament, representing the neighbouring Congleton constituency from 1983 to 2010.

== Early life ==
Winterton was born in Rugeley, Staffordshire and was educated at Bilton Grange, a prep school in Rugby, then Rugby School. He undertook his National Service from 1957 to 1959 and was commissioned into the 14th/20th King's Hussars serving in Germany before leaving to work as a trainee sales executive with Shell-Mex and BP.

In 1960, he became a Sales and General Manager of a construction machinery company, a job he retained until he was elected to Parliament. He served as a member of the West Midlands Conservative Council from 1967 to 1971 and was a Warwickshire County Councillor representing a coal mining and industrial division in North Warwickshire from 1967 to 1972. In 1969 he contested a by-election in Newcastle-under-Lyme but was unsuccessful; he stood again for the same seat at the 1970 general election but again was unsuccessful.

== Member of Parliament ==
Winterton was elected to the House of Commons at the third attempt, winning a by-election in Macclesfield in September 1971. He is considered a right-wing Conservative, opposing the reduction of the age of consent for same-sex sexual relations to 16, the ban on fox hunting and supporting Section 28 and the reintroduction of capital punishment.

For some years he was a member of the Conservative Monday Club and on 26 January 1981, he was the Guest-of-Honour at the club's Africa Group Dinner at St Stephen's Club, Westminster, where Harold Soref was in the chair. He is also a signatory to The Freedom Association's Better Off Out campaign, opposing Britain's membership of the European Union. He wears a small badge in the design of the pound sterling symbol to signify his opposition to any plans for the Euro being adopted as Britain's national currency. In the late 1980s he was with several other MPs a member of the parliamentary advisory board of far-right think tank the Western Goals Institute.

Although never promoted to a ministerial or shadow role, he served as a member of the Social services Select committee between 1979 and 1990 and was then chairman of the Health Select Committee (1990–92). Winterton was a member of the Speaker's Panel of Chairmen. He was also a member of the Select Committee on the Modernisation of the House of Commons and served as a vice-chairman of the 1922 Committee. Winterton was one of the few MPs to ask a question at Tony Blair's last Prime Minister's Questions: he demanded a referendum on the EU Reform Treaty.

In 2000 he ran to be Speaker of the House of Commons, he lost with 116 votes in favour and 340 votes against.

The Wintertons were investigated by the Parliamentary Standards Commissioner and he concluded that they misused their MPs' expenses to pay rent for a flat that they had already bought outright. Once the mortgage had been fully repaid, the Wintertons transferred the ownership of the flat into a family trust. Since 2002 they had paid the rent to their trust for living in the flat from their MPs' expenditure. The Committee accepted that the Wintertons had "at no stage attempted to conceal their arrangements". Winterton said of his expenses: "I try to tackle matters of expenses in a responsible way, I don't spend any more money than is absolutely necessary". This was at odds with his party's leader, David Cameron, who described them as "indefensible". On 25 May 2009 it was announced that both the Wintertons would stand down as MPs at the next general election.

Winterton was accused of slapping Labour MP Natascha Engel's bottom. When asked if the accusation was true, Winterton replied: "I'm quite a normal person. Will I slap a colleague on the back, Will I slap a colleague in friendship? The answer is – it is certainly possible."

On 18 February 2010 during a BBC Radio 5 Live interview he defended MPs travelling first class by saying that people who travelled in standard class on trains were a "totally different type of people." Commenting to a BBC reporter, a Conservative spokesman stated that these remarks "...do not in any way represent the views of [...] the Conservative Party."

== Affiliations ==
Sir Nicholas Winterton has been involved in a wide range of organisations and interests. Local charities he supports include the Macclesfield Access Group, the Multiple Sclerosis Society, Riding for the Disabled, Macclesfield Handicapped Social Club and the Rossendale Trust. He is a vice president of the East Cheshire Hospice and a patron of the local branch of the National Society for the Prevention of Cruelty to Children. For 30 years he has been a patron of the Macclesfield & District Sheep Dog Trials Association. He also helps local organisations such as Age Concern and Macmillan Cancer Care and is an honorary member of the Macclesfield & District Lions Club. He is a supporter of Macclesfield Town F.C. and Macclesfield R.U.F.C.

Winterton is also actively involved with local Scouting and Guiding. He is a vice president of Cheshire Scout County and Macclesfield and Congleton District Scout Council. He is an ambassador for Guiding by Girlguiding UK. In recognition of his contribution to Scouting he has been awarded the Medal of Merit for Outstanding Services to the Scout Movement.

For 26 years he was on The Duke of Edinburgh's Award Scheme National Advisory Committee. He is an honorary Vice-President of the Royal College of Midwives and a freeman of the City of London. He is also a Past Upper Bailiff and Member of Court of the Worshipful Company of Weavers. As a result of many years supporting St John Ambulance, Winterton is a Serving Brother of the Venerable Order of Saint John. He is Patron/Chairman of the Zimbabwe-Rhodesia Relief Fund, a registered charity.

== Personal life ==
Winterton is married to Ann Winterton. In the 1983 general election she became the Member of Parliament for Congleton, adjacent to his Macclesfield constituency. They have two children, including one daughter, Sarah.

== Honours ==
He was knighted by Elizabeth II in the 2002 Birthday Honours for services to Parliament.

In 2009, Winterton was made a Freeman of the Borough of Macclesfield.

Parliament of the United Kingdom
Preceded by Arthur Vere Harvey	Member of Parliament for Macclesfield; 1971 – 2010	Succeeded by David Rutley
