= Sarah Russell (politician) =

British politician

Sarah Russell MP
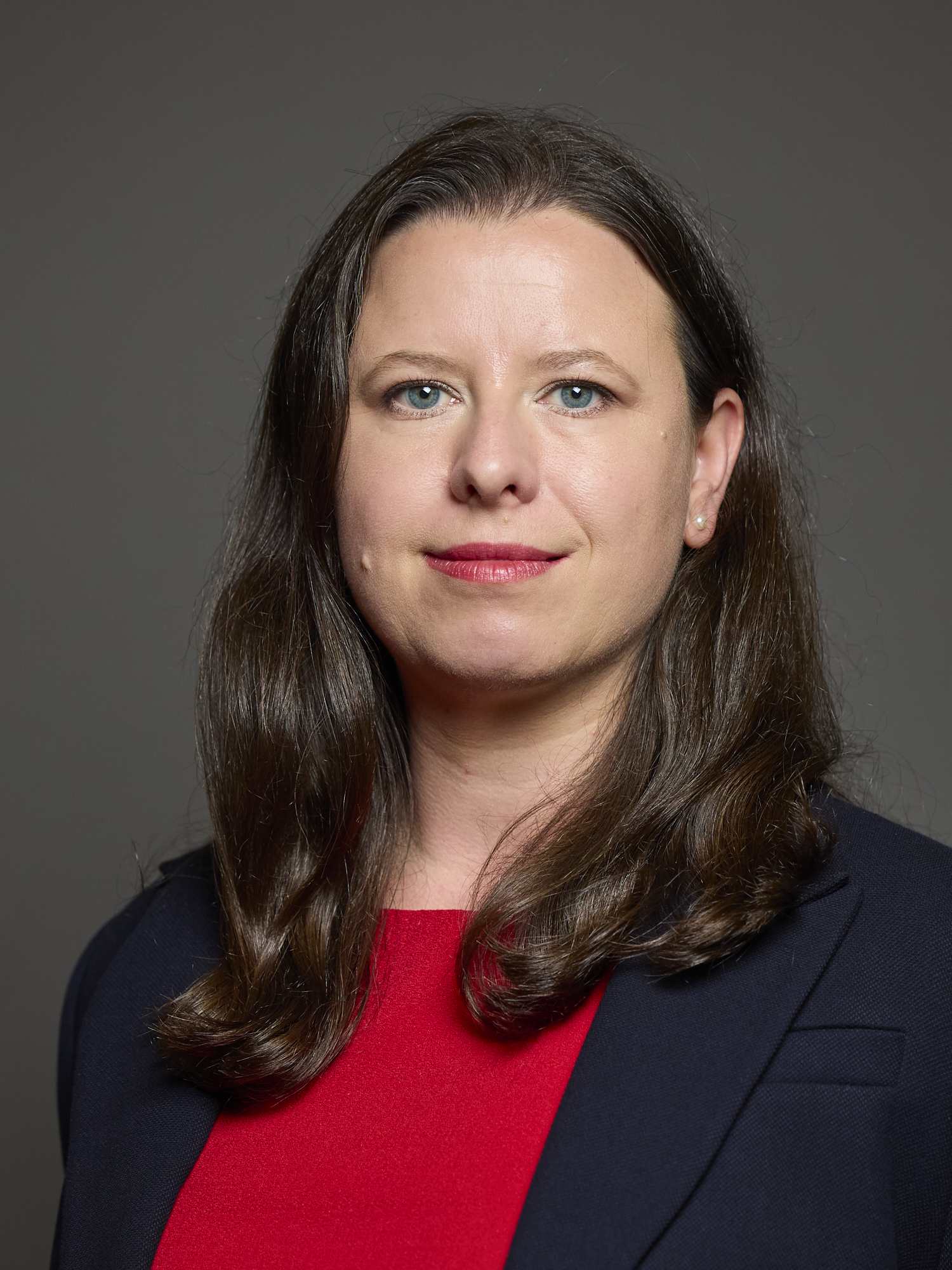
- Official portrait, 2024

Member of Parliament for Congleton
- Incumbent
- Assumed office 4 July 2024
- Preceded by: Fiona Bruce
- Majority: 3,387 (6.8%)

Personal details
- Party: Labour
- Children: 3
- Website: https://www.sarahrussellmp.org/

Sarah Alison Russell is a British Labour Party politician who has been the Member of Parliament for Congleton since 2024. She is the first non-Conservative politician to represent Congleton, having defeated the incumbent Conservative MP Fiona Bruce.

Russell is a solicitor and a former councillor in Manchester.

== Early life and career ==
Russell studied politics at the University of York, graduating in 2004. She then completed the Graduate Diploma in Law and Bar Vocational Course at BPP University, as well as a Master of Laws at King's College London.

While working as a paralegal at Pattinson & Brewer in London, she cross-qualified as a solicitor, developing a practice in employment law. She then worked for several years at Slater & Gordon before moving to Fox Whitfield and Rebel Law Ltd to work as a consultant solicitor.

Russell has also worked as a supervising solicitor at the Equality and Employment Law Centre. She served as a trustee of Benchill Community Centre and was a school governor at Rackhouse Primary.

== Political career ==
Between 2014 and 2023, Russell represented Northenden ward as a councillor on Manchester City Council. She served as chair of the council's Resources and Governance Scrutiny Committee as well as vice-chair of the Wythenshawe Community Housing Group.

In 2023 Russell was nominated as a possible Labour candidate for Crewe and Nantwich at the 2024 General Election, Russell was unsuccessful and Connor Naismith was selected as the prospective Labour candidate.

Russell later became chair of the Congleton Labour Party.

Ahead of the 2024 general election, Russell was selected as the prospective Labour candidate for Congleton. She was elected as MP with 37.7% of the vote and a majority of 3,387 votes. She overturned a majority of over 18,000 votes.

She is a member of the Fabian Society's executive committee.

== Personal life ==
Russell is married with three children and lives in Congleton.

Parliament of the United Kingdom
Preceded by Fiona Bruce	Member of Parliament for Congleton; 2024 – Present	Succeeded by Incumbent
