= Congleton (constituency) =

UK Parliament constituency (since 1983)

Coordinates: 53°9′N 2°16′W

- County constituency for the House of Commons
- Interactive map of boundaries since 2024
- Location within North West England
- County: Cheshire
- Electorate: 69,836 (March 2020)
- Major settlements: Congleton, Sandbach, Alsager, Holmes Chapel

Current constituency
- Created: 1983
- Member of Parliament: Sarah Russell (Labour Party)
- Seats: One
- Created from: Crewe, Macclesfield, Knutsford and Nantwich

Congleton is a parliamentary constituency in Cheshire, represented in the House of Commons of the UK Parliament since 2024 by Sarah Russell of the Labour Party. (Note: As with all constituencies, the constituency elects one Member of Parliament (MP) by the first past the post system of election at least every five years.) (Note: A county constituency (for the purposes of election expenses and type of returning officer))

== Constituency profile ==
The constituency adjoins the Stoke-on-Trent urban area and rural areas in all other directions, including the Peak District to the East, Staffordshire Moorlands to the South and Cheshire Plain to the West.

Congleton was considered a stronghold for the Conservative Party as the seat had elected a Conservative MP since its creation in 1983, with a majority of 32% in the 2019 general election. However, the constituency was won by Labour in the 2024 United Kingdom general election on a swing of over 21%. (Note: As with all constituencies, the constituency elects one Member of Parliament (MP) by the first past the post system of election at least every five years.)

The constituency consists mainly of rural areas of south-east Cheshire, with the only three towns being – in descending order of population – Congleton, Sandbach, and Alsager. The seat is also home to the large village of Holmes Chapel, as well as many much smaller villages and settlements, such as Church Lawton, Rode Heath and Goostrey.

== Creation ==
The constituency was created for the 1983 general election following the major reorganisation of local authorities under the Local Government Act 1972, which came into effect on 1 April 1974. It comprises parts of Macclesfield and the abolished constituencies of Crewe, Knutsford and Nantwich.

== Boundaries ==
=== Historic ===
==== 1983–1997 ====
- The Borough of Congleton, and the Borough of Crewe and Nantwich ward of Haslington.

The town of Congleton was previously in the constituency of Macclesfield; Alsager, Sandbach and Haslington, came from Crewe; Middlewich from Nantwich; and rural areas comprising the former Rural District of Congleton were previously part of Knutsford.

==== 1997–2010 ====
- The Borough of Congleton.

Haslington was transferred to Crewe and Nantwich.

==== 2010–2024 ====
The Parliamentary Constituencies (England) Order 2007 made no changes to Congleton. However, before this came into force for the 2010 election, the Borough of Congleton was abolished on 1 April 2009, becoming part of the new unitary authority of Cheshire East. Consequently, the constituency's boundaries were revised to:

- The Borough of Cheshire East wards of Alsager, Brereton Rural (most), Congleton East, Congleton West, Dane Valley, Middlewich, Odd Rode, Sandbach Elworth, Sandbach Ettiley Heath and Wheelock, Sandbach Heath and East, and Sandbach Town.

=== Current ===
Further to the 2023 review of Westminster constituencies, which came into effect for the 2024 general election, the constituency is composed of the following wards of the Borough of Cheshire East (as they existed on 1 December 2020):

- Alsager, Brereton Rural, Congleton East, Congleton West, Dane Valley, Odd Rode, Sandbach Elworth, Sandbach Ettiley Heath and Wheelock, Sandbach Heath and East, and Sandbach Town.

To bring the electorate within the permitted range, Middlewich was transferred to the new constituency of Mid Cheshire.

== Political history ==
Congleton was a stronghold for the Conservative Party, electing a Conservative MP from its creation in 1983 until 2024, with a majority of 32% in the 2019 UK General Election. (Note: As with all constituencies, the constituency elects one Member of Parliament (MP) by the first past the post system of election at least every five years.)

The seat was held comfortably from 1983 until 2010 by the Conservative Ann Winterton, the wife of Sir Nicholas Winterton, the MP for the adjacent Macclesfield constituency. Both stood down at the 2010 general election; their joint statement cited the hectic life of politics as part of their reason for standing down, in addition to an investigation by the Parliamentary Commissioner for Standards, who concluded that they misused their MPs' expenses to pay rent for a flat that they had already bought outright.

Ann Winterton was succeeded by Fiona Bruce at the 2010 general election. Fiona Bruce held the seat until the 2024 General Election when she was unseated by the current MP Sarah Russell.

== Members of Parliament ==
Election	Member	Party
1983	Ann Winterton	Conservative
2010	Fiona Bruce	Conservative
2024	Sarah Russell	Labour

== Elections ==
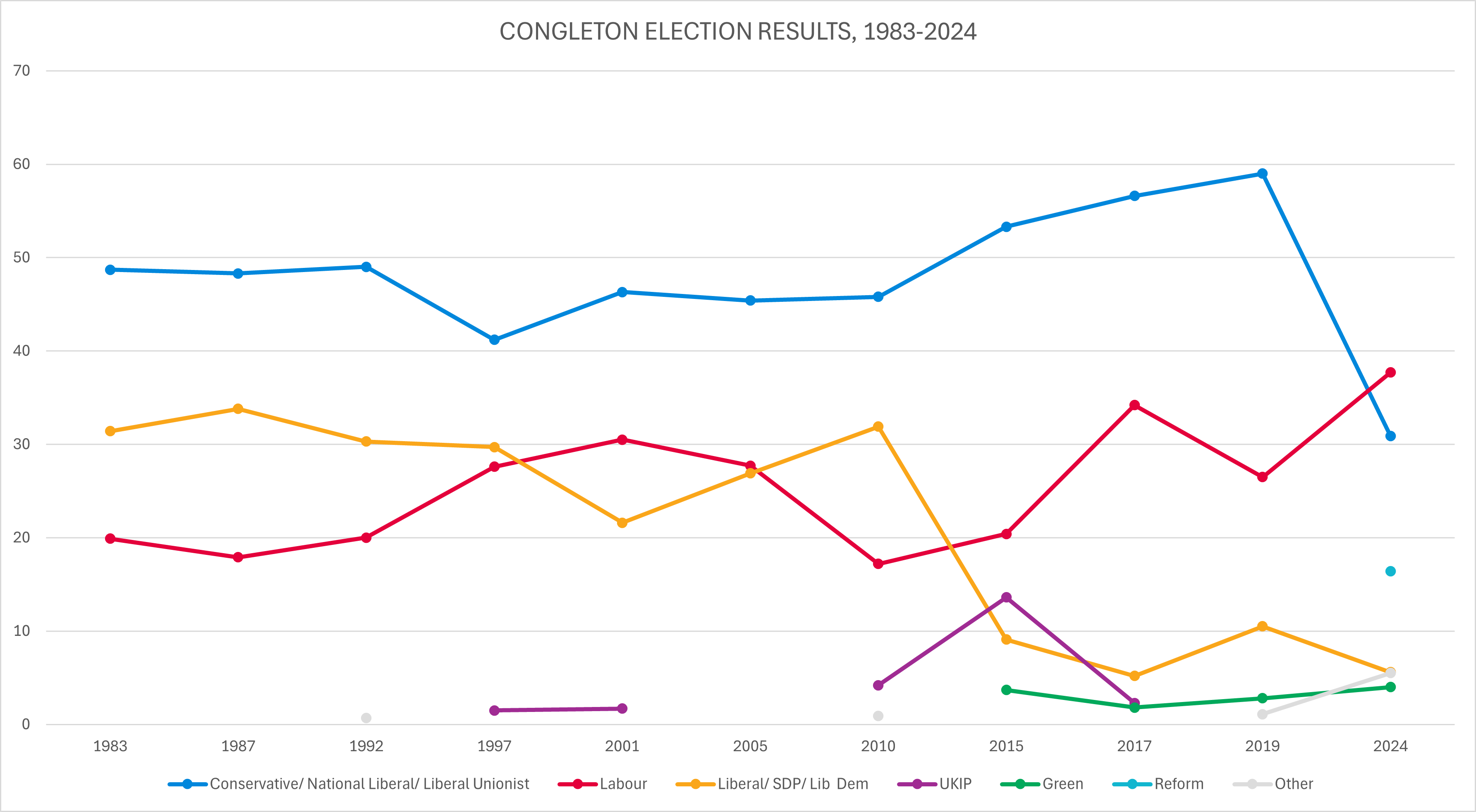
Election results 1983–2024

=== Elections in the 2020s ===
General election 2024: Congleton
Party	Candidate	Votes	%	±%
Labour	Sarah Russell	18,875	37.7	+13.6
Conservative	Fiona Bruce	15,488	30.9	−29.7
Reform	Martin York	8,245	16.4	N/A
Liberal Democrats	Paul Duffy	2,785	5.6	−5.5
Independent	Rob Moreton	2,181	4.4	N/A
Green	Richard McCarthy	2,007	4.0	+1.1
Women's Equality	Kay Wesley	544	1.1	N/A
Rejected ballots		153		
Majority		3,387	6.8	N/A
Turnout		50,125	67.5	−3.8
Labour gain from Conservative		Swing	+21.6	

Changes are from the notional 2019 results on the 2024 boundaries.

=== Elections in the 2010s ===
2019 notional result
Party	Vote	%
Conservative	30,207	60.6
Labour	12,004	24.1
Liberal Democrats	5,521	11.1
Green	1,423	2.9
Others	658	1.3
Turnout	49,813	71.3
Electorate	69,836	

General election 2019: Congleton
Party	Candidate	Votes	%	±%
Conservative	Fiona Bruce	33,747	59.0	+2.4
Labour	Jo Dale	15,186	26.5	−7.7
Liberal Democrats	Paul Duffy	6,026	10.5	+5.3
Green	Richard McCarthy	1,616	2.8	+1.0
Animal Welfare	Jane Smith	658	1.1	N/A
Majority		18,561	32.5	+10.1
Turnout		57,233	70.7	–2.6
Conservative hold		Swing	+5.0	

General election 2017: Congleton
Party	Candidate	Votes	%	±%
Conservative	Fiona Bruce	31,830	56.6	+3.3
Labour	Sam Corcoran	19,211	34.2	+13.8
Liberal Democrats	Peter Hirst	2,902	5.2	−3.9
UKIP	Mark Davies	1,289	2.3	−11.3
Green	Alec Heath	999	1.8	−1.9
Majority		12,619	22.4	−10.5
Turnout		56,231	73.3	+2.9
Conservative hold		Swing	−5.2	

General election 2015: Congleton
Party	Candidate	Votes	%	±%
Conservative	Fiona Bruce	27,164	53.3	+7.5
Labour	Darren Price	10,391	20.4	+3.2
UKIP	Lee Slaughter	6,922	13.6	+9.4
Liberal Democrats	Peter Hirst	4,623	9.1	−22.8
Green	Alec Heath	1,876	3.7	N/A
Majority		16,773	32.9	+19.0
Turnout		50,976	70.4	+1.5
Conservative hold		Swing	+2.2	

General election 2010: Congleton
Party	Candidate	Votes	%	±%
Conservative	Fiona Bruce	23,250	45.8	+0.4
Liberal Democrats	Peter Hirst	16,187	31.9	+5.0
Labour	David Bryant	8,747	17.2	−10.5
UKIP	Lee Slaughter	2,147	4.2	N/A
Independent	Paul Edwards	276	0.5	N/A
Independent	Paul Rothwell	94	0.2	N/A
Independent	Adam Parton	79	0.2	N/A
Majority		7,063	13.9	−3.8
Turnout		50,780	68.9	+4.8
Conservative hold		Swing	−2.3	

=== Elections in the 2000s ===
General election 2005: Congleton
Party	Candidate	Votes	%	±%
Conservative	Ann Winterton	21,189	45.4	−0.9
Labour	Nicholas Milton	12,943	27.7	−2.8
Liberal Democrats	Eleanor Key	12,550	26.9	+5.3
Majority		8,246	17.7	+1.9
Turnout		46,682	64.2	+1.5
Conservative hold		Swing	+0.9	

General election 2001: Congleton
Party	Candidate	Votes	%	±%
Conservative	Ann Winterton	20,872	46.3	+5.1
Labour	John Flanagan	13,738	30.5	+2.9
Liberal Democrats	David Lloyd-Griffiths	9,719	21.6	−8.1
UKIP	Bill Young	754	1.7	+0.2
Majority		7,134	15.8	+4.3
Turnout		45,083	62.7	−14.9
Conservative hold		Swing	+1.1	

=== Elections in the 1990s ===
General election 1997: Congleton
Party	Candidate	Votes	%	±%
Conservative	Ann Winterton	22,012	41.2	−7.3
Liberal Democrats	Joan Walmsley	15,882	29.7	−2.0
Labour	Helen Scholey	14,713	27.6	+8.4
UKIP	John Lockett	811	1.5	N/A
Majority		6,130	11.5	−7.2
Turnout		53,418	77.6	−6.9
Conservative hold		Swing	−3.6	

General election 1992: Congleton
Party	Candidate	Votes	%	±%
Conservative	Ann Winterton	29,163	49.0	+0.7
Liberal Democrats	Iain Brodie-Browne	18,043	30.3	−3.5
Labour	Matthew Finnegan	11,927	20.0	+2.1
Natural Law	Peter Brown	399	0.7	N/A
Majority		11,120	18.7	+4.2
Turnout		59,532	84.5	+4.0
Conservative hold		Swing	+2.1	

=== Elections in the 1980s ===
General election 1987: Congleton
Party	Candidate	Votes	%	±%
Conservative	Ann Winterton	26,513	48.3	−0.4
Liberal	Iain Brodie-Browne	18,544	33.8	+2.4
Labour	Michael Knowles	9,810	17.9	−2.0
Majority		7,969	14.5	−2.8
Turnout		54,867	80.5	+3.6
Conservative hold		Swing	−1.4	

General election 1983: Congleton
Party	Candidate	Votes	%	±%
Conservative	Ann Winterton	23,895	48.7	
Liberal	Clive Smedley	15,436	31.4	
Labour	Eric Gill	9,783	19.9	
Majority		8,459	17.3	
Turnout		49,114	76.9	
Conservative win (new seat)				

== See also ==
- List of parliamentary constituencies in Cheshire
- History of parliamentary constituencies and boundaries in Cheshire
