= Fiona Bruce (politician) =

British former politician (born 1957)

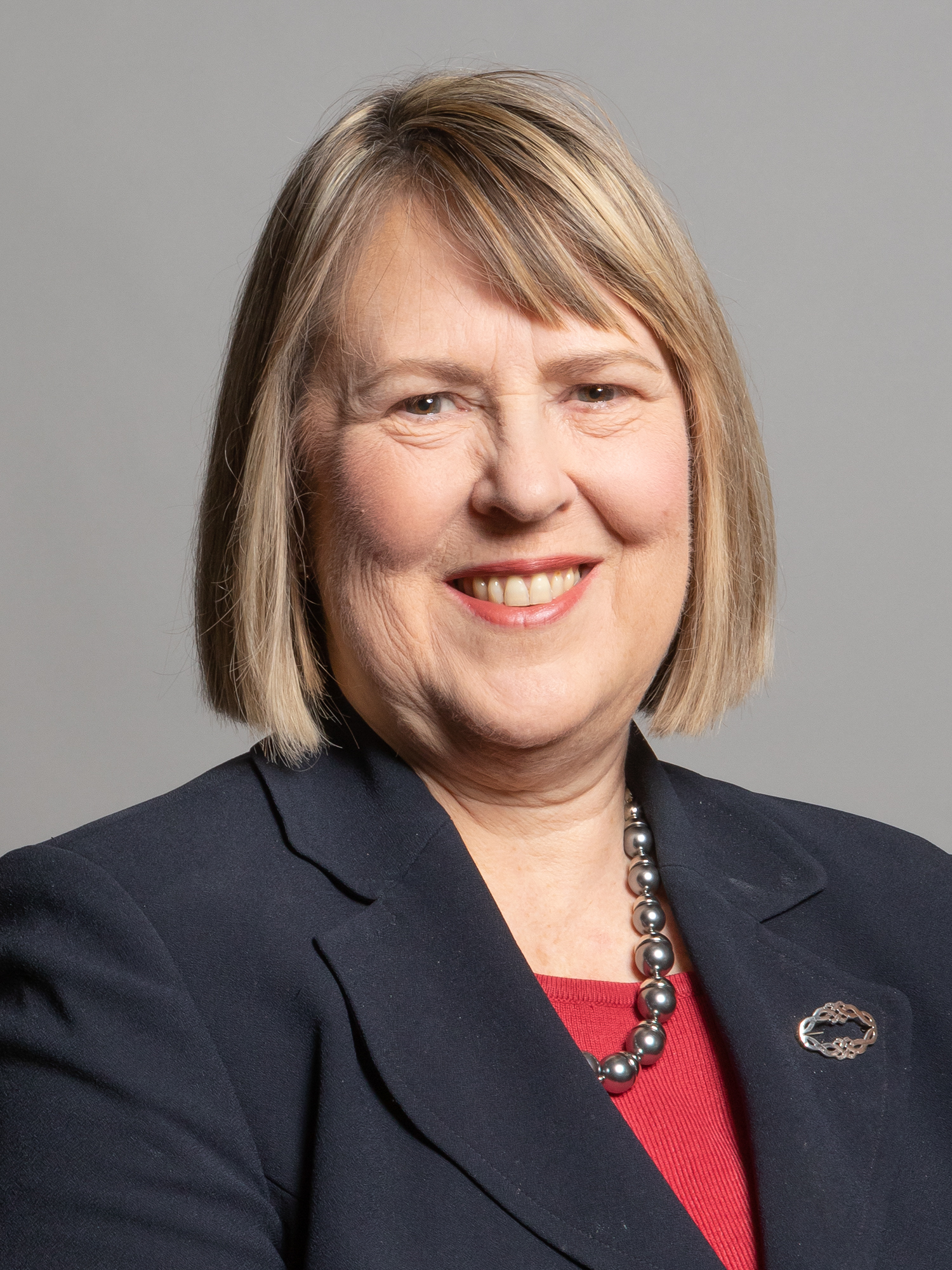
- Official portrait, 2020

Prime Minister's Special Envoy for Freedom of Religion or Belief
- In office 20 December 2020 – 5 July 2024
- Prime Minister: Boris Johnson; Liz Truss; Rishi Sunak
- Preceded by: Rehman Chishti
- Succeeded by: David Smith (as UK's Special Envoy for Freedom of Religion or Belief)

Member of Parliament for Congleton
- In office 6 May 2010 – 30 May 2024
- Preceded by: Ann, Lady Winterton
- Succeeded by: Sarah Russell

Personal details
- Born: Fiona Claire Riley; 26 March 1957 (age 69) Wick, Caithness, Scotland
- Party: Conservative
- Children: 2
- Education: Victoria University of Manchester
- Website: Official Website at the Wayback Machine (archived 2024-05-01) parliament.fiona-bruce

Fiona Claire Bruce (née Riley; born 26 March 1957) is a British former Conservative Party politician who served as the Member of Parliament (MP) for Congleton from 2010 to 2024.

== Early life and education ==
Fiona Riley was born on 26 March 1957 in Wick, Caithness, Scotland to Allan Stewart and Greta Riley (née Scott). She attended Burnley High School for Girls, and the private Howell's School, Llandaff in Cardiff. Riley then studied law at the Victoria University of Manchester and further studies at Chester Law College.

She was admitted as a solicitor in 1981, and has been senior partner of the firm, Fiona Bruce & Co in Warrington, since its formation in 1988.

== Political career ==
Bruce was elected in 2004 to Warrington Borough Council representing the Ward Penketh & Cuerdley. As a Councillor, she served as Executive Member for Finance from 2006 to 2009. She stepped down from the Council upon her election to Parliament in May 2010.

Bruce contested Warrington South in the 2005 general election, finishing second with 33% of the vote behind the incumbent Labour MP Helen Southworth.

In 2006 Bruce was placed on the Conservative A-List of priority parliamentary candidates following efforts by the Conservative Women2Win mentoring and pressure group.

Following her selection as the Conservative Party candidate for Congleton, Bruce denied allegations that she had been chosen following an orchestrated campaign by religious groups sympathetic to her evangelical Christian beliefs.

At the 2010 general election, Bruce was elected as MP for Congleton with 45.8% of the vote and a majority of 7,063.

Bruce was a member of the Scottish Affairs Select Committee from 2010 to 2024.

In February 2015, Bruce introduced an amendment to the Serious Crime Bill 2014 to make abortion on the grounds of the sex of the baby illegal. The amendment was rejected by 292 votes to 201.

In February 2015 Bruce described "defending and fighting for the sanctity of human life" as her priority in Parliament.

At the 2015 general election, Bruce was re-elected as MP for Congleton with an increased vote share of 53.3% and an increased majority of 16,773.

Bruce supported Brexit in the 2016 referendum.

At the snap 2017 general election, Bruce was again re-elected, with an increased vote share of 56.6% and a decreased majority of 12,619.

In 2019, Bruce chaired an inquiry by the Conservative Party Human Rights Commission into prostitution, which made the recommendation to replace existing laws on soliciting prostitution with laws that would make paying for sexual services a criminal offence.

Bruce was again re-elected at the 2019 general election, with an increased vote share of 59% and an increased majority of 18,561.

In 2020, she was appointed by Boris Johnson as the Prime Minister's Special Envoy for Freedom of Religion or Belief, and in this capacity was supportive of a petition to grant asylum to Maira Shahbaz and her family, a Pakistani Christian girl who has received death threats.

In May 2021 Bruce co-authored an essay entitled "Family Matters – the Case for Strengthening Families" with former MP, David Burrowes, for inclusion in Common Sense: Conservative Thinking for a Post-Liberal Age published by the Common Sense Group, an informal group of Conservative MPs.

In 2022, Bruce was elected as Chair of the International Religious Freedom or Belief Alliance, a network of countries promoting freedom of religion or belief worldwide. She was re-elected for a second term in 2023.

In January 2023, Sky News revealed that Bruce had, since the 2019 general election, earned more than £700,000 in addition to her salary as an MP; the fourth-highest amount of any MP.

In July 2023, she spoke out against the persecution of Christians during the ongoing violence in Manipur, India.

Bruce lost her seat at the 2024 General Election.

== Personal life ==
She married Richard John Bruce in 1990, and they have two sons. Fiona Bruce was awarded the title of "Small Businesswoman of the Year" in 2003.

Bruce is an Evangelical Alliance council member.

Parliament of the United Kingdom
Preceded by Ann Winterton	Member of Parliament for Congleton; 2010 – 2024	Succeeded by Sarah Russell
