= Brocklehurst =

Brocklehurst may refer to:

In geography:

- Brocklehurst, Kamloops, British Columbia, Canada
- Brocklehurst Secondary School, Kamloops, British Columbia

In people:

- Andrew Brocklehurst (born 1983), British rugby player
- Ben Brocklehurst (1922–2007), English cricketer and publisher
- Danny Brocklehurst (born 1971), English screenwriter
- John Brocklehurst (politician) (1788–1870), English silk manufacturer, banker and Liberal Party politician
- John Brocklehurst, 1st Baron Ranksborough (1852–1921), British soldier, courtier and Liberal politician
- John Brocklehurst (footballer) (1927–2005), English footballer
- Philip Brocklehurst (1887–1975), British member of Ernest Shackleton's Nimrod Expedition to Antarctica, grandson of John Brocklehurst (politician)
- William Brocklehurst Brocklehurst (1851–1929), English politician and businessman
- William Coare Brocklehurst (1811–1900), English politician and businessman

In literature:

- Mr. Henry Brocklehurst, a character in Jane Eyre by Charlotte Brontë
- Imogen Brocklehurst, a character in Imogen

== See also ==
- Mark Dent-Brocklehurst
- Brockenhurst, Hampshire, United Kingdom
- Lester Brockelhurst
