= John Brocklehurst =

John Brocklehurst may refer to:

- John Brocklehurst (politician) (1788–1870), Liberal MP
- John Brocklehurst, 1st Baron Ranksborough (1852–1921), British soldier and politician
- John Brocklehurst (footballer) (1927–2005), English footballer
