= Emma Dent =

English antiquarian and collector (1823–1900)

- Born: Emma Brocklehurst; 23 April 1823; Macclesfield, Cheshire, England
- Died: 22 February 1900 (aged 76); Sudeley, Winchcombe, Gloucestershire, England
- Occupations: antiquarian, collector
- Years active: 1840s–90s
- Spouse: John Coucher Dent

Emma Dent (née Brocklehurst; 23 April 1823 – 22 February 1900) was an English antiquarian and collector who restored and developed Sudeley Castle in Gloucestershire.

Dent corresponded with some of the most famous names and eminent thinkers of the 19th century. She planned the layout of the gardens at Sudeley and oversaw their creation. She was an authority on the locality, publishing a lengthy account and documenting antiquities. She also acquired many fine antiques, and amassed a large collection of autographs, as well as a world-class collection of lace and needlework.

== Life ==
Emma Brocklehurst was born in April 1823, one of four daughters and four sons of John Brocklehurst and Emma Coare. Sent to be tutored in London, at the age of fourteen she attended Queen Victoria's coronation, and four years later in 1841 was presented at court by Lady Stanley of Alderley. In 1852, she and her husband travelled to London for the state funeral of the Duke of Wellington.

She spent most of her life restoring Sudeley Castle in Gloucestershire, having married John Coucher Dent, the heir to the property, a romantic ruin purchased by his uncles in 1837. John and William Dent had already completed a significant restoration. Emma and her husband inherited the castle in 1855. John Coucher Dent, and particularly Emma, insisted on continuing the restoration.

After her husband's death, Emma was able to increase her direct involvement, with the North Lodge and Tithe Barn, an ambitious plan to add terracing around the moat, a new West gateway and adjoining buildings, and finally the North Tower, replacing an earlier one shown on drawings of the original castle. A reliable source lists her achievement as having significantly expanded the gardens and having "substantially enlarged the house and its services ... she remodelled the western side of the castle through the full length of both courtyards, overbuilding one section of the ruins, and beginning a new tower at its north-east corner in March 1890".

Locally in northern Gloucestershire she enjoyed the company of the Hanbury-Tracey family of Toddington Manor (whose heads were raised to the peerage as the Barons Sudeley from 1838), Lord Elcho and other local gentry.

She continued the Dent uncles' tradition of hosting large events at Sudeley, including in the Conservative interest: the Blue Ball of January 1854 attended by nearly 600 people celebrated a by-election victory, (Note: Michael Hicks-Beach's victory in East Gloucestershire.) and at a historical party in January 1859 she and her husband entertained in the guise of Henry VIII and Katherine Parr. (Note: "The hospitality of Sudeley was proverbial in the whole county of Gloucester and on this occasion it surpassed itself: a lamb roasted whole graced the bottom of the table; a gigantic woodcock pie the top; two peacocks glittered in their tails and plumage on the side and among the other more conspicuous dishes were a boar's head and a roast cygnet.")

Emma Dent was an active correspondent (Note: She wrote 1,600 letters between March 1869 and October 1870.) and was known in her lifetime as an avid collector and antiquarian. Inspired by visiting the 1862 International Exhibition, she collected coins, stamps and curiosities from throughout the world. Her most lasting legacy is the gardens at Sudeley, a re-creation in historical style, in keeping with the remains of the castle. She published a substantial account of the history of the locality and for seven years towards the end of her life a monthly local magazine. (Note: The Winchcombe and Sudeley Record ran from 1890–96 and included announcements of births, marriages and deaths, a collection of local superstitions over 16 issues, and learned articles on local excavations.)

Her mark on the neighbouring Cotswold town of Winchcombe was perhaps even greater. The Dent Almshouses and Dent School were built in the 1860s and restoration, enlargement, and construction of other buildings in the town followed; she also helped renovate the parish church. She had the road from the town to the castle (now Vineyard Street) completely rebuilt in the 1890s. To commemorate Queen Victoria's Golden Jubilee, she had St. Kenelm's Well on the Sudeley estate restored to provide tapped water to the town. Ten years later, Emma spent £400 constructing open-air public swimming baths. Further afield she started a small school in nearby Gretton and used her share of a legacy to build the church there.

Emma adopted the Tory politics of her husband's family, having grown up in a Liberal household. Although unable to vote herself, she campaigned energetically for the Conservatives, to the extent of falling out with those in Winchcombe who had different views. Small electorates made for tight elections and she engaged in what she described as 'gerrymandering', selling houses which conveyed votes. She wrote circulars to the electorate, (Note: For example in the 1885 parliamentary election, and in 1889 to female voters, who still without a parliamentary vote were able to vote for the first time in the County Council elections that year.) was a supporter of women's suffrage, and also a member of the National Anti-Vivisection Society.

== Family ==
Dent's father, John Brocklehurst, was a silk manufacturer and banker, who served as MP for Macclesfield from 1832 to 1868. He was succeeded as Macclesfield's Liberal MP by her eldest brother William. Her younger brother Philip was created a baronet in 1903. Her younger sister Marianne was an English traveller and collector of Egyptian antiquities who supported a number of Egyptian excavations in the 1870s–90s.

John Brocklehurst withheld his consent to marriages proposed by both Emma and subsequently Marianne; both broke off the engagements. Although Emma took exception in the latter case, interceding on her sister's behalf, she bore her father no lasting ill will, after his death commissioning a marble bust which she presented to Macclesfield Town Hall along with an "In Memoriam" book.

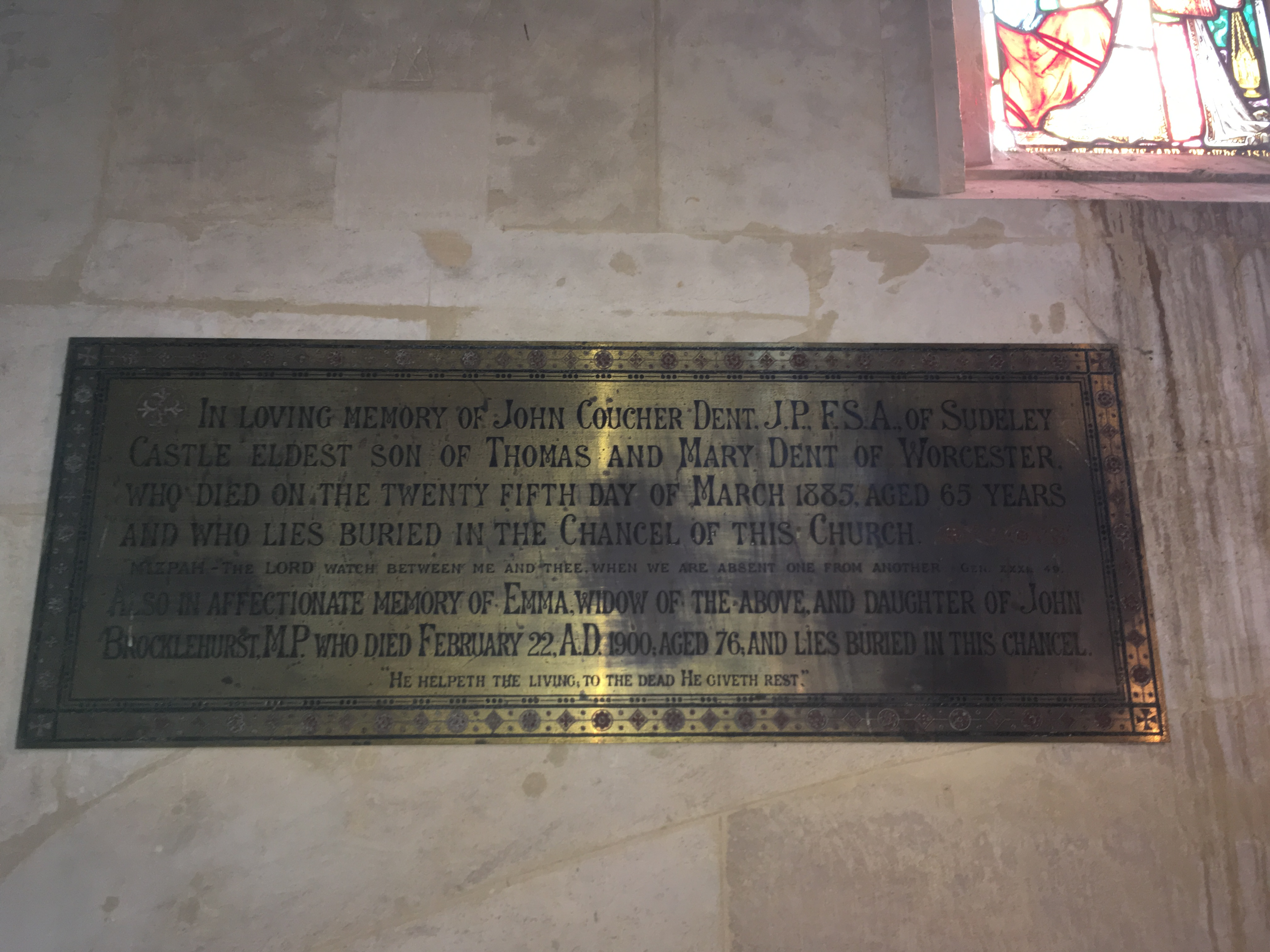
Memorial to John Coucher Dent and Emma Dent in the Chapel at Sudeley

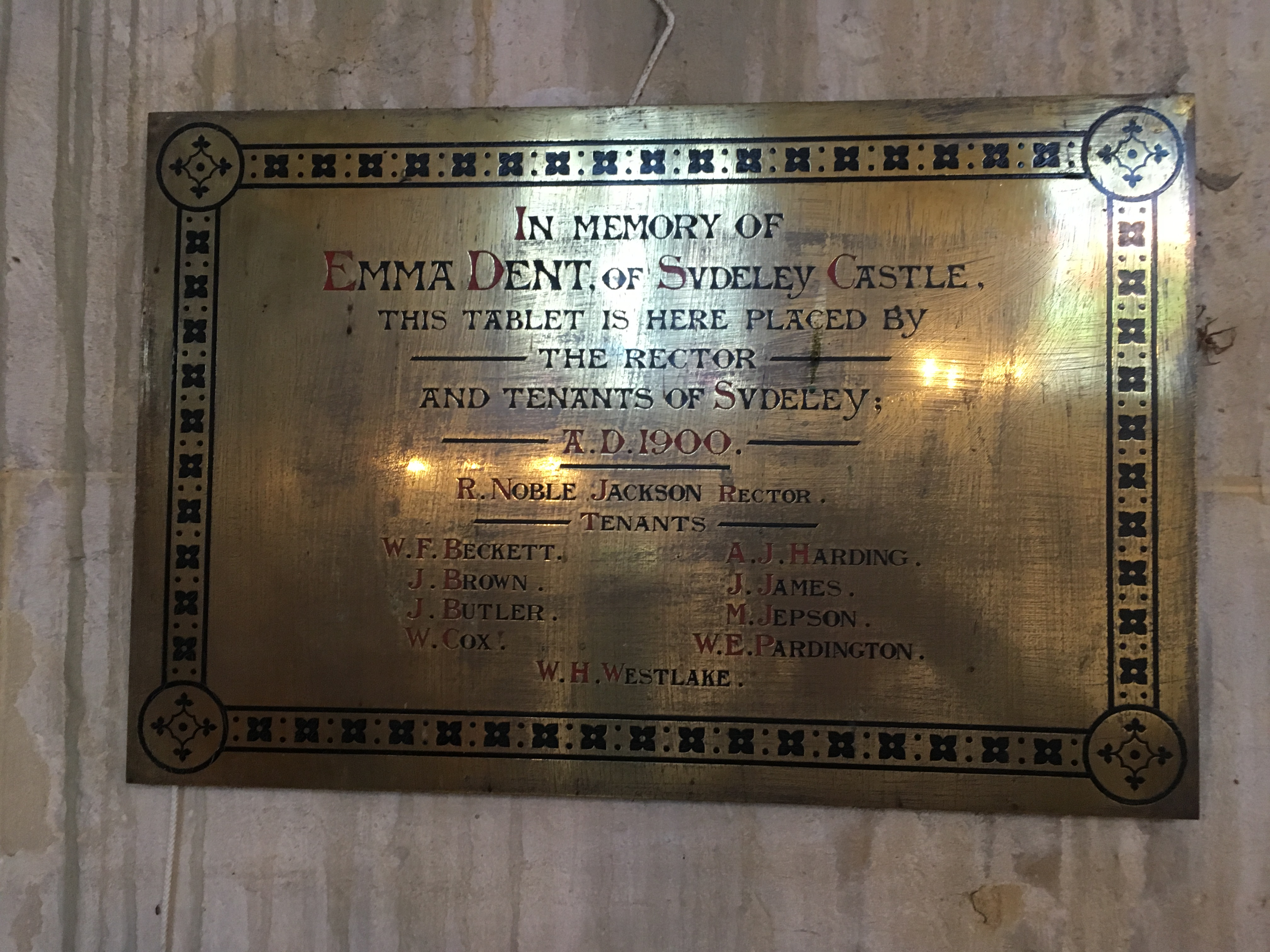
Memorial to Emma Dent in the Chapel at Sudeley

== Marriage and private life ==
On 16 September 1847, Emma married John Coucher Dent, a barrister. He was due to inherit Sudeley Castle from his uncles, glove makers from Worcester, who had bought the property in a derelict state ten years previously. The Dents spent an eventful honeymoon travelling in Italy and Malta dodging revolutionary turmoil before settling in Worcestershire, and enjoyed a number of other travels around Europe together, hurrying back from the 1870 Passion Play at Oberammergau on hearing that France had declared war on Prussia. In 1857, Emma suffered a miscarriage, but the couple had no children. John had gout and a choleric temperament to match. Emma was dismayed by his rages but angry at the gossip and rumours which circulated among friends and servants that he was violent to her. John Dent died on 25 March 1885, leaving Sudeley to Emma's use in her lifetime. (Note: The Dent family was extinguished, so John's will made provision for it to pass after Emma's death to her brother's son, Harry Dent Brocklehurst, and his male descendants.)

== Photograph ==
There is a photograph taken of her by Camille Silvy as an albumen print on the 4 July 1862, in the National Portrait Gallery.

== Death and memorials ==
Emma Dent died on 22 February 1900 and is commemorated on two brass plaques in the chapel at Sudeley: one with her husband, the other a tribute from the rector and tenants. She was cremated in England's first and only crematorium, at Woking, attended only by her nephew and successor at Sudeley, Harry Dent-Brocklehurst.
