= William Brocklehurst =

William Brocklehurst may refer to:

- William Brocklehurst (politician, born 1818) (1818–1900), businessman and Liberal Party politician from Macclesfield, MP 1868–1880 and 1885–1886
- William Brocklehurst (politician, born 1851) (1851–1929), businessman and Liberal Party politician from Macclesfield, MP 1906–1918
