= West Park, Macclesfield =

Park in Macclesfield, Cheshire, England

West Park
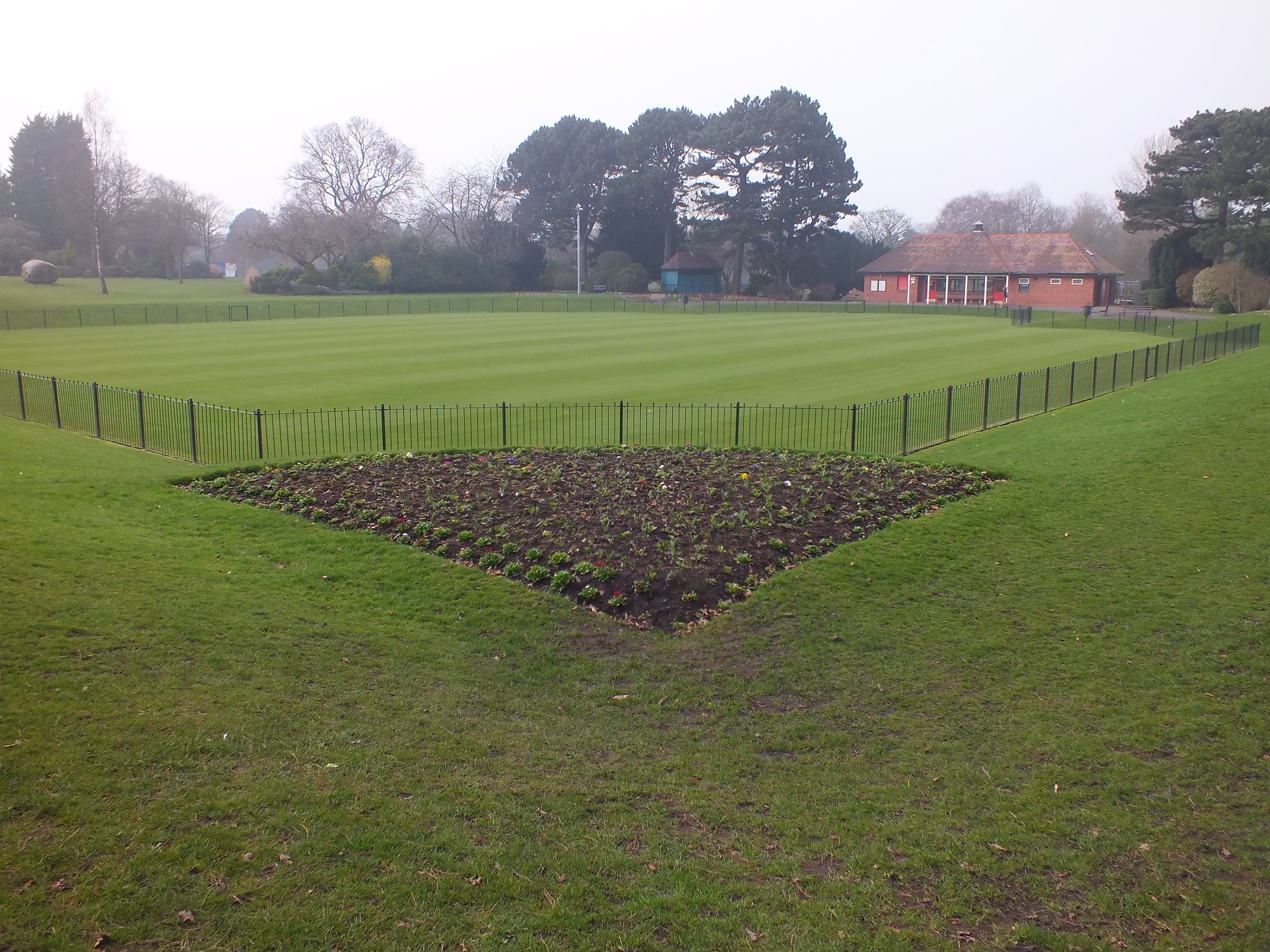
- The bowling green
- Interactive map of West Park
- Location: Macclesfield, Cheshire
- OS grid: SJ 91047 74057
- Coordinates: 53°15′49.8″N 2°08′07.9″W
- Area: 6.2 hectares (15 acres)
- Opened: 1854
- Designer: William Barron
- Designation: Grade II
- Website: visitmacclesfield.co.uk/listing/west-park/

West Park is a public park in Macclesfield, in Cheshire, England, about 0.5 kilometres (0.3 mi) north-west of the town centre. It was opened in 1854, and is listed Grade II in Historic England's Register of Parks and Gardens.

== History ==
The park was created as a result of a movement among working-men's clubs in Macclesfield for a memorial to the former Prime Minister Robert Peel, who had died in 1850. John May, a councillor who had organised the first works outing to Blackpool from Macclesfield, proposed that money collected should be used not to erect a statue but to create a public park.

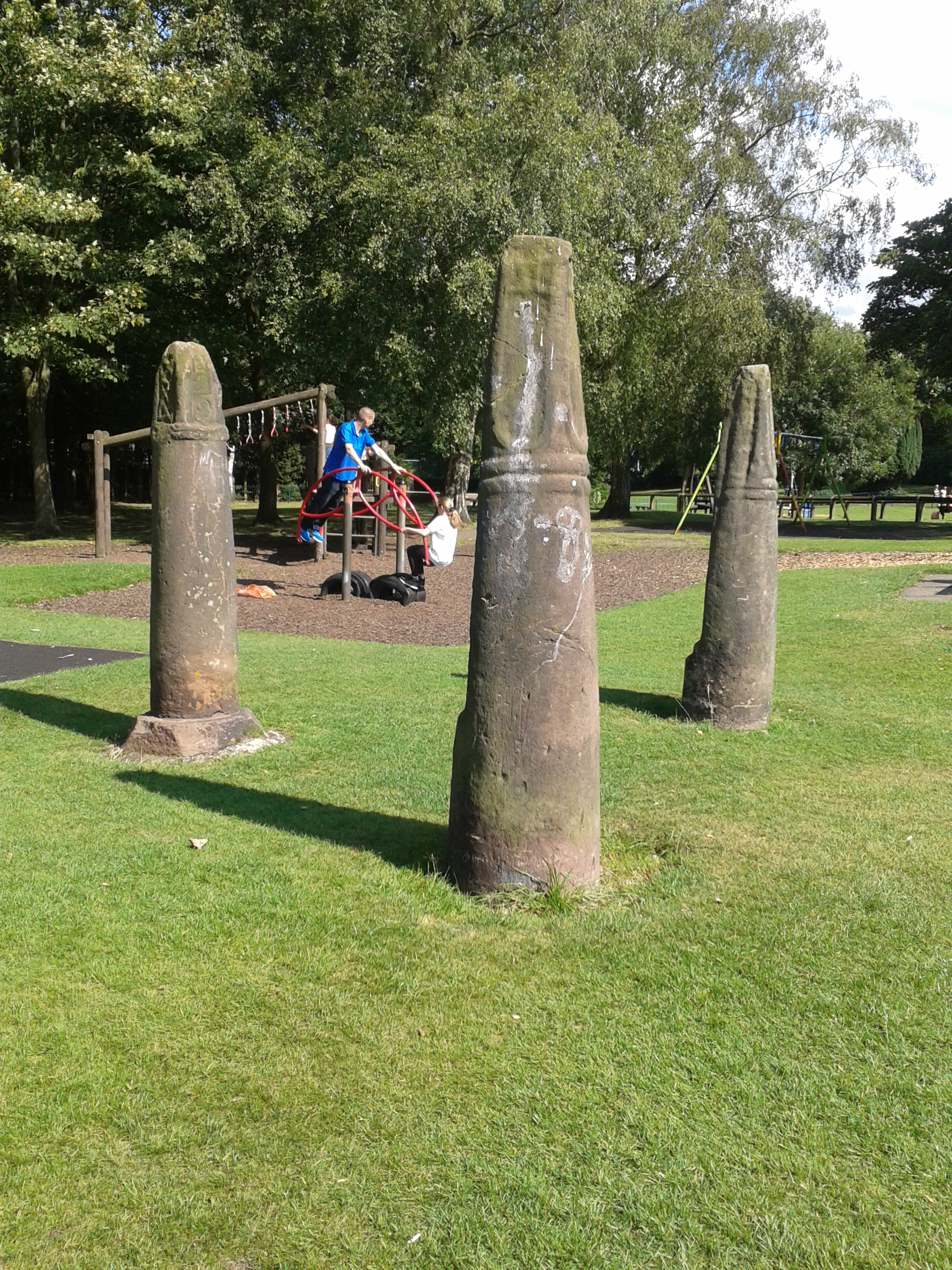
The medieval crosses

After a public meeting in 1853, an area of land known as Town Field, and 8 acres (3.2 ha) from the Westbrook Estate, were purchased. Work on the park started early in 1854. It was designed by William Barron; he had redesigned the gardens of Elvaston Castle, residence of the Earl of Harrington who owned land near Macclesfield. The park, known then as Peel Park, was opened on 2 October 1854.

Two Russian cannons captured in the Crimean War were placed in the park in 1857. They were removed during the Second World War.

Three early medieval cross shafts, formerly at Ridge Hall Farm in Sutton Lane Ends, were moved to the park by 1864. They are at the intersection of two paths in the east of the park, and are a scheduled monument. They date from the late 9th or early 10th century; there are similar crosses at Wincle and Astbury.

West Park Museum, situated to the north of the main entrance, was opened in 1898. It was donated to the town by Marianne Brocklehurst, a collector of Egyptian antiquities. The building, of brick with terracotta dressings and a clerestory, is Grade II listed.

== Description and facilities ==
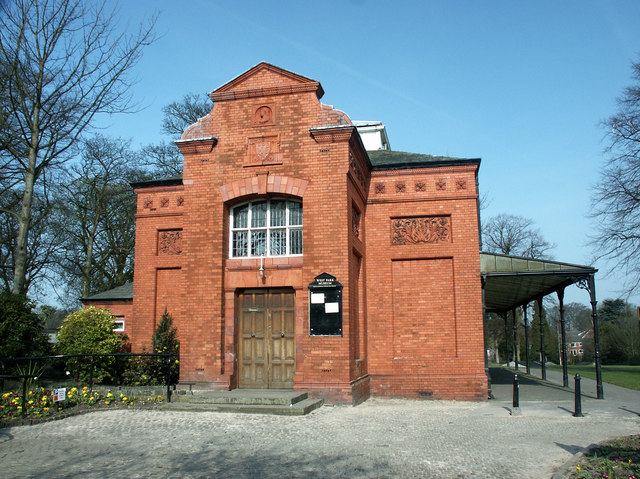
The museum

The area of the park is 6.2 hectares (15 acres). The main entrance is on Prestbury Road; from here there is a driveway through the park towards the location where once stood Westbrook House, now demolished. Westbrook House and its grounds were originally intended as part of the park, but were not included on its opening in 1854. East of the driveway there are informal paths around a bowling green, said to be one of the largest in England, which is overlooked by a grass terrace.

West of the driveway there is an open area for games, around which there are winding paths. A skateboard track is situated near the museum. There are mature trees enclosing the open areas.

Other facilities include a children's play area, a café, a picnic area and ornamental gardens.
