= Tim Roca =

British Labour MP

Tim Roca MP
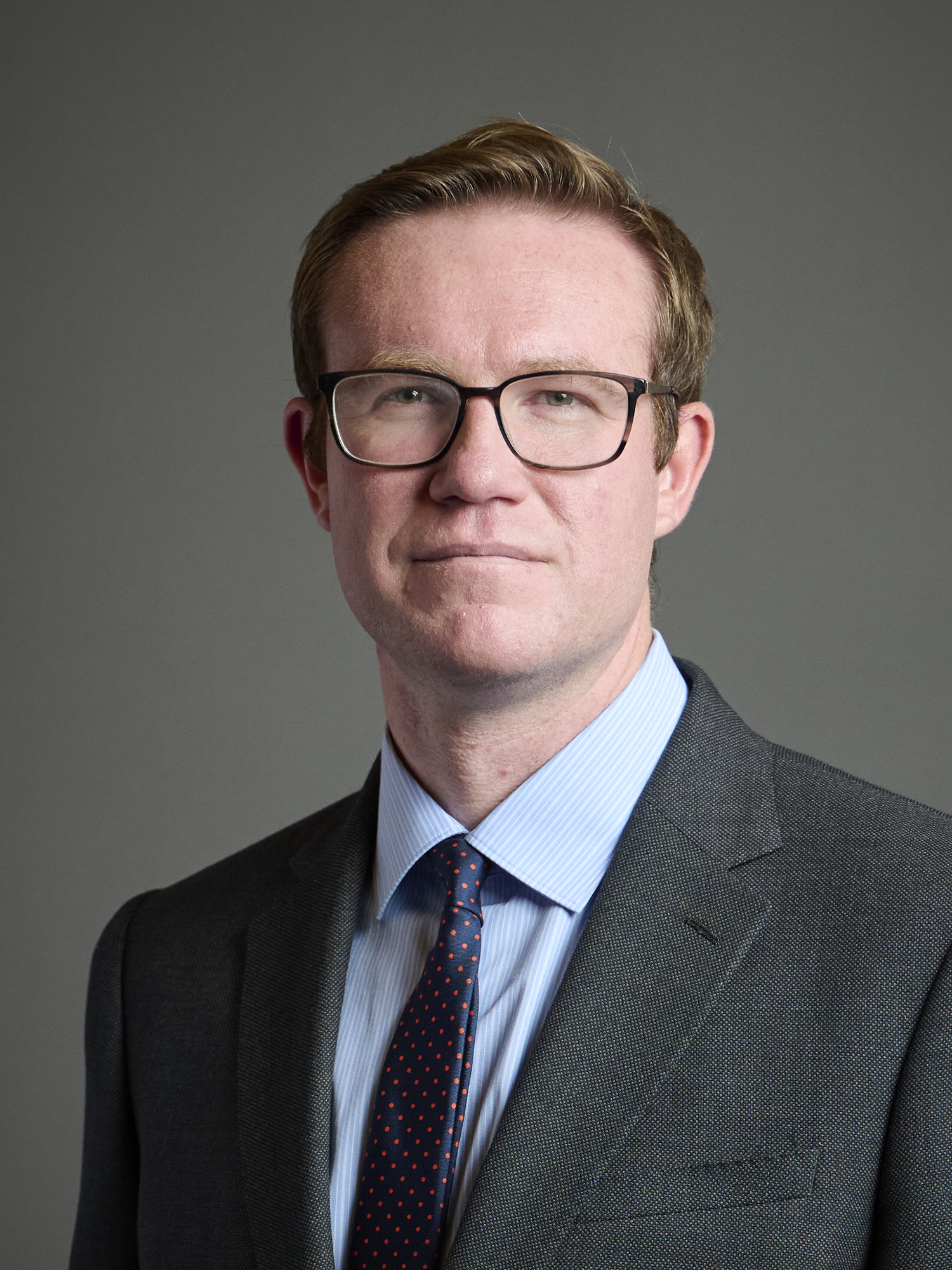
- Official portrait, 2024

Member of Parliament for Macclesfield
- Incumbent
- Assumed office 4 July 2024
- Preceded by: David Rutley
- Majority: 9,120 (18.5%)

Deputy Leader of Westminster City Council
- In office May 2022 – January 2024

Member of Westminster City Council for Harrow Road
- In office May 2018 – August 2024

Personal details
- Born: Juan Timothy Charles Roca; 14 November 1985 (age 40) Stockport, Greater Manchester, England
- Party: Labour
- Education: Poynton High School
- Alma mater: Lancaster University

Juan Timothy Charles Roca (born 14 November 1985) is a British Labour Party politician who has been the Member of Parliament for Macclesfield since 2024, when he gained the seat from the Conservative Party. Roca is the first ever Labour MP for Macclesfield, which had been held by the Conservative Party since 1918.

== Early life and education ==
Roca grew up in Cheshire, England, attending Disley Primary School and Poynton High School. Roca studied history at Lancaster University, where he was president of the Students' Union for the 2007/2008 year.

== Career ==
After graduating from Lancaster University, Roca pursued a career in higher education. He worked at King's College London before joining the University of Westminster, where he served as a senior manager. Alongside his professional career, he held roles in the Local Government Association including leading the employers' national pay negotiations with trade unions between 2023 and 2024.

At the May 2014 Westminster City Council election, Roca was one of Labour's three candidates for the St James's ward. However, all three seats were comfortably held by the Conservative Party.

Tim Roca subsequently stood as the Labour candidate for Macclesfield in Cheshire at the May 2015 general election. Although he increased Labour's vote share, the Conservative Party held the seat with a 29.8% majority.

In July 2015, Roca was elected to represent Harrow Road ward (centred on the street of that name) on Westminster City Council in a by-election. He was subsequently re-elected at the 2018 and 2022 local elections and stood down in August 2024. He has served as Cabinet Member for Young People and Learning, and, until January 2024, as deputy leader of the council.

Roca was selected as the Labour candidate for Macclesfield at the 2024 general election, and this time took the seat from the Conservatives, who had represented the constituency since 1918.

Roca was appointed President of the Silk Heritage Trust (custodians of the Silk Museum in Macclesfield) in February 2025 and is also Vice President of East Cheshire Hospice.

Tim Roca serves as an officer of several All-Party Parliamentary Groups (APPGs). He is Chair of the All-Party Parliamentary Group on Spain, which seeks to promote relations between the United Kingdom and Spain, including parliamentary, business and cultural links. He is also Vice Chair of the All-Party Parliamentary Group on Arbitrary Detention and Hostage Affairs, which focuses on the arbitrary detention of British citizens overseas and the taking of hostages for state leverage, and advocates for improved government support for affected individuals and their families. In addition, Roca serves as Vice Chair of the All-Party Parliamentary Group on Rearmament, which examines the United Kingdom's defence capabilities and promotes discussion on defence, deterrence and national resilience.

He is also a patron of APARU, the Association of Argentine professionals in the United Kingdom.

In April 2025, Roca was sanctioned by Russia alongside 14 other Members of Parliament for speaking against the war in Ukraine.

In May 2026, was appointed parliamentary private secretary to the Department for Work and Pensions.

== Personal life ==
Roca identifies as gay.

Parliament of the United Kingdom
Preceded by David Rutley	Member of Parliament for Macclesfield; 2024–present	Incumbent
