= Macclesfield (constituency) =

Parliamentary constituency in the United Kingdom, 1885 onwards

Coordinates: 53°19′N 2°8′W

- County constituency for the House of Commons
- Interactive map of boundaries since 2010
- Location within North West England
- County: Cheshire
- Electorate: 75,881 (March 2020)
- Major settlements: Macclesfield, Poynton, Bollington and Prestbury

Current constituency
- Created: 1885
- Member of Parliament: Tim Roca (Labour)
- Seats: One
- Created from: East Cheshire

1832–1885
- Seats: Two
- Type of constituency: Borough constituency
- Created from: Cheshire
- Replaced by: East Cheshire

Macclesfield is a parliamentary constituency (Note: A county constituency (for the purposes of election expenses and type of returning officer)) in Cheshire represented in the House of Commons of the UK Parliament since 2024 by Tim Roca of the Labour Party. (Note: As with all constituencies, the constituency elects one Member of Parliament (MP) by the first past the post system of election at least every five years.)

== Constituency profile ==
Macclesfield is a constituency in Cheshire. It is centred on the town of Macclesfield, which has a population of around 56,000. Other settlements in the constituency include the small towns of Poynton and Bollington and the villages of Prestbury and Disley. Macclesfield is a historic market town and was traditionally an important centre for silk-weaving, an industry that was also present in Bollington. The constituency is highly affluent, particularly so in Poynton, Prestbury and the north of Macclesfield which have very low levels of deprivation. The area is well-connected to nearby Manchester and is popular with retirees and middle-class commuters. House prices are similar to the national average and higher than the rest of North West England.

In general, residents of the constituency are older, well-educated and more likely to be homeowners than the rest of the country. Rates of income and professional employment are high, and a high proportion of residents work in the health, manufacturing and scientific sectors. Rates of unemployment and child poverty are very low. White people made up 95% of the population at the 2021 census. At the local council, Macclesfield is represented by Labour Party councillors whilst the rest of the constituency elected mostly Conservatives. An estimated 52% of voters in the constituency supported remaining in the European Union in the 2016 referendum, higher than the nationwide figure of 48%.

== History 1832–1885 ==
Macclesfield was created as a two-member parliamentary borough by the Reform Act 1832. This continued until 1880 when, after problems at the general election that year, it was decided to declare the election void and suspend the writ of election (so no by-election could take place).

In September 1880 a Royal Commission was appointed to investigate further. A report of March 1881 confirmed the allegations of corruption. As a result, the borough constituency was disenfranchised, taking effect on 25 June 1885, and the town was absorbed into the East Cheshire constituency.

== Boundaries ==
=== Historic (since 1885) ===
1885–1918: The Municipal Boroughs of Congleton and Macclesfield, and parts of the Sessional Divisions of Northwich and Prestbury.

In 1885, under the Redistribution of Seats Act 1885, the Macclesfield constituency was recreated with extended boundaries as one of eight new divisions of the county of Cheshire. From the 1885 general election it has continued to elect one MP until the present day.

1918–1950: The Municipal Boroughs of Congleton and Macclesfield, the Urban Districts of Bredbury and Romiley, Buglawton, Compstall, Marple, and Yeardsley-cum-Whaley, the Rural District of Disley, in the Rural District of Congleton the civil parishes of Hulme Walfield and Newbold Astbury, and part of the Rural District of Macclesfield.

Expanded along the eastern border of Cheshire, gaining Disley and Yeardley-cum-Whaley from Knutsford, and Bredbury and Romiley, Compstall, and Marple from the abolished constituency of Hyde.

1950–1974: The Municipal Boroughs of Congleton and Macclesfield, the Urban District of Bollington, and the Rural Districts of Disley and Macclesfield.

The Urban Districts of Bredbury and Romiley (which had absorbed most of Compstall), and Marple were included in the new constituency of Cheadle. Bollington and the part of the Rural District of Macclesfield not previously in the constituency, including Poynton, were transferred from Knutsford. The Urban District of Yeardsley-cum-Whaley had been abolished and partly absorbed into Disley, and Buglawton had been absorbed into the Municipal Borough of Congleton. Other minor changes.

1974–1983: The Municipal Boroughs of Congleton and Macclesfield, the Urban Districts of Alderley Edge and Bollington, and the Rural Districts of Disley and Macclesfield.

Alderley Edge transferred from Knutsford.

From 1 April 1974 until the next boundary review came into effect for the 1983 general election, the constituency comprised parts of the newly formed Boroughs of Congleton and Macclesfield, but its boundaries were unchanged.

1983–1997: The Borough of Macclesfield wards of Alderley Edge, Bollington Central, Bollington East, Bollington West, Disley, Gawsworth, Henbury, Macclesfield Central, Macclesfield East, Macclesfield North East, Macclesfield North West, Macclesfield South, Macclesfield West, Nether Alderley, Poynton Central, Poynton East, Poynton West, Prestbury, Rainow, and Sutton.

The parts of the Borough of Congleton (comprising the former Municipal Borough thereof) were included in the new constituency of Congleton. Otherwise, only marginal changes to the boundaries.

1997–2010: The Borough of Macclesfield wards of Bollington Central, Bollington East, Bollington West, Disley, Gawsworth, Henbury, Macclesfield Central, Macclesfield East, Macclesfield North East, Macclesfield North West, Macclesfield South, Macclesfield West, Poynton Central, Poynton East, Poynton West, Prestbury, Rainow, and Sutton.

=== Current ===
The Parliamentary Constituencies (England) Order 2007 made only marginal changes to Macclesfield. However, before this came into force for the 2010 election, the Borough of Macclesfield was abolished on 1 April 2009, becoming part of the new unitary authority of Cheshire East. Consequently, the constituency's boundaries were revised to:

- The Cheshire East Borough wards of Bollington, Broken Cross & Upton, Disley, Gawsworth, Macclesfield Central, Macclesfield East, Macclesfield Hurdsfield, Macclesfield South, Macclesfield Tytherington, Macclesfield West & Ivy, Poynton East & Pott Shrigley, Poynton West & Adlington, Prestbury, and Sutton.

The 2023 review of Westminster constituencies left the boundaries unchanged.

The constituency currently covers the north-eastern part of the Cheshire East unitary authority, including the town of Macclesfield itself and the area surrounding it, such as Bollington and Prestbury, as well as Disley and Poynton. Much of the constituency is commuter territory for Manchester.

== Recent political history ==
Macclesfield had long been considered to be a safe seat for the Conservative Party, having been held by them since the 1918 general election.

Most areas in the towns of Macclesfield itself and Bollington have leant towards Labour or the Liberal Democrats and previously the Liberal Party; Prestbury, Gawsworth, Poynton and the swathe of countryside that makes up a significant proportion of the seat have historically returned large majorities for the Conservative Party.

2017–present

Since the 2017 general election, however, the constituency has been a target seat for Labour, after they achieved a 7% swing in that election.

In the 2019 local elections, the Conservatives lost every councillor they had in the town of Macclesfield, with Labour making significant gains in areas they had never won before. The Conservatives largely maintained their vote outside Macclesfield, except in Bollington and Disley, in which they came third behind Labour and Independent candidates.

The 2019 general election saw a 2% swing to the Conservative Party, the national average swing was 4.5%.

In the 2024 general election, Labour won the seat for the first time in its history, on a substantial swing of over 18.5%.

EU Referendum

During the 2016 EU membership referendum, the constituency voted narrowly to remain in the EU, despite the UK overall voting to leave. Around 7,000 constituents subsequently signed a petition calling for a second referendum.

== Members of Parliament ==
=== MPs 1832–1850: Macclesfield Parliamentary Borough ===
From 1832 until 1885, Macclesfield was represented by two members of parliament.

| Election | 1st Member | 1st Party | 2nd Member | 2nd Party |
|---|---|---|---|---|
| 1832 | John Brocklehurst | Whig | John Ryle | Conservative |
| 1837 | John Brocklehurst | Whig | Thomas Grimsditch | Conservative |
| 1847 | John Brocklehurst | Whig | John Williams | Radical |
| 1852 | John Brocklehurst | Whig | Edward Egerton | Conservative |
| 1859 | John Brocklehurst | Liberal | Edward Egerton | Conservative |
| 1868 | William Brocklehurst | Liberal | David Chadwick | Liberal |
| 1880 | writ suspended | | | |

=== MPs since 1885: Macclesfield county constituency ===
- The Macclesfield constituency was recreated in 1885, and subsequently has elected one MP only.

| Election | Member | Party | Notes |
|---|---|---|---|
| 1885 | William Brocklehurst | Liberal | Member for Macclesfield (borough) (1868–1885) |
| 1886 | William Bromley-Davenport | Conservative | Financial Secretary to the War Office (1902–05) |
| 1906 | William B Brocklehurst | Liberal | |
| 1918 | John Remer | Conservative | Resigned 6 November 1939 |
| 1939 by-election | W. Garfield Weston | Conservative | |
| 1945 | Arthur Harvey | Conservative | Chair of the 1922 Committee (1966–1970) |
| 1971 by-election | Nicholas Winterton | Conservative | |
| 2010 | David Rutley | Conservative | Parliamentary Under-Secretary of State for Americas, Caribbean and Overseas Territories (2022–2024) |
| 2024 | Tim Roca | Labour | |

Sir Nicholas Winterton was first elected as the Conservative MP at a by-election in 1971 and held the seat until his retirement as an MP on the dissolution of the House of Commons in April 2010. Both Sir Nicholas and his wife Ann, Conservative MP for Congleton from 1983 to 2010, announced that they would not be candidates at the general election. On 17 October 2009 David Rutley was selected as the Conservative candidate by way of an open primary organised by the party and on 6 May 2010 was elected MP with an increased majority.

== Election results 1974–present ==
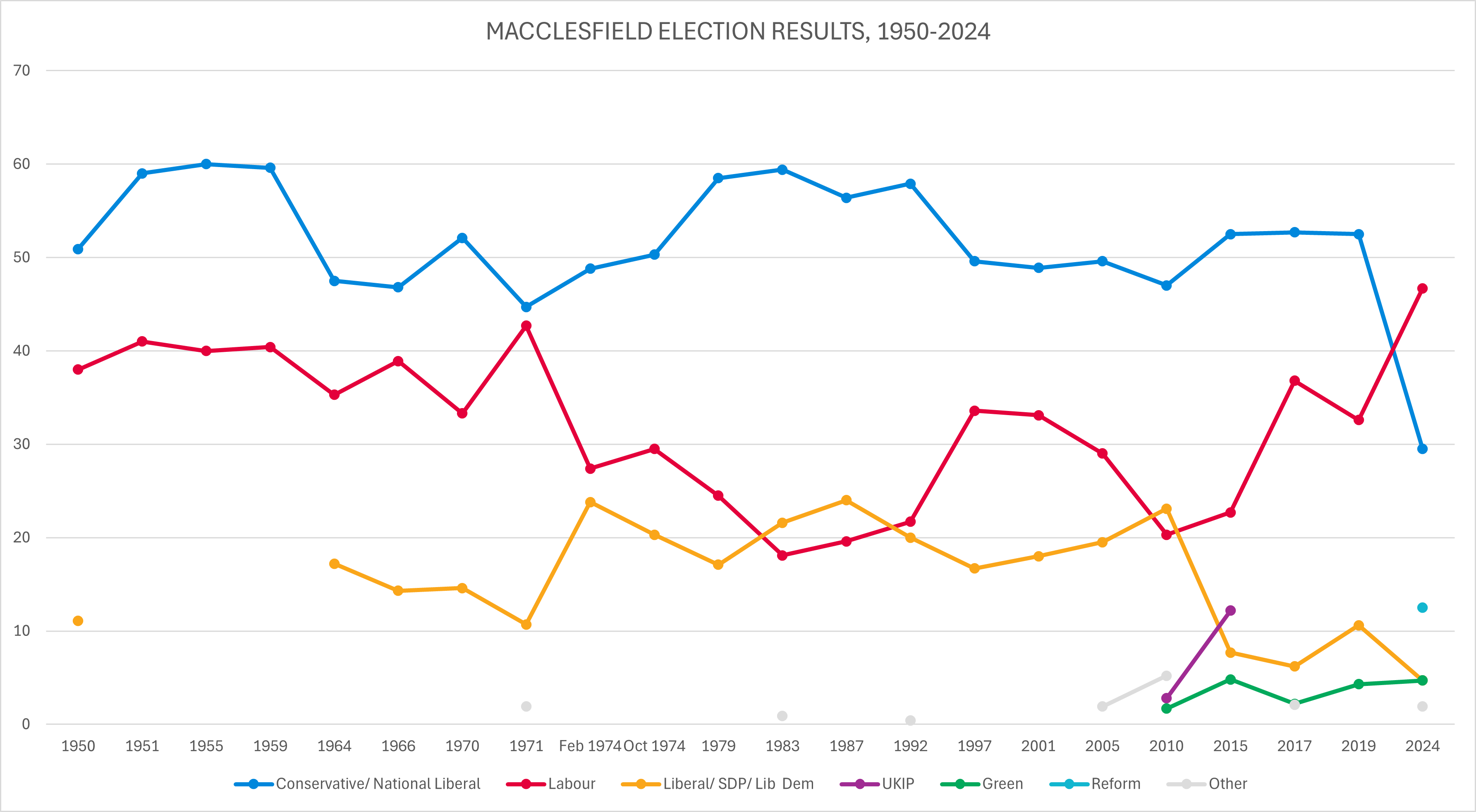
Election results 1950-2024

=== Elections in the 2020s ===
General election 2024: Macclesfield
| Party | Candidate | Votes | % | ±% |
|---|---|---|---|---|
| Labour | Tim Roca | 24,672 | 46.7 | +14.1 |
| Conservative | David Rutley | 15,552 | 29.5 | −23.1 |
| Reform | Stephen Broadhurst | 6,592 | 12.5 | N/A |
| Green | Amanda Iremonger | 2,493 | 4.7 | +0.4 |
| Liberal Democrats | Neil Christian | 2,482 | 4.7 | −5.9 |
| Independent | Chris Wellavize | 779 | 1.5 | N/A |
| SDP | Dickon Fletcher | 222 | 0.4 | N/A |
| Rejected ballots | | 153 | | |
| Majority | | 9,120 | 17.3 | N/A |
| Turnout | | 52,792 | 69.1 | −1.6 |
| Registered electors | | 76,416 | | +0.3 |
| Labour gain from Conservative | | Swing | +18.6 | |

=== Elections in the 2010s ===
General election 2019: Macclesfield
| Party | Candidate | Votes | % | ±% |
|---|---|---|---|---|
| Conservative | David Rutley | 28,292 | 52.5 | −0.2 |
| Labour | Neil Puttick | 17,581 | 32.6 | −4.2 |
| Liberal Democrats | Neil Christian | 5,684 | 10.6 | +4.4 |
| Green | James Booth | 2,310 | 4.3 | +2.1 |
| Majority | | 10,711 | 19.9 | +4.0 |
| Turnout | | 53,867 | 70.7 | −1.5 |
| Registered electors | | 76,216 | | +1.3 |
| Conservative hold | | Swing | +2.0 | |

General election 2017: Macclesfield
| Party | Candidate | Votes | % | ±% |
|---|---|---|---|---|
| Conservative | David Rutley | 28,595 | 52.7 | +0.1 |
| Labour | Neil Puttick | 19,987 | 36.8 | +14.1 |
| Liberal Democrats | Richard Flowers | 3,350 | 6.2 | −1.6 |
| Green | James Booth | 1,213 | 2.2 | −2.6 |
| Independent | Mark Johnson | 1,162 | 2.1 | N/A |
| Majority | | 8,608 | 15.9 | −13.9 |
| Turnout | | 54,307 | 72.2 | +3.0 |
| Registered electors | | 75,228 | | +4.7 |
| Conservative hold | | Swing | −7.0 | |

General election 2015: Macclesfield
| Party | Candidate | Votes | % | ±% |
|---|---|---|---|---|
| Conservative | David Rutley | 26,063 | 52.5 | +5.6 |
| Labour | Tim Roca | 11,252 | 22.7 | +2.4 |
| UKIP | Adrian Howard | 6,037 | 12.2 | +9.3 |
| Liberal Democrats | Neil Christian | 3,842 | 7.7 | −15.3 |
| Green | Joan Plimmer | 2,404 | 4.8 | +3.2 |
| Majority | | 14,811 | 29.8 | +5.9 |
| Turnout | | 49,598 | 69.3 | +1.0 |
| Registered electors | | 71,712 | | –2.4 |
| Conservative hold | | Swing | +1.6 | |

General election 2010: Macclesfield
| Party | Candidate | Votes | % | ±% |
|---|---|---|---|---|
| Conservative | David Rutley | 23,503 | 47.0 | −2.7 |
| Liberal Democrats | Roger Barlow | 11,544 | 23.1 | +3.5 |
| Labour | Adrian Heald | 10,164 | 20.3 | −8.7 |
| Independent | Brendan Murphy | 2,590 | 5.2 | N/A |
| UKIP | Jacqueline Smith | 1,418 | 2.8 | N/A |
| Green | John Knight | 840 | 1.7 | N/A |
| Majority | | 11,959 | 23.9 | +3.3 |
| Turnout | | 50,059 | 68.31 | +5.2 |
| Registered electors | | 73,417 | | +0.2 |
| Conservative hold | | Swing | −3.1 | |

=== Elections in the 2000s ===
General election 2005: Macclesfield
| Party | Candidate | Votes | % | ±% |
|---|---|---|---|---|
| Conservative | Nicholas Winterton | 22,628 | 49.6 | +0.7 |
| Labour | Stephen Carter | 13,227 | 29.0 | −4.1 |
| Liberal Democrats | Catherine O'Brien | 8,918 | 19.5 | +1.5 |
| Veritas | John Scott | 848 | 1.9 | N/A |
| Majority | | 9,401 | 20.6 | +4.8 |
| Turnout | | 45,621 | 63.1 | +0.8 |
| Registered electors | | 72,267 | | –1.2 |
| Conservative hold | | Swing | +2.4 | |

General election 2001: Macclesfield
| Party | Candidate | Votes | % | ±% |
|---|---|---|---|---|
| Conservative | Nicholas Winterton | 22,284 | 48.9 | −0.7 |
| Labour | Stephen Carter | 15,084 | 33.1 | −0.6 |
| Liberal Democrats | Michael Flynn | 8,217 | 18.0 | +1.3 |
| Majority | | 7,200 | 15.8 | −0.2 |
| Turnout | | 45,585 | 62.3 | −12.9 |
| Registered electors | | 73,123 | | +1.5 |
| Conservative hold | | Swing | −0.1 | |

=== Elections in the 1990s ===
General election 1997: Macclesfield
| Party | Candidate | Votes | % | ±% |
|---|---|---|---|---|
| Conservative | Nicholas Winterton | 26,888 | 49.6 | −6.4 |
| Labour | Janet Jackson | 18,234 | 33.6 | +10.8 |
| Liberal Democrats | Michael Flynn | 9,075 | 16.7 | −4.0 |
| Majority | | 8,654 | 16.0 | −17.2 |
| Turnout | | 54,197 | 75.2 | –6.3 |
| Registered electors | | 72,049 | | +1.7 |
| Conservative hold | | Swing | −8.6 | |

1992 notional result
| Party | Vote | % |
|---|---|---|
| Conservative | 32,332 | 56.0 |
| Labour | 13,202 | 22.9 |
| Liberal Democrats | 11,958 | 20.7 |
| Others | 246 | 0.4 |
| Turnout | 57,738 | 81.5 |
| Electorate | 57,738 | |

General election 1992: Macclesfield
| Party | Candidate | Votes | % | ±% |
|---|---|---|---|---|
| Conservative | Nicholas Winterton | 36,447 | 57.9 | +1.5 |
| Labour | Martina Longworth | 13,680 | 21.7 | +2.1 |
| Liberal Democrats | Paul Beatty | 12,600 | 20.0 | −4.0 |
| Natural Law | Cheryl Penn | 268 | 0.4 | N/A |
| Majority | | 22,767 | 36.1 | +3.7 |
| Turnout | | 62,995 | 82.3 | +4.9 |
| Registered electors | | 76,548 | | +0.6 |
| Conservative hold | | Swing | −0.3 | |

=== Elections in the 1980s ===
General election 1987: Macclesfield
| Party | Candidate | Votes | % | ±% |
|---|---|---|---|---|
| Conservative | Nicholas Winterton | 33,208 | 56.4 | −3.0 |
| Liberal | Andrew Haldane | 14,116 | 24.0 | +2.3 |
| Labour | Caroline Pinder | 11,563 | 19.6 | +1.5 |
| Majority | | 19,092 | 32.4 | −5.3 |
| Turnout | | 58,887 | 77.4 | +2.4 |
| Registered electors | | 76,093 | | +4.0 |
| Conservative hold | | Swing | −2.7 | |

General election 1983: Macclesfield
| Party | Candidate | Votes | % | ±% |
|---|---|---|---|---|
| Conservative | Nicholas Winterton | 32,538 | 59.4 | –0.7 |
| Liberal | Ruth Coleman | 11,859 | 21.6 | +4.6 |
| Labour | Peter Kelly | 9,923 | 18.1 | –4.9 |
| Independent | M. Reeman | 488 | 0.9 | N/a |
| Majority | | 20,679 | 37.7 | +0.7 |
| Turnout | | 54,808 | 75.0 | |
| Registered electors | | 73,082 | | |
| Conservative hold | | Swing | –2.6 | |

1979 notional result
| Party | Vote | % |
|---|---|---|
| Conservative | 33,830 | 60.0 |
| Labour | 12,951 | 23.0 |
| Liberal | 9,584 | 17.0 |
| Turnout | 56,365 | |
| Electorate | | |

=== Elections in the 1970s ===
General election 1979: Macclesfield
| Party | Candidate | Votes | % | ±% |
|---|---|---|---|---|
| Conservative | Nicholas Winterton | 40,116 | 58.5 | +8.2 |
| Labour | R.A. Foster | 16,779 | 24.5 | –5.0 |
| Liberal | Anthony Berry | 11,726 | 17.1 | –3.2 |
| Majority | | 23,337 | 34.0 | +13.2 |
| Turnout | | 68,621 | 78.10 | –0.6 |
| Registered electors | | 87,864 | | +8.8 |
| Conservative hold | | Swing | +6.6 | |

General election October 1974: Macclesfield
| Party | Candidate | Votes | % | ±% |
|---|---|---|---|---|
| Conservative | Nicholas Winterton | 31,685 | 50.3 | +1.5 |
| Labour | Kenneth Little | 18,592 | 29.5 | +2.1 |
| Liberal | Anthony Berry | 12,764 | 20.3 | –3.6 |
| Majority | | 13,093 | 20.8 | –0.6 |
| Turnout | | 63,041 | 78.7 | –5.5 |
| Registered electors | | 80,150 | | +0.8 |
| Conservative hold | | Swing | | |

General election February 1974: Macclesfield
| Party | Candidate | Votes | % | ±% |
|---|---|---|---|---|
| Conservative | Nicholas Winterton | 32,638 | 48.8 | –3.7 |
| Labour | Harry Silverman | 18,352 | 27.4 | –5.0 |
| Liberal | Anthony Berry | 15,926 | 23.8 | +8.7 |
| Majority | | 14,286 | 21.3 | +1.3 |
| Turnout | | 66,916 | 84.2 | +8.2 |
| Registered electors | | 79,481 | | +3.5 |
| Conservative hold | | Swing | +0.6 | |

1970 notional result
| Party | Vote | % |
|---|---|---|
| Conservative | 30,600 | 52.5 |
| Labour | 18,900 | 32.4 |
| Liberal | 8,800 | 15.1 |
| Turnout | 58,300 | 76.0 |
| Electorate | 76,733 | |

== Election results 1950–1974 ==
=== Elections in the 1970s ===
1971 Macclesfield by-election
| Party | Candidate | Votes | % | ±% |
|---|---|---|---|---|
| Conservative | Nicholas Winterton | 24,933 | 44.65 | −7.44 |
| Labour | Diana Jeuda | 23,854 | 42.71 | +9.38 |
| Liberal | R. M. Hammond | 5,991 | 10.73 | −3.85 |
| Anti-Common Market Party | Reginald Simmerson | 976 | 1.75 | N/A |
| English National Resurgence | Robert Goodall | 92 | 0.16 | N/A |
| Majority | | 1,079 | 1.94 | −16.82 |
| Turnout | | 55,846 | | |
| Registered electors | | | | |
| Conservative hold | | Swing | | |

General election 1970: Macclesfield
| Party | Candidate | Votes | % | ±% |
|---|---|---|---|---|
| Conservative | Arthur Vere Harvey | 29,023 | 52.09 | |
| Labour | Basil S. Jeuda | 18,571 | 33.33 | |
| Liberal | Robert M. Hammond | 8,124 | 14.58 | |
| Majority | | 10,452 | 18.76 | |
| Turnout | | 55,718 | 76.36 | |
| Registered electors | | | | |
| Conservative hold | | Swing | | |

=== Elections in the 1960s ===
General election 1966: Macclesfield
| Party | Candidate | Votes | % | ±% |
|---|---|---|---|---|
| Conservative | Arthur Vere Harvey | 24,736 | 46.84 | |
| Labour | Alec George Read | 20,533 | 38.88 | |
| Liberal | Donald Fletcher Burden | 7,545 | 14.29 | |
| Majority | | 4,203 | 7.96 | |
| Turnout | | 52,814 | 81.71 | |
| Registered electors | | | | |
| Conservative hold | | Swing | | |

General election 1964: Macclesfield
| Party | Candidate | Votes | % | ±% |
|---|---|---|---|---|
| Conservative | Arthur Vere Harvey | 24,824 | 47.50 | |
| Labour | Denis W. Coe | 18,464 | 35.33 | |
| Liberal | Gordon Hewlett-Johnson | 8,975 | 17.17 | N/A |
| Majority | | 6,360 | 12.17 | |
| Turnout | | 52,263 | 84.06 | |
| Registered electors | | | | |
| Conservative hold | | Swing | | |

=== Elections in the 1950s ===
General election 1959: Macclesfield
| Party | Candidate | Votes | % | ±% |
|---|---|---|---|---|
| Conservative | Arthur Vere Harvey | 28,978 | 59.59 | |
| Labour | John F. Bex | 19,652 | 40.41 | |
| Majority | | 9,326 | 19.18 | |
| Turnout | | 48,630 | 82.57 | |
| Registered electors | | | | |
| Conservative hold | | Swing | | |

General election 1955: Macclesfield
| Party | Candidate | Votes | % | ±% |
|---|---|---|---|---|
| Conservative | Arthur Vere Harvey | 27,551 | 60.01 | |
| Labour | Kenneth Lomas | 18,362 | 39.99 | |
| Majority | | 9,189 | 20.02 | |
| Turnout | | 45,913 | 80.56 | |
| Registered electors | | | | |
| Conservative hold | | Swing | | |

General election 1951: Macclesfield
| Party | Candidate | Votes | % | ±% |
|---|---|---|---|---|
| Conservative | Arthur Vere Harvey | 29,434 | 59.03 | |
| Labour | Agnes E. Taylor | 20,428 | 40.97 | |
| Majority | | 9,006 | 18.06 | |
| Turnout | | 49,862 | 87.27 | |
| Registered electors | | | | |
| Conservative hold | | Swing | | |

General election 1950: Macclesfield
| Party | Candidate | Votes | % |
|---|---|---|---|
| Conservative | Arthur Vere Harvey | 25,781 | 50.93 |
| Labour | Fred Blackburn | 19,219 | 37.97 |
| Liberal | Clarence Doncaster | 5,621 | 11.10 |
| Majority | | 6,562 | 12.96 |
| Turnout | | 50,621 | 89.42 |
| Registered electors | | | |
| Conservative win (new boundaries) | | | |

== Election results 1918–1950 ==
=== Election in the 1940s ===
General election 1945: Macclesfield
| Party | Candidate | Votes | % | ±% |
|---|---|---|---|---|
| Conservative | Arthur Vere Harvey | 23,495 | 45.50 | |
| Labour | Harold Fraser Urquhart | 20,442 | 39.59 | |
| Liberal | Edward Anthony Brooke Fletcher | 7,702 | 14.92 | |
| Majority | | 3,053 | 5.91 | |
| Turnout | | 51,639 | 80.08 | |
| Registered electors | | | | |
| Conservative hold | | Swing | | |

=== Elections in the 1930s ===
General Election 1939–40: Another General Election was required to take place before the end of 1940. The political parties had been making preparations for an election to take place from 1939 and by the end of this year, the following candidates had been selected;

- Conservative: W. Garfield Weston
- Labour: C. T. Douthwaite
- Liberal: Edward Anthony Brooke Fletcher

1939 Macclesfield by-election
| Party | Candidate | Votes | % | ±% |
|---|---|---|---|---|
| Conservative | W. Garfield Weston | Unopposed | | |
| Registered electors | | | | |
| Conservative hold | | | | |

General election 1935: Macclesfield
| Party | Candidate | Votes | % | ±% |
|---|---|---|---|---|
| Conservative | John Remer | 24,249 | 52.53 | −17.44 |
| Labour | George Darling | 14,761 | 31.98 | +0.95 |
| Liberal | John Lawrence Poole | 7,151 | 15.49 | N/A |
| Majority | | 9,488 | 20.55 | |
| Turnout | | 46,161 | 78.87 | |
| Registered electors | | | | |
| Conservative hold | | Swing | | |

General election 1931: Macclesfield
| Party | Candidate | Votes | % | ±% |
|---|---|---|---|---|
| Conservative | John Remer | 30,796 | 68.97 | +28.07 |
| Labour | D. Scott Morton | 13,854 | 31.03 | +0.83 |
| Majority | | 16,942 | 37.94 | |
| Turnout | | 44,650 | 81.25 | |
| Registered electors | | | | |
| Conservative hold | | Swing | +13.62 | |

=== Elections in the 1920s ===
General election 1929: Macclesfield
| Party | Candidate | Votes | % | ±% |
|---|---|---|---|---|
| Unionist | John Remer | 19,329 | 41.9 | −9.0 |
| Labour | John Williams | 13,911 | 30.2 | +0.1 |
| Liberal | Selwyn Lloyd | 12,891 | 27.9 | +8.9 |
| Majority | | 5,418 | 11.7 | −9.1 |
| Turnout | | 46,131 | 87.0 | +2.4 |
| Registered electors | | 53,053 | | |
| Unionist hold | | Swing | −4.6 | |

General election 1924: Macclesfield
| Party | Candidate | Votes | % | ±% |
|---|---|---|---|---|
| Unionist | John Remer | 17,171 | 50.9 | +5.8 |
| Labour | John Williams | 10,187 | 30.1 | +9.6 |
| Liberal | Harry Krauss Nield | 6,434 | 19.0 | −15.4 |
| Majority | | 6,984 | 20.8 | +10.1 |
| Turnout | | 33,792 | 84.6 | +0.7 |
| Registered electors | | 39,962 | | |
| Unionist hold | | Swing | −1.9 | |

General election 1923: Macclesfield
| Party | Candidate | Votes | % | ±% |
|---|---|---|---|---|
| Unionist | John Remer | 14,744 | 45.1 | −3.0 |
| Liberal | William Tudor Davies | 11,259 | 34.4 | +2.5 |
| Labour | Andrew Joseph Penston | 6,713 | 20.5 | +0.5 |
| Majority | | 3,485 | 10.7 | −5.5 |
| Turnout | | 32,716 | 83.9 | −2.1 |
| Registered electors | | 38,982 | | |
| Unionist hold | | Swing | −2.8 | |

General election 1922: Macclesfield
| Party | Candidate | Votes | % | ±% |
|---|---|---|---|---|
| Unionist | John Remer | 15,825 | 48.1 | −10.1 |
| Liberal | Thomas Artemus Jones | 10,477 | 31.9 | N/A |
| Labour | Andrew Joseph Penston | 6,584 | 20.0 | −21.8 |
| Majority | | 5,348 | 16.2 | −0.2 |
| Turnout | | 32,886 | 86.0 | +18.9 |
| Registered electors | | 38,245 | | |
| Unionist hold | | Swing | +5.9 | |

=== Elections in the 1910s ===
General election 1918: Macclesfield
| Party | | Candidate | Votes | % |
|---|---|---|---|---|
| C | Unionist | John Remer | 14,277 | 58.2 |
| | Labour | William Pimblott | 10,253 | 41.8 |
| Majority | | | 4,024 | 16.4 |
| Turnout | | | 24,530 | 67.1 |
| Registered electors | | | 36,577 | |
| | Unionist win (new boundaries) | | | |
C indicates candidate endorsed by the coalition government.

== Election results 1885–1918 ==
=== Elections in the 1910s ===
General Election 1914–15:

Another General Election was required to take place before the end of 1915. The political parties had been making preparations for an election to take place and by July 1914, the following candidates had been selected;

- Liberal: | William B Brocklehurst
- Unionist:

General election December 1910: Macclesfield
| Party | Candidate | Votes | % | ±% |
|---|---|---|---|---|
| Liberal | William B Brocklehurst | 4,410 | 51.6 | +0.8 |
| Conservative | Ben Dent | 4,142 | 48.4 | −0.8 |
| Majority | | 268 | 3.2 | +1.6 |
| Turnout | | 8,552 | 91.9 | −3.9 |
| Registered electors | | 9,306 | | |
| Liberal hold | | Swing | +0.8 | |

General election January 1910: Macclesfield
| Party | Candidate | Votes | % | ±% |
|---|---|---|---|---|
| Liberal | William B Brocklehurst | 4,534 | 50.8 | −2.3 |
| Conservative | William Bromley-Davenport | 4,384 | 49.2 | +2.3 |
| Majority | | 150 | 1.6 | −4.6 |
| Turnout | | 8,918 | 95.8 | +3.1 |
| Registered electors | | 9,306 | | |
| Liberal hold | | Swing | −2.3 | |

=== Elections in the 1900s ===
General election 1906: Macclesfield
| Party | Candidate | Votes | % | ±% |
|---|---|---|---|---|
| Liberal | William B Brocklehurst | 4,251 | 53.1 | N/A |
| Conservative | William Bromley-Davenport | 3,757 | 46.9 | N/A |
| Majority | | 494 | 6.2 | N/A |
| Turnout | | 8,008 | 92.7 | N/A |
| Registered electors | | 8,636 | | |
| Liberal gain from Conservative | | Swing | N/A | |

General election 1900: Macclesfield
| Party | Candidate | Votes | % | ±% |
|---|---|---|---|---|
| Conservative | William Bromley-Davenport | Unopposed | | |
| Conservative hold | | | | |

=== Elections in the 1890s ===
General election 1895: Macclesfield
| Party | Candidate | Votes | % | ±% |
|---|---|---|---|---|
| Conservative | William Bromley-Davenport | Unopposed | | |
| Conservative hold | | | | |

General election 1892: Macclesfield
| Party | Candidate | Votes | % | ±% |
|---|---|---|---|---|
| Conservative | William Bromley-Davenport | 4,322 | 56.0 | +1.6 |
| Liberal | James Carlile McCoan | 3,396 | 44.0 | −1.6 |
| Majority | | 926 | 12.0 | +3.2 |
| Turnout | | 7,718 | 86.1 | +2.4 |
| Registered electors | | 8,959 | | |
| Conservative hold | | Swing | +1.6 | |

=== Elections in the 1880s ===
General election 1886: Macclesfield
| Party | Candidate | Votes | % | ±% |
|---|---|---|---|---|
| Conservative | William Bromley-Davenport | 3,283 | 54.4 | +8.2 |
| Liberal | William Brocklehurst | 2,756 | 45.6 | −8.2 |
| Majority | | 527 | 8.8 | N/A |
| Turnout | | 6,039 | 83.7 | −1.7 |
| Registered electors | | 7,211 | | |
| Conservative gain from | | Swing | +8.2 | |

General election 1885: Macclesfield
| Party | Candidate | Votes | % |
|---|---|---|---|
| Liberal | William Brocklehurst | 3,311 | 53.8 |
| Conservative | William Cunliffe Brooks | 2,846 | 46.2 |
| Majority | | 465 | 7.6 |
| Turnout | | 6,157 | 85.4 |
| Registered electors | | 7,211 | |
| Liberal win (new seat) | | | |

== Election results 1832–1885 ==
=== Elections in the 1880s ===
General election 1880: Macclesfield (2 seats)
| Party | Candidate | Votes | % | ±% |
|---|---|---|---|---|
| Liberal | William Brocklehurst | 2,946 | 27.9 | −1.0 |
| Liberal | David Chadwick | 2,744 | 26.0 | +0.5 |
| Conservative | William Eaton | 2,678 | 25.4 | +0.3 |
| Conservative | James Charles Whitehorne | 2,188 | 20.7 | +0.2 |
| Majority | | 66 | 0.6 | +0.2 |
| Turnout | | 5,278 (est) | 99.5 (est) | +11.4 |
| Registered electors | | 5,304 | | |
| Void election result | | Swing | −0.7 | |
| Void election result | | Swing | +0.2 | |

The writ was suspended after an investigation found extensive bribery and the 1880 election was void. Macclesfield was incorporated into Cheshire East from 25 June 1885, before being re-established for the 1885 election.

=== Elections in the 1870s ===
General election 1874: Macclesfield
| Party | Candidate | Votes | % | ±% |
|---|---|---|---|---|
| Liberal | William Brocklehurst | 3,173 | 28.9 | −7.9 |
| Liberal | David Chadwick | 2,792 | 25.5 | −7.3 |
| Conservative | William Eaton | 2,750 | 25.1 | +9.9 |
| Conservative | James Croston | 2,250 | 20.5 | +5.3 |
| Majority | | 42 | 0.4 | −2.0 |
| Turnout | | 5,483 (est) | 88.1 (est) | +7.4 |
| Registered electors | | 6,224 | | |
| Liberal hold | | Swing | −8.9 | |
| Liberal hold | | Swing | −6.3 | |

=== Elections in the 1860s ===
General election 1868: Macclesfield
| Party | Candidate | Votes | % | ±% |
|---|---|---|---|---|
| Liberal | William Brocklehurst | 2,812 | 36.8 | +2.3 |
| Liberal | David Chadwick | 2,509 | 32.8 | +1.9 |
| Conservative | William Eaton | 2,321 | 30.4 | −4.2 |
| Majority | | 188 | 2.4 | N/A |
| Turnout | | 3,821 (est) | 80.7 (est) | −16.4 |
| Registered electors | | 4,737 | | |
| Liberal hold | | Swing | +2.2 | |
| Liberal gain from Conservative | | Swing | +2.0 | |

General election 1865: Macclesfield
| Party | Candidate | Votes | % | ±% |
|---|---|---|---|---|
| Conservative | Edward Egerton | 471 | 34.6 | N/A |
| Liberal | John Brocklehurst | 469 | 34.5 | N/A |
| Liberal | David Chadwick | 421 | 30.9 | N/A |
| Majority | | 2 | 0.1 | N/A |
| Turnout | | 916 (est) | 97.1 (est) | N/A |
| Registered electors | | 943 | | |
| Conservative hold | | | | |
| Liberal hold | | | | |

=== Elections in the 1850s ===
General election 1859: Macclesfield
| Party | Candidate | Votes | % | ±% |
|---|---|---|---|---|
| Conservative | Edward Egerton | Unopposed | | |
| Liberal | John Brocklehurst | Unopposed | | |
| Registered electors | | 1,073 | | |
| Conservative hold | | | | |
| Liberal hold | | | | |

General election 1857: Macclesfield
| Party | Candidate | Votes | % | ±% |
|---|---|---|---|---|
| Whig | John Brocklehurst | 637 | 53.0 | +14.4 |
| Conservative | Edward Egerton | 556 | 46.3 | +13.7 |
| Whig | Thomas Huggins | 9 | 0.7 | N/A |
| Turnout | | 601 (est) | 54.3 (est) | −22.5 |
| Registered electors | | 1,106 | | |
| Majority | | 81 | 6.7 | +0.7 |
| Whig hold | | Swing | +0.4 | |
| Majority | | 547 | 45.6 | +41.8 |
| Conservative hold | | Swing | −0.4 | |

- Huggins resigned towards the close of the poll.

General election 1852: Macclesfield
| Party | Candidate | Votes | % | ±% |
|---|---|---|---|---|
| Whig | John Brocklehurst | 628 | 38.6 | −0.6 |
| Conservative | Edward Egerton | 530 | 32.6 | +4.6 |
| Radical | John Williams | 468 | 28.8 | −4.0 |
| Turnout | | 813 (est) | 76.8 (est) | −3.9 |
| Registered electors | | 1,058 | | |
| Majority | | 98 | 6.0 | −0.4 |
| Whig hold | | Swing | –1.5 | |
| Majority | | 62 | 3.8 | N/A |
| Conservative gain from Radical | | Swing | +3.3 | |

=== Elections in the 1840s ===
General election 1847: Macclesfield
| Party | Candidate | Votes | % | ±% |
|---|---|---|---|---|
| Whig | John Brocklehurst | 598 | 39.2 | −2.8 |
| Radical | John Williams | 500 | 32.8 | +7.1 |
| Conservative | Thomas Grimsditch | 428 | 28.0 | −4.3 |
| Turnout | | 763 (est) | 80.7 (est) | +9.6 |
| Registered electors | | 946 | | |
| Majority | | 98 | 6.4 | −3.3 |
| Whig hold | | Swing | −0.3 | |
| Majority | | 72 | 4.8 | N/A |
| Radical gain from Conservative | | Swing | +4.6 | |

General election 1841: Macclesfield
| Party | Candidate | Votes | % | ±% |
|---|---|---|---|---|
| Whig | John Brocklehurst | 534 | 42.0 | +0.3 |
| Conservative | Thomas Grimsditch | 410 | 32.3 | −3.7 |
| Whig | Samuel Stocks | 327 | 25.7 | +3.4 |
| Turnout | | 636 (est) | 71.1 (est) | c. −7.3 |
| Registered electors | | 894 | | |
| Majority | | 124 | 9.7 | +4.0 |
| Whig hold | | Swing | +1.1 | |
| Majority | | 83 | 6.6 | −7.1 |
| Conservative hold | | Swing | −3.7 | |

=== Elections in the 1830s ===
General election 1837: Macclesfield
| Party | Candidate | Votes | % | ±% |
|---|---|---|---|---|
| Whig | John Brocklehurst | 546 | 41.7 | +24.5 |
| Conservative | Thomas Grimsditch | 471 | 36.0 | −29.5 |
| Whig | Robert Hyde Greg | 292 | 22.3 | +5.1 |
| Turnout | | 764 | 78.4 | −0.5 |
| Registered electors | | 975 | | |
| Majority | | 75 | 5.7 | −1.0 |
| Whig hold | | Swing | +19.6 | |
| Majority | | 179 | 13.7 | +10.5 |
| Conservative hold | | Swing | −29.6 | |

General election 1835: Macclesfield
| Party | Candidate | Votes | % | ±% |
|---|---|---|---|---|
| Conservative | John Ryle (politician) | 464 | 37.7 | −4.7 |
| Whig | John Brocklehurst | 424 | 34.5 | −4.9 |
| Conservative | Thomas Grimsditch | 342 | 27.8 | +9.6 |
| Turnout | | 706 | 78.9 | −3.0 |
| Registered electors | | 895 | | |
| Majority | | 40 | 3.2 | +0.2 |
| Conservative hold | | Swing | −1.1 | |
| Majority | | 82 | 6.7 | −14.5 |
| Whig hold | | Swing | −4.9 | |

General election 1832: Macclesfield
| Party | Candidate | Votes | % |
|---|---|---|---|
| Tory | John Ryle (politician) | 433 | 42.4 |
| Whig | John Brocklehurst | 402 | 39.4 |
| Tory | Thomas Grimsditch | 186 | 18.2 |
| Turnout | | 588 | 81.9 |
| Registered electors | | 718 | |
| Majority | | 31 | 3.0 |
| Tory win (new seat) | | | |
| Majority | | 216 | 21.2 |
| Whig win (new seat) | | | |

== See also ==
- List of parliamentary constituencies in Cheshire
- History of parliamentary constituencies and boundaries in Cheshire
