= Thomas Artemus Jones =

Welsh barrister (1871–1943)

Jones in 1919 upon becoming a KC

His Honour Sir Thomas Artemus Jones KC LLD, (1871 – 15 October 1943), was a Welsh barrister, judge, journalist, nationalist and Liberal Party politician who campaigned for the Welsh language.

== Life ==
Jones was born in Denbigh, the youngest of six sons of stonemason Thomas Jones. In 1927 he married Mildred Mary David, who also practised as a barrister.

After leaving school at sixteen, Jones worked as a journalist, first in North Wales, before moving to Manchester, then London. Here he was on the parliamentary staff of The Daily Telegraph and The Daily News.

Jones died in Bangor on 15 October 1943, aged 72.

=== Legal career ===
Jones was called to the Bar at the Middle Temple in 1901, after which he practised as a barrister on the Welsh Circuit, becoming Queen's Counsel in 1919. He became a Bencher of the Middle Temple in 1926, was knighted in 1931 and was made an Honorary Doctor of Laws (LLD) in 1938. Jones served as County Court Judge for the District of North Wales from 1930 until he retired in 1942.

In 1908 he brought a successful libel action against the Sunday Chronicle that received much publicity at the time. He was awarded £1,750 (equivalent to £182,016 in 2025) after the newspaper published a satirical sketch about one Artemus Jones, a fictional Peckham church warden who had gone to France with a woman 'who was not his wife'. It was after this case that publishers began the practice of adding a statement that 'all characters in this story are purely fictitious'.

=== Political career ===
Jones was a Liberal and first active in the Cymru Fydd movement, along with David Lloyd George. He was selected as Liberal candidate for Merthyr against James Keir Hardie in 1913, for a General Election expected to take place in 1914/15, but postponed due to the war. After the Liberal Party split between supporters of the Coalition government led by Lloyd George and those of the opposition Liberals led by H.H. Asquith, Jones sided against Lloyd George. After 1918 he sought the Liberal nomination in the Gower constituency but was not selected due to his hostility to the Coalition Government. In 1922, with Liberals opposed to Lloyd George struggling to find Welsh constituencies willing to adopt them, he looked elsewhere and was adopted in the unpromising seat of Macclesfield, where no Liberal had stood at the previous election. Despite this, at the general election he came second, comfortably pushing the Labour candidate into third place. Following Liberal reunion in 1923, he was adopted to contest the Welsh marginal Labour seat of Swansea East, which the Liberals had lost in 1922. However, he failed to take the seat at the 1923 General Election. In 1924 he was chosen to be the Liberal candidate with the task of retaining the marginal seat of Keighley. However, a Unionist candidate intervened in the contest and Jones was edged into third place. He did not stand for parliament again.

Jones was a campaigner for the Welsh language. He supported the repeal of section 17 of the 1536 Act of Union that gave no legal status to the Welsh language, and began his tenure as County Court Judge for North Wales in 1930 by proposing to accept Welsh in court and disregard section 17 on the basis it was overridden by common law. He highlighted a 1933 case where the chairman, jurors, advocates, the justices, the prisoner and all the witnesses spoke Welsh, yet the trial had to be conducted in English because the court shorthand writer was an Englishman who spoke no Welsh. Following a UK wide petition, the section was finally repealed by the Welsh Courts Act of 1942. He was a key supporter of the Liberal William John Gruffydd in the 1943 University of Wales by-election. He was one of the first people to call for an appointment of a Secretary of State for Wales.

In 1944 his Without my Wig, a collection of essays on historical subjects, was published posthumously. It included an account of the trial of Sir Roger Casement, at which he was junior defence counsel.

==== Electoral record ====
Jones stood for Parliament on three occasions:

General Election 1922: Macclesfield
Party	Candidate	Votes	%	±%
Unionist	John Rumney Remer	15,825	48.1	−10.1
Liberal	Thomas Artemus Jones	10,477	31.9	New
Labour	Andrew Joseph Penston	6,584	20.0	−21.8
Majority		5,348	16.2	−0.2
Turnout		32,886	86.0	+18.9
Unionist hold		Swing	+5.9	

General Election 1923: Swansea East
Party	Candidate	Votes	%	±%
Labour	David Williams	12,735	57.4	+6.5
Liberal	Thomas Artemus Jones	9,463	42.6	−6.5
Majority		3,272	14.8	+13.0
Turnout		22,198	81.1	−0.6
Labour hold		Swing	+6.5	

General Election 1924: Keighley
Party	Candidate	Votes	%	±%
Labour	Hastings Bertrand Lees-Smith	14,105	45.0	−4.1
Unionist	T P Perks	8,922	28.4	New
Liberal	Thomas Artemus Jones	8,339	26.6	−24.3
Majority		5,183	16.6	N/A
Turnout		31,366	82.8	+5.4
Labour gain from Liberal		Swing	+10.1	
