= Thomas Grimsditch =

Thomas Grimsditch (1786–1864) was a Conservative Party politician in England.

He was elected at the 1837 general election as one of the two Members of Parliament (MPs) for the borough of Macclesfield, having contested the seat unsuccessfully in 1832 and 1835. He was re-elected in 1841, but was defeated at the 1847 general election and did not stand for Parliament again.

Parliament of the United Kingdom
Preceded by John Ryle; John Brocklehurst	Member of Parliament for Macclesfield; 1837 – 1847; With: John Brocklehurst	Succeeded by John Williams; John Brocklehurst
