= Harrow Road (ward) =

Electoral ward in London, England

- Electoral ward for the Westminster City Council
- Harrow Road ward boundaries since 2022
- Borough: Westminster
- County: Greater London
- Population: 11,381 (2021) (Note: 2021 Census data reported for 2022 ward boundaries)
- Electorate: 7,628 (2022)
- Area: 0.4994 square kilometres (0.1928 sq mi)

Current electoral ward
- Created: 1965
- GSS code: E05013795 (2022–present)

Harrow Road is an electoral ward of the City of Westminster. The ward has existed since the creation of the borough on 1 April 1965 and was first used in the 1964 elections. It returns councillors to Westminster City Council.

== Westminster council elections since 2022 ==
There was a revision of ward boundaries in Westminster in 2022.

2026 election

The election took place on 7 May 2026

Harrow Road (3)
Party	Candidate	Votes	%	±%
Labour	Concia Albert *	1,038	40.8	−31.9
Labour	Regan Hook *	944	37.1	−34.1
Labour	Rhys Thomas	909	35.7	−33.2
Green	Charlie Button	893	35.1	N/A
Green	Ilemi Arrindell	884	34.7	N/A
Green	Faaiz Hasan	862	33.9	N/A
Conservative	Alexander Hawthorn	310	12.2	−6.0
Conservative	Samuel Parr	272	10.7	−6.6
Conservative	Iheoma Oteh	267	10.5	−5.2
Reform	Lars Agren	223	8.8	N/A
Reform	Alex Hayter	212	8.3	N/A
Reform	Lazar Petrovic	200	7.9	N/A
Liberal Democrats	David Ewen	129	5.1	−5.4
Liberal Democrats	Diane Yeo	125	4.9	−3.6
Workers Party	Momosi Umolu	54	2.1	N/A
Majority		16	0.6	−50.1
Turnout		2,544	33.9	+6.2
Labour hold				
Labour hold				
Labour hold				

=== 2024 by-election ===
The by-election took place on 19 September 2024, following the resignation of Tim Roca. It took place on the same day as the by-election in West End ward.

2024 Harrow Road by-election
Party	Candidate	Votes	%	±%
Labour	Regan Hook	512		
Green	Faaiz Hasan	244		
Workers Party	Hoz Shafiei	166		
Conservative	Jonathan Goff	162		
Liberal Democrats	Helen Toeman	63		
Independent	Abby-Jan Dharamsey	11		
Turnout				
Labour hold		Swing		

=== 2022 election ===
The election took place on 5 May 2022.

2022 Westminster City Council election: Harrow Road
Party	Candidate	Votes	%	±%
Labour	Ruth Bush	1,524	72.7	
Labour	Concia Albert	1,492	71.2	
Labour	Tim Roca	1,444	68.9	
Conservative	Helen Hope Lambert	381	18.2	
Conservative	Tom Haynes	362	17.3	
Conservative	Sam Parr	328	15.7	
Liberal Democrats	Will Baynes	219	10.5	
Liberal Democrats	Sharan Tabari	179	8.5	
Turnout		2,095	27.65	
Labour hold		Swing		
Labour hold		Swing		
Labour hold		Swing		

== 2002–2022 Westminster council elections ==
Harrow Road ward boundaries from 2002 to 2022

There was a revision of ward boundaries in Wetminster in 2002.

=== 2018 election ===
The election took place on 3 May 2018.

2018 Westminster City Council election: Harrow Road
Party	Candidate	Votes	%	±%
Labour	Ruth Bush	2,023	74.9	+4.6
Labour	Guthrie McKie	1,804	66.8	+8.1
Labour	Tim Roca	1,660	61.5	+5.9
Conservative	Grazyna Green	461	17.1	−4.4
Conservative	Aled Jones	414	15.3	−0.7
Conservative	Thomas Weekenborg	386	14.3	+0.6
Green	Roc Sandford	347	12.9	−5.3
Liberal Democrats	Michael Griffin	182	6.7	N/A
Liberal Democrats	Kevin Greenan	179	6.6	N/A
Liberal Democrats	Dorothy Newman	175	6.5	N/A
Majority		1199	44.4	
Turnout		7631	34.4	+1.5
Labour hold		Swing		
Labour hold		Swing		
Labour hold		Swing		

=== 2015 by-election ===
The by-election took place on 23 July 2015.

Harrow Road by-election, 23 July 2015
Party	Candidate	Votes	%	±%
Labour	Tim Roca	1,139	75.4	+18.9
Conservative	Wilford Augustus	334	22.1	+6.4
UKIP	Jill Sarah De Quincey	38	2.5	−8.6
Majority		805	53.3	+13.5
Turnout		1,511	19.4	−13.5
Labour hold		Swing		

The by-election was called following the resignation of Cllr. Nilavra Mukerji.

=== 2014 election ===
The election took place on 22 May 2014.

2014 Westminster City Council election: Harrow Road
Party	Candidate	Votes	%	±%
Labour	Ruth Bush	1,788	70.3	
Labour	Guthrie McKie	1,493	58.7	
Labour	Nilavra Mukerji	1,415	55.6	
Conservative	Grazyna Green	546	21.5	
Green	Roc Sandford	464	18.2	
Conservative	Aline Nassif	406	16.0	
Conservative	Hartej Singh	349	13.7	
UKIP	Russ Kitching	308	12.1	
Majority		869	34.1	
Turnout		6769	32.9	−25.1
Labour hold		Swing		
Labour hold		Swing		
Labour hold		Swing		

=== 2010 election ===
The election on 6 May 2010 took place on the same day as the United Kingdom general election.

=== 2006 election ===
The election took place on 4 May 2006.

2006 Westminster City Council election: Harrow Road (3)
Party	Candidate	Votes	%	±%
Labour	Ruth Bush	1,036	52.6	
Labour	Guthrie McKie	899		
Labour	Sharan Tabari	877		
Conservative	Mehfuz Ahmed	523	26.5	
Conservative	Peter Prendergast	520		
Conservative	Christopher Lees	520		
Liberal Democrats	Shamsu Miah	411	20.9	
Liberal Democrats	Peter Dunphy	369		
Liberal Democrats	Winston Fletcher	325		
Turnout			26.0	
Labour hold		Swing		
Labour hold		Swing		
Labour hold		Swing		

=== 2005 by-election ===
The by-election took place on 21 July 2006.

=== 2002 election ===
The election took place on 2 May 2002.

Harrow Road (3)
Party	Candidate	Votes	%	±%
Labour	Guthrie McKie* (Note: McKie and Ohene-Djan were both elected in a by-election triggered by the resignations of Cllr Jillian Selbourne and Cllr Gary Martin in 2000)	1,029	52.19	▼13.60
Labour	Sharan Tabari	952		
Labour	Josephine Ohene-Djan*	942		
Conservative	Andrew Reid	362	17.44	▼5.41
Conservative	Jeremy Fox	328		
Green	Paul Miller	289	15.48	New
Conservative	Edward Vaizey	287		
Liberal Democrats	Melissa Foux	278	14.89	▲3.54
Registered electors		6,568		▼834
Turnout		1,642	25.00	▼0.84
Rejected ballots		5	0.30	▼1.01
Labour win (new boundaries)				
Labour win (new boundaries)				
Labour win (new boundaries)				

== 1978–2002 Westminster council elections ==
There was a revision of ward boundaries in Westminster in 1978.

=== 2000 by-election ===
The by-election took place on 4 May 2000.

=== 1998 election ===
The election took place on 7 May 1998.

Harrow Road (3)
Party	Candidate	Votes	%	±%
Labour	Alan Lazarus*	1,189	65.79	▲1.36
Labour	Jillian Selbourne*	1,162		
Labour	Gary Martin	1,115		
Conservative	Patrick O'Sullivan	435	22.85	▼3.60
Conservative	Daniel Astaire	411		
Conservative	Timothy Slotover	358		
Liberal Democrats	Donald McLachlan	225	11.35	▲2.24
Liberal Democrats	John Brown	193		
Liberal Democrats	Kathleen Hobbins	180		
Registered electors		7,402		▲1,027
Turnout		1,913	25.84	▼16.25
Rejected ballots		25	1.31	▲1.12
Labour hold				
Labour hold				
Labour hold				

=== 1994 election ===
The election took place on 5 May 1994.

1994 Westminster City Council election: Harrow Road
Party	Candidate	Votes	%	±%
Labour	Jacqueline Rosenberg	1,577	64.43	▲4.42
Labour	Alan Lazarus	1,511		
Labour	Jillian Selbourne	1,471		
Conservative	Simon Lapthorne	638	26.45	▼5.47
Conservative	Douglas Jacobs	622		
Conservative	Anthony Frieze	612		
Liberal Democrats	John Laurie	249	9.11	New
Liberal Democrats	Donald McLachlan	211		
Liberal Democrats	Nigel Mukherjee	186		
Registered electors		6,375		▲422
Turnout		2,683	42.09	▼7.62
Rejected ballots		5	0.19	▼0.12
Labour hold				
Labour hold				
Labour hold				

=== 1993 by-election ===
The by-election took place on 6 May 1993.

=== 1990 election ===
The election took place on 3 May 1990.

1990 Westminster City Council election: Harrow Road
Party	Candidate	Votes	%	±%
Labour	Joseph Glickman	1,709	60.01	
Labour	Jillian Selbourne	1,672		
Labour	Alan Lazarus	1,643		
Conservative	Douglas Jacobs	909	31.92	
Conservative	Alexander Aiken	885		
Conservative	Peter Clarke	879		
Green	William Welch	245	8.06	
Green	Philip Chetwode-Ram	204		
Registered electors		5,953		
Turnout		2,959	49.71	
Rejected ballots		2	0.07	
Labour hold				
Labour hold				
Labour hold				

=== 1986 election ===
The election took place on 8 May 1986.

=== 1982 election ===
The election took place on 6 May 1982.

=== 1978 election ===
The election took place on 4 May 1978.

== 1968–1978 Westminster council elections ==
There was a revision of ward boundaries in Westminster in 1968.

=== 1974 election ===
The election took place on 2 May 1974.

1974 Westminster City Council election: Harrow Road
Party	Candidate	Votes	%	±%
Labour	S. Carter	2,003		
Labour	J. Glickman	1,934		
Labour	J. Keogh	1,920		
Labour	Illtyd Harrington	1,915		
Labour	T. Sheppard	1,884		
Conservative	A. Gemmill	766		
Conservative	E. Hohler	715		
Conservative	J. Kissin	710		
Conservative	F. Hastwell	698		
Conservative	P. Kirwan	694		
Squatters and Tenants	Piers Corbyn	152		
Save London Action Group	A. Darlington	135		
Turnout				
Labour hold		Swing		
Labour hold		Swing		
Labour hold		Swing		
Labour hold		Swing		
Labour hold		Swing		

=== 1971 by-election ===
The by-election took place on 15 July 1971.

=== 1971 election ===
The election took place on 13 May 1971.

=== 1968 election ===
The election took place on 9 May 1968.

== 1964–1968 Westminster council elections ==
External image
- Harrow Road ward boundaries from 1965 to 1968

=== 1964 by-election ===
The by-election took place on 2 July 1964.

1964 Harrow Road by-election
Party	Candidate	Votes	%	±%
Labour	T. G. Sheppard	unopposed		
Labour hold				

=== 1964 election ===
The election took place on 7 May 1964.

1964 Westminster City Council election: Harrow Road
Party	Candidate	Votes	%	±%
Labour	G. F. Bulmer	2,265		
Labour	H. E. Browne	2,257		
Labour	W. D. Goss	2,249		
Labour	Illtyd Harrington	2,243		
Labour	A. A. Dumont	2,240		
Conservative	S. W. Y. Cottrell	843		
Conservative	H. H. Hodgson	757		
Conservative	L. T. Sheldrake	726		
Conservative	M. P. Nulloth	722		
Conservative	A. J. Welch	710		
Communist	R. Vizard	164		
Turnout		3,178	20.2	
Labour win (new seat)				
Labour win (new seat)				
Labour win (new seat)				
Labour win (new seat)				
Labour win (new seat)				
