= 1939 Macclesfield by-election =

UK Parliamentary by-election

The 1939 Macclesfield by-election was held on 22 November 1939. The by-election was held due to the resignation of the incumbent Conservative MP, John Remer. The only candidate nominated was W. Garfield Weston, also representing the Conservative Party, who was elected unopposed.
