= John Brocklehurst (politician) =

British politician

John Brocklehurst, DL, MP (30 October 1788 – 13 August 1870), known as John Brocklehurst the younger, was an English silk manufacturer, banker and Liberal Party politician from Macclesfield in Cheshire. He sat in the House of Commons for 36 years, from 1832 to 1868.

Brocklehurst was the second of three sons of John Brocklehurst, of Macclesfield and Lea Hall in Cheshire, and became a partner in one of the most successful banking and silk-manufacturing companies in Macclesfield.

Under the Reform Act 1832, the town gained the right to elect two Members of Parliament (MPs), and Brocklehurst was elected at the 1832 general election as one of the first two MPs for the newly enfranchised borough of Macclesfield. He held the seat through nine further elections until he retired from Parliament at the 1868 general election, when his eldest son William Coare Brocklehurst was elected in his place. He attended the House of Commons regularly, and although rarely spoke in the chamber, he was held in great respect by advanced Liberals. He was both a magistrate and a Deputy Lieutenant of the County Palatine of Cheshire.

== Family ==
Brocklehurst married Mary Coare, with whom he had four daughters and four sons in 1814. These included:

- William Coare Brocklehurst (1818–1900), who succeeded his father as one of Macclesfield's MPs
- Henry Brocklehurst (1819–1870), the father of John Brocklehurst, 1st Baron Ranksborough (1852-1921) and Henry Dent-Brocklehurst (1856-1932) whose grandson was Mark Dent-Brocklehurst
- Emma Dent (1823–1900) who married the heir to Sudeley Castle in Gloucestershire, and spent much of her life restoring the property, laying out the gardens, and collecting antiquities and artefacts
- Philip Lancaster Brocklehurst (1827–1904) who inherited the Swythamley sporting estate in Staffordshire from his uncle William, and was created a baronet in 1903
- Marianne Brocklehurst (1832–1898) was a noted traveller and collector of Egyptian antiquities who, along with her brother Philip donated her collection to the West Park Museum in Macclesfield.

Parliament of the United Kingdom
New constituency	Member of Parliament for Macclesfield; 1832 – 1868; With: John Ryle 1832–1837; Thomas Grimsditch 1837–1847; John Williams 1847–1852; Edward Egerton 1852–1868	Succeeded by David Chadwick; William Brocklehurst
