= David Chadwick (politician, born 1821) =

English accountant and Liberal Party politician

David Chadwick (23 December 1821 – 19 September 1895) was an English accountant and Liberal Party politician. He sat in the House of Commons from 1868 to 1880.

== Early life ==
David Chadwick was the son of John Chadwick, who was originally from Macclesfield but later moved to Manchester.

Chadwick was educated in Manchester, and began training as an accountant in 1843. By 1870 he was a senior partner in Chadwicks, Adamson, Collier, and Co., based in London and Manchester. He was a President of the Manchester Statistical Society, the first president of the Manchester Institute of Accountants, an associate of the Institution of Civil Engineers. and was elected to the membership of Manchester Literary and Philosophical Society on 20 April 1852

At the 1865 general election, Chadwick unsuccessfully contested the borough of Macclesfield, but he won the seat at the 1868 general election. Macclesfield then had two Members of Parliament (MPs), and Chadwick and his fellow Liberal MP William Coare Brocklehurst were re-elected in 1874 and in 1880. However, an election petition was lodged against the result of the 1880 general election in Macclesfield, and the result was declared void on 22 June 1880. The Election Court found that an organised system of bribery and treating by the Liberal election agent had prevailed at the election; Chadwick and Brocklehurst were both unseated and a Royal Commission was appointed to investigate. The inquiry opened on 1 October 1880, which found that there had been extensive bribery in the borough. The writ was suspended, and the borough lost its right to representation in Parliament. William Mair, Liberal agent at the election, told the court that he had promised Chadwick that no money would be spent illegally. He was convicted in July 1881 of bribery and of making a false return of election expenses. Chadwick did not stand again.

Chadwick was also a prolific writer on a range of topics. His works included Suggestions for an Equitable Redistribution of Parliamentary Representation, The Financial Aspect of the Sanitary Question, Poor Rates and Principle of Rating, Social and Educational Statistics of Manchester, and The Rate of Wages in 200 Trades for 20 Years. He was described in 1870 as being "in favour of the ballot, national education, and reduction in national expenditure".

He erected the Macclesfield Free Library, and presented it to the town's corporation. He was also a governor of the estate of the Royal Holloway College in Surrey.

== Family ==
Chadwick married twice, firstly in 1844 to Louisa Bow, daughter of William Bow of Broughton. Louisa died in 1873, and in 1878 he married Ursula Sopwith, daughter of the civil engineer Thomas Sopwith.

Chadwick died on 19 September 1895, aged 73, at his home The Poplars in Herne Hill, London and was buried at West Norwood Cemetery.

Parliament of the United Kingdom
Preceded by John Brocklehurst; Edward Egerton	Member of Parliament for Macclesfield; 1868 – 1880; With: William Brocklehurst	writ suspended
Professional and academic associations
Preceded by Alfred Asplan	President of the Manchester Statistical Society; 1865–67	Succeeded by William Langton
