= John Williams (Macclesfield MP) =

English Liberal politician

John Williams (died 29 November 1855) was an English Liberal Party politician.

He was elected at the 1847 general election as one of the two Members of Parliament (MPs) for the borough of Macclesfield in Cheshire, but was defeated at the 1852 general election by the Conservative Party candidate Edward Egerton.

Parliament of the United Kingdom
Preceded by Thomas Grimsditch; John Brocklehurst	Member of Parliament for Macclesfield; 1847 – 1852; With: John Brocklehurst	Succeeded by Edward Egerton; John Brocklehurst
