= Paradise Mill =

Former silk mill in Macclesfield, England

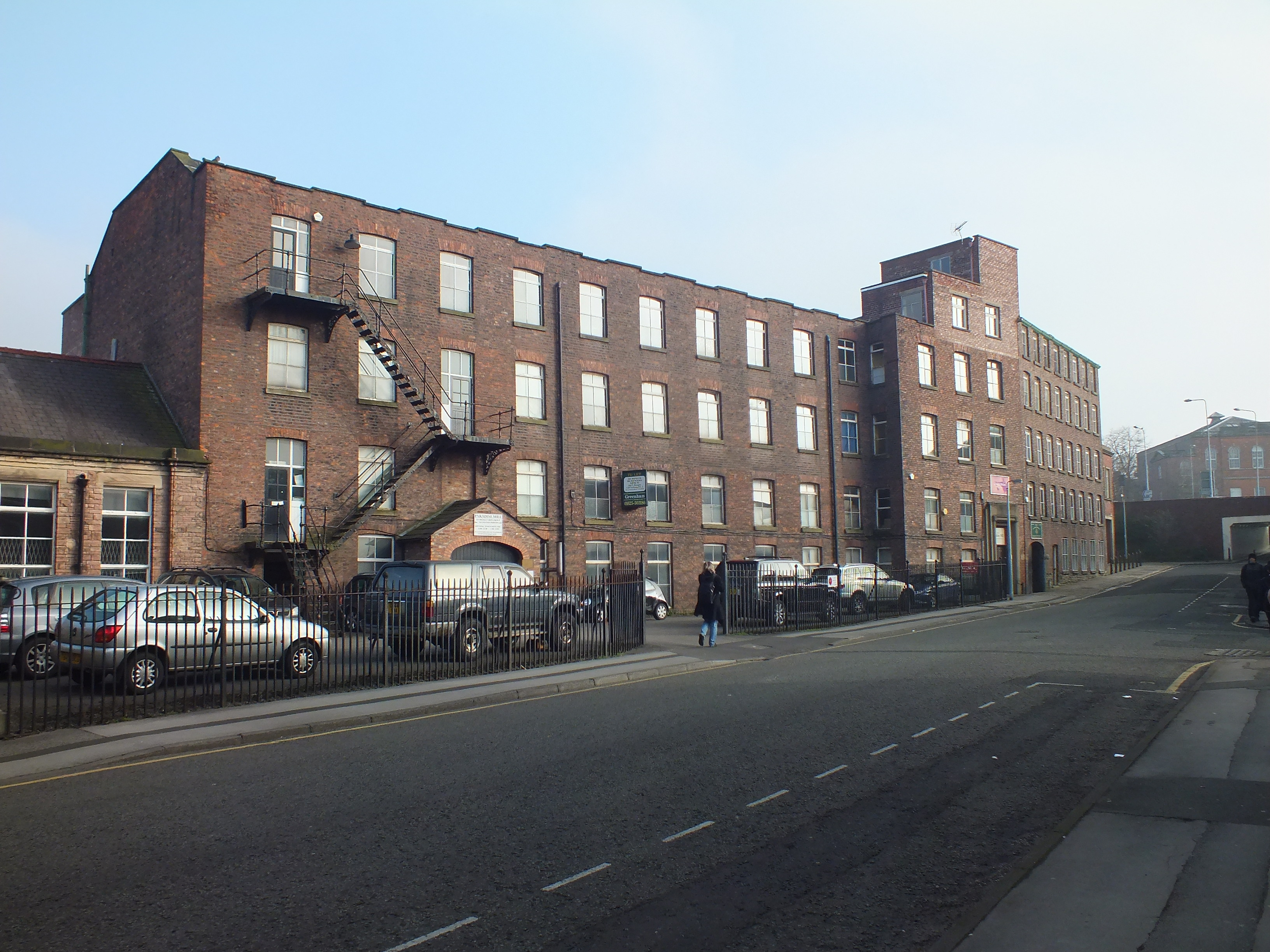

- Location within Cheshire Location within the United Kingdom

General information
- Type: Silk Mill

Listed Building – Grade II
- Official name: Lower Paradise Mill
- Designated: 1 June 1982
- Reference no.: 1279976

Listed Building – Grade II
- Official name: Upper Paradise Mill
- Designated: 28 October 1994
- Reference no.: 1220886
- Location: Macclesfield, Cheshire East, SK11 6TJ
- Coordinates: 53.2557°N 2.1247°W
- Completed: 1824/1862

Paradise Mill is a former silk mill and Grade II listed building in Macclesfield, Cheshire East, England. The mill consists of two adjoining buildings, listed separately on Historic England as Lower Paradise Mill and Upper Paradise Mill.

Lower Paradise Mill operates as part of the Macclesfield Museums and contains an exhibit of restored Jacquard handlooms, some of which are in working order. Upper Paradise Mill was converted into flats in 2020.

Paradise Mill produced luxury silks for more than a century, between 1862 and 1981.

== History ==
Upper Paradise Mill was constructed in 1824.

Lower Paradise Mill was constructed in 1862 after the land was bought by John Bagshaw. The building replaced an existing cotton mill that had stood on the site since at least 1791.

By 1891, the mills were used exclusively for manufacturing silk, where they had earlier produced multiple fabrics.

The mill was operated by the manufacturers Arthur Cartwright and Percy Sheldon, who bought the mill in 1920. The Cartwright and Sheldon firm ran the mill until closure in 1981.

== Upper Mill redevelopment ==
Both mill buildings were sold to the local Allmand-Smith family in the early 1980s.

The Upper Paradise Mill was repurposed into offices some time after the purchase in the 1980s, however after the building had remained vacant for an extended period in the 2010s plans were made to convert the building into apartments. Conversion plans were approved in 2016, and completed in 2020.

== Lower Mill redevelopment and museum ==
When the mill buildings were sold to the Allmand-Smith family in the 1980s, the family helped to open Lower Paradise Mill Museum. It opened as a museum in 1984.

The museum houses Europe's largest collection of Jacquard silk handlooms, with 26 looms in total.

Paradise Mill was shut for nine months for restoration work on the building between May 2023 and February 2024, after a £309k National Heritage Memorial Fund-backed restoration project.

The team at the Silk Museum restored two of the Jacquard handlooms back to working order in 2024, with plans to restore more.

In 2025, the roof was restored to upgrade weatherproofing and insulation. The roof renovations won within the Heritage Conservation category of the 2025 Daylight from Above awards.

Starting in 2026, the Silk Museum offered self-guided tours of the Lower Paradise Mill exhibit, where previously only guided tours were available.

== See also ==
- Listed buildings in Macclesfield
- Macclesfield Museums
- Silk industry in Cheshire
