= William Bromley-Davenport (British Army officer) =

British Army officer and politician

Brigadier-General Sir William Bromley-Davenport KCB CMG CBE DSO TD JP DL
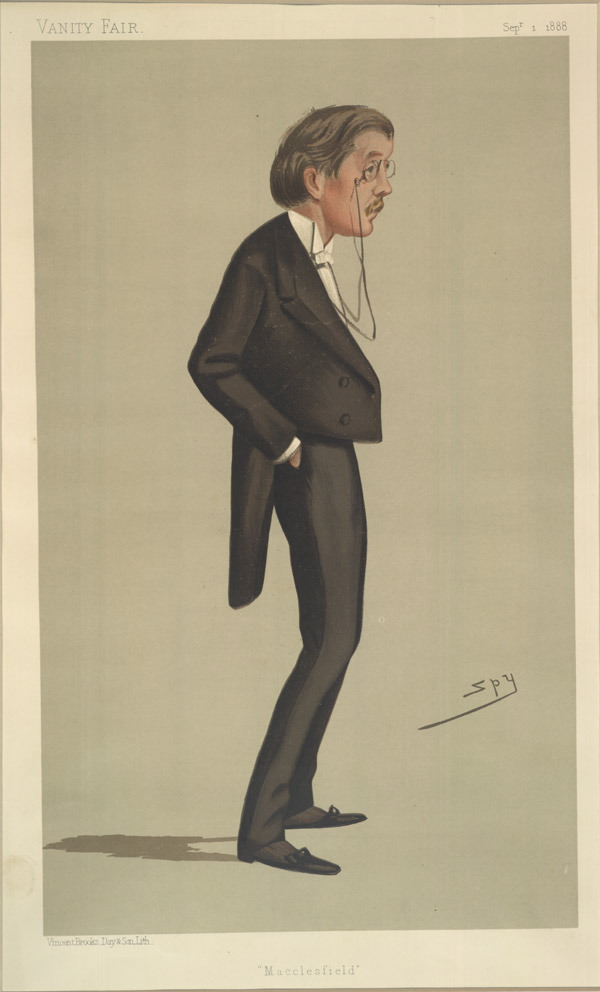
- Caricature of Bromley-Davenport in Vanity Fair

Financial Secretary to the War Office
- In office 12 October 1903 – 4 December 1905
- Monarch: Edward VII
- Prime Minister: Arthur Balfour
- Preceded by: Lord Stanley
- Succeeded by: Thomas Buchanan

Personal details
- Born: 21 January 1862 Belgravia, London
- Died: 6 February 1949 (aged 87) Capesthorne Hall, Cheshire, England
- Party: Conservative
- Education: Balliol College, Oxford

Brigadier-General Sir William Bromley-Davenport, KCB, CMG, CBE, DSO, TD, JP, DL (21 January 1862 – 6 February 1949) was a British soldier, footballer and Conservative politician. He fought with distinction in both the Second Boer War and the First World War. An MP from 1886 to 1906, he held political office under Arthur Balfour as Financial Secretary to the War Office from 1903 to 1905.

He was a notable footballer, scoring twice for England against Wales in the 1883–84 British Home Championship, the world's first international tournament, though restricted to the Home Nations.

== Background and education ==
Bromley-Davenport was born at 5 Lowndes Street, Belgravia, London, the son of William Bromley Davenport and his wife, Augusta Elizabeth Campbell, daughter of Walter Campbell, of Islay. He was educated at Eton and Balliol College, Oxford.

== Footballing career ==
Bromley-Davenport played football for Oxford University and Old Etonians. He represented England on two occasions in March 1884, against Scotland and Wales respectively. A centre-forward, he scored two goals in the game against Wales.

== Political and military career ==
Bromley-Davenport was elected Member of Parliament for Macclesfield in the July 1886 general election. He was appointed a captain in the Staffordshire Yeomanry on 30 December 1891, and received the honorary rank of major on 28 February 1900. While an MP, he fought in the Second Boer War with the Imperial Yeomanry, where he was awarded the Distinguished Service Order (DSO) in November 1900. At the end of 1901, he was appointed a Deputy Lieutenant of Cheshire. He served in the Conservative administration of Arthur Balfour as Financial Secretary to the War Office from 1903 to 1905 and was a Civil Member of the Army Council from 1904 to 1905. However, he lost his seat in the House of Commons in the 1906 Liberal landslide.

During the First World War, Bromley-Davenport commanded the 22nd Mounted Brigade of the Egyptian Expeditionary Force with the rank of Brigadier-General from 1916 to 1917. He was also Assistant Director of Labour from 1917 to 1918. Between 1920 and 1949 he held the honorary post of Lord-Lieutenant of Cheshire. He was made a Companion of the Order of St Michael and St George (CMG) in 1918, a Commander of the Order of the British Empire (CBE) in 1919, a Companion of the Order of the Bath in the 1922 Birthday Honours and a Knight Commander of that Order (KCB) in 1924.

== Personal life ==
Bromley-Davenport's seat was Capesthorne Hall, Cheshire. He died there unmarried in February 1949, aged 87.

Parliament of the United Kingdom
Preceded by William Brocklehurst	Member of Parliament for Macclesfield; 1886–1906	Succeeded by William Brocklehurst
Political offices
Preceded by Lord Stanley	Financial Secretary to the War Office; 1902–1905	Succeeded by Thomas Buchanan
Honorary titles
Preceded by The Duke of Westminster	Lord Lieutenant of Cheshire; 1920–1949	Succeeded by The Viscount Leverhulme
