= Edward Egerton =

British Conservative politician

Parliamentary Under-Secretary of State for Foreign Affairs
- In office 6 July 1866 – 1 December 1868
- Monarch: Victoria
- Prime Minister: The Earl of Derby; Benjamin Disraeli
- Preceded by: Austen Henry Layard
- Succeeded by: Arthur Otway

Personal details
- Born: 27 July 1816
- Died: 27 August 1869 (aged 53)
- Party: Conservative
- Spouse(s): Lady Mary Pierrepont (d. 1905)

Edward Christopher Egerton (27 July 1816 – 27 August 1869) was a British Conservative politician from the Egerton family.

== Background ==
Egerton was the son of Wilbraham Egerton and Elizabeth, daughter of Sir Christopher Sykes, 2nd Baronet. William Egerton, 1st Baron Egerton, was his elder brother.

== Political career ==
Egerton sat as Member of Parliament for Macclesfield from 1852 to 1868 and for Cheshire East from 1868 to 1869. He served under the Earl of Derby and later Benjamin Disraeli as Parliamentary Under-Secretary of State for Foreign Affairs between 1866 and 1868.

== Family ==
Egerton married Lady Mary Frances, daughter of Charles Pierrepont, 2nd Earl Manvers, in 1845. Together they had two sons:

- Hugh Edward,
- Charles Augustus (24 Aug. 1846-13 Oct. 1912), who married Lady Mabel Annie Brassey, daughter of Thomas Brassey, 1st Earl Brassey and Lady Anna Allnutt. They had five children including Vice-Adm. Henry Egerton who married Marion France Theresa Beckett, the daughter of Sir William Gervase Beckett, 1st Baronet and sister-in-law to Prime Minister Anthony Eden.

He died in August 1869, aged 53. Lady Mary remained a widow until her death in June 1905.

Parliament of the United Kingdom
Preceded by John Brocklehurst; John Williams	Member of Parliament for Macclesfield; 1852–1868; With: John Brocklehurst	Succeeded by David Chadwick; William Coare Brocklehurst
New constituency	Member of Parliament for Cheshire East; 1868–1869; With: William Legh	Succeeded by William Legh; William Cunliffe Brooks
Political offices
Preceded by Austen Henry Layard	Under-Secretary of State for Foreign Affairs; 1866–1868	Succeeded by Arthur Otway
