= John Remer =

British politician (1883–1948)

John Rumney Remer

Member of Parliament for Macclesfield
- In office 1918 – 6 November 1939
- Succeeded by: Arthur Vere Harvey

Personal details
- Born: 7 February 1883
- Died: 12 March 1948 (aged 65)
- Party: Conservative

John Rumney Remer (2 July 1883 – 12 March 1948) was a British Conservative Party politician. He was elected as the Member of Parliament (MP) for Macclesfield at the 1918 general election, and was re-elected at six further general elections. He resigned from Parliament on 6 November 1939 by appointment as Steward of the Chiltern Hundreds.

John Remer's papers are held by the John Rylands Library, Deansgate of the University of Manchester.

Parliament of the United Kingdom
Preceded by William Brocklehurst	Member of Parliament for Macclesfield; 1918 – 1939	Succeeded by W. Garfield Weston
