= Financial Secretary to the War Office =

United Kingdom Office of the Financial Secretary to the War Office
- Seal of H.M. Government
- War Office
- Style: The Right Honourable (formal prefix); Financial Secretary to the War Office
- Seat: Westminster, London
- Appointer: The British Monarch (on advice of the Prime Minister)
- Term length: No fixed term
- Formation: 1870-1964
- First holder: John Vivian
- Final holder: Peter Kirk

The Financial Secretary to the War Office and for certain periods known as the Finance Member of the Army Council, was a junior ministerial office of the British government established in 1870. In May 1947 the office was unified with that of the Parliamentary Under Secretary of State for War under a new title Parliamentary Under Secretary of State and Financial Secretary of the War Office. The office continued until the War Office as a distinct service ministry was unified along with the Department of Admiralty and Air Ministry into the Ministry of Defence where it became known as the Army Department in April 1964.

== History ==
In 1870 a Financial Secretary to the War Office was appointed and was responsible to the Secretary of State for War, for estimates and for the appropriation, accounting and audit of funds voted for military purposes. The Audit and Accounts departments previously under a chief auditor of army accounts (office was abolished) were merged into a new Finance Department under the Accountant General now reporting to the Financial Secretary. Following organisational changes within the War Office between 1887 and 1888 he was given additional responsibilities. By the end of 1888 his department was renamed the Civil Department. At the same time the Finance Department was enlarged and renamed the Finance Division, which continued under the superintendence of the Accountant General.

In 1895 Accountant General changed his title to Assistant Financial Secretary and Accountant General of the Army. In 1902 the Finance Division was renamed the Finance Branch. In 1904 the Financial Secretary was restyled as the Finance Member (FM) of the Army Council with general responsibility for the finance of the Army. In 1907 his civil department was renamed the Department of the Finance Member until 1922 when both his title and department were altered to the Department of the Financial Secretary until 1939. His office and department reverted to its previous name the Department of the Finance Member in 1942. During this period the executive duties of his office were gradually transferred to the Permanent Secretary's department. In May 1947 the Army Council was reconstituted and unified his office with that of the Parliamentary Secretary into a single appointment as the Parliamentary Under Secretary of State and Financial Secretary to the War Office until 1964.

Prior to 1947 the office holder's department consisted of numerous departments and directorates, after 1947 he was solely concerned with general political aspects of financial policy and had no further roles were assigned to him.

== Office Holders ==
Date	Name
1870–1871	John Vivian
1871–1874	Henry Campbell-Bannerman
1874–1877	Frederick Stanley
1877–1880	Robert Loyd-Lindsay
1880–1882	Henry Campbell-Bannerman
1882–1885	Sir Arthur Hayter, 2nd Baronet
1885–1886	Henry Northcote
1886–1886	Herbert Gladstone
1886–1892	St John Brodrick
1892–1895	William Woodall
1895–1900	Joseph Powell Williams
1900–1903	Edward Stanley, Lord Stanley
1903–1905	William Bromley-Davenport
1905–1908	Thomas Buchanan
1908–1910	Francis Dyke Acland
1910–1911	Charles Mallet
1911–1912	Harold Tennant
1912–1915	Harold Baker
1915–1915	Francis Dyke Acland
1915–1919	Henry Forster
1919–1921	Sir Archibald Williamson, 1st Baronet
1921–1922	George Frederick Stanley
1922–1923	Francis Jackson
1923–1924	Rupert Gwynne
Jan–Nov, 1924	Jack Lawson
Nov, 1924–1928	Douglas King
1928–1929	Duff Cooper
1929–1930	Manny Shinwell
1930–1931	Captain, William Sanders
1931–1934	Duff Cooper
1934–1935	Douglas Hacking
1935–1940	Sir Victor Warrender, 8th Baronet
1940–1940	Sir Edward Grigg
1940–1941	Richard Law
1941–1943	Duncan Sandys
1943–1945	Arthur Henderson
May–Aug, 1945	Maurice Petherick
Aug 1945–1946	Frederick Bellenger
1946–1947	John Freeman
1947–1951	Michael Stewart
1951–1951	Woodrow Wyatt
1951–1954	James Hutchison
1954–1957	Fitzroy Maclean
1957–1958	Julian Amery
1958–1960	Hugh Fraser
1960–1963	James Ramsden
1963–Apr. 1964	Peter Kirk

== Sources ==
- "Financial Secretary to the War Office (Hansard)". api.parliament.uk. Hansard. Retrieved 25 September 2019.
- Joiner, J. H. (1990). One more river to cross : the story of British military bridging. Barnsley: Pen and Sword. ISBN 9780850527889.
- Roper, Michael (1998). The Records of the War Office and Related Departments, 1660-1964. London: Public Record Office. ISBN 9781873162453.
