= John Ryle (politician) =

British politician

John Ryle was a British politician.

Ryle lived in Macclesfield, where his father was prominent in the local silk and cotton trade. He married a granddaughter of Richard Arkwright in 1811, and became a banker. At the 1832 UK general election, he stood for the Tories in Macclesfield, winning a seat. In Parliament, he argued for limited reforms, and for protection to be given to the silk trade. He held his seat, after 1834 for the new Conservative Party, until the 1837 UK general election, when he was defeated.
