= William Brocklehurst (politician, born 1851) =

Businessman and Liberal Party politician (1851 – 1929)

Lieutenant-Colonel William Brocklehurst Brocklehurst (18 May 1851 – 27 June 1929) was a businessman and Liberal Party politician from Macclesfield in Cheshire. He sat in the House of Commons from 1906 to 1918.

The son of William Coare Brocklehurst MP, he was educated at Cheltenham College and at Magdalen College, Oxford. He became a senior partner in the family's silk manufacturing business, Brocklehurst and Son, lieutenant-colonel of the Cheshire Yeomanry, a member of Cheshire County Council, and a justice of the peace for Cheshire.

He was elected at the 1906 general election as the Member of Parliament (MP) for the Macclesfield division of Cheshire, defeating the sitting Unionist MP to win the seat previously held by his father. He was re-elected in January 1910 and December 1910, and stood down from Parliament at the 1918 general election.

Parliament of the United Kingdom
Preceded by William Bromley-Davenport	Member of Parliament for Macclesfield; 1906 – 1918	Succeeded by John Remer
