= John Brocklehurst (footballer) =

English footballer

Personal information
- Full name: John Fletcher Brocklehurst
- Date of birth: 15 December 1927
- Place of birth: Horwich, England
- Date of death: September 2005 (aged 77)
- Place of death: Lancashire, England
- Position: Wing half

Senior career*
Years	Team	Apps	(Gls)
	Stalybridge Celtic	?	(?)
1952–1953	Accrington Stanley	34	(0)
1953–1954	Stalybridge Celtic	?	(?)
1954–1956	Bradford Park Avenue	47	(1)
1956–1957	Wigan Athletic	3	(0)
Total		84	(1)
- * Club domestic league appearances and goals

John Fletcher Brocklehurst (15 December 1927 – September 2005) in Horwich, Lancashire, England, was an English professional footballer who played as a wing half in the Football League. He also played for Wigan Athletic in the Lancashire Combination, appearing three times in the 1956–57 season.
