= Macclesfield Museums =

Four museums in Macclesfield, Cheshire, England

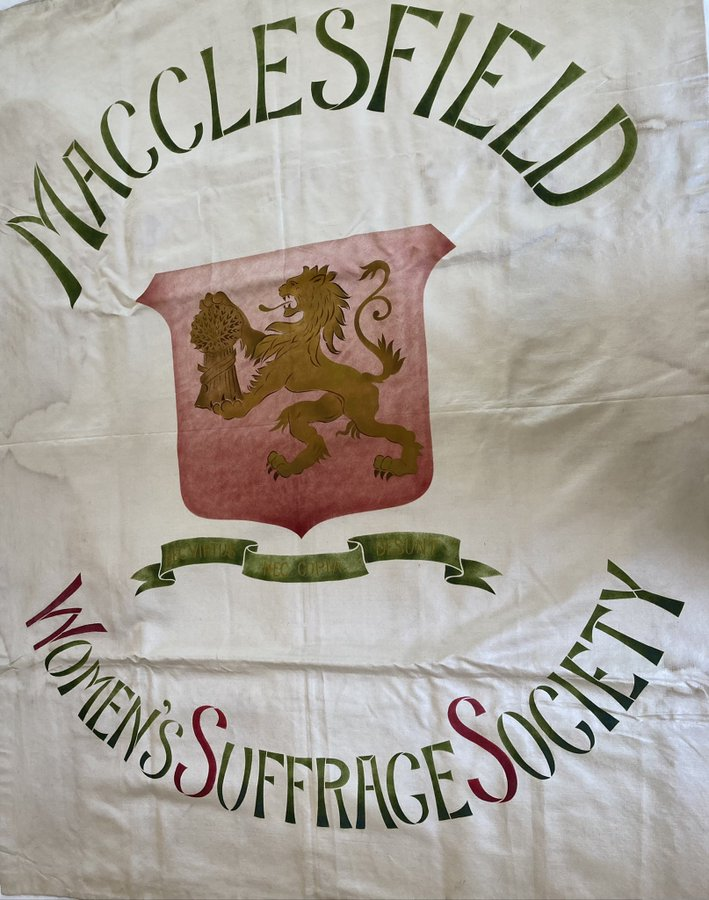
Macclesfield Women's Suffrage Society banner in Macclesfield museums - made in silk in 1911 by The Macclesfield School of Embroidery

Macclesfield Museums is a collection of four museums in England focusing on Macclesfield and the Silk industry. The museums are owned by Cheshire East, the local council, and are managed on their behalf by the Macclesfield Silk Heritage Trust. The museums are called The Silk Museum, Paradise Mill, West Park Museum (closed), and The Old Sunday School (no longer a museum).

== The Silk Museum ==
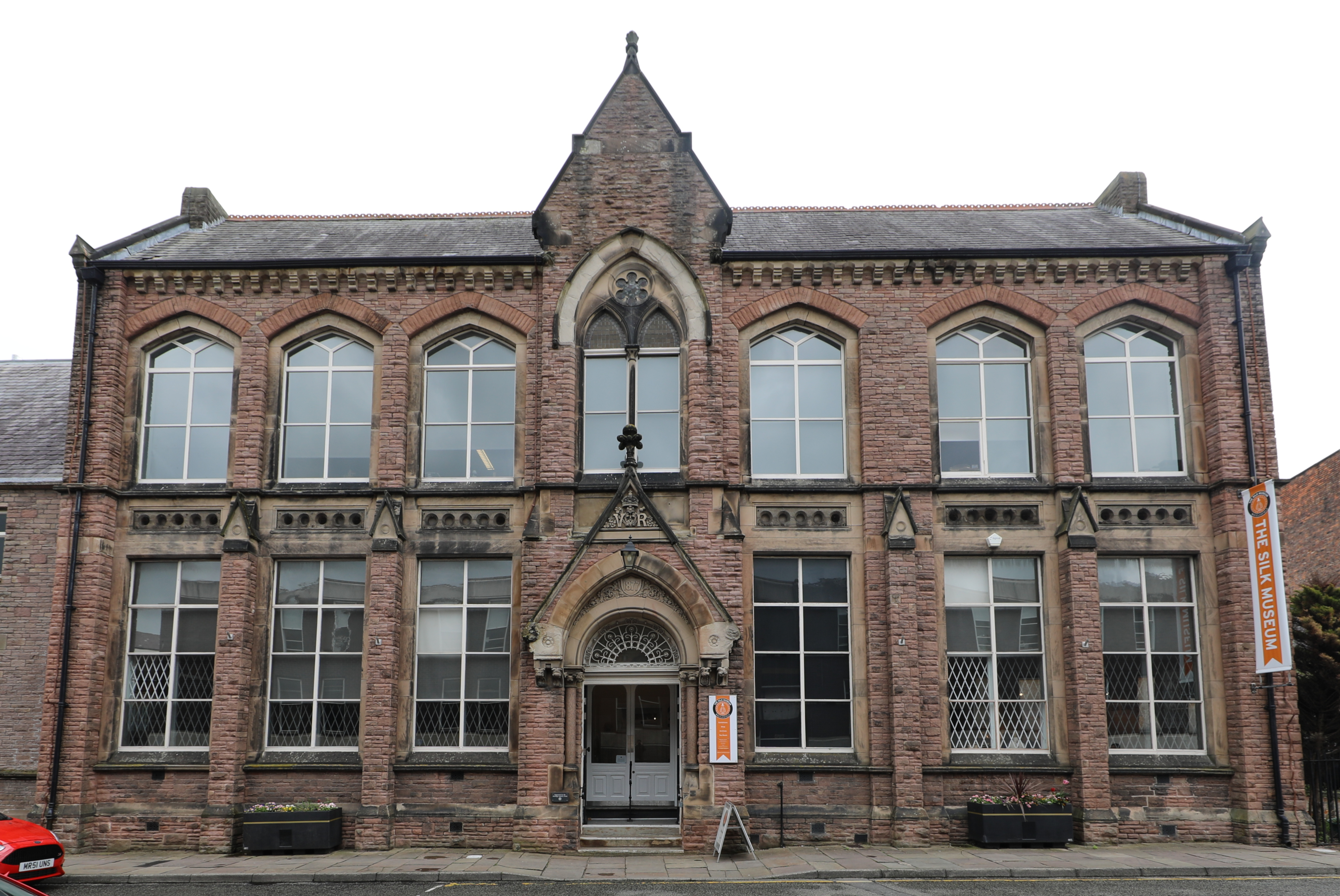
The Silk Museum

Macclesfield became a centre of the Silk Industry during the Industrial Revolution. The museum hosts a collection of silk artwork, weaving machines, and silk historical artifacts. The building was originally known as the Macclesfield School of Art and opened in 1877 to train designers for the silk trade.

== Paradise Mill ==
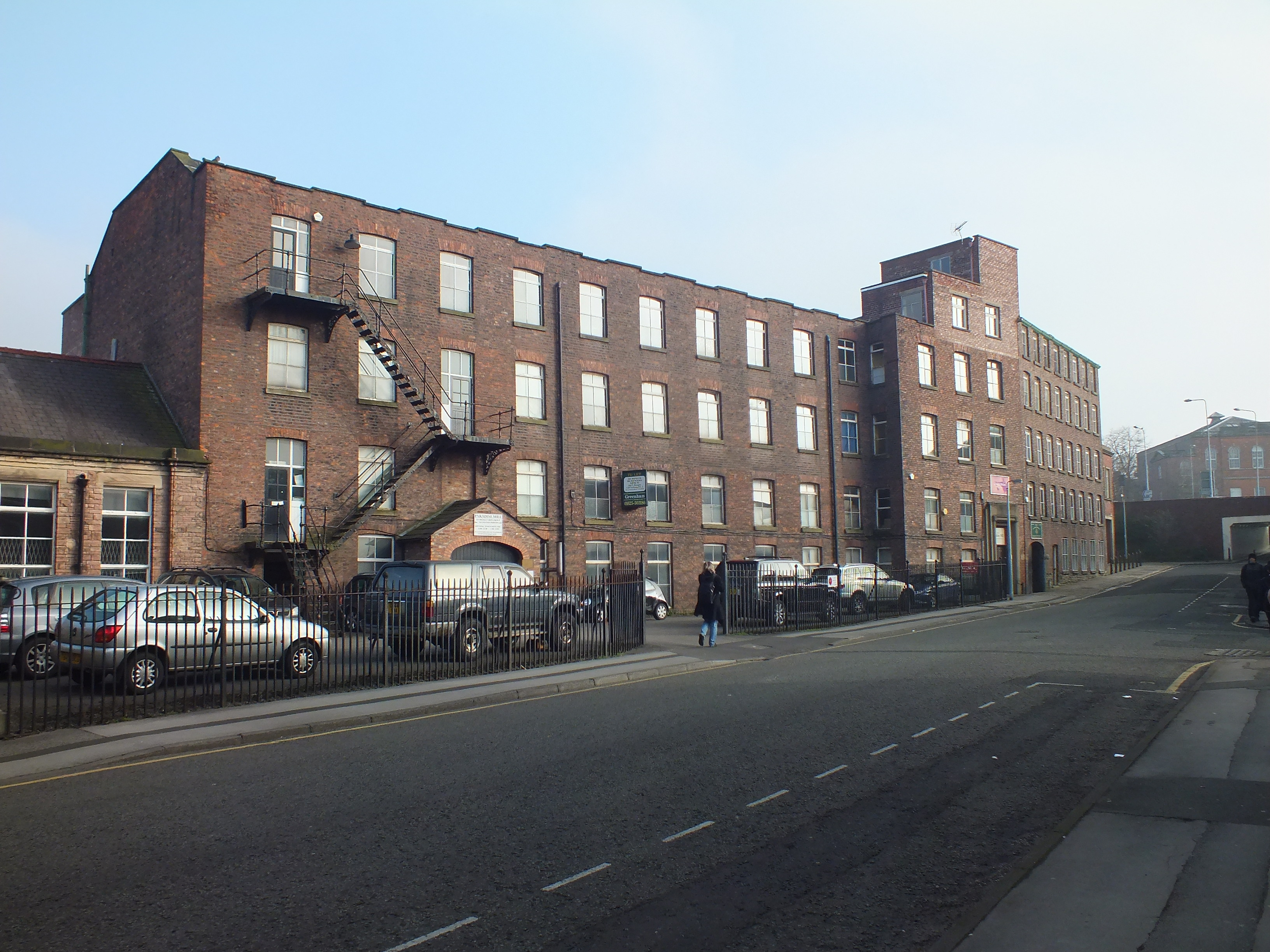
Paradise Mill

Paradise Mill is a former silk mill built in 1862, later converted into a working museum with 26 Jacquard looms. It is built in brick with Welsh slate roofs, is in four storeys, and has a 13-bay front. The right three bays project forward and contain an Art Deco entrance.

== West Park Museum ==
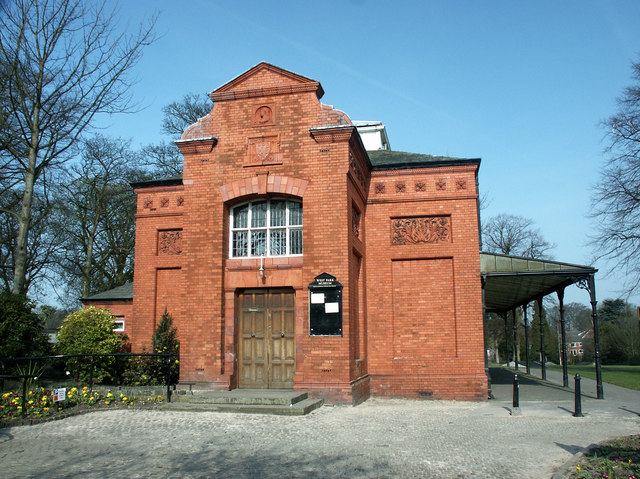
West Park Museum

This museum is currently closed with most of the collection being transferred to the Silk Museum.

West Park Museum was built by Marianne Brocklehurst, who came from a wealthy silk trade family, and houses her collection of Ancient Egyptian artifacts, a selection of fine art, and local history items. The refurbishment of the museum was proposed in 2018. The building, in West Park, is Grade II listed with Historic England. Constructed in 1897–98 it is built in brick with terracotta dressings and has a Welsh slate roof. It is in a single storey and consists of a single room lit from above by a clerestory. The entrance front has a shaped gable, decorative terracotta frieze and panels. There is a glass verandah on the right side.

== The Old Sunday School ==
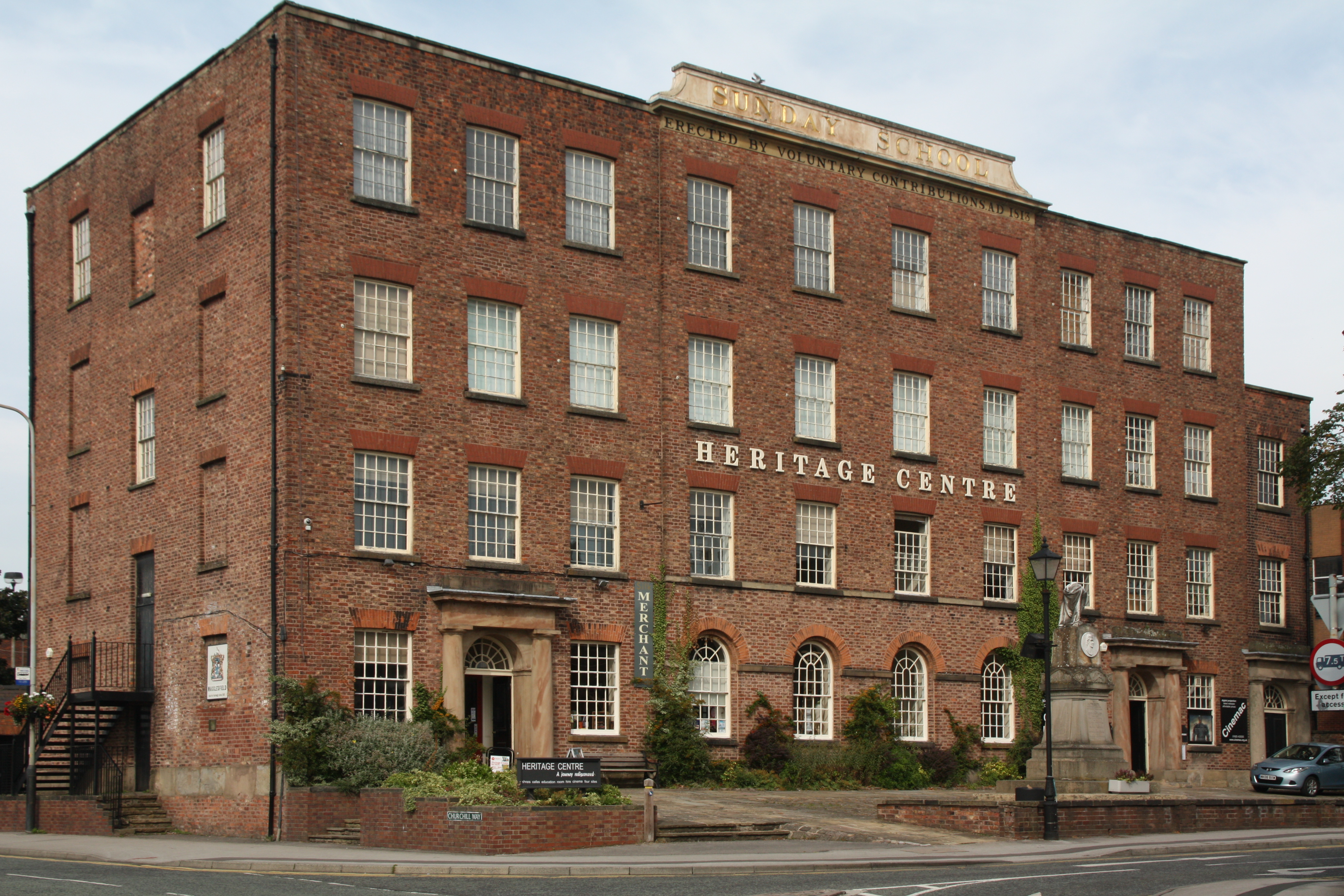
The Old Sunday School

Macclesfield Sunday School now called The Old Sunday School, was closed in September 1973. It had stopped keeping registers in 1967 when average attendance was fourteen. Though the fabric of the building was deteriorating, it was listed as a Grade II* building because of its historical significance. The building now has multiple uses which include a Museum with Victorian school room and a cinema.

== See also ==
- List of museums in Cheshire
- List of textile mills in Cheshire

== Sources ==
- Hartwell, Clare; Hyde, Matthew; Hubbard, Edward; Pevsner, Nikolaus (2011) [1971]. Cheshire, The Buildings of England. New Haven and London: Yale University Press. ISBN 978-0-300-17043-6.
