= Marianne Brocklehurst =

English traveller and collector of Egyptian antiquities (1832–1898)

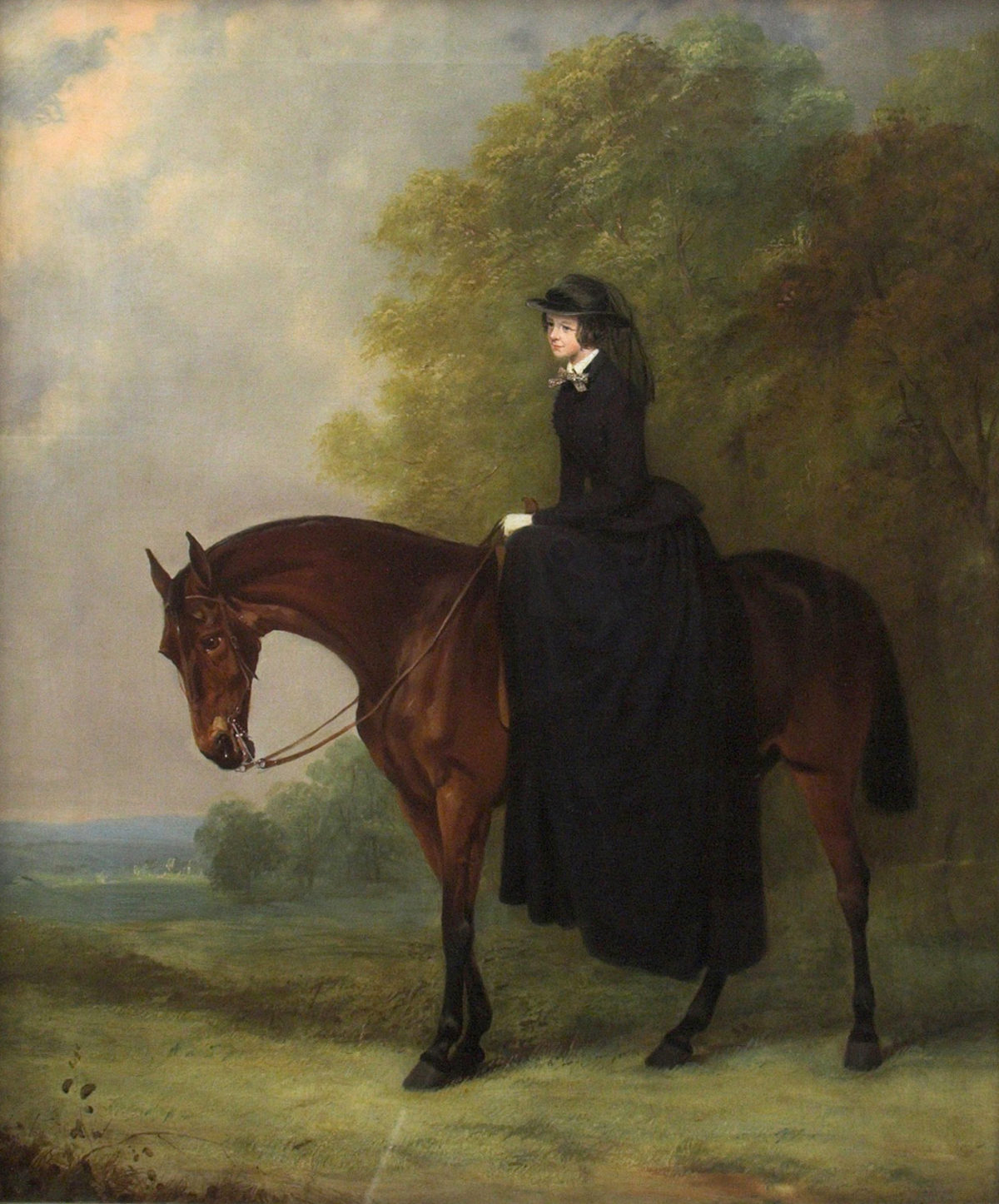
Marianne Brocklehurst on Horseback, by Henry Calvert, 1853

Marianne Brocklehurst (1832–1898) was an English traveller and collector of Egyptian antiquities. She supported a number of Egyptian excavations and donated most of her collection of antiquities to the West Park museum in Macclesfield.

== Personal life ==
Brocklehurst was one of the eight children of John Brocklehurst, a wealthy Macclesfield silk manufacturer, and his wife Mary. The family started out in the button making business, but they moved into silk in the 19th century. Marianne was born in 1832 and had travelled widely with her sister Emma from when she was around 20 years old. She had an early interest in archaeology and photography.

In 1861 she accepted a marriage proposal from one Henry Coventry, a distant relation of the Earls of Coventry, but her father made her end the relationship because her fiancé didn't have enough money. So Brocklehurst broke off the engagement. She had other suitors, but turned them all away. Her sister Emma said it was because Marianne was “not for marrying.” From the 1870s she shared her life with her companion Mary Booth. Brocklehurst and Booth shared a home, 'Bagstones', at Wincle outside Macclesfield.

Brocklehurst died in London in 1898. It is thought she died by suicide. Booth inherited the property and lived there until her own death in 1912. They are buried in the same grave, with a joint gravestone, in the churchyard at Wincle.

== Egyptology ==
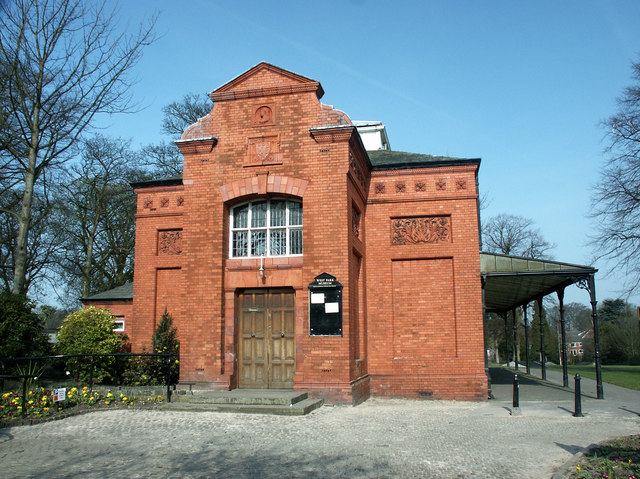
West Park museum, Macclesfield

In 1873 Marianne Brocklehurst and Mary Booth ('the two MBs') visited Egypt. While in Egypt, she met Amelia Edwards, another English traveller, who was travelling with Lucy Renshaw and their lady's maid Jenny Lane. The two parties sailed together in a flotilla up the Nile. Edwards later published her account of the journey in the bestselling A Thousand Miles up the Nile (1877). Brocklehurst's own travel diary of the voyage was published in 2005. Brocklehurst and Edwards competed with each other in the illegal extraction of antiquities from Egypt. Brocklehurst recounted a story called "How We Got Our Mummy" and it is in the appendix to her published diary. Brocklehurst and Booth returned to Egypt in 1876–1877 and in 1883. Their final trip was in 1890–1891. On the final trip they witnessed the removal of a large quantity of recently removed 21st Dynasty mummies from Thebes.

She made several drawings during her trips to Egypt, many of which show up in her published diary and some of which are displayed at various museums.

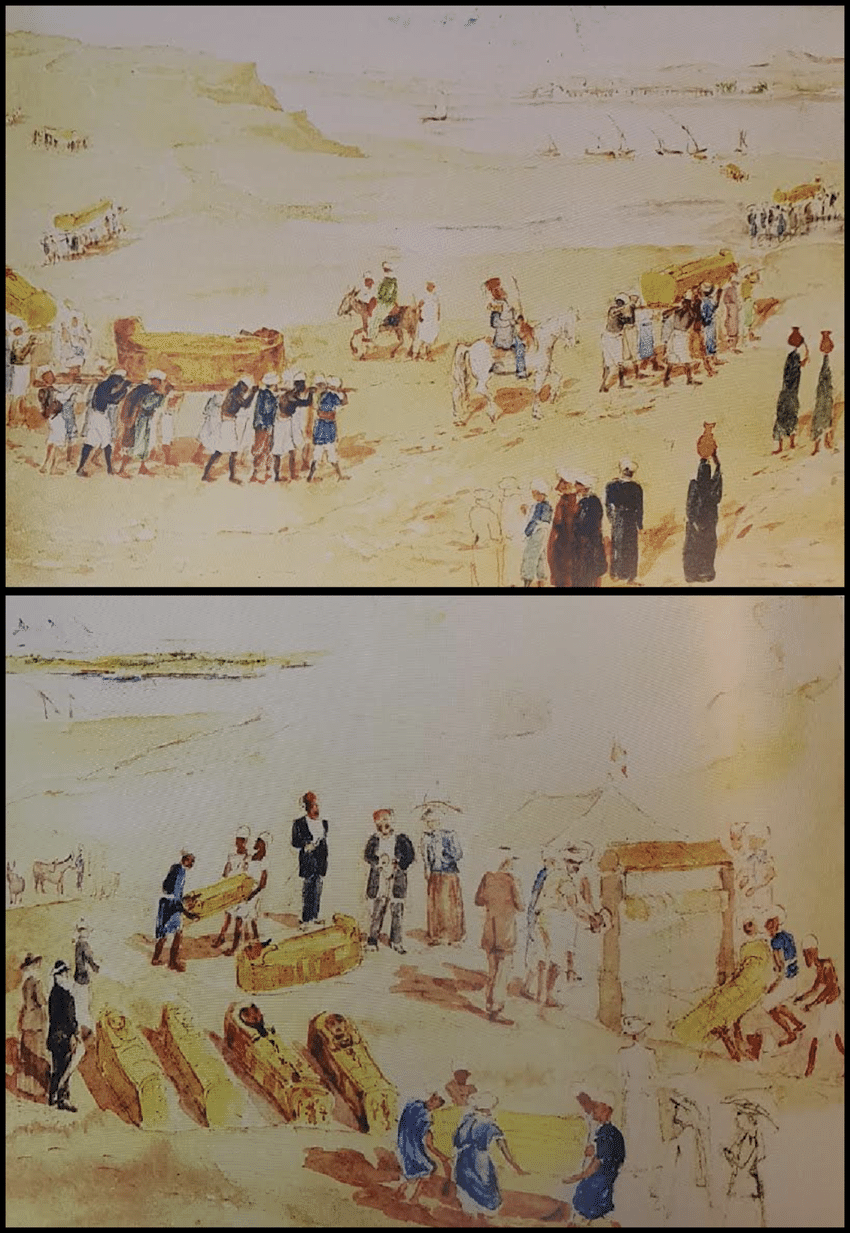
These drawings by Marianne Brocklehurst show the excavations at Deir el Bahri in 1891

Brocklehurst was a funder of excavation efforts. She contributed to Edwards' Egypt Exploration Fund, and was an early subscriber to the fund-raising efforts of Flinders Petrie. Through these connections she acquired a number of artefacts. Brocklehurst offered funding to the local council to build a museum to hold these objects, and as a result Macclesfield's West Park museum was opened in 1898. There was some dispute between the Brocklehursts and the council about the building of the museum, and she remained in London on the opening day.
