= William Brocklehurst (politician, born 1818) =

British politician

William Coare Brocklehurst (9 February 1818 – 3 June 1900) was an English Liberal Party politician and head of a family of silk producers in Macclesfield in the 19th century. He sat in the House of Commons from 1868 to 1880 and from 1885 to 1886.

William Brocklehurst was the son of John Brocklehurst and Mary Coare. He was elected at the 1868 general election as one of the two Members of Parliament (MPs) for the borough of Macclesfield, where he was re-elected in 1874 and 1880. The result of the 1880 general election in Macclesfield was declared void on 22 June 1880, after an election petition. Brocklehurst and his fellow MP David Chadwick were both unseated, and a Royal Commission was appointed which found that there had been extensive bribery in the borough. The writ was suspended, and the borough lost its right to representation in Parliament.

The Redistribution of Seats Act 1885 abolished the parliamentary borough of Macclesfield, but created a new single-seat county division of Cheshire, which bore the same name but covered a wider area. Brocklehurst was elected at the 1885 general election as the first MP for the new division, but did not stand again at the 1886 general election.

The Brocklehurst family of Brocklehurst-Whiston mill acquired Butley Hall in 1861, and the Bollingtonfield Estate in 1884, naming it Butley Cottage. It is currently a hotel known as White House Manor.

Brocklehurst was a Justice of the Peace for Cheshire, and in 1870 he was president of the Macclesfield Chamber of Commerce. In 1895 the Macclesfield High School for Girls was established in a building bought from Brocklehurst. He died in June 1900, the 18 August 1900 edition of 'The Nursing Record & Hospital World' records that he left £1000 to the endowment fund of Macclesfield Infirmary. He also left £1500 to the High School for Girls.

His elder son, William Brocklehurst (1851–1933), served as mayor of Macclesfield from 1883–1885, and the town's MP from 1906–1918.

== Sources ==
- A.J.S.Cartmell. "The History of Prestbury".
- "Butley Cottage, Prestbury". Archived from the original on 28 November 2006.
- "Macclesfield Mayors 1531 – 1995".
- "The Nursing Record & Hospital World" (PDF). p. 139.
- "The House of Commons Constituencies beginning with "M"". Archived from the original on 10 August 2009.

Parliament of the United Kingdom
Preceded by John Brocklehurst; Edward Egerton	Member of Parliament for Macclesfield; 1868–1880; With: David Chadwick	writ suspended
New constituency new county division	Member of Parliament for Macclesfield; 1885 – 1886	Succeeded by William Bromley-Davenport
