= Glimcher =

Glimcher is a surname. Notable people with the surname include:

- Arne Glimcher (born 1938), American art dealer, film producer and director
- Laurie Glimcher (born 1951), member of the National Academy of Sciences
- Paul Glimcher (born 1961), American economist, psychologist and neuroscientist
- Marc Glimcher (born 1963), American art dealer

== See also ==
- Glimcher Realty Trust was a Columbus, Ohio-based real estate investment trust founded by Herbert Glimcher
