= Bra murders =

Unsolved murders

- Other names: "The Stamford Bra Murders" "The Merritt Parkway Murders"

Details
- Victims: 5
- Span of crimes: 1967–1971
- Country: United States
- State: Connecticut

The Bra murders were a series of murders committed against four sex workers and one mother of four from 1967 to 1971 in Stamford, Connecticut. Most of the victims were African American or in active addiction, each had been strangled, sometimes with their own bras, from which the murders' moniker originated.

Benjamin Franklin Miller, a self-styled preacher from Norwalk, was charged and later acquitted by reason of insanity, spending the next 15 years in a mental institution before being released on appeal in 1988. His guilt has been questioned and remains the subject of debate to this day.

== Murders ==
The murders began on or after August 4, 1967, when 29-year-old Rose Ellen Pazda (known as "Sissi Rush") was reported missing from Stamford. Despite the authorities' efforts, they were unable to locate her until April 4, 1969, when her skeletonized remains were found. Due to the advanced state of decomposition, the coroner was unable to determine her exact date of death.

On May 2, 1968, 22-year-old Donna Roberts was reported missing and found dead on the next day, followed up by 21-year-old Gloria Conn on September 8, whose corpse was found only 60 yards away from where Roberts had been killed. Conn, from Mount Vernon, New York, was the only victim not native to Connecticut.

The next victim was 19-year-old Gail Thompson, who was found strangled on July 10, 1971, in an abandoned house. On August 22, the fifth and final confirmed victim, 34-year-old Alma T. Henry, was found inside a trash can by two passing motorists who were on their way to watch a football game. She differed significantly from previous victims, as she was not known to be a sex worker or in active addiction, but instead lived with her husband and four children in Southfield Village, a low-income housing project within Stamford.

According to the investigators' conclusions, the murders ceased after her death. They were quickly linked together by the fact that all victims had been found within 400 meters along Merritt Parkway and the fact that three of the victims (Roberts, Conn, and Henry) had been strangled with their own bras.

== Investigation ==
In April 1969, the Stamford police received a call from a man who identified himself as a preacher named James Miller. The caller then told them where they could find Pazda's remains, claiming in turn that he had been told of the location during a phone call with a man he did not know. As they wanted to question him in person, investigators compiled a list of every clergyman in the state who bore the surname Miller, which eventually drew their attention to a resident of Norwalk: a 42-year-old white man by the name of Benjamin Franklin Miller.

According to the investigators, Benjamin Franklin Miller Jr., a native of Aurora, Illinois, moved to Connecticut in 1948 and within a few years changed several occupations. He had shown signs of a mental illness as a teenager, and due to this, he was repeatedly incarcerated or interned at psychiatric clinics beginning in 1951. In 1962, he found a job as a postal clerk with the Postal Service, where he worked until early 1972. Miller was married and had a 12-year-old daughter, but was considered a loner by family members and coworkers.

Due to his introverted nature and trouble with communication, Miller had no close friends or meaningful relationships with relatives. As a religious fanatic, he distributed religious literature while sorting mail at work and reportedly admired evangelist Billy Graham. From time to time, he exhibited concerning behavior: he often felt anxious, fearful, agitated or depressed; was haunted by obsessive thoughts, suffered from hypochondria and had trouble sleeping. Miller spent most of his free time attending church in Stamford's African-American community, and from the mid-1960s, he became a self-styled preacher who exposed his religious beliefs and doctrines on a street corner, paying special attention to black girls and women.

The investigation into the murders was criticized by the aforementioned African-American community in Stamford, who accused the police of negligence due to the fact that the victims were poor, black women. Some called for an internal investigation to be conducted on the city's police department and for the negligent officers to be punished on the grounds that they violated civil rights.

== Arrest and prosecution of Miller ==
Once among the suspects, Miller was interrogated several times between late 1971 and early 1972. While he denied involvement in the killings, he admitted to having sex in his car with one of the victims, Gail Thompson. Forensic examinations revealed no biological traces or signs of sexual intercourse on Thompson's body immediately prior to her death, but suspicions against Miller grew when he provided details about the killing which were not known to the public. According to investigators, once he was presented with photographs of the victims, Miller supposedly claimed that Thompson had been strangled with a handkerchief, not a bra - this contrasted with what was said in the media, which stated all five had been strangled with bras.

In late 1971, Miller agreed to undergo a polygraph test, but the results were inconclusive due to his unsound mind. As a result, he was ordered to undergo a psychiatric evaluation, which concluded that Miller had schizophrenia. Due to this, he was interned for treatment at the Fairfield Hills Hospital on February 17, and during his internment, he exhibited symptoms of hypochondria and clinical delusions.

After some time, Miller suddenly confessed to the murders to a psychiatrist and declared that he wanted to talk to investigators working on the case. On February 29, Miller confessed to killing seven women in total, and according to investigators, he described killing Thompson in detail and indicated where three others had been dumped. On March 1, he recreated various aspects of the crime scenes on-site. Due to this, he was arrested in front of the Fairfield Hills Hospital on March 18 and formally charged with the five murders. Following his arrest, representatives of the Stamford Police Department held a press conference to announce that they had arrested a suspect but declined to give details about what led to his arrest. The announcement was met with skepticism from members of the black community in Stamford, who believed that Miller was simply a scapegoat.

After the arraignment, Miller recanted his confession. At the trial, his father appeared as a witness for the defense and told the court that his son called him after he confessed to the murders, claiming that he was insane and that the policemen had duped him into confessing without verifying his claims. He also said that they used coercive tactics such as threatening to beat him, exposing his infidelity, make him lose his job and custody of his child if he did not sign the confession. When pressed to explain what happened at the crime scene recreations, he said that he was unable to recall the circumstances of the murders and even factually inaccurate claims, despite knowing the area and expressing doubt about the investigators' conclusions.

Miller's attorneys eventually filed a motion to have him evaluated, with the results showing that he could not be legally held responsible for his actions due to his personality disorder and the hallucinations accompanying it. In February 1973, the prosecutor's office agreed to drop two of the murder charges, with Miller eventually being acquitted by reason of insanity of the remaining three. He was ordered to spend the next 25 years in a psychiatric facility and was subsequently transferred to one after his trial ended.

=== The alternative suspect ===
After Miller's trial, his relatives hired lawyers who got full access to his criminal case. They studied the content and found out about the existence of another potential suspect, but this was not disclosed by the prosecutor's office at trial and due to this, an appeal was filed.

The alternative suspect was a resident of Stamford named Robert Lupinacci, who was arrested in July 1972 while attempting to strangle a black sex worker in the same neighborhood where the other victims had been found. The investigators learned that he spent much of his free time in the city's red-light districts and was acquainted with many sex workers and pimps, despite being a known racist. The bodies of the three women supposedly murdered by Miller were found within thirty meters of where Lupinacci was arrested, and his car was spotted several times near the crime scenes. In 1967, he was spotted in several bars on the outskirts of Port Chester, New York, a place frequented by one of the victims, and employees at the Hazelton Hotel reported the following year that they had seen one of the victims staying in the same hotel room as Lupinacci.

In 1971, Lupinacci worked at the same motel where Gail Thompson, with whom he was allegedly acquainted, was staying. He was known to possess a heightened sex drive and was obsessed with sex, due to which he frequently viewed and collected pornographic photographs and videos. Following his arrest, police found a pornographic deck of cards in the trunk of his car, with the queen of hearts notably missing - a similar card was found near Thompson's body. Additionally, Thompson was last seen boarding a car whose color and features matched those of Lupinacci's car, and after discovering her remains, police found a witness who claimed that he had seen a vehicle similar to Lupinacci's cruising around the area several times. Upon searching the trunk of his car, investigators found several strands of hair, which were later determined to belong to a black woman. And finally, he was a member of a club called "The German-American Club", situated in the Gray Rocks Place neighborhood of Stamford, from where Henry disappeared in August 1971.

== Second trial and aftermath ==
In 1988, the Court of Appeals for the Second Circuit accepted the attorneys' petition and ordered a new trial for Miller. At the new trial, the court ruled that his confession was invalid because Stamford police had used coercive tactics during interrogations, with the judge ruling that this was likely a miscarriage of justice. Taking into account Miller's mental health; the low credibility of his confession; his health problems and evidence pointing towards Lupinacci's guilt, the charges against him were all dropped and he was officially acquitted.

After his release, Miller was housed in a homeless shelter for the mentally ill because, due to his isolated lifestyle and inability for social contact, he was deemed incapable of adapting to life in society. He lived in the shelter until his death in February 2010, aged 80.

Despite incriminating evidence, Lupinacci was never charged and later denied responsibility in a 2011 interview, but was forced to admit responsibility for assaulting the prostitute in 1972. After being released from prison, he married, had children, worked as an electrician, and seemingly ceased any criminal activity. He died in February 2013, at age 79. George Mayer, the lead investigator for the murders, consistently continued to deny that Lupinacci was responsible and insisted that Miller was the actual killer, a belief he held until his own death in 2013.

Ultimately, the real killer remains unidentified and all five cases officially remain unsolved.

== In the media ==
Miller was briefly mentioned on the third episode of the crime thriller television series Mindhunter, when an attempt to have him interviewed by FBI agent Holden Ford is turned down.

== See also ==
- List of serial killers in the United States
