= Arne Glimcher =

American film director (born 1938)

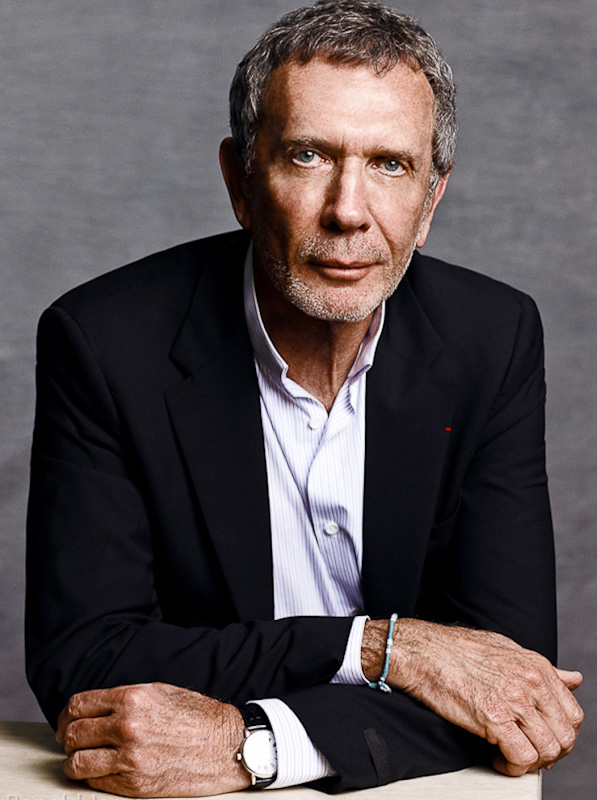
- Glimcher in the studio
- Born: March 12, 1938 (age 88); Duluth, Minnesota, U.S.
- Education: Massachusetts College of Art and Design, Boston University
- Occupations: Art dealer, film director, film producer
- Spouse: Milly Cooper
- Children: 2, Paul Glimcher, Marc Glimcher

Arnold "Arne" Glimcher (born March 12, 1938) is an American art dealer, gallerist, film producer, and film director. He is the founder of Pace Gallery, which by 2011 sold more than $400 million in art annually. He is the father of Marc Glimcher, who succeeded him as chairman of Pace, and American scientist Paul Glimcher. From 2013 to 2017, Arne and Marc Glimcher were included each year in the ArtReview annual list of the 100 most influential people in contemporary art.

Arne Glimcher also produced and directed several films, including The Mambo Kings (1990) and Just Cause (1995).

== Early life and education ==
Glimcher was born on March 12, 1938, into a Jewish family in Duluth, Minnesota, and raised in Boston. His father was a cattle rancher who owned a ranch in Minnesota. Arne was the youngest of four and was interested in art from an early age, which he developed by taking Saturday classes at the Museum of Fine Arts, Boston.

He later graduated from Massachusetts College of Art and Design and pursued an MFA at Boston University, where he took classes with sculptor Harold Tovish. Dissatisfied with the quality of his own art, Glimcher decided to pursue art history, hoping someday to be the director of the Museum of Modern Art.

== Early art dealership (1960-1990) ==
In 1960, at age 21, Glimcher founded Pace Gallery in Boston. He named the gallery after his father, who had recently died. In the Pace's first year, Glimcher primarily showed the work of professors from his MFA program--including Lawrence Kupferman, David Berger, and Albert Alcalay--and the gallery lost money. Its first success was a show by sculptor Louise Nevelson.

In 1963, Glimcher opened a second location for the gallery in New York City. Unable to compete at first with the established dealers of Pop Art, Glimcher initially represented Western sculptors such as James Turrell and Robert Irwin. He moved himself and his family to New York in 1965, closing the Boston location. Glimcher began a publishing division of the company, Pace Editions, in 1968.

In New York, Glimcher became friends with the painter Mark Rothko, who lived nearby. After the artist's death, his heirs and executors fought a decade-long legal battle known as the Rothko case with his former gallery, Marlborough Fine Art. At the case's conclusion, Rothko's heirs chose Glimcher as the new dealer for the estate.

In 1980, Glimcher sold Jasper Johns's Three Flags to the Whitney Museum of American Art for $1 million, the first time a work by a living artist had ever commanded seven figures. Glimcher also represented his former MassArt classmate Brice Marden before Marden moved to another dealer, Mary Boone. Glimcher's son Marc, who would later succeed Arne as the chairman, joined the Pace Gallery in 1985. The company bought a new large space in SoHo in 1990.

== PaceWildenstein merger and later decades (1993-) ==
The Pace Gallery merged with another gallery, Wildenstein & Company, in 1993, combining Pace's emphasis on contemporary art with Wildenstein's emphasis on Old Master and impressionist paintings. The merged gallery was titled PaceWildenstein. However, as collecting became more specialized, the concept of "one-stop shopping" for high-end art buyers became less sustainable. The two galleries separated back to their original names in 2010. Glimcher and Wildenstein both stated that the split was "amicable".

The Pace Gallery has represented contemporary artists including Julian Schnabel, Tara Donovan, David Hockney, Maya Lin and Kiki Smith. As of 2010, Pace also represented the estates of artists including Rothko, Willem de Kooning, Agnes Martin, Jean Dubuffet, Zhang Xiaogang, Robert Ryman, and Chuck Close. During Glimcher's career, he has worked with artists including Jean Dubuffet, Robert Rauschenberg, Louise Nevelson, and Lucas Samaras.

In 2022, at age 83, Glimcher opened an exhibition space in TriBeCa called Gallery 125 Newbury, named for the Pace Gallery's original address. It opened with a show featuring the work of Smith, Samaras, Alex Da Corte, Robert Gober, and Zhang Huan.

== Directorial work ==
Glimcher made his feature-film debut in a small role as an art dealer in Robert Benton's 1982 film Still of the Night. He later served as an associate producer on Ivan Reitman's 1986 film art-theft comedy Legal Eagles, for which the writers consulted him to add verisimilitude to the script; he also choreographed Daryl Hannah's performance scene in the film. Glimcher further developed a close friendship with Hollywood power broker Michael Ovitz, one of his regular clients. He went on to produce Gorillas in the Mist, and The Good Mother, both released in 1988.

Determined to direct a film himself, Glimcher began buying the rights to novels to option to studios. After a tip from a friend, he read and bought the rights to Oscar Hijuelos's novel The Mambo Kings Play Songs of Love before its publication. After the novel won the 1990 Pulitzer Prize for Fiction, Glimcher began to shop it around to studios, eventually winning the backing of Universal Pictures chairman Tom Pollock for a low-budget film. It became Glimcher's directorial debut in 1992 under the shortened title The Mambo Kings and received mostly positive reviews. Glimcher received an Academy Award Best Original Song nomination for the film's original song, Beautiful Maria of My Soul, which was also nominated for the Golden Globe Award for Best Original Song.

Glimcher later directed the 1995 film Just Cause, an adaptation of a John Katzenbach novel with Sean Connery and Laurence Fishburne in the lead roles. The film received mostly negative reviews, with a "Rotten" 26% rating on Rotten Tomatoes based on 31 reviews. In 1999, Glimcher directed The White River Kid which featured an ensemble cast, including Antonio Banderas from The Mambo Kings.

In 2008, following encouragement from director Martin Scorsese, Glimcher produced and directed the documentary film Picasso and Braque Go to the Movies. It explores the connection between early Cubist work by Pablo Picasso and Georges Braque and the birth of motion pictures in Paris by directors such as Auguste and Louis Lumière.

== Personal life ==
Glimcher is married to Milly Cooper. They maintain residences in New York's Upper East Side and East Hampton, where their holiday home was designed by Ulrich Franzen in 1983.
