= Walter P. Crabtree =

American architect

Walter P. Crabtree, Sr.
- Born: June 24, 1873; Rochester, New York
- Died: October 7, 1962 (aged 89)
- Occupation: Architect

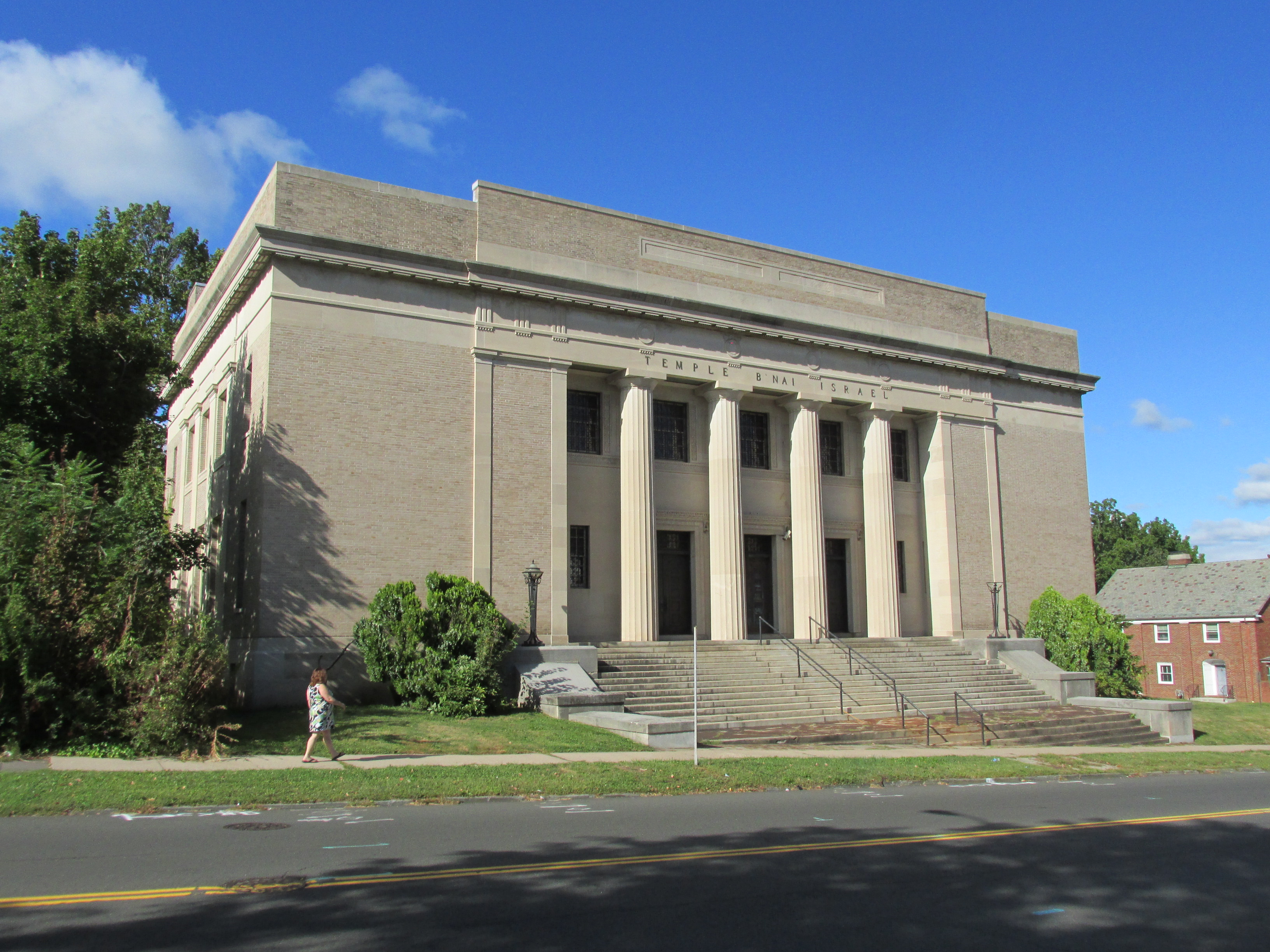
Masonic Temple, New Britain, 1927.

Walter Percival Crabtree (June 24, 1873 – October 7, 1962) was an American architect who worked in Connecticut. Some of his works are listed on the National Register of Historic Places. Crabtree was a native of Rochester, New York. He "received architectural training at Holyoke, Massachusetts, later moving to New Britain, where he was employed in the office of W.H.Cadwell, a well-known local architect", from 1901 to 1904. He worked on his own in New Britain from 1905 to 1928, and then in Hartford from then to 1942. He designed numerous business block buildings and private houses in New Britain and Hartford as well as in the surrounding areas.

Walter Crabtree was married to Julia Blanch Wilson and had several children. One of their children, daughter Priscilla Wilson Crabtree Converse (known as Polly), was born in Southampton, Massachusetts, was married to Stanley Witherell Converse, Sr. (known as "Stan") of Bridport, Vermont. Stan grew up on a dairy farm in Bridport and attended the University of Vermont and then later the Georgia Institute of Technology. Prior to their marriage Polly was a socialite and studied dress design in New York City. Not long after their wedding and deciding to follow opportunity, the Converses moved to Spartanburg, South Carolina around 1925 to work in and help run the family business The Clifton Manufacturing Company. Clifton Mills. a textile manufacturing company, had three large mills and was started by Stan's great uncle Dexter Edgar Converse. Dexter was also one of the principal founders of Converse College which is located in Spartanburg, South Carolina. Polly had two children: Stanley Witherell Converse, Jr. and Walter Crabtree Converse both in Spartanburg, South Carolina.

== Works ==
Works include (with attribution variations):

- Ernest R. Burwell House, 161 Grove St. Bristol, CT (Crabtree, Walter P.), NRHP-listed
- Francis H. Holmes House (1906), 349 Rocky Hill Ave. New Britain, CT (Crabtree, Walter P.), NRHP-listed
- Masonic Temple (New Britain, Connecticut), 265 W. Main St. New Britain, Connecticut (Crabtree, Walter P.), NRHP-listed
- B.P.0. Elks Lodge, New Britain, built somewhat later than 1906, Neo-Classical style
- Southington Public Library, 239 Main St. Southington, Connecticut (Potter, George Wilson, Sr. (original design 1902); Crabtree, Walter P. (1930 addition), NRHP-listed
- Bristol Trust Company (1907), Riverside Ave. and Main St., Bristol, Connecticut, centerpiece of the Main Street Historic District, (Crabtree, Walter), NRHP-listed
- Fairfield State Hospital, a campus-like institutional facility, designed in a modified colonial style, built of red brick, starting in 1931. (Crabtree, Walter P., Sr.)
