= What Comes Next (disambiguation) =

What Comes Next is a 2012 psychological thriller book by John Katzenbach.

What Comes Next may also refer to:

- What Comes Next (album), by Cosmo's Midnight, 2018
- "What Comes Next", a song from the 2015 musical Hamilton
- "What Comes Next", a 1990 song by Yo La Tengo from the album Fakebook

== See also ==
- "Death and What Comes Next", a 2002 fantasy short story by Terry Pratchett based in the Discworld
- What Happens Next (disambiguation)
