= Temple B'Nai Israel (New Britain, Connecticut) =

Historic former synagogue in New Britain, Connecticut, US

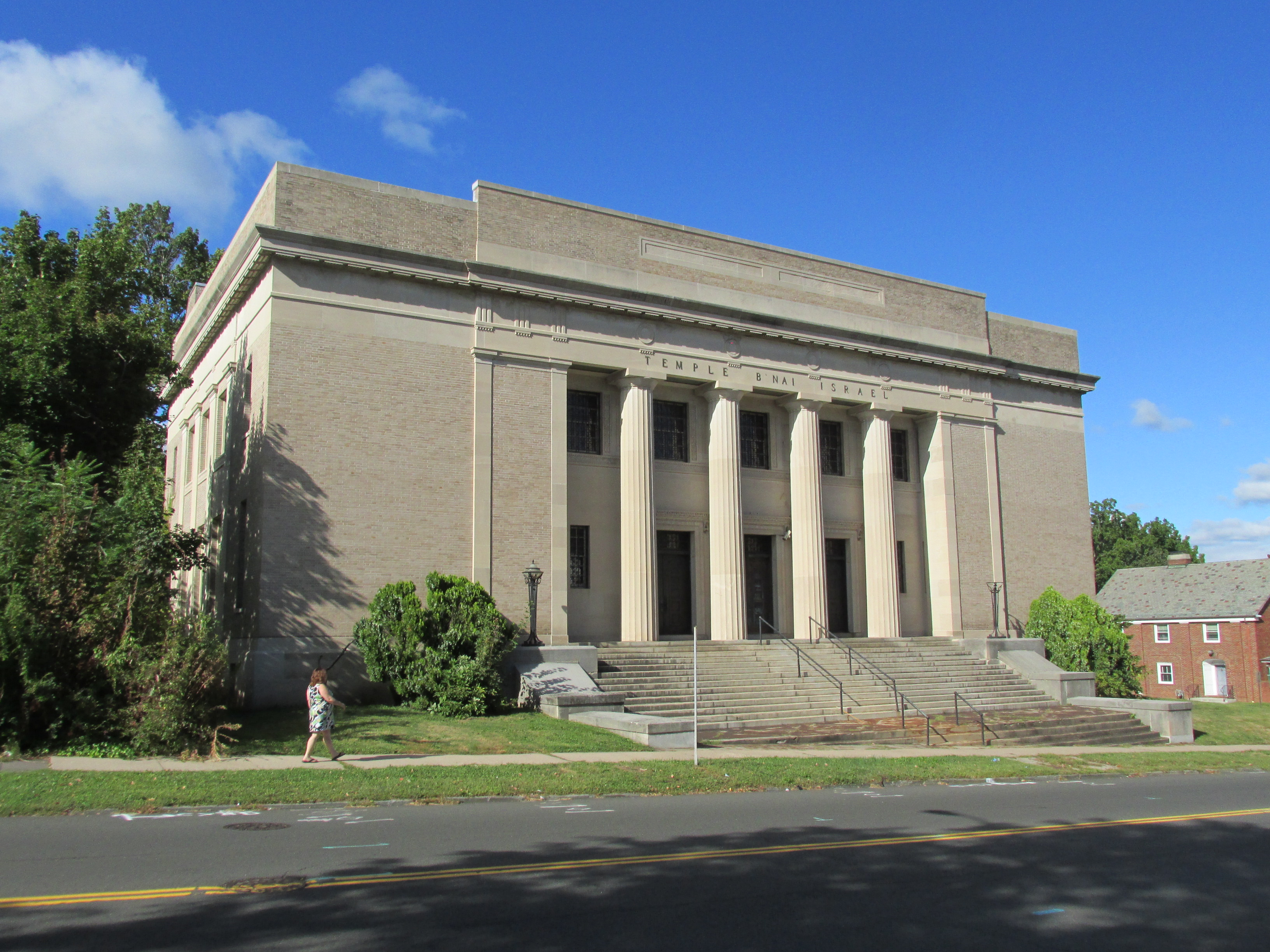
- The former synagogue and Masonic temple, in 2013

- Location of the former synagogue in Connecticut

Religion
- Affiliation: Orthodox Judaism (former); Conservative Judaism (former); Christianity (current)
- Ecclesiastical or organizational status: Masonic hall (1929–1940); Synagogue (1940–2007); Church (since c. 2020)
- Status: Closed (as a synagogue); Repurposed (as a church)

Location
- Location: 265 West Main Street, New Britain, Connecticut 06052
- Country: United States
- Interactive map of Temple B'Nai Israel
- Coordinates: 41°39′57″N 72°47′27″W

Architecture
- Architect: Walter P. Crabtree
- Type: Masonic Hall
- Style: Neoclassical; Beaux-Arts
- Established: 1889 (as a congregation)
- Completed: 1929 (Masonic hall); 1940 (Synagogue)
- Masonic Temple
- U.S. National Register of Historic Places
- Area: 5 acres (2.0 ha)
- MPS: Historic Synagogues of Connecticut MPS
- NRHP reference No.: 95000864
- Added to NRHP: July 21, 1995

Temple B'Nai Israel is an historic former Jewish synagogue and former Masonic hall, located at 265 West Main Street in New Britain, Connecticut, in the United States.

The Beaux-Arts building was originally constructed as a Masonic hall in 1929 and converted to a synagogue in 1940. The building was added to the National Register of Historic Places in 1995, under the name "Masonic Temple", as part of a multiple property listing of fifteen historic synagogues in Connecticut.

The building has been used as a church since 2020.

== History and architecture ==
The building is considered architecturally significant as a "fine example" of Neo-Classical Revival style in the Beaux-Arts mode. The building was originally designed by architect Walter P. Crabtree for use as a Masonic hall in 1927. The building was completed in 1929, just before the Great Depression. Financial constraints led the Masons to sell the building to the Aheyu B'Nai Israel in 1940. Some modifications were made to convert it for use as a synagogue, but since both organizations had similar needs (including both office and meeting rooms and a large assembly space), the building readily accommodated the new function. The conversion is considered an example of "an unusual change of use that was carried out successfully".

Crabtree also designed the Francis H. Holmes House in New Britain and the Universalist Church of West Hartford, both also listed on the National Register.

The building is also considered historically significant for its association with New Britain's Jewish community. The congregation of Temple B'Nai Israel was originally an Orthodox congregation, organized in 1889 as Aheyu B'Nai Israel (Brethren Sons of Israel). In 1924 the congregation reorganized as Conservative (under the United Synagogue of America). Members of the congregation who held to Orthodox views split off, and built Tephereth Israel Synagogue.

The synagogue closed in the summer of 2007. Its Torah scrolls, valued at tens of thousands of dollars each, were transferred to the Hillel organizations at Trinity College, the University of Hartford, and the University of Connecticut.

Whilst still in use by the congregation, the B'Nai Israel synagogue building was one of fifteen Connecticut synagogues added to the National Register of Historic Places in 1995 and 1996 in response to an unprecedented multiple submission, nominating nineteen synagogues.

As of April 2020, the building was used by New Hope at Calvary Church. As of January 2024, the Assemblies of God Fortress City Church was worshipping in the historic building.

== See also ==
- National Register of Historic Places listings in Hartford County, Connecticut
