= Just Cause (film) =

1995 film by Arne Glimcher

- Theatrical release poster
- Directed by: Arne Glimcher
- Written by: Jeb Stuart; Peter Stone
- Based on: Just Cause by John Katzenbach
- Produced by: Arne Glimcher; Steve Perry; Lee Rich
- Starring: Sean Connery; Laurence Fishburne; Kate Capshaw; Blair Underwood; Ruby Dee; Ed Harris
- Cinematography: Lajos Koltai
- Edited by: William M. Anderson; Armen Minasian
- Music by: James Newton Howard
- Production companies: Lee Rich Productions; Fountainbridge Films
- Distributed by: Warner Bros.
- Release date: February 17, 1995
- Running time: 102 minutes
- Country: United States
- Language: English
- Budget: $27 million
- Box office: $63 million

Just Cause is a 1995 American crime thriller film directed by Arne Glimcher and starring Sean Connery and Laurence Fishburne. It is based on John Katzenbach's novel of the same name.

== Plot ==
Paul Armstrong, a liberal Harvard professor and former lawyer opposed to capital punishment, is persuaded by an elderly woman to go to Florida to investigate the conviction of her grandson Bobby Earl Ferguson for murder. Ferguson, a former Cornell University student, was convicted of raping and brutally murdering a young white girl named Joanie Shriver eight years prior. Ferguson tells Armstrong that he was physically and psychologically tortured by two police detectives to get a forced confession, but firmly states he is innocent. Armstrong, believing in his innocence, must save him from being executed in the electric chair. As Armstrong digs deeper into the case, he discovers that Tanny Brown, the chief detective on the case, did indeed coerce Ferguson's confession.

Ferguson tells the professor that the murder was actually committed by Blair Sullivan, a serial killer awaiting execution. According to Ferguson, Sullivan constantly taunts him about his conviction for the crime. Sullivan, through the use of cryptic Biblical clues, provides a lead on the location of the knife used to kill the girl. Armstrong and Brown investigate, and find the weapon concealed in an old culvert. Brown tries to threaten Armstrong into abandoning the investigation, and Armstrong in turn discovers why Brown is so passionate about the Ferguson case: the murdered girl was best friends with Brown's daughter. With a new testimony and with the murder weapon in hand, Ferguson gets a re-trial and is acquitted and thereafter freed from prison. Subsequently, the governor authorizes Sullivan's execution.

Armstrong receives a call from Sullivan, who says he has a final clue to share, but first wants Armstrong to visit Sullivan's parents and tell them he said goodbye. Arriving at the house, Armstrong sees various religious items before finding their butchered, decaying bodies. Back at the prison, Sullivan gloats that he and Ferguson struck a deal: Ferguson would kill Sullivan's parents in exchange for freedom, while Sullivan would claim responsibility for the girl's murder, which Ferguson did in fact commit. Armstrong asks why he was needed for their scheme, and Sullivan replies that was "Bobby Earl's call", meaning that Armstrong would be much more believable in establishing the verdicts than either Ferguson or Sullivan. Armstrong, in his anger at being manipulated, lies to Sullivan and tells him his parents were alive and that they "forgive him", enraging Sullivan. Shortly thereafter, he is forcibly taken to the electric chair, where he is executed.

Armstrong suspects that Ferguson is aiming to kidnap his wife and daughter, and pursues him with Brown in tow. They learn Ferguson's motive is a desire for revenge on Armstrong's wife Laurie; she was the prosecutor against him in a previous kidnapping case where the arresting officer was the woman's ex-boyfriend which, while ultimately dropped due to lack of evidence, resulted in his being brutalized and castrated in jail when she had him remanded to make a name for herself, as well as the loss of his Cornell scholarship and educational prospects. Out in the swamps, Armstrong finds his wife and daughter in a small shack, where Ferguson appears after ambushing Brown and taking his gun. Ferguson claims to have killed Brown, and states his intent to avenge himself on Armstrong's wife and daughter, and then disappear. Brown suddenly appears behind Ferguson and helps Armstrong overpower him. Armstrong stabs Ferguson to death with Ferguson's own knife, and his body is eaten by alligators. Having come to an understanding with Brown, Armstrong is reunited with his family.

== Cast ==
- Sean Connery as Paul Armstrong
- Laurence Fishburne as Detective Tanny Brown
- Kate Capshaw as Laurie Prentiss Armstrong
- Blair Underwood as Bobby Earl Ferguson
- Ed Harris as Blair Sullivan
- Christopher Murray as Detective J.T. Wilcox
- Ruby Dee as Evangeline Ferguson
- Scarlett Johansson as Katie Armstrong
- Daniel J. Travanti as The Warden
- Ned Beatty as McNair
- Kevin McCarthy as Phil Prentiss
- Hope Lange as Libby Prentiss
- Chris Sarandon as Lyle Morgan
- Liz Torres as Delores Rodriguez
- George Plimpton as Elder Phillips
- Lynne Thigpen as Ida Conklin
- Barbara Jean Kane as Joanie Shriver
- Taral Hicks as Lena Brown
- Maurice Jamaal Brown as Reese Brown
- Brooke Alderson as Dr. Doliveau
- Victor Slezak as Sergeant Rogers
- Colleen Fitzpatrick as Prosecutor
- Joel S. Ehrenkranz as The Judge
- Richard Liberty as The Chaplain
- Gary Landon Mills as Prisoner#2

== Production ==
Originally, Will Smith was in talks to take on the role of Bobby Earl Ferguson. Connery and director Arne Glimcher were close friends, and Glimcher took on directing duties so that they could both work on the film together. Geena Davis has implied that she turned down the role of Laurie.

Principal photography began on May 16, 1994, and took place in and around the state of Florida. Locations include Bonita Springs, Fort Denaud, Fort Myers, Gainesville, Miami Beach, as well as around Lee and Collier counties. Filming also included Harvard Square in Cambridge, Massachusetts. Production wrapped on August 2, 1994, and also marked the final theatrical film for Hope Lange.

== Release ==
Just Cause was released on February 17, 1995, in 2,052 theatres. It opened at number 2 at the US box office grossing $10.6 million in its opening weekend. It remained at number 2 for its second week, grossing $6.6 million. The film went on to gross $36.8 million in the United States and Canada and $63 million worldwide.

== Reception ==
Unlike Glimcher's previous film, The Mambo Kings, Just Cause received mostly negative reviews, with a "Rotten" 26% rating on Rotten Tomatoes based on 31 reviews. The site's consensus states; "Just Cause you round up a phenomenal cast, that doesn't mean you have everything you need for a solid legal thriller – and this film is forgettable proof."

Gene Siskel and Roger Ebert both commented that the film's first half is quite good, particularly as a character study, but in its second half, it becomes buried in gratuitous plot twists before ending in a ludicrous showdown. However, Siskel ultimately recommended the film, while Ebert did not. Janet Maslin praised the performances of Laurence Fishburne and Ed Harris, but found the entire film is colored by director Arne Glimcher's inappropriately polished and antiseptic visual style. She summarized it as "a crime story so gritless that even the forensic photos of a stabbing victim look good." Lisa Schwarzbaum likewise praised Fishburne's performance and blamed the film's artistic failure on the direction, saying Glimcher consistently drained the story of its thrills with heavy-handedness. She gave the film a C−. Audiences polled by CinemaScore gave the film an average grade of "B+" on an A+ to F scale.

== Television adaptation ==
In late November 2022, it was reported by Deadline Hollywood and other media outlets that Scarlett Johansson, who played Katie Armstrong in the film, had signed to star and executive produce an Amazon Prime Video limited series based on Just Cause from writer Christy Hall with a gender-flipped version of Matt Cowart known as Madison "Madi" Cowart as the main protagonist.
