= Madeleine Blais =

American journalist (born 1947)

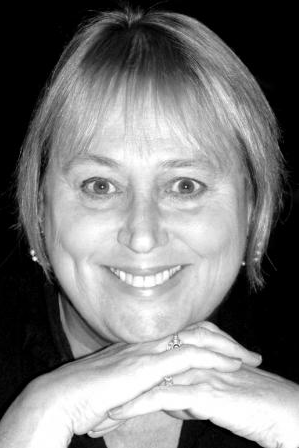
- Born: 1947 (age 77–78)
- Education: College of New Rochelle
- Occupation(s): Journalist, professor
- Spouse: John Katzenbach
- Awards: Pulitzer Prize for Feature Writing (1980)

Madeleine Blais (born 1947) is an American journalist, author and professor in the University of Massachusetts Amherst's journalism department. As a reporter for the Miami Herald, Blais earned the Pulitzer Prize for Feature Writing in 1980 for "Zepp's Last Stand", a story about a self-declared pacifist and subsequently dishonorably discharged World War I veteran. Blais has worked at The Boston Globe (1971–1972), The Trenton Times (1974–1976) and the Miami Herald (1979–1987). She has also published articles in The Washington Post, the Chicago Tribune, the Northeast Magazine in the Hartford Courant, The Philadelphia Inquirer, Newsday, Nieman Reports, the Detroit Free Press and the San Jose Mercury News. She is from Amherst, Massachusetts.

== Personal life ==
She graduated from the College of New Rochelle in 1969. While there, she roomed with Mercedes Ruehl and Suzanne Hampton. She is married to author John Katzenbach.

== Works ==
- The Heart Is an Instrument: Portraits in Journalism. University of Massachusetts Press. 1992. ISBN 978-0-87023-942-7.
- In These Girls, Hope Is a Muscle, Atlantic Monthly Press, 1995, ISBN 978-0-87113-572-8
- Uphill Walkers: Portrait of a Family. Grove Press. 2002. ISBN 978-0-8021-3892-7.
- David Garlock, ed. (2003). "Zepp's Last Stand". Pulitzer Prize feature stories: Americas best writing, 1979–2003. Wiley-Blackwell. ISBN 978-0-8138-2545-8.
- Ellen Sussman, ed. (2007). "The Beard". Bad girls: 26 writers misbehave. W. W. Norton. ISBN 978-0-393-06463-6.
- To the New Owners. Atlantic Monthly Press. 2017. ISBN 978-0802127877.
