= Ernest R. Burwell House =

Historic house in Connecticut, United States

- U.S. National Register of Historic Places
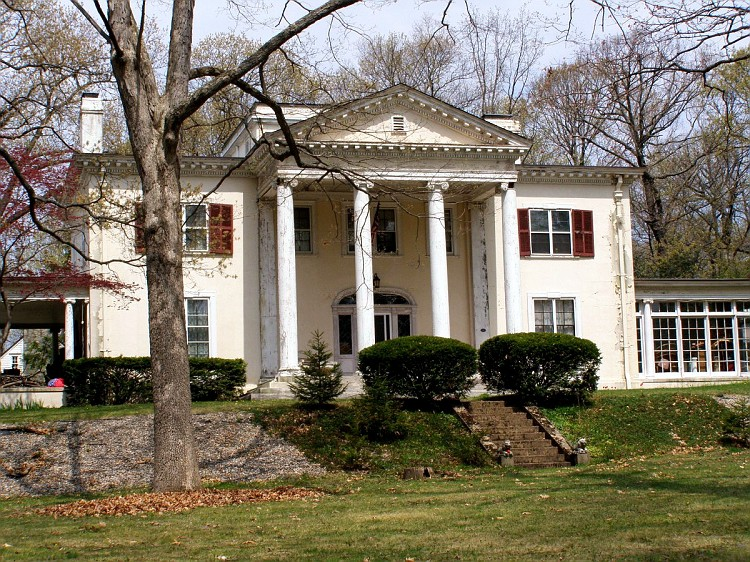

- Location within Connecticut Location within the United States
- Location: 161 Grove Street, Bristol, Connecticut
- Coordinates: 41°40′55″N 72°56′9″W
- Area: 1 acre (0.40 ha)
- Built: 1918
- Built by: Central Building Co.
- Architect: Walter P. Crabtree
- Architectural style: Classical Revival
- NRHP reference No.: 92001009
- Added to NRHP: August 18, 1992

The Ernest R. Burwell House is a historic house at 161 Grove Street in Bristol, Connecticut. Built in 1918, it is an outstanding example of a Classical Revival residence. It was listed on the National Register of Historic Places in 1992.

== Description and history ==
The Ernest R. Burwell House is located on the east side of Bristol's fashionable Federal Hill residential area, at the northeast corner of Grove and Oakland Streets. Although it faces Grove Street, it is set well back, with a tree-dotted lawn and semi-circular drive in between. It is a two-story masonry structure, its exterior finished in stucco. It is covered by a low-pitch hip roof, at whose center is an elevated monitor section. The roof was originally encircled by a low balustrade, which has been removed; a similar balustrade still adorns the garage. The main facade is three bays wide, the central one sheltered by a massive two-story four-column temple portico, with Doric columns rising to an entablature and fully pedimented and dentillated gable. An open porch is set to the left, and a solarium enclosed in glass is to the right. The interior is lavishly finished, with parquet floors in the foyer, a grand curving staircase, and mahogany paneling and bookcases in the library.

The house was built in 1918 to a design by New Britain architect Walter Crabtree. Ernest Burwell, for whom it was built, was a native of New Hartford, who made a fortune in coal, ice, and trucking, and eventually became president of the Bristol Manufacturing Company, a textile maker. Crabtree's design is one of his more ambitious residential designs; although he also designed the now-demolished DeWitt Page Mansion which stood next door, his best-known works in the region are commercial designs.

== See also ==
- National Register of Historic Places listings in Hartford County, Connecticut
