= Marc Glimcher =

American art dealer (born 1963)

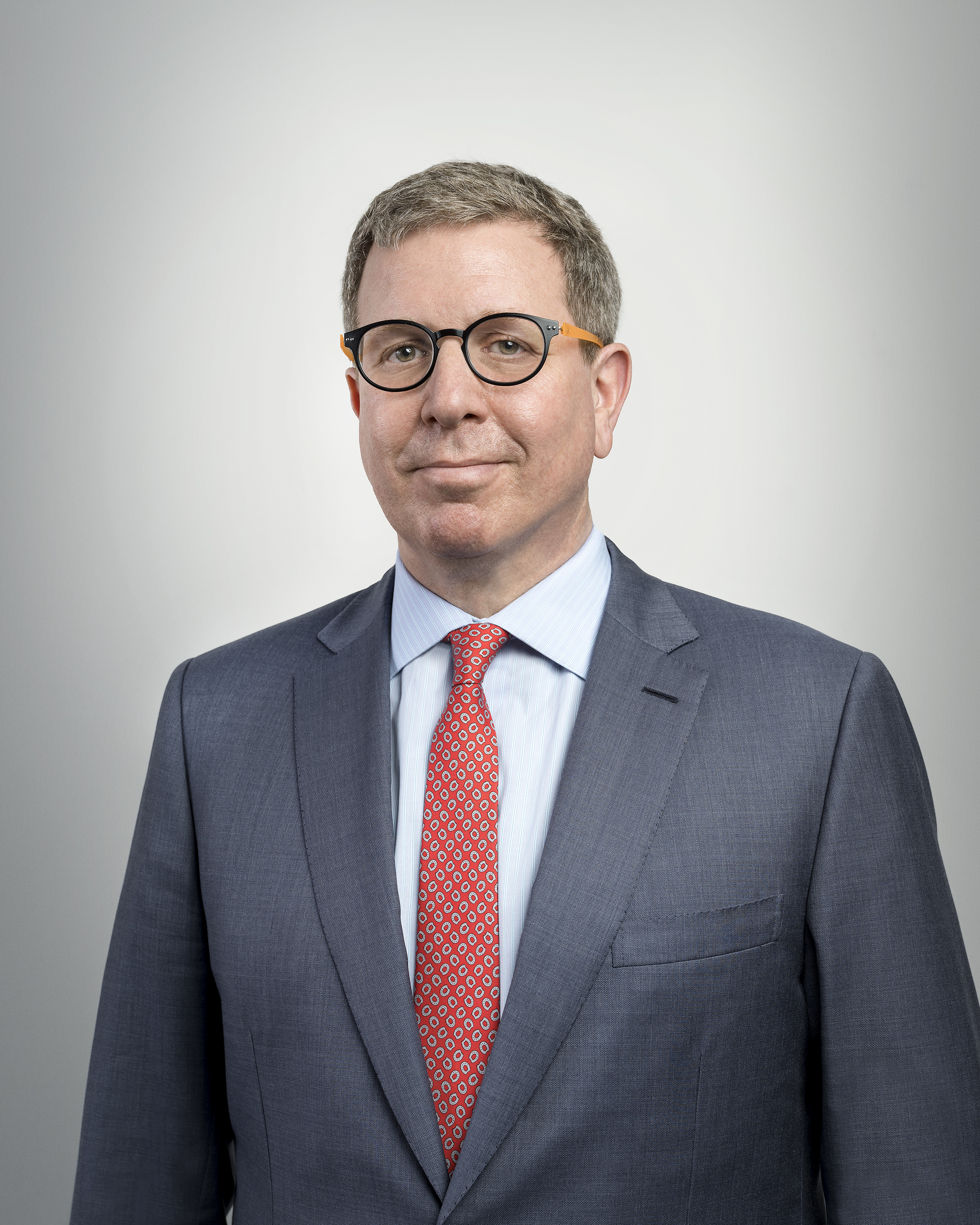
- Born: September 16, 1963 (age 63); New York City
- Education: Johns Hopkins University; Harvard University
- Occupations: Pace Gallery (President & CEO)
- Known for: "Power 100" (Top 25 Most Powerful People in the International Art World) by ArtReview
- Spouse(s): Dr. Natalie Geary (divorced); Andrea (divorced); Fairfax Dorn (separated)
- Children: Isabelle, Lilleth, Katharine, Alexander, Gage
- Parents: Arne Glimcher (father); Mildred Glimcher (mother)
- Relatives: Paul Glimcher (brother)

Marc Glimcher (born September 16, 1963) is an American art dealer who is the president and CEO of Pace Gallery, a modern and contemporary art gallery founded by his father, Arne Glimcher, in Boston in 1960. He and his father were cited among the top 100 most powerful people in the international art world, according to the annual "Power 100" list published by ArtReview. In 2012, Glimcher sold a Gerhard Richter painting for more than $20 million at Art Basel in Basel, Switzerland.

== Education ==
Glimcher was born in New York City. He is the second son (his brother is neuroscientist Paul W. Glimcher) of Mildred “Milly” and Arnold “Arne” Glimcher, an art historian and art dealer respectively, who together founded Pace Gallery in Boston in 1960. He graduated from Harvard University in 1985 with a degree in biological anthropology, and from 1989 to 1991 studied biochemistry and immunology at Johns Hopkins University.

Glimcher subsequently worked as science teacher in Santa Fe, moving there with his first wife Natalie Geary and their two daughters. After several years in New Mexico, they moved to Malawi to assist in combating the AIDS epidemic.

== Art world career ==
Glimcher joined Pace Gallery in 1985 as Associate Director, left in 1989, returned in 1991, and was named president and CEO in 2011. In his more than 30 years with the gallery, Glimcher has expanded Pace's roster of artists to include established artists such as Michal Rovner and Julian Schnabel, and as well as newer artists such as Loie Hollowell. Glimcher has also broadened Pace's representation of artist estates, including the Robert Rauschenberg Foundation and Vito Acconci Studio.

Glimcher oversees the gallery's global activities from its headquarters in New York City, including international expansion to Beijing, London, Palo Alto, Seoul, Geneva, and Hong Kong. In 2008, Glimcher founded Artifex Press, the first digital, online catalogue raisonné publishing company.

He has also curated thematic exhibitions including Jean Dubuffet: A Retrospective; Je Suis le Cahier, The Sketchbooks of Picasso (1986), the only comprehensive exhibition of Picasso’s sketchbooks; Mark Rothko: The Last Paintings; Earthly Forms: The Biomorphic Sculpture of Arp, Calder, and Noguchi; Alexander Calder: From Model to Monument; and Logical Conclusions: 40 Years of Rule-Based Art, for which he authored the catalogue essay (2005).

== Personal life ==
From 1989 to 2002, Glimcher was married to Natalie Geary. From 2003 to 2013, he was married to Andrea Bundonis. In 2015 he married Fairfax Dorn, the co-founder and artistic director of Ballroom Marfa. They separated in 2024. The couple resided in New York City's Flatiron District and in Sagaponack, New York. From 2021 to 2024, Glimcher also maintained a six-bedroom waterfront home in Palm Beach, Florida. Glimcher has five children: Isabelle, Lilleth, Katharine, Alexander, and Gage.
