= Bonetti/Kozerski Architecture =

American architecture and design firm

Bonetti/Kozerski Architecture is an American architecture and design firm based in New York City. The firm, noted for its minimalist style, was founded in 2000 by Italian-born Enrico Bonetti and British-born Dominic Kozerski, both architects. The firm's first major client was American fashion designer Donna Karan, with whom the company has worked on numerous projects. Other clients have included hoteliers André Balazs and Ian Schrager, music producer Rick Rubin, film director Shawn Levy, and fashion designer Ralph Rucci.

The firm designed the interior of Avenues: The World School, a private K–12 school in the Chelsea neighborhood of Manhattan, which opened in September 2012. In Chelsea, the firm also designed Pace Gallery's new eight-story headquarters and multi-floor gallery, which opened in September 2019.

Bonetti/Kozerski Architecture also designed the interior of Italian shipbuilder Benetti's luxury superyacht "Oasis".
