= The Madman's Tale =

Psychological horror novel by John Katzenbach

- Author: John Katzenbach
- Publisher: Ballantine Books
- Publication date: July 1, 2004
- ISBN: 0-345-46481-8

The Madman's Tale is a psychological horror novel written by the American writer John Katzenbach. Its original English version was published and released in 2004. In 2007, its Spanish translation by Julia Quinn was published under the title La historia del loco.

The story is set in a psychiatric hospital, where the protagonist Francis Petrel has been confined by his family after his erratic behavior culminated in a terrifying outburst. The narrative contains elements of supernatural horror and psychological thriller, notable for its atmosphere of anguish and tension.

This novel won the Hammett Prize in 2004 and was nominated for the Anthony Award in 2005.

== Plot ==
Francis Petrel, nicknamed C-bird, was just over twenty years old when his family confined him to the Western State Hospital psychiatric facility after his erratic behavior culminated in a terrifying outburst. Upon entering the hospital, Francis exposes the feelings that surround those living with mental health issues. The book describes a scene of abandonment, sadness, rejection, and indifference from Francis' family and the society he lives in, leaving the character in an unfamiliar place.

Recently released from the Western State Hospital, Francis faces his own inner demons as he recounts his memories of the murderer of a young nurse, whose mutilated body was found one night after the lights went out. The story tells itself in two parallel parts. One of the stories is during his time in the asylum, all a memory slowly bringing itself back to life. The other story takes place after he is released, and he feels compelled to author a book on the events surrounding that murder.

He has no paper, so he writes his story on the wall and is constantly challenged with tedious interruptions. At the same time, he forgoes his medication, and the tension of continuing with his work becomes threatened by his struggle with his own madness. The voices in his head urge him to keep writing and narrate what happened in that murder. Although the police suspected a patient, the inmates always spoke of "The Angel" and the crime remained unsolved. Only now, with the reappearance of the murderer, will the answer be known.

The book is divided into three parts: "The Unreliable Narrator," "A World of Stories," and "White Latex Paint." All narrated by Francis, who with a diagnosis of schizophrenia becomes the unreliable narrator accompanied by his friend Peter, nicknamed the firefighter, and the prosecutor Lucy Jones as they try to get to the bottom of the murder. Together, they spend days in the hospital investigating the crime and trying to reach the culprit, always navigating the typical behaviors of a psychiatric hospital.

== Reception & awards ==
Washington Post reviewer Patrick Anderson wrote that the novel could be "sometimes over the top" however was "a tour de force, superior storytelling designed to scare your pants off and likely to succeed".

In 2004, the novel won the Hammett Prize, an award given by the Association of Crime Writers since 1987 to annually distinguish the best crime novel written.

In 2005, it was nominated for Best Novel for the Anthony Award, a literary award for mystery writers that has been given since 1986.

== Film adaptation ==
The motion picture adaptation of The Madman's Tale was to be filmed between October 26, 2007 and January 8, 2008 at Fairfield Hills Hospital in Newtown, Connecticut. Nonetheless, due to personal issues of the lead actor Jonathan Rhys Meyers, production was stopped before filming began.
