= Hart's War =

2002 American war drama film

- Theatrical release poster
- Directed by: Gregory Hoblit
- Screenplay by: Billy Ray; Terry George
- Based on: Hart's War by John Katzenbach
- Produced by: David Ladd; David Foster; Arnold Rifkin; Gregory Hoblit
- Starring: Bruce Willis; Colin Farrell; Terrence Howard; Cole Hauser; Marcel Iureş; Linus Roache
- Cinematography: Alar Kivilo
- Edited by: David Rosenbloom
- Music by: Rachel Portman
- Production companies: Metro-Goldwyn-Mayer Pictures; Cheyenne Enterprises; Ladd Films; David Foster Productions
- Distributed by: MGM Distribution Co.
- Release date: February 15, 2002
- Running time: 125 minutes
- Country: United States
- Languages: English; German
- Budget: $70 million
- Box office: $33.1 million

Hart's War is a 2002 American war drama film about a World War II prisoner of war (POW) camp based on the novel by John Katzenbach. It stars Bruce Willis as Col. William McNamara and Colin Farrell as Lt. Thomas Hart. The film co-stars Terrence Howard, Cole Hauser, and Marcel Iures. Directed by Gregory Hoblit, the film was shot at Barrandov Studios in Prague, and released on February 15, 2002. The film received mixed reviews and grossed $33.1 million against its $70 million budget.

== Plot ==
In late 1944 during the Battle of the Bulge in World War II, U.S. Army intelligence officer First Lieutenant Thomas Hart (Farrell) is captured by German forces. While interrogating Hart, the Germans coerce him to divulge intelligence by taking away his boots, causing his feet to become frostbitten and badly injured, and leaving him, naked, in a very cold cell. He is then transferred by train to Stalag VI-A prisoner of war camp at Hemer, Germany. While en route, a P-51 Mustang attacks (the letters POW were painted on the top of the train, but got covered by thick snow). To save themselves, the POWs leave the train and spell P-O-W with their bodies and prevent further strafing.

After arriving at the new POW camp, Lt. Hart is interviewed by the ranking American officer, Colonel William McNamara (Willis). When McNamara asks if he cooperated with the Germans after he was captured, Hart denies it. McNamara knows this to be a lie when Hart says he only endured three days of interrogation. McNamara does not reveal this to Hart, but sends him to bunk in a barracks for enlisted men, rather than allow him to bunk with the other officers.

Two Black pilots are brought to the camp and assigned to Hart's barracks. They are the only African Americans in the camp, and their situation is compounded by their status as officers. Staff Sgt. Vic W. Bedford (Hauser), a racist, is their primary antagonist. One of the pilots, Lt. Lamar Archer, is executed when accused of keeping a weapon that Bedford had planted in his bunk. When Bedford himself subsequently turns up dead, the surviving pilot, Lt. Lincoln A. Scott (Howard) is accused of killing Bedford in retaliation. A law student before the war, Hart is appointed by McNamara to defend the accused pilot at his court-martial, a trial to which the amused camp commandant, Oberst Werner Visser (Iureş) agrees. As the court martial proceeds, Hart struggles to prove reasonable doubt while dismissing Lt. Scott's motive, means, and opportunity. As the trial proceeds, Scott takes the stand and takes the opportunity to rail against the racism he and Archer faced in the Army, and excoriates McNamara for forcing two black pilots to bunk in the enlisted men's barracks.

As Hart's defense threatens to unintentionally call attention to subterfuge by the POWs, McNamara reveals to Hart in private that the "defense," like the trial itself, is a sham, an elaborate distraction to hide a planned attack on a nearby ammunition plant (which the U.S. Army Air Force mistakenly believes to be a shoe factory) by McNamara and his men, in aid of the war effort. It is revealed that Bedford planted the weapon in Archer's bunk, knowing the guards would kill Archer for it. In return, Bedford informed the guards of the location of a secret radio. It is also revealed Bedford planned to escape with money and clothes, likely in return for telling the Nazis about McNamara's plan. Upon realizing Bedford's plot, McNamara killed Bedford to prevent it. Hart is shocked that McNamara as a senior officer would sacrifice Scott to protect the planned attack on the ammunition plant. McNamara reminds Hart that in war, sometimes one man must be sacrificed to save the lives of many. Hart acknowledges this, but retorts that it is McNamara's duty to ensure that he should be the sacrifice, not Scott. Disgusted, McNamara says that Hart does not know anything about duty, in reference to how Hart gave in to a "Level 1" interrogator after three days, whereas McNamara was tortured for a month. Nonetheless, McNamara is shaken by Hart's words. The night before the court martial concludes, he visits Scott in his holding cell and gifts him his personal Bible.

On the last day of the court martial, McNamara and his men feign food poisoning in order to abstain from the trial. As they proceed to the ammunition plant via a hidden tunnel, McNamara overhears Hart falsely confessing to the murder of Bedford in order to save Lt. Scott's life. Oberst Visser immediately dissolves the court martial and orders the entire camp to gather outside to witness Hart's execution. Upon learning that the "sick" soldiers are missing, Visser examines the barracks and discovers the hidden tunnel. Infuriated, he orders that all prisoners involved in the court martial are to be executed immediately, starting with Hart. It is then that McNamara returns, just as explosives detonate and destroy the plant, and takes responsibility. Visser personally executes him on the spot, but spares the remaining prisoners. Three months later, the German army surrenders to the Allies. The prison camp is liberated and all of the surviving prisoners, including Hart, are sent home. Hart's final comments are that he learned about honor, duty, and sacrifice.

== Cast ==
- Bruce Willis as Colonel William McNamara
- Colin Farrell as Lieutenant Thomas Hart
- Terrence Howard as Lieutenant Lincoln Scott
- Cole Hauser as Staff Sergeant Vic Bedford
- Marcel Iureș as Oberst Werner Visser
- Linus Roache as Captain Peter Ross
- Vicellous Reon Shannon as Lieutenant Lamar Archer
- Maury Sterling as Private First Class Dennis A. Gerber
- Sam Jaeger as Captain R.G. Sisk
- Scott Michael Campbell as Corporal Joe Cromin
- Rory Cochrane as Sergeant Carl Webb
- Sebastian Tillinger as Private Bert D. "Moose" Codman
- Rick Ravanello as Major Joe Clary
- Adrian Grenier as Private Daniel E. Abrams
- Sam Worthington as Corporal B.J. "Depot" Guidry
- Jonathan Brandis as Private Lewis P. Wakely
- Holger Handtke as Major Johann Writz

== Production ==
MGM purchased the film rights to the novel a year before it was published. Producer David Foster bought the rights after viewing the manuscript, seeing it was seven chapters long and had a memo saying where it was going. The film title was originally called Grant's War, which they felt was too Civil War-esque for a film set during World War II. Jeb Stuart was hired to adapt the novel. Alfonso Cuarón was hired to direct, and Terry George provided rewrites to the screenplay. The studio planned to begin shooting in April 2000, but Cuarón left the film to work on Y tu mamá también. Edward Norton was initially cast as Tommy Hart.

== Release ==
MGM released the film in the United States on February 15, 2002 and was released in other countries via 20th Century Fox.

== Reception ==
=== Box office ===
Produced on a budget of $70 million, the film grossed $33.1 million worldwide.

=== Critical response ===
Hart's War received mixed reviews. The film holds a 60% approval rating on Rotten Tomatoes, based on 122 reviews, with an average rating of 5.9/10. The website's critical consensus reads: "Well-made and solidly acted, Hart's War is modestly compelling. However, the movie suffers from having too many subplots". Metacritic rated it 49/100 based on 32 reviews, indicating "mixed or average" reviews.

Audiences polled by CinemaScore gave the film an average grade of "B" on an A+ to F scale.
