= What Happens Next =

What Happens Next may refer to:

== Music ==
- What Happens Next? (band), American thrashcore band
- What Happens Next (Gang of Four album), 2015
- What Happens Next (Joe Satriani album) and its title track, 2018
- What Happens Next (What Happened Then?), a 1984 album by American hardcore punk band Ill Repute
- What Happens Next, 2021 album by Davy Knowles

== Other uses ==
- What Happens Next? (film), 2012 documentary film about Dan Mangan
- What Happens Next, a 2021 webcomic by Max Graves (see List of webcomics with LGBTQ characters#2020s)
- What Happens Next?: A History of Hollywood Screenwriting, a 2007 book by Marc Norman

== See also ==
- What Comes Next (disambiguation)
