= Hart's War (novel) =

1999 novel by John Katzenbach

- First edition cover
- Author: John Katzenbach
- Publisher: Ballantine Books
- Publication date: April 1, 1999
- ISBN: 978-0-345-42624-6

Hart's War is a 1999 novel by John Katzenbach about prisoners of war in World War II.

A movie of the same name, starring Bruce Willis, was released in 2002. The film also starred Colin Farrell playing Lieutenant Thomas Hart.
