= Fairfield Hills Hospital =

- State of Connecticut Department of Mental Health
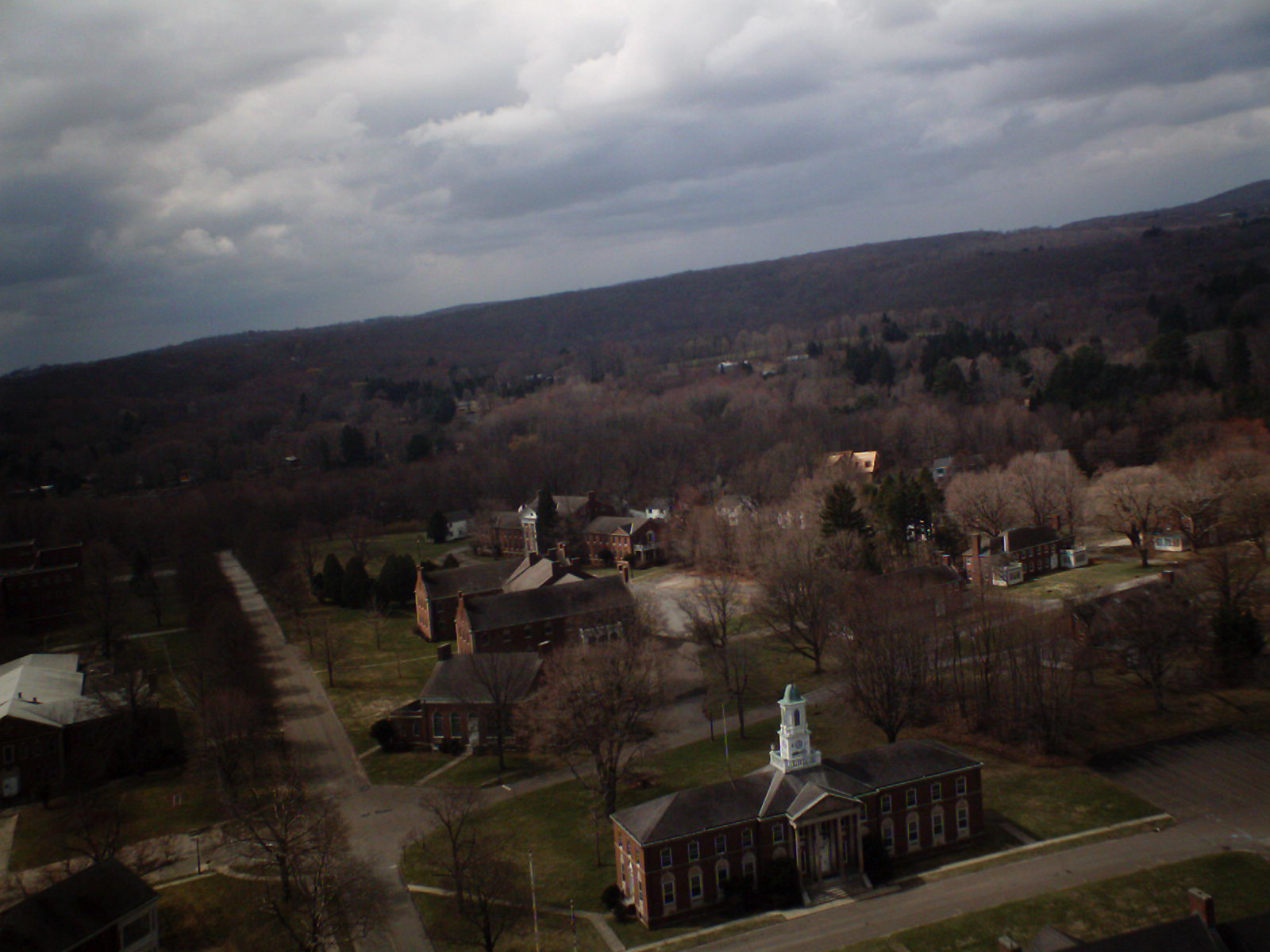
- Fairfield State Hospital from above

Geography
- Location: Newtown, Connecticut, United States
- Coordinates: 41.40°N 73.29°W

Organization
- Type: Specialist

Services
- Beds: 4,000
- Speciality: Psychiatric hospital

History
- Former name: Fairfield State Hospital
- Opened: June 1, 1931
- Closed: 1995

Links
- Lists: Hospitals in Connecticut
- Fairfield Hills Campus Historic District
- U.S. National Register of Historic Places
- U.S. Historic district
- Location within Connecticut
- Location: 1st Street, Keating Farms Avenue, Primrose Street, Trades Lane, Wasserman Way, Newtown, Connecticut
- Area: 155 acres (63 ha)
- NRHP reference No.: 100010816
- Added to NRHP: September 16, 2024

Fairfield State Hospital (as it was known from 1929 to 1963) or Fairfield Hills Hospital (as it was known after 1963) was a psychiatric hospital in Newtown, Connecticut, which operated from 1931 until 1995. At its peak, the hospital housed over 4,000 patients. The entire facility was owned and operated by the State of Connecticut Department of Mental Health. The facility still stands, just southeast of the center of Newtown; the campus was listed on the National Register of Historic Places in 2024.

== History ==
Fairfield State Hospital was created due to overcrowding at the other two state hospitals. Walter P. Crabtree Sr., designed the campus-like facility. Dedicated to a common development theme, the institutional buildings were of a modified colonial style, built of red brick and attractively accented. On June 10, 1931, the cornerstone was laid for the Fairfield State Hospital (renamed to Fairfield Hills Hospital in 1963 per P.A. 278). The campus was constructed largely fireproof throughout. Some later constructed buildings were built during the 1940s and 1950s.

The hospital contained 16 buildings on 100 acres (40 ha), plus another 670 acres (270 ha) of land around them. The acreage consisted of large farm meadows and a forest. A circular network of roads connected the buildings.

The hospital opened and received its first patients on June 1, 1933, from Connecticut Valley Hospital. There were initially fewer than 500 patients, and only 3 doctors. By the late 1960s Fairfield Hills housed more than 4,000 patients, 20 doctors, 50 nurses, and 100 assorted other employees.

On December 8, 1995 the facility was closed and patients were transferred to the Connecticut Valley Hospital in Middletown, Connecticut. The records from Fairfield Hills Hospital are located in RG 021, subgroup 7 at the Connecticut State Library & Archives in restricted files arranged into three series:

- Patients, 1933-1995 admission and discharge records;
- Personnel, 1934-1943 records of separation; and
- Medical Staff Records, 1937-1974 records of birth and deportation, autopsies, and medical examiner cases.

== Closure ==
Due to deinstitutionalization in the 1960s and 1970s, there was less of a need for hospitals like Fairfield Hills. With the high cost of running underused hospitals, state hospitals around the country shut their doors. In 1995, Gov. John Rowland closed Fairfield Hills and its sister hospital, Norwich State Hospital. All patients that remained were moved to Connecticut Valley Hospital in Middletown.

The Town of Newtown rented out the first floor of Canaan House from the mid-1990s up until 2005; it was home to the town's Board of Education, Planning & Zoning, and Fire Marshall. The Reed Intermediate School is also located on the property, as well as a youth academy and the new community center. In addition, the first commercial enterprise on the campus, NewSylum Brewing Company, opened its doors in June 2020 after extensive renovations to the former Stratford Hall Building.

== Therapy and treatment ==
During its operation, treatments at Fairfield Hills included hydrotherapy, insulin shock therapy, electroconvulsive therapy, and frontal lobotomy. In the first year that psychosurgery was performed at Fairfield Hills over 100 patients were treated.

== Tunnels ==
A majority of the staff and utility buildings, along with all of the patient buildings, were connected by a series of concrete tunnels. These tunnels were mostly used to move patients and equipment between the buildings, especially during the winter months and on bad weather days. Additionally, the tunnels were used to convey food from the central cafeteria (Bridgeport Hall) for patients confined to their residence buildings. Doctors, nurses, and other various workers also used the tunnels, and when required, even corpses were transported through them to the on-campus morgue. The tunnels provided an accessible path for a major portion of the underground water, telephone, heat and electric power grid. Due to the increasing safety concerns, illegal trespassing, and vandalism to buildings by parties attempting to gain access to the tunnels, the tunnels were sealed by the Town of Newtown in 2009. All access ways leading to the tunnels were welded and / or boarded shut. During demolition of certain buildings, to pave way for a recreation center, some tunnels were filled in to level the ground.

== Buildings ==
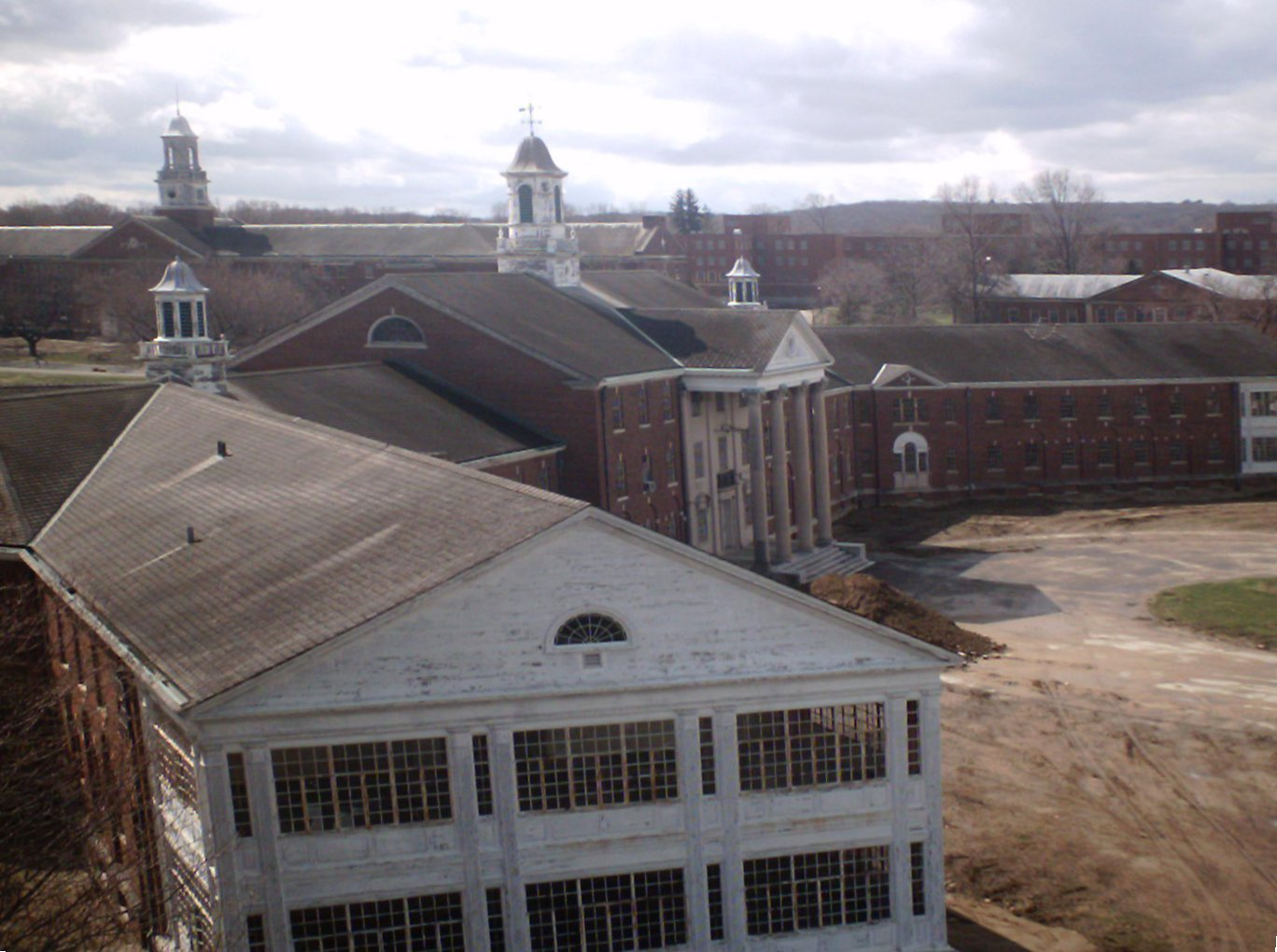
The main building in 2006

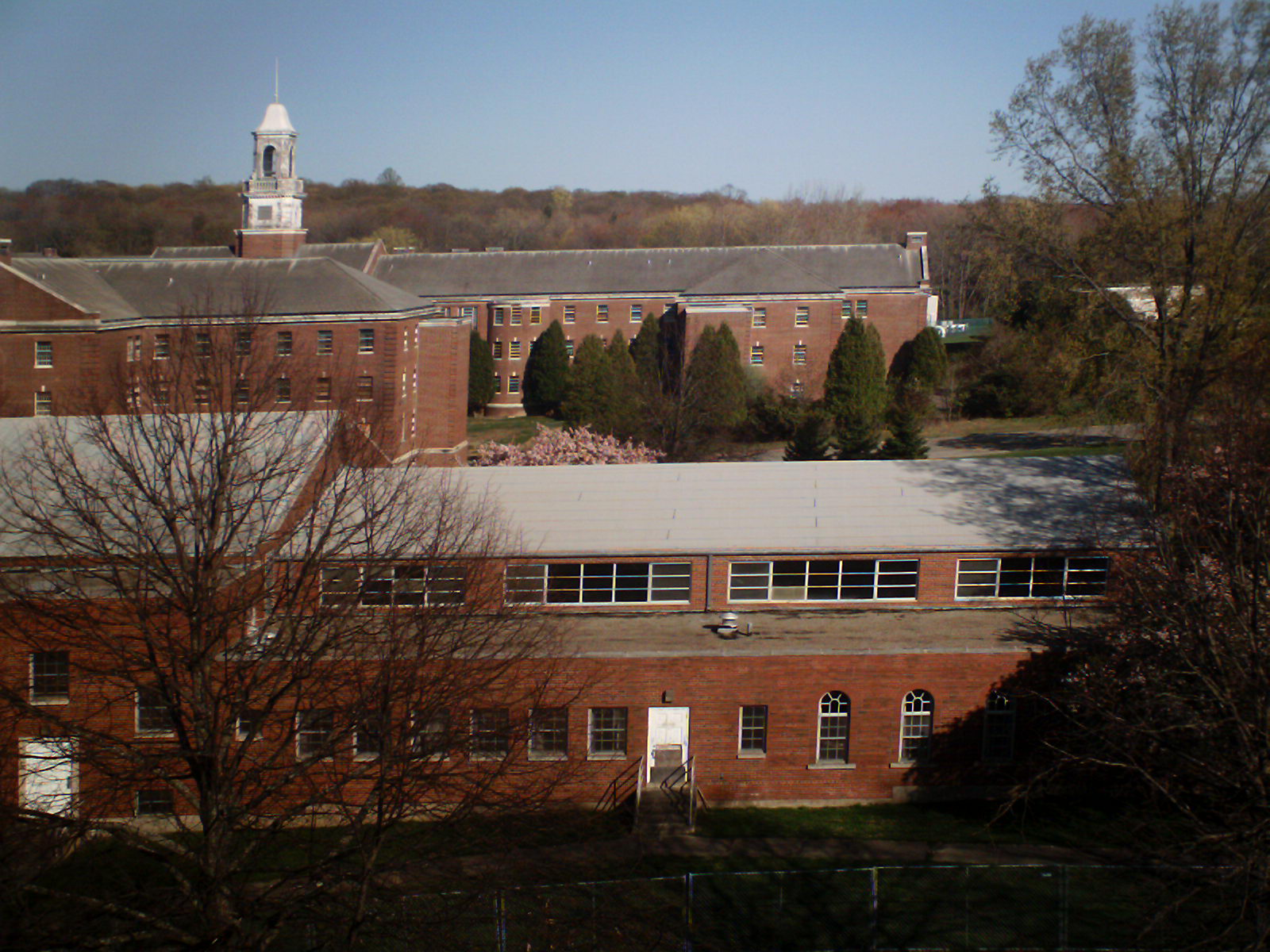
Hospital building in 2006

The following are the main campus buildings of Fairfield Hills. With the exception of Cochran House, they were named after Fairfield and Litchfield County cities and towns.

=== Administration buildings ===
- Newtown Hall – administration building: telephone switchboard
- Bridgeport Hall – central food services
- Greenwich House – offices and medical hospital
- Shelton House – administration and patient care
- Plymouth Hall – chapel, theater, gymnasium, bowling alley and workshops
- Power Plant – electricity and steam heat for buildings
- Stratford Hall – library; formerly the lunch-time cafeteria for commuting workers
- Yale Laboratory – laboratory and Morgue
- additional building(s) for the central laundry, dairy farm, bakery and incinerator

=== Employee buildings ===
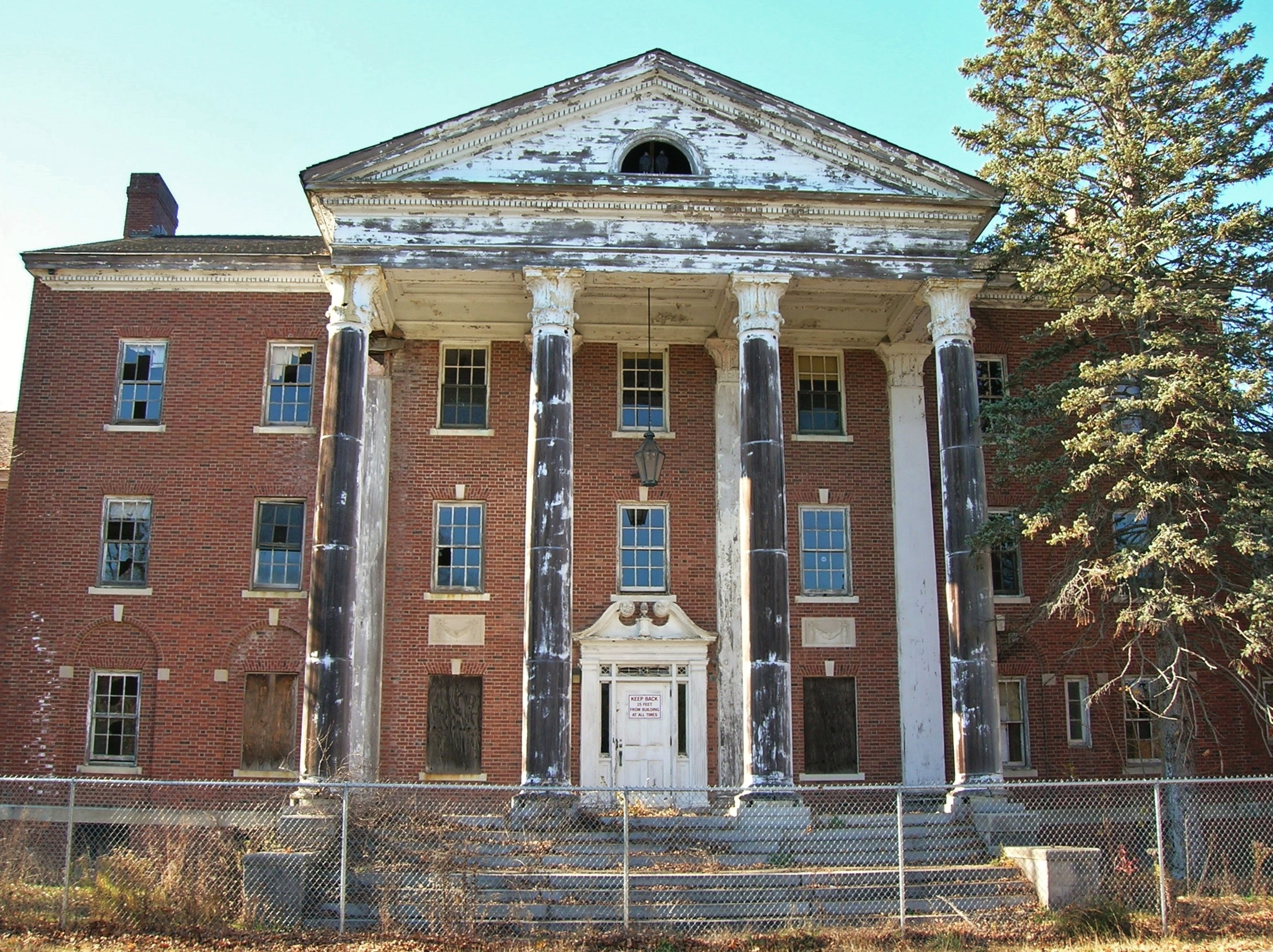
Norwalk Hall in 2014

- Danbury Hall – employee housing
- Norwalk Hall – employee dormitory
- Stamford Hall – employee dormitory
- Watertown Hall – employee apartments
- Woodbury Hall – employee dormitory
- Washington Square – doctor residences
- plus several single family homes

=== Patient treatment and housing ===
- Bridgewater House (BTU & ADAM House)
- Canaan House
- Cochran House
- Fairfield House
- Kent House
- Litchfield House

== Current status ==
The Town of Newtown acquired the former Fairfield Hills Hospital property from the State of Connecticut in 2004. The Town of Newtown established the Fairfield Hills Authority, a municipal development agency, to implement new construction on the site. This calls for reserving a major portion of the property for municipal and cultural use, as well as passive and active recreational use.

Today, most buildings on the campus are abandoned and not maintained, with warning signs to keep back from them. However, the campus does still contain walking trails and paths for the public and a new building has been built on the site called the Newtown Youth Academy. It was paid for by private funders and features an indoor turf field, basketball court, and full workout center.

The Town of Newtown selected Bridgeport Hall as the location for its new municipal offices. It was dedicated on November 21, 2009, and is now called the Newtown Municipal Center.

The Newtown Volunteer Ambulance Corps. has built a new $4.5 Million Ambulance facility on the Campus. It opened on October 11, 2014.

== In popular culture ==
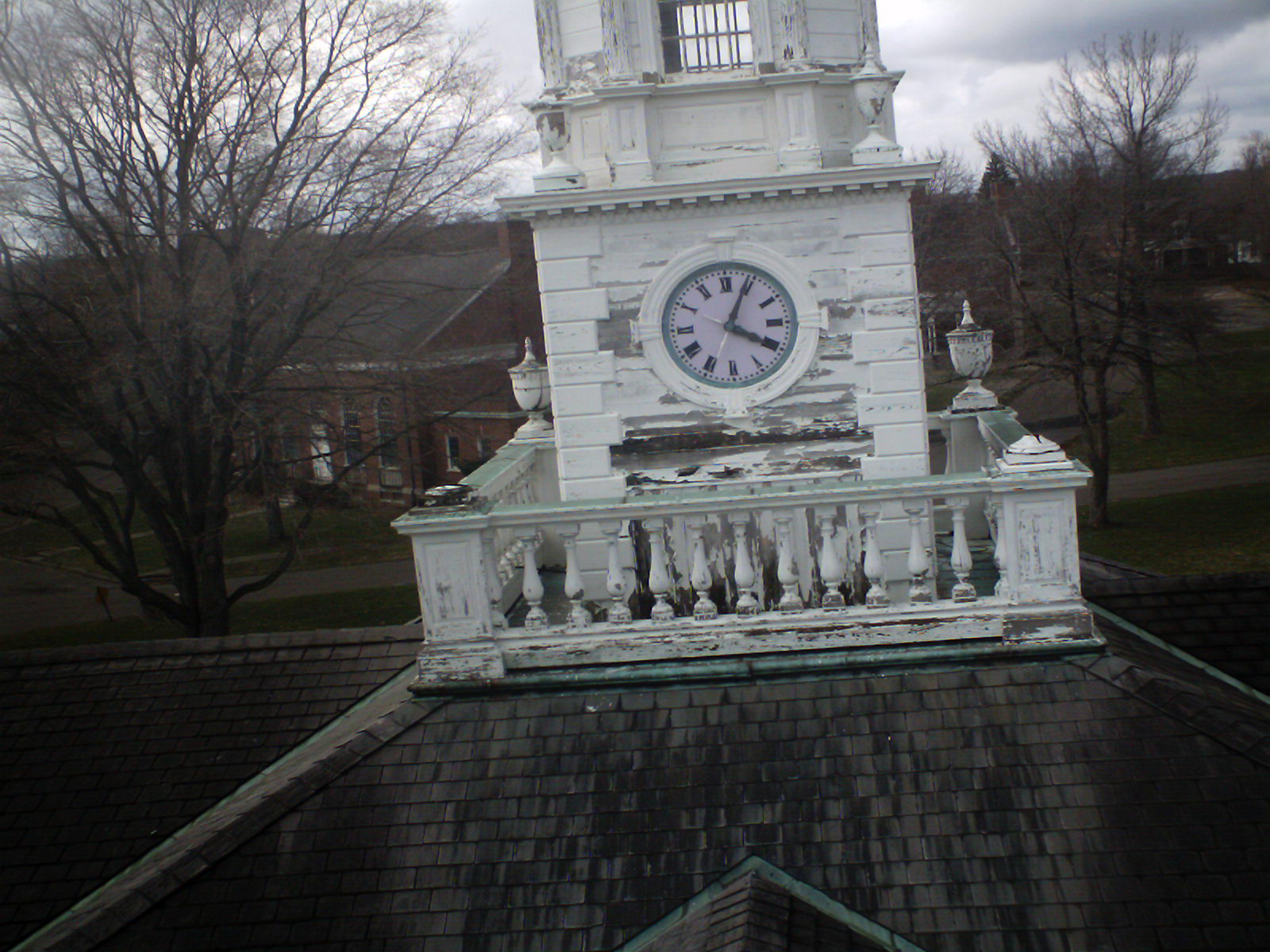

- Sleepers (1996) Fairfield Hills was the filming location for the Wilkinson Home for Boys.
- Fairfield State Hospital was featured in an episode of MTV's Fear in 2000. In order to deter any potential trespassing from fans, the hospital was renamed "St Agnes Hospital" by the show's creators.
- A motion picture adaptation of The Madman's Tale was to be filmed on the property between October 26, 2007 and January 8, 2008, however, due to the "family and legal troubles" of lead actor Jonathan Rhys Meyers, production was stopped before filming began.
