= Pace Gallery =

Art gallery

- Established: 1960; 66 years ago
- Location: Multiple
- Type: Art gallery
- Founder: Arne Glimcher
- President: Samanthe Rubell
- Website: thepacegallery.com

The Pace Gallery is a contemporary and modern art gallery with 9 locations worldwide. It was founded in Boston by Arne Glimcher in 1960. His son, Marc Glimcher, is now president and CEO. Pace Gallery operates in New York, London, Hong Kong, Los Angeles, Geneva, Seoul, East Hampton, Tokyo, and Palm Beach.

The gallery is named after Glimcher's father's nickname, "Pacey". It moved to Manhattan in 1963.

== Main business ==
In 1960, at the age of 22, Arnold (Arne) Glimcher founded The Pace Gallery in Boston, running it with his wife, Milly, and his mother, Eva. In 1963, Glimcher partnered with Fred Mueller to bring the gallery to New York, where it opened a location on East 57th Street with the help of Ivan Karp, a close friend of Glimcher's. In 1965, Glimcher closed the Boston gallery and permanently moved his family to New York. Three years later, the gallery moved to its long-time location at 32 East 57th Street.

After the Pace Gallery closed its Boston location in 1963, Eva Glimcher maintained a branch of the Pace Gallery in Columbus, Ohio, located downtown on Broad Street, from 1965 to 1982. After her death, the branch closed.

In the 1960s, Glimcher and Irving Blum briefly operated a Pace outpost on La Cienega Boulevard in Los Angeles.

From 1995 to 1999, PaceWildenstein operated a gallery in Beverly Hills, designed by architect Charles Gwathmey.

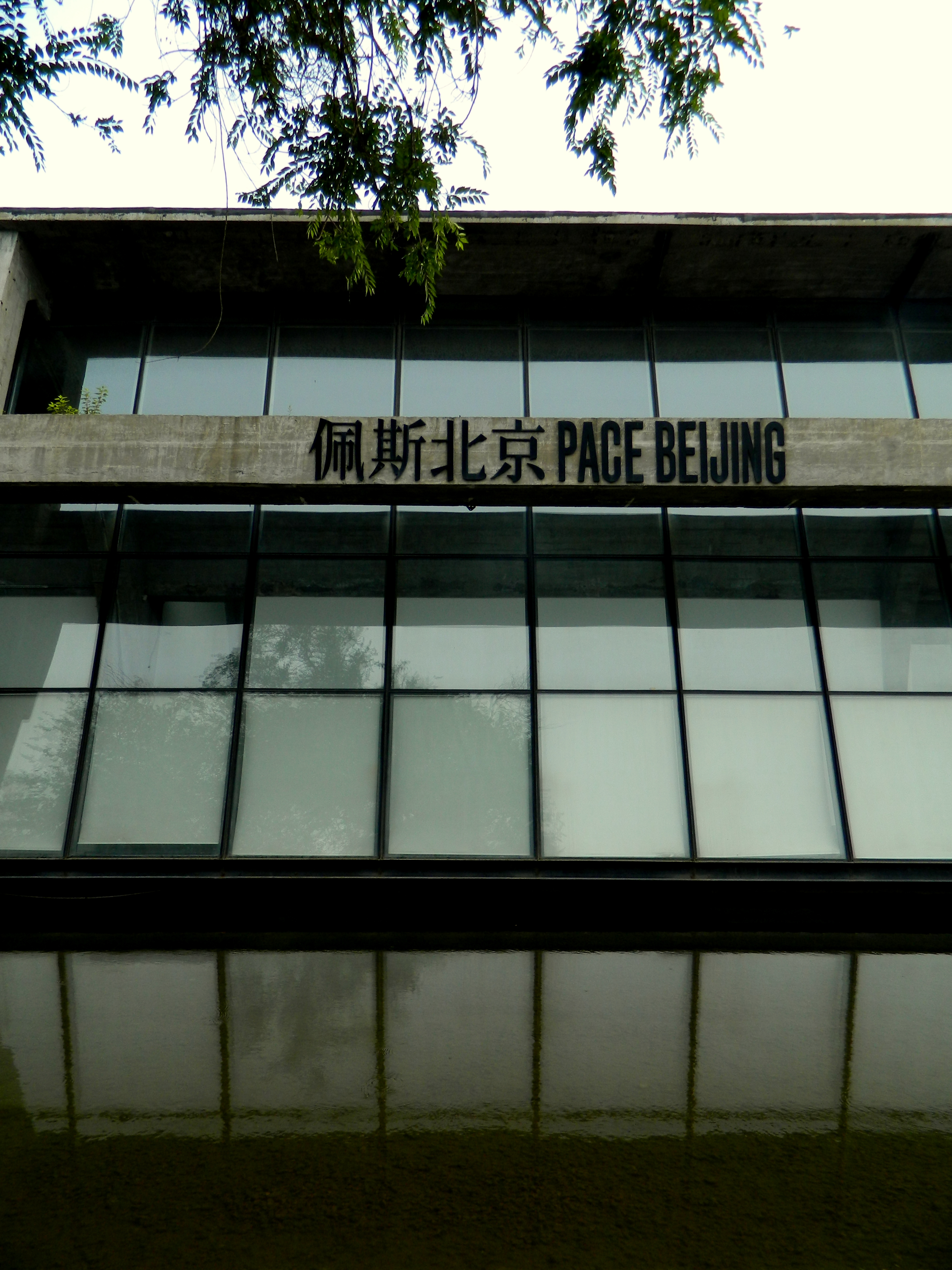
佩斯北京 Pace Beijing in 2012

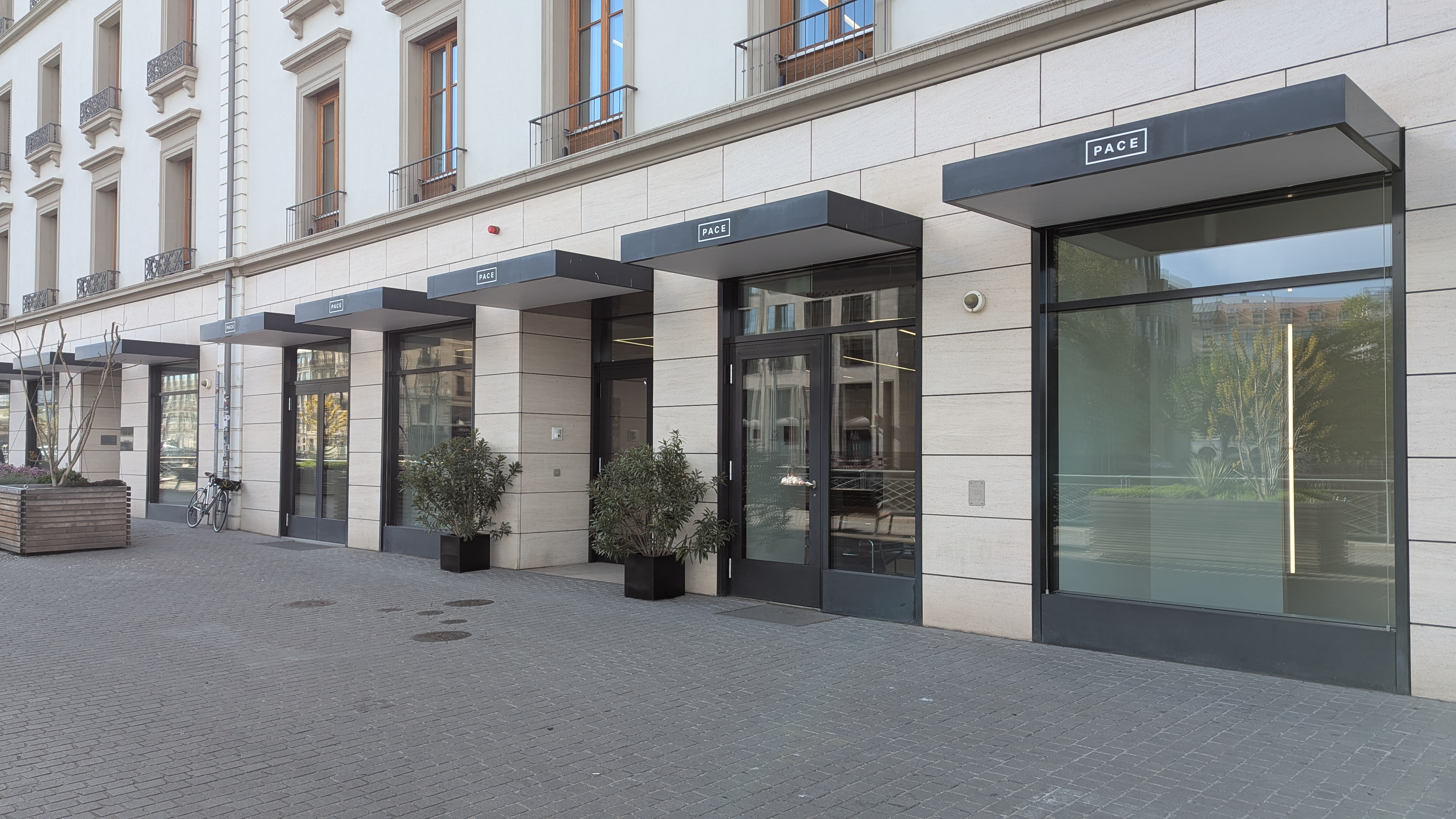
The Geneva gallery along the Rhone

From 2008 until 2019, PaceWildenstein – and later Pace – maintained a 22,000 square feet (2,000 square metres) space gallery in the Factory 798 District of Beijing, China; it was the first major Manhattan art gallery with a presence in the city. It opened in 2008 to coincide with the Summer Olympics in the city. Under the direction of its president, Leng Lin, Pace Beijing showed a mixture of American, European, and Asian artists.

From 2012 to 2020, Pace occupied the 9,000-square-foot (840-square-metre) west wing of the Royal Academy of Arts's 6 Burlington Gardens building in London, beginning with an exhibition that juxtaposed late paintings by Mark Rothko with photographs by Hiroshi Sugimoto.

In April 2014, Pace used the former Tesla Motors building in Menlo Park, California, as a 25,000 square feet (2,300 square metres) temporary exhibition space. It later operated a permanent gallery in downtown Palo Alto from 2016 to 2022.

Also in 2014, Pace operated a temporary space in Chesa Büsin, a historic 12th-century house in Zuoz, Switzerland. In 2018, it opened a permanent 3,700 square feet (340 square metres) gallery in Geneva.

Pace opened its first space in Seoul – a 925-square-foot (85.9-square-metre) gallery – in 2017 before moving to an 8,500-square-foot (790-square-metre) space in the city's Hannam-dong district, designed by Minsuk Cho.

In 2019, Pace opened a new space in New York's Chelsea district, designed by Bonetti/Kozerski Architecture, spanning eight stories across 70,000 square feet (6,500 square metres) — 10,000 square feet (930 square metres) of which are outdoor exhibition space. In addition to exhibitions, the building features Pace Live, a multidisciplinary music, dance, film and conversation program with a full-time curatorial director at the helm.

In 2020, Pace opened a temporary 1,700-square-foot (160-square-metre) exhibition space in East Hampton Village. In 2021, Pace relocated its London gallery to 4 Hanover Square in Mayfair, the former home of the now-defunct Blain Southern gallery, and enlisted Jamie Fobert to renovate the 8,600-square-foot (800-square-metre) space.

In June 2022, Pace Gallery partnered with the NFT platform Art Blocks, with the intention of each organization giving access to each other's collectors bases.

In December 2022, Samanthe Rubell was named President of Pace Gallery, and a "Round Table, consisting of the gallery's 10 most senior directors," was formed to formalize the gallery's structure.

In 2022, Pace partnered with Osulloc to create a café in Seoul, with artwork by Kohei Nawa. In 2024, Pace opened a permanent gallery in Azabudai Hills, Tokyo, Japan.

In June 2026, Glimcher announced sweeping cuts to the gallery's roster, with the aim of reducing the number of artists represented by Pace to 80. Glimcher argued that the mega-gallery model had become unsustainably focused on perpetual growth and that a readjustment was necessary. Around 50 artists and 50 staff members from across the business were removed. Pace also announced its intention to move away from its Mayfair gallery in London towards a 'less corporate' space, although it did not confirm whether this move would be accompanied by further job cuts.

== Other activities ==
=== Pace Verso ===
In November 2021, Pace launched their custom-built NFT platform with drops from Lucas Samaras's XYZ series.

=== Pace Wildenstein ===
From 1993 to 2010, Pace operated jointly with Wildenstein & Co., a gallery specializing in old master paintings, as PaceWildenstein. In 1993, after sales had slowed following the art-market crash of 1990, Arne Glimcher agreed to take up Daniel Wildenstein's long-standing merger offer; by 2010, the Glimcher family paid $100 million to buy back the Wildensteins' 49 percent share in Pace's assets, including an inventory of several thousand paintings.

=== Pace/MacGill ===
Pace is a partner in the Pace/MacGill, which specializes in photographs and is run by Peter MacGill. From 1983 until 2019, Pace/MacGill maintained its standalone space at 32 East 57th Street before consolidating with Pace's headquarters at 540 West 25th Street.

=== Pace Prints ===
Founded in 1968, Pace Prints (Pace Editions, Inc.) on East 57th Street was sold in 2024. Pace Prints operated Pace African & Oceanic Art (formerly Pace Primitive) between 1971 and 2024; it was first located in New York's Upper East Side neighborhood before moving moved to a Chelsea location in 2022.

== Publishing ==
Over the course of its first 50 years, Pace was involved in releasing some 450 catalogs for its shows and artists. In January 2009, PaceWildenstein announced plans for an independent publishing company called Artifex Press, dedicated to creating online artists' catalogs raisonnés. In 2015, the company launched a unit specifically for digital catalogs raisonnés.

== Controversy ==
In 2016, London art dealer James Mayor filed a lawsuit against Arne Glimcher and the Agnes Martin catalog raisonné committee, arguing that they had hurt the value of 13 works of Martin he sold after they decided not to include them in their catalog. The New York Supreme Court dismissed the lawsuit in 2018.

In 2017, the CBRE Group alleged that Pace had failed to pay them over $3 million in commissions for advising the gallery during negotiations to redevelop the gallery's flagship space at 540 West 25th Street with the building's owner, Weinberg Properties (WP). By 2022, a United States District Court for the Southern District of New York jury brokerage awarded CBRE $6.3 million in damages.

In 2020, an investigation by Artnet News revealed allegations that two presidents at Pace, Douglas Baxter, and Susan Dunne, had physically and verbally abused employees for nearly two decades. Former employees said that Baxter had thrown a phone at one employee's head, and an audio recording revealed him telling the Parrish Art Museum's director that a woman who accused Chuck Close of sexual misconduct "should go live in Puerto Rico and be a hurricane victim, or starve in Haiti or Ethiopia, or be a bomb victim in Aleppo." The gallery launched an investigation into the presidents' conduct and ultimately parted ways with both employees. Dunne moved to work at David Zwirner; however, Pace retained Baxter as an advisor. The company then restructured its leadership.

In 2022, Pace Gallery filed a lawsuit in the New York Supreme Court over a fake Georges Seurat drawing purchased for $2 million from a man purporting to be Seurat's descendant.

In May 2022, days before a Louise Nevelson sculpture was scheduled to hit the Sotheby's auction block, Glimcher declared the work to be inauthentic. Consequently, the Hardie Beloff estate, who consigned the piece to Sotheby's, filed a lawsuit in the US District Court for Eastern Pennsylvania in April 2024, accusing Pace of purposefully forgoing the sale to protect its control over Nevelson's market.
