= David Berger (artist) =

American artist

David Berger (May 9, 1920 – November 15, 1966) was an American artist whose work is often categorized as representative of the Boston Figurative Expressionist movement. Berger was a professor of art at Massachusetts College of Art, where he had been a member of the faculty since 1957. He was also a professor of art at Framingham State College from 1946 to 1957.

== Early life and education ==
Berger's parents came to the United States from Eastern Europe when they were children. The Berger family started and operated H. Berger Paper Company and then Koffman Paper, both in Massachusetts. And they were active in the local Jewish community. David was one of three children born to Edith (Koffman) Berger and Harry Berger in Lawrence, Massachusetts, in 1920. David attended public schools in Lawrence, Massachusetts, and while in middle school, he met Ruth Feldman, who would later become his beloved wife. He enrolled in Massachusetts College of Art, which was then called the Mass School of Art, married Ruth in 1943, and began military service in the U.S. Army.

His studies at the Massachusetts School of Art (now Massachusetts College of Art and Design; MassArt) were interrupted by his military service, but after the end of the war he returned to complete his education in the Teacher Education Department. During his senior year he began exhibiting his paintings. Berger received a Bachelor of Science in education from the Massachusetts College of Art in 1946. Following his graduation, he joined the faculty at Framingham State Teachers College. While employed there, Berger taught art appreciation, interior design, costume design, crafts, and introduction to art. He took a leave of absence from his teaching duties in 1949 to attend Cranbrook Academy of Art in Bloomfield Hills, Michigan, where he received a Master of Fine Arts degree in 1950.

After graduation, he returned to Framingham State, where he taught until 1957 when he joined the faculty at Massachusetts School of Art. There he taught classes in painting and illustration. While at Mass Art, Berger continued to win juried art competitions and his work was exhibited widely, with solo exhibitions at the Gropper Gallery, Cober Gallery, the Kalamazoo Art Institute in Kalamazoo, Michigan, Pace Gallery, and others.

== Career and accomplishments ==
Berger was an early member of the Boston Printmakers, now a national organization with a mission to “promote public knowledge of printmaking, encourage and support artists working in printmaking, and promote excellence and innovation within the field of printmaking.” Berger served as the WGBH-TV on-air host of the annual Boston Printmakers Exhibits at Boston Public Garden for many years. Berger's entire body of works on paper lithographs, serigraphs, and silkscreen prints is represented in the Print Collection of the Wiggins Gallery at Boston Public Library. In 1956 Berger was included in Art in America magazine's “100 Outstanding New Talents in the USA.”

In 1957, Ruth and David Berger worked with renowned MIT architect Marvin Goody to design and build a modernist house in Framingham, Massachusetts . The Berger home was the subject of a feature in Better Homes and Gardens magazine. At the time of his death in November 1966, Berger resided at that home in Framingham with his wife, Ruth Feldman Berger, and their two children. He held the rank of full professor at MassArt.

A memorial exhibition was held at DeCordova Museum in Lincoln, Massachusetts, in 1967. Boston Globe art critic Edgar Driscoll called the nearly 60 paintings on display there “alive with lovely color - fresh greens, singing blues, brilliant reds, vibrant yellows, glowing ochres, warming tans and browns or dashing purples…freshly conceived and freshly executed, occasionally in the manner of studio sketches, these tender, loving canvass are never, however, overly sentimental or banal” Berger's friend, colleague, and fellow artist, Lawrence Kupferman described his painting as “lyric projections on canvas of David's unquenchable belief in life and in the value of life”

In 2003, Alan Rosenburg curated an exhibit of Berger's work. He wrote, “When David Berger died in 1966, at 46 years old, he left behind a beloved wife, two little daughters and a wondrous legacy of paintings, sculptures and works on paper. Although he couldn’t have intended it, the image we envision of these circumstances, the mix of family love, grief, fear, fracture, as well as joy, ritual and celebration, is depicted in his art. If expressionism renders emotions through color and gesture of paint, then David Berger's figurative expressionism is a marvelous achievement in representing emotional poles: the joy of love, the terror of life, the delight of celebration and the chaos of nature's creation and destruction.”

Katherine French, curator of the 2015 Danforth Museum exhibition David Berger: Space for the Human Heart wrote “David Berger's paintings, prints and sculptures are ecstatic celebrations of domestic life. While the immediate subject may have been his own family, his intention was most decidedly universal. Called a “poet of the home” by fellow artist Lawrence Kupferman, Berger created paintings that worked to eliminate frantic activity from daily life and instead asked viewers to meditate on quiet moments shared between parents and children. Within simplified rooms and open landscapes, Berger's work describes a tranquil space in which there is room for the human heart.”

In 2018, his work was included in an exhibit at the DeCordova Museum called Lived Spaces: Humans and Architecture which featured artists whose work explores “our psychological and physical attachments to the places we build and inhabit. In their work, interior rooms function as receptacles of memory, emotion, and identity.”

A David Berger Memorial Scholarship was established in his name at Mass Art It has been awarded to:

- Susan Blatt (susanblatt.com)
- Robin Reynolds 1988
- Jen Roberts 1994
- Matt Murphy 2001
- Samantha Wilhelm 2011
- Kailyn Painting, for painting, 2011
- Arisole Forrester 2015

Boston Printmakers also established a David Berger Memorial Award which was awarded to

- David A Bumbeck 1967 – 68

== Collections ==
- DeCordova Museum
- Blanton Museum of Art
- Bradley University
- Worcester Art Museum
- Boston Public Library (Impressions Workshop and Albert H. Wiggin Collections)
- Butler Institute of American Art
- Danforth Art
- Museum of the University of New Hampshire
- Ogunquit Museum of American Art
- Museum of Fine Arts, Boston
- Smithsonian Archives of American Art.
