= What Comes Next =

2010 novel by John Katzenbach

- First edition (2010 Spanish) publ. Suma
- Author: John Katzenbach
- Language: English
- Genre: Thriller
- Publication date: 2012
- Publication place: United States

What Comes Next is a thriller written by the American author John Katzenbach published on June 5, 2012. It was translated into German, Spanish, English and Portuguese.

The story talks about a retired psychology professor struggling with dementia that witnesses a tortured teenager in the process of running away from home, kidnapped off the street. Unsatisfied by the police response, he decides to find her on his own. She is being held prisoner by a deranged and driven couple that are running an exclusive website named What Comes Next, on which paying customers can watch and comment that which befalls the imprisoned and tortured girl.

== Characters ==
=== Main characters ===
- Adrian Thomas: A retired widowed psychology professor that is diagnosed with Lewy body dementia, a terminal mental illness. His younger brother, a decorated Vietnam War veteran, killed himself. Adrian's wife also attempted suicide and shortly thereafter died after they were told that their son died as a war journalist in Iraq. He witnesses Jennifer's kidnapping from his driveway after arriving home from his terminal diagnosis. He suffers helpful hallucinations during the story and with the help of a pedophile, he achieves his objective, rescue Jennifer.
- Jennifer Riggins: A 16-year-old teenager who is angry with life because the death of her father. She has very poor communication with her mother and the possible abuse of her stepfather, also has very low social health. This situation leads her to escape from home but she gets kidnapped by a couple of criminals. When she is finally rescued, she starts studying Psychology.

=== Supporting characters ===
- Mark Wolfe: An registered sex offender and exhibitionist expert on porno that helps Adrian to find the correct pornography web page where Jennifer is being kidnapped and recorded. He lives with his mother with Alzheimer.
- Terri Collins: A woman detective that has a personal history with the Riggins. She has 2 kids and suffered domestic violence, and escaped from it. She helps and investigates the case of Jennifer, so she is an important part of the story and helps Adrian to achieve his objective.
- Linda and Michael: A couple of criminals, and owners of a sadistic pornographic web site. They capture and record their kidnapped victims in live. Michael obeys every instruction Linda says to him.
- Cassie, Brian, and Tommy: Adrian's dead wife, brother, and son, respectively, that appear in the hallucinations of Adrian and help him to understand the situation he is living and give him advice.
