= Paul Glimcher =

American neuroscientist, psychologist, and economist (born 1961)

- Born: Paul W. Glimcher; November 3, 1961 (age 64); Boston, Massachusetts, U.S.
- Education: Princeton University; University of Pennsylvania
- Known for: Neuroeconomics, Neuroscience
- Awards: Margaret and Herman Sokol Faculty Award in the Sciences 2003; NYU Lifetime Accomplishment Teaching Award 2006
- Scientific career
- Fields: Neuroeconomics, Neuroscience, Psychology, Economics
- Workplaces: New York University

Paul W. Glimcher (born November 3, 1961) is an American neuroeconomist, neuroscientist, psychologist, and economist. He is the Julius Silver Professor of Neural Science at New York University and has held leadership roles in NYU's neuroscience programs, including Director of the Neuroscience Institute at NYU Langone Health and Chair of the Department of Neuroscience and Physiology. His research has focused on neural mechanisms of decision-making and the development of neuroeconomics.

Glimcher co-founded NYU's Institute for the Study of Decision Making (ISDM) and helped establish the Center for Neuroeconomics, which later became ISDM. He also helped launch the HUMAN Project, a longitudinal research initiative, and co-founded Datacubed Health, a software company supporting behavioral and clinical research.

== Early life and education ==
Paul W. Glimcher was born in Boston, Massachusetts, the son of Arne and Mildred Glimcher. His father, Arne Glimcher, founded New York City's Pace Gallery. He attended the Dalton School in Manhattan, earned an A.B. in neuroscience from Princeton University in 1983, and a Ph.D. in neuroscience from the University of Pennsylvania in 1989 under psychologist C. Randy Gallistel. His postdoctoral work on oculomotor physiology examined how circuits controlling saccades may also participate in movement planning.

== Career and role in founding neuroeconomics ==
Glimcher joined NYU's Center for Neural Science in 1994. In 2004 he founded NYU's Center for Neuroeconomics (later ISDM), and in 2010 was named to the Silver Endowed Chair in Neural Science. He has argued for integrating neuroscience, psychology, and economics to study choice behavior, co-authoring early neuroeconomics work such as a 1999 Nature paper with Michael Platt on decision variables in parietal cortex. His book Decisions, Uncertainty and the Brain (MIT Press, 2003) helped popularize the term "neuroeconomics" and received a PROSE Award.

He co-edited the textbook Neuroeconomics: Decision Making and the Brain (Elsevier, 2008; 2nd ed. 2013) with Colin Camerer, Ernst Fehr, and Russell Poldrack; the first edition received a 2009 PROSE Award for Excellence in the Economic and Social Sciences. He later published Foundations of Neuroeconomic Analysis (Oxford, 2011).

=== The HUMAN Project ===
In collaboration with the Kavli Foundation's Miyoung Chun, Glimcher helped develop the Kavli HUMAN Project, a large-scale longitudinal study inspired by big‑data approaches, modeled on efforts such as the Framingham Heart Study. The study's aims and potential were discussed across scientific and policy venues.

=== Datacubed Health LLC ===
Glimcher co-founded Human Project Inc. (now Datacubed Health), commercializing software to support behavioral/clinical research and participant engagement; he has served as chief scientific officer.

== Research ==
Glimcher's research examines how the brain encodes value and guides decision-making, combining tools from systems neuroscience, psychology, and economics (including fMRI, single-unit electrophysiology, and experimental economics). Key contributions include: - Evidence for utility-like value coding in primate cortex (parietal decision variables). - Tests linking internal value representations to mixed-strategy equilibria in strategic choice (posterior parietal correlates). - Quantitative tests of dopamine reward prediction error signals in midbrain neurons. - Identification of subjective value signals in human medial prefrontal cortex during intertemporal choice. - Axiomatic approaches to measuring beliefs and rewards in neuroeconomic data. - Context-dependent "normalization" as a general neural mechanism for value coding and choice.

His work has also discussed applications to valuation of public goods using fMRI measures of subjective value.

== Honors and other work ==
Glimcher is a fellow of the American Association for the Advancement of Science and has received foundation support from McKnight, Whitehall, Klingenstein, and McDonnell Foundations. He has served on advisory and study committees for the U.S. National Academies and other national bodies. His textbooks and edited volumes have received PROSE Awards.

== Popular press ==
Glimcher's work has been covered in outlets including Time, Newsweek, Los Angeles Times, BBC, Le Monde, Frankfurter Allgemeine Zeitung, Quanta, New York Magazine, Science, New Scientist, Fast Company, and Vox.

== Books ==
- Glimcher, Paul W. (2003). Decisions, Uncertainty, and the Brain. MIT Press. ISBN 978-0-262-07244-1.
- Camerer, Colin; Fehr, Ernst; Poldrack, Russell, eds. (2008). Neuroeconomics: Decision Making and the Brain. ISBN 978-0-12-374176-9.
- Glimcher, Paul W. (2011). Foundations of Neuroeconomic Analysis. Oxford University Press. ISBN 978-0-19-974425-1.
- Camerer, Colin; Fehr, Ernst; Poldrack, Russell, eds. (2013). Neuroeconomics: Decision Making and the Brain. Academic Press. ISBN 978-0-12-416008-8.
