= John Katzenbach =

American author of popular fiction (born 1950)

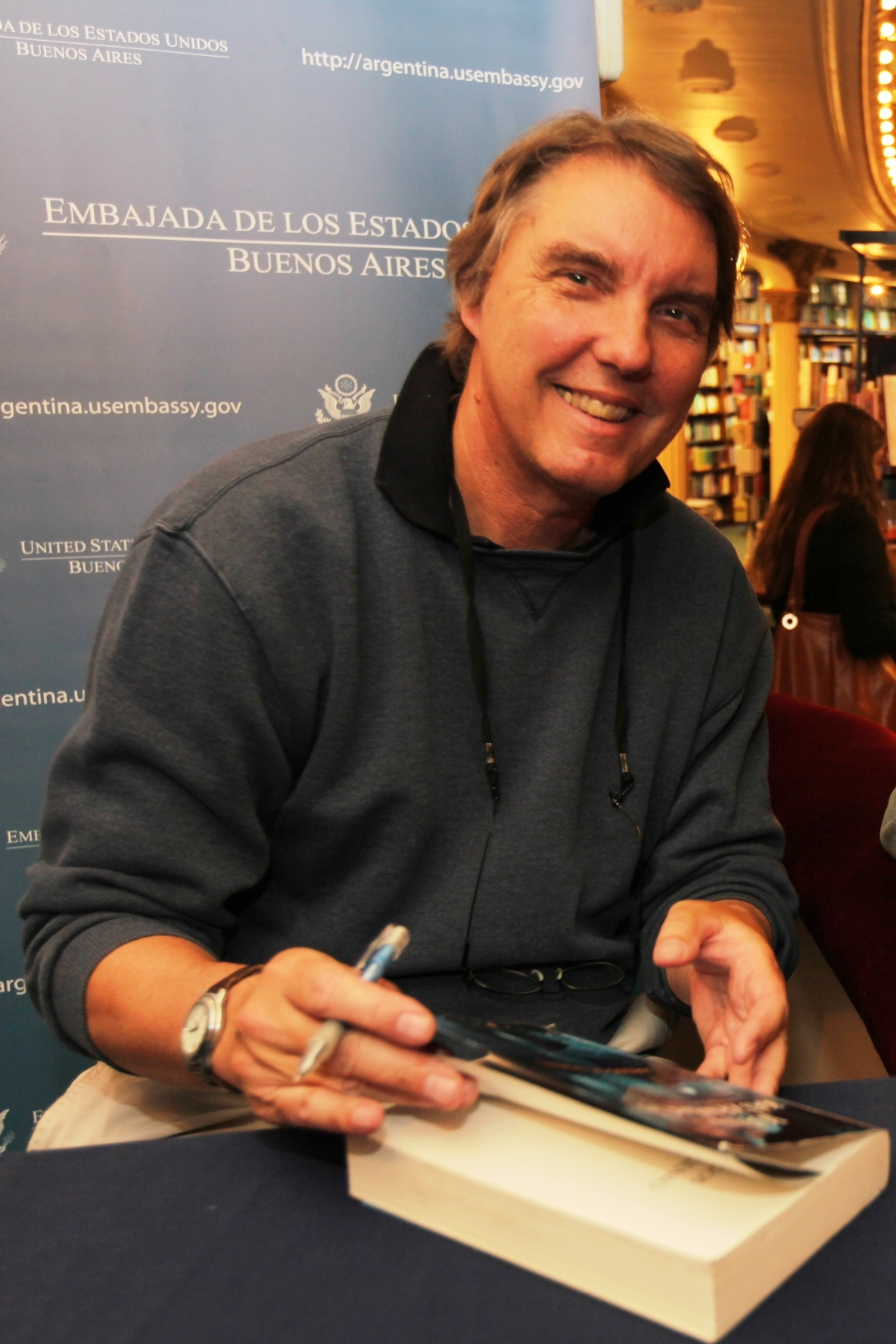
- Katzenbach in the Buenos Aires International Book Fair
- Born: June 23, 1950 (age 76); Princeton, New Jersey, U.S.
- Occupations: Writer and screenwriter
- Spouse: Madeleine Blais
- Writing career
- Period: 1987–present
- Genre: Suspense
- Website: johnkatzenbach.com

John Katzenbach (born June 23, 1950) is an American author of popular fiction. Son of Nicholas Katzenbach, former United States Attorney General, Katzenbach worked as a criminal court reporter for the Miami Herald and Miami News and as a featured writer for the Herald's Tropic magazine. He is married to Madeleine Blais, and they live in western Massachusetts.

He left the newspaper industry to write psychological thrillers. His In the Heat of the Summer (1982) novel was nominated for an Edgar Award and then became the movie The Mean Season (1985), starring Kurt Russell and Mariel Hemingway.

Two more of his books were made into films in the United States: Just Cause (1995) with Sean Connery and Hart's War (2002) with Bruce Willis. A fourth book, The Wrong Man, was made in 2011 as the French TV film Faux Coupable.

== Awards ==
Awards for Katzenbach's writing
Year	Title	Award	Result	Ref.
1983	In the Heat of the Summer	Edgar Allan Poe Award for Best First Novel	Finalist	
1987	The Traveller	CWA New Blood Dagger	Finalist	
1996	The Shadow Man	Edgar Allan Poe Award for Best Novel	Finalist	
2000	Hart’s War	Barry Award for Best Novel	Finalist	
2004	The Madman's Tale	Hammett Prize	Finalist	
2005	The Madman's Tale	Anthony Award for Best Novel	Finalist	

== Published works ==
- In the Heat of the Summer (1982)
- First Born (1984)
- The Traveler (1987)
- Day of Reckoning (1989)
- Just Cause (1992)
- The Shadow Man (1995; Edgar nominee)
- State of Mind (1997)
- Hart's War (1999)
- The Analyst (2002)
- The Madman's Tale (2004)
- The Wrong Man (2007)
- What Comes Next (2010)
- Red 1-2-3 (2012)
- The Dead Student (2014)
- By Persons Unknown (2016)
- The Analyst II (2018)
- The Architect
- Jack's Boys (2021)
- The Analyst III (2024)

== Film adaptations ==
- The Mean Season (1985) (based on In the Heat of the Summer)
- Just Cause (1995)
- Hart's War (2002)
- Faux Coupable (2011) (based on The Wrong Man)
