= Southfield Village =

Coordinates: 41.043°N 73.556°W

The Southfield Village was a housing project in Stamford, Connecticut. It was also known as "The V" by individuals living in that area. The area had been denoted by Stamford Police as "the most dangerous subsidized housing complex in Stamford."

== History ==
Southfield Village was a federal housing project that was built in 1954. The housing project consisted of 256 units within four eight-story buildings. In 1958, 525 families lived in the low-income housing complex. The families that occupied the buildings were said to live "in fear". It has since been torn down and replaced with smaller apartment buildings in a complex called Southwood Square.

Southfield Village was torn down following the 1993 shooting of a little 7-year-old girl attending her friends' birthday party. During the party, in which the participants were out in the back yard, the girl was shot during crossfire from members of The Nation gang. Although there had been past violence in Southfield Village, this shooting signalled the beginning of the end of the housing complex.

Southfield Village existed well before 1954 as a series of two-story buildings housing low-income people.
