= Francis H. Holmes House =

Historic house in Connecticut, United States

- U.S. National Register of Historic Places
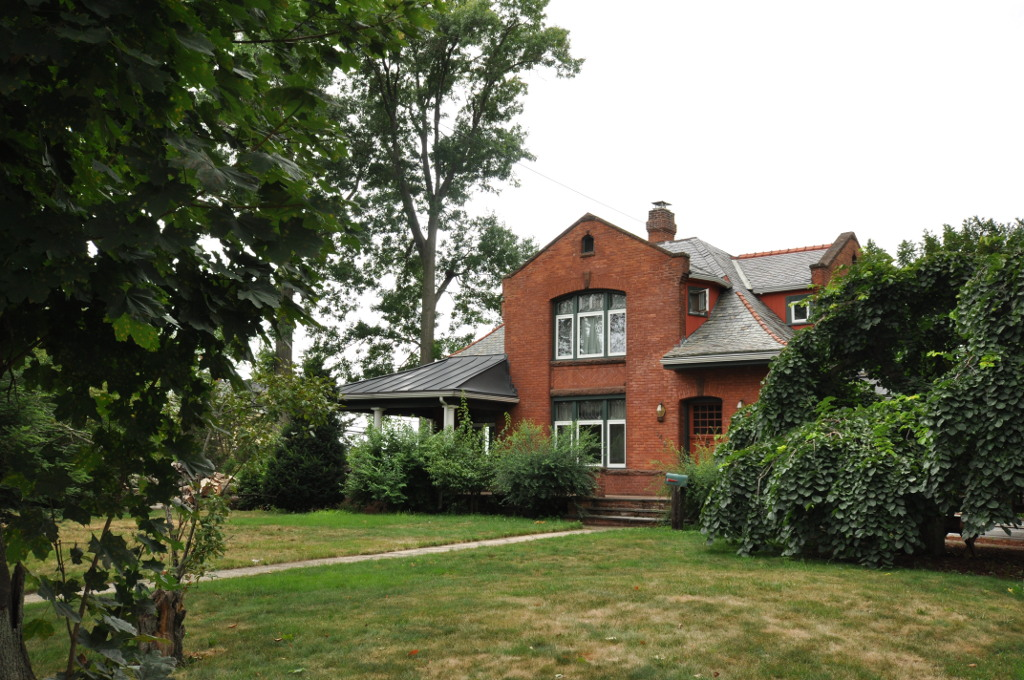

- Location within Connecticut Location within the United States
- Location: 349 Rocky Hill Avenue, New Britain, Connecticut
- Coordinates: 41°39′14″N 72°45′34″W
- Area: 1 acre (0.40 ha)
- Built: 1906
- Architect: Crabtree, Walter P.
- Architectural style: Tudor Revival, Shingle Style
- NRHP reference No.: 84001014
- Added to NRHP: June 28, 1984

The Francis H. Holmes House is a historic house at 349 Rocky Hill Avenue in New Britain, Connecticut. Built in 1906–08, it is an architecturally eclectic brick building, designed by a prominent local architect for the owner of a local brickmaking business, as a showcase for the latter's wares. The house was listed on the National Register of Historic Places in 1984.

== Description and history ==
The Francis H. Holmes House is located in southeastern New Britain, at the northwest corner of Rocky Hill Avenue and South Street. It is a two-story brick structure, with a flared hip roof and brownstone trim. It exhibits an architecturally eclectic mix of styles, with the Jacobethan use of triple windows and gables predominating. Also present are elements of Shingle style and Craftsman woodwork. The roof is pierced by large gabled dormers with brownstone parapets. An enclosed porch wraps from the east-facing facade to the south, and a similarly styled former porte-cochere, now also enclosed, is on the north side.

The house was designed by Walter P. Crabtree and built in 1906-08 for Francis Holmes, who owned a local brickyard. Crabtree was a prominent local architect whose credits include the local Masonic lodge, the Elks building, and numerous commercial and residential buildings in New Britain and Hartford. Holmes owned a brickyard just to the south in Berlin, and was instrumental in founding the Central Connecticut Brick Company, a consolidation of several regional brickyards.

== See also ==
- National Register of Historic Places listings in Hartford County, Connecticut
