= Superblue (disambiguation) =

Superblue or Super Blue may refer to:

- Superblue (born 1956), Trinidadian musician
- Superblue (band), American jazz ensemble
- Super Blue, a 1978 album by Freddie Hubbard
- SuperBlue, a 2021 album by Kurt Elling and Charlie Hunter
- Superblue (art gallery), an interactive art gallery in Miami, Florida

== See also ==
- Super Blues, a 1967 album by Bo Diddley, Muddy Waters, and Little Walter
- Superblues, a 1994 album by Pete York
