= Mark Dent-Brocklehurst =

British stockbroker

Geoffrey Mark Dent-Brocklehurst (25 April 1932 – 9 September 1972) was a British stockbroker and the heir to Sudeley Castle. He was the son of Major John Henry Dent-Brocklehurst and his wife, Mary (née Morrison). Via his paternal grandmother, Marion Lascelles, he is a descendant of Henry Lascelles, 3rd Earl of Harewood. Thus he was a third cousin of George Lascelles, 7th Earl of Harewood. Michael Hicks Beach, 2nd Earl St Aldwyn, whose mother was Marjorie Brocklehurst, was his first cousin.

Dent-Brocklehurst died suddenly from a heart attack in 1972, aged 40. The castle passed to his wife, Mary Elizabeth (née Chipps), and their two children, Henry and Mollie. His wife remarried Henry Cubitt, 4th Baron Ashcombe, in 1979.

== Ancestry ==
Ancestors of Mark Dent-Brocklehurst

16. John Brocklehurst
8. Henry Brocklehurst
17. Mary Coare
4. Captain Henry Dent Brocklehurst
18. John Fielden
9. Anne Mary Fielden
19. Ann Grindrod
2. Major John Henry Dent-Brocklehurst
20. Henry Lascelles, 3rd Earl of Harewood
10. Hon. Egremont Lascelles
21. Lady Louisa Thynne
5. Marion Lascelles
22. Neil Malcolm, 13th of Poltalloch
11. Jessie Elizabeth Malcolm
23. Harriet Mary Clarke-Jervoise
1. Mark Dent-Brocklehurst
24. James Morrison
12. Alfred Morrison
25. Mary Anne Todd
6. Lt.-Col. James Archibald Morrison
26. Rev. Richard Seymour Conway Chermside
13. Mabel Chermside
27. Emily Dawson
3. Mary Morrison
28. Arthur Hill, 3rd Marquess of Downshire
14. Edwin Hill-Trevor, 1st Baron Trevor
29. Lady Mary Windsor
7. Hon. Mary Hill-Trevor
30. Rev. Hon. Alfred Curzon
15. Hon. Mary Catherine Curzon
31. Sophia Holden
