= Ralph Boteler, 1st Baron Sudeley =

English baron and aristocrat

The Right Honourable Ralph Boteler 1st & 6th Baron Sudeley
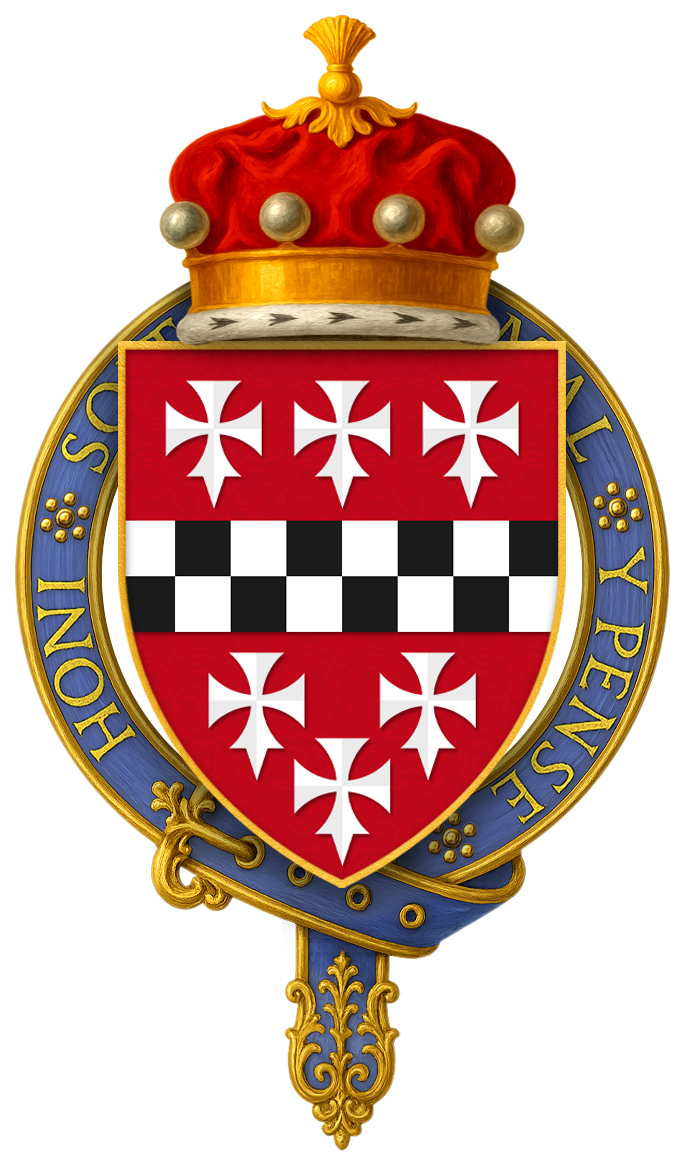
- Arms of Sir Ralph Boteler

Lord High Treasurer
- In office 7 July 1443 – 18 December 1446
- Monarch: Henry VI of England
- Preceded by: Ralph de Cromwell, 3rd Baron Cromwell
- Succeeded by: Marmaduke Lumley, Bishop of Carlisle

Lord Chamberlain of the Household
- In office 1441–1447
- Monarch: Henry VI of England
- Preceded by: William Phelip, 6th Baron Bardolf
- Succeeded by: James Fiennes, 1st Baron Saye and Sele

Chief Butler of England
- In office 1435–1458
- Monarch: Henry VI of England
- Preceded by: John Tiptoft, 1st Baron Tiptoft
- Succeeded by: John Talbot, 2nd Earl of Shrewsbury

Personal details
- Born: c. 1394 Sudeley Castle
- Died: 2 May 1473
- Spouse(s): Elizabeth Norbury (m. 1418; died 1462); Alice Lovel (m. 1463; died 1474)
- Children: Thomas Boteler
- Parent(s): Thomas Boteler; Alice Beauchamp

Military service
- Allegiance: House of Lancaster
- Commands: Captain of Arques & Crotoy (1423); Captain of Calais (1425)
- Battles/wars: Hundred Years' War (1415-1453) Wars of the Roses: First Battle of St. Albans

Ralph Boteler, 1st Baron Sudeley KG (c. 1394 – 2 May 1473) was an English baron and aristocrat who rose up through the ranks of the courts of King Henry V and Henry VI to become the Lord High Treasurer of England. He fought in the Hundred Years' War and was made the Captain of Calais, and was later present at the execution of Joan of Arc. He is most notably remembered for largely rebuilding the Manor of the More, later home of Queen Katherine of Aragon, and Sudeley Castle, the final home and resting place of Queen Katherine Parr.

== Family ==
Ralph Boteler was the youngest surviving son of Thomas Boteler of Sudeley Castle, Gloucestershire and Alice Beauchamp (d. 1443), daughter of Sir John Beauchamp of Powick, Worcestershire.

== Marriage ==
Sudeley married twice. About 1418 he married into commercial wealth through Elizabeth, widow of John Hende (d. 1418), former Mayor of London. She died in 1462, and in the following year, he married Alice (d. 1474), daughter of John, 4th Baron Deyncourt, and widow of William, 7th Baron Lovel of Titchmarsh, Northamptonshire, who survived him.

== Lord Sudeley ==
The Boteler's elevation to the aristocracy arose from the marriage of Ralph's grandfather, William le Boteler of Wem, to heiress Joan de Sudeley, which later led to Ralph's father succeeding to the title of Lord of Sudeley. The Barony of Sudeley was conferred upon his father by Letters Patent. The title then passed to both Ralph's elder brothers, John who died unmarried and childless in 1410, and William, who also died childless seven years later, despite being married. William's widow, Alice, would later be appointed governess of King Henry VI of England in 1424.

Ralph Boteler is thought to have served with King Henry V of England in France, as he was awarded grants of land there between 1420 and 1421. He was captain of Arques and Crotoy in 1423, and took muster in Calais in 1425.

When Ralph was created Baron Sudeley by King Henry VI, he inherited Sudeley Castle, which he rebuilt in 1442, using what he had earned from fighting in the Hundred Years' War. Unfortunately, he failed to gain royal permission to crenellate it, and had to seek King Henry's pardon. He would eventually lose it later in 1469, when King Edward IV of England confiscated the castle from him, due to his support for the Lancastrian cause. From 1443 to 1446, Ralph served as Lord High Treasurer of England. Boteler's tenure as Lord High Treasurer occurred during the Great Bullion Famine and the Great Slump in England.

== Descendants ==
The Botelers inherited the barony of Sudeley after the death of John de Sudeley, 3rd Lord Sudeley, in 1367 who died in Spain while fighting for the Black Prince, Edward of Woodstock. Sudeley left no surviving male heir from either marriage, for his son Thomas predeceased him, also without a male heir. Thomas's widow, Eleanor, was the Lady Eleanor Butler (known as the Holy Harlot), whose alleged precontract of marriage to Edward IV of England was claimed to have invalidated Edward's marriage to Elizabeth Woodville and so legitimized the usurpation of Richard III of England. The Sodrés, Portuguese corruption of "Sudley", were a well-connected Portuguese family of English origin, said to have been descended from Frederick Sudley, of Gloucestershire, who accompanied the Earl of Cambridge to Portugal in 1381 to fight for the House of Aviz against Castile between 1381–1382 and subsequently settled down there. The granddaughter of Sudley is Isabel Sodre, mother of Vasco da Gama and whose uncles were Bras and Vincente Sodre and travelled with da Gama to Goa. Additionally, the Sodres also descend from John de Sudley who went to Portugal in 1386 with Queen Phillipa of Lancaster as part of her retinue, her secretary

Political offices
Preceded by Ralph de Cromwell	Lord High Treasurer; 1443–1446	Succeeded by Marmaduke Lumley
Preceded by Lord Bardolf	Lord Chamberlain; 1441–1447	Succeeded by Lord Saye and Sele
