= Mollie Dent-Brocklehurst =

British art curator

- Occupation: Art curator
- Children: 2
- Parent(s): Mark Dent-Brocklehurst (father); Elizabeth Chipps (mother)

Mollie Dent-Brocklehurst is a British art curator and former president of London's Pace Gallery. In 2026, she co-founded DoubleMoon. She co-founded Superblue and was the chief creative officer from 2020 until 2026. She and members of her family own Sudeley Castle, where she has curated sculpture exhibitions.

== Art career ==
Dent-Brocklehurst began her career in the mid-1990s at Sotheby's London and then in New York. It was there that she joined the Gagosian Gallery, becoming a director in 1997. In 1999, Dent-Brocklehurst returned to London to orchestrate the opening of Gagosian's first London Gallery where she became the first director until 2008. She worked alongside Dasha Zhukova to found The Garage Centre for Contemporary Culture in Moscow that same year. Parallel to this, between 2004 and 2008, Dent-Brocklehurst organized the reconstruction sculpture project at Sudeley Castle, her ancestral home. This project triggered a number of similar exhibitions, such as those at Chatsworth and Blenheim Palace, which brought monumental contemporary sculpture to Grade I listed grounds.

In 2010, she was appointed to set up the first branch of Pace Gallery in London, where she was the president from 2012 to 2017. In 2017, she joined the Founder of FutureCity, Mark Davy, in a two-year project named Future/Pace, which aimed to extend the reach of contemporary art beyond the conventional boundaries of gallery walls, bringing it into the public domain. Future/Pace delivered site-specific contemporary art projects by artists such as Leo Villareal and Studio Drift.

In 2020, she co-founded Superblue with Marc Glimcher and Laurene Powell Jobs. Superblue opened its first space in Miami in 2021 following delays related to the COVID-19 pandemic. Superblue's emphasis on immersive and experimental art, together with its revenue-sharing model with artists, set it apart from other traditional museums and galleries. In September 2023, Dent-Brocklehurst was appointed chief creative officer of Superblue, and Marc Spiegler joined the Superblue board of directors.

== Personal life ==
Dent-Brocklehurst married Duncan Ward in 2002 and they have two children. They divorced in 2012.

== Ancestry ==
Ancestors of Mollie Dent-Brocklehurst

16. Henry Brocklehurst
8. Captain Henry Dent Brocklehurst
17. Anne Fielden
4. Major John Henry Dent-Brocklehurst
18. Hon. Egremont Lascelles
9. Marion Lascelles
19. Jessie Elizabeth Malcolm
2. Mark Dent-Brocklehurst
20. Alfred Morrison
10. Lt.-Col. James Archibald Morrison
21. Mabel Chermside
5. Mary Morrison
22. Edwin Hill-Trevor, 1st Baron Trevor
11. Hon. Mary Hill-Trevor
23. Hon. Mary Catherine Curzon
1. Mollie Dent-Brocklehurst
6. Dr. Henry Davis Chipps
3. Mary Elizabeth Chipps
