= Sudeley Castle =

Famous castle in England

- Winchcombe, Gloucestershire in England
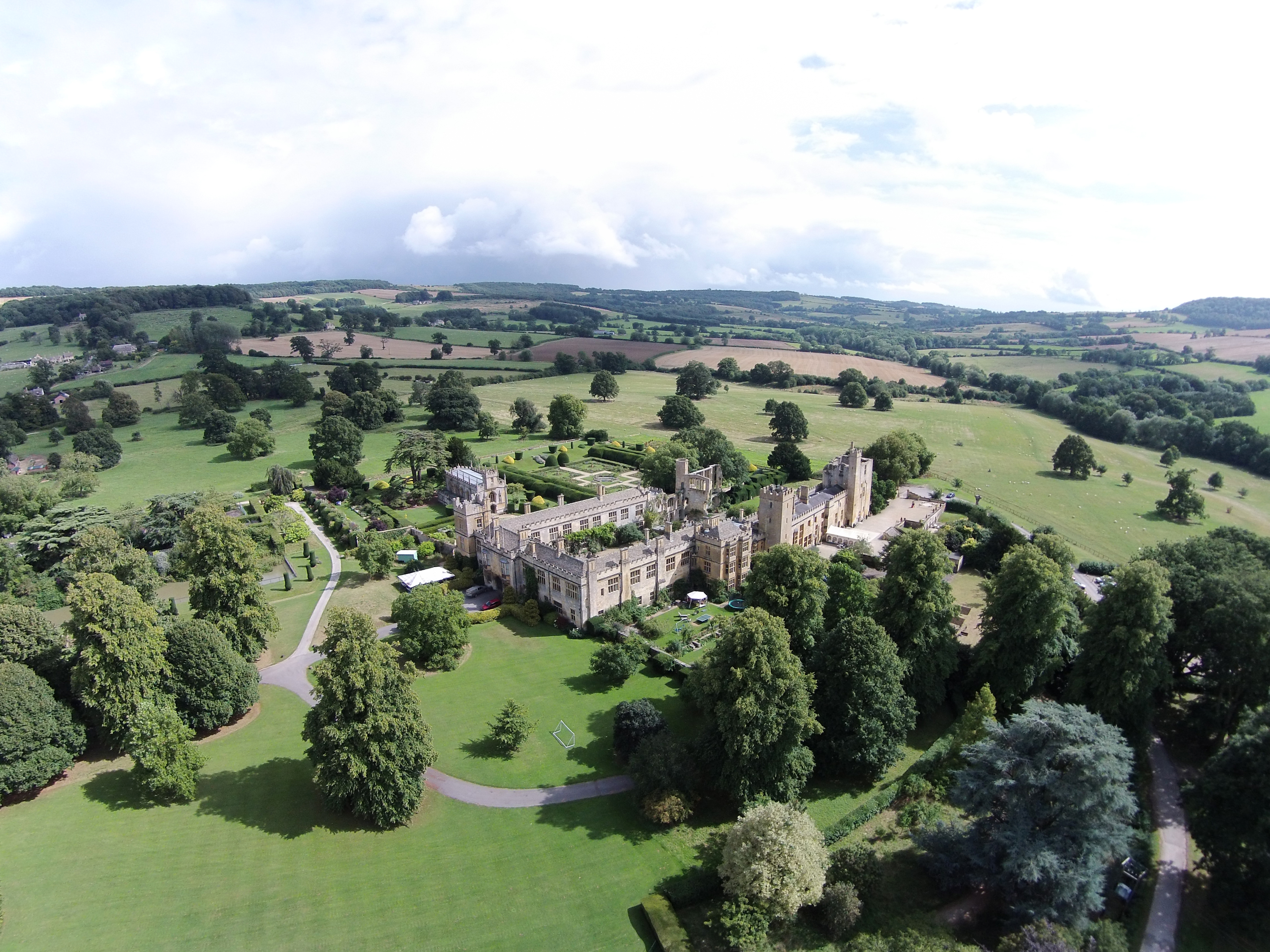
- Aerial view of Sudeley Castle

Site information
- Type: Visitor Attraction, Wedding Venue and Private Residence
- Owner: Elizabeth, Lady Ashcombe; Henry Dent-Brocklehurst; Molly Dent-Brocklehurst
- Open to the public: Seasonally
- Status: Intact
- Website: www.sudeleycastle.co.uk

Location
- Coordinates: 51°56′50″N 1°57′22″W
- Area: 1,200 acres

Site history
- Built: 1443 on the site of a previous fortified manor house
- Built by: John de Sudeley (d.1165); Ralph Boteler (1394–1473); King Richard III (1452–1485); Thomas Seymour (1508–1549); Edmund Brydges (1522–1573)

Listed Building – Grade I
- Official name: Sudeley Castle
- Designated: 4 July 1960
- Reference no.: 1154791

National Register of Historic Parks and Gardens
- Official name: Sudeley Castle
- Designated: 28 February 1986
- Reference no.: 1000784
- Battles/wars: The Anarchy (1135–1153); First English Civil War (1642–1646)

Sudeley Castle is a Grade I listed castle in the parish of Sudeley, in the Cotswolds, near to the medieval market town of Winchcombe, Gloucestershire, England. The castle has 10 notable gardens covering some 15 acres (6.1 ha) within a 1,200-acre (490 ha) estate in the Cotswold hills.

Building of the castle began in 1443 for Ralph Boteler; the Lord High Treasurer of England, on the site of a previous 12th-century fortified manor house. It was later seized by the crown and became the property of King Edward IV and King Richard III, who built its famous banqueting hall.

King Henry VIII and his then wife Anne Boleyn visited the castle in 1535; and it later became the home and final resting place of his sixth wife, Catherine Parr who remarried after the king's death. Parr is buried in the castle's church, making Sudeley the only privately owned castle in the world to have a Queen of England buried in its grounds. Sudeley soon became the home of the Chandos family, and the castle was visited on three occasions by Queen Elizabeth I, who held a three-day party there to celebrate the defeat of the Spanish Armada.

During the First English Civil War, the castle was used as a military base, by King Charles I and Prince Rupert, and it was later besieged and slighted by parliament, remaining largely in ruins for the following few centuries until its purchase in 1837 by the Dent family, who restored the castle and turned it into a family home.

== History ==
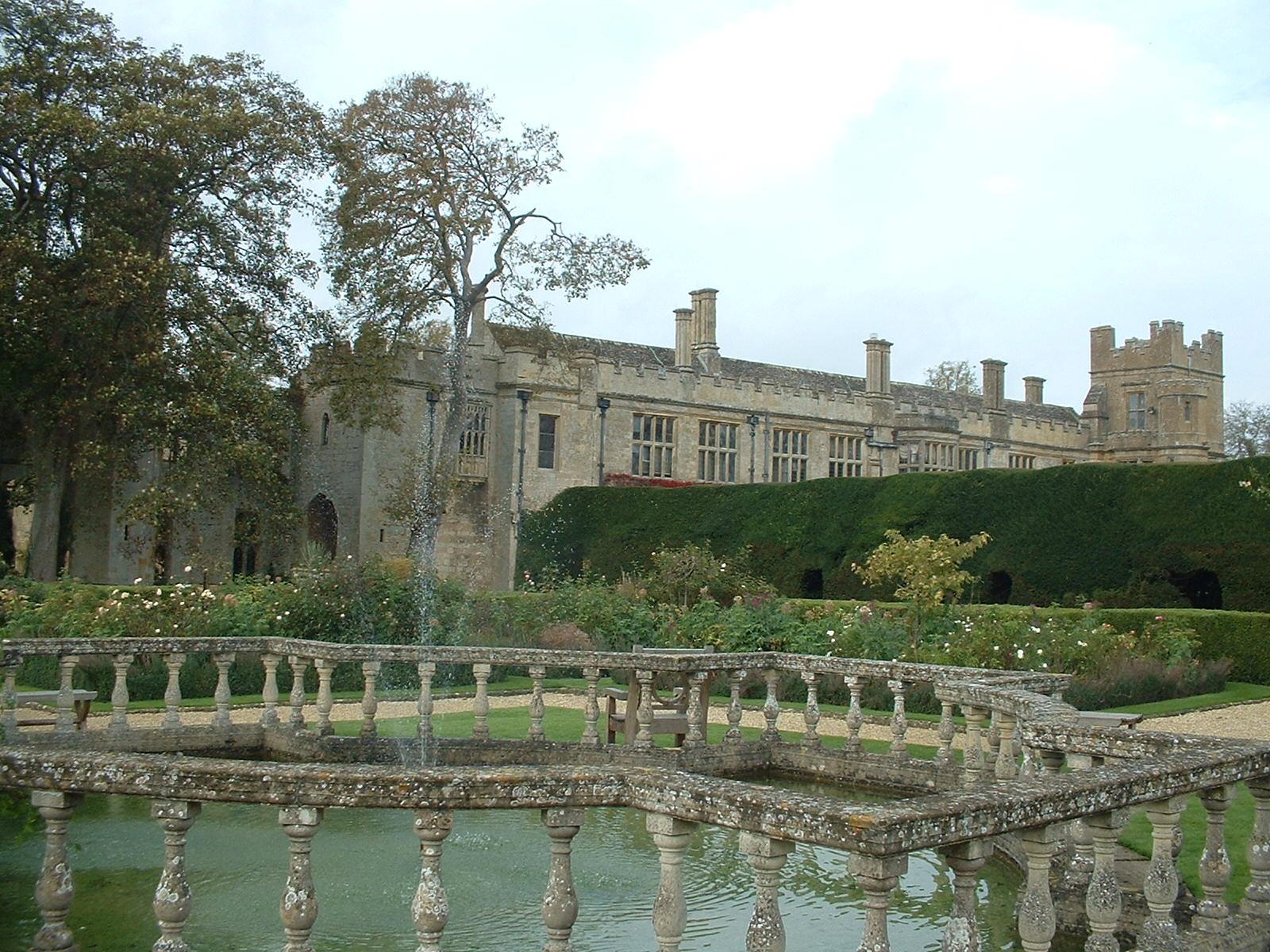
The Queens' Gardens at Sudeley Castle

=== 11th century ===
Although the origins of Sudeley are lost to time, its name is a corruption of the Anglo-Saxon name Sudeleagh, meaning 'south lying pasture or clearing in forest', gives an indication of how the area was like. Sudeley most likely owes its early rise as a royal estate to its proximity to Winchcombe, which, during the reign of King Offa, was the capital of the Kingdom of Mercia. Under royal patronage, Winchcombe prospered, becoming a walled town with its own monastery, where a king and a saint are now buried.

By the turn of the 11th century, Sudeley had grown into a manor house set in a royal deer park, given as a gift from King Æthelred the Unready to his daughter Goda on her wedding day.

Despite William the Conqueror's policy of depriving Saxon nobles of their estates after the Norman Conquest of 1066, the family managed to retain Sudeley, and Goda's descendants would hold it for another four centuries.

=== 12th century ===
During The Anarchy, John de Sudeley supported the Empress Matilda in her fight against her cousin, Stephen of Blois.

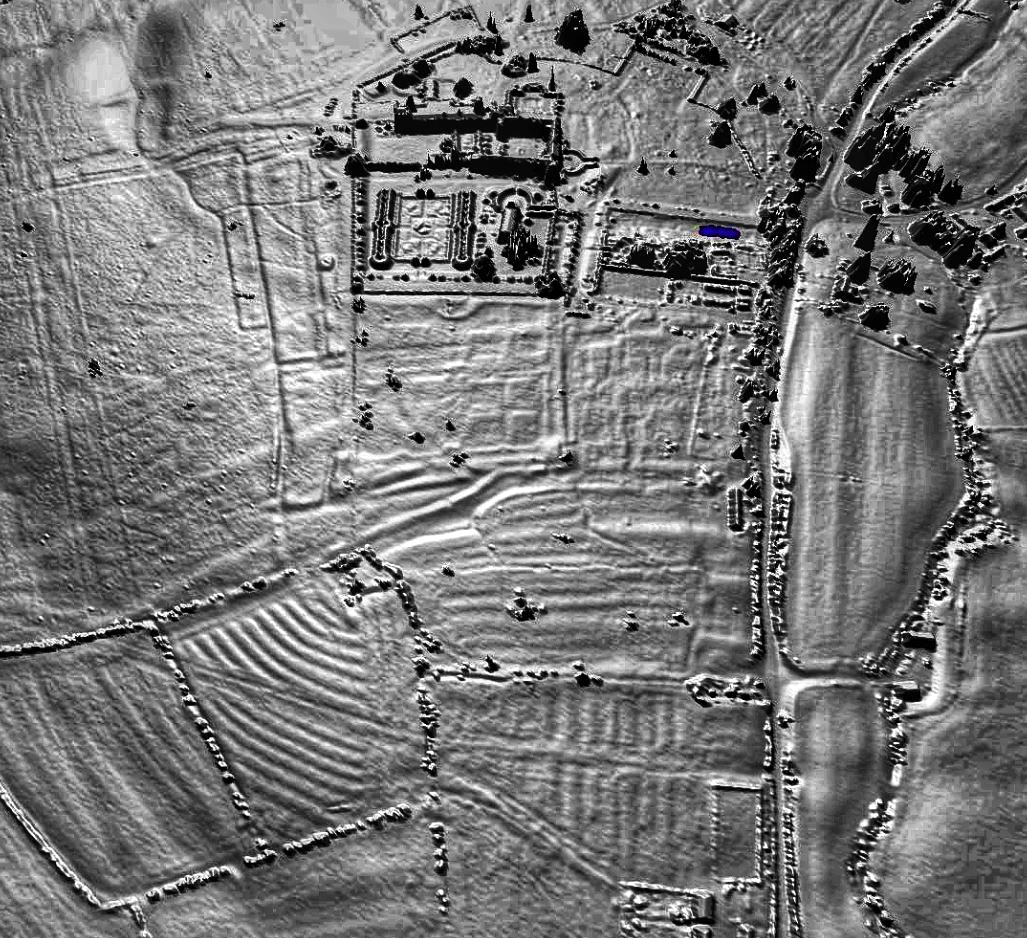
A lidar view of Sudeley Castle with the site of the early Medieval manor house and field system and early to Medieval deserted settlement

It is believed that the first castle at Sudeley was built during this time, otherwise known as an adulterine castle. Nothing is known as to what this castle looked like; it may have simply been the fortification of the existing manor house, or an altogether new structure.

However, after the sacking of Worcester in 1139 by the forces of the Empress Matilda, under her brother Robert of Gloucester, Waleran de Beaumont, 1st Earl of Worcester retaliated, attacking and capturing both Sudeley and Tewkesbury.

Although little is known of what happened to Sudeley during this attack, it seems likely that its fortifications were pulled down by the Earl of Worcester, as soon after Roger, Earl of Hereford built a replacement motte and bailey castle in Winchcombe.

A few decades after the Anarchy, the Sudeley family stepped once more in the world stage with John's younger son, William de Tracy, participated in the murder of Thomas Becket, Archbishop of Canterbury. William was subsequently excommunicated by Pope Alexander III. He went on pilgrimage to Rome in 1171 and gained an audience with the pope, who exiled him and his fellow conspirators to Jerusalem.

=== Construction of the current castle ===
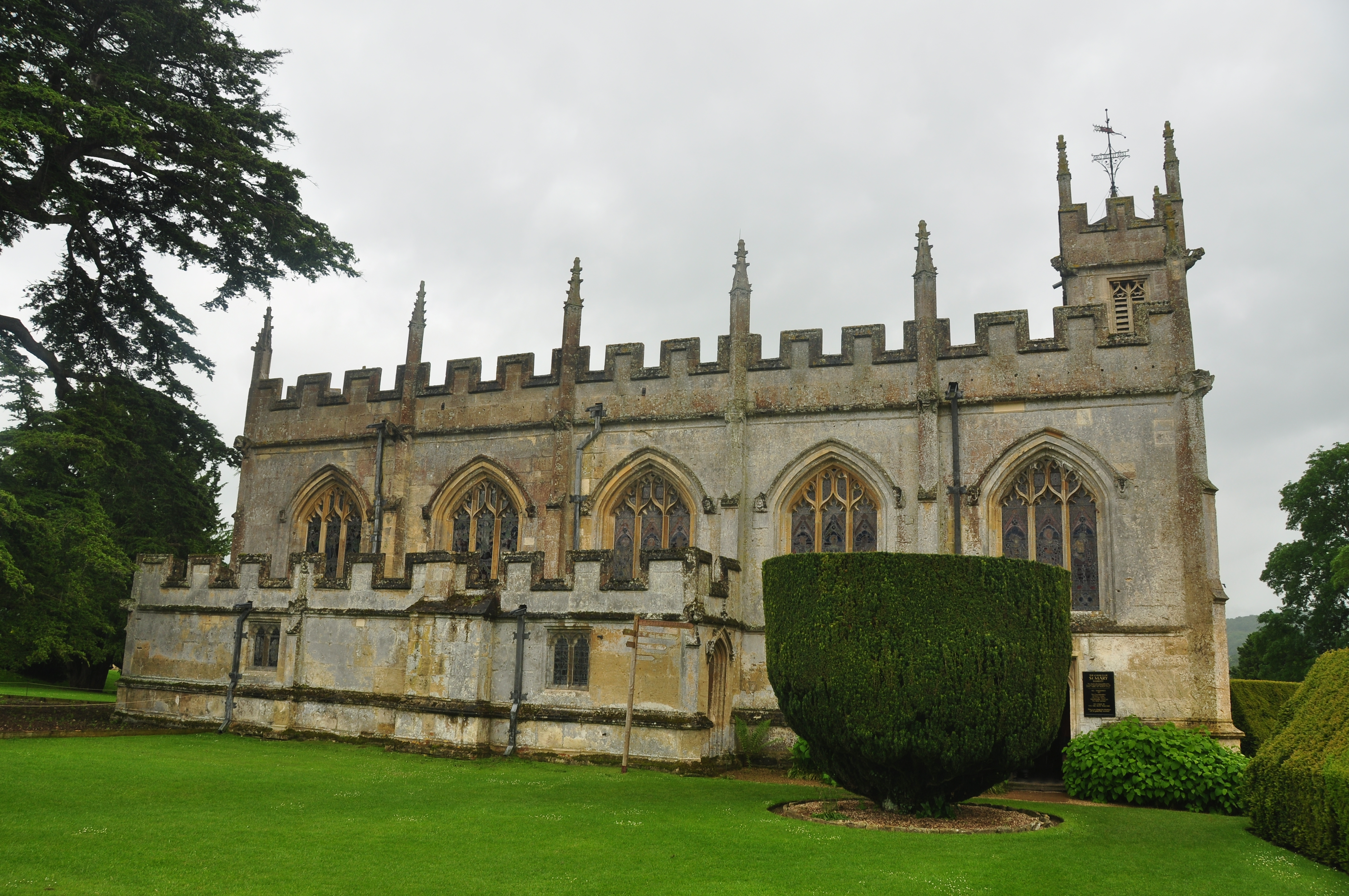
St Mary's Chapel, built c. 1460

By the start of the 15th century, the Sudeley name was believed to have gone extinct and the Boteler family had inherited the castle through the marriage of Joan, the sister of the last de Sudeley.

Ralph Boteler is believed to have started the construction of the castle in 1443, around the same time he became Lord High Treasurer of England. He rose to prominence during the Hundred Years' War; serving in France under John of Lancaster, 1st Duke of Bedford in 1419, and was later appointed to the Regency Council of King Henry VI in 1423 and created Baron Sudeley.

Sudeley was not Ralph's first great project, having extensively renovated the Manor on the More, the house he used when attending court, and was later described by a French Ambassador, Jean du Bellay, as more magnificent than Hampton Court. Unfortunately, Ralph failed to gain royal permission to crenellate the castle, and had to seek Henry VI's pardon.

Ralph built Sudeley Castle on a double courtyard plan; with the outer courtyard being used by servants and men-at-arms, and the inner court and its buildings reserved for the use of Ralph and his family.

In 1449, Ralph's son, Thomas Boteler, married Lady Eleanor Talbot, famed as England's Secret Queen for her relationship with King Edward IV after the death of her husband. It was this relationship that King Richard III used to illegitimise his brother's children and heirs, clearing the way for himself to take the crown.

=== Richard III ===
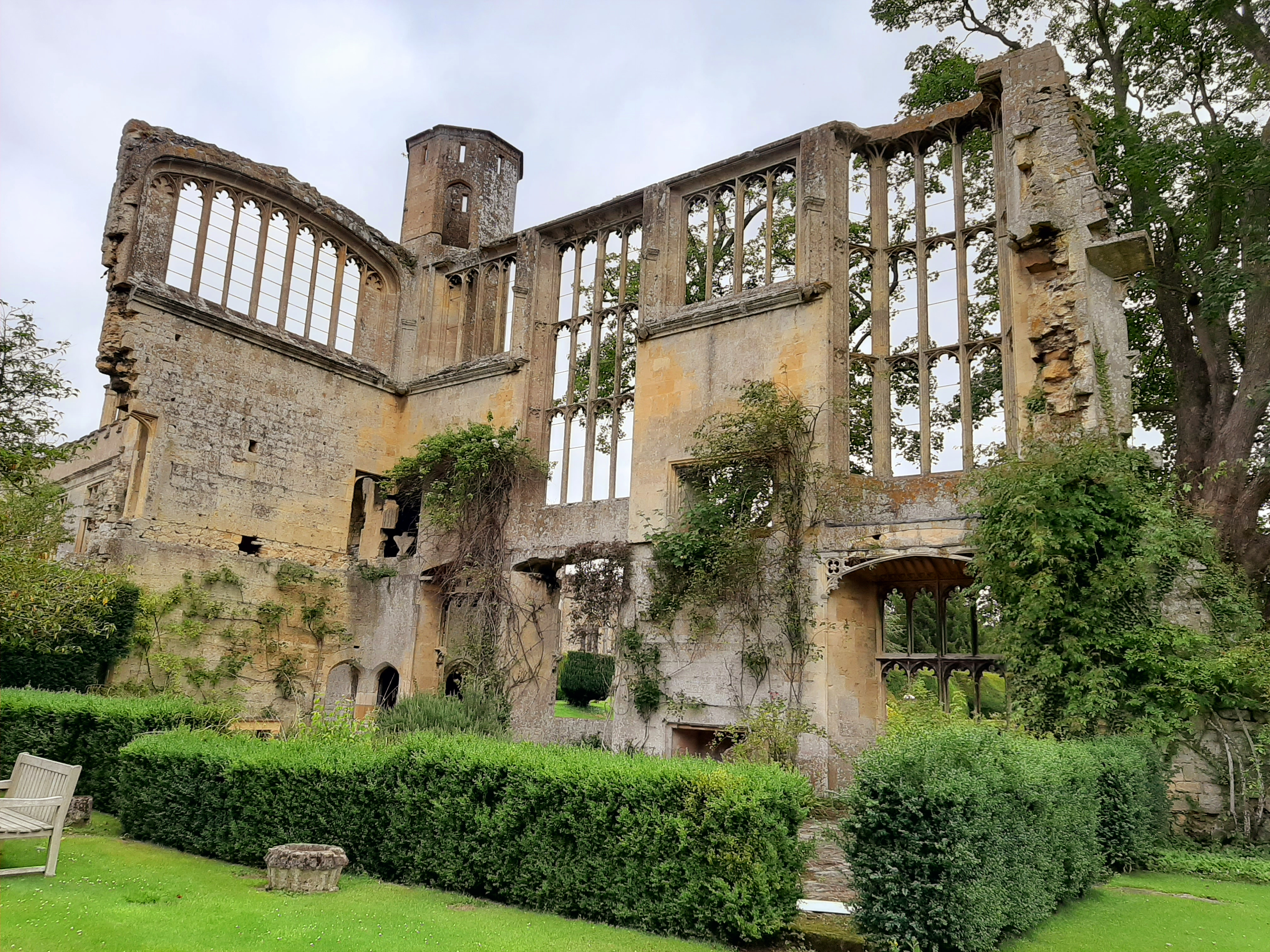
Richard III Banqueting Hall

Ralph, now out of favour as a supporter of the Lancastrian cause, was in 1469 compelled to sell Sudeley and six other manors to the crown. Edward IV bestowed Sudeley upon his brother, Richard, Duke of Gloucester, who used it as a military base before the Battle of Tewkesbury in 1471.

In 1478, Richard swapped Sudeley for Richmond Castle, before re-inheriting it when he acceded to the throne in 1483, when he seems to have visited both Sudeley and Kenilworth Castle on a Royal Progress.

Richard is credited with having built the large banqueting hall at Sudeley. This "Great Hall" was built in the latest fashions of its time, with a ground floor hall being used for meeting guests and feasting, and the upper great hall being kept specially for the king and his special guest's use, with his own bedchambers being connected to this room. When approached from the outside, the edges of the hall's oriel windows are decorated with what is presumed to be the White Rose of York.

The banqueting hall now lies in partial ruins, and has been redesigned as a garden, with roses and ivy climbing the walls. In 2018, conservators were working to stabilise the ruin.

After the death of Richard at the Battle of Bosworth in 1485, Sudeley, as property of the crown, transferred to King Henry VII, who in turn presented it to his uncle Jasper Tudor.

=== Catherine Parr ===
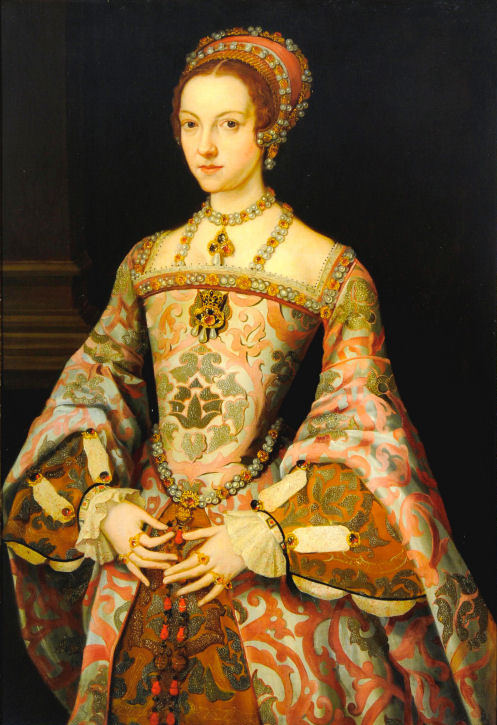
The Melton Constable or Hastings portrait of Catherine Parr

During his reign, King Henry VIII only stayed at Sudeley once, on his 1535 Royal Progress with Anne Boleyn. In the months leading up to Henry's visit to Sudeley, he started to enact the Dissolution of the Monasteries, executing Bishop John Fisher and Sir Thomas More. Moreover, it was while he was at Sudeley that Pope Paul III and Holy Roman Emperor Ferdinand I started discussing his excommunication and removal.

The death of Henry and the accession of King Edward VI led way for the rise of Edward and Thomas Seymour. Henry's will had an "unfulfilled gifts" clause that allowed for his executors to award themselves new lands and titles, which led to Edward being declared Lord Protector of the Realm, and making his brother Baron Seymour of Sudeley.

A few months after this, Thomas secretly married Henry's widow and final wife, Catherine Parr, without the permission of the king, causing a minor scandal.

In 1548, Catherine, now pregnant, moved with her husband to Sudeley Castle, taking a considerable retinue: 120 Yeomen of the Guard and Gentlemen of the Household, plus her ladies-in-waiting. Prior to her arrival, Seymour had spent "vast amounts of money on the Castle, to fit it for a Queen". The castle was specially prepared for this move, and descriptions still exist of what Catherine's bedchamber looked like. During Parr's tenure, one of her attendants was Lady Jane Grey, Thomas Seymour's ward, who would be queen for nine days in 1553.

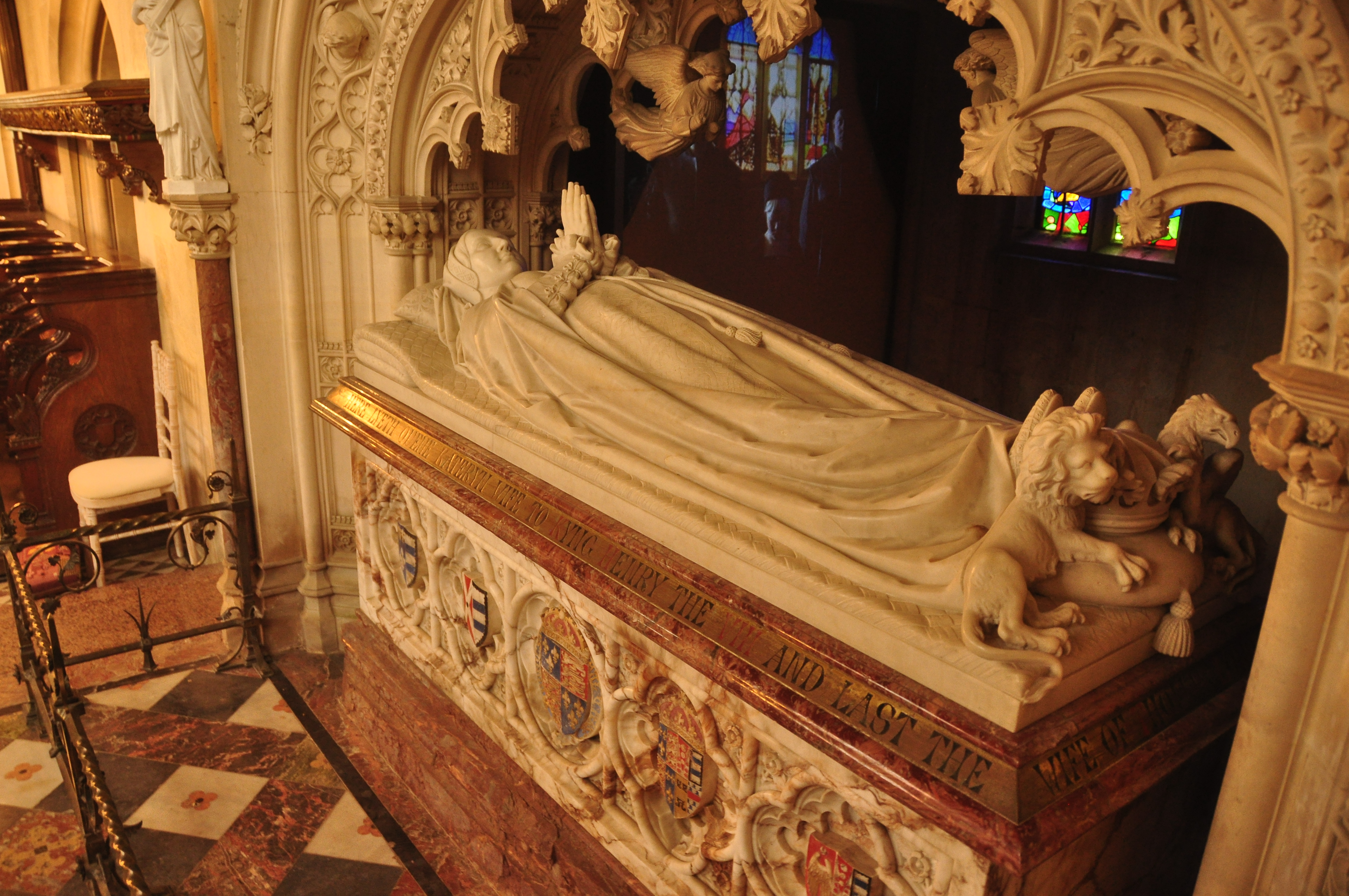
Tomb of Catherine Parr, added in 1863

Catherine died at Sudeley on 5 September 1548 from what was described as "childbed fever", five days after giving birth to her daughter Mary Seymour. At the funeral, Lady Jane Grey was the chief mourner, and ecclesiastical reformer Myles Coverdale preached his first Protestant sermon.

Catherine was buried two days later at St. Mary's Church, within the grounds of Sudeley, in what was the first Protestant funeral in English. Over the next two centuries, her original tomb was "mutilated and defaced" and the location of her burial place was lost. In 1782, a coffin was discovered, with a lead plate that read "Here lyeth Quene Kateryne wife to Kyng Henry the VIII and Last the wife of Thomas Lord of Sudeley... dyed 5 September...". In 1792, vandals dug up the coffin. In 1817, the remains were placed in a stone vault near the remains of the 6th Lord Chandos.

After the chapel restoration was completed in 1863, Parr's remains were placed in a new neo-Gothic canopied tomb designed by George Gilbert Scott and created by sculptor John Birnie Philip.

Today, her tomb with its life-sized effigy lying under a canopy of ornately carved marble, is considered a place of pilgrimage.

After Catherine's death, her husband Thomas retained Sudeley; he held it until he was executed for treason six months later. Catherine's brother William Parr, 1st Marquess of Northampton, then inherited the castle, he in turn held Sudeley until 1553, when he was also accused of treason, and Sudeley was seized by the crown.

=== Late 16th century ===
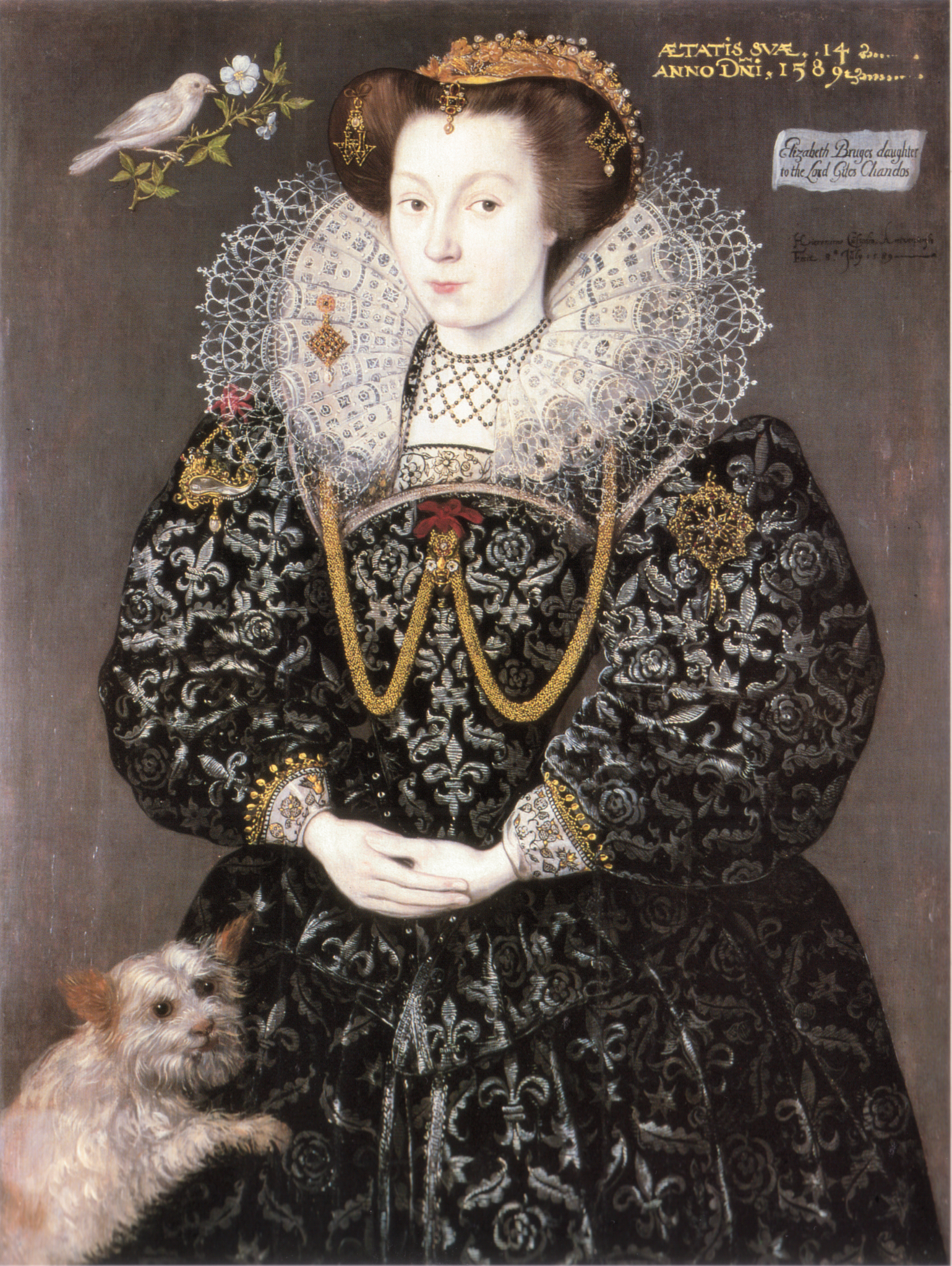
Signed and dated portrait of Elizabeth Brydges, aged 14. Daughter of Giles Brydges, 3rd Baron Chandos. She became a maid of honour to Elizabeth I in 1589.

On 8 April 1554, John Brydges was elevated to Baron Chandos of Sudeley by Queen Mary I. He had previously been Lieutenant of the Tower of London, befriending Lady Jane Grey. He was the one who led Jane to her execution while she was in his care.

His elevation almost certainly came from his assistance in the suppression of the Wyatt rebellion.

His son Edmund Brydges heavily remodelled the castle in the 1560s and 1570s, almost completely rebuilding the outer courtyard, the part of the castle that the current family occupy, into what we see now.

Elizabeth I stayed at Sudeley on three occasions during her reign, first visiting her old friend, the recently widowed Dorothy Bray, Baroness Chandos at Sudeley in 1574. Staying again during the Royal Progress of 1575, that saw Robert Dudley throw a lavish party at Kenilworth Castle in a final attempt to convince her to marry him.

Elizabeth's most famous stay at Sudeley was in 1592, when Giles Brydges, 3rd Baron Chandos threw a three-day party for her. Giles extensively landscaped the grounds surrounding the castle in preparation for the visit, and held banquets, plays, dances and gave extravagant gifts during her stay, even presenting his daughter, Elizabeth Brydges to the queen in the guise of Daphne. The visit reputedly almost bankrupted the Brydges family.

The yearly excavations by archaeologists DigVentures began in 2018 and set out to discover more about this party, uncovering extensive Tudor Gardens to the east of the Victorian reconstructed gardens currently on the site. Through these investigations, evidence of multiple phases of landscaping have been revealed, the earliest of which dated to the middle of the 16th century. This is significant as previously these gardens had been attributed to Giles Brydges, 3rd Baron Chandos and the landscaping efforts in advance of Elizabeth's visit. LiDAR shows extensive areas surrounding the castle grounds which still may contain the evidence of these works, but it is worth noting that there appears to have been another phase of work, likely associated with the works done by Thomas Seymour in advance of the arrival of Catherine Parr.

=== English Civil War ===
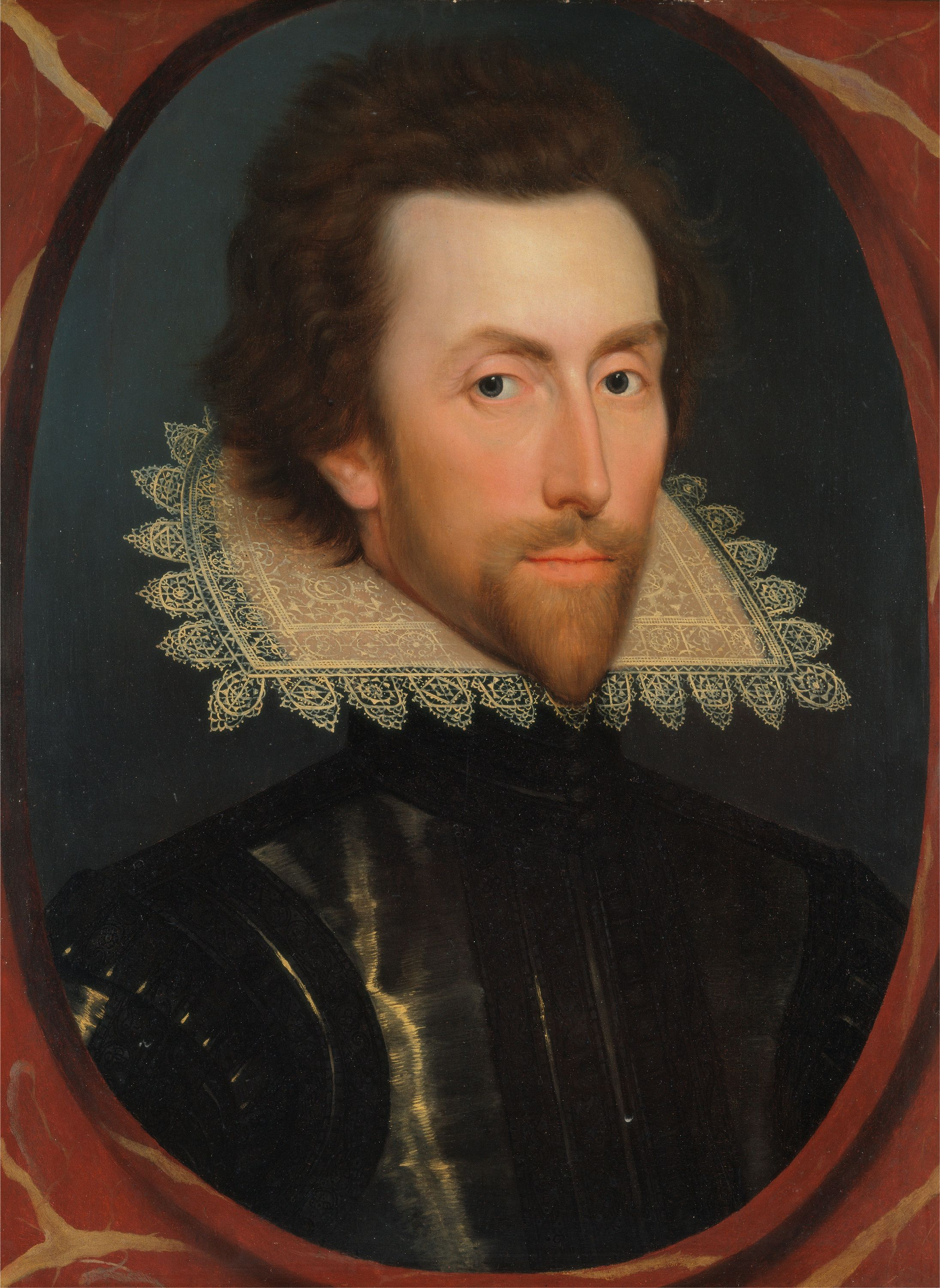
Grey Brydges, 5th Baron Chandos "King of the Cotswolds"

Under the Chandos family, Sudeley continued to prosper and thrive, with Grey Brydges, 5th Baron Chandos gaining the title "King of the Cotswolds" for his magnificent style of living and his generosity. Records show that he had been buying in expensive tapestries from abroad through William Trumbull, envoy to the Archdukes of Austria, to decorate Sudeley. Grey was an influential courtier and an avid traveller, extensively travelling Europe and taking part in the War of the Jülich Succession. He married Lady Ann Stanley, descendant of Henry VIII's younger sister Princess Mary Tudor, and possible heir to the throne of England. He died in 1621.

Sudeley's final royal occupant was to be Charles I during the English Civil War, a war that was fought between the king and parliament.

The new lord, George Brydges, 6th Baron Chandos supported the royalist cause, and it was while he was supporting Prince Rupert in the siege of Cirencester in January 1643 that Sir Edward Massey, with some five hundred soldiers and two cannons attacked the castle. The small garrison soon fell and the castle was plundered; soon to be abandoned after the news that the royalist army had taken Cirencester and was turning its attention to the castle.

Later that year, after the royalist army failed in the Siege of Gloucester, Charles I set up camp at Sudeley, using it as his base of operations in Gloucestershire; and then set about trying to force Robert Devereux, 3rd Earl of Essex into an open pitch battle.

The castle was to switch hands several times during the war, most famously holding out against cannon bombardment by Sir William Waller, until it was betrayed by one of its officers who let the attackers in.

In 1649, after the end of the civil war, parliament ordered the slighting of the castle, to ensure that it could never again be used as a military post. The process took some five months to complete, largely dismantling the inner courtyard and royal apartment rooms, but strangely leaving much of the outer courtyard intact. In 1650, George Brydges, 6th Baron Chandos received some financial compensation for the loss of the castle.

Buried in debt, the lord was unable to rebuild Sudeley, and he died in 1655 after years of being imprisoned in the Tower of London. On his death, the semi derelict castle was inherited by his widow, Lady Jane Savage, separating from the title Baron Chandos for the first time in over a century. She did not have the means to restore it and the castle was a neglected ruin for almost 200 years.

=== Victorian renaissance ===
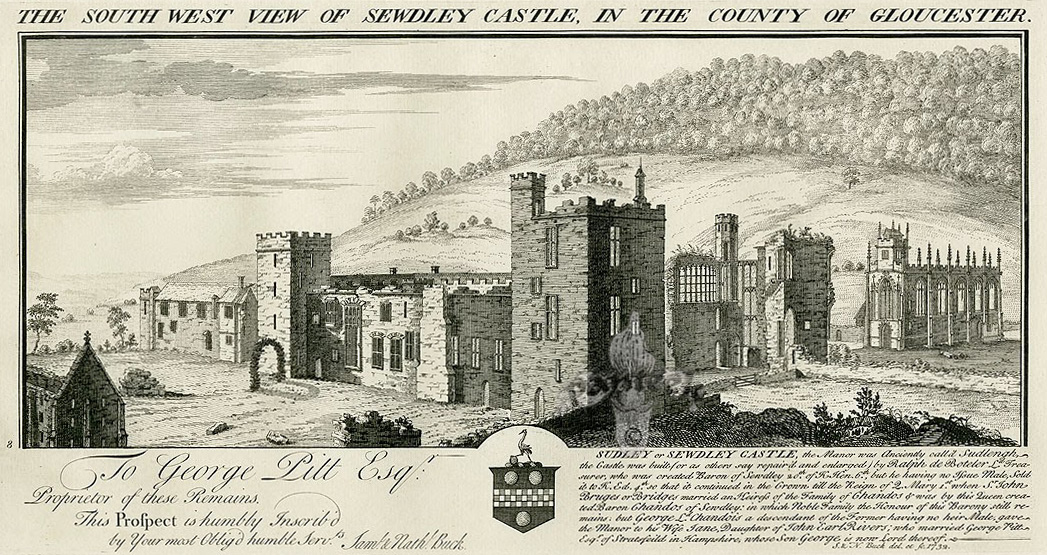
Engraving of Sudeley Castle in 1732, showing the ruinous inner court, and still occupied outer court.

For almost two centuries, the castle was largely left in ruins, but seemingly never becoming fully abandoned.

Sudeley was owned by the Pitt family, descendants of Lady Jane Savage's second marriage, who were elevated to a peerage in 1776 as Baron Rivers.

During the 18th century, they rented Sudeley out to tenants, most notably the Lucas family, members of the local gentry. Joseph Lucas entertained King George III on his visit to the castle in 1788, with Mrs Cox the housekeeper saving the king's life, catching him after he fell down the Octagon Tower. The Lucas family were also involved in the rediscovery of Catherine Parr's tomb in 1782; her corpse was found to be "entire and uncorrupted".

In 1837, Sudeley Castle was purchased by brothers John and William Dent of Worcester, wealthy glove manufacturers, whose father had founded Dents Gloves in 1777. At the time of the purchase, the castle was "ruinous, but partly occupied by tenants".

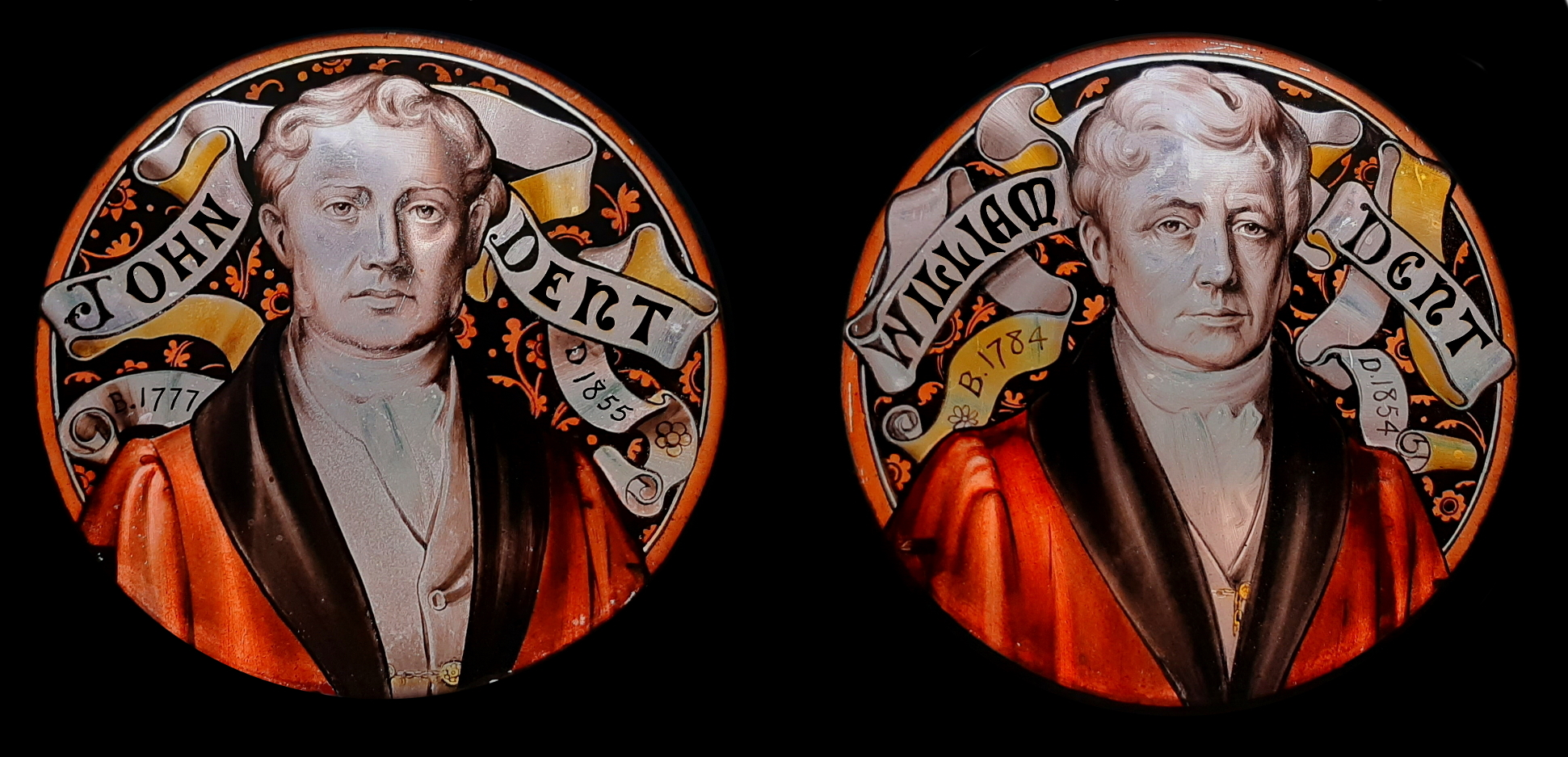
John and William Dent, the brothers who made their fortune in gloves, and purchased and restored the castle in 1837

One of the previous tenants, John Attwood, had turned the castle into a public house "The Castle Arms", and treated it as a quarry, breaking it up and selling off the stone, timber and lead.

A 2020 report described the condition of the castle at the time of the purchase:

the castle comprised the remains of two courtyards linked together to form a figure-of-eight plan. Three sides of the outer court were enclosed by two-storey ranges that had, over time, variously accommodated cottages, farm buildings and even a tavern. All the remainder of the building was ruinous, including a medieval barn to the west of the castle and the chapel.

The Dents' restoration of the castle was quite sensitive, deciding to not entirely rebuild the castle; rather, leaving part of it as picturesque ruins, giving the castle much of its character still seen today. One reliable source states that the restoration was directed by George Gilbert Scott, "working on the western side of the inner court in the style of the existing Medieval and Elizabethan buildings"; Gilbert Scott subsequently began the restoration of the castle's free-standing St Mary's chapel.

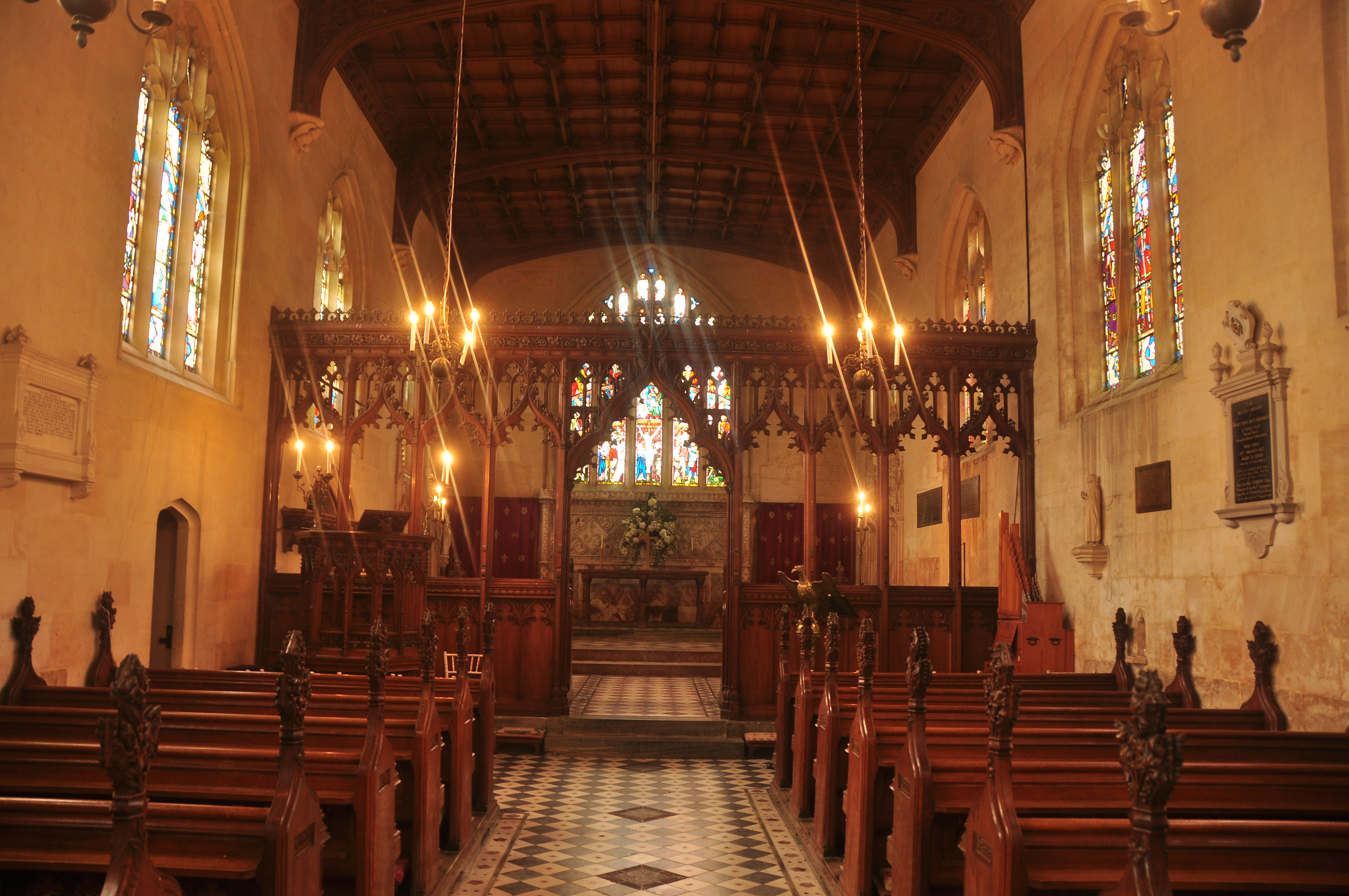
St Mary's Chapel

The chapel is a Grade I* listed property, as "Church of St Mary". The summary states "Circa 1460 for Ralph Boteler, late C15 or early C16 north aisle, restored 1859–'63 by Sir G.G. Scott for J.C. Dent". (Ralph Boteler, 1st Baron Sudeley was the owner during the first restoration of the castle and the chapel.) The summary goes on to state that the chapel exterior dates primarily to the 15th and 16th centuries and the "interior nearly all to 1859".

When Sudeley was habitable again, the brothers set about filling the castle with art and antiques, buying up a considerable part of Horace Walpole's collection during the Strawberry Hill House Sale of 1842, an auction that lasted 32 days. One report states that they furnished the home with "a remarkable antiquarian collection of furniture, glass and paintings that further fleshed out its history, including some very discerning purchases from the Strawberry Hill sale in 1842".

By 1855, both brothers had died and the castle was inherited by the Dent brothers' nephew, John Croucher Dent, and his wife, Emma, of the wealthy silk manufacturer family, the Brocklehursts of Macclesfield, who set about improving the castle and adding to its collections.

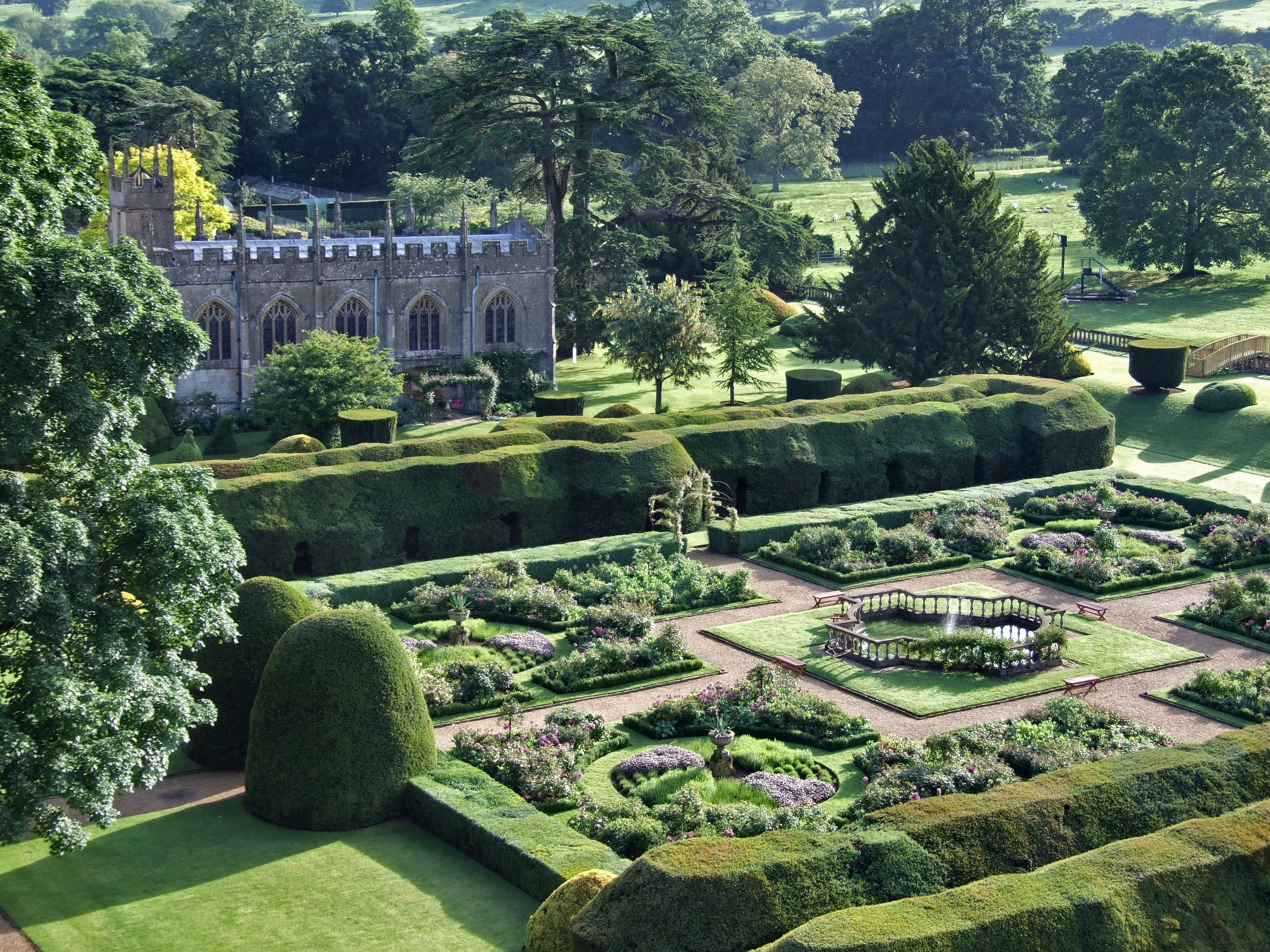
Queens' Garden

Emma entertained on a vast scale, throwing costume balls and soirees, often hosting more than 2,000 guests a year; she was also a prolific letter writer, a number of which survive in the castle collection, including ones from Florence Nightingale.

In 1859, Emma decided to attempt a re-creation of a historic garden. In 1885, she began to "substantially enlarge the house and its services ... she remodelled the western side of the castle through the full length of both courtyards, overbuilding one section of the ruins, and beginning a new tower at its north-east corner". In 1892, she built a "north lodge" on the property. She also arranged for Winchcombe to get its "first piped water supply in 1887".

After Henry Dent Brocklehurst and his wife Marion inherited the property in 1900, they redecorated. Thirty years later, their son, Jack, arranged to "reconfigure the eastern range of the building" and "the creation of a panelled library furnished with an Elizabethan fireplace". His wife Mary brought the "Walter Morrison fine picture collection" to the castle; the majority of pieces are still on site.

=== World War II and later on ===
By the start of the Second World War, Sudeley was in straitened circumstances, having suffered from the huge death duties that were levied on it upon the death of Henry Dent-Brocklehurst in 1932, forcing the family to sell off much of the land the castle relied upon for its upkeep.

During the war the castle was used as storage by the Tate Gallery as they moved their art out of London in an attempt to keep it safe during the Blitz.

Camp 37 was located where the visitors' car park is today, a prisoner of war (POW) camp for captured Italian and German soldiers. The POWs worked on local farms throughout the duration of the war until it was closed down on 20 January 1948.

Willy Reuter, who had been a German PoW at Sudeley Castle recounted:

While we were in this camp we had to work on several farms. On a Sunday bike tour I met Beryl Meese in Broadway. She lived in Redditch, Worcestershire (52 Sillins Avenue). We were good friends until my release. On a visit to England in 1998 with my wife, son and daughter-in-law, I was able to obtain Beryl's brother's telephone number from people who were living in Beryl's parents' old house. He told me that Beryl was on holiday in Canada—what a pity we missed her.

The American-born Elizabeth first came to Sudeley after her marriage to Mark Dent-Brocklehurst in 1962, and in the subsequent years set about preparing to open the castle up to the public, which they did to great celebration in May 1970. The castle website timeline states that in 1969 the castle was inherited by Mark and his American-born wife Elizabeth; the couple converted the property into a tourist attraction.

Mark died in 1972, leaving Elizabeth, Lady Ashcombe to manage Sudeley on her own, and the castle had to survive its third round of heavy death duties in under 50 years.. In 1973 she recruited professional management to assist continuing the development of the property as a tourist attraction.

Elizabeth, Lady Ashcombe married Henry Cubitt, 4th Baron Ashcombe and uncle of Queen Camilla in 1979. They decided to keep Sudeley open to the public as a historic attraction and set about a major restoration of the castle. Lord Ashcombe died in 2013.

The Sudeley website states that in 1979, Elizabeth (Lady Ashcombe, by that time) and her children Henry and Mollie Dent-Brocklehurst "took over management of the visitor attraction".

BBC Four featured an investigation into the castle on 27 June 2007 titled Crisis at the Castle. This detailed the turmoil associated with managing the castle by the three members of the Dent-Brocklehurst family. Closing the castle to the general public on some weekdays meant that visitors were disheartened when embarking on their day trips, and resulted in a dramatic fall in visitor numbers in the three years leading up to the creation of the programme.

News reports in April 2008 stated that the family was selling a painting by J.M.W. Turner at auction because the attraction was "losing £100,000 a year" and required a restoration.

Sudeley held a re-enactment of the funeral of Catherine Parr in September 2012, with guidance from historian Dr David Starkey; the event received positive feedback from re-enactment societies.

== Recent history ==
Sudeley is operated by the family and remains the home of Elizabeth, Lady Ashcombe and "her son, daughter and their families" as of 2021. The family is committed to the continued preservation of the castle, its treasures and the ongoing restoration and regeneration of the gardens of Elizabeth, Lady Ashcombe, her children, Henry and Mollie Dent-Brocklehurst, and grandchildren. As of September 2019, BBC News referred to Lady Ashcombe as "the castle's owner".

The castle exhibitions were redesigned and relaunched in 2018 as "Royal Sudeley 1,000: Trials, Triumphs and Treasures", and is set in the 15th-century service wing, covering three floors. It takes visitors through the 1,000 years of Sudeley's history, highlighting important aspects of the castle's past, and exhibiting the historical artefacts and pieces of artwork in the collection.

The castle opens to the public seasonally and sections are used as a hotel, but it also remains a family home, with Elizabeth, Lady Ashcombe often called the "chatelaine of Sudeley". As of 2019, one of the tours of the castle included a visit to the "family's private apartments available daily from Spring to the end of October.

Sudeley has also been used as a wedding venue for some years. Several celebrity weddings have taken place at the castle, from Elizabeth Hurley's wedding in 2007, to Felicity Jones's wedding to Charles Guard in 2018.

In September 2019, thieves stole items from the castle's royal exhibition, including "rare keepsakes made from gold and precious stones and presented by King Edward VII to his last mistress".

== Gardens and parkland ==
Sudeley Castle sits at the heart of a 1,200-acre (490 ha) estate within the Cotswold valleys.

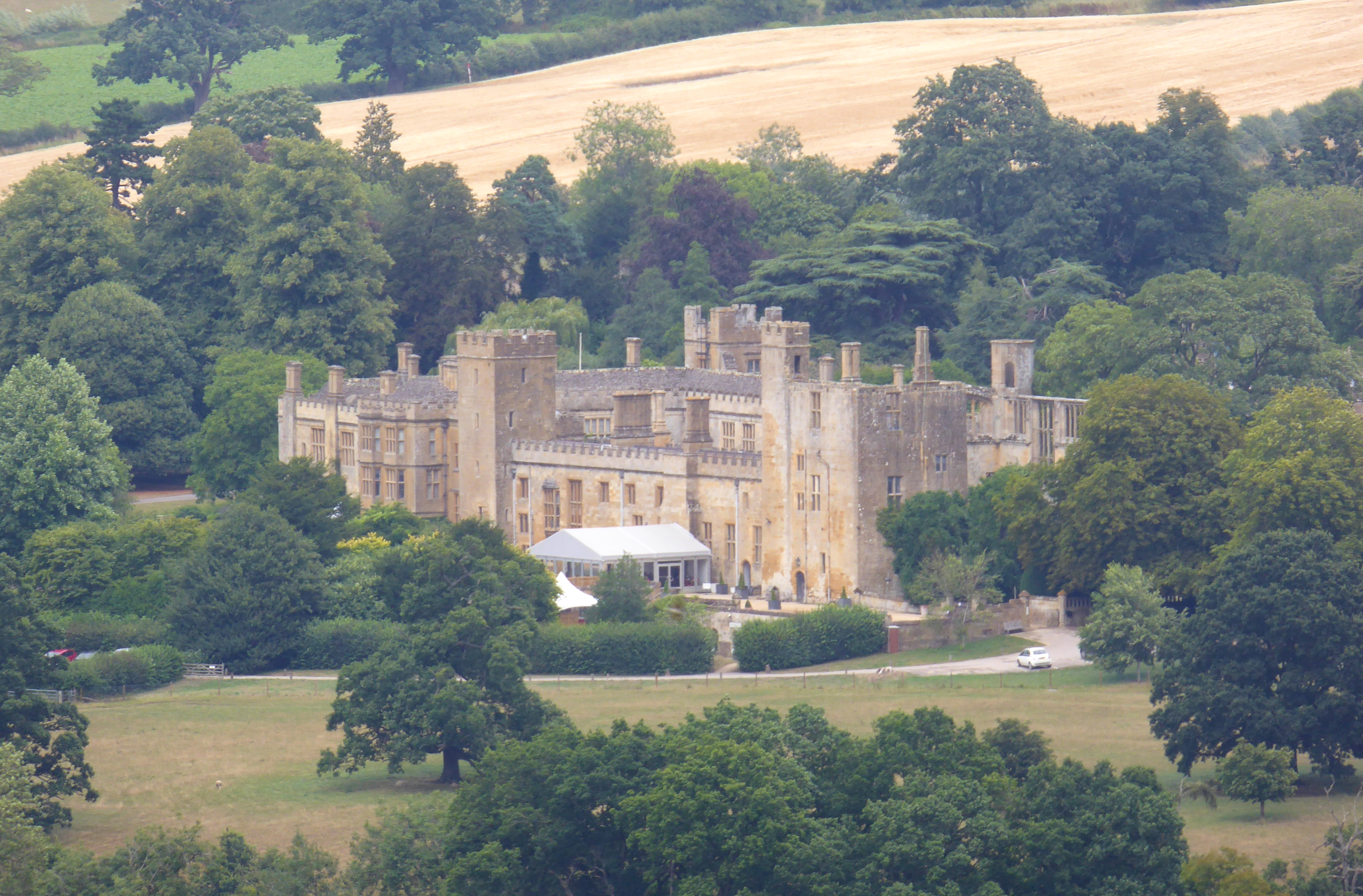
Sudeley Castle as visible from the Cotswold Way

The estate itself is made up of a mix of open pasture fields and woodland, and is crisscrossed by a number of public footpaths, most notably, the Cotswold Way, a 102-mile (164 km) long-distance footpath. These footpaths have connected Sudeley with other historic towns and monuments, such as Hailes Abbey, Broadway, Belas Knap and Stanway House.

The castle gardens cover some 15 acres (6.1 ha) and are available for the public to visit during the castle's open season.

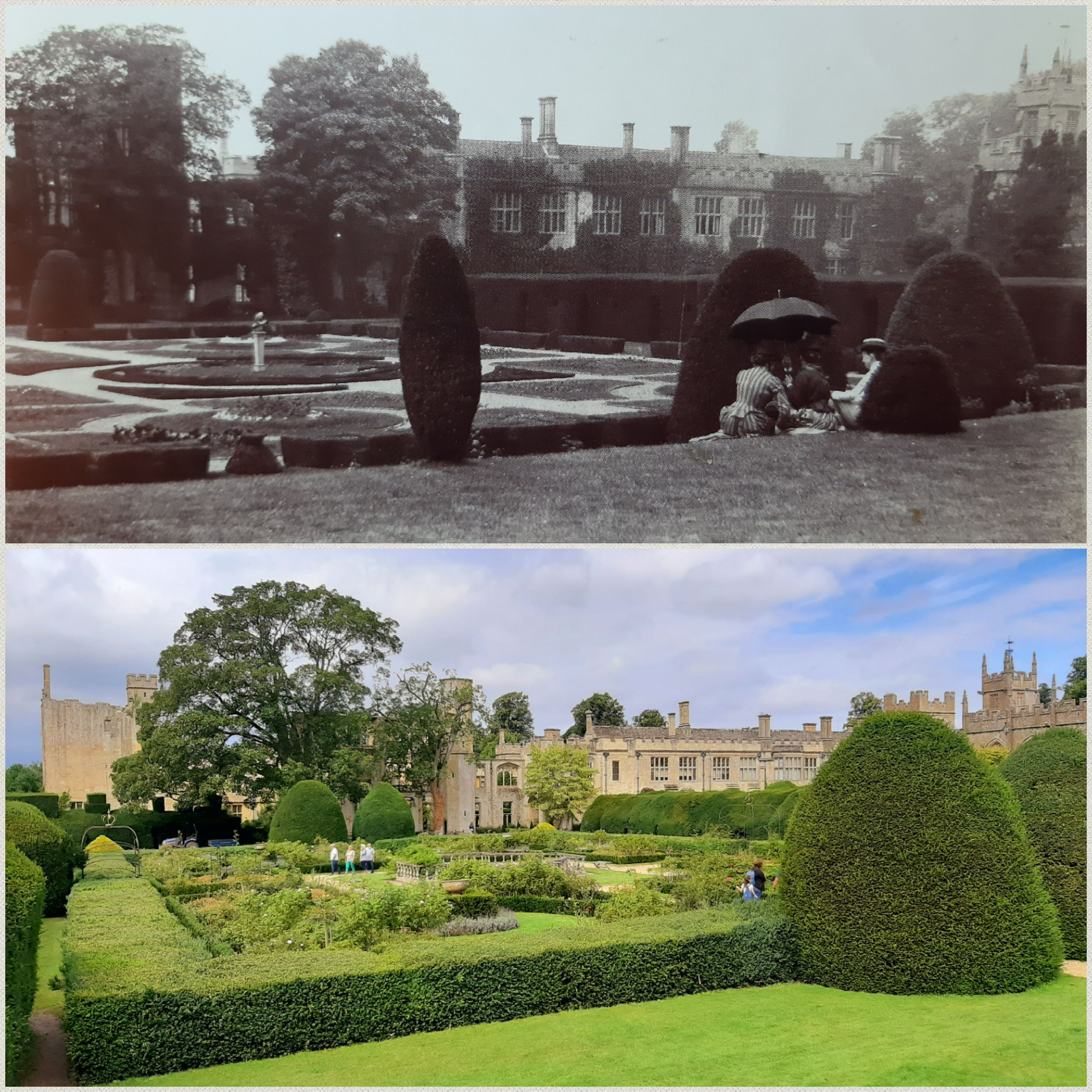
A comparison of the Queens' Garden in the Victorian Age and today

The garden is split into ten separate gardens, the centrepiece being the Queens' Garden. The Queens' Garden is the Victorian replanting of an original Elizabethan parterre garden that had been discovered in the same location, the large yew hedges surrounding it date back to 1860.

Celebrated rosarian Jane Fearnley-Whittingstall is responsible for the current rose display in the Queens' Garden, which is now home to over 80 different varieties of rose.

Another garden at Sudeley is The Knot Garden, made up of more than 1,200 box hedges, its intricate design drew inspiration from the pattern of the dress worn by Elizabeth I in An Allegory of the Tudor Succession, a painting that hangs in the castle.

St Mary's Church, in which Catherine Parr is buried, is bordered by the White Garden, which includes peonies, clematis, roses and tulips, where Catherine and her companion, Lady Jane Grey, would have entered the church for daily prayers.

Sudeley is also home to one of the largest public collections of endangered pheasants in the world, and works closely with the World Pheasant Association. The pheasantry which has been operating at the castle for over 30 years is part of a wider breeding program which has been set up in the hope of increasing the numbers of critically endangered birds before hopefully reintroducing them into their natural habitats.

== Tourist attractions ==
Sudeley Castle has been a tourist attraction since the early 18th century, drawing antiquarians, print makers and artists from across Britain. Some of the earliest of these being Samuel and Nathaniel Buck who visited and drew the castle in 1732 for their book Buck's Antiquities. The castle, as a romantic ruin, welcomed George III who visited in 1788 whilst taking the waters at Cheltenham Spa.

Today, Sudeley is one of the few remaining castles left in England that is still a private residence. The Dent-Brocklehurst family remain dedicated to making the castle and gardens as accessible as possible to the general public, opening it seasonally to visitors, albeit, with the private family quarters remaining largely closed.

=== Art collection ===
The bedrock of Sudeley's art collection was built upon the Strawberry Hill House Sale of 1842. It was one of the most impressive auctions of its day, lasting some 32 days, selling off the art collection of Horace Walpole, son of Robert Walpole, who is generally considered the first Prime Minister of Great Britain. The collection was added to throughout the Victorian age, and then again on the inheritance part of the art collection of Victorian businessman James Morrison of Basildon Park.

Not everything in the castle's collection neatly falls into the art category, with artefacts such as a prayer book and love letter belonging to Catherine Parr, weaponry, and the Bohun Book of Hours, one of only six of its kind to survive to the modern day.

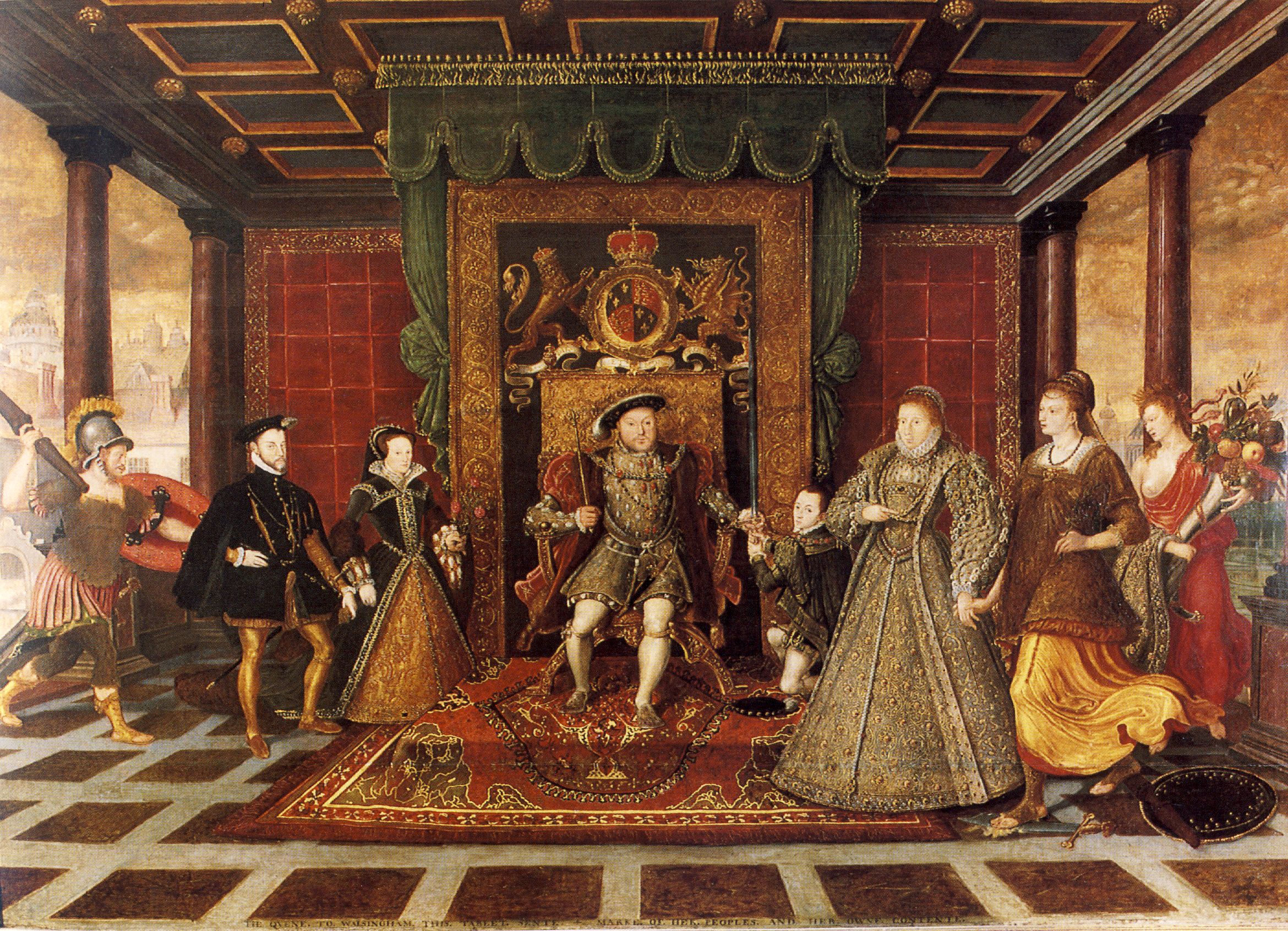
An Allegory of the Tudor Succession commissioned by Elizabeth I

Not all the art collection is on display to the public, with a selection of it in the exhibitions; the rest is kept in the family's private rooms. The castle does hold specialist art tours that takes small groups of visitors around the private quarters to view the art; however, these need to be booked in advance to ensure availability.

This is a selection of some of the art highlighted at the castle.

- An Allegory of the Tudor Succession Commissioned by Elizabeth I for her spymaster Sir Francis Walsingham and attributed to Lucas de Heere
- Rise of the River Stour at Stourhead by J. M. W. Turner. Dated to 1817 and exhibited at the Royal Academy of Arts in 1825; the Tate holds the preparatory sketches for this painting
- A Portrait of Peter Paul Rubens by Anthony van Dyck
- Flora by Bernardino Luini, painted circa 1515
- Miniature of King Henry VIII attributed to Lucas Horenbout
- Miniature of Queen Catherine Parr by Hans Holbein the Younger

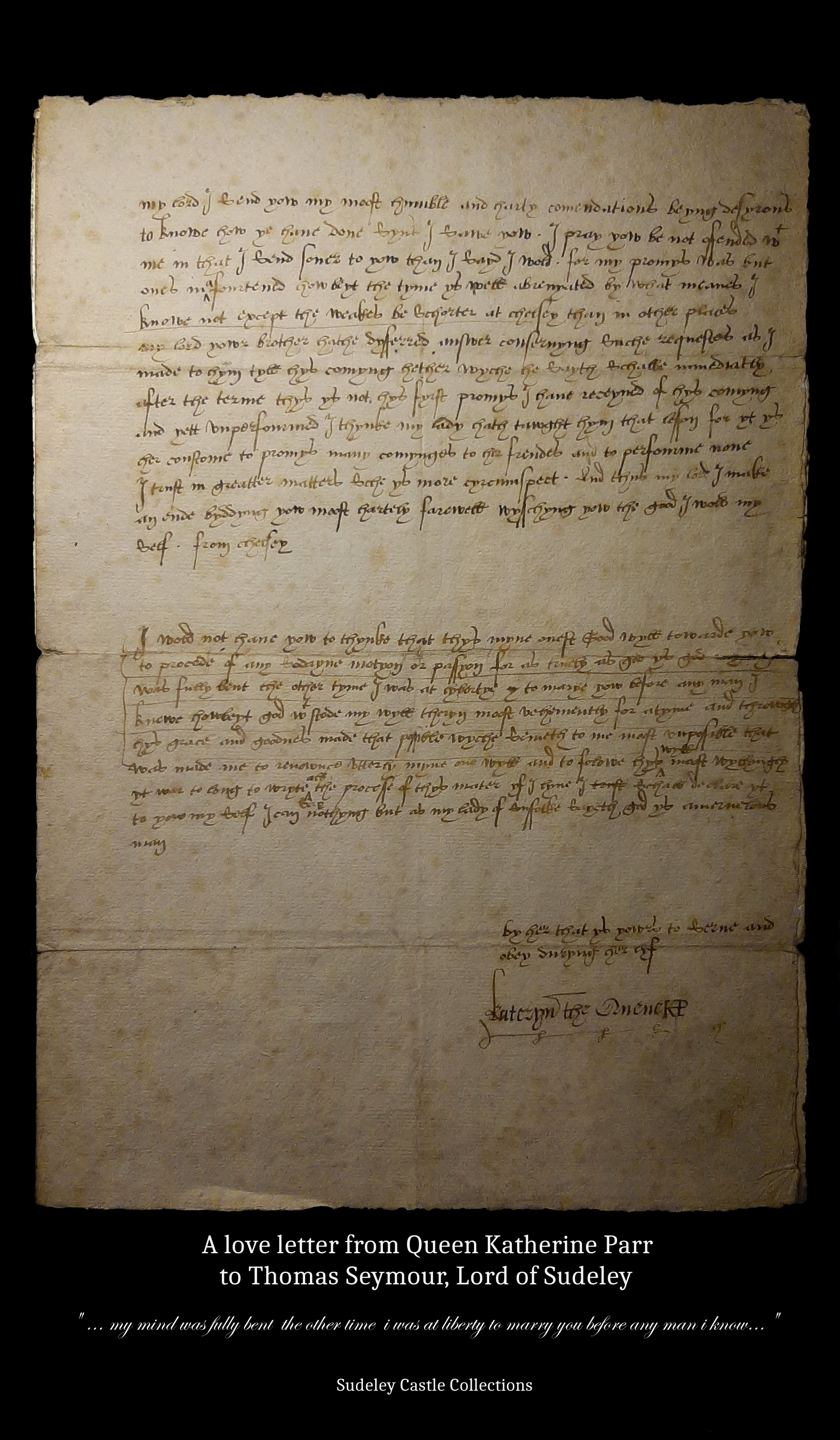
A letter from Catherine Parr to Thomas Seymour, in which she declares her love for him – on display at Sudeley

=== Textile collection ===
Sudeley Castle's textile collection was assembled by Emma Dent in the 19th century. It is considered one of the finest collections in the country and was, for a time, on loan to the Victoria and Albert Museum in London. Due to the delicacy of some of the pieces, a select part of it is on display at the castle in the exhibitions, while the rest is kept in protective storage.

This is a selection of some of the textiles highlighted at the castle:

- Louis XV Aubusson bed hangings, believed to have belonged to Marie Antoinette
- The Sudeley Stumpwork Box, dating to about 1660
- A waistcoat believed to have belonged to Charles I
- A 16th-century lace canopy, said to have been made by Anne Boleyn for the christening of Elizabeth I
- A fragment of cloth said to have come from the dress of Catherine Parr after the rediscovery and opening of her tomb in 1782
- Early 17th-century Sheldon Tapestry, woven in wool, silk and metal thread, with floral designs and biblical scenes. Parallels have been drawn between it and the Filioli Tapestry that was bought by J. P. Morgan in 1911 from Knole House.

== In popular culture ==
Sudeley is regarded by some as the model for Blandings Castle in the novels by P. G. Wodehouse. The adaptation for BBC television of Wodehouse's Heavy Weather (1995) was filmed there. The castle has been used as a location in other films and on television including:

- The Pallisers (1974)
- Beauty and the Beast (1976)
- Martin Chuzzlewit (1994)
- Tess of the D'Urbervilles (2008)
- Father Brown (2013)
- Antiques Road Trip (2015)
- The Great Chelsea Garden Challenge (2015)
- The White Princess (2017)
- An American Aristocrat's Guide to Great Estates (2020)
- The Spanish Princess (2020)

== Gallery ==
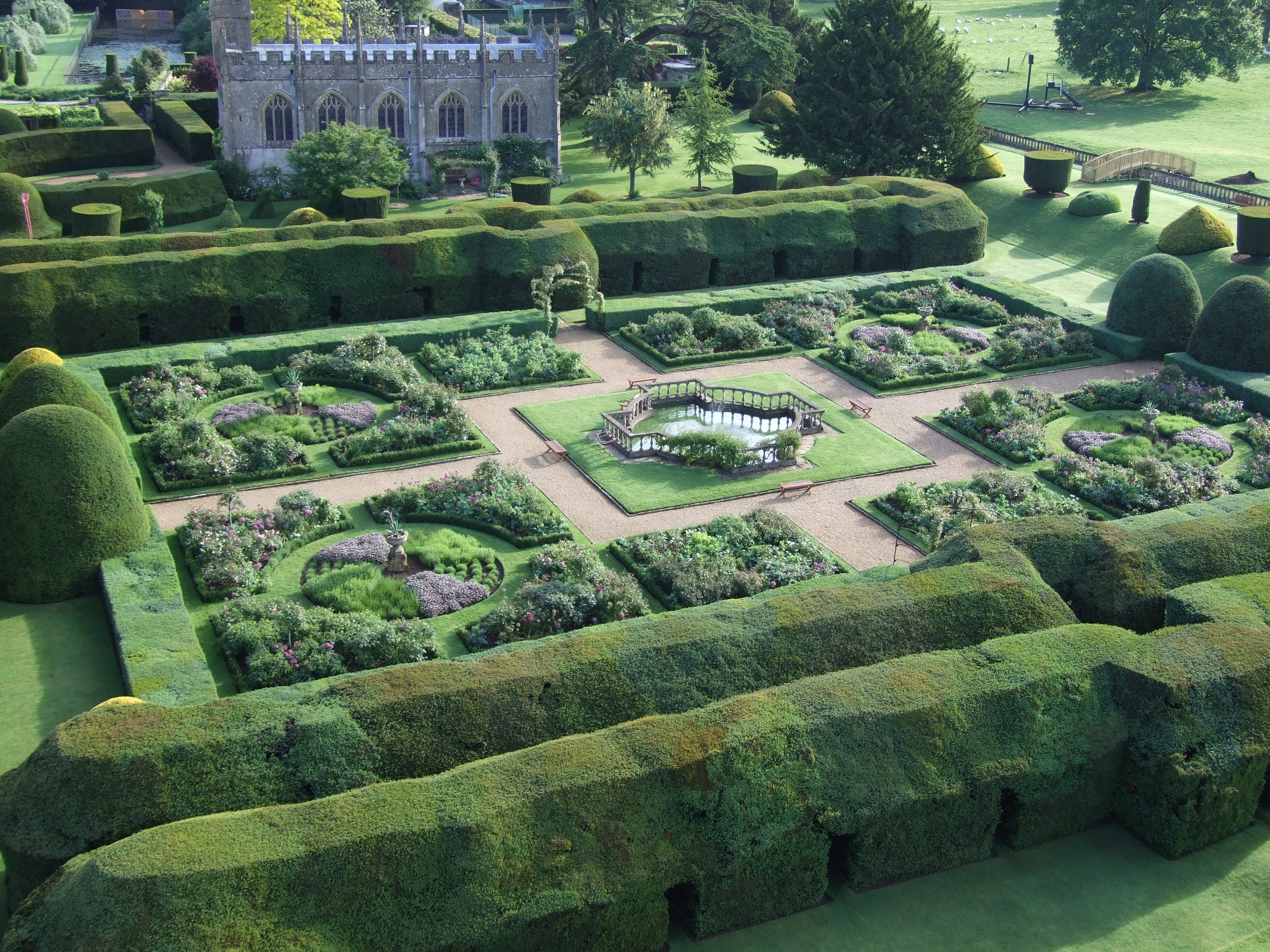
The Queens' Garden

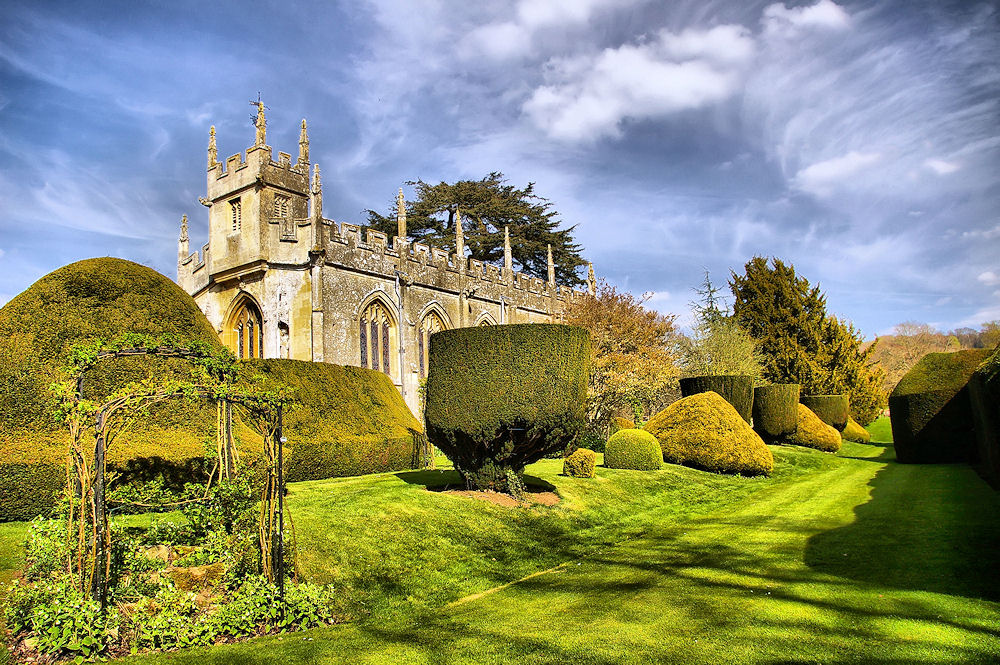
St. Mary's Church, Sudeley Castle

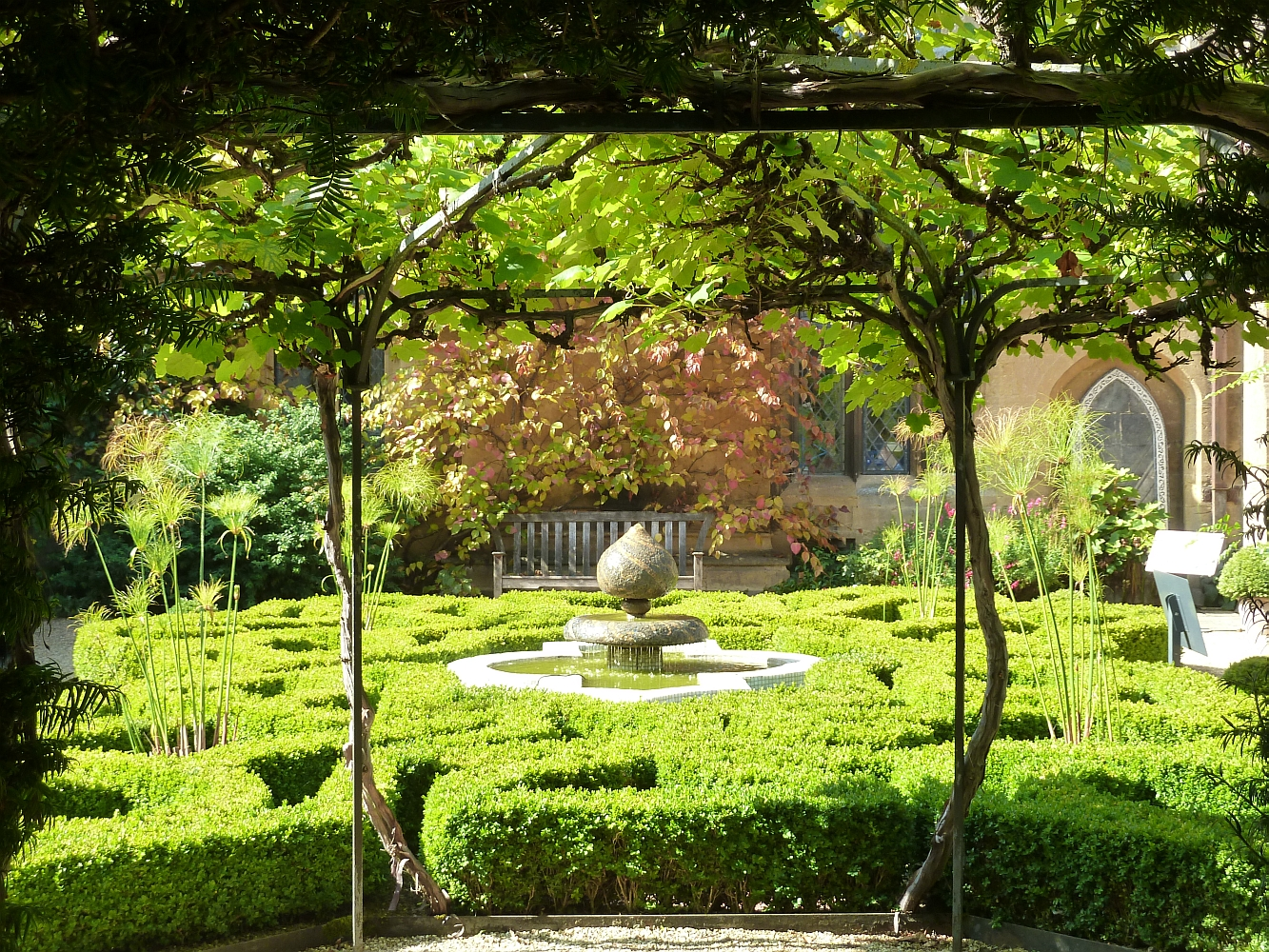
Knot Garden

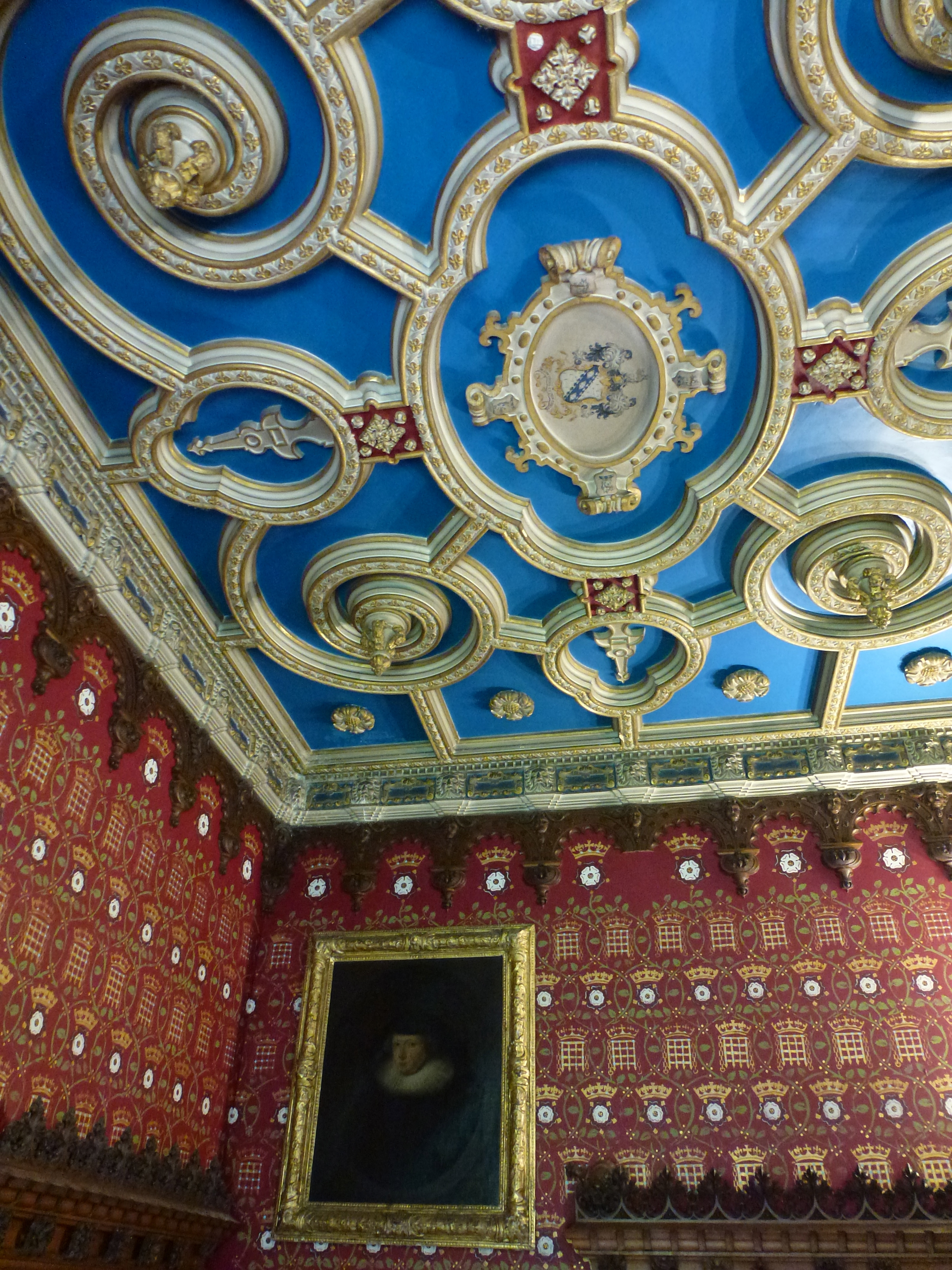
Catherine Parr antechamber

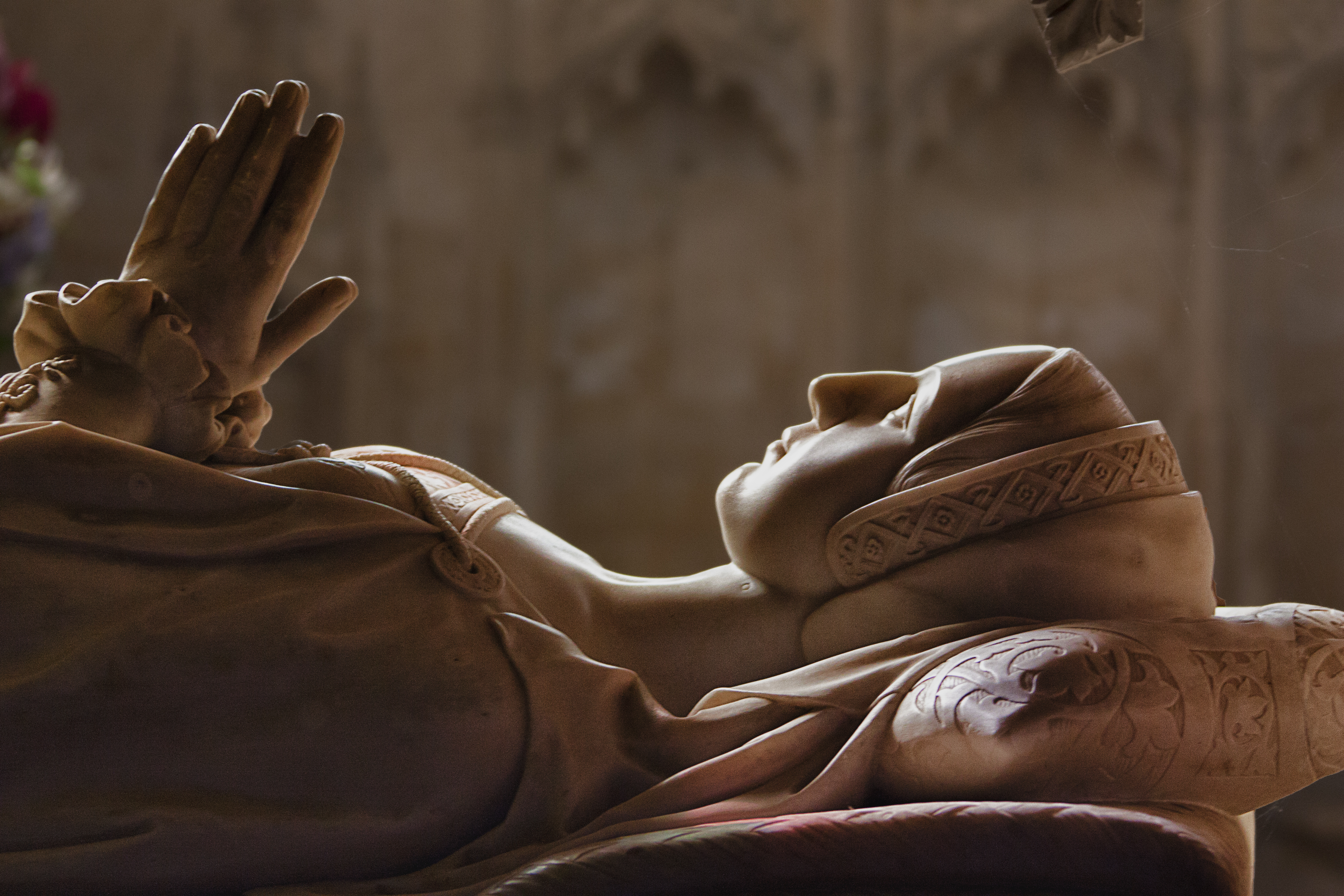
Catherine Parr's tomb

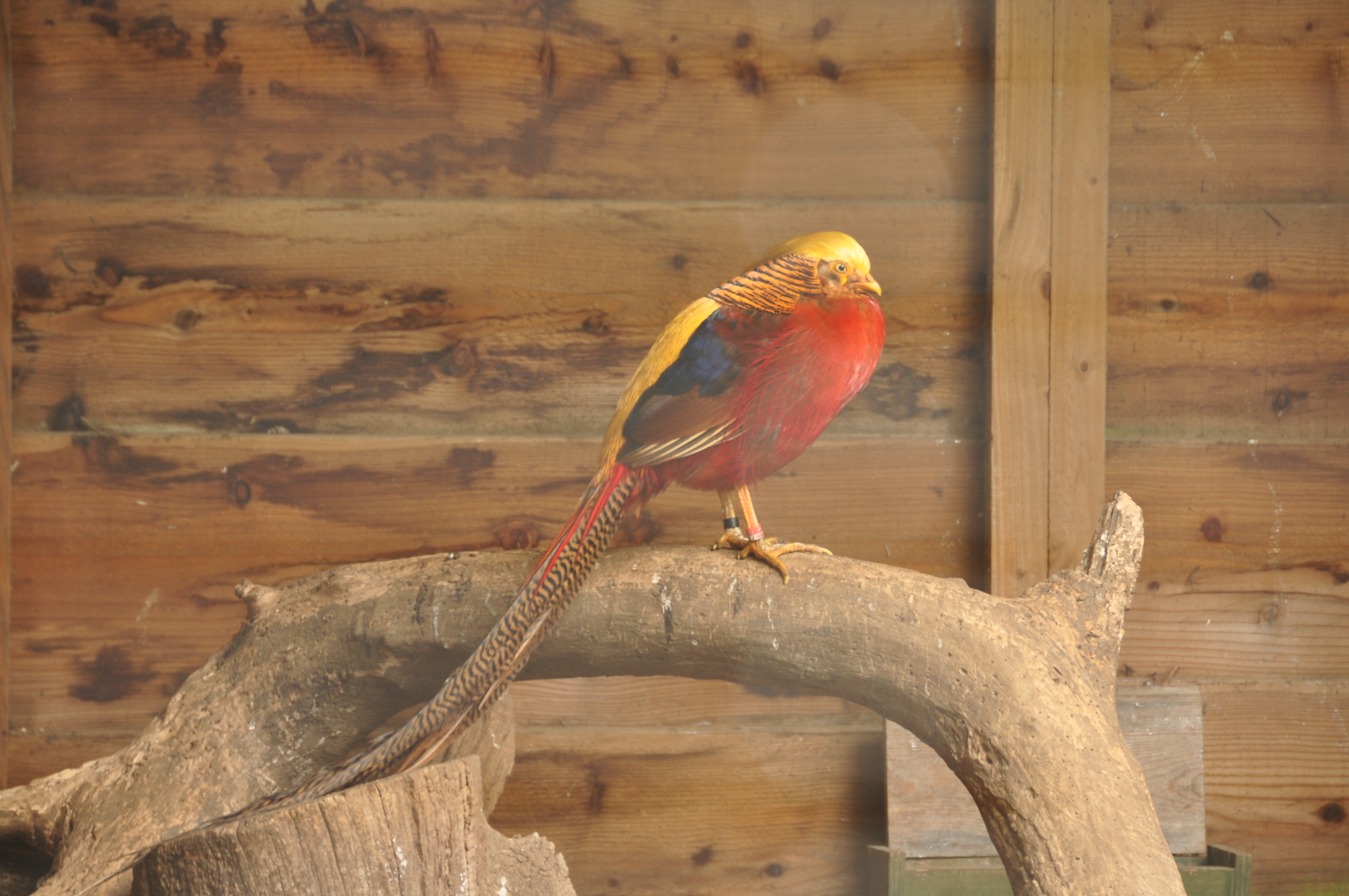
Sudeley Pheasantry

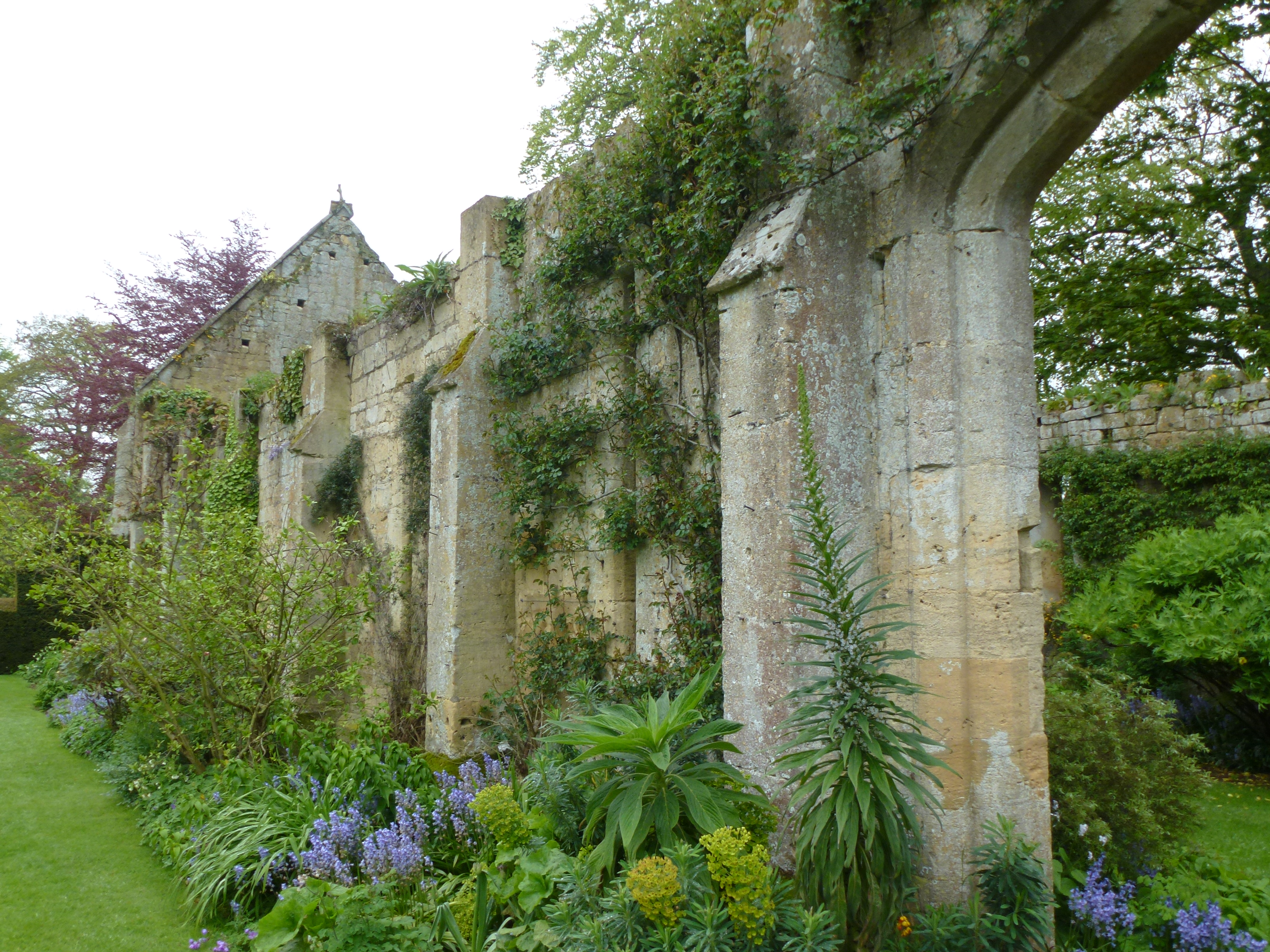
Tithe Barn

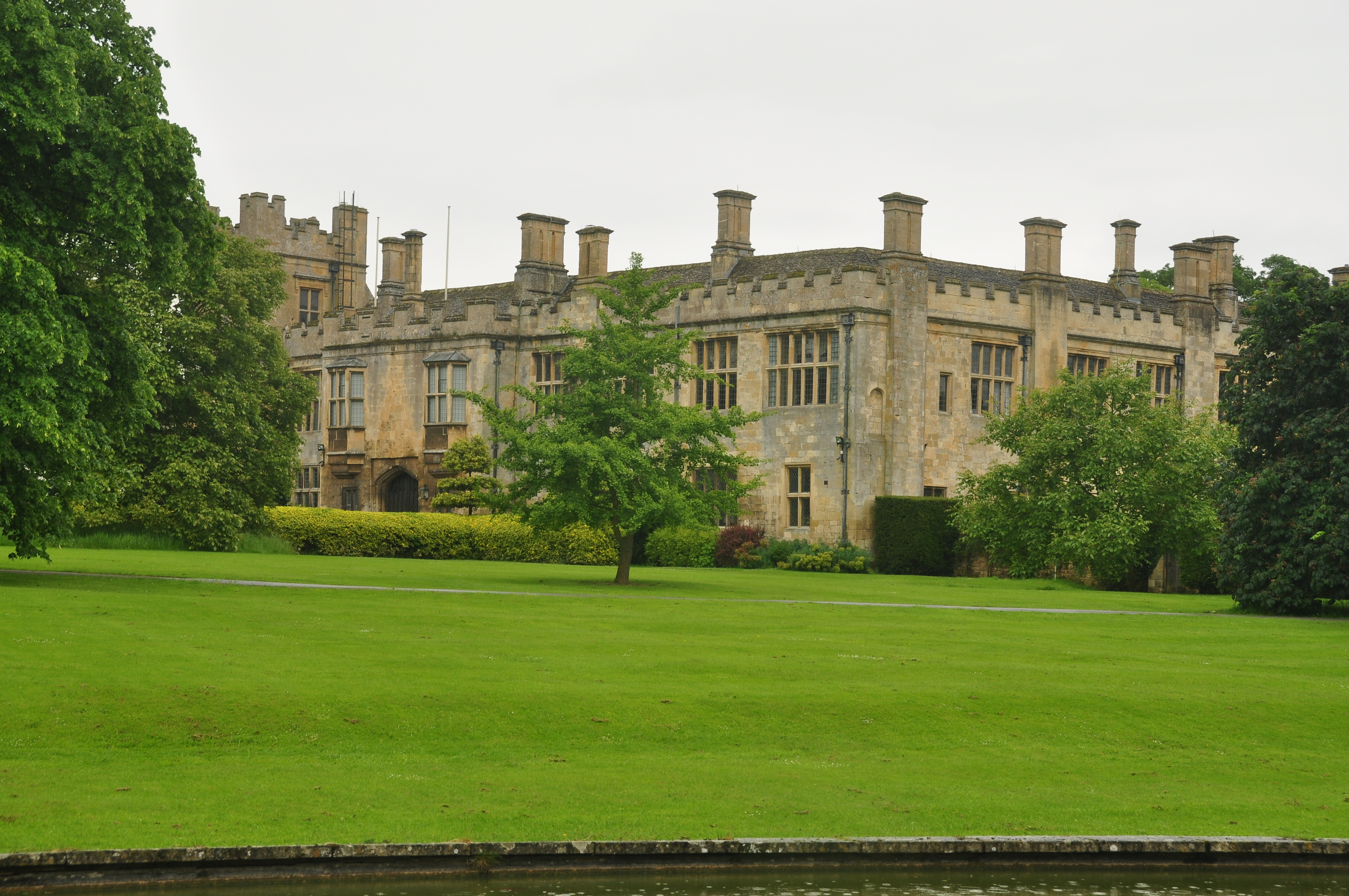
Northern Wing

== See also ==
- Louisa Pitt
- Castles in Great Britain and Ireland
- List of castles in England
