= Superblue (experiential art center) =

Superblue is a gallery featuring interactive and experiential art.

Following four years of planning, it was founded in 2019 by Mollie Dent-Brocklehurst, Laurene Powell-Jobs and Marc Glimcher to explore the role and place of digital art under the working title PaceX and was planned for Miami in 2020 but ultimately opened in 2021 following delays related to the COVID-19 pandemic. What differentiates Superblue from traditional museums and galleries is the focus on experimental and immersive art and an operational structure that emphasizes revenue sharing with the artists.

In New York City, Superblue's installation at the Starrett-Lehigh Building showcased the work of Jean-Michel Basquiat curated by his sisters and the Los Angeles location featured Glenn Kaino.

By late 2022, Glimcher and Powell-Jobs were no longer involved with the project. While its London, Los Angeles and New York City locations have closed, the Miami location opposite the Rubell Museum remains open as of 2023.
