= Uxbridge by-election =

Uxbridge by-election may refer to several elections to the UK parliament:

- 1915 Uxbridge by-election, following the death of Charles Mills in the First World War
- 1972 Uxbridge by-election, following the death of Charles Curran
- 1997 Uxbridge by-election, following the death of Michael Shersby a week after the general election
- 2023 Uxbridge and South Ruislip by-election, following the resignation of Boris Johnson
