= Sidney Job Pocock =

British Business man and writer

Sidney Pocock

Sir Sidney Job Pocock JP (20 September 1855 – 1931) was a British businessman, magistrate, writer, Liberal Party politician and an authority on prisons.

== Background ==
Pocock was born the son of Abraham Pocock and Lydia née Keevil of Stanford Park, Berkshire.

In 1890 he married Annie Cousens (d.1900). They had one son and three daughters.

In 1915 he married Kate Ethel Lankester (d.1925).

Pocock was knighted in 1912. On 28 April 1931 he died at Surbiton Hall, Kingston upon Thames, at the age of 76. His probate was resworn the next year at £20,034 (equivalent to about £1,800,000 in 2023). His columnar gravestone at Wimbledon is surmounted by a cornice and large shrouded urn or amphora.

== Professional career ==
Pocock inherited an interest in farming. He made his career as a businessman. He was prominent in the dairy industry. In 1907 he was appointed a Justice of the Peace for Middlesex and presided over the Spelthorne Petty Sessions. His experiences as a Magistrate led him to take a particular interest in the prison system. He visited many prisons, recording his observations and experiences which he had published in 1930, under the title 'The Prisoner and the Prison'.

== Political career ==
Pocock was a member of the Eighty Club, a political London gentlemen's club which had a strong association with the Liberal Party. He was Liberal candidate for the Uxbridge division of Middlesex at the 1906 General Election. Uxbridge was a safe Conservative seat, so much so that no Liberal candidate contested the previous general elections in 1895 and 1900. The Liberals swept to power nationally and the tide nearly took Pocock into parliament. He lost by just 145 votes. Four years later, at the January 1910 General Election, he once again contested Uxbridge but this time the Conservative won comfortably. Later that year, he switched constituencies and was Liberal candidate for the Devizes division of Wiltshire at the December 1910 General Election. Devizes was a better seat for the Liberals, they had won it in 1906. The Conservatives had won it back in January 1910. Pocock was unable to wrestle the seat back and the Conservative held on by just over 700 votes. He did not stand for parliament again.

=== Electoral record ===
General Election 1906: Uxbridge
Party	Candidate	Votes	%	±%
Conservative	Sir Frederick Dixon-Hartland	6,429	50.6	n/a
Liberal	Sidney Job Pocock	6,284	49.4	n/a
Majority		145	1.2	n/a
Turnout			79.8	n/a
Conservative hold		Swing	n/a	

General Election January 1910: Uxbridge
Party	Candidate	Votes	%	±%
Conservative	Hon. Charles Thomas Mills	10,116	65.2	+14.6
Liberal	Sidney Job Pocock	5,408	34.8	−14.6
Majority		4,708	30.4	+29.2
Turnout			88.0	+8.2
Conservative hold		Swing	+14.6	

General Election December 1910: Devizes
Party	Candidate	Votes	%	±%
Conservative	Basil Edward Peto	4,408	54.6	
Liberal	Sidney Job Pocock	3,670	45.4	
Majority		738	9.2	
Turnout			87.1	
Conservative hold		Swing		
