= Andy Slaughter =

British politician (born 1960)

Andy Slaughter KC MP
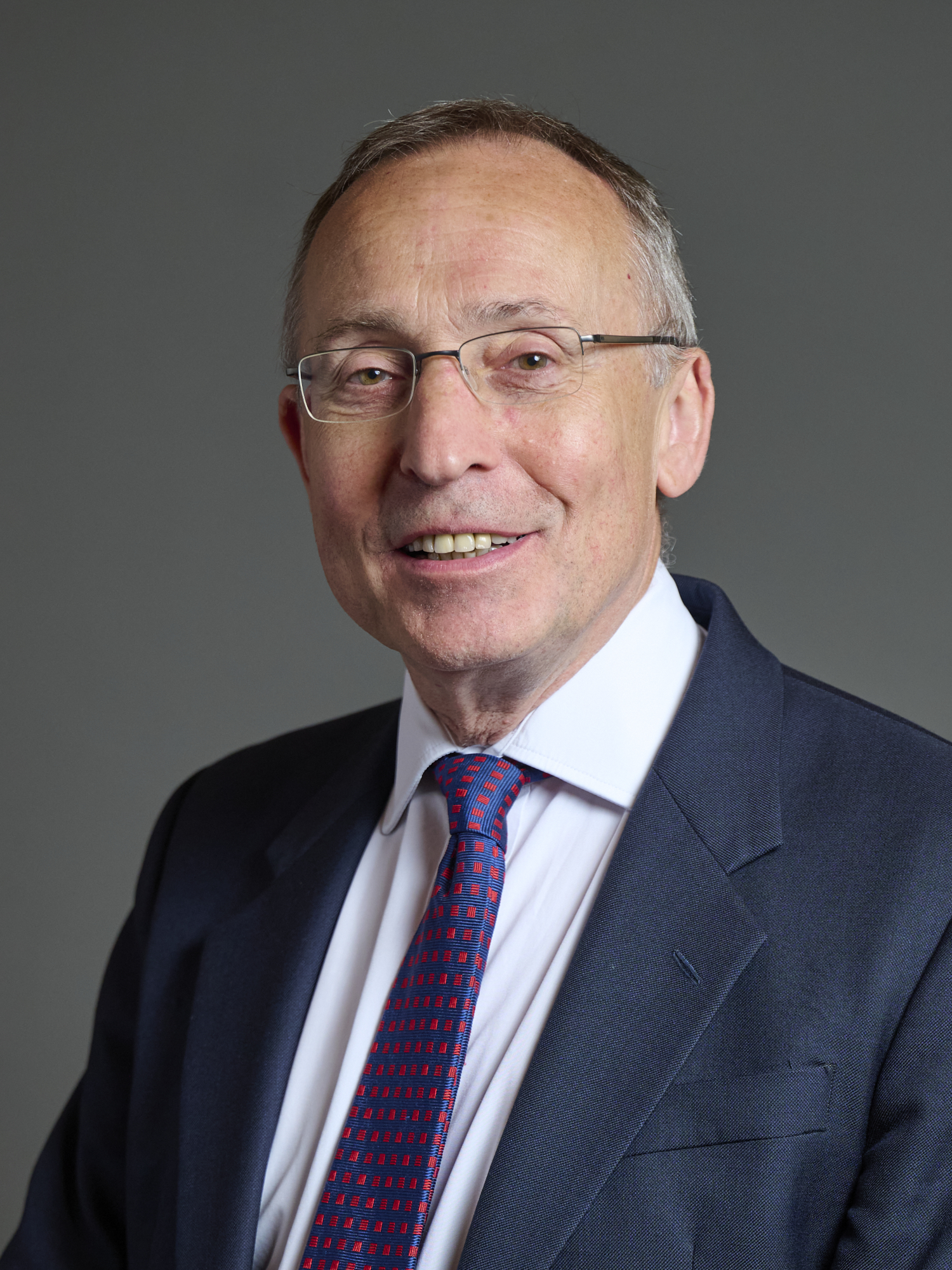
- Official portrait, 2024

Solicitor General for England and Wales
- Incumbent
- Assumed office 21 July 2026
- Prime Minister: Andy Burnham
- Preceded by: Ellie Reeves

Chair of the Justice Select Committee
- In office 11 September 2024 – 21 July 2026
- Preceded by: Bob Neill
- Succeeded by: Catherine Atkinson

Member of Parliament for Hammersmith and Chiswick Ealing, Acton and Shepherd's Bush (2005–2010) Hammersmith (2010–2024)
- Incumbent
- Assumed office 5 May 2005
- Preceded by: Clive Soley
- Majority: 15,290 (33.2%)
Shadow portfolios
2021–2023	Solicitor General
2021–2021	Legal Aid
2016–2017	Housing
2010–2016	Justice

Personal details
- Born: Andrew Francis Slaughter; 29 September 1960 (age 66) Hammersmith, London, England
- Party: Labour
- Education: University of Exeter (LLB)
- Website: andyslaughter.co.uk

Andrew Francis Slaughter (born 29 September 1960) is a British politician who has served as Solicitor General for England and Wales since 2026. A member of the Labour Party, he has been the Member of Parliament (MP) for Hammersmith and Chiswick, formerly, Hammersmith and Ealing, Acton and Shepherd's Bush, since 2005.

Prior to his election to Parliament, he had served as Leader of the London Borough of Hammersmith and Fulham Council. At the 2024 general election, Slaughter successfully stood in the new seat of Hammersmith and Chiswick.

== Early life and education ==
Slaughter was born on 29 September 1960. He was educated at the Latymer Upper School, before studying at the University of Exeter, College of Law, and the Inns of Court School of Law.

== Legal career ==
Slaughter was called to the bar at Middle Temple in 1993, thereby qualifying to practice as a barrister. He was a barrister with Bridewell Chambers from 1993 to 2006, before joining Lamb Chambers in 2006.

== Parliamentary career ==
He stood at the Uxbridge by-election in July 1997, following the unexpected death seven days after the 1997 general election of incumbent Sir Michael Shersby. The seat, which had a small Conservative majority, was held for the Conservatives by John Randall.

At the 2005 general election, Slaughter was elected as the member of parliament for Ealing, Acton and Shepherd's Bush in London, retaining the seat for Labour following the retirement of his predecessor, Clive Soley.

Slaughter is currently a member of the Justice Select Committee. He was a member of the Communities and Local Government Select Committee in 2009–10 and in 2010 of the London Regional Select Committee and Joint Committee on Human Rights. Slaughter was a member of the Regulatory Reform Committee from 2005 to 2007, the Children, Schools and Families Committee from 2007 to 2009, and the Communities and Local Government Committee from 2009 to 2010.

The Ealing, Acton and Shepherd's Bush constituency underwent a boundary change for the 2010 general election, and on 30 November 2006, the new Hammersmith Constituency Labour Party selected Slaughter as the Labour candidate for the new Hammersmith seat which he won in the 2010 general election with an increased majority.

On 11 September 2024, Slaughter was elected Chair of the Justice Committee by vote in the House of Commons.

=== In government ===
He was appointed Parliamentary private secretary (PPS) to Stephen Ladyman MP, Minister of State for the Department for Transport and served from November 2005 to June 2007. In June 2007, he was appointed PPS to Lord Malloch-Brown, Minister of State at the Foreign, Commonwealth and Development Office, and also served as PPS to Digby, Lord Jones, Minister of State at the Foreign, Commonwealth and Development Office and Department for Business, Enterprise and Regulatory Reform, and between July 2007 and October 2008.

Slaughter also campaigned against the expansion of Heathrow Airport during his time in Government. On 27 January 2009, he resigned his PPS role as he opposed the Government's plans for a third runway at Heathrow.

=== In opposition ===
In October 2010, Slaughter was invited to join the Labour frontbench as Shadow Justice Minister. Slaughter served as the lead shadow minister opposing the Legal Aid, Sentencing and Punishment of Offenders Act 2012 and the Justice and Security Act 2012. He resigned in June 2016, citing concerns over Jeremy Corbyn's leadership. He supported Owen Smith in the 2016 Labour Party leadership election.

Slaughter was appointed as Shadow Minister for Housing in October 2016; however he was sacked from the frontbench in June 2017 after he voted in favour of an amendment to the Queen's Speech which called on the UK to remain in the European Single Market, in defiance of the Labour whip.

In the November 2021 British shadow cabinet reshuffle, he became the new Shadow Solicitor General.

On 15 November 2023, Slaughter voted for an SNP amendment to the King's Speech, demanding an immediate ceasefire in Gaza, contrary to the Labour Party's official stance to support HM Government line on the Gaza War. He was dismissed by Sir Keir Starmer from his position as Shadow Solicitor General.

=== Return to government ===
Slaughter was re-elected in the 2024 general election. In July 2026, he was appointed to the new government as Solicitor General for England and Wales by Andy Burnham.

On 24 September 2026, Slaughter was appointed a King's Counsel. On the opening of the Legal Year on 1 October 2026, Slaughter took the oath of both a Kings Counsel and the oath of office of the Solicitor General.

Parliament of the United Kingdom
Preceded by Clive Soley	Member of Parliament for Ealing, Acton and Shepherd's Bush; 2005–2010	Succeeded by Constituency abolished
Preceded by Constituency created	Member of Parliament for Hammersmith; 2010–present	Incumbent
Political offices
Preceded by Maria Eagle; Helen Jones; The Lord Bach	Shadow Minister for Justice; 2010–2016	Succeeded by Yasmin Qureshi
Preceded by John Healey	Shadow Minister of State for Housing; 2016–2017	Succeeded by Tony Lloyd
Preceded by Karl Turner	Shadow Minister for Legal Aid; 2021	Succeeded by Afzal Khan
Preceded by Ellie Reeves	Shadow Solicitor General for England and Wales; 2021–2023	Succeeded by Karl Turner
