= 1997 Uxbridge by-election =

Election in the United Kingdom

- 31 July 1997

Uxbridge parliamentary seat
- Turnout: 55.2% ▼17.1%
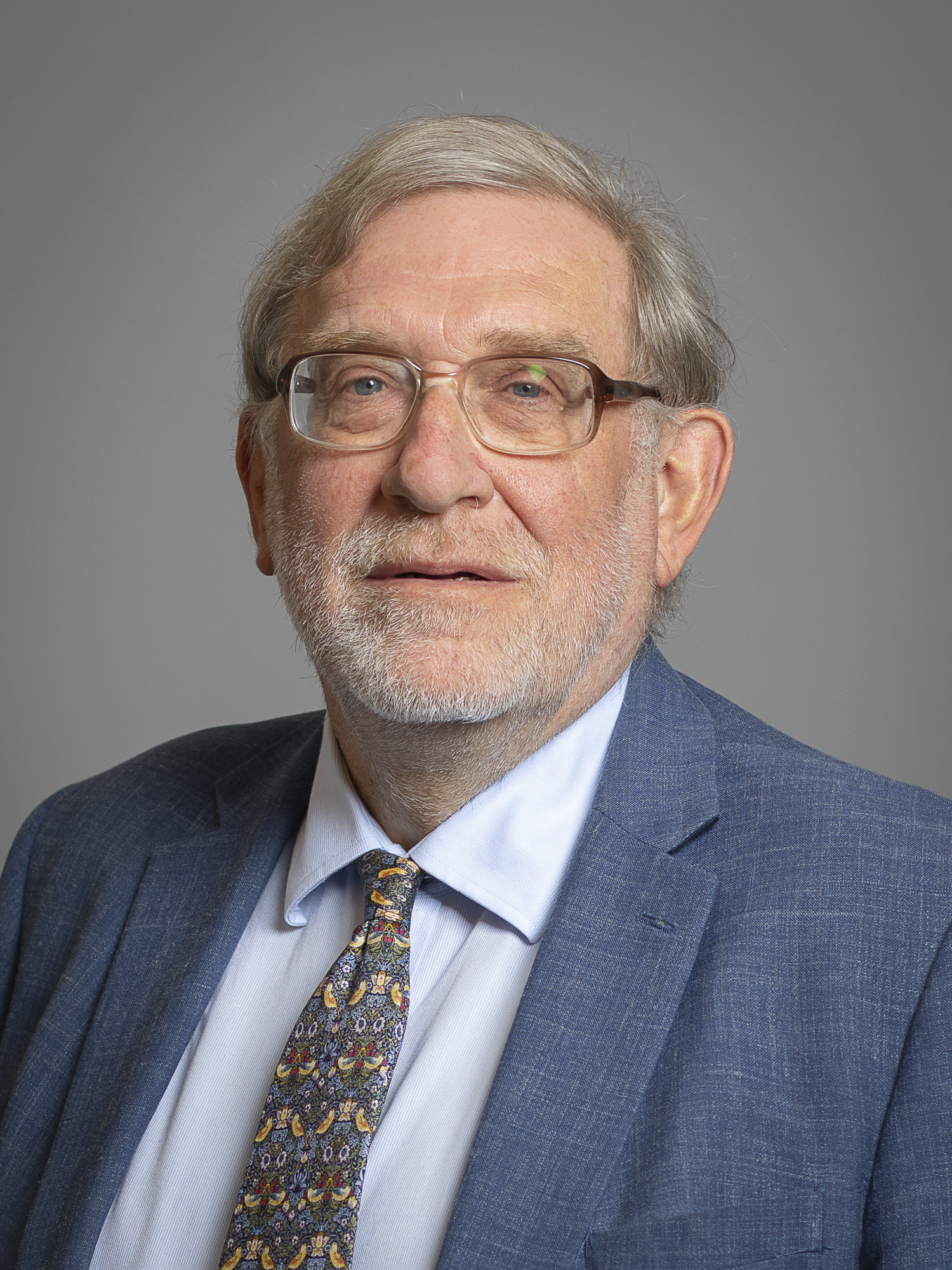

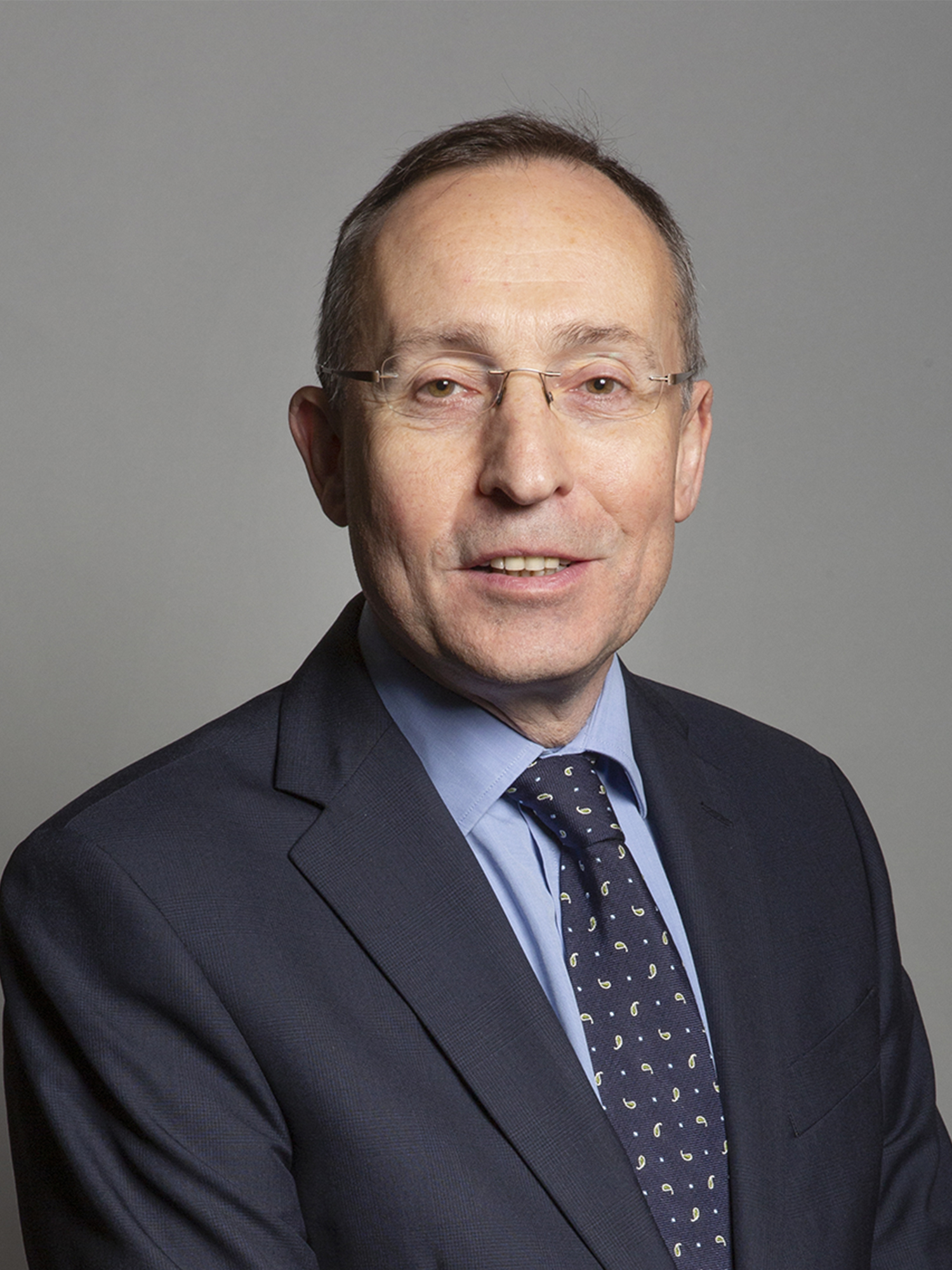

	First party	Second party	Third party
Candidate	John Randall	Andy Slaughter	Keith Kerr
Party	Conservative	Labour	Liberal Democrats
Popular vote	16,288	12,522	1,792
Percentage	51.1%	39.3%	5.6%
Swing	▲7.6%	▼2.5%	▼5.3%
MP before election
Michael Shersby
Conservative
Subsequent MP
John Randall
Conservative

A by-election for the United Kingdom parliamentary constituency of Uxbridge was held on 31 July 1997 following the death of incumbent Conservative Party Member of Parliament (MP) Michael Shersby. In their first by-election hold since 1989, John Randall held the seat for the Conservatives.

== Background ==
The vacancy was caused by the death of the Conservative MP Michael Shersby, who died unexpectedly on 8 May 1997, just seven days after his being returned to the House of Commons at the 1997 general election. Although that election saw the end of 18 years of Conservative rule as Labour won by a landslide, Shersby won a narrow victory over Labour Party candidate David Williams.

The by-election was called for Thursday, 31 July 1997 and was the first by-election of the 1997-2001 parliament.

== Candidates ==
David Williams, the Labour general election candidate was not placed on the by-election shortlist, which the BBC reported had "infuriated" some members. Activist Michael Shrimpton was also passed over, leading to his defection to the Conservatives. The Labour Party eventually chose Andy Slaughter, the Leader of Hammersmith and Fulham Council, over the Barrister Willie Bach from Nottinghamshire. The Conservative Party selected John Randall, the Managing Director of the century-old Randall's Furniture Store in Uxbridge. Keith Kerr, a senior executive with British Airways, represented the Liberal Democrats. Eight other candidates also stood, including perennial candidates Screaming Lord Sutch and Ronnie Carroll.

== Campaign ==
Labour's concentrated campaign included an unusual visit by Prime Minister Tony Blair. This was unusual in that a sitting prime minister does not normally campaign personally in by-elections for fear that a defeat may harm his own political standing. Conservative leader William Hague was the first leader of his party to campaign in a by-election for 20 years. The Conservative campaign was criticised by some members for keeping records of how much time would-be future parliamentary candidates had spent in the constituency.

== Result and aftermath ==
In the end, the Conservative candidate was elected by a large majority, gaining over 50% of all votes cast, while the Labour and Liberal Democrat votes both fell. It was the first time the Conservatives held onto a seat at a by-election since the 1989 Richmond by-election (when the candidate was William Hague - who had become leader of the party shortly before the Uxbridge by-election).

Randall represented the seat (and its successor, Uxbridge and South Ruislip) until standing down in 2015. Slaughter entered parliament eight years later, winning the seat of Ealing, Acton and Shepherds Bush in 2005. He has represented the Hammersmith constituency since 2010.

Uxbridge by-election, 1997
Party	Candidate	Votes	%	±%
Conservative	John Randall	16,288	51.1	+7.6
Labour	Andy Slaughter	12,522	39.3	–2.5
Liberal Democrats	Keith Kerr	1,792	5.6	–5.3
Monster Raving Loony	Screaming Lord Sutch	396	1.3	New
Socialist	Julia Leonard	259	0.8	–0.1
BNP	Frances Taylor	205	0.7	New
National Democrats	Ian Anderson	157	0.5	New
National Front	John McAuley	110	0.3	New
Independent Liberal	Henry Middleton	69	0.2	New
UKIP	James Feisenberger	39	0.1	New
Rainbow Dream Ticket	Ronnie Carroll	30	0.1	New
Majority		3,766	11.8	+10.1
Turnout		31,867	55.2	–16.9
Conservative hold		Swing	+5.1	

General election 1997: Uxbridge
Party	Candidate	Votes	%	±%
Conservative	Michael Shersby	18,095	43.5	−12.9
Labour	David Williams	17,371	41.8	+12.4
Liberal Democrats	Andrew Malyan	4,528	10.9	−1.2
Referendum	Garrick Aird	1,153	2.8	New
Socialist	Julia Leonard	398	1.0	New
Majority		724	1.7	−25.4
Turnout		41,545	72.3	−6.6
Conservative hold		Swing	-12.7	

== See also ==
- 2023 Uxbridge and South Ruislip by-election
- List of United Kingdom by-elections
