= Uxbridge (constituency) =

Parliamentary constituency in the United Kingdom, 1885–2010

Coordinates: 51.539°N 0.463°W

- Former borough constituency for the House of Commons
- Boundary of Uxbridge in Greater London for the 2005 general election
- County: Greater London
- Major settlements: Uxbridge

1885–2010
- Seats: One
- Created from: Middlesex
- Replaced by: Uxbridge and South Ruislip and Ruislip, Northwood and Pinner
- During its existence contributed to new seat(s) of: Spelthorne (1918) Southall (1945) Ruislip-Northwood and Hayes and Harlington (1950)

Uxbridge was a seat returning one Member of Parliament (MP) of the House of Commons of the UK Parliament from 1885 to 2010. Its MPs elected were: Conservative Party candidates for 107 years and Labour Party candidates for 18 years. The closing 40 years of the seat's history saw Conservative victory — in 1997 on a very marginal majority in relative terms.

The seat began with the market towns Uxbridge and Staines shedding the latter and its southern half in 1918; by 1945 more new seats were needed. Its eastern area merited Southall and the loss of Northolt to Ealing West (all new seats) and in 1950 of Ruislip, Northwood and Harefield to become Ruislip-Northwood and of Hayes and Harlington, taking up eastern territory and some of that lost in 1918. In each possible boundary reform the seat was reduced reflecting population expansion of areas outlying its core area of Uxbridge and interwoven Hillingdon, Cowley and Ickenham.

== Boundaries ==
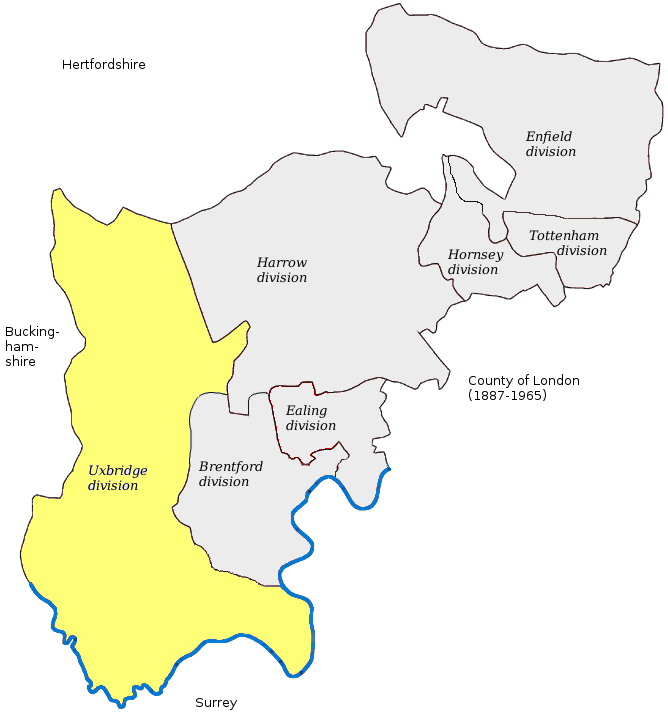
Original UK House of Commons seat Uxbridge created in 1885, before major reduction in 1918 and later reductions.

1885–1918: The constituency was created as the westernmost county division of the county of Middlesex. The Redistribution of Seats Act 1885 defined the seat as comprising the parishes of Ashford*, Bedfont, Cowley, Cranford, Feltham, Hampton, Hampton Wick, Hanworth, Harefield, Harlington, Harmondsworth, Hayes, Hillingdon East, Hillingdon West, Ickenham, Laleham*, Littleton*, Northolt, Ruislip, Shepperton*, Staines*, Stanwell*, Sunbury*, Teddington, Uxbridge, West Drayton, and Yiewsley. The shape of the seat was irregular and it stretched more than three times the maximum length than its final form and twice its breadth.

The parishes (as various successor urban districts) marked * were absorbed into Surrey and the others absorbed into Greater London, in 1965.

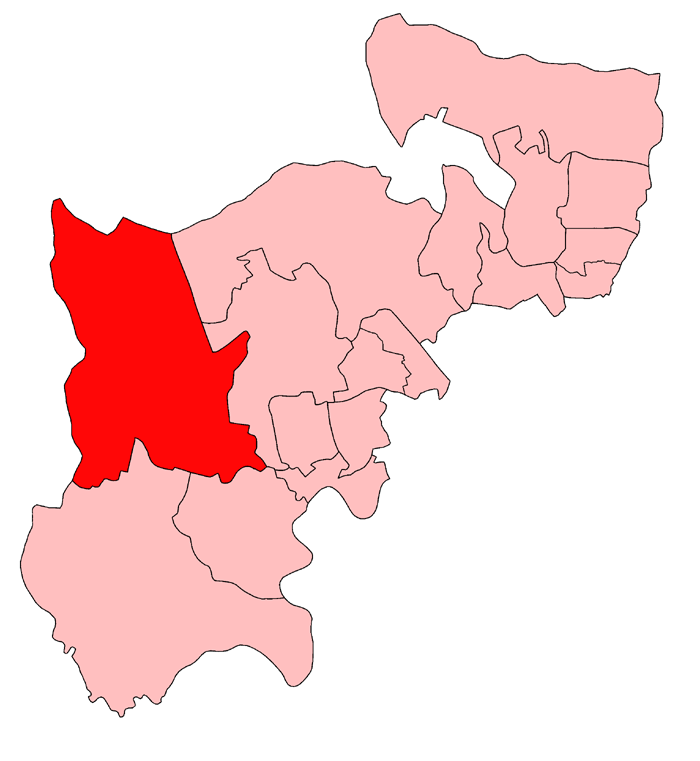
Uxbridge in the county of Middlesex, boundaries 1918-45

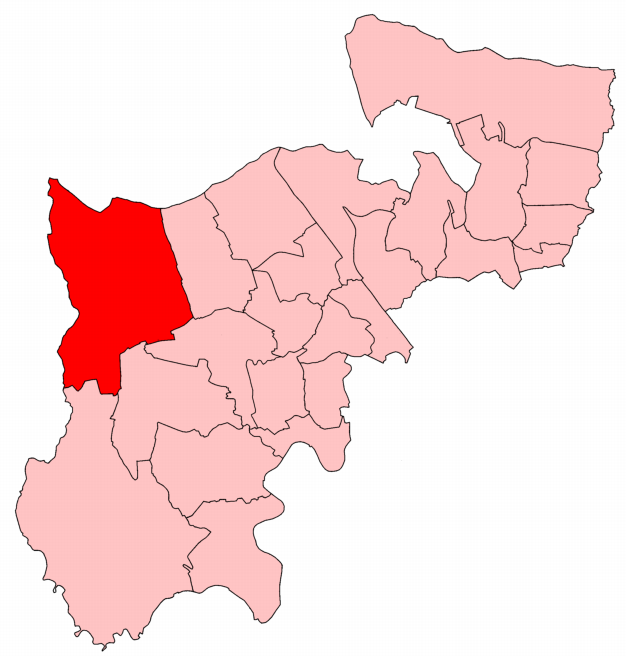
Uxbridge in the county of Middlesex, boundaries 1945-50

Map that gives each named seat and any constant electoral success for national (Westminster) elections for Middlesex, 1955 to 1974.

1918–1945: Uxbridge was cut down to a north-western division of Middlesex. Large areas to the south were removed to form Spelthorne (UK Parliament constituency).

The local government areas in the new Uxbridge seat were defined, by the Representation of the People Act 1918, as the urban districts of Hayes, Ruislip-Northwood, Southall-Norwood, Uxbridge, and Yiewsley as well as the Uxbridge Rural District.

1945–1950: included in 1945's interim redistribution of seats with more than 100,000 registered electors. Reduced to the urban districts of Ruislip-Northwood and Uxbridge. This saw contributions to two new seats: Southall, almost its whole; Ealing West, (as to Northolt); a cast-off for five years to Spelthorne of southerly Yiewsley and West Drayton Urban District.

1950–1974: Under 1950 redistribution, Ruislip-Northwood became a new seat in the north and north-east. Uxbridge with immediate neighbours north south and east (together forming the Municipal Borough of Uxbridge in 1955) was re-united with Yiewsley and West Drayton, to form the last incarnation of the county division.

1965 saw the last major Local Government reform. The area covered became part of the London Borough of Hillingdon.

1974–1983: The seat was reclassified as a borough constituency. Its wards were Colham-Cowley, Harefield, Hillingdon East, Hillingdon West, Ickenham, Uxbridge, and Yiewsley.

1983–1997: ward names were changed to: Colham, Cowley, Harefield, Hillingdon East, Hillingdon North, Hillingdon West, Ickenham, Uxbridge North, Uxbridge South, West Drayton, and Yiewsley. Their coverage remained unchanged.

1997–2010: Harefield ward was transferred to Ruislip-Northwood.

=== Boundary review ===
Following their review of parliamentary representation in North London, the Boundary Commission for England created a new constituency of Uxbridge and South Ruislip.

A number of electoral wards in Hillingdon were moved into the new constituency of Ruislip, Northwood and Pinner

== Members of Parliament ==
Election	Member	Party	Notes
1885	Sir Frederick Dixon-Hartland, Bt	Conservative	Before 1892: Frederick Hartland
Jan 1910	Hon. Charles Mills	Conservative	Died on Western Front (World War I), Hulluch, France
1915 by-election	Hon. Arthur Mills	Unionist	Brother of above. Succeeded as Baron Hillingdon, 1919.
1918	Col. Sidney Peel	Unionist	
1922	Dennistoun Burney	Unionist	More often called Dennis Burney. Succeeded as a Baronet, 1929, year of his retirement from Parliament.
1929	Col. John Llewellin	Conservative	Elevated as a peer in 1945
1945	Frank Beswick	Labour	Elevated as a peer in 1964
1959	Charles Curran	Conservative	
1966	John Ryan	Labour	
1970	Charles Curran	Conservative	
1972 by-election	Michael Shersby	Conservative	Sir Michael Shersby from 1995. Died 7 days after re-election in 1997.
1997 by-election	John Randall	Conservative	Knighted in 2013; elevated as a peer in 2018.

== Election results ==
=== Elections in the 1880s ===
Dixon-Hartland

General election 1885: Uxbridge
Party	Candidate	Votes	%	±%
Conservative	Frederick Dixon-Hartland	5,093	66.1	
Liberal	James Pellatt Rickman	2,615	33.9	
Majority		2,478	32.2	
Turnout		7,708	77.8	
Registered electors		9,902		
Conservative win (new seat)				

General election 1886: Uxbridge
Party	Candidate	Votes	%	±%
Conservative	Frederick Dixon-Hartland	Unopposed		
Conservative hold				

=== Elections in the 1890s ===
General election 1892: Uxbridge
Party	Candidate	Votes	%	±%
Conservative	Frederick Dixon-Hartland	5,172	71.8	N/A
Liberal	Leslie Probyn	2,029	28.2	New
Majority		3,143	43.6	N/A
Turnout		7,201	61.3	N/A
Registered electors		11,739		
Conservative hold		Swing	N/A	

General election 1895: Uxbridge
Party	Candidate	Votes	%	±%
Conservative	Frederick Dixon-Hartland	Unopposed		
Conservative hold				

=== Elections in the 1900s ===
General election 1900: Uxbridge
Party	Candidate	Votes	%	±%
Conservative	Frederick Dixon-Hartland	Unopposed		
Conservative hold				

Pocock

General election 1906: Uxbridge
Party	Candidate	Votes	%	±%
Conservative	Frederick Dixon-Hartland	6,429	50.6	N/A
Liberal	Sidney Job Pocock	6,284	49.4	New
Majority		145	1.2	N/A
Turnout		12,713	79.8	N/A
Registered electors		15,936		
Conservative hold		Swing	N/A	

=== Elections in the 1910s ===
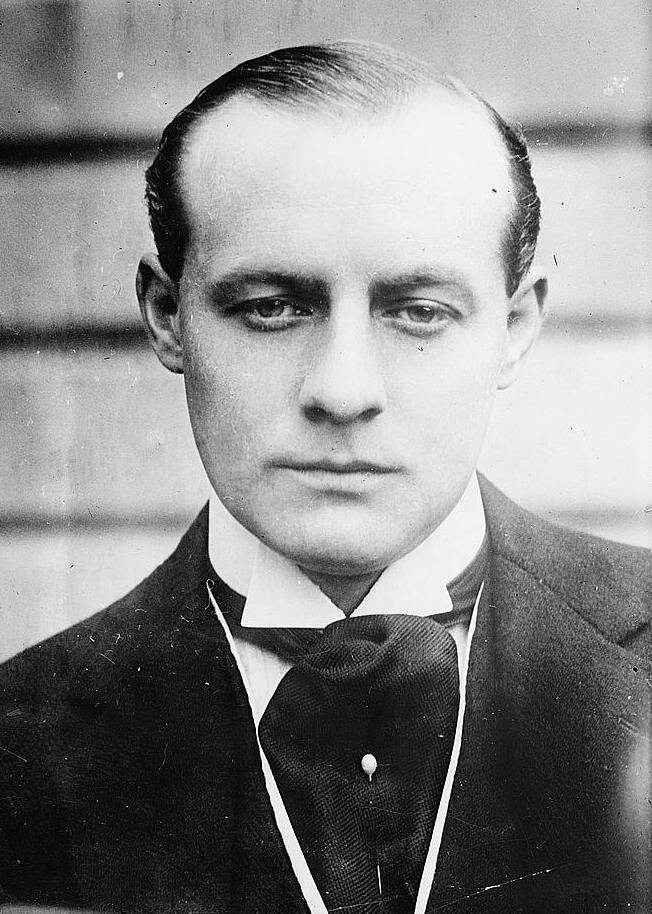
Mills

General election January 1910: Uxbridge
Party	Candidate	Votes	%	±%
Conservative	Charles Mills	10,116	65.2	+14.6
Liberal	Sidney Job Pocock	5,408	34.8	−14.6
Majority		4,708	30.4	+29.2
Turnout		15,524	88.0	+8.2
Conservative hold		Swing	+14.6	

General election December 1910: Uxbridge
Party	Candidate	Votes	%	±%
Conservative	Charles Mills	9,005	67.8	+2.6
Liberal	Manmath Chandra Mallik	4,286	32.2	−2.6
Majority		4,719	35.6	+5.2
Turnout		13,291	75.4	−12.6
Conservative hold		Swing	+2.6	

1915 Uxbridge by-election
Party	Candidate	Votes	%	±%
Unionist	Arthur Mills	Unopposed		
Unionist hold				

Harry Gosling

General election 1918: Uxbridge
Party	Candidate	Votes	%	±%
Unionist	*Sidney Peel	9,814	59.1	N/A
Labour	Harry Gosling	6,251	37.6	New
Liberal	Norman Mackenzie Snowball	545	3.3	New
Majority		3,563	21.5	N/A
Turnout		16,610	55.9	N/A
Unionist hold		Swing	N/A	

- endorsed by Coalition Government

=== Elections in the 1920s ===
General election 1922: Uxbridge
Party	Candidate	Votes	%	±%
Unionist	Dennistoun Burney	12,391	52.7	−6.4
Labour	William Brown	7,292	31.0	−5.6
National Liberal	F. S. Evans	3,844	16.3	+13.0
Majority		5,099	21.7	+0.2
Turnout		23,527	73.0	+17.1
Unionist hold		Swing		

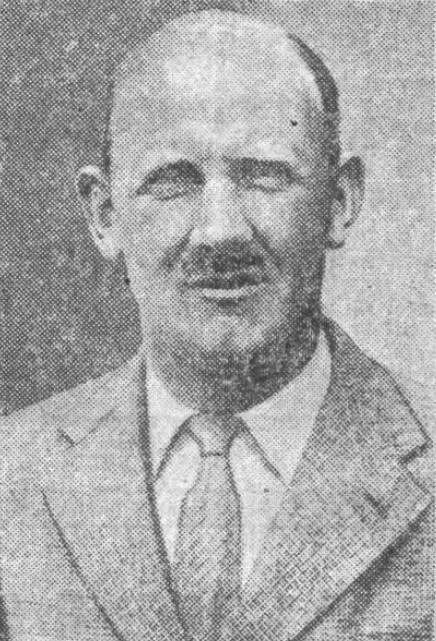
Hutchison

General election 1923: Uxbridge
Party	Candidate	Votes	%	±%
Unionist	Dennistoun Burney	9,254	40.6	−12.1
Liberal	Graham Seton Hutchison	7,423	32.5	+16.2
Labour	Robert Small	6,146	26.9	−4.1
Majority		1,831	8.1	−13.6
Turnout		22,823	66.6	−6.4
Unionist hold		Swing	-14.2	

General election 1924: Uxbridge
Party	Candidate	Votes	%	±%
Unionist	Dennistoun Burney	13,525	52.1	+11.5
Labour	Robert Small	8,459	32.6	+5.7
Liberal	John Stanley Griffith-Jones	3,976	15.3	−17.2
Majority		5,066	19.5	+11.4
Turnout		25,960	71.8	+5.2
Unionist hold		Swing		

General election 1929: Uxbridge
Party	Candidate	Votes	%	±%
Unionist	John Llewellin	17,770	41.2	−10.9
Labour	Reginald Bridgeman	16,422	38.2	+5.6
Liberal	Richard Christian Cecil James Binney	8,847	20.6	+5.3
Majority		1,348	3.0	−16.5
Turnout		43,039	72.2	+0.4
Unionist hold		Swing	-8.2	

=== Elections in the 1930s ===
General election 1931: Uxbridge
Party	Candidate	Votes	%	±%
Conservative	John Llewellin	35,836	71.96	+30.67
Labour	Lawrence M. Worsnop	11,609	23.31	−14.85
Workers	Reginald Bridgeman	2,358	4.73	New
Majority		24,227	48.65	+45.42
Turnout		49,803	68.36	−3.96
Conservative hold		Swing	+22.71	

General election 1935: Uxbridge
Party	Candidate	Votes	%	±%
Conservative	John Llewellin	34,727	54.06	−17.90
Labour	Lawrence M. Worsnop	24,000	37.36	+14.05
Liberal	William Ridgway	5,514	8.58	New
Majority		10,727	16.70	−31.95
Turnout		64,241	65.20	−3.16
Conservative hold		Swing	-15.97	

=== Election in the 1940s ===
General election 1945: Uxbridge
Party	Candidate	Votes	%	±%
Labour Co-op	Frank Beswick	25,190	43.74	+6.38
Conservative	John Llewellin	24,106	41.85	−12.21
Liberal	John Ernest Aylett	8,300	14.41	+5.83
Majority		1,084	1.89	N/A
Turnout		57,596	73.93	+8.73
Labour Co-op gain from Conservative		Swing	+9.29	

=== Elections in the 1950s ===
General election 1950: Uxbridge
Party	Candidate	Votes	%	±%
Labour Co-op	Frank Beswick	20,139	48.16	+4.42
Conservative	C.B. Thorne	17,741	42.43	+0.58
Liberal	John Ernest Aylett	3,933	9.41	−5.00
Majority		2,398	5.73	+3.84
Turnout		41,813	84.56	+1.92
Labour Co-op hold		Swing		

General election 1951: Uxbridge
Party	Candidate	Votes	%	±%
Labour Co-op	Frank Beswick	21,249	49.14	+0.98
Conservative	Charles Curran	19,701	45.56	+3.13
Liberal	Lucien Fior	2,289	5.29	−4.12
Majority		1,548	3.58	−2.15
Turnout		43,239	84.75	+0.19
Labour Co-op hold		Swing	-1.07	

General election 1955: Uxbridge
Party	Candidate	Votes	%	±%
Labour Co-op	Frank Beswick	22,244	51.00	+1.86
Conservative	Charles Curran	21,368	49.00	+3.44
Majority		876	2.00	−1.58
Turnout		43,612	81.71	−3.04
Labour Co-op hold		Swing	-1.79	

General election 1959: Uxbridge
Party	Candidate	Votes	%	±%
Conservative	Charles Curran	22,360	46.51	−2.49
Labour Co-op	Frank Beswick	20,970	43.62	−7.38
Liberal	Gordon Robert Goodall	4,746	9.87	New
Majority		1,390	2.89	N/A
Turnout		48,076	84.35	+2.63
Conservative gain from Labour Co-op		Swing	+2.45	

=== Elections in the 1960s ===
General election 1964: Uxbridge
Party	Candidate	Votes	%	±%
Conservative	Charles Curran	20,519	43.63	−2.88
Labour	Thomas J. Parker	19,866	42.24	−1.38
Liberal	Gordon Robert Goodall	6,644	14.13	+4.26
Majority		653	1.39	−1.50
Turnout		47,029	80.77	−3.69
Conservative hold		Swing	-0.75	

General election 1966: Uxbridge
Party	Candidate	Votes	%	±%
Labour	John Ryan	21,793	45.46	+3.22
Conservative	Charles Curran	20,903	43.61	−0.02
Liberal	Gordon Robert Goodall	5,241	10.93	−3.20
Majority		890	1.85	N/A
Turnout		47,937	82.55	+1.78
Labour gain from Conservative		Swing	+1.62	

=== Elections in the 1970s ===
General election 1970: Uxbridge
Party	Candidate	Votes	%	±%
Conservative	Charles Curran	23,414	49.35	+5.74
Labour	John Ryan	19,768	41.66	−3.80
Liberal	Gordon Robert Goodall	4,265	8.99	−1.94
Majority		3,646	7.68	N/A
Turnout		47,447	74.95	−7.60
Conservative gain from Labour		Swing	+4.77	

1972 Uxbridge by-election
Party	Candidate	Votes	%	±%
Conservative	Michael Shersby	14,178	42.31	−7.04
Labour	Manuela Sykes	13,000	38.79	−2.87
Liberal	Ian Stuart	3,650	10.89	+1.90
National Front	John Clifton	2,920	8.71	New
Union Movement	Dan Harmston	873	2.60	New
National Independence	Clare Macdonald	551	1.64	New
Democratic Conservative against the Common Market	Reginald Simmerson	341	1.02	New
Majority		1,178	3.52	−4.16
Turnout		35,513		
Conservative hold		Swing	-2.08	

General election February 1974: Uxbridge
Party	Candidate	Votes	%	±%
Conservative	Michael Shersby	20,542	42.08	−7.27
Labour	Manuela Sykes	18,127	37.13	−4.53
Liberal	J.S. Pincham	10,150	20.79	+11.80
Majority		2,415	4.95	−2.73
Turnout		48,819	82.48	+7.53
Conservative hold		Swing	-2.74	

General election October 1974: Uxbridge
Party	Candidate	Votes	%	±%
Conservative	Michael Shersby	19,969	44.51	+2.43
Labour	G.E. Pringle	17,816	39.71	+2.58
Liberal	J.S. Pincham	7,081	15.78	−5.01
Majority		2,153	4.80	−0.15
Turnout		44,866	75.09	−7.39
Conservative hold		Swing	-0.07	

General election 1979: Uxbridge
Party	Candidate	Votes	%	±%
Conservative	Michael Shersby	24,967	52.49	+7.98
Labour	George Pringle	16,972	35.68	−4.03
Liberal	Jonathan Hunt	5,031	10.58	−5.20
National Front	Penelope Budgen	595	1.25	New
Majority		7,995	16.81	+12.01
Turnout		47,565	78.86	+3.77
Conservative hold		Swing	+6.00	

=== Elections in the 1980s ===
General election 1983: Uxbridge
Party	Candidate	Votes	%	±%
Conservative	Michael Shersby	23,875	53.62	+1.13
SDP	Peter Russell	11,038	24.79	+14.21
Labour	Patrick Magee	9,611	21.59	−14.09
Majority		12,837	28.83	+12.02
Turnout		44,524	72.26	−6.60
Conservative hold		Swing	-6.54	

General election 1987: Uxbridge
Party	Candidate	Votes	%	±%
Conservative	Michael Shersby	27,292	56.47	+2.85
Labour	David Keys	11,322	23.43	+1.84
SDP	Anthony Goodman	9,164	18.96	−5.83
Green	Ian Flindall	549	1.14	New
Majority		15,970	33.04	+4.21
Turnout		48,327	76.52	+4.26
Conservative hold		Swing	+0.50	

=== Elections in the 1990s ===
General election 1992: Uxbridge
Party	Candidate	Votes	%	±%
Conservative	Michael Shersby	27,487	56.44	−0.03
Labour	Robert Evans	14,308	29.38	+5.95
Liberal Democrats	SJ Carey	5,900	12.11	−6.85
Green	Ian Flindall	538	1.10	−0.04
BNP	Michael O'Rourke	350	0.72	New
Natural Law	A Deans	120	0.25	New
Majority		13,179	27.06	−5.98
Turnout		48,703	78.88	+2.36
Conservative hold		Swing	–2.9	

General election 1997: Uxbridge
Party	Candidate	Votes	%	±%
Conservative	Michael Shersby	18,095	43.5	–12.9
Labour	David Williams	17,371	41.8	+12.4
Liberal Democrats	Andrew Malyan	4,528	10.9	–1.2
Referendum	Garrick Aird	1,153	2.8	New
Socialist	Julia Leonard	398	1.0	New
Majority		724	1.7	−25.4
Turnout		41,545	72.3	–6.6
Conservative hold		Swing	–12.7	

1997 Uxbridge by-election
Party	Candidate	Votes	%	±%
Conservative	John Randall	16,288	51.1	+7.6
Labour	Andy Slaughter	12,522	39.3	−2.5
Liberal Democrats	Keith Kerr	1,792	5.6	−5.3
Monster Raving Loony	Screaming Lord Sutch	396	1.3	New
Socialist	Julia Leonard	259	0.8	−0.1
BNP	Frances Taylor	205	0.7	New
National Democrats	Ian Anderson	157	0.5	New
National Front	John McAuley	110	0.3	New
Independent Liberal	Henry Middleton	69	0.2	New
UKIP	James Feisenberger	39	0.1	New
Rainbow Dream Ticket	Ronnie Carroll	30	0.1	New
Majority		3,766	11.8	+10.1
Turnout		31,867	55.2	−16.9
Conservative hold		Swing	+5.1	

=== Elections in the 2000s ===
General election 2001: Uxbridge
Party	Candidate	Votes	%	±%
Conservative	John Randall	15,751	47.1	+3.6
Labour	David Salisbury-Jones	13,653	40.9	−0.9
Liberal Democrats	Catherine Royce	3,426	10.3	−0.6
UKIP	Paul Cannons	588	1.8	New
Majority		2,098	6.2	+4.5
Turnout		33,418	57.5	−14.8
Conservative hold		Swing	+2.3	

General election 2005: Uxbridge
Party	Candidate	Votes	%	±%
Conservative	John Randall	16,840	49.0	+1.9
Labour	Roderick Dubrow-Marshall	10,669	31.0	−9.9
Liberal Democrats	Tariq Mahmood	4,544	13.2	+2.9
BNP	Cliff le May	763	2.2	New
Green	Stephen Young	725	2.1	New
UKIP	Robert Kerby	553	1.6	−0.2
National Front	Peter Shaw	284	0.8	New
Majority		6,171	18.0	+11.8
Turnout		34,378	59.4	+1.9
Conservative hold		Swing	+5.9	

== See also ==
- List of parliamentary constituencies in London
