= Manuela Sykes =

British politician

Audrey Manuela Penelope Heather Sykes (24 January 1925 – 19 September 2017) was a British Liberal Party politician who later joined the Labour Party.

== Background and early life ==
Born to Arthur Darrell Sykes and Baroness Manuela Ottilie Von Hundelshausen, she was the elder of two siblings: her younger brother being Peter Darrell Ivan. She was educated at Richmond County School for Girls and University College London. She served in the Women's Royal Naval Service during the Second World War. She worked as a lecturer, writer, and public relations adviser.

== Politics ==
Her introduction to politics came at University College London, where she was secretary of the students union. She was a student of international affairs. She was also Vice-president of the World Federation of Liberal and Radical Youth. Sykes was a member of the executive of the World Assembly of Youth. In 1953 she was a Liberal candidate for No.7 ward in the St Pancras Metropolitan Borough Council elections.

Sykes first stood for parliament as the Liberal candidate for Finchley at the 1955 general election. Finchley was a Conservative seat that the Liberals had not won since 1923 and had not come second in since 1935. The Liberal party in 1955 was electorally at its lowest point in its history. Despite this, Sykes managed to increase the Liberal vote and save her deposit.

General Election 1955: Finchley Electorate 70,757
Party	Candidate	Votes	%	±%
Conservative	John Frederick Ellenborough Crowder	30,233	54.6	−0.3
Labour	Terry R. Lancaster	17,408	31.4	−2.4
Liberal	Manuela Sykes	7,775	14.0	+2.7
Majority		12,825	23.1	
Turnout			78.3	
Conservative hold		Swing		

This performance brought her to the attention of the party nationally. When a by-election occurred in Ipswich she was chosen as the Liberal candidate. Ipswich was not promising territory for the Liberals who had not run a candidate at the two previous elections. However, the party wanted a good candidate as the by-election was expected to attract media attention as the former Liberal MP Dingle Foot was standing as the Labour candidate. She polled 21.4%, which was the highest Liberal percentage vote in Ipswich since 1929.

1957 Ipswich by-election
Party	Candidate	Votes	%	±%
Labour	Dingle Mackintosh Foot	26,898	45.8	−7.1
Conservative	John C. Cobbold	19,161	32.6	−14.5
Liberal	Manuela Sykes	12,587	21.4	n/a
Majority		7,737	13.19	+7.4
Turnout		27,405		
Labour hold		Swing	+3.7	

This result encouraged her to contest Ipswich again at the following general election rather than return to fight Finchley. She managed to improve slightly on her by-election vote share.

General election 1959: Ipswich (Electorate 77,633)
Party	Candidate	Votes	%	±%
Labour	Dingle Mackintosh Foot	25,858	41.1	−4.7
Conservative	John C. Cobbold	22,623	36.0	+3.4
Liberal	Manuela Sykes	14,359	22.8	+1.4
Majority		3,235	5.1	−8.1
Turnout		62,840	80.9	
Labour hold		Swing	-4.0	

She started to rise to prominence in the Liberal party nationally and was elected a member of the Liberal Party Council. She was then elected as a member of the Liberal Party National Executive. She took a particular interest in the situation in South Africa and was an executive member of the Anti-Apartheid Movement. With the Liberal party experiencing something of a mini-revival she contested Ipswich for a third time at the 1964 General Election. Although she again managed to increase the Liberal vote share, she was unable to make the same sort of advance the Liberals were making elsewhere;

General election 1964: Ipswich (Electorate 78,463)
Party	Candidate	Votes	%	±%
Labour	Dingle Mackintosh Foot	24,648	39.8	−1.3
Conservative	Trevor A. Hagger	22,216	35.8	−0.2
Liberal	Manuela Sykes	14,755	23.8	+1.0
National Democrat	Dr. David R. M. Brown	349	0.6	n/a
Majority		2,432	3.9	−1.2
Turnout			79.0	−1.9
Labour hold		Swing	-0.5	

For the 1966 general election, Sykes switched constituencies to contest the Cornish seat of Falmouth and Camborne. Although the seat was in a part of the country where the Liberals were much stronger, she was again starting from third place. With the Liberal vote dropping slightly across the country, Sykes experienced for the first time that same shift in support;

General election 1966: Falmouth and Camborne Electorate 55,323
Party	Candidate	Votes	%	±%
Labour	John Elliot Orr Dunwoody	21,394	46.8	+2.3
Conservative	Robert Thomas Boscawen	18,131	39.7	+2.1
Liberal	Manuela Sykes	6,144	13.5	−4.4
Majority		3,263	7.1	+0.2
Turnout			82.5	+4.9
Labour hold		Swing	+0.1	

She became disillusioned with the Liberal party but not much on policy grounds. Her only real difference came in her opposition to the Liberal policy of Britain joining the Common Market. In March 1967 she announced that she had left the Liberal party to join the Labour Party. She did not contest the 1970 general election. Two years later, she stood again as a candidate, but this time for the Labour party in Uxbridge. Labour were hoping to regain a seat they had lost to the Conservatives in 1970, and Sykes had her best chance of being elected to parliament. However, the swing of 2% she achieved was not enough to gain the seat.

1972 Uxbridge by-election
Party	Candidate	Votes	%	±%
Conservative	Michael Shersby	14,178	42.31	−7.04
Labour	Manuela Sykes	13,000	38.79	−2.87
Liberal	Ian Stuart	3,650	10.89	+1.9
National Front	John Clifton	2,920	8.71	N/A
Union Movement	Dan Harmston	873	2.60	N/A
National Independence	Clare Macdonald	551	1.64	N/A
Democratic Conservative against the Common Market	Reginald Simmerson	341	1.02	N/A
Majority		1,178	3.5	−4.2
Turnout		35,513		
Conservative hold		Swing	-2.1	

She fought Uxbridge again at the following general election but again without success;

General election February 1974: Uxbridge
Party	Candidate	Votes	%	±%
Conservative	Michael Shersby	20,542	42.1	−0.2
Labour	Manuela Sykes	18,127	37.1	−1.8
Liberal	J.S. Pincham	10,150	20.8	+9.9
Majority		2,415	5.0	+1.5
Turnout			82.5	
Conservative hold		Swing	+0.7	

She stood down as Labour candidate and did not contest the general election eight months later and did not stand for parliament again. She did, however, stand for election to local government and was elected to Westminster City Council in 1974.

== Later life ==
She was diagnosed with dementia and campaigned for the rights of people diagnosed with dementia. Having been placed in a care home herself, she campaigned for her right to be allowed to live in her own home. She took the case to court and in 2014 won her right to live at home for a trial period of one month. Her return to her house proved unsustainable: she was back in the care home after a few weeks. She died in 2017.
