= Julian Robinson =

Julian Robinson may refer to:

- Julian Robinson (politician), Jamaican politician
- Julian Perry Robinson (1941–2020), British chemist and peace researcher
