= John Llewellin, 1st Baron Llewellin =

British Conservative politician (1893–1957)

Colonel The Right Honourable The Lord Llewellin GBE MC TD PC
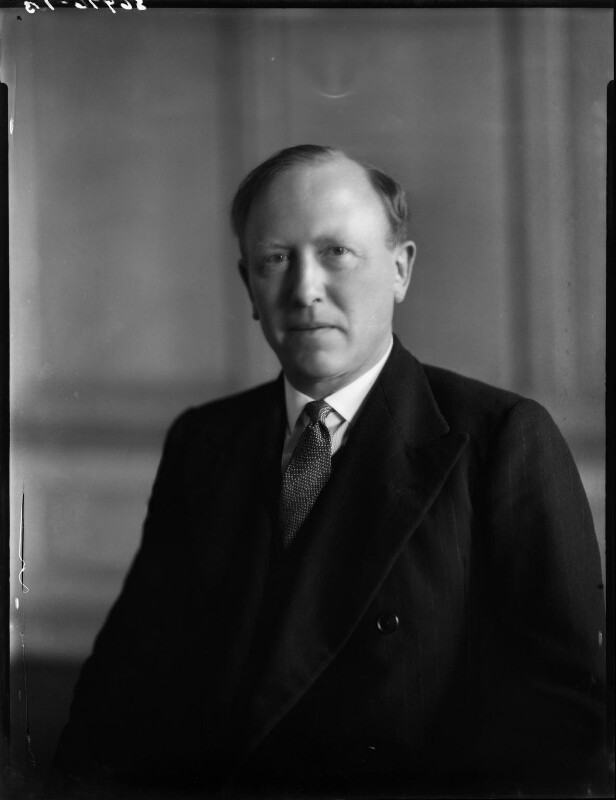

1st Governor-General of the Federation of Rhodesia and Nyasaland
- In office 4 September 1953 – 24 January 1957
- Monarch: Elizabeth II
- Prime Minister: The Viscount Malvern; Sir Roy Welensky
- Preceded by: Office established
- Succeeded by: Sir Robert Clarkson Tredgold

Minister of Aircraft Production
- In office 22 February 1942 – 22 November 1942
- Prime Minister: Winston Churchill
- Preceded by: The Lord Brabazon of Tara
- Succeeded by: Sir Stafford Cripps

President of the Board of Trade
- In office 4 – 22 February 1942
- Prime Minister: Winston Churchill
- Preceded by: Sir Andrew Duncan
- Succeeded by: Hugh Dalton

Member of Parliament for Uxbridge
- In office 30 May 1929 – 15 June 1945
- Preceded by: Sir Dennistoun Burney, Bt
- Succeeded by: Frank Beswick

Personal details
- Born: 6 February 1893 Chevening, Kent, England
- Died: 24 Jan 1957 Salisbury, Southern Rhodesia
- Party: Conservative
- Education: Eton College
- Military career
- Allegiance: United Kingdom
- Branch: British Army
- Service years: 1914-38
- Rank: Colonel
- Unit: Royal Garrison Artillery
- Commands: Dorset Heavy Brigade
- Conflicts: World War I
- Awards: Military Cross

John Jestyn Llewellin, 1st Baron Llewellin GBE MC TD PC (6 February 1893 – 24 January 1957) was a British army officer, Conservative Party politician and minister in Winston Churchill's war government.

== Background ==
Llewellin was the son of William Llewellin, of Upton House, Dorset, and Frances Mary, daughter of L. D. Wigan. He was educated at Eton.

== Military career ==
Llewellin was commissioned into the Royal Garrison Artillery in 1914 and reached the rank of major during the First World War, winning the Military Cross in 1917. He remained in the Territorial Army after the war and was promoted to lieutenant-colonel commanding the Dorset Heavy Brigade in 1932.

He was promoted colonel in 1936 and retired in 1938. He was appointed an Officer of the Order of the British Empire (OBE) in the 1926 Birthday Honours, promoted to a Commander (CBE) in the 1939 Birthday Honours, and then was made a Knight Grand Cross (GBE) in 1953.

== Political career ==
Llewellin was elected Member of Parliament (MP) for Uxbridge in Middlesex in 1929. He held a number of ministerial posts in the Coalition government, eventually serving as President of the Board of Trade for two weeks in 1942. He subsequently became Minister of Aircraft Production until replaced by Sir Stafford Cripps in November 1942. Later, Llewellin served on the Combined Policy Committee set up by the British and United States governments under the Quebec Agreement of 1943 to oversee the construction of the atomic bomb.

In December 1943, Llewellin's seat on the committee was assumed by Sir Ronald Campbell and Llewellin became Minister of Food, the position he held until the Churchill government fell to the Labour Party of Clement Attlee in July 1945. Llewellin lost his seat in the election and was raised to the peerage as Baron Llewellin, of Upton in the County of Dorset. After the war he served as Governor General of the Federation of Rhodesia and Nyasaland between 1953 and his death in January 1957.

== Personal life ==
Lord Lewellin died in January 1957, aged 63. The barony became extinct with his death.

== Arms ==
Coat of arms of John Llewellin, 1st Baron Llewellin
Crest A lamb passant Argent supporting with the dexter forefoot a flagstaff in bend sinister Proper therefrom flowing a banner Gules charged with a spear head Or between two wings of the third on each a like spear head. Escutcheon Gules three chevronels couped Ermine between as many spear heads Or. Supporters Dexter a farmer holding in the exterior hand a hay-fork; sinister an officer of the Merchant Navy holding in the exterior hand a pair of binoculars all Proper. Motto Duw Fo Ar Fy Rhan

== Bibliography ==
- Butler, David; Butler, Gareth (1994). British Political Facts 1900–1994 (7 ed.). Basingstoke and London: The Macmillan Press.

Parliament of the United Kingdom
Preceded by Sir Dennistoun Burney, Bt	Member of Parliament for Uxbridge; 1929–1945	Succeeded by Frank Beswick
Political offices
Preceded by Sir Andrew Duncan	President of the Board of Trade; 1942	Succeeded by Hugh Dalton
Preceded by John Moore-Brabazon	Minister of Aircraft Production; 1942	Succeeded by Sir Stafford Cripps
Preceded by The Lord Woolton	Minister of Food; 1943–1945	Succeeded by Sir Ben Smith
Government offices
New title	Governor-General of the Federation of Rhodesia and Nyasaland; 1953–1957	Succeeded by Robert Clarkson Tredgold
Peerage of the United Kingdom
New creation	Baron Llewellin; 1945–1957	Extinct
