= Richmond County School for Girls =

Location
- Richmond, London; England
- Coordinates: 51°27′51″N 0°18′10″W

Information
- Established: 1861
- Founder: Founded as a Ladies' Establishment in Richmond
- Closed: 1974
- Gender: Girls
- Age: 11 to 18
- Houses: Day Houses: 4

Richmond County School for Girls (sometimes referred to as Richmond Grammar School for Girls) was a school at Richmond in London that was once noted for having cricket in its curriculum; which resulted in the emergence from the school of a number of female cricketers, some of whom went on to play for England.

== History ==
The school had its origins in the Ladies' Establishment established in 1861 on Kew Foot Road in Richmond, Surrey (although now in London). In 1865 the school moved to Matson House in the Marshgate area of Richmond and thus became Matson College. Matson College was referred to as a college For Gentlemen's Daughters.

In 1886 the Church Schools' Company became the owners and the school became Richmond High School for Girls. After the 1902 Education Act, the responsibility for the school passed to Surrey County Council in conjunction with Richmond Borough Council, Richmond still being in Surrey at that time. A new school building was then constructed on a road named Parkshot in Richmond and this was opened in 1909 as Richmond County School for Girls.

When the United Kingdom Government passed the Education Act 1944 a Tripartite System was established dividing Secondary schools into three categories, Grammar schools, Technical schools and Modern Schools. The grammar school was deemed the place of education for the academically gifted (as determined by the 11-plus exam) and Richmond County School for Girls became a grammar school. This led to the colloquial name of Richmond Grammar School for Girls.

In the early 1970s, the Borough of Richmond reorganised its education with the setting up of a number of comprehensive schools and, as a result, Richmond County School for Girls was closed in 1974., the remainder of the school joining with similarly placed Shene Grammar at the Shene site.

== Buildings ==
After its closure as a school the building was used almost immediately by a lending and reference service. In January 1978 the building was closed for just over three months in order to eradicate extensive dry rot. The Parkshot site is now occupied by Richmond Adult Community College. Among its facilities are the Queen Charlotte Hall and Studio Theatre. The Richmond Business School is also within the grounds of the site.

== Houses ==
All girls were members of one of four day houses, each house being named after an animal that had some connection with Richmond, be that its heraldry or its history:

House	Colours
Lion	Red
Hinde	Yellow
Swan	Blue
Heron	Green

== Sport ==
The school was unusual in its promotion of cricket as the school sport for the girls. A number of girls went on to play at a senior level and some played for their country including Shirley Driscoll who played cricket for England. The school was also visited by cricketer Rachael Heyhoe-Flint.

== Notable alumnae ==
- Shirley Driscoll - played cricket for England
- Janet Ellis - Television presenter (presented Blue Peter), and mother of Sophie Ellis-Bextor
- Patricia Hornsby-Smith - Conservative politician
- Gee Langdon - writer, lyricist and composer
- Manuela Sykes - politician
