= Gee Langdon =

British writer, lyricist and composer

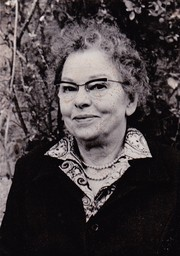

Gee Langdon (1907–1993) was a British writer, lyricist and composer.

== Early life and education ==
Langdon was born Gladys Annie Joel in Richmond, Surrey, and was educated at the Richmond County School for Girls and St. Hugh's College, Oxford, where she captained the college netball VII and graduated in English. She was the Great Aunt of John Henry Dixon.

== Career ==
Beginning in 1933, Langdon worked as the head of the Conway Library of photographic reproduction at the Courtauld Institute of Art, under Anthony Blunt, as the Archivist of the Royal Geographical Society and, during the Second World War, in a government department in London. Her research included the analysis of tithe maps, enumeration books, directories and other historical documents to develop a picture of daily life in nineteenth century England.

Langdon is the author of several books, and her songs and lyrics have been recorded by several musical artists.

== Selected works ==
=== Books ===
- Don Roberto's Daughter. Random House. 1968. ISBN 9780701113094.
- Clue From The Past. Hale Limited. 1973. ISBN 9780709133865.
- The Year Of The Map - Portrait of a Wiltshire Town in 1841. Compton Press. 1976. ISBN 9780859550406.

=== Songs ===
- Not the Marrying Kind (written with Elton Hayes, 1953) - recorded by Elton Hayes, Parlophone
- Letter to a Soldier - recorded by Barbara Lyon, Columbia 1956 - UK #27, Gracie Fields, Decca 1956, Terry Burton, Philips 1956, Annita Ray, Zephyr 1957 and Jane Forrest, Embassy 1957
- The Road to the Stars - recorded by Andy Cole, EMI 1956
- White Wedding (with music by Cyril Watters, 1962) - recorded by Sheila Southern, HMV and Kay Wilson, Ember
