= John Ryan (British politician) =

John Ryan (30 April 1940 – 26 March 2002) was a British politician, businessman and University Lecturer.

== Student political career ==
Ryan was born in Scotland and went to Lanark Grammar School followed by Glasgow University where he obtained an Honours degree in Economic History. He joined the Labour Party in 1958, and was a member of the National Association of Labour Students Organisations from 1958 to 1962. He also joined the Fabian Society in 1961.

At the 1964 general election Ryan was Labour candidate for South Buckinghamshire; at the age of 24, he was one of the youngest candidates. He was on the executive committee of Paddington North Constituency Labour Party from 1964.

== Parliament ==
Ryan was selected as candidate for Uxbridge, and managed to win the seat in the 1966 general election. He was the youngest Member of Parliament elected in the election, and held the title until Les Huckfield was elected in a byelection the following year.

Ryan shared with others progressive avant-garde positions: outspoken criticism of the Vietnam War which the United States ultimately conceded, advocacy for House of Lords reform, which ultimately came to pass after his lifetime. Equally he opposed any alliance with the white settler-led Rhodesian government. He allied with the left-wing Tribune Group and was a Director of Tribune Publications from 1969.

== Subsequent career ==
Ryan was defeated at the 1970 general election. He became a Management Consultant and associate member of the Market Research Society, and later took up a position as a Lecturer. At the time of his death he was Senior Lecturer in Management Studies at Napier University in Edinburgh.

Parliament of the United Kingdom
Preceded by Charles Curran	Member of Parliament for Uxbridge; 1966–1970	Succeeded by Charles Curran
Political offices
Preceded by David Steel	Baby of the House; 1966–1967	Succeeded by Les Huckfield
