= Mary Kaldor =

British academic (born 1946)

The Honourable Mary Kaldor CBE
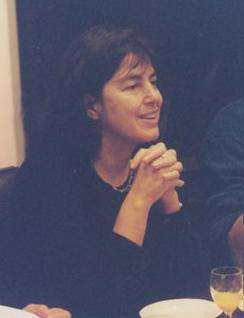
- Kaldor in 2000.
- Born: 16 March 1946 (age 80); Cambridge
- Spouse: Julian Perry Robinson
- Parents: Nicholas Kaldor (father); Clarissa Goldschmidt (mother)
- Relatives: Frances Stewart (sister)

Academic background
- Education: Somerville College, Oxford

Academic work
- Discipline: Global governance
- Institutions: London School of Economics

Mary Henrietta Kaldor CBE (born 16 March 1946) is a British academic, currently Professor of Global Governance at the London School of Economics, where she is also the Director of the Civil Society and Human Security Research Unit. She also teaches at the Institut Barcelona d'Estudis Internacionals (IBEI). Kaldor has been a key figure in the development of cosmopolitan democracy. She writes on globalisation, international relations and humanitarian intervention, global civil society and global governance, as well as what she calls New Wars.

== Career ==
In 1981, Kaldor was a member of the anti-nuclear Labour Party Defence Study Group. She was a founding member of European Nuclear Disarmament, editing its European Nuclear Disarmament Journal (1983–88). She was the founder and Co-Chair of the Helsinki Citizens Assembly, and a founding member of the European Council on Foreign Relations. She also writes for OpenDemocracy.net, belongs to the board of trustees of the Hertie School of Governance, and is on the Editorial Board of Stability: International Journal of Security and Development.

In 1999 Kaldor supported international military intervention over Kosovo on humanitarian grounds, calling for NATO ground forces to follow aerial bombardment in an article for The Guardian. However, Kaldor had lost faith in humanitarian intervention by 2009, telling the same paper: "The international community makes a terrible mess wherever it goes":

It is hard to find a single example of humanitarian intervention during the 1990s that can be unequivocally declared a success. Especially after Kosovo, the debate about whether human rights can be enforced through military means is ever more intense. Moreover, the wars in Afghanistan and Iraq, which have been justified in humanitarian terms, have further called into question the case for intervention.

These views were repeated in her 2013 book Human Security.

== Family ==
She is the daughter of the economist Nicholas Kaldor and Clarissa Goldschmidt, a history graduate of the University of Oxford who studied at Somerville College. She is also the sister of Frances Stewart, Professor at the Oxford Department of International Development (ODID) at Oxford. The Kaldor family moved to west Cambridge in 1950. Kaldor began her career with a B.A. in philosophy, politics and economics (PPE) from Oxford University. In 2008, she married Julian Perry Robinson, a chemist and lawyer, who died 22 April 2020. The couple first met while both were working at Stockholm International Peace Research Institute (SIPRI) and joined the University of Sussex in 1971. They had two sons.

== Selected bibliography ==
=== Books ===
- Kaldor, Mary (1978). The Disintegrating West. New York: Hill and Wang. ISBN 9780809039043.
- Kaldor, Mary (1981). The Baroque Arsenal. New York: Hill and Wang. ISBN 9780809028122.
- Kaldor, Mary (1990). The Imaginary War: Understanding the East-West Conflict. Oxford, Oxfordshire, UK Cambridge, Massachusetts, USA: Blackwell. ISBN 9781557861801.
- Kaldor, Mary (2003). Global Civil Society: An Answer to War. Cambridge, UK Malden, Massachusetts: Polity Press. ISBN 9780745627588.
- Kaldor, Mary (2007). Human Security: Reflections on Globalization and Intervention. Cambridge, UK Malden, Massachusetts: Polity Press. ISBN 9780745638546.
- Kaldor, Mary (2012). New & Old Wars: Organized Violence in a Global Era (3rd ed.). Stanford, California: Stanford University Press. ISBN 9780804785495.

Second edition, ISBN 9780745638638
First edition, ISBN 9780804737227

- Kaldor, Mary (2018). Global Security Cultures, UK Cambridge, Massachusetts, USA: Polity Press. ISBN 9781509509218

=== Chapters in books ===
- Kaldor, Mary (1982), "Warfare and Capitalism", in New Left Review (ed.), Exterminism and Cold War, Thetford, Norfolk: New Left Review, Verso edition by Thetford Press Ltd., pp. 261–287, ISBN 0-86091-746-0
- Kaldor, Mary (2009), "Protective security or protection rackets? War and sovereignty", in Kanbur, Ravi; Basu, Kaushik (eds.), Arguments for a Better World: Essays in Honor of Amartya Sen | Volume II: Society, Institutions and Development, Oxford New York: Oxford University Press, pp. 470–487, ISBN 9780199239979.
- Kaldor, Mary (2011), "War and Economic Crisis", in Calhoun, Craig; Derluguian, Georgi (eds.), Possible Futures Series: The Deepening Crisis: Governance Challenges after Neoliberalism, London and New York: New York University Press, pp. 109–133, ISBN 978-0-8147-7280-5

=== Journal articles ===
- Kaldor, Mary (2013). "In defence of new wars". Stability: International Journal of Security and Development. 2 (1): 4. doi:10.5334/sta.at.
- Kaldor, Mary (2020). "Human Security: Practical Possibilities". LSE Public Policy Review. 1 (2) 7. doi:10.31389/lseppr.15.
