= Arthur Mills, 3rd Baron Hillingdon =

British peer and politician

Arthur Robert Mills, 3rd Baron Hillingdon (13 October 1891 – 5 December 1952), styled The Honourable Arthur Mills between 1898 and 1919, was a British Conservative politician.

Mills was the second son of Charles Mills, 2nd Baron Hillingdon, and the Honourable Alice Marion Harbord, daughter of Charles Harbord, 5th Baron Suffield. He succeeded his elder brother Charles Thomas Mills as Member of Parliament for Uxbridge in 1915, a seat he held until 1918. In 1919 he entered the House of Lords on the death of his father.

Lord Hillingdon married the Honourable Edith Mary Winifred Cadogan, daughter of Henry Cadogan, Viscount Chelsea, in 1916. They had two sons and three daughters. Lady Hillingdon was chairman of the Central Women's Advisory Committee of the Conservative Party and was made a Dame Commander of the Order of the British Empire (DBE) in 1939. She was godmother to her niece Sarah, eldest daughter of John Spencer-Churchill, 10th Duke of Marlborough.

Lord Hillingdon died in December 1952, aged 61, and was succeeded in the barony by his eldest son, Charles. Lady Hillingdon died in June 1969, aged 73.

== Arms ==
Coat of arms of Arthur Mills, 3rd Baron Hillingdon
Crest A demi-lion reguardant Or gorged with a collar gemel Azure between the paws a millrind Sable. Escutcheon Gyronny of eight Argent and Azure a millrind Sable. Supporters On either side a lion reguardant Or gorged with a collar gemel Azure charged on the shoulder with a cross flory Sable. Motto Nil Conscire Sibi

Parliament of the United Kingdom
Preceded by Hon. Charles Mills	Member of Parliament for Uxbridge; 1915–1918	Succeeded by Sir Sidney Peel, Bt
Peerage of the United Kingdom
Preceded by Charles William Mills	Baron Hillingdon; 1919–1952	Succeeded by Charles Hedworth Mills
