= New wars =

Term characterizing warfare in the post-Cold War era

New wars is a term advanced by British academic Mary Kaldor to characterize warfare in the post-Cold War era. This form of warfare is characterized by:

- violence between varying combinations of state and non-state networks
- fighting in the name of identity politics as opposed to ideology
- attempts to achieve political, rather than physical, control of the population through fear and terror
- conflict financed not necessarily through the state, but through other predatory means that seek the continuation of violence

Other terms used for the concept include "wars among the people", "wars of the third kind", "hybrid wars", "privatized wars", and "post-modern wars". The new wars thesis has been adopted and adapted by other authors, as well as critiqued from various perspectives.

== Description ==
Kaldor's definition of "new wars" is made within the context of a wider "new wars thesis" debate between academics on how to properly define or brand the apparent revolution in warfare in the post-Cold War world. Kaldor purports that new war characteristics must be analyzed within the context of globalization. Kaldor does admit that "new wars" are not necessarily new, in that they have no precedent in history; however, she insists on keeping the term because there is still a definite need for new policy responses. Old international strategies have failed to address the characteristics of new wars successfully and instead continue to treat it as old conventional warfare. The term is an antonym of conventional warfare whereby conventional military weapons and battlefield tactics are no longer used between two or more states in open confrontation.

Other authors also attempted to characterize the shift in warfare but using other descriptors. Recognizing the blur between state and non-state actors and dual conflation of interstate and intrastate conflict, Frank Hoffman portrays modern wars as "hybrid wars". Martin Shaw chose the term "degenerate warfare" to describe how a belligerent attacks the enemy's civilian population as part of a broader military campaign, as in aerial bombing of cities, but destroying it is not the ultimate goal: the enemy is the state, not the enemy's population.

Often, the term "new war" is compared to or defined as "low-intensity conflict," a term invented by the US Army which broadly encompasses all modern warfare that does not quite meet the threshold or level of violence found in conventional wars.

Other supporters of the new wars theory are Herfried Münkler from Germany, Martin van Creveld from Israel, Mohammad Mirwais Balkhi from Afghanistan and Mohamed Mahmoud Ould Mohamedou from Mauritania.

== Criticisms ==
Kaldor's concept of new wars has been criticized by some, who question whether the distinction between old and new can be made. De Waal stipulates that the idea of "New Wars" used by Kaldor is not a description of new conflicts as such but a description of conflicts in less governed countries.

Duffield suggests that what is viewed as "new" is the security terrain which has been shaped by what he terms network wars, which are described as "rhizomatic and anti-institution in character" and which can be typically associated with alterations in social life. Network wars are seen as an uncertain and violent form of reflexive modernity and where "war as a reflexive network enterprise does not follow the traditional state-based pattern of escalation, stalemate, and decline". Furthermore, the wars in Africa are seen as involving not just national but also other international actors.

Edward Newman writes of the importance of considering historical examples for making any statements about qualitative changes in recent wars. He suggests that there are many valuable points made in new wars scholarship, including the importance of social and economic dynamics to warfare, and that there are examples of modern wars such as the Bosnian War that fit the new wars template. However, he argues that most of the elements of "new wars" are not actually new, but rather have existed for at least the past century. In Newman's view, these elements have been more and less prominent at different times and places, rather than just increasing in recent times, and the major differences now are that "academics, policy analysts, and politicians are focusing on these factors more than before" and understanding them better and that the media have increased public awareness of the realities and atrocities of war.

In 2013, Kaldor addressed the four main components of her detractors' arguments: whether new wars are ‘new’; whether new wars are war or crime; whether the data support the claims about new wars; and whether new wars are ‘post-Clausewitzean’. Kaldor immediately points out "one of the problems with many of the critics is that they lump together the different versions of the argument and treat criticism of one particular aspect contained in one particular version as a criticism of the whole argument." First, she counters the critique against distinguishing between 'old' and 'new' wars. Critics concede the 'new wars' thesis is helpful in foreign policy decisions, which was her intent.

Another critique is that new wars do not capture the gendered logic and impact of war.

== Bibliography ==
- Hoffman, Frank (2007), The Rise of Hybrids Wars (Arlington, VA: Potomac Institute for Policy Studies
- Mueller, John (2004), The Remnants of War (New York: Cornell University Press)
- Shaw, Martin (2003), War and Genocide (Oxford: Polity Press)
- United States Department of the Army (5 December 1990), Field Manual 100-20: Military Operations in Low Intensity Conflict
- De Waal, A. (2009). Mission without end? Peacekeeping in the African political marketplace. International Affairs (London), 85(1), 99-113.
