= John Henry Dixon =

English cricketer

Personal information
- Full name: John Henry Dixon
- Born: 3 March 1954 (age 72); Westbourne, Hampshire, England
- Batting: Right-handed
- Bowling: Right-arm fast-medium

Domestic team information
- Years: Team
- 1973: Oxford University
- 1973–1981: Gloucestershire
- 1978–1988: Wiltshire

Career statistics
Competition	First-class	List A
Matches	16	20
Runs scored	77	41
Batting average	6.41	3.41
100s/50s	–/–	–/–
Top score	13*	12
Balls bowled	1,894	945
Wickets	21	13
Bowling average	54.09	58.46
5 wickets in innings	2	–
10 wickets in match	–	–
Best bowling	5/44	2/15
Catches/stumpings	6/–	6/–
- Source: Cricinfo, 26 April 2020

John Henry Dixon (born 3 March 1954) is an English former first-class cricketer active from 1973 to 1988 who played for Gloucestershire, Oxford University and Wiltshire. He was born in Bournemouth. He appeared in 16 first-class matches as a right-handed batsman who bowled right arm medium-fast pace. He scored 77 runs with a highest score of 13* and held six catches. He took 21 wickets with a best analysis of five for 44. He was one of the bowlers during the then world record partnership for the second wicket between Warwickshire's Rohan Kanhai and John Jameson at Edgbaston in 1974. Dixon is the great-nephew of Gee Langdon and became a publisher and author.

Between 1984 and 1992 he was the publisher of The Cricket Diary, which included, amongst much other cricket information and records, weekly quotations, illustrations and most well-known cricketers' birthdays. His First Peel The Otter, a spoof cookery book, contained unfeasible recipes of a surreal, whimsical or gruesome nature. He subsequently contributed to The Marmite Cookbook and The Bumper Book of Marmite. Playwright Dougie Blaxland cites him as a major influence.

He plays bass guitar in The Disintegraters with, amongst others, Henry Marsh of the band Sailor, Stuart Ryan and Stephen (Austin) Clark.
