= Walter Goldsworthy =

British politician

Major-General Walter Goldsworthy CB
- Born: Walter Tuckfield Goldsworthy; 8 May 1837; Marylebone, London, England
- Died: 13 October 1911 (aged 74)

Major-General Walter Tuckfield Goldsworthy CB (8 May 1837 – 13 October 1911) was a British Army officer and a Conservative Party politician.

Goldsworthy was born in Marylebone, London. He travelled to India with his father, setting up a merchant business in Calcutta in 1854 and, together with his brother Sir Roger Tuckfield Goldsworthy (1839–1900), he joined the volunteer cavalry known as Havelock's Irregulars. During the Indian Mutiny of 1857, he won medals and was mentioned in dispatches. He was later commissioned into the 8th Hussars. In 1859 he was promoted lieutenant without purchase. In 1864, as a captain, he exchanged into the 91st Foot. In 1866 he was promoted brevet major and in 1868 he became a full major on half-pay. In 1874, still on half-pay, he was promoted brevet lieutenant-colonel and in 1880 brevet colonel. In 1882 he became lieutenant-colonel in the Essex Regiment. He was later promoted major general. In 1897 Goldsworthy was receiving £466 per annum from the Indian revenues from annuities subscribed to while on service in India.

Goldsworthy was elected Member of Parliament for Hammersmith in the 1885 general election and held the seat until the 1900 general election.

In March 1886 Goldsworthy presented a petition to Parliament asking to extend the voting franchise to women.

He is credited with a donation of £105 to the Chelsea and Westminster Hospital in 1892.

In 1890, the 11,888 square feet (1,104.4 m^{2}) Yaldham Manor, Kent was advertised in The Times and sold to Goldsworthy. He bred hunters and built the stables and carriage shed. Arthur Nye Peckham, who visited Yaldham in 1911 noted the general had "re-opened the great hall, which had been cut into four rooms".

Parliament of the United Kingdom
New constituency	Member of Parliament for Hammersmith; 1885 – 1900	Succeeded by William James Bull
