= Frank Beswick, Baron Beswick =

British politician (1911–1987)

The Right Honourable The Lord Beswick PC

Deputy Leader of the House of Lords
- In office February 1974 – December 1975
- Prime Minister: Harold Wilson
- Leader: The Lord Shepherd
- Preceded by: The Lord Aberdare
- Succeeded by: The Lord Goronwy-Roberts

Minister of State for Industry
- In office 11 March 1974 – 4 December 1975
- Prime Minister: Harold Wilson
- Preceded by: Eric Heffer
- Succeeded by: Gerald Kaufman

Chief Whip of the House of Lords Captain of the Honourable Corps of Gentlemen-at-Arms
- In office 29 July 1967 – 24 June 1970
- Prime Minister: Harold Wilson
- Preceded by: The Lord Shepherd
- Succeeded by: The Earl St Aldwyn

Parliamentary Under-Secretary of State for Commonwealth Affairs
- In office 11 October 1965 – 26 July 1967
- Prime Minister: Harold Wilson
- Preceded by: The Lord Taylor
- Succeeded by: William Whitlock

Member of the House of Lords Lord Temporal
- In office 18 December 1964 – 17 August 1987; Life Peerage

Member of Parliament for Uxbridge
- In office 5 July 1945 – 18 September 1959
- Preceded by: John Llewellin
- Succeeded by: Charles Curran

Personal details
- Born: Frank Beswick; 21 August 1911 Hucknall, Nottinghamshire, England, UK
- Died: 17 August 1987 (aged 75)
- Party: Labour Co-operative
- Occupation: Politician

Frank Beswick, Baron Beswick, PC (21 August 1911 – 17 August 1987) was a British Labour Co-operative politician.

== Early life ==
Born in 1911 in Nottinghamshire, Beswick's father was a coal miner. He was born and lived Hucknall. He attended the Hucknall Upper Standard School. He had three sisters.

He was educated at the Working Men's College in London. He became a journalist and was elected to the London County Council. He was in Spain during the Spanish Civil War.

== Career ==
Already a qualified pilot, he joined the Royal Air Force Volunteer Reserve during the Second World War and served with Transport Command. A Sergeant Pilot, he was commissioned Pilot Officer in April 1942, and promoted Flying Officer in October 1942 and Flight Lieutenant in March 1944. He remained in the RAFVR after the war, resigning his commission in 1952.

== Parliament ==
Beswick was elected to Parliament for Uxbridge in 1945 and served until 1959. He was one of the British observers at the 1946 Bikini atomic tests. Following Labour's loss at the 1951 election, he became civil aviation correspondent for the Reynolds News, having been Parliamentary Secretary to the Minister of Civil Aviation. When he lost his seat in 1959, he was appointed political secretary of the London Co-operative Society.

He was created Baron Beswick, of Hucknall in the County of Nottinghamshire, on 18 December 1964. He served as Parliamentary Under Secretary of State in the Commonwealth Office from 1965 then became Government Chief Whip in the House of Lords in 1967. Continuing in the whip role into Opposition in 1970, in 1974 he was appointed Minister of State for Industry and Deputy Leader of the House of Lords, serving until 1975, and later became the first Chairman of British Aerospace. In 1975 he was UK signatory of the convention establishing the European Space Agency.

In 1985 he opened the first ever televised debate in the Lords.

== Personal life ==
In 1945, he lived 8 Hardwick Road, Sherwood, and his parents, Mr & Mrs Jesse Smith Beswick, lived at Ebor Cottage on Wood Lane in Hucknall. His mother was Amy Adelaide Clarke

His father Jesse died on Sunday 28 December 1947. Frank was at home in Hucknall, when his father died, aged 78. He was the only person from Hucknall to sit as an MP.

He married Dora Rafters (1910–94). He died at St George’s Hospital in Tooting,

His sister, Amy Burton, died aged 86 on Sunday January 1991, and had lived on Perlethorpe Drive for 53 years.

Parliament of the United Kingdom
Preceded by John Llewellin	Member of Parliament for Uxbridge; 1945–1959	Succeeded by Charles Curran
Political offices
Preceded by The Lord Taylor; Eirene White	Under-Secretary of State for the Colonies; 1965–1966; With: The Lord Taylor	Succeeded by Himself as Under-Secretary of State for Commonwealth Affairs
Preceded by The Lord Taylor	Under-Secretary of State for Commonwealth Relations; 1965–1966	Succeeded by Himself as Under-Secretary of State for Commonwealth Affairs
Preceded by 2nd Baron Shepherd	Captain of the Honourable Corps of Gentlemen-at-Arms; 1967–1970	Succeeded by The Earl St Aldwyn
Preceded by The Lord Aberdare	Deputy Leader of the House of Lords; 1974–1975	Succeeded by The Lord Goronwy-Roberts
New institution	Under-Secretary of State for Commonwealth Affairs; 1966–1967	Succeeded by William Whitlock
