= Clive Soley =

British politician

The Right Honourable The Lord Soley
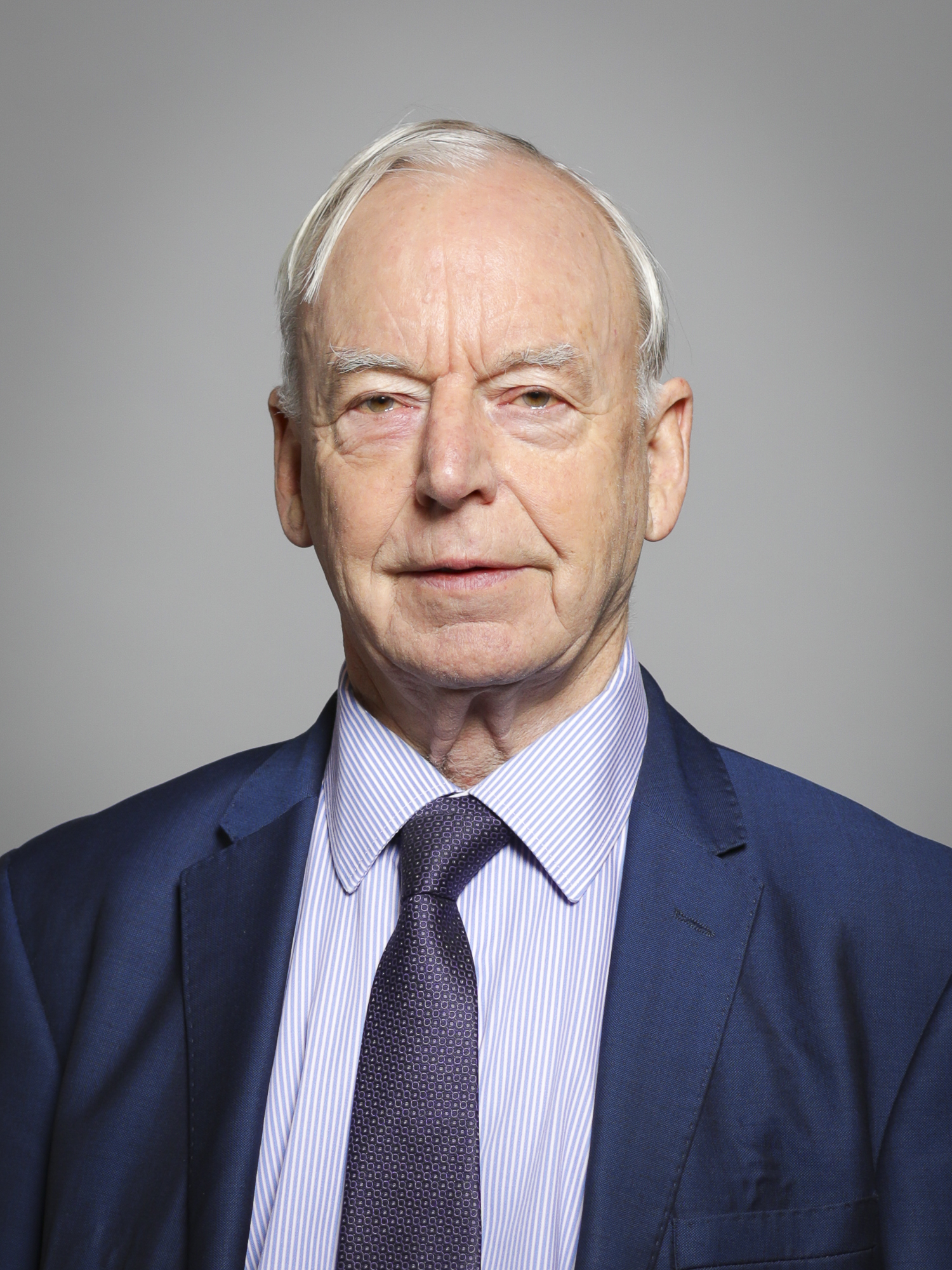
- Official portrait, 2019

Chair of the Parliamentary Labour Party
- In office 3 May 1997 – 11 July 2001
- Leader: Tony Blair
- Preceded by: Doug Hoyle
- Succeeded by: Jean Corston

Member of the House of Lords
- Lord Temporal
- Life peerage 29 June 2005 – 19 January 2023

Member of Parliament for Ealing, Acton and Shepherd's Bush Hammersmith (1983–1997) Hammersmith North (1979–1983)
- In office 3 May 1979 – 11 April 2005
- Preceded by: Frank Tomney
- Succeeded by: Andy Slaughter

Personal details
- Born: 7 May 1939 (age 87)
- Party: Labour
- Education: University of Southampton, University of Strathclyde

Clive Stafford Soley, Baron Soley (born 7 May 1939) is a British Labour Party politician. He served as a Member of Parliament (MP) from 1979 to 2005, and later as a Member of the House of Lords until 2023.

== Early life ==
He went to Downshall Secondary Modern School (eventually ended up as Seven Kings High School) on Aldborough Road in Seven Kings near Ilford, then Newbattle Adult Education College in Newbattle, Midlothian, from 1961 to 1963. He did RAF National Service from 1959 to 1961. He went to the University of Strathclyde, where he gained a BA in Politics and Psychology in 1968, then the University of Southampton, where he gained a Diploma in Applied Social Studies in 1970. He was a British Council Officer from 1968 to 1969, then a Probation Officer from 1970 to 1979 for the Inner London Probation Service. He was a councillor on Hammersmith Council from 1974 to 1978.

== Parliamentary career ==
Soley was a Labour Party Member of Parliament from 1979, first for the constituency of Hammersmith North, then Hammersmith and finally Ealing, Acton and Shepherd's Bush from 1997 to 2005. In 1981, he was a member of the anti-nuclear Labour Party Defence Study Group and was chair of the Parliamentary Labour Party from 1997 to 2001. In 2003, he voted in favour of the government's decision to engage in military action against Iraq.

In 2005, it was announced that he would be given a life peerage, and on 29 June 2005 he was created Baron Soley, of Hammersmith in the London Borough of Hammersmith and Fulham. He was from 2005 to 2010 Campaign Director of Future Heathrow, an organisation dedicated to the expansion of Heathrow. He was from 2004 to 2016, chair of the trustees of Mary Seacole Memorial Statue Appeal, now renamed the Mary Seacole Trust, which worked for the erection of the statue of Mary Seacole in the grounds of St Thomas' Hospital in London.

== Personal life ==
Soley has a son and daughter. He is an Honorary Associate of the National Secular Society.

Parliament of the United Kingdom
Preceded by Frank Tomney	Member of Parliament for Hammersmith North; 1979–1983	Constituency abolished
New constituency	Member of Parliament for Hammersmith; 1983–1997	Constituency abolished
New constituency	Member of Parliament for Ealing, Acton and Shepherd's Bush; 1997–2005	Succeeded by Andy Slaughter
Political offices
Preceded by Doug Hoyle	Chair of the Parliamentary Labour Party; 1997–2001	Succeeded by Jean Corston
Orders of precedence in the United Kingdom
Preceded by The Lord Anderson of Swansea	Gentlemen; Baron Soley	Followed by The Lord Goodlad
