= Charles Curran (politician) =

British politician (1903–1972)

Member of Parliament for Uxbridge
- In office 18 June 1970 – 16 September 1972
- Preceded by: John Ryan
- Succeeded by: Michael Shersby
- In office 8 October 1959 – 10 March 1966
- Preceded by: Frank Beswick
- Succeeded by: John Ryan

Personal details
- Born: Leslie Charles Curran; 19 April 1903 Cardiff, Wales
- Died: 16 September 1972 (aged 69) Kyrenia, Cyprus
- Party: Conservative
- Spouse: Mona Regan (m. 1926)
- Children: 1
- Profession: Journalist; barrister

Leslie Charles Curran (19 April 1903 – 16 September 1972) was a British Conservative Party politician, barrister, and journalist, who was the MP for Uxbridge from 1959 to 1966, and again from 1970 until his death.

== Background ==
Born in Cardiff, he was the son of C. J. Curran, and was educated at Cardiff High School and Stonyhurst College, a large independent school.

== Career ==
Curran was a sub-editor of the Evening Express, before becoming a barrister in 1932 of Gray's Inn. He continued to work in journalism through his life, contributing variously to the Evening Standard, the Daily Mirror, and The Sunday Telegraph. Curran published one satirical novel, You Know You Can Trust Me (Jonathan Cape, 1938).

Curran unsuccessfully contested West Walthamstow for the Conservatives at the 1945 general election. He then lost at Uxbridge in 1951 and 1955 before being elected in 1959. He was defeated by Labour in 1966, but he regained the seat in 1970, holding it until he died in 1972. Michael Shersby of his party was elected to succeed him in the subsequent by-election.

Curran is probably most remembered for a speech he made in the House on 19 June 1964, in which he mistook deliberately nonsensical poems written by John Lennon as a sign of Lennon being poorly educated and virtually illiterate, saying "one can see from it [...] two things about John Lennon: he has a feeling for words and story telling and he is in a state of pathetic near-literacy" and suggesting that he lacked "an education which would have enabled him to develop the literary talent that he appears to have". Fellow Conservative Norman Miscampbell tried to downplay and make light of the misunderstanding, feeling that his words would be disastrous for the party in the upcoming elections that year.

== Personal life ==
Curran married Mona Regan in 1926, and had one son. After a period of declining health due to heart problems, he died on 16 September 1972, aged 69, during a holiday in Kyrenia, Cyprus.

Parliament of the United Kingdom
Preceded by Frank Beswick	Member of Parliament for Uxbridge; 1959–1966	Succeeded by John Ryan
Preceded by John Ryan	Member of Parliament for Uxbridge; 1970–1972	Succeeded by Michael Shersby
