= Labour Party Defence Study Group =

1970s group within the UK Labour Party

The Labour Party Defence Study Group was a grouping within the British Labour Party established in 1975 by the party's National Executive Committee (NEC) under the chairmanship of Ian Mikardo.

== History ==
The party was established at a time when Britain's defence policy was being increasingly criticised by anti-nuclear weapons activists who had recently been elected to the NEC.

The final report of the group Sense About Defence, was produced as a booklet in September 1977. It advocated a more left-wing view of Britain's defence policy, including: a reduction in nuclear bases and weapons, saying that no more should be commissioned, and argued for a reduction in Britain's military expenditure. However, it was ignored by the Labour government, which adopted a policy more pleasing to the centre-right of the party.

By the 1980s, the party was more aligned with peace movements in Britain. In 1981, the NEC drew up a policy which pledged Labour to the closing down of American and British bases on British soil, refusing to accept Cruise missiles, Polaris and Trident, and unilateral nuclear disarmament. The statement was carried in that year's conference, and the party asked the Defence Study Group (which at that time included Robin Cook, Mary Kaldor, Clive Soley and Mike Gapes) to produce an interim report which reaffirmed Labour's unilateralism, saying "British possession of strategic nuclear weapons has given no leverage to promote nuclear disarmament", and emphasised the need for conventional forces. The group also discussed issues such as limiting job losses which would occur while limiting the arms trade.
