= Julian Perry Robinson =

British chemist (1941–2020)

Julian Philip Perry Robinson (11 November 1941 – 22 April 2020) was a British chemist and peace researcher.

== Early life ==
Born in Jerusalem, Perry Robinson was educated at Canford School, and went to Merton College, Oxford in 1960 to study Chemistry; he took a second class degree in 1964. After university he spent four years studying national and international patent law with a London-based firm of Chartered Patent Agents.

== Career ==
Robinson held research appointments at the Free University of Berlin, Harvard University and the University of Sussex.

Robinson was a consultant to the World Health Organization, United Nations, the International Committee of the Red Cross and the United Nations Environment Programme.

Robinson was a member of staff at the Stockholm International Peace Research Institute from 1968 to 1971. While there he was a principal contributor to the six volume study The Problem of Chemical and Biological Warfare.

Robinson was also a co-convenor of the Pugwash Study Group on Implementation of the Chemical and Biological Weapons Conventions, co-directed the Harvard Sussex Program on Chemical and Biological Weapons, which published the CBW Conventions Bulletin.

== Personal life and death ==
Robinson died on 22 April 2020 as a result of complications related to COVID-19 during the COVID-19 pandemic in England. His widow is the academic Mary Kaldor.

== See also ==
- List of peace activists
