= Ealing, Acton and Shepherd's Bush =

UK Parliament constituency (1997–2010)

Coordinates: 51.517°N 0.260°W

- Former borough constituency for the House of Commons
- Boundary of Ealing, Acton and Shepherd's Bush in Greater London for the 2005 general election
- County: Greater London

1997–2010
- Seats: One
- Created from: Ealing Acton and Hammersmith
- Replaced by: Ealing Central and Acton and Hammersmith

Ealing, Acton and Shepherd's Bush was a parliamentary constituency represented in the House of Commons of the Parliament of the United Kingdom. It elected one Member of Parliament (MP) by the first past the post system of election. The constituency was abolished at the 2010 general election when it was divided between the new seats of Ealing Central and Acton and Hammersmith, with then incumbent Andy Slaughter becoming MP for the latter seat.

== History ==
In 1981, 14% of the constituency was non-White.

== Boundaries ==
The constituency incorporated the easternmost section of the London Borough of Ealing (covering Ealing and Acton) as well as the northern part of the London Borough of Hammersmith and Fulham (covering Shepherd's Bush and White City).

The constituency was made up of the following electoral wards:

- From the London Borough of Ealing: Hanger Lane; Heathfield; Southfield; Springfield; Vale; Victoria.
- From the London Borough of Hammersmith and Fulham: College Park and Old Oak; Coningham; Starch Green; White City and Shepherd's Bush; Wormholt.

Boundary changes which took effect at the 2010 general election erased the constituency. The section which fell within the London Borough of Ealing was combined with parts of central Ealing to create a new Ealing Central and Acton constituency, whilst the area falling within the London Borough of Hammersmith & Fulham (namely Shepherd's Bush) was combined with the northern part of the old Hammersmith and Fulham constituency to create a new Hammersmith seat.

== Members of Parliament ==
Election	Member	Party
1997	Clive Soley	Labour
2005	Andy Slaughter	Labour
2010	constituency abolished: see Hammersmith & Ealing Central and Acton	

== Elections ==
=== Elections in the 2000s ===
General election 2005: Ealing, Acton and Shepherd's Bush
Party	Candidate	Votes	%	±%
Labour	Andy Slaughter	16,579	41.8	−12.3
Conservative	Jonathan Gough	11,059	27.9	+2.8
Liberal Democrats	Gary Malcolm	9,986	25.2	+8.6
Green	Geoffrey Burgess	1,999	5.0	New
Majority		5,520	13.9	−15.1
Turnout		39,623	56.2	+3.6
Registered electors		75,886		
Labour hold		Swing	-7.5	

General election 2001: Ealing, Acton and Shepherd's Bush
Party	Candidate	Votes	%	±%
Labour	Clive Soley	20,144	54.1	−4.3
Conservative	Justine Greening	9,355	25.1	−0.7
Liberal Democrats	Martin Tod	6,171	16.6	+5.9
Socialist Alliance	Nick Grant	529	1.4	New
UKIP	George Lawrie	476	1.3	+0.5
Socialist Labour	Carlos Rule	301	0.8	−0.5
ProLife Alliance	Rebecca Ng	225	0.6	0.0
Majority		10,789	29.0	−3.6
Turnout		37,201	52.6	−14.1
Registered electors		75,886		
Labour hold		Swing	–1.8	

=== Elections in the 1990s ===
General election 1997: Ealing Acton and Shepherd's Bush
Party	Candidate	Votes	%	±%
Labour	Clive Soley	28,052	58.4	+10.0
Conservative	Barbara Yerolemou	12,405	25.8	–15.3
Liberal Democrats	Andrew Mitchell	5,163	10.7	+2.8
Referendum	Christopher Winn	637	1.3	New
Socialist Labour	Jack Gilbert	635	1.3	New
UKIP	Joseph Gomm	385	0.8	New
ProLife Alliance	Paul Danon	265	0.6	New
Glow Bowling Party	Christopher Beasley	209	0.4	New
Christian	William Edwards	163	0.3	New
Natural Law	Kevin Turner	150	0.3	New
Majority		15,647	32.6	+25.3
Turnout		48,064	66.7	–9.7
Registered electors		73,752		
Labour notional hold				

1992 notional result
Party	Vote	%
Labour	25,317	48.3
Conservative	21,503	41.1
Liberal Democrats	4,163	7.9
Others	1,385	2.6
Turnout	52,368	74.9
Electorate	69,959	

== See also ==
- Parliamentary constituencies in London
- Clive Soley
- Justine Greening
- Ealing Central and Acton
