= 1915 Uxbridge by-election =

UK Parliamentary by-election

The 1915 Uxbridge by-election was held on 10 November 1915. The by-election was held due to the Conservative MP, Charles Thomas Mills, being killed in action in the First World War. It was won by his brother, the Conservative candidate Arthur Mills, who was unopposed.

1915 Uxbridge by-election
Party	Candidate	Votes	%	±%
Unionist	Arthur Mills	Unopposed		
Unionist hold				
