= Hammersmith (UK Parliament constituency) =

UK Parliament constituency (2010–2024)

Coordinates: 51.51°N 0.23°W

- Former borough constituency for the House of Commons
- Boundary of Hammersmith in Greater London
- County: Greater London
- Electorate: 74,759 (December 2019)

2010–2024
- Seats: One
- Created from: Hammersmith and Fulham & Ealing, Acton and Shepherd's Bush
- Replaced by: Hammersmith and Chiswick

1983–1997
- Seats: One
- Created from: Hammersmith North
- Replaced by: Hammersmith and Fulham & Ealing, Acton and Shepherd's Bush

1885–1918
- Seats: One
- Created from: Chelsea
- Replaced by: Hammersmith North, Hammersmith South

Hammersmith was a parliamentary constituency (Note: A borough constituency (for the purposes of election expenses and type of returning officer)) in the House of Commons of the UK Parliament represented from 2010 until its abolition for the 2024 general election by Andy Slaughter, a member of the Labour Party. (Note: As with all constituencies, the constituency elects one Member of Parliament (MP) by the first past the post system of election at least every five years.)

Under the 2023 review of Westminster constituencies, the majority of the constituency was incorporated into the newly created seat of Hammersmith and Chiswick.

== Boundaries ==
Map of boundaries 2010-2024

=== 1885–1918 ===
1885–1918: The parishes of St Peter and St Paul, Hammersmith.

The parliamentary borough of Hammersmith was created by the Redistribution of Seats Act 1885 and consisted of the civil parish of Hammersmith (in Middlesex only until 1889 when it fell within the approximately 30,000 acres (120 km^{2}) that became part of the County of London under the Local Government Act 1888). Like almost all seats created from 1885 it returned one Member of Parliament. This was the first parliamentary constituency to be based on the town, which from 1868 to 1885 was at the westernmost part of Chelsea and previously had been part of the parliamentary county of Middlesex. In 1900 the Metropolitan Borough of Hammersmith was formed, but this did not affect the constituency's boundaries.

The seat bordered to the west the Ealing seat, to the north the large Harrow division of Middlesex seat, to the east Kensington North and Kensington South and to the south the large Kingston division of Surrey and, to the southeast, Fulham. In 1918 the Hammersmith constituency was divided into Hammersmith North and Hammersmith South constituencies.

=== 1983–1997 ===
The second parliamentary borough constituency of Hammersmith was created in 1983. By then the area was part of Greater London and the London Borough of Hammersmith and Fulham (both created in 1965). The constituency consisted of ten wards of the London borough, namely Addison, Broadway, Brook Green, College Park and Old Oak, Coningham, Grove, Ravenscourt, Starch Green, White City and Shepherds Bush, and Wormholt. The seat was entirely formed from the previous Hammersmith North constituency.

BBC Television Centre, Shepherd's Bush Market and the Hammersmith Apollo was in this version of the constituency for its 14-year existence, however Westfield London shopping centre had not yet been built.

The constituency was abolished in 1997 and mostly replaced by Hammersmith and Fulham. A northern slice of the seat became part of Ealing, Acton and Shepherd's Bush. The new Hammersmith and Fulham constituency included the town centres of both Hammersmith and Fulham.

=== 2010–2024 ===
Following a review of parliamentary boundaries in North London, the Boundary Commission for England recreated the Hammersmith constituency for the 2010 general election, following major changes in the London Borough of Hammersmith and Fulham. The review also created new seats of Chelsea and Fulham and Kensington.

The 2010 Hammersmith constituency was made up of the following ten electoral wards of the London Borough of Hammersmith and Fulham: Addison, Askew, Avonmore and Brook Green, College Park and Old Oak, Fulham Reach, Hammersmith Broadway, North End, Ravenscourt Park, Shepherds Bush Green, and Wormholt and White City.

The 2005 notional result was Labour 44.6%, Conservative 31.1% and Liberal Democrat 19.2%.

== Constituency profile ==
The constituency includes the western part of the London Borough of Hammersmith and Fulham, stretching from Wormwood Scrubs down to the River Thames. It takes in the commercial and business hub of Hammersmith itself, parts of northwestern Fulham, the western part of Earl's Court (the Exhibition Centre itself straddles the boundary between this constituency and the Kensington seat), West Kensington, Shepherd's Bush, and White City. The seat has northern areas with a much higher proportion of social housing dependency than the London average and overall this leads to the seat having slightly higher rates of unemployment and underemployment.

In 1981, 18.2% of the population was non-White.

Political history since 2010

The Labour Party candidate took a marginal majority of 7.5% of the vote in 2010. Slaughter's majority in 2015, 13.6%, made it the 156th safest of the party's 232 seats by percentage of majority. In 2017, Slaughter increased his majority to 35.7%. In 2019, Slaughter's majority slipped slightly to 34.4%

== Members of Parliament ==
Election	Member	Party	Notes
1885	Walter Tuckfield Goldsworthy	Conservative	
1900	William Bull	Conservative	
1918	Constituency abolished: see Hammersmith North and Hammersmith South		
1983	Clive Soley	Labour	previously MP for Hammersmith North 1979–1983, later Baron Soley
1997	Constituency abolished: see Hammersmith and Fulham		
2010	Andy Slaughter	Labour	previously MP for Ealing, Acton and Shepherd's Bush 2005–2010

== Election results ==
=== Elections in the 2010s ===
2019 general election: Hammersmith
Party	Candidate	Votes	%	±%
Labour	Andy Slaughter	30,074	57.9	−6.0
Conservative	Xingang Wang	12,227	23.5	−4.7
Liberal Democrats	Jessie Venegas	6,947	13.4	+8.0
Green	Alex Horn	1,744	3.4	+1.9
Brexit Party	James Keyse	974	1.9	New
Majority		17,847	34.4	−1.3
Turnout		51,966	69.8	−2.0
Registered electors		74,759		
Labour hold		Swing	−0.7	

2017 general election: Hammersmith
Party	Candidate	Votes	%	±%
Labour	Andy Slaughter	33,375	63.9	+13.9
Conservative	Charlie Dewhirst	14,724	28.2	−8.2
Liberal Democrats	Joyce Onstad	2,802	5.4	+0.8
Green	Alex Horn	800	1.5	−2.9
UKIP	Jack Bovill	507	1.0	−3.4
Independent	Jagdeosingh Hauzaree	44	0.1	New
Majority		18,651	35.7	+22.1
Turnout		52,252	71.8	+5.4
Registered electors		72,803		
Labour hold		Swing	+11.0	

2015 general election: Hammersmith
Party	Candidate	Votes	%	±%
Labour	Andy Slaughter	23,981	50.0	+6.1
Conservative	Charlie Dewhirst	17,463	36.4	0.0
Liberal Democrats	Millicent Scott	2,224	4.6	−11.3
Green	David Akan	2,105	4.4	+2.9
UKIP	Richard Wood	2,105	4.4	+3.2
Independent	Stephen Brennan	82	0.2	New
Majority		6,518	13.6	+6.1
Turnout		47,960	66.4	+0.8
Registered electors		72,254		
Labour hold		Swing	+3.0	

2010 general election: Hammersmith
Party	Candidate	Votes	%	±%
Labour	Andy Slaughter*	20,810	43.9	–1.2
Conservative	Shaun Bailey	17,261	36.4	+2.9
Liberal Democrats	Merlene Emerson	7,567	15.9	–2.7
Green	Rollo Miles	696	1.5	New
UKIP	Vanessa Crichton	551	1.2	New
BNP	James Searle	432	0.9	New
Independent	Stephen Brennan	135	0.3	New
Majority		3,549	7.5	–4.1
Turnout		47,452	65.6	+5.7
Registered electors		72,348		
Labour win (new seat)				

* Served as an MP in the 2005–2010 Parliament for the seat of Ealing, Acton and Shepherd's Bush

2005 notional result
Party	Vote	%
Labour	18,409	45.1
Conservative	13,676	33.5
Liberal Democrats	7,622	18.7
Others	1,132	2.8
Turnout	40,839	59.9
Electorate	68,198	

=== Election results 1983–1992 ===
1992 general election: Hammersmith
Party	Candidate	Votes	%	±%
Labour	Clive Soley	17,329	51.0	+6.0
Conservative	Tony Hennessey	12,575	37.0	−1.1
Liberal Democrats	John Bates	3,380	10.0	−4.9
Green	Roger Crosskey	546	1.6	+0.3
Natural Law	Kevin Turner	89	0.3	New
Anti-Federalist League	Helen Szamuely	41	0.1	New
Majority		4,754	14.0	+7.1
Turnout		33,960	71.5	−1.2
Registered electors		47,229		
Labour hold		Swing	+3.6	

1987 general election: Hammersmith
Party	Candidate	Votes	%	±%
Labour	Clive Soley	15,811	45.0	+3.5
Conservative	Nirj Deva	13,396	38.1	+2.6
Liberal	Simon Knott	5,241	14.9	+9.1
Green	David Kirk	453	1.3	+0.3
Red Front	John Fitzpatrick	125	0.4	New
Humanist	Melanie Carrick	98	0.3	New
Majority		2,415	6.9	+0.9
Turnout		35,124	72.7	+1.5
Registered electors		48,285		
Labour hold		Swing		

1983 general election: Hammersmith
Party	Candidate	Votes	%	±%
Labour	Clive Soley	13,645	41.5	−6.7
Conservative	Nick Mansfield	11,691	35.5	−2.9
SDP	Michael Starks	4,925	15.0	New
Liberal	Simon Knott	1,912	5.8	−5.8
Ecology	Deborah Sutherland	325	1.0	New
National Front	Lilian Bennett	250	0.8	−0.5
Workers Revolutionary	Claire Dixon	81	0.3	−0.3
Independent	Peter Dick	73	0.2	New
Majority		1,954	5.9	−3.9
Turnout		32,902	71.3	
Registered electors		46,178		
Labour win (new seat)				

- Both Starks and Knott were official candidates of their respective local parties and both supported the Alliance between the Liberals and the SDP, however Starks was given endorsement by both the national parties.

1979 notional result
Party	Vote	%
Labour	17,241	48.2
Conservative	13,735	38.4
Liberal	4,147	11.6
Others	655	1.8
Turnout	35,778	
Electorate		

=== Election Results 1885–1918 ===
==== Elections in the 1910s ====
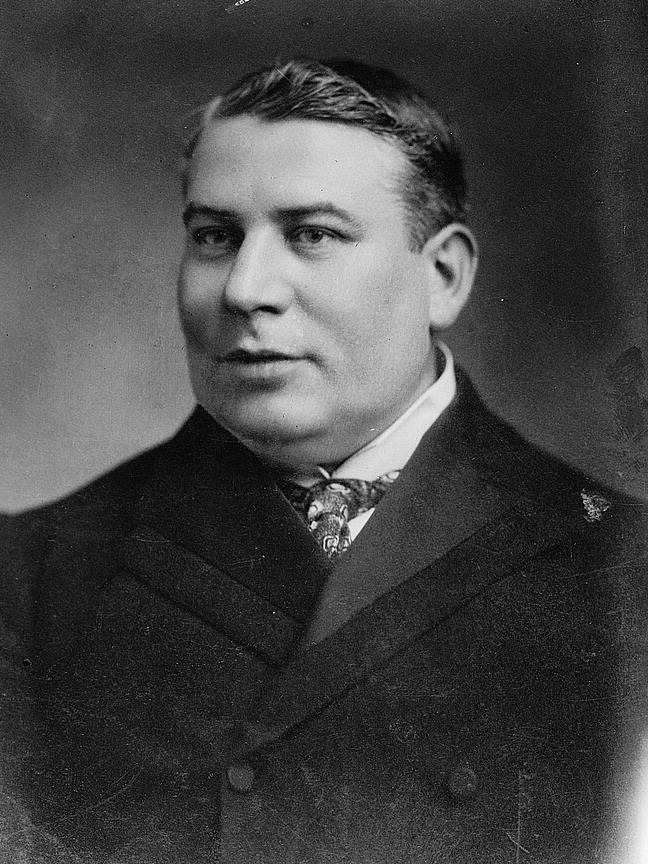
Sir W.J. Bull

December 1910 general election: Hammersmith
Party	Candidate	Votes	%	±%
Conservative	William Bull	5,807	55.6	+1.0
Liberal	George Blaiklock	4,645	44.4	−1.0
Majority		1,162	11.2	+2.0
Turnout		10,452	72.8	−13.2
Registered electors		14,362		
Conservative hold		Swing	+1.0	

January 1910 general election: Hammersmith
Party	Candidate	Votes	%	±%
Conservative	William Bull	6,668	54.6	+6.2
Liberal	George Blaiklock	5,542	45.4	+2.2
Majority		1,126	9.2	+4.0
Turnout		12,210	85.0	+9.6
Registered electors		14,362		
Conservative hold		Swing	+4.2	

==== Elections in the 1900s ====
1906 general election: Hammersmith
Party	Candidate	Votes	%	±%
Conservative	William Bull	5,111	48.4	−23.2
Liberal	George Blaiklock	4,562	43.2	+14.8
Independent Labour	George Belt	885	8.4	New
Majority		549	5.2	−38.0
Turnout		10,558	75.4	+17.0
Registered electors		14,007		
Conservative hold		Swing	−19.0	

1900 general election: Hammersmith
Party	Candidate	Votes	%	±%
Conservative	William Bull	5,458	71.6	+10.8
Liberal	Michael Emil Lange	2,166	28.4	−10.8
Majority		3,292	43.2	+21.6
Turnout		7,624	58.4	−8.3
Registered electors		13,064		
Conservative hold		Swing	+10.8	

==== Elections in the 1890s ====
W.C. Steadman

1895 general election: Hammersmith
Party	Candidate	Votes	%	±%
Conservative	Walter Goldsworthy	5,017	60.8	+6.7
Lib-Lab	W. C. Steadman	3,238	39.2	−6.7
Majority		1,779	21.6	+13.4
Turnout		8,255	66.7	−3.6
Registered electors		12,378		
Conservative hold		Swing	+6.7	

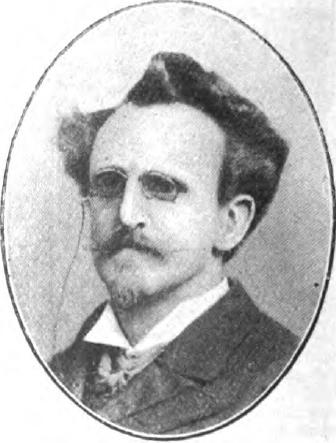
Frank Smith

1892 general election: Hammersmith
Party	Candidate	Votes	%	±%
Conservative	Walter Goldsworthy	4,387	54.1	−8.7
Lib-Lab	Frank Smith	3,718	45.9	+8.7
Majority		669	8.2	−17.4
Turnout		8,105	70.3	+4.2
Registered electors		11,534		
Conservative hold		Swing	-8.7	

==== Elections in the 1880s ====
1886 general election: Hammersmith
Party	Candidate	Votes	%	±%
Conservative	Walter Goldsworthy	3,991	62.8	+4.9
Liberal	Frank Dethridge	2,362	37.2	−4.9
Majority		1,629	25.6	+9.8
Turnout		6,353	66.1	−10.5
Registered electors		9,611		
Conservative hold		Swing	+4.9	

1885 general election: Hammersmith
Party	Candidate	Votes	%	±%
Conservative	Walter Goldsworthy	4,264	57.9	
Liberal	Thomas Chatfeild Clarke	3,095	42.1	
Majority		1,169	15.8	
Turnout		7,359	76.6	
Registered electors		9,611		
Conservative win (new seat)				

== See also ==
- parliamentary constituencies in London
- Hammersmith and Fulham
