= 1972 Uxbridge by-election =

Election in the United Kingdom

The 1972 Uxbridge by-election was held on 7 December 1972 after Conservative Member of Parliament (MP) Charles Curran had died on 16 September of the same year. The seat was retained for the Conservatives by Michael Shersby. Shersby would hold the seat until his sudden death just days after the 1997 general election.

== Candidates ==
The by-election was contested by seven candidates, with each of the three major parliamentary parties offering candidates, three others coming from extra-parliamentary right-wing groups and a final candidate who was effectively an independent.

John Clifton was the candidate for the far-right National Front. He was the party's organiser for South-West London and was also close to the local branch of the Monday Club.

Dennis Herbert Harmston ran for the Union Movement, a far-right pro-European unity party led by Oswald Mosley. Known as "Big Dan", Harmston, who worked in the management of Smithfield Market, was a long-term supporter of Mosley. He later became known as a supporter of Enoch Powell, leading the Smithfield porters in a pro-Powell march following the Rivers of Blood speech.

Another fringe rightist party, the National Independence Party, also stood with Clare Macdonald as their candidate. Macdonald had been a member of the National Front but had switched allegiance when former Front leader John O'Brien was forced out of the group.

Michael Shersby was the candidate for the Conservative Party. He had worked in industry for a number of years with the sugar company Tate & Lyle whilst also serving as a Conservative member of Westminster City Council.

Reginald Simmerson ran under the title "Democratic Conservative against the Common Market". Simmerson was a regular by-election candidate who campaigned against British membership of the European Community. Following his death in 1998 the Anti-Common Market League established a prize in his memory.

Ian Stuart was the candidate for the Liberal Party. A cargo-handler by profession and the chairman of the Joint Shop Stewards Liaison Committee, he was educated at Lewes Old Grammar School.

Manuela Sykes was chosen as the candidate for the Labour Party. Sykes had been a long-standing member of the Liberal Party and had been a candidate for them in a number of parliamentary elections before defecting to Labour. She too served as a member of Westminster Council.

== Result ==
The Conservatives retained the seat, albeit with a reduced majority and vote share. However the by-election was more noted for the comparatively high share won by the National Front in what was their "first dramatic by-election result". The party had campaigned at unprecedented levels, bringing in as many as 100 canvassers to get their message out to voters.

Uxbridge by-Election, 1972
Party	Candidate	Votes	%	±%
Conservative	Michael Shersby	14,178	42.31	−7.04
Labour	Manuela Sykes	13,000	38.79	−2.87
Liberal	Ian Stuart	3,650	10.89	+1.90
National Front	John Clifton	2,920	8.71	New
Union Movement	Dan Harmston	873	2.60	New
National Independence	Clare Macdonald	551	1.64	New
Democratic Conservative against the Common Market	Reginald Simmerson	341	1.02	New
Majority		1,178	3.52	−4.16
Turnout		35,513		
Conservative hold		Swing	-2.08	
