= Charles Mills (Uxbridge MP) =

British politician and WWI officer (1887–1915)

The Honourable Charles Mills
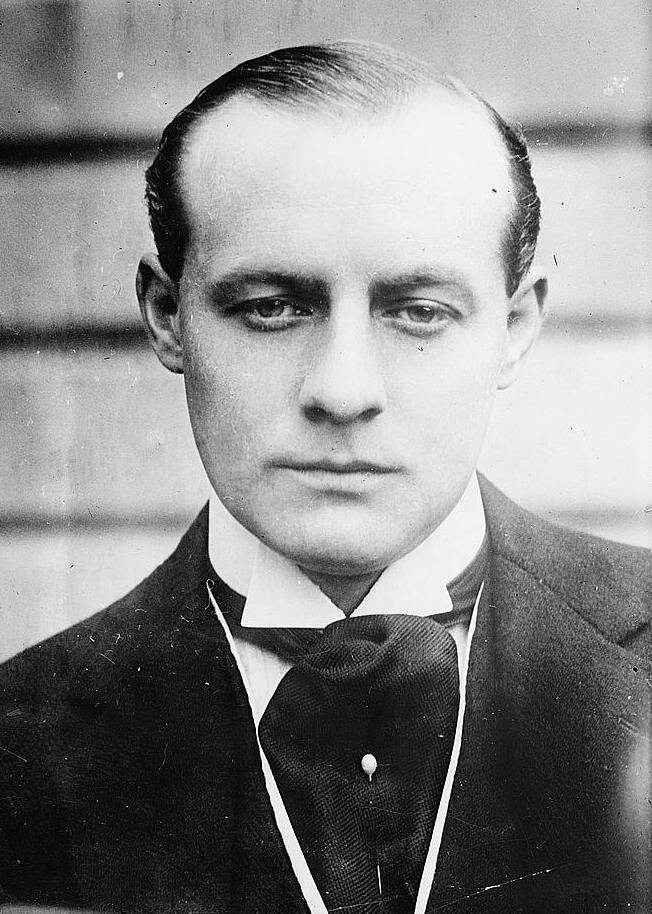
- Mills circa 1913

Member of Parliament for Uxbridge
- In office 1910–1915
- Preceded by: Sir Frederick Dixon-Hartland
- Succeeded by: Arthur Mills

Personal details
- Born: Charles Thomas Mills; 13 March 1887
- Died: 6 October 1915 (aged 28) Hulluch, France
- Party: Conservative
- Parent: Charles William Mills, 2nd Baron Hillingdon (father)
- Relatives: Arthur Mills (brother)

Military service
- Allegiance: United Kingdom
- Branch/service: British Army
- Years of service: 1908–1915
- Rank: Lieutenant
- Unit: 2nd Battalion, Scots Guards
- Battles/wars: Battle of Loos

The Honourable Charles Thomas Mills (13 March 1887 – 6 October 1915) was Conservative Member of Parliament for Uxbridge, elected in January 1910 when he was the youngest MP. He was killed, serving as an officer with the Scots Guards on the Western Front.

== Biography ==
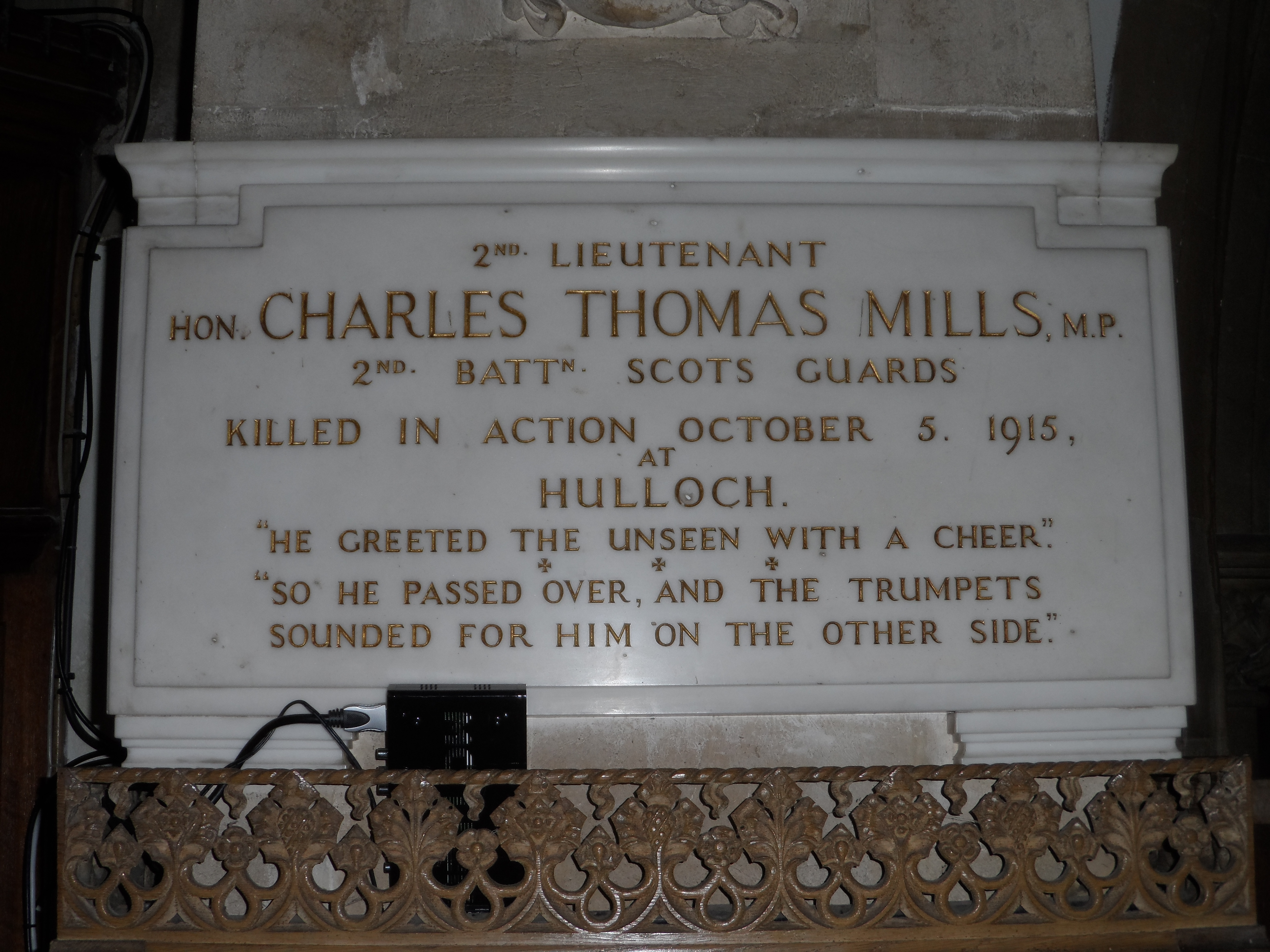
Memorial to Charles Thomas Mills in St John the Baptist's Church, Hillingdon

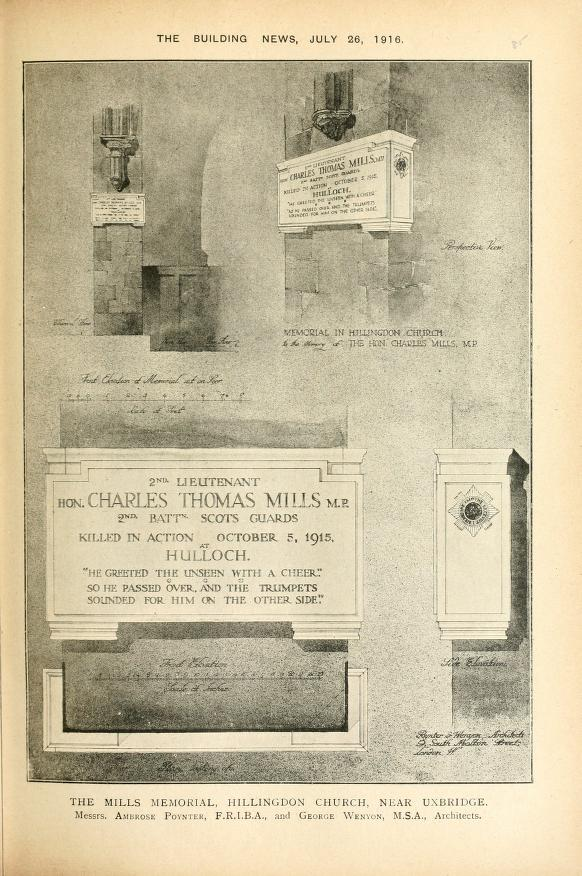
Architectural plans for the Mills memorial by Ambrose Macdonald Poynter and George Wenyon from The Building News 26 July 1916

Born on 13 March 1887, he was the eldest son of Charles William Mills, 2nd Baron Hillingdon (1855–1919) who served as Conservative Member of Parliament for Sevenoaks from 1885 to 1892, and his wife Alice Marion Harbord, daughter of Charles Harbord, 5th Baron Suffield. He processed at the coronation of Edward VII and Alexandra in 1902 with Lord Suffield who was Master of the Robes.

He was educated at The New Beacon, Eton College, and Magdalen College, Oxford He joined the family bank Glyn, Mills, Currie & Co. in 1910. He and his father were meant to be on the maiden voyage of the Titanic but stayed home due to his father's ill health.

Mills was elected Conservative Member of Parliament for the Uxbridge Division of Middlesex at the January 1910 general election and re-elected in the December 1910 election. In his first parliament, he was the 'Baby of the House', the youngest MP.

He was first commissioned as an army officer in April 1908 in the West Kent (Queen's Own) Yeomanry and promoted lieutenant in 1912. He transferred from the Territorial Force to the Scots Guards in May 1915. He was killed in action on 6 October 1915 at Hulluch during the Battle of Loos while a lieutenant with 2nd Battalion, the Scots Guards. He was unmarried.

As he has no known grave, Mills is commemorated on the Loos Memorial. He is also commemorated on Panel 8 of the Parliamentary War Memorial in Westminster Hall, one of 22 MPs who died fighting in the First World War; and by a plaque in Hillingdon's parish church. Mills is one of 19 MPs who fell in the war commemorated by heraldic shields in the Commons Chamber. A fifth commemoration is the production in 1932 of a manuscript-style illuminated book of remembrance for the House of Commons, which includes a short biographical account of his life and death.

The inscription on the memorial erected to his memory by his family in St John the Baptist's Church, Hillingdon contains two quotes: "He greeted the unseen with a cheer." (recalling a line from Robert Browning's poem Epilogue); and "So he passed over and the trumpets sounded for him on the other side." (from The Pilgrim's Progress by John Bunyan).

His brother Arthur Mills succeeded him, unopposed, as Member of Parliament for Uxbridge.

== Arms ==
Coat of arms of Charles Mills
Crest A demi-lion reguardant Or gorged with a collar gemel Azure between the paws a millrind Sable. Escutcheon Gyronny of eight Argent and Azure a millrind Sable. Supporters On either side a lion reguardant Or gorged with a collar gemel Azure charged on the shoulder with a cross flory Sable. Motto Nil Conscire Sibi

Parliament of the United Kingdom
Preceded by Sir Frederick Dixon-Hartland	Member of Parliament for Uxbridge; 1910–1915	Succeeded by Arthur Mills
