= John Randall, Baron Randall of Uxbridge =

British politician (born 1955)

The Right Honourable The Lord Randall of Uxbridge PC
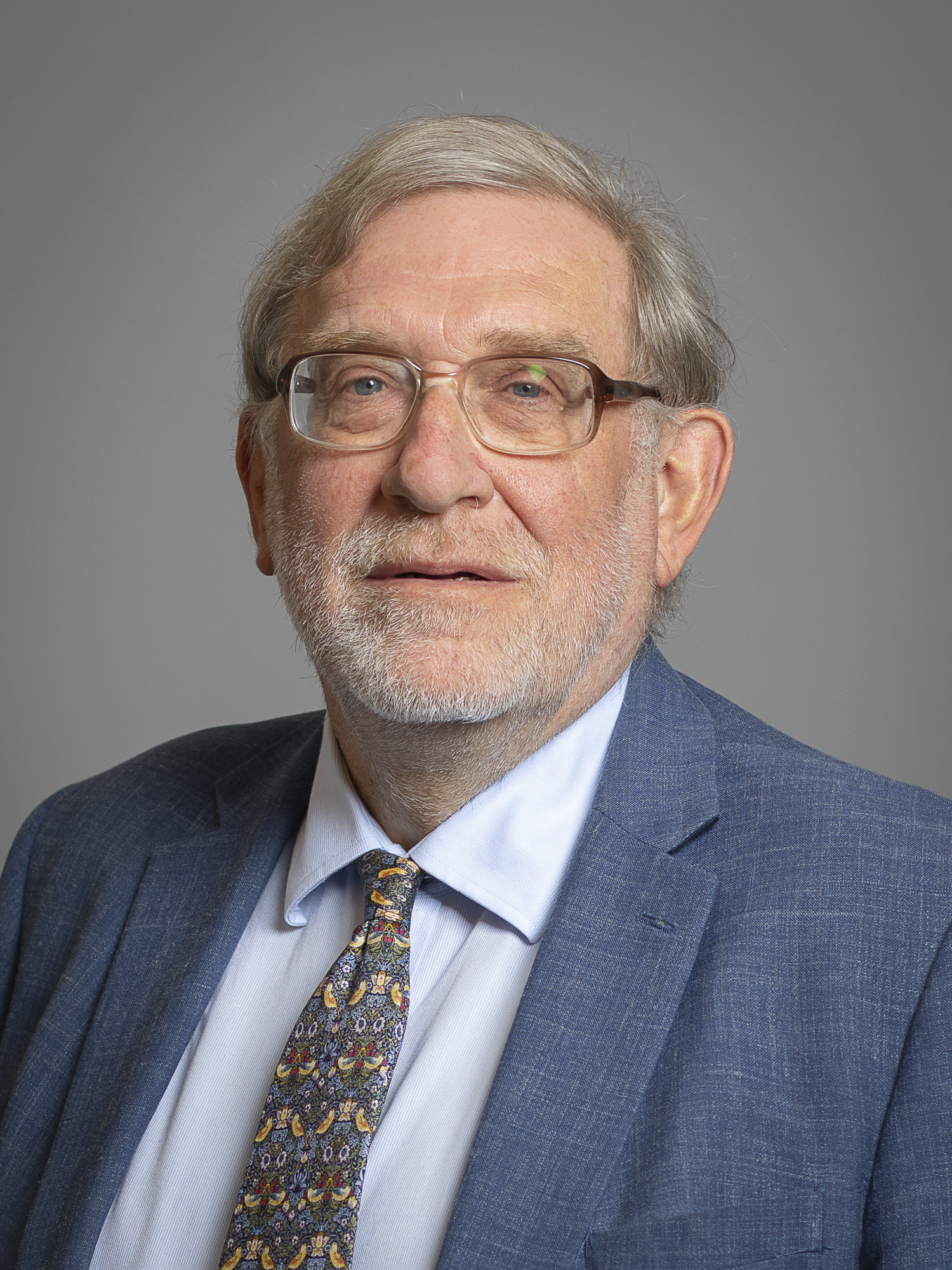
- Official portrait, 2020

Deputy Chief Whip of the House of Commons Treasurer of the Household
- In office 11 May 2010 – 6 October 2013
- Prime Minister: David Cameron
- Preceded by: Tommy McAvoy
- Succeeded by: Greg Hands

Member of the House of Lords
- Lord Temporal
- Life peerage 25 June 2018

Member of Parliament for Uxbridge and South Ruislip Uxbridge (1997–2010)
- In office 31 July 1997 – 30 March 2015
- Preceded by: Sir Michael Shersby
- Succeeded by: Boris Johnson

Personal details
- Born: 5 August 1955 (age 71) Uxbridge, Middlesex, England
- Party: Conservative
- Spouse: Kate
- Children: 3
- Education: University College London
- Profession: Businessman
- Website: Official website

Alexander John Randall, Baron Randall of Uxbridge, PC (born 5 August 1955) is a British politician who served as the Member of Parliament (MP) for Uxbridge from 1997 to 2010 and for Uxbridge and South Ruislip until 2015, before being awarded a life peerage in 2018. A member of the Conservative Party, he served as Government Deputy Chief Whip from May 2010 and October 2013, as well as Environment Adviser to Theresa May from 2017 to 2019.

Lord Randall is a trustee and Vice-Chair of the Human Trafficking Foundation and in February 2016 was appointed Special Envoy on modern slavery to the Mayor of London, alongside Anthony Steen.

== Early life ==
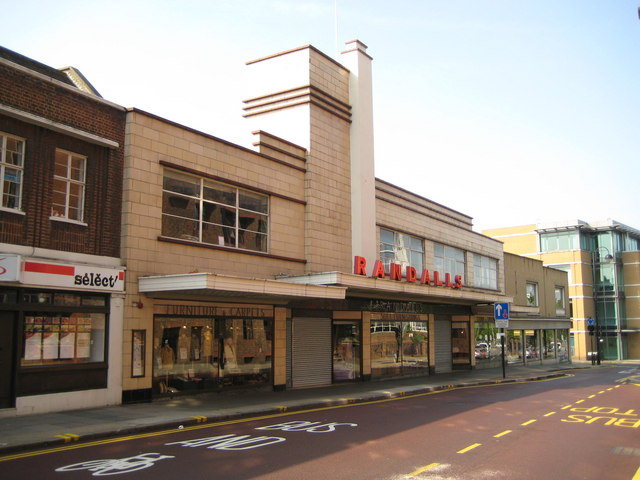
Randall's of Uxbridge

Randall's family have lived in Uxbridge for many years. The family owned the major local department store Randalls of Uxbridge on Vine Street, which was founded by his great-grandfather Philip Randall in 1891, and closed in 2015.

Born in Uxbridge, Randall was educated at Rutland House School, an independent school in Hillingdon in the west of Greater London and at Merchant Taylors' School in Moor Park, Hertfordshire. In 1979, he graduated from the School of Slavonic and East European Studies (which is now part of University College London) with an Upper Second Class Honours BA degree in Serbo-Croatian language and literature.

Randall later became managing director of Randall's and one of three shareholders in the business. In 1994, he became Honorary Treasurer of Uxbridge Conservative Association, which later elected him Chairman.

He announced in 2014 that the family store would close, citing decreased turnover and competition from online shopping as causes. Speaking about the closure, he criticised other employers for using zero-hours contracts to cut their costs.

== Parliamentary career ==
=== House of Commons ===
Randall was elected Member of Parliament for Uxbridge in a by-election following the death of Sir Michael Shersby in the wake of the Labour Party's 1997 landslide election victory. Randall had been an election agent for Shersby throughout the 1997 General Election campaign. He became the first Conservative candidate to win a parliamentary by-election since the party's recently elected leader William Hague's victory in Richmond in 1989.

During his political career he has sat on the Environment, Transport and Regional Affairs Select Committee and its Environment Sub-Committee. He is strongly against the expansion of Heathrow Airport.

In 1999 he was appointed as an Opposition Whip, but, due to his opposition to Britain's involvement in the Iraq War, he resigned as a matter of conscience in March 2003. He was later reappointed as a Whip in 2003. At the end of 2005 he was promoted to Conservative Assistant Chief Whip. In 2010 he was appointed the joint Deputy Chief Whip and Treasurer of Her Majesty's Household in the Coalition Government.

He was appointed as a Privy Counsellor on 9 June 2010.

He resigned from the government with praise to David Cameron on 6 October 2013, amid a cabinet reshuffle. On 21 October 2013 it was announced that he was to receive a knighthood, having the accolade bestowed by The Prince of Wales on 12 February 2014. On 10 July 2014, Randall announced that he would not be standing as a parliamentary candidate for the seat at the 2015 general election.

=== House of Lords ===
On 18 May 2018, it was announced he would be elevated to the House of Lords. On 25 June, he was created a life peer as Baron Randall of Uxbridge, of Uxbridge in the London Borough of Hillingdon.

== Outside Parliament ==
In February 2016 he was appointed Special Envoy on Modern Slavery to the Mayor of London, alongside Anthony Steen CBE. He is President of the Colne Valley Regional Park.

== Personal life ==
Lord Randall married Katherine Frances Gray in 1986; the couple have two sons and a daughter. Randall is a keen supporter of Uxbridge Football Club and Saracens Rugby Club.

Parliament of the United Kingdom
Preceded by Sir Michael Shersby	Member of Parliament for Uxbridge; 1997–2015	Succeeded by Boris Johnson
Political offices
Preceded by Tommy McAvoy	Treasurer of the Household; 2010–2013	Succeeded by Greg Hands
Party political offices
Preceded by Patrick McLoughlin	Conservative Deputy Chief Whip in the House of Commons; 2005–2013	Succeeded by Greg Hands
Orders of precedence in the United Kingdom
Preceded by The Lord Garnier	Gentlemen; Baron Randall of Uxbridge	Followed by The Lord Anderson of Ipswich
