= Michael Shersby =

British politician (1933–1997)

Sir Michael Shersby
- Shersby in 1994

Member of Parliament for Uxbridge
- In office 7 December 1972 – 8 May 1997
- Preceded by: Charles Curran
- Succeeded by: John Randall

Personal details
- Born: Julian Michael Shersby; 17 February 1933 Ickenham, Middlesex, England
- Died: 8 May 1997 (aged 64) London, England
- Party: Conservative
- Spouse: Barbara Barrow (m. 1958)
- Children: 2

Sir Julian Michael Shersby (17 February 1933 – 8 May 1997) was a British Conservative Party politician who was the member of parliament for Uxbridge from 1972 until his death.

== Early life ==
Shersby was born to William and Elinor Shersby (Nora, née Fuller) at their home 9 Court Road, Ickenham (a Greater London area later in his seat in the House of Commons) on 17 February 1933. Christened Julian Michael, he was known primarily as Michael by the age of ten. He had siblings: Dick (also known as Harold), Marjorie and Brian Shersby. His father advanced in the Port of London Authority to be a manager.

He attended Breakspear primary school and The John Lyon School, in Harrow. Shersby left school at 15, in 1948 starting work as a messenger in the City of London. He lived with family in Ickenham until at 25 he married Barbara Barrow of West Drayton and they moved to London. He qualified as a trained Conservative party agent during the 1950s and worked in that capacity during his early 20s before joining the industrial film industry between 1958 and 1966. Between 1966 and 1988 he was Director General of the British Sugar Bureau, the industry's trade association.

== Career ==
Shersby's career as an elected political representative began in 1959 when he was first elected as a borough councillor on Paddington Borough Council for Maida Vale North ward and he then continued to serve for the Maida Vale ward of Westminster City Council from 1964 to 1970 after Paddington was subsumed into the new larger unitary council's area. He served as deputy lord mayor on Westminster City Council from 1967 to 1968.

On 7 December 1972, Shersby was elected to Parliament at a by-election triggered by the death of Uxbridge MP Charles Curran, who had re-taken the seat for the Conservatives from Labour's John Ryan in the 1970 general election. Shersby was not expected to win the by-election, as it was considered a marginal seat; it occurred the same day as another by-election in Sutton and Cheam, in which the Conservatives lost a seat they had held in 1970 with a larger majority.

He received an Honorary Doctorate from Brunel University in 1994 and was knighted in 1995 for his longstanding years of service in Parliament.

== Private members' bills ==
Since at least 1920s he holds a record as the parliamentarian who has introduced the most of their own tabled bills (eight) to become law. Many of these he was the named sponsor, to bring attention to their importance, thus survive tight parliamentary timetabling rules.

Resulting Acts

- Town and Country Amenities Act 1974
- Parks Regulation (Amendment) Act 1974
- Stock Exchange (Completion of Bargains) Act 1975–76
- Gaming (Amendment) Act 1979–80
- Copyright Act 1956 (Amendment) Act 1981–82
- British Nationality (Falkland Islands) 1982–83
- Firearms (Amendment) 1993–94
- Pharmacists (Fitness To Practice) Act 1996–97

== Hillsborough disaster ==
As Parliamenty Adviser to the Police Federation, Shersby was invited to assist in the development of a 'counterattack' to 'repudiate' Lord Justice Taylor's Interim Report, which had condemned the evidence and testimony of senior police officers and rejected as exaggerated the allegations made against Liverpool fans. Taylor LJ stated categorically that fans' behaviour played no part in the disaster. The Police Federation considered the Interim Report unfair and unbalanced. His acts, if any, as Parliamentary Adviser to the Police Federation following the Hillsborough disaster, per the Hillsborough Independent Panel's report, are unknown.

== Personal life and death ==
Shersby's grave

Shersby married Barbara Barrow in 1958, and they had two children, Julian and Lucy. Lucy stood as Conservative Parliamentary candidate for Battersea in the 2001 general election but was not elected, while Julian served as a Conservative councillor on Mole Valley District Council between 1999 and 2006.

Shersby died of a heart attack in London on 8 May 1997, at the age of 64, only seven days after being re-elected to Parliament in the 1997 general election. The resulting by-election was won by local department store owner John Randall.

Shersby is buried in the churchyard of Harefield parish church. His epitaph is: "He demanded little, and gave much".

== Bibliography ==
- Leigh Rayment's Historical List of MPs
- Times Guide to the House of Commons, 1997

Parliament of the United Kingdom
Preceded by Charles Curran	Member of Parliament for Uxbridge; 1972–1997	Succeeded by John Randall
