= List of MPs elected in the 2005 United Kingdom general election =

2005–2010 Parliament of the United Kingdom
| ← | 2001–2005 Parliament | 2010–2015 Parliament | → |
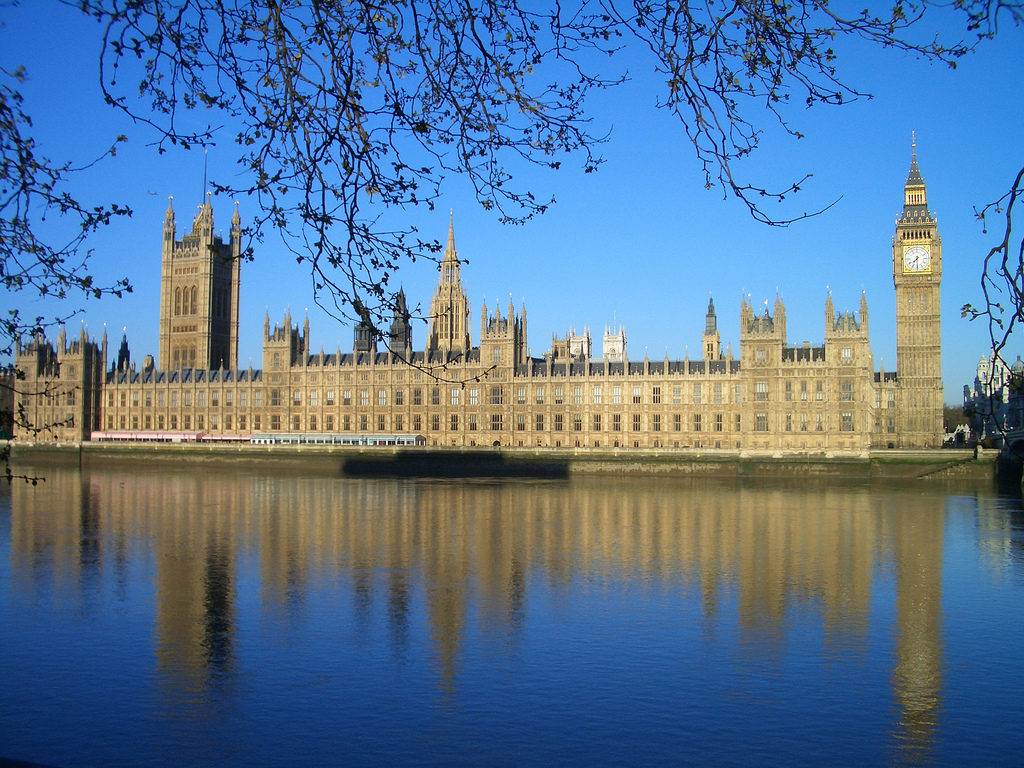
- Palace of Westminster in 2005

Overview
- Legislative body: Parliament of the United Kingdom
- Term: 11 May 2005 – 8 April 2010
- Election: 2005 United Kingdom general election
- Government: Third Blair ministry (until 27 June 2007); Brown ministry (from 27 June 2007)

House of Commons
- Members: 646
- Speaker: Michael Martin; John Bercow
- Leader: Geoff Hoon; Jack Straw; Harriet Harman
- Prime Minister: Tony Blair; Gordon Brown
- Deputy Prime Minister: John Prescott
- Leader of the Opposition: Michael Howard; David Cameron
- Third-party leader: Charles Kennedy; Menzies Campbell; Vince Cable; Nick Clegg

House of Lords
- Lord Chancellor: Baron Falconer of Thoroton (until 2007); Jack Straw (from 2007)
- Lord Speaker: The Baroness Hayman (from 2006)
- Leader of the House of Lords: Baroness Amos (until 2007); Baroness Ashton of Upholland (2007–2008); Baroness Royall of Blaisdon (from 2008)
- Deputy leader of the House of Lords: Baron Rooker (until 2008); Baron Hunt of Kings Heath (from 2008)

Crown-in-Parliament Queen Elizabeth II

Sessions
- 1st: 11 May 2005 – 8 November 2006
- 2nd: 15 November 2006 – 30 October 2007
- 3rd: 6 November 2007 – 26 November 2008
- 4th: 3 December 2008 – 12 November 2009
- 5th: 18 November 2009 – 8 April 2010

This is a list of members of Parliament (MPs) elected to the House of Commons at the 2005 general election, held on 5 May. The list is arranged by constituency. New MPs elected since the general election and changes in party allegiance are noted at the bottom of the page.

During the 2005–2010 Parliament, Michael Martin and John Bercow served as Speaker of the Commons, Lady Hayman served as Lord Speaker, Tony Blair and Gordon Brown served as Prime Minister, and Michael Howard and David Cameron served as Leader of the Opposition. This Parliament was dissolved on 12 April 2010.

== Composition of the 2005–2010 UK Parliament ==
These representative diagrams show the composition of the parties in Parliament. The first show the composition immediately after the 2005 general election, and the second shows the composition before the 2010 general election.

Note: The Scottish National Party and Plaid Cymru sat together as a party group, while Sinn Féin did not take its seats. This is not the official seating plan of the House of Commons, which has five rows of benches on each side, with the government party to the right of the speaker and opposition parties to the left, but with room for only around two-thirds of MPs to sit at any one time.

| Affiliation | Election | At dissolution |
|---|---|---|
| Labour Party | 355 | 349 |
| Conservative Party | 198 | 193 |
| Liberal Democrats | 62 | 63 |
| Democratic Unionist Party | 9 | 8 |
| Scottish National Party | 6 | 7 |
| Sinn Féin | 5 | 5 |
| Plaid Cymru | 3 | 3 |
| Social Democratic and Labour Party | 3 | 3 |
| Ulster Unionist Party | 1 | 0 |
| Health Concern | 1 | 1 |
| Respect – The Unity Coalition | 1 | 1 |
| Independent (Peter Law; Dai Davies, Sylvia Hermon, Andrew Pelling, Bob Spink, Bob Wareing) | 1 | 5 |
| Independent Labour (Clare Short) | 0 | 1 |
| Suspended Labour (Elliot Morley, David Chaytor, Jim Devine) | 0 | 3 |
| Suspended Conservative (Derek Conway) | 0 | 1 |
| Speaker | 1 | 1 |
| Vacant (North West Leicestershire, Strangford and Middlesbrough South and East Cleveland) | 0 | 3 |
| Total | 646 | 646 |
| Notional government majority | 66 | 38 |
| Working government majority | 71 | 48 |

Note: The effective Government majority was higher than the notional majority, because MPs from Sinn Féin did not take their seats due to their long-standing policy of abstentionism and vacant seats have no vote. Technically, the speakers belong to parties in a notional majority, though they do not usually vote and therefore don't figure in an effective majority.

== List of MPs elected in the general election ==
The following table is a list of MPs elected on 5 May 2005, ordered by constituency. The previous MP and previous party column shows the MP and party holding the seat at dissolution on 11 April 2005.

Note that most Scottish constituency boundaries were considerably changed from the previous general election, due to a decrease in the number of Scottish seats from 72 to 59. In this case, the previous MPs cannot be shown, and the previous party column shows the notional winner of the new seat, based on analysis of the 2001 general election result.

Key to changes since general election:

^{a} = change in party allegiance
^{b} = by-election

Table of contents:

A B C D E F G H I J K L M N O P Q R S T U V W X Y Z Changes

== A ==
| Constituency | Elected MP | Elected party | Previous MP | Previous party |
| Aberavon | Hywel Francis | Labour | Hywel Francis | Labour |
| Aberdeen North | Frank Doran | Labour | (boundary changes) | Labour |
| Aberdeen South | Anne Begg | Labour | (boundary changes) | Labour |
| Airdrie and Shotts | John Reid | Labour | (boundary changes) | Labour |
| Aldershot | Gerald Howarth | Conservative | Gerald Howarth | Conservative |
| Aldridge-Brownhills | Richard Shepherd | Conservative | Richard Shepherd | Conservative |
| Altrincham and Sale West | Graham Brady | Conservative | Graham Brady | Conservative |
| Alyn and Deeside | Mark Tami | Labour | Mark Tami | Labour |
| Amber Valley | Judy Mallaber | Labour | Judy Mallaber | Labour |
| Angus | Michael Weir | Scottish National Party | (boundary changes) | Scottish National Party |
| Argyll and Bute | Alan Reid | Liberal Democrat | (boundary changes) | Liberal Democrat |
| Arundel and South Downs | Nick Herbert | Conservative | Howard Flight | Conservative |
| Ashfield | Geoff Hoon | Labour | Geoff Hoon | Labour |
| Ashford | Damian Green | Conservative | Damian Green | Conservative |
| Ashton-under-Lyne | David Heyes | Labour | David Heyes | Labour |
| Aylesbury | David Lidington | Conservative | David Lidington | Conservative |
| Ayr, Carrick and Cumnock | Sandra Osborne | Labour | (boundary changes) | Labour |
=== B ===
| Constituency | Elected MP | Elected party | Previous MP | Previous party |
| Banbury | Tony Baldry | Conservative | Tony Baldry | Conservative |
| Banff and Buchan | Alex Salmond | Scottish National Party | (boundary changes) | Scottish National Party |
| Barking | Margaret Hodge | Labour | Margaret Hodge | Labour |
| Barnsley Central | Eric Illsley | Labour | Eric Illsley | Labour |
| Barnsley East and Mexborough | Jeff Ennis | Labour | Jeff Ennis | Labour |
| Barnsley West and Penistone | Michael Clapham | Labour | Michael Clapham | Labour |
| Barrow and Furness | John Hutton | Labour | John Hutton | Labour |
| Basildon | Angela Smith | Labour/Co-operative | Angela Smith | Labour/Co-operative |
| Basingstoke | Maria Miller | Conservative | Andrew Hunter | Democratic Unionist (Elected as Conservative) |
| Bassetlaw | John Mann | Labour | John Mann | Labour |
| Bath | Don Foster | Liberal Democrat | Don Foster | Liberal Democrat |
| Batley and Spen | Mike Wood | Labour | Mike Wood | Labour |
| Battersea | Martin Linton | Labour | Martin Linton | Labour |
| Beaconsfield | Dominic Grieve | Conservative | Dominic Grieve | Conservative |
| Beckenham | Jacqui Lait | Conservative | Jacqui Lait | Conservative |
| Bedford | Patrick Hall | Labour | Patrick Hall | Labour |
| Belfast East | Peter Robinson | Democratic Unionist | Peter Robinson | Democratic Unionist |
| Belfast North | Nigel Dodds | Democratic Unionist | Nigel Dodds | Democratic Unionist |
| Belfast South | Alasdair McDonnell | Social Democratic and Labour | The Rev. Martin Smyth | Ulster Unionist |
| Belfast West | Gerry Adams | Sinn Féin | Gerry Adams | Sinn Féin |
| Berwick-upon-Tweed | Alan Beith | Liberal Democrat | Alan Beith | Liberal Democrat |
| Berwickshire, Roxburgh and Selkirk | Michael Moore | Liberal Democrat | (boundary changes) | Liberal Democrat |
| Bethnal Green and Bow | George Galloway | RESPECT | Oona King | Labour |
| Beverley and Holderness | Graham Stuart | Conservative | James Cran | Conservative |
| Bexhill and Battle | Gregory Barker | Conservative | Gregory Barker | Conservative |
| Bexleyheath and Crayford | David Evennett | Conservative | Nigel Beard | Labour |
| Billericay | John Baron | Conservative | John Baron | Conservative |
| Birkenhead | Frank Field | Labour | Frank Field | Labour |
| Birmingham, Edgbaston | Gisela Stuart | Labour | Gisela Stuart | Labour |
| Birmingham, Erdington | Siôn Simon | Labour | Siôn Simon | Labour |
| Birmingham, Hall Green | Stephen McCabe | Labour | Stephen McCabe | Labour |
| Birmingham, Hodge Hill | Liam Byrne | Labour | Liam Byrne | Labour |
| Birmingham, Ladywood | Clare Short | Labour ^{a} | Clare Short | Labour |
| Birmingham, Northfield | Richard Burden | Labour | Richard Burden | Labour |
| Birmingham, Perry Barr | Khalid Mahmood | Labour | Khalid Mahmood | Labour |
| Birmingham, Selly Oak | Dr Lynne Jones | Labour | Dr Lynne Jones | Labour |
| Birmingham, Sparkbrook and Small Heath | Roger Godsiff | Labour | Roger Godsiff | Labour |
| Birmingham, Yardley | John Hemming | Liberal Democrat | Estelle Morris | Labour |
| Bishop Auckland | Helen Goodman | Labour | Derek Foster | Labour |
| Blaby | Andrew Robathan | Conservative | Andrew Robathan | Conservative |
| Blackburn | Jack Straw | Labour | Jack Straw | Labour |
| Blackpool North and Fleetwood | Joan Humble | Labour | Joan Humble | Labour |
| Blackpool South | Gordon Marsden | Labour | Gordon Marsden | Labour |
| Blaenau Gwent ^{b} | Peter Law | Independent | Llew Smith | Labour |
| Blaydon | David Anderson | Labour | John David McWilliam | Labour |
| Blyth Valley | Ronnie Campbell | Labour | Ronnie Campbell | Labour |
| Bognor Regis and Littlehampton | Nick Gibb | Conservative | Nick Gibb | Conservative |
| Bolsover | Dennis Skinner | Labour | Dennis Skinner | Labour |
| Bolton North East | David Crausby | Labour | David Crausby | Labour |
| Bolton South East | Dr Brian Iddon | Labour | Dr Brian Iddon | Labour |
| Bolton West | Ruth Kelly | Labour | Ruth Kelly | Labour |
| Bootle | Joe Benton | Labour | Joe Benton | Labour |
| Boston and Skegness | Mark Simmonds | Conservative | Mark Simmonds | Conservative |
| Bosworth | David Tredinnick | Conservative | David Tredinnick | Conservative |
| Bournemouth East | Tobias Ellwood | Conservative | David Atkinson | Conservative |
| Bournemouth West | John Butterfill | Conservative | John Butterfill | Conservative |
| Bracknell | Andrew MacKay | Conservative | Andrew MacKay | Conservative |
| Bradford North | Terry Rooney | Labour | Terry Rooney | Labour |
| Bradford South | Gerry Sutcliffe | Labour | Gerry Sutcliffe | Labour |
| Bradford West | Marsha Singh | Labour | Marsha Singh | Labour |
| Braintree | Brooks Newmark | Conservative | Alan Hurst | Labour |
| Brecon and Radnorshire | Roger Williams | Liberal Democrat | Roger Williams | Liberal Democrat |
| Brent East | Sarah Teather | Liberal Democrat | Sarah Teather | Liberal Democrat |
| Brent North | Barry Gardiner | Labour | Barry Gardiner | Labour |
| Brent South | Dawn Butler | Labour | Paul Boateng | Labour |
| Brentford and Isleworth | Ann Keen | Labour | Ann Keen | Labour |
| Brentwood and Ongar | Eric Pickles | Conservative | Eric Pickles | Conservative |
| Bridgend | Madeleine Moon | Labour | Win Griffiths | Labour |
| Bridgwater | Ian Liddell-Grainger | Conservative | Ian Liddell-Grainger | Conservative |
| Brigg and Goole | Ian Cawsey | Labour | Ian Cawsey | Labour |
| Brighton Kemptown | Des Turner | Labour | Des Turner | Labour |
| Brighton Pavilion | David Lepper | Labour/Co-operative | David Lepper | Labour/Co-operative |
| Bristol East | Kerry McCarthy | Labour | Jean Corston | Labour |
| Bristol North West | Douglas Naysmith | Labour/Co-operative | Douglas Naysmith | Labour/Co-operative |
| Bristol South | Dawn Primarolo | Labour | Dawn Primarolo | Labour |
| Bristol West | Stephen Williams | Liberal Democrat | Valerie Davey | Labour |
| Bromley and Chislehurst ^{b} | Eric Forth | Conservative | Eric Forth | Conservative |
| Bromsgrove | Julie Kirkbride | Conservative | Julie Kirkbride | Conservative |
| Broxbourne | Charles Walker | Conservative | Marion Roe | Conservative |
| Broxtowe | Nick Palmer | Labour | Nick Palmer | Labour |
| Buckingham | John Bercow | Conservative | John Bercow | Conservative |
| Burnley | Kitty Ussher | Labour | Peter Pike | Labour |
| Burton | Janet Dean | Labour | Janet Dean | Labour |
| Bury North | David Chaytor | Labour^{a} | David Chaytor | Labour |
| Bury South | Ivan Lewis | Labour | Ivan Lewis | Labour |
| Bury St Edmunds | David Ruffley | Conservative | David Ruffley | Conservative |
=== C ===
| Constituency | Elected MP | Elected party | Previous MP | Previous party |
| Caernarfon | Hywel Williams | Plaid Cymru | Hywel Williams | Plaid Cymru |
| Caerphilly | Wayne David | Labour | Wayne David | Labour |
| Caithness, Sutherland and Easter Ross | John Thurso | Liberal Democrat | (boundary changes) | Liberal Democrat |
| Calder Valley | Christine McCafferty | Labour | Christine McCafferty | Labour |
| Camberwell and Peckham | Harriet Harman | Labour | Harriet Harman | Labour |
| Cambridge | David Howarth | Liberal Democrat | Anne Campbell | Labour |
| Cannock Chase | Tony Wright | Labour | Tony Wright | Labour |
| Canterbury | Julian Brazier | Conservative | Julian Brazier | Conservative |
| Cardiff Central | Jenny Willott | Liberal Democrat | Jon Owen Jones | Labour/Co-operative |
| Cardiff North | Julie Morgan | Labour | Julie Morgan | Labour |
| Cardiff South and Penarth | Alun Michael | Labour/Co-operative | Alun Michael | Labour/Co-operative |
| Cardiff West | Kevin Brennan | Labour | Kevin Brennan | Labour |
| Carlisle | Eric Martlew | Labour | Eric Martlew | Labour |
| Carmarthen East and Dinefwr | Adam Price | Plaid Cymru | Adam Price | Plaid Cymru |
| Carmarthen West and South Pembrokeshire | Nick Ainger | Labour | Nick Ainger | Labour |
| Carshalton and Wallington | Tom Brake | Liberal Democrat | Tom Brake | Liberal Democrat |
| Castle Point | Bob Spink | Conservative ^{a} | Bob Spink | Conservative |
| Central Ayrshire | Brian Donohoe | Labour | (boundary changes) | Labour |
| Central Suffolk and North Ipswich | Sir Michael Lord | Conservative | Sir Michael Lord | Deputy Speaker (Elected as Conservative) |
| Ceredigion | Mark Williams | Liberal Democrat | Simon Thomas | Plaid Cymru |
| Charnwood | Stephen Dorrell | Conservative | Stephen Dorrell | Conservative |
| Chatham and Aylesford | Jonathan Shaw | Labour | Jonathan Shaw | Labour |
| Cheadle ^{b} | Patsy Calton | Liberal Democrat | Patsy Calton | Liberal Democrat |
| Chelmsford West | Simon Burns | Conservative | Simon Burns | Conservative |
| Cheltenham | Martin Horwood | Liberal Democrat | Nigel Jones | Liberal Democrat |
| Chesham and Amersham | Cheryl Gillan | Conservative | Cheryl Gillan | Conservative |
| Chester, City of | Christine Russell | Labour | Christine Russell | Labour |
| Chesterfield | Paul Holmes | Liberal Democrat | Paul Holmes | Liberal Democrat |
| Chichester | Andrew Tyrie | Conservative | Andrew Tyrie | Conservative |
| Chingford and Woodford Green | Iain Duncan Smith | Conservative | Iain Duncan Smith | Conservative |
| Chipping Barnet | Theresa Villiers | Conservative | Sir Sydney Chapman | Conservative |
| Chorley | Lindsay Hoyle | Labour | Lindsay Hoyle | Labour |
| Christchurch | Christopher Chope | Conservative | Christopher Chope | Conservative |
| Cleethorpes | Shona McIsaac | Labour | Shona McIsaac | Labour |
| Clwyd South | Martyn Jones | Labour | Martyn Jones | Labour |
| Clwyd West | David Jones | Conservative | Gareth Thomas | Labour |
| Coatbridge, Chryston and Bellshill | Tom Clarke | Labour | (boundary changes) | Labour |
| Colchester | Bob Russell | Liberal Democrat | Bob Russell | Liberal Democrat |
| Colne Valley | Kali Mountford | Labour | Kali Mountford | Labour |
| Congleton | Ann Winterton | Conservative | Ann Winterton | Conservative |
| Conwy | Betty Williams | Labour | Betty Williams | Labour |
| Copeland | Jamie Reed | Labour | Jack Cunningham | Labour |
| Corby | Phil Hope | Labour/Co-operative | Phil Hope | Labour/Co-operative |
| Cotswold | Geoffrey Clifton-Brown | Conservative | Geoffrey Clifton-Brown | Conservative |
| Coventry North East | Bob Ainsworth | Labour | Bob Ainsworth | Labour |
| Coventry North West | Geoffrey Robinson | Labour | Geoffrey Robinson | Labour |
| Coventry South | Jim Cunningham | Labour | Jim Cunningham | Labour |
| Crawley | Laura Moffatt | Labour | Laura Moffatt | Labour |
| Crewe and Nantwich ^{b} | Gwyneth Dunwoody | Labour | Gwyneth Dunwoody | Labour |
| Crosby | Claire Curtis-Thomas | Labour | Claire Curtis-Thomas | Labour |
| Croydon Central | Andrew Pelling | Conservative ^{a} | Geraint Davies | Labour |
| Croydon North | Malcolm Wicks | Labour | Malcolm Wicks | Labour |
| Croydon South | Richard Ottaway | Conservative | Richard Ottaway | Conservative |
| Cumbernauld, Kilsyth and Kirkintilloch East | Rosemary McKenna | Labour | (boundary changes) | Labour |
| Cynon Valley | Ann Clwyd | Labour | Ann Clwyd | Labour |
=== D ===
| Constituency | Elected MP | Elected party | Previous MP | Previous party |
| Dagenham | Jon Cruddas | Labour | Jon Cruddas | Labour |
| Darlington | Alan Milburn | Labour | Alan Milburn | Labour |
| Dartford | Howard Stoate | Labour | Howard Stoate | Labour |
| Daventry | Tim Boswell | Conservative | Tim Boswell | Conservative |
| Delyn | David Hanson | Labour | David Hanson | Labour |
| Denton and Reddish | Andrew Gwynne | Labour | Andrew Bennett | Labour |
| Derby North | Bob Laxton | Labour | Bob Laxton | Labour |
| Derby South | Margaret Beckett | Labour | Margaret Beckett | Labour |
| Devizes | Michael Ancram | Conservative | Michael Ancram | Conservative |
| Dewsbury | Shahid Malik | Labour | Ann Taylor | Labour |
| Don Valley | Caroline Flint | Labour | Caroline Flint | Labour |
| Doncaster Central | Rosie Winterton | Labour | Rosie Winterton | Labour |
| Doncaster North | Ed Miliband | Labour | Kevin Hughes | Labour |
| Dover | Gwyn Prosser | Labour | Gwyn Prosser | Labour |
| Dudley North | Ian Austin | Labour | Ross Cranston | Labour |
| Dudley South | Ian Pearson | Labour | Ian Pearson | Labour |
| Dulwich and West Norwood | Tessa Jowell | Labour | Tessa Jowell | Labour |
| Dumfries and Galloway | Russell Brown | Labour | (boundary changes) | Labour |
| Dumfriesshire, Clydesdale and Tweeddale | David Mundell | Conservative | (boundary changes) | Labour |
| Dundee East | Stewart Hosie | Scottish National Party | (boundary changes) | Labour |
| Dundee West | Jim McGovern | Labour | (boundary changes) | Labour |
| Dunfermline and West Fife ^{b} | Rachel Squire | Labour | (boundary changes) | Labour |
| Durham, City of | Roberta Blackman-Woods | Labour | Gerry Steinberg | Labour |
=== E ===
| Constituency | Elected MP | Elected party | Previous MP | Previous party |
| Ealing North | Stephen Pound | Labour | Stephen Pound | Labour |
| Ealing, Acton and Shepherd's Bush | Andy Slaughter | Labour | Clive Soley | Labour |
| Ealing Southall ^{b} | Piara Khabra | Labour | Piara Khabra | Labour |
| Easington | John Cummings | Labour | John Cummings | Labour |
| East Antrim | Sammy Wilson | Democratic Unionist | Roy Beggs | Ulster Unionist |
| East Devon | Hugo Swire | Conservative | Hugo Swire | Conservative |
| East Dunbartonshire | Jo Swinson | Liberal Democrat | (boundary changes) | Labour |
| East Ham | Stephen Timms | Labour | Stephen Timms | Labour |
| East Hampshire | Michael Mates | Conservative | Michael Mates | Conservative |
| East Kilbride, Strathaven and Lesmahagow | Adam Ingram | Labour | (boundary changes) | Labour |
| East Londonderry | Gregory Campbell | Democratic Unionist | Gregory Campbell | Democratic Unionist |
| East Lothian | Anne Picking | Labour | (boundary changes) | Labour |
| East Renfrewshire | Jim Murphy | Labour | Jim Murphy (Eastwood) | Labour |
| East Surrey | Peter Ainsworth | Conservative | Peter Ainsworth | Conservative |
| East Worthing and Shoreham | Tim Loughton | Conservative | Tim Loughton | Conservative |
| East Yorkshire | Greg Knight | Conservative | Greg Knight | Conservative |
| Eastbourne | Nigel Waterson | Conservative | Nigel Waterson | Conservative |
| Eastleigh | Chris Huhne | Liberal Democrat | David Chidgey | Liberal Democrat |
| Eccles | Ian Stewart | Labour | Ian Stewart | Labour |
| Eddisbury | Stephen O'Brien | Conservative | Stephen O'Brien | Conservative |
| Edinburgh East | Gavin Strang | Labour | (boundary changes) | Labour |
| Edinburgh North and Leith | Mark Lazarowicz | Labour/Co-operative | (boundary changes) | Labour |
| Edinburgh South | Nigel Griffiths | Labour | (boundary changes) | Labour |
| Edinburgh South West | Alistair Darling | Labour | (boundary changes) | Labour |
| Edinburgh West | John Barrett | Liberal Democrat | (boundary changes) | Liberal Democrat |
| Edmonton | Andy Love | Labour/Co-operative | Andrew Love | Labour/Co-operative |
| Ellesmere Port and Neston | Andrew Miller | Labour | Andrew Miller | Labour |
| Elmet | Colin Burgon | Labour | Colin Burgon | Labour |
| Eltham | Clive Efford | Labour | Clive Efford | Labour |
| Enfield North | Joan Ryan | Labour | Joan Ryan | Labour |
| Enfield Southgate | David Burrowes | Conservative | Stephen Twigg | Labour |
| Epping Forest | Eleanor Laing | Conservative | Eleanor Laing | Conservative |
| Epsom and Ewell | Chris Grayling | Conservative | Chris Grayling | Conservative |
| Erewash | Liz Blackman | Labour | Liz Blackman | Labour |
| Erith and Thamesmead | John Austin | Labour | John Austin | Labour |
| Esher and Walton | Ian Taylor | Conservative | Ian Taylor | Conservative |
| Exeter | Ben Bradshaw | Labour | Ben Bradshaw | Labour |
=== F ===
| Constituency | Elected MP | Elected party | Previous MP | Previous party |
| Falkirk | Eric Joyce | Labour | (boundary changes) | Labour |
| Falmouth and Camborne | Julia Goldsworthy | Liberal Democrat | Candy Atherton | Labour |
| Fareham | Mark Hoban | Conservative | Mark Hoban | Conservative |
| Faversham and Mid Kent | Hugh Robertson | Conservative | Hugh Robertson | Conservative |
| Feltham and Heston | Alan Keen | Labour/Co-operative | Alan Keen | Labour/Co-operative |
| Fermanagh and South Tyrone | Michelle Gildernew | Sinn Féin | Michelle Gildernew | Sinn Féin |
| Fife North East | Sir Menzies Campbell | Liberal Democrat | (boundary changes) | Liberal Democrat |
| Finchley and Golders Green | Dr Rudi Vis | Labour | Dr Rudi Vis | Labour |
| Folkestone and Hythe | Michael Howard | Conservative | Michael Howard | Conservative |
| Forest of Dean | Mark Harper | Conservative | Diana Organ | Labour |
| Foyle | Mark Durkan | Social Democratic and Labour | John Hume | Social Democratic and Labour |
| Fylde | Michael Jack | Conservative | Michael Jack | Conservative |
=== G ===
| Constituency | Elected MP | Elected party | Previous MP | Previous party |
| Gainsborough | Edward Leigh | Conservative | Edward Leigh | Conservative |
| Gateshead East and Washington West | Sharon Hodgson | Labour | Joyce Quin | Labour |
| Gedling | Vernon Coaker | Labour | Vernon Coaker | Labour |
| Gillingham | Paul Clark | Labour | Paul Clark | Labour |
| Glasgow Central | Mohammad Sarwar | Labour | (boundary changes) | Labour |
| Glasgow East ^{b} | David Marshall | Labour | (boundary changes) | Labour |
| Glasgow North | Ann McKechin | Labour | (boundary changes) | Labour |
| Glasgow North East | Michael Martin | None - Speaker | (boundary changes) | Labour |
| Glasgow North West | John Robertson | Labour | (boundary changes) | Labour |
| Glasgow South | Tom Harris | Labour | (boundary changes) | Labour |
| Glasgow South West | Ian Davidson | Labour/Co-operative | (boundary changes) | Labour |
| Glenrothes ^{b} | John MacDougall | Labour | (boundary changes) | Labour |
| Gloucester | Parmjit Dhanda | Labour | Parmjit Dhanda | Labour |
| Gordon | Malcolm Bruce | Liberal Democrat | (boundary changes) | Liberal Democrat |
| Gosport | Peter Viggers | Conservative | Peter Viggers | Conservative |
| Gower | Martin Caton | Labour | Martin Caton | Labour |
| Grantham and Stamford | Quentin Davies | Conservative ^{a} | Quentin Davies | Conservative |
| Gravesham | Adam Holloway | Conservative | Chris Pond | Labour |
| Great Grimsby | Austin Mitchell | Labour | Austin Mitchell | Labour |
| Great Yarmouth | Tony Wright | Labour | Tony Wright | Labour |
| Greenwich and Woolwich | Nick Raynsford | Labour | Nick Raynsford | Labour |
| Guildford | Anne Milton | Conservative | Sue Doughty | Liberal Democrat |
=== H ===
| Constituency | Elected MP | Elected party | Previous MP | Previous party |
| Hackney North and Stoke Newington | Diane Abbott | Labour | Diane Abbott | Labour |
| Hackney South and Shoreditch | Meg Hillier | Labour/Co-operative | Brian Sedgemore | Labour |
| Halesowen and Rowley Regis | Sylvia Heal | Labour | Sylvia Heal | Deputy Speaker (Elected as Labour) |
| Halifax | Linda Riordan | Labour/Co-operative | Alice Mahon | Labour |
| Haltemprice and Howden ^{b} | David Davis | Conservative | David Davis | Conservative |
| Halton | Derek Twigg | Labour | Derek Twigg | Labour |
| Hammersmith and Fulham | Greg Hands | Conservative | Iain Coleman | Labour |
| Hampstead and Highgate | Glenda Jackson | Labour | Glenda Jackson | Labour |
| Harborough | Edward Garnier | Conservative | Edward Garnier | Conservative |
| Harlow | Bill Rammell | Labour | Bill Rammell | Labour |
| Harrogate and Knaresborough | Phil Willis | Liberal Democrat | Phil Willis | Liberal Democrat |
| Harrow East | Tony McNulty | Labour | Tony McNulty | Labour |
| Harrow West | Gareth Thomas | Labour/Co-operative | Gareth Thomas | Labour |
| Hartlepool | Iain Wright | Labour | Iain Wright | Labour |
| Harwich | Douglas Carswell | Conservative | Ivan Henderson | Labour |
| Hastings and Rye | Michael Foster | Labour | Michael Foster | Labour |
| Havant | David Willetts | Conservative | David Willetts | Conservative |
| Hayes and Harlington | John McDonnell | Labour | John McDonnell | Labour |
| Hazel Grove | Andrew Stunell | Liberal Democrat | Andrew Stunell | Liberal Democrat |
| Hemel Hempstead | Mike Penning | Conservative | Tony McWalter | Labour/Co-operative |
| Hemsworth | Jon Trickett | Labour | Jon Trickett | Labour |
| Hendon | Andrew Dismore | Labour | Andrew Dismore | Labour |
| Henley ^{b} | Boris Johnson | Conservative | Boris Johnson | Conservative |
| Hereford | Paul Keetch | Liberal Democrat | Paul Keetch | Liberal Democrat |
| Hertford and Stortford | Mark Prisk | Conservative | Mark Prisk | Conservative |
| Hertsmere | James Clappison | Conservative | James Clappison | Conservative |
| Hexham | Peter Atkinson | Conservative | Peter Atkinson | Conservative |
| Heywood and Middleton | Jim Dobbin | Labour/Co-operative | Jim Dobbin | Labour/Co-operative |
| High Peak | Tom Levitt | Labour | Tom Levitt | Labour |
| Hitchin and Harpenden | Peter Lilley | Conservative | Peter Lilley | Conservative |
| Holborn and St Pancras | Frank Dobson | Labour | Frank Dobson | Labour |
| Hornchurch | James Brokenshire | Conservative | John Cryer | Labour |
| Hornsey and Wood Green | Lynne Featherstone | Liberal Democrat | Barbara Roche | Labour |
| Horsham | Francis Maude | Conservative | Francis Maude | Conservative |
| Houghton and Washington East | Fraser Kemp | Labour | Fraser Kemp | Labour |
| Hove | Celia Barlow | Labour | Ivor Caplin | Labour |
| Huddersfield | Barry Sheerman | Labour/Co-operative | Barry Sheerman | Labour/Co-operative |
| Huntingdon | Jonathan Djanogly | Conservative | Jonathan Djanogly | Conservative |
| Hyndburn | Greg Pope | Labour | Greg Pope | Labour |
=== I ===
| Constituency | Elected MP | Elected party | Previous MP | Previous party |
| Ilford North | Lee Scott | Conservative | Linda Perham | Labour |
| Ilford South | Mike Gapes | Labour/Co-operative | Mike Gapes | Labour/Co-operative |
| Inverclyde | David Cairns | Labour | (boundary changes) | Labour |
| Inverness, Nairn, Badenoch and Strathspey | Danny Alexander | Liberal Democrat | (boundary changes) | Labour |
| Ipswich | Chris Mole | Labour | Chris Mole | Labour |
| Isle of Wight | Andrew Turner | Conservative | Andrew Turner | Conservative |
| Islington North | Jeremy Corbyn | Labour | Jeremy Corbyn | Labour |
| Islington South and Finsbury | Emily Thornberry | Labour | Chris Smith | Labour |
| Islwyn | Don Touhig | Labour/Co-operative | Don Touhig | Labour/Co-operative |
=== J ===
| Constituency | Elected MP | Elected party | Previous MP | Previous party |
| Jarrow | Stephen Hepburn | Labour | Stephen Hepburn | Labour |
=== K ===
| Constituency | Elected MP | Elected party | Previous MP | Previous party |
| Keighley | Ann Cryer | Labour | Ann Cryer | Labour |
| Kensington and Chelsea | Malcolm Rifkind | Conservative | Michael Portillo | Conservative |
| Kettering | Philip Hollobone | Conservative | Phil Sawford | Labour |
| Kilmarnock and Loudoun | Des Browne | Labour | (boundary changes) | Labour |
| Kingston and Surbiton | Edward Davey | Liberal Democrat | Edward Davey | Liberal Democrat |
| Kingston upon Hull East | John Prescott | Labour | John Prescott | Labour |
| Kingston upon Hull North | Diana Johnson | Labour | Kevin McNamara | Labour |
| Kingston upon Hull West and Hessle | Alan Johnson | Labour | Alan Johnson | Labour |
| Kingswood | Roger Berry | Labour | Roger Berry | Labour |
| Kirkcaldy and Cowdenbeath | Gordon Brown | Labour | (boundary changes) | Labour |
| Knowsley North and Sefton East | George Howarth | Labour | George Howarth | Labour |
| Knowsley South | Edward O'Hara | Labour | Edward O'Hara | Labour |
=== L ===
| Constituency | Elected MP | Elected party | Previous MP | Previous party |
| Lagan Valley | Jeffrey Donaldson | Democratic Unionist | Jeffrey Donaldson | Democratic Unionist |
| Lanark and Hamilton East | Jimmy Hood | Labour | (boundary changes) | Labour |
| Lancaster and Wyre | Ben Wallace | Conservative | Hilton Dawson | Labour |
| Leeds Central | Hilary Benn | Labour | Hilary Benn | Labour |
| Leeds East | George Mudie | Labour | George Mudie | Labour |
| Leeds North East | Fabian Hamilton | Labour | Fabian Hamilton | Labour |
| Leeds North West | Greg Mulholland | Liberal Democrat | Harold Best | Labour |
| Leeds West | John Battle | Labour | John Battle | Labour |
| Leicester East | Keith Vaz | Labour | Keith Vaz | Labour |
| Leicester South | Sir Peter Soulsby | Labour | Parmjit Singh Gill | Liberal Democrat |
| Leicester West | Patricia Hewitt | Labour | Patricia Hewitt | Labour |
| Leigh | Andy Burnham | Labour | Andy Burnham | Labour |
| Leominster | Bill Wiggin | Conservative | Bill Wiggin | Conservative |
| Lewes | Norman Baker | Liberal Democrat | Norman Baker | Liberal Democrat |
| Lewisham East | Bridget Prentice | Labour | Bridget Prentice | Labour |
| Lewisham West | Jim Dowd | Labour | Jim Dowd | Labour |
| Lewisham Deptford | Joan Ruddock | Labour | Joan Ruddock | Labour |
| Leyton and Wanstead | Harry Cohen | Labour | Harry Cohen | Labour |
| Lichfield | Michael Fabricant | Conservative | Michael Fabricant | Conservative |
| Lincoln | Gillian Merron | Labour | Gillian Merron | Labour |
| Linlithgow and East Falkirk | Michael Connarty | Labour | (boundary changes) | Labour |
| Liverpool Garston | Maria Eagle | Labour | Maria Eagle | Labour |
| Liverpool Riverside | Louise Ellman | Labour/Co-operative | Louise Ellman | Labour/Co-operative |
| Liverpool Walton | Peter Kilfoyle | Labour | Peter Kilfoyle | Labour |
| Liverpool Wavertree | Jane Kennedy | Labour | Jane Kennedy | Labour |
| Liverpool West Derby | Bob Wareing ^{a} | Labour | Bob Wareing | Labour |
| Livingston ^{b} | Robin Cook | Labour | (boundary changes) | Labour |
| Llanelli | Nia Griffith | Labour | Denzil Davies | Labour |
| London and Westminster, Cities of | Mark Field | Conservative | Mark Field | Conservative |
| Loughborough | Andy Reed | Labour/Co-operative | Andy Reed | Labour/Co-operative |
| Louth and Horncastle | Sir Peter Tapsell | Conservative | Sir Peter Tapsell | Conservative |
| Ludlow | Philip Dunne | Conservative | Matthew Green | Liberal Democrat |
| Luton North | Kelvin Hopkins | Labour | Kelvin Hopkins | Labour |
| Luton South | Margaret Moran | Labour | Margaret Moran | Labour |
=== M ===
| Constituency | Elected MP | Elected party | Previous MP | Previous party |
| Macclesfield | Sir Nicholas Winterton | Conservative | Sir Nicholas Winterton | Conservative |
| Maidenhead | Theresa May | Conservative | Theresa May | Conservative |
| Maidstone and The Weald | Ann Widdecombe | Conservative | Ann Widdecombe | Conservative |
| Makerfield | Ian McCartney | Labour | Ian McCartney | Labour |
| Maldon and East Chelmsford | John Whittingdale | Conservative | John Whittingdale | Conservative |
| Manchester Blackley | Graham Stringer | Labour | Graham Stringer | Labour |
| Manchester Central | Tony Lloyd | Labour | Tony Lloyd | Labour |
| Manchester Gorton | Gerald Kaufman | Labour | Gerald Kaufman | Labour |
| Manchester Withington | John Leech | Liberal Democrat | Keith Bradley | Labour |
| Mansfield | Alan Meale | Labour | Alan Meale | Labour |
| Medway | Robert Marshall-Andrews | Labour | Robert Marshall-Andrews | Labour |
| Meirionnydd Nant Conwy | Elfyn Llwyd | Plaid Cymru | Elfyn Llwyd | Plaid Cymru |
| Meriden | Caroline Spelman | Conservative | Caroline Spelman | Conservative |
| Merthyr Tydfil and Rhymney | Dai Havard | Labour | Dai Havard | Labour |
| Mid Bedfordshire | Nadine Dorries | Conservative | Jonathan Sayeed | Conservative |
| Mid Dorset and North Poole | Annette Brooke | Liberal Democrat | Annette Brooke | Liberal Democrat |
| Mid Norfolk | Keith Simpson | Conservative | Keith Simpson | Conservative |
| Mid Sussex | Nicholas Soames | Conservative | Nicholas Soames | Conservative |
| Mid Ulster | Martin McGuinness | Sinn Féin | Martin McGuinness | Sinn Féin |
| Mid Worcestershire | Peter Luff | Conservative | Peter Luff | Conservative |
| Middlesbrough | Sir Stuart Bell | Labour | Sir Stuart Bell | Labour |
| Middlesbrough South and East Cleveland | Dr Ashok Kumar | Labour | Dr Ashok Kumar | Labour |
| Midlothian | David Hamilton | Labour | (boundary changes) | Labour |
| Milton Keynes South West | Dr Phyllis Starkey | Labour | Dr Phyllis Starkey | Labour |
| Mitcham and Morden | Siobhain McDonagh | Labour | Siobhain McDonagh | Labour |
| Mole Valley | Sir Paul Beresford | Conservative | Sir Paul Beresford | Conservative |
| Monmouth | David Davies | Conservative | Huw Edwards | Labour |
| Montgomeryshire | Lembit Öpik | Liberal Democrat | Lembit Öpik | Liberal Democrat |
| Moray | Angus Robertson | Scottish National Party | (boundary changes) | Scottish National Party |
| Morecambe and Lunesdale | Geraldine Smith | Labour | Geraldine Smith | Labour |
| Morley and Rothwell | Colin Challen | Labour | Colin Challen | Labour |
| Motherwell and Wishaw | Frank Roy | Labour | (boundary changes) | Labour |
=== N ===
| Constituency | Elected MP | Elected party | Previous MP | Previous party |
| Na h-Eileanan an Iar (Western Isles) | Angus MacNeil | Scottish National Party | Calum Macdonald | Labour |
| Neath | Peter Hain | Labour | Peter Hain | Labour |
| New Forest East | Dr Julian Lewis | Conservative | Dr Julian Lewis | Conservative |
| New Forest West | Desmond Swayne | Conservative | Desmond Swayne | Conservative |
| Newark | Patrick Mercer | Conservative | Patrick Mercer | Conservative |
| Newbury | Richard Benyon | Conservative | David Rendel | Liberal Democrat |
| Newcastle upon Tyne Central | Jim Cousins | Labour | Jim Cousins | Labour |
| Newcastle upon Tyne East and Wallsend | Nick Brown | Labour | Nick Brown | Labour |
| Newcastle upon Tyne North | Doug Henderson | Labour | Doug Henderson | Labour |
| Newcastle-under-Lyme | Paul Farrelly | Labour | Paul Farrelly | Labour |
| Newport East | Jessica Morden | Labour | Alan Howarth | Labour |
| Newport West | Paul Flynn | Labour | Paul Flynn | Labour |
| Newry and Armagh | Conor Murphy | Sinn Féin | Seamus Mallon | Social Democratic and Labour |
| Normanton | Ed Balls | Labour/Co-operative | Bill O'Brien | Labour |
| North Antrim | The Rev. Ian Paisley | Democratic Unionist | The Rev. Ian Paisley | Democratic Unionist |
| North Ayrshire and Arran | Katy Clark | Labour | (boundary changes) | Labour |
| North Cornwall | Dan Rogerson | Liberal Democrat | Paul Tyler | Liberal Democrat |
| North Devon | Nick Harvey | Liberal Democrat | Nick Harvey | Liberal Democrat |
| North Dorset | Robert Walter | Conservative | Robert Walter | Conservative |
| North Down | Lady Sylvia Hermon | Ulster Unionist | Lady Sylvia Hermon | Ulster Unionist |
| North Durham | Kevan Jones | Labour | Kevan Jones | Labour |
| North East Bedfordshire | Alistair Burt | Conservative | Alistair Burt | Conservative |
| North East Cambridgeshire | Malcolm Moss | Conservative | Malcolm Moss | Conservative |
| North East Derbyshire | Natascha Engel | Labour | Harry Barnes | Labour |
| North East Hampshire | James Arbuthnot | Conservative | James Arbuthnot | Conservative |
| North East Hertfordshire | Oliver Heald | Conservative | Oliver Heald | Conservative |
| North East Milton Keynes | Mark Lancaster | Conservative | Brian White | Labour |
| North Essex | Bernard Jenkin | Conservative | Bernard Jenkin | Conservative |
| North Norfolk | Norman Lamb | Liberal Democrat | Norman Lamb | Liberal Democrat |
| North Shropshire | Owen Paterson | Conservative | Owen Paterson | Conservative |
| North Thanet | Roger Gale | Conservative | Roger Gale | Conservative |
| North Tyneside | Stephen Byers | Labour | Stephen Byers | Labour |
| North Warwickshire | Mike O'Brien | Labour | Mike O'Brien | Labour |
| North West Cambridgeshire | Shailesh Vara | Conservative | Sir Brian Mawhinney | Conservative |
| North West Durham | Hilary Armstrong | Labour | Hilary Armstrong | Labour |
| North West Hampshire | Sir George Young | Conservative | Sir George Young | Conservative |
| North West Leicestershire | David Taylor | Labour/Co-operative | David Taylor | Labour/Co-operative |
| North West Norfolk | Henry Bellingham | Conservative | Henry Bellingham | Conservative |
| North Wiltshire | James Gray | Conservative | James Gray | Conservative |
| Northampton North | Sally Keeble | Labour | Sally Keeble | Labour |
| Northampton South | Brian Binley | Conservative | Tony Clarke | Labour |
| Northavon | Steve Webb | Liberal Democrat | Steve Webb | Liberal Democrat |
| Norwich North | Dr Ian Gibson | Labour | Dr Ian Gibson | Labour |
| Norwich South | Charles Clarke | Labour | Charles Clarke | Labour |
| Nottingham East | John Heppell | Labour | John Heppell | Labour |
| Nottingham North | Graham Allen | Labour | Graham Allen | Labour |
| Nottingham South | Alan Simpson | Labour | Alan Simpson | Labour |
| Nuneaton | Bill Olner | Labour | Bill Olner | Labour |
=== O ===
| Constituency | Elected MP | Elected party | Previous MP | Previous party |
| Ochil and South Perthshire | Gordon Banks | Labour | (boundary changes) | Labour |
| Ogmore | Huw Irranca-Davies | Labour | Huw Irranca-Davies | Labour |
| Old Bexley and Sidcup | Derek Conway | Conservative ^{a} | Derek Conway | Conservative |
| Oldham East and Saddleworth | Phil Woolas | Labour | Phil Woolas | Labour |
| Oldham West and Royton | Michael Meacher | Labour | Michael Meacher | Labour |
| Orkney and Shetland | Alistair Carmichael | Liberal Democrat | Alistair Carmichael | Liberal Democrat |
| Orpington | John Horam | Conservative | John Horam | Conservative |
| Oxford East | Andrew Smith | Labour | Andrew Smith | Labour |
| Oxford West and Abingdon | Dr Evan Harris | Liberal Democrat | Dr Evan Harris | Liberal Democrat |
=== P ===
| Constituency | Elected MP | Elected party | Previous MP | Previous party |
| Paisley and Renfrewshire North | James Sheridan | Labour | (boundary changes) | Labour |
| Paisley and Renfrewshire South | Douglas Alexander | Labour | (boundary changes) | Labour |
| Pendle | Gordon Prentice | Labour | Gordon Prentice | Labour |
| Penrith and The Border | David Maclean | Conservative | David Maclean | Conservative |
| Perth and North Perthshire | Peter Wishart | Scottish National Party | (boundary changes) | Scottish National Party |
| Peterborough | Stewart Jackson | Conservative | Helen Clark | Labour |
| Plymouth Devonport | Alison Seabeck | Labour | David Jamieson | Labour |
| Plymouth Sutton | Linda Gilroy | Labour/Co-operative | Linda Gilroy | Labour/Co-operative |
| Pontefract and Castleford | Yvette Cooper | Labour | Yvette Cooper | Labour |
| Pontypridd | Dr Kim Howells | Labour | Dr Kim Howells | Labour |
| Poole | Robert Syms | Conservative | Robert Syms | Conservative |
| Poplar and Canning Town | Jim Fitzpatrick | Labour | Jim Fitzpatrick | Labour |
| Portsmouth North | Sarah McCarthy-Fry | Labour/Co-operative | Syd Rapson | Labour |
| Portsmouth South | Mike Hancock | Liberal Democrat | Mike Hancock | Liberal Democrat |
| Preseli Pembrokeshire | Stephen Crabb | Conservative | Jackie Lawrence | Labour |
| Preston | Mark Hendrick | Labour/Co-operative | Mark Hendrick | Labour/Co-operative |
| Pudsey | Paul Truswell | Labour | Paul Truswell | Labour |
| Putney | Justine Greening | Conservative | Tony Colman | Labour |
=== R ===
| Constituency | Elected MP | Elected party | Previous MP | Previous party |
| Rayleigh | Mark Francois | Conservative | Mark Francois | Conservative |
| Reading East | Rob Wilson | Conservative | Jane Griffiths | Labour |
| Reading West | Martin Salter | Labour | Martin Salter | Labour |
| Redcar | Vera Baird | Labour | Vera Baird | Labour |
| Redditch | Jacqui Smith | Labour | Jacqui Smith | Labour |
| Regent's Park and Kensington North | Karen Buck | Labour | Karen Buck | Labour |
| Reigate | Crispin Blunt | Conservative | Crispin Blunt | Conservative |
| Rhondda | Chris Bryant | Labour | Chris Bryant | Labour |
| Ribble Valley | Nigel Evans | Conservative | Nigel Evans | Conservative |
| Richmond, North Yorkshire | William Hague | Conservative | William Hague | Conservative |
| Richmond Park | Susan Kramer | Liberal Democrat | Dr Jenny Tonge | Liberal Democrat |
| Rochdale | Paul Rowen | Liberal Democrat | Lorna Fitzsimons | Labour |
| Rochford and Southend East | James Duddridge | Conservative | Sir Teddy Taylor | Conservative |
| Romford | Andrew Rosindell | Conservative | Andrew Rosindell | Conservative |
| Romsey | Sandra Gidley | Liberal Democrat | Sandra Gidley | Liberal Democrat |
| Ross, Skye and Lochaber | Charles Kennedy | Liberal Democrat | (boundary changes) | Liberal Democrat |
| Rossendale and Darwen | Janet Anderson | Labour | Janet Anderson | Labour |
| Rother Valley | Kevin Barron | Labour | Sir Kevin Barron | Labour |
| Rotherham | Dr Denis MacShane | Labour | Dr Denis MacShane | Labour |
| Rugby and Kenilworth | Jeremy Wright | Conservative | Andy King | Labour |
| Ruislip-Northwood | Nick Hurd | Conservative | John Wilkinson | Conservative |
| Runnymede and Weybridge | Philip Hammond | Conservative | Philip Hammond | Conservative |
| Rushcliffe | Kenneth Clarke | Conservative | Kenneth Clarke | Conservative |
| Rutherglen and Hamilton West | Thomas McAvoy | Labour/Co-operative | (boundary changes) | Labour |
| Rutland and Melton | Alan Duncan | Conservative | Alan Duncan | Conservative |
| Ryedale | John Greenway | Conservative | John Greenway | Conservative |
=== S ===
| Constituency | Elected MP | Elected party | Previous MP | Previous party |
| Saffron Walden | Sir Alan Haselhurst | Conservative | Sir Alan Haselhurst | Deputy Speaker (Elected as Conservative) |
| St Albans | Anne Main | Conservative | Kerry Pollard | Labour |
| St Helens North | David Watts | Labour | David Watts | Labour |
| St Helens South | Shaun Woodward | Labour | Shaun Woodward | Labour |
| St Ives | Andrew George | Liberal Democrat | Andrew George | Liberal Democrat |
| Salford | Hazel Blears | Labour | Hazel Blears | Labour |
| Salisbury | Robert Key | Conservative | Robert Key | Conservative |
| Scarborough and Whitby | Robert Goodwill | Conservative | Lawrie Quinn | Labour |
| Scunthorpe | Elliot Morley | Labour^{a} | Elliot Morley | Labour |
| Sedgefield ^{b} | Tony Blair | Labour | Tony Blair | Labour |
| Selby | John Grogan | Labour | John Grogan | Labour |
| Sevenoaks | Michael Fallon | Conservative | Michael Fallon | Conservative |
| Sheffield Central | Richard Caborn | Labour | Richard Caborn | Labour |
| Sheffield Attercliffe | Clive Betts | Labour | Clive Betts | Labour |
| Sheffield Brightside | David Blunkett | Labour | David Blunkett | Labour |
| Sheffield Hallam | Nick Clegg | Liberal Democrat | Richard Allan | Liberal Democrat |
| Sheffield Heeley | Meg Munn | Labour/Co-operative | Meg Munn | Labour/Co-operative |
| Sheffield Hillsborough | Angela Smith | Labour | Helen Jackson | Labour |
| Sherwood | Paddy Tipping | Labour | Paddy Tipping | Labour |
| Shipley | Philip Davies | Conservative | Chris Leslie | Labour |
| Shrewsbury and Atcham | Daniel Kawczynski | Conservative | Paul Marsden | Independent Labour |
| Sittingbourne and Sheppey | Derek Wyatt | Labour | Derek Wyatt | Labour |
| Skipton and Ripon | David Curry | Conservative | David Curry | Conservative |
| Sleaford and North Hykeham | Douglas Hogg | Conservative | Douglas Hogg | Conservative |
| Slough | Fiona Mactaggart | Labour | Fiona Mactaggart | Labour |
| Solihull | Lorely Burt | Liberal Democrat | John Taylor | Conservative |
| Somerton and Frome | David Heath | Liberal Democrat | David Heath | Liberal Democrat |
| South Antrim | William McCrea | Democratic Unionist | David Burnside | Ulster Unionist |
| South Cambridgeshire | Andrew Lansley | Conservative | Andrew Lansley | Conservative |
| South Derbyshire | Mark Todd | Labour | Mark Todd | Labour |
| South Dorset | Jim Knight | Labour | Jim Knight | Labour |
| South Down | Eddie McGrady | Social Democratic and Labour | Eddie McGrady | Social Democratic and Labour |
| South East Cambridgeshire | James Paice | Conservative | James Paice | Conservative |
| South East Cornwall | Colin Breed | Liberal Democrat | Colin Breed | Liberal Democrat |
| South Holland and The Deepings | John Hayes | Conservative | John Hayes | Conservative |
| South Norfolk | Richard Bacon | Conservative | Richard Bacon | Conservative |
| South Ribble | David Borrow | Labour | David Borrow | Labour |
| South Shields | David Miliband | Labour | David Miliband | Labour |
| South Staffordshire | Sir Patrick Cormack | Conservative | Sir Patrick Cormack | Conservative |
| South Suffolk | Tim Yeo | Conservative | Tim Yeo | Conservative |
| South Thanet | Dr Stephen Ladyman | Labour | Dr Stephen Ladyman | Labour |
| South West Bedfordshire | Andrew Selous | Conservative | Andrew Selous | Conservative |
| South West Devon | Gary Streeter | Conservative | Gary Streeter | Conservative |
| South West Hertfordshire | David Gauke | Conservative | Richard Page | Conservative |
| South West Norfolk | Christopher Fraser | Conservative | Gillian Shephard | Conservative |
| South West Surrey | Jeremy Hunt | Conservative | Virginia Bottomley | Conservative |
| Southampton Itchen | John Denham | Labour | John Denham | Labour |
| Southampton Test | Dr Alan Whitehead | Labour | Dr Alan Whitehead | Labour |
| Southend West | David Amess | Conservative | David Amess | Conservative |
| Southport | Dr John Pugh | Liberal Democrat | Dr John Pugh | Liberal Democrat |
| North Southwark and Bermondsey | Simon Hughes | Liberal Democrat | Simon Hughes | Liberal Democrat |
| Spelthorne | David Wilshire | Conservative | David Wilshire | Conservative |
| Stafford | David Kidney | Labour | David Kidney | Labour |
| Staffordshire Moorlands | Charlotte Atkins | Labour | Charlotte Atkins | Labour |
| Stalybridge and Hyde | James Purnell | Labour | James Purnell | Labour |
| Stevenage | Barbara Follett | Labour | Barbara Follett | Labour |
| Stirling | Anne McGuire | Labour | (boundary changes) | Labour |
| Stockport | Ann Coffey | Labour | Ann Coffey | Labour |
| Stockton North | Frank Cook | Labour | Frank Cook | Labour |
| Stockton South | Dari Taylor | Labour | Dari Taylor | Labour |
| Stoke-on-Trent Central | Mark Fisher | Labour | Mark Fisher | Labour |
| Stoke-on-Trent North | Joan Walley | Labour | Joan Walley | Labour |
| Stoke-on-Trent South | Robert Flello | Labour | George Stevenson | Labour |
| Stone | Bill Cash | Conservative | Bill Cash | Conservative |
| Stourbridge | Lynda Waltho | Labour | Debra Shipley | Labour |
| Strangford | Iris Robinson | Democratic Unionist | Iris Robinson | Democratic Unionist |
| Stratford-on-Avon | John Maples | Conservative | John Maples | Conservative |
| Streatham | Keith Hill | Labour | Keith Hill | Labour |
| Stretford and Urmston | Beverley Hughes | Labour | Beverley Hughes | Labour |
| Stroud | David Drew | Labour/Co-operative | David Drew | Labour/Co-operative |
| Suffolk Coastal | John Gummer | Conservative | John Gummer | Conservative |
| Sunderland North | Bill Etherington | Labour | Bill Etherington | Labour |
| Sunderland South | Chris Mullin | Labour | Chris Mullin | Labour |
| Surrey Heath | Michael Gove | Conservative | Nick Hawkins | Conservative |
| Sutton and Cheam | Paul Burstow | Liberal Democrat | Paul Burstow | Liberal Democrat |
| Sutton Coldfield | Andrew Mitchell | Conservative | Andrew Mitchell | Conservative |
| Swansea East | Sian James | Labour | Donald Anderson | Labour |
| Swansea West | Alan Williams | Labour | Alan Williams | Labour |
| Swindon North | Michael Wills | Labour | Michael Wills | Labour |
| Swindon South | Anne Snelgrove | Labour | Julia Drown | Labour |
=== T ===
| Constituency | Elected MP | Elected party | Previous MP | Previous party |
| Tamworth | Brian Jenkins | Labour | Brian Jenkins | Labour |
| Tatton | George Osborne | Conservative | George Osborne | Conservative |
| Taunton | Jeremy Browne | Liberal Democrat | Adrian Flook | Conservative |
| Teignbridge | Richard Younger-Ross | Liberal Democrat | Richard Younger-Ross | Liberal Democrat |
| Telford | David Wright | Labour | David Wright | Labour |
| Tewkesbury | Laurence Robertson | Conservative | Laurence Robertson | Conservative |
| Thurrock | Andrew Mackinlay | Labour | Andrew Mackinlay | Labour |
| Tiverton and Honiton | Angela Browning | Conservative | Angela Browning | Conservative |
| Tonbridge and Malling | Sir John Stanley | Conservative | Sir John Stanley | Conservative |
| Tooting | Sadiq Khan | Labour | Tom Cox | Labour |
| Torbay | Adrian Sanders | Liberal Democrat | Adrian Sanders | Liberal Democrat |
| Torfaen | Paul Murphy | Labour | Paul Murphy | Labour |
| Torridge and West Devon | Geoffrey Cox | Conservative | John Burnett | Liberal Democrat |
| Totnes | Anthony Steen | Conservative | Anthony Steen | Conservative |
| Tottenham | David Lammy | Labour | David Lammy | Labour |
| Truro and St Austell | Matthew Taylor | Liberal Democrat | Matthew Taylor | Liberal Democrat |
| Tunbridge Wells | Greg Clark | Conservative | Archie Norman | Conservative |
| Twickenham | Dr Vincent Cable | Liberal Democrat | Dr Vincent Cable | Liberal Democrat |
| Tyne Bridge | David Clelland | Labour | David Clelland | Labour |
| Tynemouth | Alan Campbell | Labour | Alan Campbell | Labour |
=== U ===
| Constituency | Elected MP | Elected party | Previous MP | Previous party |
| Upminster | Angela Watkinson | Conservative | Angela Watkinson | Conservative |
| Upper Bann | David Simpson | Democratic Unionist | David Trimble | Ulster Unionist |
| Uxbridge | John Randall | Conservative | John Randall | Conservative |
=== V ===
| Constituency | Elected MP | Elected party | Previous MP | Previous party |
| Vale of Clwyd | Chris Ruane | Labour | Chris Ruane | Labour |
| Vale of Glamorgan | John Smith | Labour | John Smith | Labour |
| Vale of York | Anne McIntosh | Conservative | Anne McIntosh | Conservative |
| Vauxhall | Kate Hoey | Labour | Kate Hoey | Labour |
=== W ===
| Constituency | Elected MP | Elected party | Previous MP | Previous party |
| Wakefield | Mary Creagh | Labour | David Hinchliffe | Labour |
| Wallasey | Angela Eagle | Labour | Angela Eagle | Labour |
| Walsall North | David Winnick | Labour | David Winnick | Labour |
| Walsall South | Bruce George | Labour | Bruce George | Labour |
| Walthamstow | Neil Gerrard | Labour | Neil Gerrard | Labour |
| Wansbeck | Denis Murphy | Labour | Denis Murphy | Labour |
| Wansdyke | Dan Norris | Labour | Dan Norris | Labour |
| Wantage | Ed Vaizey | Conservative | Robert Jackson | Labour |
| Warley | John Spellar | Labour | John Spellar | Labour |
| Warrington North | Helen Jones | Labour | Helen Jones | Labour |
| Warrington South | Helen Southworth | Labour | Helen Southworth | Labour |
| Warwick and Leamington | James Plaskitt | Labour | James Plaskitt | Labour |
| Watford | Claire Ward | Labour | Claire Ward | Labour |
| Waveney | Bob Blizzard | Labour | Bob Blizzard | Labour |
| Wealden | Charles Hendry | Conservative | Charles Hendry | Conservative |
| Weaver Vale | Mike Hall | Labour | Mike Hall | Labour |
| Wellingborough | Peter Bone | Conservative | Paul Stinchcombe | Labour |
| Wells | David Heathcoat-Amory | Conservative | David Heathcoat-Amory | Conservative |
| Welwyn Hatfield | Grant Shapps | Conservative | Melanie Johnson | Labour |
| Wentworth | John Healey | Labour | John Healey | Labour |
| West Aberdeenshire and Kincardine | Sir Robert Smith, Bt | Liberal Democrat | (boundary changes) | Liberal Democrat |
| West Bromwich East | Tom Watson | Labour | Tom Watson | Labour |
| West Bromwich West | Adrian Bailey | Labour/Co-operative | Adrian Bailey | Labour/Co-operative |
| West Derbyshire | Patrick McLoughlin | Conservative | Patrick McLoughlin | Conservative |
| West Dorset | Oliver Letwin | Conservative | Oliver Letwin | Conservative |
| West Dunbartonshire | John McFall | Labour/Co-operative | (boundary changes) | Labour |
| West Ham | Lyn Brown | Labour | Tony Banks | Labour |
| West Lancashire | Rosie Cooper | Labour | Colin Pickthall | Labour |
| West Suffolk | Richard Spring | Conservative | Richard Spring | Conservative |
| West Tyrone | Pat Doherty | Sinn Féin | Pat Doherty | Sinn Féin |
| West Worcestershire | Sir Michael Spicer | Conservative | Sir Michael Spicer | Conservative |
| Westbury | Dr Andrew Murrison | Conservative | Dr Andrew Murrison | Conservative |
| Westmorland and Lonsdale | Tim Farron | Liberal Democrat | Tim Collins | Conservative |
| Weston-Super-Mare | John Penrose | Conservative | Brian Cotter | Liberal Democrat |
| Wigan | Neil Turner | Labour | Neil Turner | Labour |
| Wimbledon | Stephen Hammond | Conservative | Roger Casale | Labour |
| Winchester | Mark Oaten | Liberal Democrat | Mark Oaten | Liberal Democrat |
| Windsor | Adam Afriyie | Conservative | Michael Trend | Conservative |
| Wirral South | Ben Chapman | Labour | Ben Chapman | Labour |
| Wirral West | Stephen Hesford | Labour | Stephen Hesford | Labour |
| Witney | David Cameron | Conservative | David Cameron | Conservative |
| Woking | Humfrey Malins | Conservative | Humfrey Malins | Conservative |
| Wokingham | John Redwood | Conservative | John Redwood | Conservative |
| Wolverhampton North East | Ken Purchase | Labour/Co-operative | Ken Purchase | Labour/Co-operative |
| Wolverhampton South East | Pat McFadden | Labour | Dennis Turner | Labour/Co-operative |
| Wolverhampton South West | Rob Marris | Labour | Rob Marris | Labour |
| Woodspring | Dr Liam Fox | Conservative | Dr Liam Fox | Conservative |
| Worcester | Michael Foster | Labour | Michael Foster | Labour |
| Workington | Tony Cunningham | Labour | Tony Cunningham | Labour |
| Worsley | Barbara Keeley | Labour | Terence Lewis | Labour |
| Worthing West | Peter Bottomley | Conservative | Peter Bottomley | Conservative |
| Wrekin, The | Mark Pritchard | Conservative | Peter Bradley | Labour |
| Wrexham | Ian Lucas | Labour | Ian Lucas | Labour |
| Wycombe | Paul Goodman | Conservative | Paul Goodman | Conservative |
| Wyre Forest | Dr Richard Taylor | Health Concern | Dr Richard Taylor | Health Concern |
| Wythenshawe and Sale East | Paul Goggins | Labour | Paul Goggins | Labour |
=== Y ===
| Constituency | Elected MP | Elected party | Previous MP | Previous party |
| Yeovil | David Laws | Liberal Democrat | David Laws | Liberal Democrat |
| Ynys Môn (Isle of Anglesey) | Albert Owen | Labour | Albert Owen | Labour |
| York, City of | Hugh Bayley | Labour | Hugh Bayley | Labour |

== Postponed poll ==
- South Staffordshire - due to the death of a candidate standing both for parliament and a seat on the local council after some of the postal votes had been received, the elections in this constituency were postponed until 23 June 2005. Sir Patrick Cormack (Conservative), the incumbent Member of Parliament, retained his seat with an increased majority.

== By-elections ==
| Constituency | Date | Incumbent | Party | Cause | Date of Vacancy | Winner | Party |
|---|---|---|---|---|---|---|---|
| Cheadle | 14 July 2005 | Patsy Calton | Liberal Democrats | Death of incumbent | 29 May 2005 | Mark Hunter | Liberal Democrats |
| Livingston | 29 September 2005 | Robin Cook | Labour | Death of incumbent | 6 August 2005 | Jim Devine | Labour |
| Dunfermline and West Fife | 9 February 2006 | Rachel Squire | Labour | Death of incumbent | 5 January 2006 | Willie Rennie | Liberal Democrats |
| Blaenau Gwent | 29 June 2006 | Peter Law | Independent | Death of incumbent | 25 April 2006 | Dai Davies | Independent |
| Bromley and Chislehurst | 29 June 2006 | Eric Forth | Conservative | Death of incumbent | 17 May 2006 | Bob Neil | Conservative |
| Ealing Southall | 19 July 2007 | Piara Khabra | Labour | Death of incumbent | 19 June 2007 | Virendra Sharma | Labour |
| Sedgefield | 19 July 2007 | Tony Blair | Labour | Resignation to become Middle East Envoy | 27 June 2007 | Phil Wilson | Labour |
| Crewe and Nantwich | 22 May 2008 | Gwyneth Dunwoody | Labour | Death of Incumbent | 17 April 2008 | Edward Timpson | Conservative |
| Henley | 26 June 2008 | Boris Johnson | Conservative | Resigned due to becoming the Mayor of London | 4 June 2008 | John Howell | Conservative |
| Haltemprice and Howden | 10 July 2008 | David Davis | Conservative | Resigned and successfully stood for re-election, in protest over the Government's policy of detaining terror suspects for up to 42 days without charge. | 12 June 2008 | David Davis | Conservative |
| Glasgow East | 24 July 2008 | David Marshall | Labour | Resigned due to ill health | 30 June 2008 | John Mason | SNP |
| Glenrothes | 6 November 2008 | John MacDougall | Labour | Death of Incumbent | 13 August 2008 | Lindsay Roy | Labour |
| Norwich North | 23 July 2009 | Ian Gibson | Labour | Resigned after a Labour Party panel prohibited him from standing for re-election. | 5 June 2009 | Chloe Smith | Conservative |
| Glasgow North East | 12 November 2009 | Michael Martin | Speaker | Resigned during the 2009 expenses scandal. | 21 June 2009 | Willie Bain | Labour |

== Defections, suspensions, resignations and deaths ==
| Name | Date | From | To | Constituency | Reason |
|---|---|---|---|---|---|
| Patsy Calton | 29 May 2005 | Liberal Democrats | Seat vacant | Cheadle | Death (Cancer) |
| Robin Cook | 6 August 2005 | Labour | Seat vacant | Livingston | Death (Heart attack, fell off a ridge) |
| Rachel Squire | 6 January 2006 | Labour | Seat vacant | Dunfermline and West Fife | Death (Brain tumor) |
| Peter Law | 25 April 2006 | Independent | Seat vacant | Blaenau Gwent | Death (Brain tumor) |
| Eric Forth | 17 May 2006 | Conservative | Seat vacant | Bromley and Chislehurst | Death (Cancer) |
| Clare Short | 20 October 2006 | Labour | Independent Labour | Birmingham Ladywood | Resigned the Labour Whip |
| Piara Khabra | 19 June 2007 | Labour | Seat vacant | Ealing Southall | Death (liver problems) |
| Quentin Davies | 26 June 2007 | Conservative | Labour | Grantham and Stamford | Thought that the Conservative Party "ceased collectively to believe in anything" |
| Tony Blair | 27 June 2007 | Labour | Seat Vacant | Sedgefield | Resignation to become Middle East Envoy |
| Bob Wareing | 17 September 2007 | Labour | Independent | Liverpool West Derby | Defeated in a Labour party selection contest |
| Andrew Pelling | 18 September 2007 | Conservative | Independent Conservative | Croydon Central | Whip removed over assault allegations |
| Andrew Pelling | October 2008 | Independent Conservative | Independent | Croydon Central | Whip removed over assault allegations |
| Derek Conway | 29 January 2008 | Conservative | Independent | Old Bexley and Sidcup | Suspended from the Conservative Party on after allegations of corruption. |
| Bob Spink | 12 March 2008 | Conservative | Independent | Castle Point | Resigned the Conservative whip on 12 March 2008; joined the UKIP on 21 April 2008, and later designated as "independent" (as UKIP had no whip in Parliament). |
| Gwyneth Dunwoody | 17 April 2008 | Labour | Seat Vacant | Crewe and Nantwich | Death (heart surgery) |
| Boris Johnson | 4 June 2008 | Conservative | Seat vacant | Henley | Resigned due to becoming the Mayor of London. |
| David Davis | 12 June 2008 | Conservative | Seat vacant | Haltemprice and Howden | Resigned and successfully stood for re-election, in protest over the Government's policy of detaining terror suspects for up to 42 days without charge. |
| David Marshall | 30 June 2008 | Labour | Seat vacant | Glasgow East | Resigned due to ill health |
| Michael Martin | 21 June 2009 | Speaker | Seat vacant | Glasgow North East | Resigned during the 2009 expenses scandal. |
| John Bercow | 22 June 2009 | Conservative | Speaker | Buckingham | Elected to become the Speaker |
| David Taylor | 26 December 2009 | Labour | Seat Vacant | North West Leicestershire | Death of incumbent |
| Iris Robinson | 18 January 2010 | DUP | Seat Vacant | Strangford | Resigned due to the Iris Robinson Scandal |
| David Chaytor | 8 February 2010 | Labour | Independent | Bury North | Labour whips suspended due to criminal charges over the 2009 expenses scandal. |
| Jim Devine | 8 February 2010 | Labour | Independent | Livingston | Labour whips suspended due to criminal charges over the 2009 expenses scandal. |
| Elliot Morley | 8 February 2010 | Labour | Independent | Scunthorpe | Labour whips suspended due to criminal charges over the 2009 expenses scandal. |
| Ashok Kumar | 15 March 2010 | Labour | Seat vacant | Middlesbrough South and East Cleveland | Death of incumbent |
| Sylvia Hermon | 25 March 2010 | UUP | Independent | North Down | To stand as an independent candidate in the forthcoming general election. |

== Progression of Government majority and party totals ==
| Date | Event | Labour | Working majority | Conservative | Liberal Democrats | DUP | SNP | Plaid Cymru | SDLP | UUP | Health Concern | Respect | Independent | Independent Labour | Sinn Féin | Speaker | Vacant |
|---|---|---|---|---|---|---|---|---|---|---|---|---|---|---|---|---|---|
| 5 May 2005 | Elected at General Election | 355 | 71 | 198 | 62 | 9 | 6 | 3 | 3 | 1 | 1 | 1 | 1 | 0 | 5 | 1 | 0 |
| 29 May 2005 | Calton (Liberal Democrats), dies | 355 | 73 | 198 | 61 | 9 | 6 | 3 | 3 | 1 | 1 | 1 | 1 | 0 | 5 | 1 | 1 |
| 14 July 2005 | Hunter (Liberal Democrats), elected in Cheadle | 355 | 71 | 198 | 62 | 9 | 6 | 3 | 3 | 1 | 1 | 1 | 1 | 0 | 5 | 1 | 0 |
| 6 August 2005 | Cook (Labour), dies | 354 | 70 | 198 | 62 | 9 | 6 | 3 | 3 | 1 | 1 | 1 | 1 | 0 | 5 | 1 | 1 |
| 29 September 2005 | Devine (Labour), elected in Livingston | 355 | 71 | 198 | 62 | 9 | 6 | 3 | 3 | 1 | 1 | 1 | 1 | 0 | 5 | 1 | 0 |
| 5 January 2006 | Squire (Labour), dies | 354 | 70 | 198 | 62 | 9 | 6 | 3 | 3 | 1 | 1 | 1 | 1 | 0 | 5 | 1 | 1 |
| 9 February 2006 | Rennie (Liberal Democrats), elected in Dunfermline and West Fife | 354 | 69 | 198 | 63 | 9 | 6 | 3 | 3 | 1 | 1 | 1 | 1 | 0 | 5 | 1 | 0 |
| 25 April 2006 | Law (Independent), dies | 354 | 71 | 198 | 63 | 9 | 6 | 3 | 3 | 1 | 1 | 1 | 0 | 0 | 5 | 1 | 1 |
| 17 May 2006 | Forth (Conservative), dies | 354 | 73 | 197 | 63 | 9 | 6 | 3 | 3 | 1 | 1 | 1 | 0 | 0 | 5 | 1 | 2 |
| 29 June 2006 | Davies (Independent), elected in Blaenau Gwent | 354 | 69 | 198 | 63 | 9 | 6 | 3 | 3 | 1 | 1 | 1 | 1 | 0 | 5 | 1 | 0 |
| 29 June 2006 | Neil (Conservative), elected in Bromley and Chislehurst | 354 | 69 | 198 | 63 | 9 | 6 | 3 | 3 | 1 | 1 | 1 | 1 | 0 | 5 | 1 | 0 |
| 20 October 2006 | Short (Labour), resigns whip | 353 | 67 | 198 | 63 | 9 | 6 | 3 | 3 | 1 | 1 | 1 | 1 | 1 | 5 | 1 | 0 |
| 19 June 2007 | Khabra (Labour), dies | 352 | 66 | 198 | 63 | 9 | 6 | 3 | 3 | 1 | 1 | 1 | 1 | 1 | 5 | 1 | 1 |
| 26 June 2007 | Davies (Conservative), defects to Labour | 353 | 68 | 197 | 63 | 9 | 6 | 3 | 3 | 1 | 1 | 1 | 1 | 1 | 5 | 1 | 1 |
| 27 June 2007 | Blair (Labour), resigns | 352 | 67 | 197 | 63 | 9 | 6 | 3 | 3 | 1 | 1 | 1 | 1 | 1 | 5 | 1 | 2 |
| 19 July 2007 | Sharma (Labour), elected in Ealing Southall | 354 | 69 | 197 | 63 | 9 | 6 | 3 | 3 | 1 | 1 | 1 | 1 | 1 | 5 | 1 | 0 |
| 19 July 2007 | Wilson (Labour), elected in Sedgefield | 354 | 69 | 197 | 63 | 9 | 6 | 3 | 3 | 1 | 1 | 1 | 1 | 1 | 5 | 1 | 0 |
| 17 September 2007 | Wareing (Labour), resigns whip | 353 | 67 | 197 | 63 | 9 | 6 | 3 | 3 | 1 | 1 | 1 | 2 | 1 | 5 | 1 | 0 |
| 18 September 2007 | Pelling (Conservative), has whip removed | 353 | 67 | 196 | 63 | 9 | 6 | 3 | 3 | 1 | 1 | 1 | 3 | 1 | 5 | 1 | 0 |

== See also ==
- Results of the 2005 United Kingdom general election
- List of United Kingdom MPs by seniority, 2005–10
- List of MPs for Northern Ireland
- List of MPs for Scotland
- List of MPs for England
- List of MPs for Wales
