= Birmingham North =

Birmingham North may refer to:

- Birmingham North (European Parliament constituency)
- Birmingham North (UK Parliament constituency)

== See also ==
- North Birmingham
