= Justice Select Committee =

UK House of Commons select committee

Video: The role of the Justice Committee

The Justice Select Committee of the United Kingdom is a select committee of the House of Commons which scrutinizes the policy, administration, and spending of the Ministry of Justice. In addition, the committee examines the work of the Law Officers of the Crown, the Serious Fraud Office, and the Crown Prosecution Service. The committee also reviews draft Sentencing Guidelines issued by the Sentencing Council (formerly the Sentencing Guidelines Council.)

The committee scrutinises the work of the Secretary of State for Justice, Attorney General, Solicitor General and the Minister of State for Prisons among others.

== Chairs ==
Committee chairs include those listed below.

Name	Start	End	Party	Constituency
Alan Beith	January 2003	30 March 2015	Liberal Democrats	Berwick-upon-Tweed
Bob Neill	18 June 2015	30 May 2024	Conservative	Bromley and Chislehurst
Andy Slaughter	11 September 2024	21 July 2026	Labour	Hammersmith and Chiswick
Catherine Atkinson	14 September 2026	present	Labour	Derby North

== Current membership ==
Membership of the committee is as follows:

Member	Party	Constituency
Catherine Atkinson MP (Chair)	Labour	Derby North
Matt Bishop MP	Labour	Forest of Dean
Janet Daby MP	Labour	Lewisham East
Ashley Fox MP	Conservative	Bridgwater
Warinder Juss MP	Labour	Wolverhampton West
Tessa Munt MP	Liberal Democrats	Wells and Mendip Hills
Jon Pearce MP	Labour	High Peak
Sarah Russell MP	Labour	Congleton
Neil Shastri-Hurst MP	Conservative	Solihull West and Shirley
Vikki Slade MP	Liberal Democrats	Mid Dorset and North Poole
Tony Vaughan KC MP	Labour	Folkestone and Hythe

=== Changes since 2024 ===
Date	Outgoing Member & Party	Constituency	→	New Member & Party	Constituency	Source
17 March 2025	Alex Barros-Curtis MP (Labour)	Cardiff West	→	Matt Bishop MP (Labour)	Forest of Dean	Hansard
27 October 2025	Mike Tapp MP (Labour)	Dover and Deal	→	Tony Vaughan MP (Labour)	Folkestone and Hythe	Hansard
13 November 2025	Josh Babarinde MP (Liberal Democrats)	Eastbourne	→	Vikki Slade MP (Liberal Democrats)	Mid Dorset and North Poole	Hansard
22 June 2026	Linsey Farnsworth MP (Labour)	Amber Valley	→	Janet Daby MP (Labour)	Lewisham East	Hansard
1 September 2026	Andy Slaughter MP (chair, Labour)	Hammersmith and Chiswick	→	Vacant		Hansard
14 September 2026	Vacant		→	Catherine Atkinson MP (Chair, Labour)	Derby North	Hansard
26 October 2026	Pam Cox MP (Labour)	Colchester	→	Jon Pearce MP (Labour)	High Peak	Hansard

== 2019-2024 Parliament ==
The chair was elected on 29 January 2020, with the members of the committee being announced on 2 March 2020.

Member	Party	Constituency
Robert Neill MP (Chair)	Conservative	Bromley and Chislehurst
Rob Butler MP	Conservative	Aylesbury
James Daly MP	Conservative	Bury North
Sarah Dines MP	Conservative	Derbyshire Dales
Maria Eagle MP	Labour	Garston and Halewood
John Howell MP	Conservative	Hendon
Kenny MacAskill MP	SNP	East Lothian
Kieran Mullan MP	Conservative	Crewe and Nantwich
Ellie Reeves MP	Labour	Lewisham West and Penge
Marie Rimmer MP	Labour	St Helens South and Whiston
Andy Slaughter MP	Labour	Hammersmith

=== Changes 2019-2024 ===
Date	Outgoing Member & Party	Constituency	→	New Member & Party	Constituency	Source
11 May 2020	Ellie Reeves MP (Labour)	Lewisham West and Penge	→	Paula Barker MP (Labour)	Liverpool Wavertree	Hansard
11 May 2020	Marie Rimmer MP (Labour)	St Helens South and Whiston	→	Richard Burgon MP (Labour)	Leeds East	Hansard
22 February 2021	Richard Burgon MP (Labour)	Leeds East	→	Janet Daby MP (Labour)	Lewisham East	Hansard
25 May 2021	Kenny MacAskill MP (Alba)	East Lothian	→	Angela Crawley MP (SNP)	Lanark and Hamilton East	Hansard
8 June 2021	John Howell MP (Conservative)	Hendon	→	Laura Farris MP (Conservative)	Newbury	Hansard
13 July 2021	Paula Barker MP (Labour)	Liverpool Wavertree	→	Kate Hollern MP (Labour)	Blackburn	Hansard
2 November 2021	Sarah Dines MP (Conservative)	Derbyshire Dales	→	Paul Maynard MP (Conservative)	Blackpool North and Cleveleys	Hansard
5 January 2022	Janet Daby MP (Labour)	Lewisham East	→	Diane Abbott MP (Labour)	Hackney North and Stoke Newington	Hansard
15 March 2022	James Daly MP (Conservative)	Bury North	→	Matt Vickers MP (Conservative)	Stockton South	Hansard
17 May 2022	Andy Slaughter MP (Labour)	Hammersmith	→	Karl Turner MP (Labour)	Kingston upon Hull East	Hansard
27 June 2022	Matt Vickers MP (Conservative)	Stockton South	→	James Daly MP (Conservative)	Bury North	Hansard
29 November 2022	Diane Abbott MP (Labour)	Hackney North and Stoke Newington	→	Janet Daby MP (Labour)	Lewisham East	Hansard
29 November 2022	Laura Farris MP (Conservative)	Newbury	→	Edward Timpson MP (Conservative)	Eddisbury	Hansard
28 March 2023	Angela Crawley MP (SNP)	Lanark and Hamilton East	→	Stuart McDonald MP (SNP)	Cumbernauld, Kilsyth and Kirkintilloch East	Hansard
28 March 2023	Kate Hollern MP (Labour)	Birmingham Hall Green	→	Tahir Ali MP (Labour)	Blackburn	Hansard
12 September 2023	Stuart McDonald MP (SNP)	Cumbernauld, Kilsyth and Kirkintilloch East	→	Chris Stephens MP (SNP)	Glasgow South West	Hansard
5 December 2023	Janet Daby MP (Labour)	Lewisham East	→	Rachel Hopkins MP (Labour)	Luton South	Hansard
20 February 2024	Rob Butler MP (Conservative)	Aylesbury	→	Vacant		Hansard
30 April 2024	Maria Eagle MP (Labour)	Garston and Halewood	→	Bambos Charalambous MP (Labour)	Enfield Southgate	Hansard
30 April 2024	Karl Turner MP (Labour)	Kingston upon Hull East	→	Yasmin Qureshi MP (Labour)	Bolton South East	Hansard
14 May 2024	Paul Maynard MP (Conservative)	Blackpool North and Cleveleys	→	Andy Carter MP (Conservative)	Warrington South	Hansard
14 May 2024	Vacant		→	Dehenna Davison MP (Conservative)	Bishop Auckland	Hansard

== 2017–2019 Parliament ==
The chair was elected on 12 July 2017, with the members of the committee being announced on 11 September 2017.

Member	Party	Constituency
Robert Neill MP (Chair)	Conservative	Bromley and Chislehurst
Kemi Badenoch MP	Conservative	Saffron Walden
Ruth Cadbury MP	Labour	Brentford and Isleworth
Alex Chalk MP	Conservative	Cheltenham
Bambos Charalambous MP	Labour	Enfield, Southgate
Mr David Hanson MP	Labour	Delyn
John Howell MP	Conservative	Henley
Gavin Newlands MP	Scottish National Party	Paisley and Renfrewshire North
Laura Pidcock MP	Labour	North West Durham
Victoria Prentis MP	Conservative	Banbury
Ellie Reeves MP	Labour	Lewisham West and Penge

=== Changes 2017–2019 ===
Date	Outgoing Member & Party	Constituency	→	New Member & Party	Constituency	Source
5 February 2018	Laura Pidcock MP (Labour)	North West Durham	→	Marie Rimmer MP (Labour)	St Helens South and Whiston	Hansard
19 November 2018	Ruth Cadbury MP (Labour)	Brentford and Isleworth	→	Janet Daby MP (Labour)	Lewisham East	Hansard
21 January 2019	Alex Chalk MP (Conservative)	Cheltenham	→	Robert Courts MP (Conservative)	Witney	Hansard
8 May 2019	Janet Daby MP (Labour)	Lewisham East	→	Andy Slaughter MP (Labour)	Hammersmith	Hansard
15 July 2019	Kemi Badenoch MP (Conservative)	Saffron Walden	→	Andrew Griffiths MP (Conservative)	Burton	Hansard

== 2015–2017 Parliament ==
The chair was elected on 18 June 2015, with members being announced on 6 July 2015.

Member	Party	Constituency
Robert Neill MP (Chair)	Conservative	Bromley and Chislehurst
Richard Arkless MP	Scottish National Party	Dumfries and Galloway
Richard Burgon MP	Labour	Leeds East
Alex Chalk MP	Conservative	Cheltenham
Alberto Costa MP	Conservative	South Leicestershire
Philip Davies MP	Conservative	Shipley
Sue Hayman MP	Labour	Workington
John Howell MP	Conservative	Henley
Victoria Prentis MP	Conservative	Banbury
Christina Rees MP	Labour and Co-op	Neath
Nick Thomas-Symonds MP	Labour	Torfaen

=== Changes 2015–2017 ===
Date	Outgoing Member & Party	Constituency	→	New Member & Party	Constituency	Source
26 October 2015	Richard Burgon MP (Labour)	Leeds East	→	David Hanson MP (Labour)	Delyn	Hansard
26 October 2015	Sue Hayman MP (Labour)	Workington	→	Rupa Huq MP (Labour)	Ealing Central and Acton	Hansard
26 October 2015	Christina Rees MP (Labour)	Neath	→	Andy McDonald MP (Labour)	Middlesbrough	Hansard
26 October 2015	Nick Thomas-Symonds MP (Labour)	Torfaen (UK Parliament constituency)	→	Marie Rimmer MP (Labour)	St Helens South and Whiston	Hansard
13 June 2016	Andy McDonald MP (Labour)	Middlesbrough	→	Chris Elmore MP (Labour)	Ogmore	Hansard
31 October 2016	Rupa Huq MP (Labour)	Ealing Central and Acton	→	Kate Green MP (Labour) (Note: Unusually, this change was debated by the House of Commons. Andrew Bridgen objected to the appointment of Vaz, due to allegations surrounding drug usage and prostitutes. He did not object to the appointment of Green, but because both appointments were part of the same motion, her appointment was voted on as well. The appointment passed by 203 votes to 7.)	Stretford and Urmston	Hansard
31 October 2016	Andy McDonald MP (Labour)	Middlesbrough	→	Keith Vaz MP (Labour)	Leicester East	Hansard
13 March 2017	Marie Rimmer MP (Labour)	St Helens South and Whiston	→	Jo Stevens MP (Labour)	Cardiff Central	Hansard

== 2010–2015 Parliament ==
The chair was elected on 10 June 2010, with members being announced on 12 July 2010.

Member	Party	Constituency
Sir Alan Beith MP (Chair)	Liberal Democrats	Berwick-upon-Tweed
Robert Buckland MP	Conservative	South Swindon
Chris Evans MP	Labour and Co-op	Islwyn
Helen Grant MP	Conservative	Maidstone and The Weald
Siân James MP	Labour	Swansea East
Jessica Lee MP	Conservative	Erewash
Elfyn Llwyd MP	Plaid Cymru	Dwyfor Meirionnydd
Claire Perry MP	Conservative	Devizes
Yasmin Qureshi MP	Labour	Bolton South East
Linda Riordan MP	Labour and Co-op	Halifax
Anna Soubry MP	Conservative	Broxtowe
Karl Turner MP	Labour	Kingston upon Hull East

=== Changes 2010–2015 ===
Date	Outgoing Member & Party	Constituency	→	New Member & Party	Constituency	Source
29 November 2010	Jessica Lee MP (Conservative)	Erewash	→	Ben Gummer MP (Conservative)	Ipswich	Hansard
29 November 2010	Anna Soubry MP (Conservative)	Broxtowe	→	Liz Truss MP (Conservative)	South West Norfolk	Hansard
16 May 2011	Siân James MP (Labour)	Swansea East	→	Jeremy Corbyn MP (Labour)	Islington North	Hansard
31 October 2011	Helen Grant MP (Conservative)	Maidstone and The Weald	→	Nick de Bois MP (Conservative)	Enfield North	Hansard
5 December 2011	Claire Perry MP (Conservative)	Devizes	→	Steve Brine MP (Conservative)	Winchester	Hansard
6 February 2012	Linda Riordan MP (Labour and Co-op)	Halifax	→	Seema Malhotra MP (Labour and Co-op)	Feltham and Heston	Hansard
5 November 2012	Ben Gummer MP (Conservative)	Ipswich	→	Rehman Chishti MP (Conservative)	Gillingham and Rainham	Hansard
5 November 2012	Liz Truss MP (Conservative)	South West Norfolk	→	Bob Neill MP (Conservative)	Bromley and Chislehurst	Hansard
10 December 2012	Chris Evans MP (Labour and Co-op)	Islwyn	→	Andy McDonald MP (Labour)	Middlesbrough	Hansard
21 January 2013	Karl Turner MP (Labour)	Kingston upon Hull East	→	Graham Stringer MP (Labour)	Blackley and Broughton	Hansard
11 February 2013	Robert Buckland MP (Conservative)	Swindon South	→	Gareth Johnson MP (Conservative)	Dartford	Hansard
11 February 2013	Bob Neill MP (Conservative)	Bromley and Chislehurst	→	Mike Weatherley MP (Conservative)	Hove	Hansard
4 November 2013	Mike Weatherley MP (Conservative)	Hove	→	Christopher Chope MP (Conservative)	Christchurch	Hansard
25 November 2013	Seema Malhotra MP (Labour and Co-op)	Feltham and Heston	→	John McDonnell MP (Labour)	Hayes and Harlington	Hansard
24 February 2014	Graham Stringer MP (Labour)	Blackley and Broughton	→	John Cryer MP (Labour)	Leyton and Wanstead	Hansard
10 June 2014	Gareth Johnson MP (Conservative)	Dartford	→	Robert Buckland MP (Conservative)	Swindon South	Hansard
8 September 2014	Robert Buckland MP (Conservative)	Swindon South	→	John Howell MP (Conservative)	Henley	Hansard

== See also ==
- Parliamentary committees of the United Kingdom
