= Monetary reform in Britain =

Reform of money supply and the banking system in the Britain

Monetary reform is the process of fundamentally changing policies regarding money. It can include changes to the money creation process, fractional-reserve banking, financial institutions, financing of the economy and social credit among other things.

== History ==
=== 19th century ===
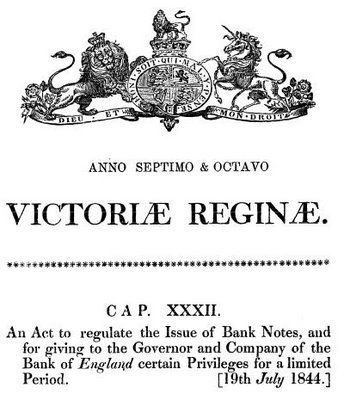
Bank Charter Act 1844

British monetary reform has historical roots in questioning the gold standard during the Industrial Revolution. The Currency School and Banking School debates of the 1840s laid groundwork for later reform movements, particularly around the Bank Charter Act of 1844.

=== Post-World War I ===
The economic disruptions following World War I sparked renewed interest in monetary reform. John Maynard Keynes published A Tract on Monetary Reform in 1923. Unemployment, economic instability, and gold standard issues created interest in alternative economic theories.

=== C. H. Douglas and the Social Credit-movement ===
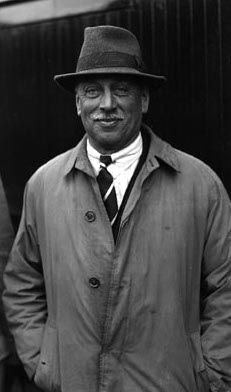
C. H. Douglas, founder of the Social Credit-theory. Photo taken in Edmonton, Alberta, Canada, 1934.

In the years around 1920 the British engineer C. H. Douglas developed a theory on banking and welfare distribution, a theory which he called "Social Credit", and which soon became the cornerstone of an international movement with the same name. However, Douglas himself warned against viewing the Social Credit solely as a scheme for monetary reform. Personally he preferred to describe it as "the policy of a philosophy" or, to be exact, the policy of "practical Christianity". This policy, linked to this philosophy, is all about dispersing economic and political power to individuals. As he once wrote, "Systems were made for men, and not men for systems, and the interest of man which is self-development, is above all systems, whether theological, political or economic."

=== Monetarist transition (1970s-1980s) ===
The collapse of the Bretton Woods system led to fundamental reconsideration of monetary frameworks. Milton Friedman's monetarist theories gained significant influence in British policy circles, culminating in the adoption of the Medium Term Financial Strategy under the Thatcher government.

Reform movements during this period included:

- Monetary targeting experiments that questioned discretionary policy
- Supply-side economics integration with monetary reform ideas
- Growing criticism of government monetary intervention

=== Bank of England independence movement (1990s) ===
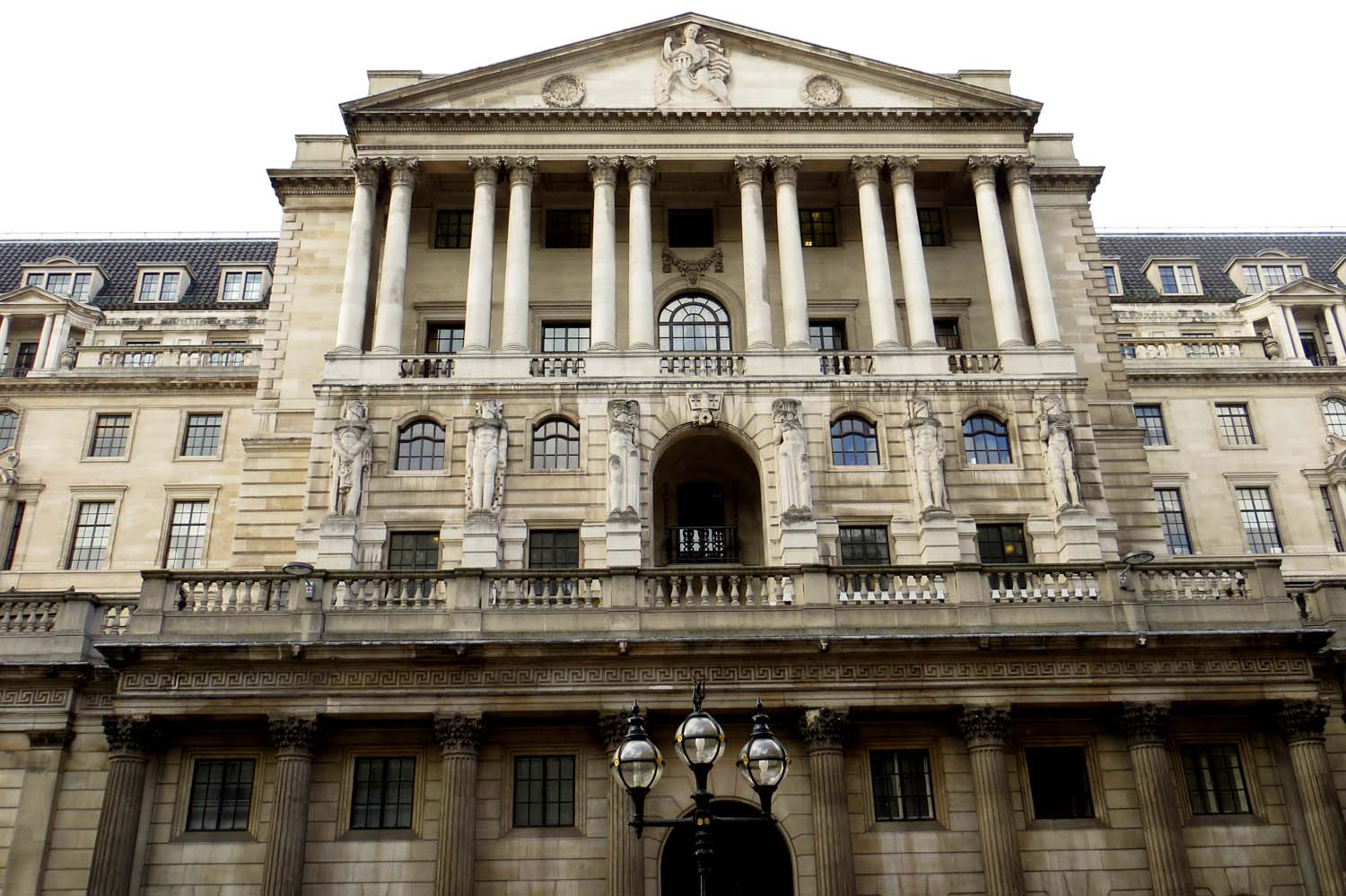
The Bank of England on Threadneedle Street

After a campaign for central bank independence, the Bank of England achieved operational independence in 1997 with inflation targeting as the primary monetary policy framework.

The independence movement involved:

- Cross-party parliamentary support
- Academic consensus building
- International comparative analysis
- Economic modernization efforts

== Parliamentary engagement ==
=== Parliamentary commissions and reports ===
The Radcliffe report (1959) represented the most comprehensive parliamentary investigation into British monetary systems in the post-war era. The report challenged conventional monetary theory and influenced subsequent policy debates.

Following the Libor scandal, the Parliamentary Commission on Banking Standards (2013) published "Changing banking for good" - a comprehensive report outlining radical banking industry reforms. The Independent Commission on Banking recommended "ring fencing" retail deposits, which was passed in the 2013 Financial Services (Banking Reform) Act.

== Recent development and debate ==
Michael Rowbotham's The Grip of Death, published 1998, was an attack on the banking system as well as the politics of globalization, free trade and growth-oriented strategies based on these lines. The book was widely spread and got reviews in magazines such as The Ecologist, Resurgence, New Internationalist, The Tribune, The Tablet, Sustainable Economics, Permaculture Magazine, Food Magazine and Social Credit. Some of the British monetary reformers, such as Michael Rowbotham, are influenced by the Social Credit-movement.

The Money Reform Party was founded by Anne Belsey from Kent in 2005 and deregistered in 2014. Belsey stood for the MRP in the 2006 Bromley and Chislehurst by-election and came last with 33 votes. She stood in Canterbury in 2010 and came last with 173 votes. Author Mark Braund recommended the MRP website "which includes a compelling explanation of the mechanics of money creation and its impact on society".

=== 2008 financial crisis ===
The 2008 financial crisis sparked significant renewed interest in monetary reform. Several organizations emerged or gained prominence:

- Positive Money became a leading advocacy group, promoting sovereign money creation.
- New Economics Foundation contributed research and policy proposals for banking sector reform.

== Key reform proposals ==
=== Sovereign money creation ===
Proponents argue that money creation should be a sovereign government function rather than a private banking privilege.

This would involve:

- Transferring money creation powers to a public institution
- Eliminating fractional-reserve banking

=== Specific policy proposals and mechanisms ===
Ring-fencing proposals from the Independent Commission on Banking represented significant policy development, though falling short of full structural separation advocated by reform movements.

Digital currency initiatives have gained attention, with the Bank of England exploring central bank digital currency options that could fundamentally alter monetary systems.

A quantitative easing alternative is direct distribution to citizens rather than through financial markets.

Britain has had numerous local currency initiatives from the Totnes pound to time banks.

== Papers ==
- 2010 – Towards a Twenty-First Century Banking and Monetary System, Joint Submission to the Independent Commission on Banking, UK (Chair: Professor Sir John Vickers), with Ben Dyson, Tony Greenham, Josh Ryan-Collins, by the Centre for Banking, Finance and Sustainable Development, the new economics foundation, and Positive Money, submitted 19 November 2010 PDF

== See also ==
- List of monetary reformers
- Universal basic income in the United Kingdom
