= Bob Neill =

British Conservative politician (born 1952)

Sir Bob Neill KC
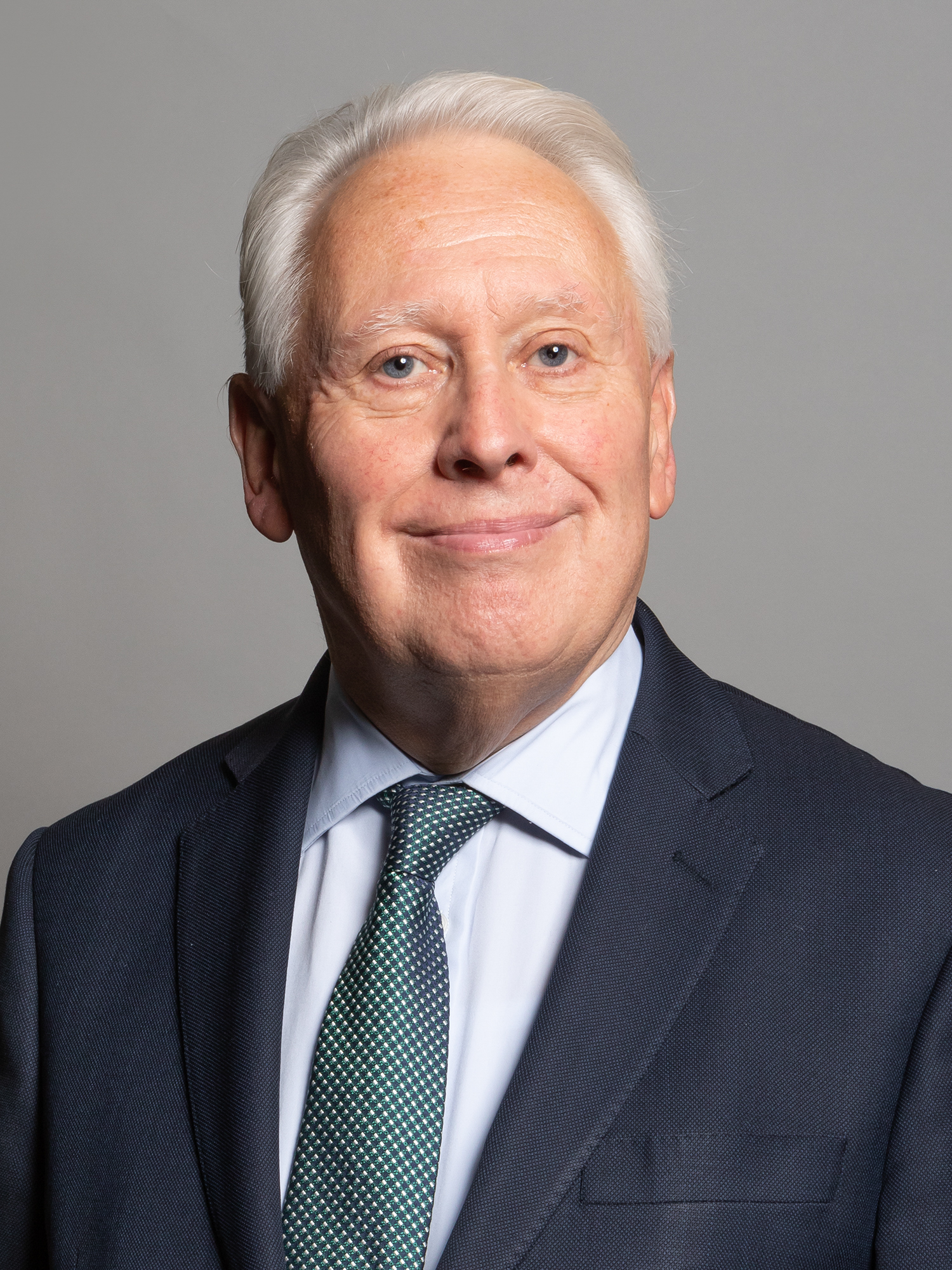
- Official portrait, 2020

Chair of the Justice Select Committee
- In office 19 June 2015 – 30 May 2024
- Preceded by: Sir Alan Beith
- Succeeded by: Andy Slaughter

Parliamentary Under-Secretary of State for London, Local Government and Planning
- In office 14 May 2010 – 4 September 2012
- Prime Minister: David Cameron
- Preceded by: Ian Austin
- Succeeded by: Brandon Lewis

Shadow Minister for Communities and Local Government
- In office 3 July 2007 – 6 May 2010
- Leader: David Cameron
- Preceded by: Eric Pickles
- Succeeded by: Ian Austin

Member of Parliament for Bromley and Chislehurst
- In office 29 June 2006 – 30 May 2024
- Preceded by: Eric Forth
- Succeeded by: Constituency abolished

Leader of the Conservative Party in the London Assembly
- In office 2004–2006
- Preceded by: Eric Ollerenshaw
- Succeeded by: Angie Bray

Member of the London Assembly for Bexley and Bromley
- In office 4 May 2000 – 3 May 2008
- Preceded by: Constituency established
- Succeeded by: James Cleverly

Member of the Havering London Borough Council for Harold Wood
- In office 2 May 1974 – 3 May 1990

Member of the Greater London Council for Romford
- In office 11 July 1985 – 31 March 1986

Personal details
- Born: Robert James MacGillivray Neill; 24 June 1952 (age 74) Ilford, England
- Party: Conservative
- Spouses: Daphne White (m. 2009; div. 2015) Ann-Louise Whittaker (m. 2018)
- Education: London School of Economics
- Occupation: Politician
- Profession: Barrister
- Website: www.bobneill.org.uk

Sir Robert James MacGillivray Neill KC (Hon) (born 24 June 1952) is a British barrister and Conservative Party politician. He served as the Member of Parliament (MP) for Bromley and Chislehurst from 2006 to 2024.

He served as a Parliamentary Under Secretary of State at the Department of Communities and Local Government from 14 May 2010 to 4 September 2012. He latterly served as Chair of Parliament's Justice Select Committee.

== Biography ==
Neill was born in Ilford to John Macgillivray Neill and Elsie May Neill (née Chaston). Neill attended Abbs Cross Technical High School in Hornchurch. He took his law degree at the London School of Economics and subsequently worked as a barrister specialising in criminal law.

He was elected as a councillor for Harold Wood ward in the London Borough of Havering at the 1978 election and was subsequently re-elected to Havering London Borough Council in 1982 and 1986, going out of office in 1990. He was elected at a by-election in 1985 to serve as Greater London Council member for Romford, going out of office in 1986.

He stood for the Dagenham parliamentary constituency in 1983, at the age of 30, coming within 2,997 votes of winning the historically Labour seat from Bryan Gould MP. He refought the seat in 1987, coming even closer to winning by slightly cutting the Labour majority to 2,469, but Gould defeated him again. He also stood for election in the London Borough of Tower Hamlets in 1994 and 1998.

Neill was first elected to the London Assembly in the 2000 assembly election, and served as the Conservative member for Bexley and Bromley from 2000 until 2008. He served as Leader of the Conservative Group on the Assembly from 2000 to 2002 and again from 2004.

Between January 2013 and March 2015 he also served as a substitute member on the Parliamentary Assembly of the Council of Europe. A pro-European, he supported former Conservative Chancellor Kenneth Clarke in both of his bids for the leadership of the Conservative Party.

Neill is a Freemason. Since April 2017, Neill has been a Bencher at the Middle Temple.

Neill was married from 2009 until 2015 to former Southend Conservative Councillor and former Mayor, Daphne White. In July 2018 he married Ann-Louise Whittaker, a music teacher and former opera singer and performer.

== Bromley and Chislehurst by-election ==
Following the death of Eric Forth in May 2006, on 3 June 2006 he was adopted as the Conservative candidate for the Bromley and Chislehurst by-election which took place on 29 June 2006. His selection by the local Conservative Association raised eyebrows, as new leader David Cameron had pressed for an "A-List" candidate, to help present Cameron's vision of the new Conservative Party. The Parliamentary constituency formed a part of Neill's London Assembly constituency. He stated at his selection that he would not resign his London Assembly seat as the resultant by-election, which would see around 400,000 voters go to the polls, would be unduly expensive.

A few questions were raised about Neill's position as a non-executive director of the North East London Strategic Health Authority, which fell foul of the House of Commons Disqualification Act of 1975. His response was that, because the body was due to be abolished before he would have had the chance to take his seat in Westminster, any such arguments were immaterial.

Neill won the by-election by just 633 votes, compared to the 13,342 majority achieved by his predecessor at the 2005 general election. Factors contributing to this were assumed by commentators to include a substantial drop in the turnout (down from 64.8 to 40.18%), with the drop disproportionally hitting the Conservative vote; the presence of a high-profile UKIP candidate, Nigel Farage – Labour ended up coming fourth, after UKIP; and a campaign by the Liberal Democrats that heavily focused on Neill personally. In his acceptance speech Neill criticised "a minority of candidates" (which was assumed to be specifically criticising the Liberal Democrat candidate) for their ad hominem attacks on him. These included statements regarding Neill's occupations outside his future parliamentary role (including the nickname "Three Jobs Bob") and the fact that, at that time, he did not live in the constituency, although he has since purchased a house there.

== In parliament ==
In 2008 Neill was made Shadow Local Government Minister and Deputy Chairman of the Conservative Party and was assigned the shadow planning brief from January 2009. He was elected as MP for a second term in the May 2010 election and worked as Parliamentary Under Secretary of State at the Department of Communities and Local Government until September 2012, when he was named Vice Chairman of the Conservative party for Local Government.

Neill's approach to statistics and parliamentary privilege has been questioned by Dr Ben Goldacre. Neill claimed local government could save 20% from all services, based on a management consultant's estimate of how much could be saved from mobile phone bills.

As of 2008, Neill claims an allowance for a second home outside London, despite his constituency home being only 12 miles from Westminster. A spokesman said that his claims were "in accordance with the rules".

Neill was re-elected for a third term in May 2015, shortly after which he was elected as Chairman of Parliament's Justice Select Committee. Following the General Election on 8 June 2017, he was returned to this role.

Neill was strongly opposed to Brexit prior to the 2016 referendum. On 7 February 2017, along with six other Conservative Members of Parliament, he defied the Party whip and voted in favour of New Clause 110 of the European Union (Withdrawal) Bill. In December 2017, in the same bill, he voted along with fellow Conservative Dominic Grieve and nine other Tory MPs against the government, and in favour of guaranteeing Parliament a "meaningful vote" on any deal Theresa May agrees with Brussels over Brexit.

Neill maintains Legal aid should be more widely available. Neill said in 2018 that cuts to legal aid had gone too far, stating: "The evidence is pretty compelling that changes are needed … We cannot expect people who often have multiple problems in their lives necessarily to be able to resolve such things on their own."

Neill was knighted in the 2020 New Year Honours for political service.

In September 2020 Neill asked Northern Ireland Secretary Brandon Lewis for assurance that the published Internal Market Bill would not breach international law and Lewis admitted that it would do so "in a very specific and limited way."

In May 2022, following the publication of the Sue Gray report, Neill submitted a letter of no confidence in Prime Minister Johnson calling for his resignation.

Neill was appointed an Honorary King's Counsel (KC) on 19 January 2024.

On 1 February 2024 he announced he would not seek re-election at the 2024 general election. This was to spend more time with his wife Ann who suffered a stroke in 2019.

Political offices
New creation	Member of the London Assembly for Bexley and Bromley; 2000–2008	Succeeded by James Cleverly
Parliament of the United Kingdom
Preceded by Eric Forth	Member of Parliament for Bromley and Chislehurst; 2006–2024	Constituency abolished
