= 2006 Bromley and Chislehurst by-election =

By-election due to death of MP

- 29 June 2006

Bromley and Chislehurst parliamentary seat
- Turnout: 40.2%
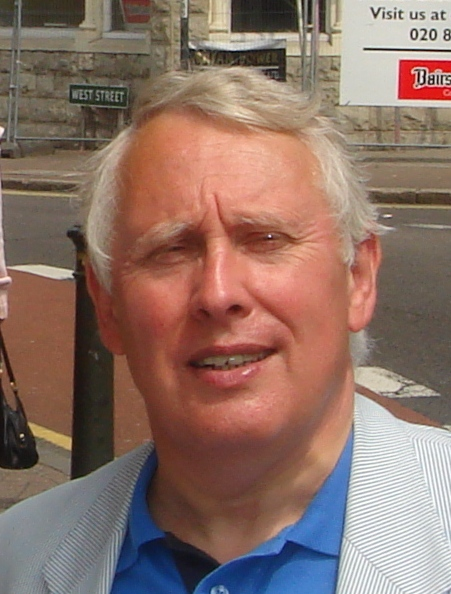

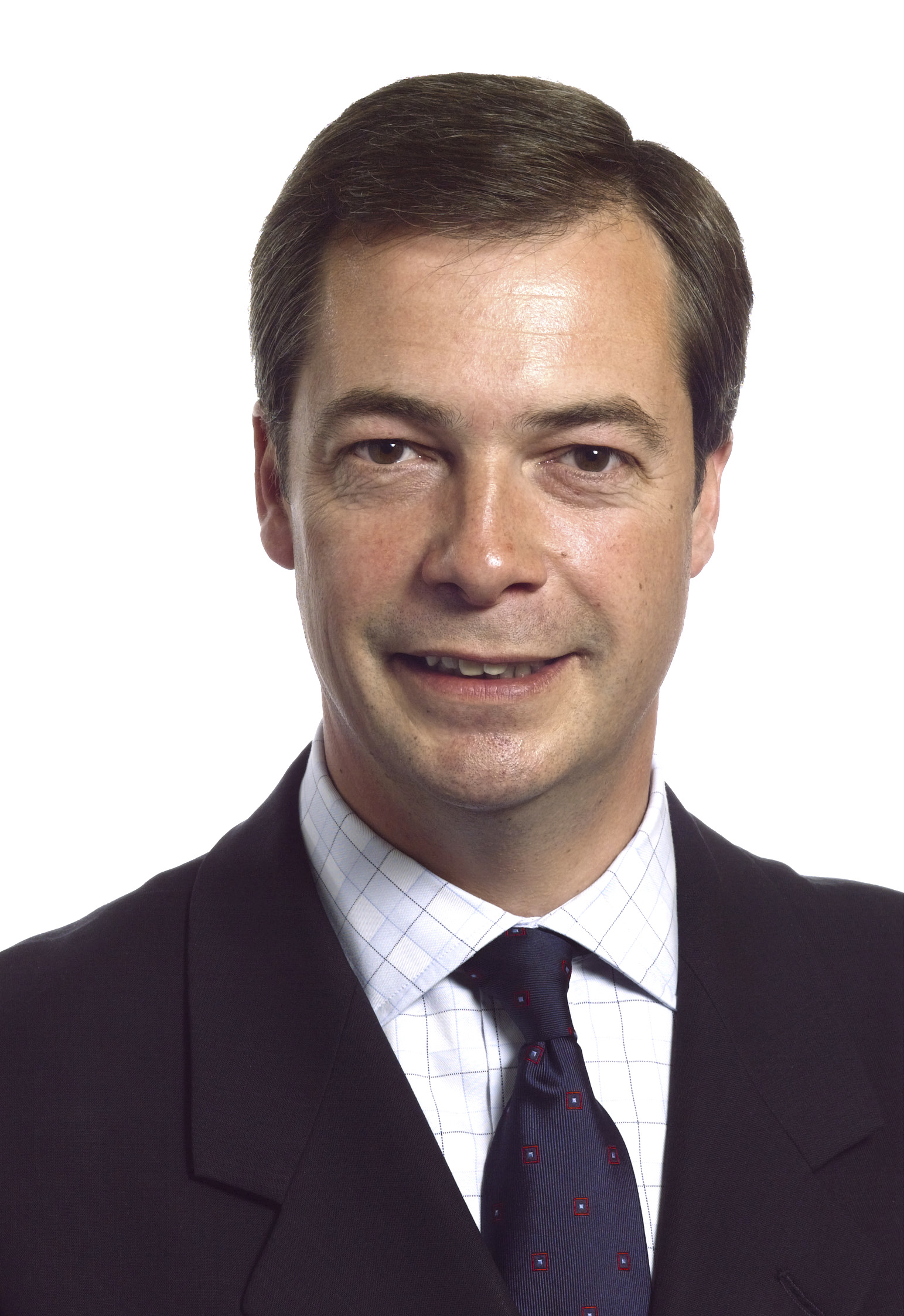

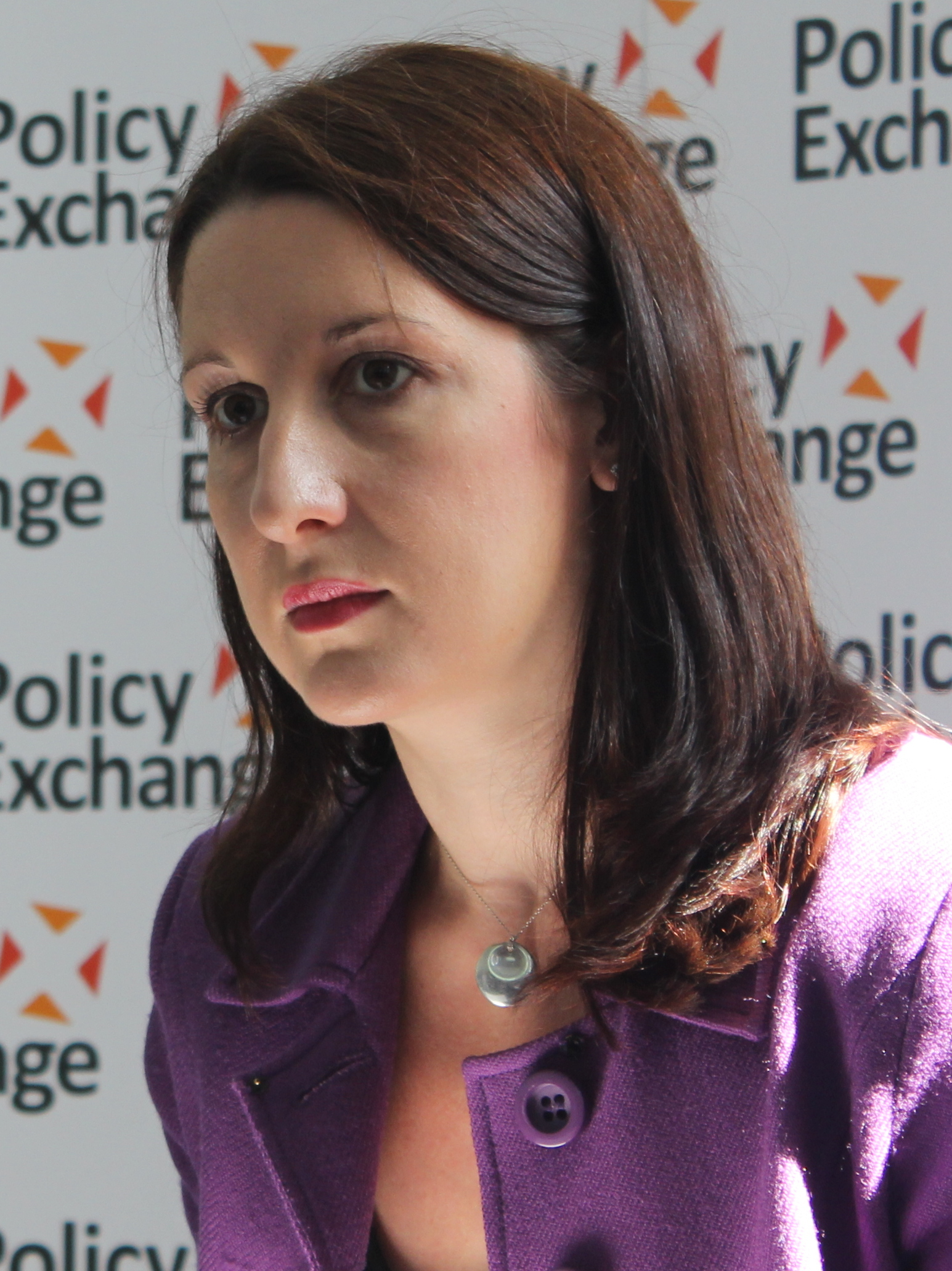
	First party	Second party
		Lib
Candidate	Bob Neill	Ben Abbotts
Party	Conservative	Liberal Democrats
Popular vote	11,621	10,988
Percentage	40.0%	37.8%
Swing	▼11.1%	▲17.5%
	Third party	Fourth party
Candidate	Nigel Farage	Rachel Reeves
Party	UKIP	Labour
Popular vote	2,347	1,925
Percentage	8.1%	6.6%
Swing	▲4.9%	▼15.6%
MP before election
Eric Forth
Conservative
Subsequent MP
Bob Neill
Conservative

A by-election for the United Kingdom parliamentary constituency of Bromley and Chislehurst was held on 29 June 2006, following the death of incumbent Conservative Member of Parliament (MP) Eric Forth. It was won by Bob Neill who held the seat for Conservatives, albeit narrowly; their majority was significantly reduced by Ben Abbotts of the Liberal Democrats.

The Labour Party candidate was future Chancellor of the Exchequer Rachel Reeves, who was pushed into fourth place by UKIP candidate and future Reform UK leader Nigel Farage. This was only the second time Labour had fallen to fourth place in an English by-election since World War II.

== Background and candidates ==
Sitting Conservative MP Eric Forth died on 17 May 2006. The writ to trigger a by-election in the seat was issued on 6 June.

On 3 June, the local Conservative Association selected Bob Neill, the London Assembly Member for Bexley and Bromley and leader of the Conservative group in the Assembly. The Liberal Democrats selected London Borough of Bromley councillor Ben Abbotts. He was the Liberal Democrat environment spokesman on Bromley Council. Labour chose Rachel Reeves, runner-up in 2005, to stand once again. The Green Party selected Ann Garrett as its candidate. Garrett stood as a Green Party candidate in the 2005 general election and the 2004 London Assembly elections. The UK Independence Party selected Nigel Farage MEP, who represents South East England in the European Parliament. The Official Monster Raving Loony Party selected John Cartwright.

Two independent candidates were validly nominated: John Hemming-Clark and Nick Hadziannis. The English Democrats selected Steven Uncles and candidates from the Money Reform Party and the National Front also ran. The Money Reform Party was a minor political party.

As per the Senior Electoral Officer of Bromley Council, the electorate for this by-election was 72,206, an increase of 1.50% from the 2005 election.

== Result ==
Bromley and Chislehurst by-election, 2006
Party	Candidate	Votes	%	±%
Conservative	Bob Neill	11,621	40.0	–11.1
Liberal Democrats	Ben Abbotts	10,988	37.8	+17.5
UKIP	Nigel Farage	2,347	8.1	+4.9
Labour	Rachel Reeves	1,925	6.6	–15.6
Green	Ann Garrett	811	2.8	–0.4
National Front	Paul Winnett	476	1.6	New
Independent	John Hemming-Clark	442	1.5	New
English Democrat	Steven Uncles	212	0.7	New
Monster Raving Loony	John Cartwright	132	0.5	New
Independent	Nick Hadziannis	65	0.2	New
Money Reform	Anne Belsey	33	0.1	New
Majority		633	2.2	–26.7
Turnout		29,012	40.2	–24.6
Registered electors		71,798		
Conservative hold		Swing	–13.8	

== Previous result ==
General election 2005: Bromley and Chislehurst
Party	Candidate	Votes	%	±%
Conservative	Eric Forth	23,583	51.1	+1.6
Labour	Rachel Reeves	10,241	22.2	–6.4
Liberal Democrats	Peter Brooks	9,368	20.3	+1.4
UKIP	David Hooper	1,475	3.2	+0.3
Green	Ann Garrett	1,470	3.2	New
Majority		13,342	28.9	+8.0
Turnout		46,137	64.8	+0.5
Registered electors		71,137		
Conservative hold		Swing	+4.0	

== See also ==
- Bromley and Chislehurst constituency
- Lists of United Kingdom by-elections
- London Borough of Bromley
