= Birmingham North (European Parliament constituency) =

Former European Parliament constituency

- European Parliament constituency
- Boundary within the West Midlands (1979-1984)
- Member state: United Kingdom
- Created: 1979
- Dissolved: 1984
- MEPs: 1

Prior to its uniform adoption of proportional representation in 1999, the United Kingdom used first-past-the-post for the European elections in England, Scotland and Wales. The European Parliament constituencies used under that system were smaller than the later regional constituencies and only had one Member of the European Parliament each.

The constituency of Birmingham North was one of them.

It consisted of the Westminster Parliament constituencies of Aldridge-Brownhills, Birmingham Erdington, Birmingham Perry Barr, Birmingham Stechford, Sutton Coldfield, Warley East, Warley West, West Bromwich East, and West Bromwich West.

== Members of the European Parliament ==
| Election | Name | Party | | |
|---|---|---|---|---|
| 1979 | Eric Forth | Conservative | 1984 | seat abolished |

== Results ==
European Parliament election, 1979: Birmingham North
| Party | Candidate | Votes | % | ±% |
|---|---|---|---|---|
| Conservative | Eric Forth | 68,507 | 47.8 | |
| Labour | P.M. Jackson | 60,163 | 42.0 | |
| Liberal | C.E.A. Hooper | 14,583 | 10.2 | |
| Majority | | 8,344 | 5.8 | |
| Turnout | | 143,253 | 26.6 | |
| Conservative win (new seat) | | | | |
