= Michael Rowbotham =

British political and economic writer

Michael Rowbotham is a political and economic writer and commentator based in the UK who is primarily known for his two books, The Grip of Death: A Study of Modern Money, Debt Slavery, and Destructive Economics (1998) and Goodbye America (2000).

== The Grip of Death ==
The Grip of Death: A Study of Modern Money, Debt Slavery, and Destructive Economics focuses on what he believes to be inequities in the practice of fractional-reserve banking (which he equates with counterfeiting) and the economic distortions he believes to be inherent in the so-called debt-based monetary system which almost all nations use in the modern age. In Goodbye America, Rowbotham argues that Third World debt is immoral, invalid, and inherently unrepayable.

== See also ==
- Criticism of fractional-reserve banking
- List of monetary reformers
- Monetary reform
- Soft currency
