= Eric Forth =

British politician (1944–2006)

The Right Honourable Eric Forth
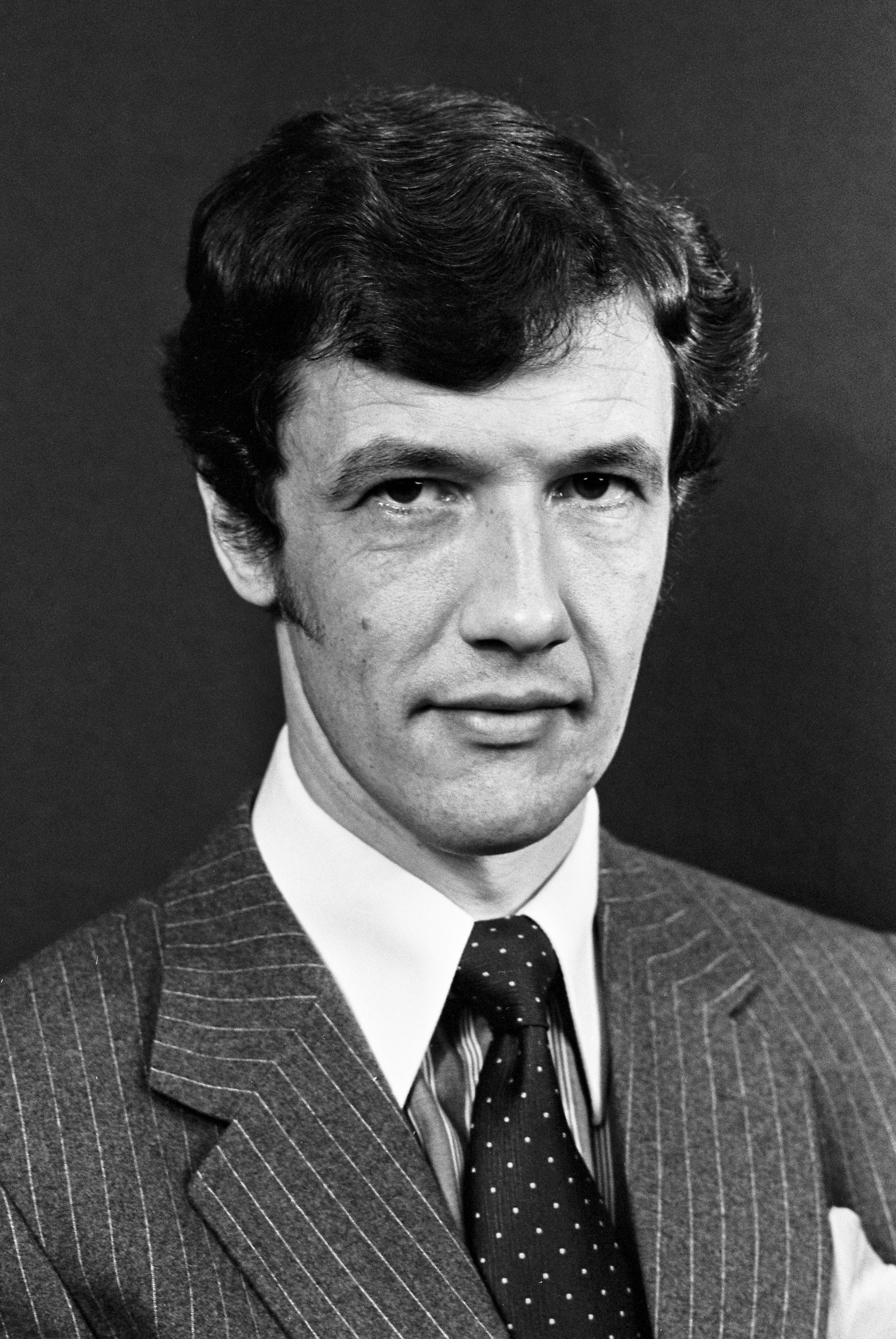
- Official portrait, c. 1979-1984

Shadow Leader of the House of Commons
- In office 18 September 2001 – 11 November 2003
- Leader: Iain Duncan Smith
- Preceded by: Angela Browning
- Succeeded by: Oliver Heald

Minister of State for Education
- In office 20 July 1994 – 2 May 1997
- Prime Minister: John Major
- Preceded by: The Baroness Blatch
- Succeeded by: Stephen Byers

Parliamentary Under-Secretary of State for Education
- In office 14 April 1992 – 20 July 1994
- Prime Minister: John Major
- Preceded by: Robert Key; Tim Yeo
- Succeeded by: Robin Squire

Parliamentary Under-Secretary of State for Employment
- In office 28 November 1990 – 14 April 1992
- Prime Minister: John Major
- Preceded by: Michael Fallon; Alan Howarth
- Succeeded by: Patrick McLoughlin

Member of Parliament for Bromley and Chislehurst
- In office 1 May 1997 – 17 May 2006
- Preceded by: Constituency established
- Succeeded by: Bob Neill

Member of Parliament for Mid Worcestershire
- In office 9 June 1983 – 8 April 1997
- Preceded by: Constituency established
- Succeeded by: Peter Luff

Member of the European Parliament for Birmingham North
- In office 7 June 1979 – 14 June 1984
- Preceded by: Constituency established
- Succeeded by: Constituency abolished

Personal details
- Born: 9 September 1944 Glasgow, Scotland
- Died: 17 May 2006 (aged 61) London, England
- Party: Conservative
- Spouses: Linda St Clair (m. 1967; div. 1994) Carroll Forth (m. 1994)
- Children: 2 (by St Clair)
- Education: Jordanhill College School, University of Glasgow

Eric Forth (9 September 1944 – 17 May 2006) was a British Conservative politician. He served as Member of the European Parliament (MEP) for Birmingham North from 1979 to 1984. He then served as Member of Parliament (MP) for Mid Worcestershire from 1983 to 1997. Finally, he served as MP for Bromley and Chislehurst from 1997 until his death in 2006.

Forth served as a junior minister in the governments of Margaret Thatcher and John Major between 1988 and 1997. In his obituaries, he was described as "colourful", "flamboyant", "provocative" and a "right-wing libertarian". He was noted for his colourful ties and waistcoats.

== Early and private life ==
Forth was born in Glasgow. His father was a harbourmaster. He was educated at the Jordanhill College School and the University of Glasgow, where he was awarded a master's degree in politics and economics. Before entering politics, he worked in junior managerial roles at Xerox, Rank and Ford Motor Company before becoming a management consultant with Deloitte and Dexion.

== Political career ==
After standing as a communist at a mock school-election and flirting with distributism at university, Forth developed both conservative and libertarian leanings. Forth was elected as a councillor for the Pilgrims Hatch ward on the Brentwood Urban District Council from 1968 to 1972. He contested the safe Labour seat of Barking at both the February and October 1974 general elections, where on both occasions he was defeated by Labour's Jo Richardson. He was the secretary of Llandeilo Conservative Association from 1975 to 1977, and chairman of the Ross-on-Wye Conservative Political Committee from 1978 to 1979.

He was elected to the European Parliament as the member for Birmingham North in 1979. He remained in Brussels and Strasbourg until 1984, where he founded and chaired the backbench committee of the European Democratic Group. Originally in favour of membership of the European Economic Community, he later became a staunch Eurosceptic.

He was elected to the House of Commons at the 1983 general election with a majority of 14,205 votes for the new seat of Mid-Worcestershire. His political views were apparent from his maiden speech, in which he attacked the Sex Equality Bill, and he was an early member of the No Turning Back group. Following boundary changes to his constituency, he was not selected to fight the new seat with the same name, losing out to the sitting MP for Worcester, Peter Luff. Forth found a safe seat in the Outer London suburbs for Bromley and Chislehurst in the heart of the large London Borough of Bromley. He was elected to represent the seat in 1997, 2001 and 2005.

In Parliament, he served on the Employment select committee in 1986 until later in the year when he was appointed as the Parliamentary private secretary to Angela Rumbold at the Department for Education and Science.

He entered the government of Margaret Thatcher when she appointed him as the Parliamentary under-secretary of state at the Department of Trade and Industry in 1988, as minister for consumer affairs. He was moved by John Major in 1990 to the same position at the Department for Employment and at the Department of Education following the 1992 general election. He was promoted to Minister of State for Education in 1994 and became a member of the Privy Council in 1996, shortly before leaving office in 1997.

== The awkward squad ==
Forth had hoped to support Michael Portillo for the leadership of the Conservative Party, to follow Major, but Portillo famously lost his seat in the 1997 general election. Forth was then Peter Lilley's campaign manager until the latter withdrew, then supported John Redwood, and finally backed eventual winner William Hague. Forth refused the offer of a place in the Conservative shadow ministerial team and instead became a leading backbench irritant to the Labour government, engaging in "a Parliamentary form of guerrilla warfare". Initially acting as a loner and concentrating on private members bills to which he objected, Forth soon gathered a small group around him known as "the awkward squad".

In 1997, with senior Conservative MPs David Maclean and Patrick McLoughlin, he established the Policy Research Unit, a subscription briefing service available to any MP as a means of countering the briefings that government ministers receive from the civil service.

Disliking e-mail, he would send brief written notes to like-minded MPs to say "I am given to understand that the Powers That Be think that Wednesday's business will go through easily", and his group would ensure that Wednesday's business did not go through easily. Forth's speciality was the filibuster: as Labour MPs found themselves often required to remain in Parliament past midnight, they called him "Bloody Eric Forth" (a reaction Forth welcomed). Iain Duncan Smith appointed Forth Shadow Leader of the House of Commons in 2001. Forth backed David Davis to replace Duncan Smith in 2003: Davis refused to stand, and Forth was dismissed from his front-bench position by Michael Howard. He served on many Parliamentary committees and his last role was chairing the statutory instruments committee. He was a member of the speaker's Panel of Chairmen.

Forth was in favour of capital punishment, but opposed corporal punishment in schools. After William Hague announced his support for an "election compact" promoted by the Commission for Racial Equality in 2001, Forth was quoted as saying at a private dinner: "All this sucking up to minorities is ridiculous; there are millions of people in this country who are white, Anglo-Saxon and bigoted and they need to be represented." He opposed the BBC's spending money on a Nelson Mandela concert in 1988, saying "those who want the arts and who support them should pay for them themselves". He also opposed the government spending on AIDS treatment, saying that the disease was "largely self-inflicted". He was a fan of Elvis Presley and treasurer of the all-party Music Appreciation Group, and a couple of Presley's songs were played at Forth's memorial service in October 2006.

== Personal life ==
Forth was married to Linda St. Clair on 11 March 1967 and they had two daughters before their divorce in 1994; he remarried later that year to Carroll Goff, gaining a stepson. Forth died from cancer at Charing Cross Hospital on 17 May 2006, at the age of 61.

== Publications ==
- Regional Policy: A Fringe Benefit? by Eric Forth, 1983, Conservative Central Office, CCO508912

== Sources ==
- Obituary The Times, 19 May 2006
- Obituary The Daily Telegraph, 19 May 2006
- Obituary The Guardian, 19 May 2006
- Obituary The Independent, 21 May 2006

Parliament of the United Kingdom
New constituency	Member of Parliament for Mid Worcestershire; 1983–1997	Succeeded by Peter Luff
New constituency	Member of Parliament for Bromley and Chislehurst; 1997–2006	Succeeded by Bob Neill
