= Bromley and Chislehurst =

UK Parliament constituency (1997–2024)

Coordinates: 51.3984°N 0.0450°E

- Former borough constituency for the House of Commons
- Boundary of Bromley and Chislehurst in Greater London
- County: Greater London
- Population: 88,633 (2011 census)
- Electorate: 65,508 (December 2010)
- Borough: London Borough of Bromley

1997–2024
- Seats: One
- Created from: Ravensbourne, Chislehurst
- Replaced by: Bromley and Biggin Hill, Eltham and Chislehurst

Bromley and Chislehurst was a constituency in Greater London represented in the House of Commons of the UK Parliament from 2006 until its abolition for the 2024 general election by Bob Neill, a Conservative. (Note: As with all constituencies, the constituency elects one Member of Parliament (MP) by the first past the post system of election at least every five years.)

== Constituency profile ==
The Bromley and Chislehurst constituency is relatively prosperous in terms of income and has low unemployment; it is largely suburban with significant parkland and sports areas. Most of the housing is owner-occupied although there are significant proportions of social housing in parts of Mottingham and Bromley Common. The 2011 census shows that the borough is 84.3% White European/British, lower than the national average (86%) and higher than then London average (59%).

Until 2006 it was one of the Conservative Party's safest seats; the by-election of that year saw the party's electoral majority fall steeply from over 13,000 (in the 2005 election) to just over 600 votes. The party has since rebuilt its majority, which currently stands at just under 11,000.

== History ==
The Bromley parliamentary constituency was created in 1918. (Note: Before 1918 the area was part of the larger Sevenoaks constituency) In 1974 Bromley became Ravensbourne.

Before the 1997 election western wards of Chislehurst merged with eastern wards in Ravensbourne to form Bromley and Chislehurst. (Note: Outlying parts of predecessor constituencies joined Beckenham, Lewisham West and Penge and Orpington)

=== Bromley/Ravensbourne/Chislehurst summary ===
The earlier Bromley seat, later Ravensbourne, was markedly prosperous in regional terms and did not elect Labour Members of Parliament (MPs) during its 1918 to 1974 existence. However, one of the Ravensbourne wards, Plaistow and Sundridge, had a communist councillor in the 1940s. Prime Minister (1957–1963) Harold Macmillan was the MP for Bromley from 1945 until his retirement in 1964, when he was succeeded by John Hunt. Hunt, on the left of the Conservative Party, held the seat (renamed Ravensbourne in 1974) until 1997.

The Chislehurst seat was somewhat marginal, and returned Labour Party MPs in their landslide victories in 1945 and 1966, though returned increasingly safer majorities for the Conservatives throughout the 1980s onwards.

A by-election was held on 29 June 2006, upon the death of the previous MP Eric Forth the month before, which returned London Assembly member Bob Neill as the new Conservative MP with an electoral majority of just over 600 votes – compared to the previous Conservative majority of over 13,000 in the 2005 general election. Turnout was down by a significant margin. In 2010 Bob Neill was re-elected with a Conservative majority greater than that achieved in 2005.

== Boundaries ==
1997–2010: The London Borough of Bromley wards of Bickley, Bromley Common and Keston, Chislehurst, Hayes, Martins Hill and Town, Mottingham, and Plaistow and Sundridge.

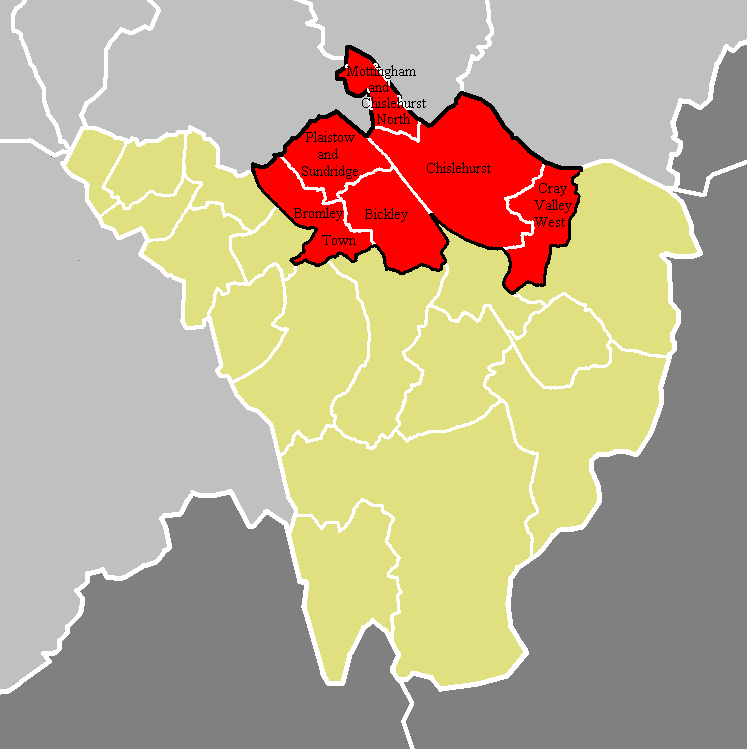
The wards and boundaries for the Bromley and Chislehurst Parliament constituency (red) as first used in the 2010 general election, shown within the London Borough of Bromley (yellow)

2010–2024: The London Borough of Bromley wards of Bickley, Bromley Town, Chislehurst, Cray Valley West, Mottingham and Chislehurst North, and Plaistow and Sundridge.

Bromley and Chislehurst constituency covered the northern part of the London Borough of Bromley including the east of Bromley, its town centre, and Chislehurst.

=== Abolition ===
Further to the completion of the 2023 Periodic Review of Westminster constituencies, the seat was abolished for the 2024 general election, with its contents distributed three ways:

- The majority of the electorate, comprising Bickley, Bromley, Plaistow and Sundridge, to form the basis of the new constituency of Bromley and Biggin Hill
- Chislehurst and Mottingham to be included in the new constituency of Eltham and Chislehurst
- The Cray Valley West ward (St Paul's Cray) to be reunited with Cray Valley East (St Mary's Cray) in the Orpington constituency

== Members of Parliament ==
Election	Member	Party
1997	Eric Forth	Conservative
2006 by-election	Bob Neill	Conservative

== Election results ==
=== Elections in the 2010s ===
General election 2019: Bromley and Chislehurst
Party	Candidate	Votes	%	±%
Conservative	Bob Neill	23,958	52.6	−1.4
Labour	Angela Wilkins	13,067	28.7	−4.7
Liberal Democrats	Julie Ireland	6,621	14.5	+7.3
Green	Mary Ion	1,546	3.4	+0.9
CPA	Zion Amodu	255	0.6	New
Renew	Jyoti Dialani	119	0.3	New
Majority		10,891	23.9	+3.3
Turnout		45,566	68.3	−3.4
Registered electors		66,711		
Conservative hold		Swing	+1.7	

General election 2017: Bromley and Chislehurst
Party	Candidate	Votes	%	±%
Conservative	Bob Neill	25,175	54.0	+1.0
Labour	Sara Hyde	15,585	33.4	+11.2
Liberal Democrats	Sam Webber	3,369	7.2	+0.8
UKIP	Emmett Jenner	1,383	3.0	−11.3
Green	Roisin Robertson	1,150	2.5	−1.6
Majority		9,590	20.6	−10.2
Turnout		46,662	71.7	+3.3
Registered electors		65,117		
Conservative hold		Swing	−5.1	

General election 2015: Bromley and Chislehurst
Party	Candidate	Votes	%	±%
Conservative	Bob Neill	23,343	53.0	−0.5
Labour	John Courtneidge	9,779	22.2	+5.6
UKIP	Emmett Jenner	6,285	14.3	+11.0
Liberal Democrats	Sam Webber	2,836	6.4	−15.6
Green	Roisin Robertson	1,823	4.1	+2.6
Majority		13,564	30.8	−0.8
Turnout		44,066	68.4	+1.1
Registered electors		65,477		
Conservative hold		Swing	−3.0	

General election 2010: Bromley and Chislehurst
Party	Candidate	Votes	%	±%
Conservative	Bob Neill	23,569	53.5	
Liberal Democrats	Sam Webber	9,669	22.0	
Labour	Chris Kirby	7,295	16.6	
UKIP	Emmett Jenner	1,451	3.3	
BNP	Rowena Savage	1,070	2.4	
Green	Roisin Robertson	607	1.5	
English Democrat	Jon Cheeseman	376	0.9	
Majority		13,900	31.6	
Turnout		44,037	67.3	
Conservative hold		Swing		

=== Elections in the 2000s ===
2006 Bromley and Chislehurst by-election
Party	Candidate	Votes	%	±%
Conservative	Bob Neill	11,621	40.1	−11.0
Liberal Democrats	Ben Abbotts	10,988	37.9	+17.6
UKIP	Nigel Farage	2,307	8.0	+4.8
Labour	Rachel Reeves	1,925	6.6	−15.6
Green	Ann Garrett	811	2.8	−0.4
National Front	Paul Winnett	476	1.6	New
Independent	John Hemming-Clark	442	1.5	New
English Democrat	Steven Uncles	212	0.7	New
Monster Raving Loony	John Cartwright	132	0.5	New
Independent	Nick Hadziannis	65	0.2	New
Money Reform	Anne Belsey	33	0.1	New
Majority		633	2.2	−26.7
Turnout		29,012	40.2	−24.6
Registered electors		71,798		
Conservative hold		Swing	−13.8	

General election 2005: Bromley and Chislehurst
Party	Candidate	Votes	%	±%
Conservative	Eric Forth	23,583	51.1	+1.6
Labour	Rachel Reeves	10,241	22.2	−6.4
Liberal Democrats	Peter Brooks	9,368	20.3	+1.4
UKIP	David Hooper	1,475	3.2	+0.3
Green	Ann Garrett	1,470	3.2	New
Majority		13,342	28.9	+8.0
Turnout		46,137	64.8	+0.5
Registered electors		71,137		
Conservative hold		Swing	+4.0	

General election 2001: Bromley and Chislehurst
Party	Candidate	Votes	%	±%
Conservative	Eric Forth	21,412	49.5	+3.2
Labour	Sue Polydorou	12,375	28.6	+3.4
Liberal Democrats	Geoff Payne	8,180	18.9	−4.9
UKIP	Rob Bryant	1,264	2.9	+0.7
Majority		9,037	20.9	−0.2
Turnout		43,231	64.3	−9.8
Registered electors		67,183		
Conservative hold		Swing	−0.1	

=== Elections in the 1990s ===
General election 1997: Bromley and Chislehurst
Party	Candidate	Votes	%	±%
Conservative	Eric Forth	24,428	46.3	
Labour	Rob Yeldham	13,310	25.2	
Liberal Democrats	Paul Booth	12,530	23.8	
UKIP	Rob Bryant	1,176	2.2	
Green	Frances Speed	640	1.2	
National Front	Michael Stoneman	369	0.7	
Liberal	Gabriel Aitman	285	0.5	
Majority		11,118	21.1	
Turnout		52,738	74.1	
Conservative win (new seat)				

== See also ==
- List of parliamentary constituencies in London
