= Economic Affairs Committee (House of Lords) =

The Economic Affairs Committee is a select committee of the House of Lords in the Parliament of the United Kingdom. It has a broad remit "to consider economic affairs and business affairs".

== Chairs ==
Committee chairs include those listed below.

| Name | Start | End | Party |
|---|---|---|---|
| The Lord MacGregor of Pulham Market | 22 June 2010 | 14 May 2014 | Conservative |
| The Lord Hollick | 12 June 2014 | 27 April 2017 | Labour |
| The Lord Forsyth of Drumlean | 27 June 2017 | 19 January 2022 | Conservative |
| The Lord Bridges of Headley | 19 January 2022 | 30 January 2025 | Conservative |
| The Lord Wood of Anfield | 30 January 2025 | 21 July 2026 | Labour |
| The Lord Liddle | 7 September 2026 | present | Labour |

== Membership ==
As of September 2026, the membership of the committee is as follows:

| Member | Party |
|---|---|
| Lord Liddle(Chair) | Labour |
| Baroness Alexander of Cleveden | Labour |
| Lord Burns | Crossbench |
| Lord Butler of Brockwell | Crossbench |
| Lord Carrington of Fulham | Conservative |
| Lord Newby | Liberal Democrat |
| Baroness Penn | Conservative |
| Lord Petitgas | Conservative |
| Lord Prentis of Leeds | Labour |
| Lord Razzall | Liberal Democrat |
| Lord Reid of Cardowan | Labour |
| Baroness Wheatcroft | Crossbench |
| Baroness Wolf of Dulwich | Crossbench |
| Lord Young of Cookham | Conservative |

== Sub-committee ==
The Finance Bill Sub-Committee is a sub-committee of the Economic Affairs Committee. It was first appointed in September 2018 and has a remit to consider the Finance Bill.

=== Membership ===
As of September 2026, the members of the committee are:

| Member | Party |
|---|---|
| Lord Liddle(Chair) | Labour |
| Baroness Bi | Labour |
| Lord Carrington of Fulham | Conservative |
| Lord Leigh of Hurley | Conservative |
| Lord Newby | Liberal Democrat |
| Baroness Wheatcroft | Crossbench |
