= 1917 Fulham by-election =

UK Parliamentary by-election

The 1917 Fulham by-election was held on 3 July 1917. The ministerial by-election was held due to the incumbent Conservative MP, William Hayes Fisher, becoming President of the Local Government Board. It was retained by Fisher who was unopposed.
