= Greg Hands =

British politician (born 1965)

The Right Honourable Sir Greg Hands
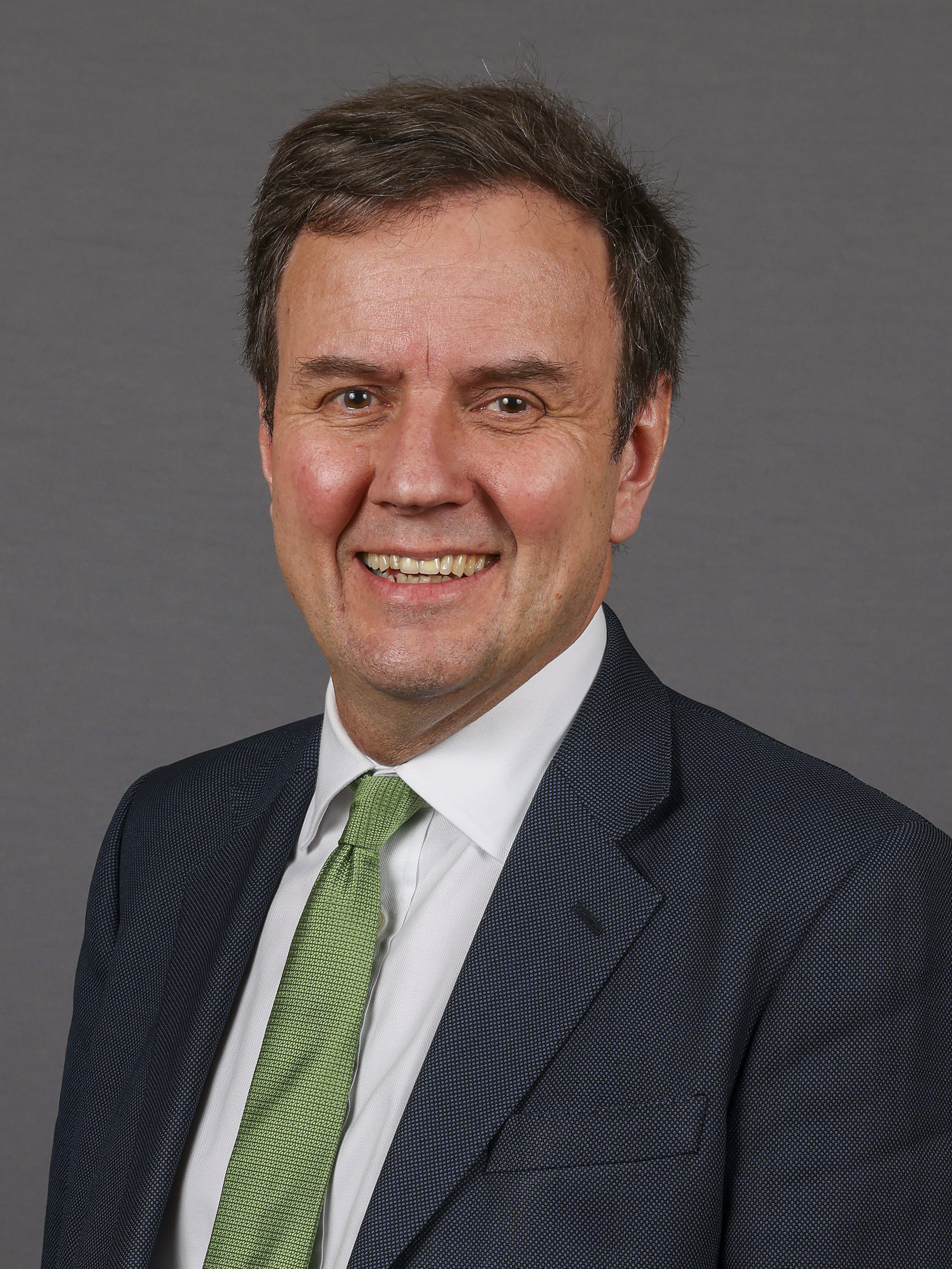
- Official portrait, 2023

Minister of State for Trade Policy
- In office 13 November 2023 – 5 July 2024
- Prime Minister: Rishi Sunak
- Preceded by: Himself
- Succeeded by: Douglas Alexander
- In office 9 October 2022 – 7 February 2023
- Prime Minister: Liz Truss; Rishi Sunak
- Preceded by: Conor Burns
- Succeeded by: Himself
- In office 13 February 2020 – 15 September 2021
- Prime Minister: Boris Johnson
- Preceded by: Conor Burns
- Succeeded by: Penny Mordaunt
- In office 15 July 2016 – 21 June 2018
- Prime Minister: Theresa May
- Preceded by: Office established
- Succeeded by: George Hollingbery

Minister for London
- In office 13 November 2023 – 5 July 2024
- Prime Minister: Rishi Sunak
- Preceded by: Paul Scully
- In office 13 June 2017 – 9 January 2018
- Prime Minister: Theresa May
- Preceded by: Gavin Barwell
- Succeeded by: Jo Johnson
Cabinet-level offices
Chairman of the Conservative Party Minister without Portfolio
In office 7 February 2023 – 13 November 2023
Leader	Rishi Sunak
Preceded by	Nadhim Zahawi
Succeeded by	Richard Holden
Chief Secretary to the Treasury
In office 11 May 2015 – 14 July 2016
Prime Minister	David Cameron
Chancellor	George Osborne
Preceded by	Danny Alexander
Succeeded by	David Gauke
Junior ministerial offices
Minister of State for Business, Energy and Clean Growth
In office 16 September 2021 – 6 September 2022
Prime Minister	Boris Johnson
Preceded by	Anne-Marie Trevelyan
Succeeded by	Graham Stuart
Government Deputy Chief Whip in the House of Commons Treasurer of the Household
In office 7 October 2013 – 11 May 2015
Prime Minister	David Cameron
Preceded by	John Randall
Succeeded by	Anne Milton

Member of Parliament for Chelsea and Fulham Hammersmith and Fulham (2005–2010)
- In office 5 May 2005 – 30 May 2024
- Preceded by: Iain Coleman
- Succeeded by: Ben Coleman

Personal details
- Born: Gregory William Hands; 14 November 1965 (age 60) New York City, New York, U.S.
- Citizenship: British; American
- Party: Conservative
- Spouse: Irina Hundt (m. 2005; div. 2026)
- Children: 2
- Education: Robinson College, Cambridge (BA)

Sir Gregory William Hands (born 14 November 1965) is a British politician who served as Minister for London and Minister of State for Trade Policy from November 2023 to July 2024. He was the Member of Parliament (MP) for Chelsea and Fulham, previously Hammersmith and Fulham, from 2005 to 2024. A member of the Conservative Party, he served as its Chairman from February to November 2023. Hands has served as Minister of State for Trade Policy under four prime ministers, holding the office on four occasions, ranging from 2016 to 2024, and also served as Minister of State for Business, Energy and Clean Growth from 2021 to 2022.

Hands was the MP for Chelsea and Fulham from 2010 to 2024; the constituency was created that year by the splitting of the former constituencies of Kensington and Chelsea and Hammersmith and Fulham. Prior to these boundary changes, he served as the MP for the Hammersmith and Fulham constituency from 2005.

Hands served in Prime Minister David Cameron's Cabinet as Chief Secretary to the Treasury from 2015 until 2016. He voted for the UK to remain in the European Union during the 2016 Brexit referendum. Following the referendum vote and Cameron's consequent resignation, Hands was demoted by the new prime minister Theresa May to a junior ministerial position at the Department for International Trade. Following the snap 2017 general election, Hands retained his position as Minister of State for Trade and Investment but also undertook the Minister for London role, replacing Gavin Barwell who lost his seat. Hands resigned in 2018, citing his opposition to the proposed expansion of Heathrow Airport, but returned to the position as Minister of State for Trade Policy in February 2020 under Prime Minister Boris Johnson.

In September 2021, Hands was appointed Minister of State for Business, Energy and Clean Growth. Following Johnson's resignation on 6 September 2022, Hands left that position and briefly returned to the backbenches before being appointed to his former role as Minister of State for Trade Policy by Prime Minister Liz Truss on 9 October 2022. Following Truss's resignation, he was retained as Trade Minister by new prime minister Rishi Sunak. Following the dismissal of Nadhim Zahawi in January 2023, Hands was promoted to Chairman of the Conservative Party by Sunak on 7 February 2023, but was sacked from this role on 13 November 2023. The same day, he was appointed to the role of Minister of State for Trade Policy. He was appointed Minister for London for a second time a day later.

In the 2024 United Kingdom general election, he was unseated by Ben Coleman from the Labour Party.

== Early life and career ==
Gregory Hands was born on 14 November 1965 to British parents in New York City. He lived in the United States until he was seven years old and his family moved back to the UK. He was educated at state schools in England, and completed his secondary education at Dr Challoner's Grammar School, Amersham in 1984.

During his gap year Hands worked in a swimming pool in Berlin where he gained the nickname “Tapper”; he became interested in the Eastern Bloc, visiting Prague and other Eastern European cities on future holidays.

He went on to attend Robinson College, Cambridge, where he graduated with a first in Modern History in 1989. He joined the Conservative Party as a student, served as the chairman of the Cambridge University Conservative Association, and was on the executive committee of the Cambridge University Students' Union.

Hands spent eight years after university in banking. He worked on trading floors in derivatives at the City of London and New York City until 1997.

== Political career ==
Hands was elected as a councillor in the London Borough of Hammersmith and Fulham in 1998. He became the leader of the Conservative group in 1999, remaining in that capacity until 2003.

=== In opposition ===
At the 2005 general election, Hands was elected to Parliament as MP for Hammersmith and Fulham, winning with 45.4% of the vote and a majority of 5,029.

In his maiden speech on 26 May 2005, Hands referred to the fact that the BBC was the largest employer in his constituency and that Hammersmith Broadway was the busiest road interchange in Europe.

Hands quickly became interested in the subject of MPs expenses, causing the whips to attempt to dissuade him.

In 2007, Hands was selected to be the Conservative candidate for the new Chelsea and Fulham parliamentary constituency. His previous seat of Hammersmith and Fulham was abolished for the 2010 general election, with Hammersmith having its own seat (being fought by Shaun Bailey for the Conservatives), and Fulham joining Chelsea in a new seat. In January 2009, Hands was appointed to the Conservative front bench team as a shadow Treasury minister. He also became the Parliamentary chairman of Conservative Friends of Poland.

=== In government ===
==== Cameron–Clegg coalition ====
At the 2010 general election, Hands was elected as MP for the newly created constituency of Chelsea and Fulham, winning with 60.5% of the vote and a majority of 16,722. After the election, Hands served as Parliamentary Private Secretary to the chancellor of the exchequer George Osborne, having shadowed the Treasury in opposition.

On 14 October 2011, Hands was appointed as an assistant government whip in the House of Commons as a consequence of the mini-reshuffle following the resignation of Liam Fox as Secretary of State for Defence.

In 2013, Hands voted in favour of legalising same-sex marriage in England and Wales.

Hands was appointed Government Deputy Chief Whip and Treasurer of the Household in October 2013. In March 2014, he was sworn as a Privy Counsellor, entitling him to the style "The Right Honourable" for life.

==== Majority Cameron government ====
At the 2015 general election, Hands was re-elected as MP as Chelsea and Fulham with an increased vote share of 62.9% and a decreased majority of 16,022. Following the election, Hands was promoted by David Cameron to the Cabinet in the position of Chief Secretary to the Treasury.

Hands campaigned for the UK to remain in the European Union in the 2016 Brexit referendum. In the lead-up to the referendum, Hands led the Chelsea and Fulham Britain Stronger in Europe campaign. During the campaign, Hands issued warnings of the consequences for the UK should it leave the European Union, saying that the country would face "profound consequences" including "fewer jobs, higher prices in our shops and less money for our public services like the NHS". A strong advocate of international trade, he described the European Union's Single Market as being the "most complete commitment to free trade that exists".

==== May government ====
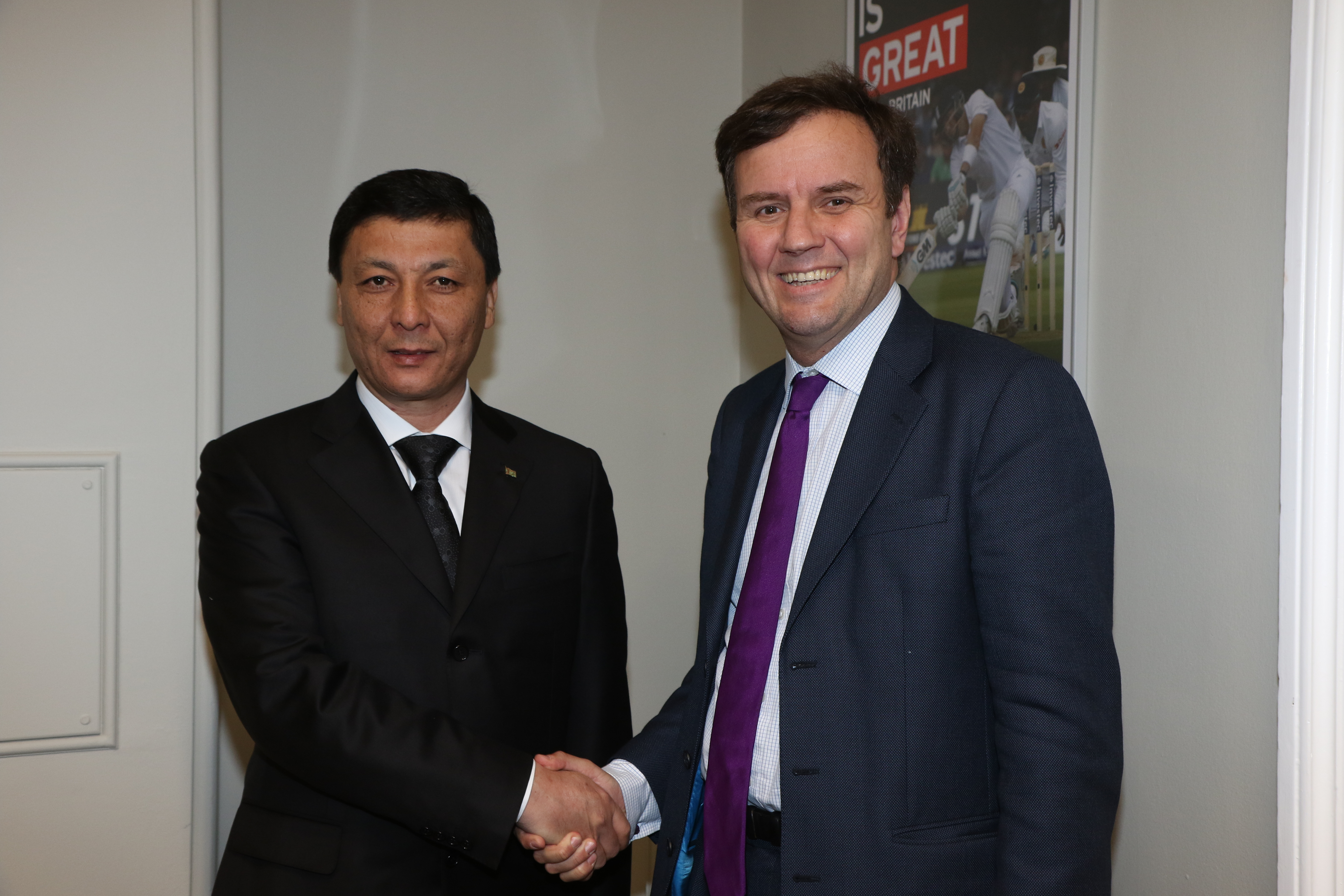
Hands meeting Turkmenistani Minister of Finance and Economy Batyr Bazarov in London on 22 January 2018

In the 2016 reshuffle following the EU referendum and Theresa May's appointment as prime minister, he was made Minister of State for Trade Policy at the newly formed Department for International Trade.

Following the referendum, Hands argued that the UK should leave the European Union with a deal. To justify his changed position regarding the UK outside of the European Union, Hands argued that in "the long term" the UK could "independently conclude better contracts with third countries". Hands voted against the Withdrawal Agreement in the first Meaningful Vote, but voted in favour of it in the second and third meaningful votes, stating that the deal had been improved.

At the snap 2017 general election, Hands was again re-elected, with a decreased vote share of 52.6% and a decreased majority of 8,188.

Following the Grenfell Tower fire which killed 71 people, Hands called for the Notting Hill Carnival to be moved. He said, "We have to ask ourselves if it is appropriate to stage a Carnival in the near proximity of a major national disaster." The mayor of London, Sadiq Khan, dismissed Hands' proposal.

On 21 June 2018, Hands resigned his ministerial post to vote against a third runway at Heathrow Airport.

Following the third defeat of the Brexit withdrawal agreement in the House of Commons in March 2019, Hands co-chaired the Prosperity UK Alternative Arrangements Commission. This body looked at alternatives to the Irish backstop.

Alongside former neighbouring MPs Justine Greening and Zac Goldsmith, Hands has been critical of the London Borough of Hammersmith and Fulham's April 2019 decision to close Hammersmith Bridge to motor vehicles, and has called for the bridge to be promptly repaired and re-opened.

During the 2019 Conservative leadership election, Hands was one of the first MPs to declare their support for Jeremy Hunt. During the campaign, Hands wrote to Boris Johnson requesting that he review the Government's decision to build a third runway at Heathrow Airport. Hunt ultimately lost the contest to Johnson in the final round.

==== Johnson government ====
Hands was again re-elected at the 2019 general election, with a decreased vote share of 49.9% and an increased majority of 11,241.

Hands was appointed Minister of State for Trade Policy in the second Johnson ministry during the 2020 cabinet reshuffle.

In May 2020, Parliament's Standards and Privileges Committee censured Hands for misusing public funds relating to stationery and pre-paid House of Commons envelopes. In November 2021, Hands followed his party three line whip to vote to overhaul the Standards and Privileges Committee.

==== Truss government ====
Hands was appointed Minister of State for Trade Policy on 9 October 2022.

==== Sunak government ====
Following the firing of Nadhim Zahawi in January 2023, Hands was appointed as his replacement as Chairman of the Conservative Party in a subsequent cabinet reshuffle. As chairman, Hands was responsible for party administration and the organisation of the Conservative Campaign Headquarters. In the November 2023 British cabinet reshuffle, Hands was replaced as Conservative Party chairman, and Hands returned to the role of Minister of State for Trade Policy. Returning to his previous brief, he joked, "I even kept my business cards from last time." Hands was made Minister of London as well.

=== Post-parliamentary career ===
In May 2025, Hands was appointed an advisor to EP Group, owned by Daniel Křetínský, which owns the Royal Mail. Hands was also appointed as a Strategic Adviser for Energetický a průmyslový holding, an energy company based in Prague, Czech Republic.

== Personal life ==
Hands has dual American/British nationality. He lives in Fulham with his son and daughter. Hands says that he speaks five European languages, including German and Czech.

During the COVID-19 pandemic, his father, Edward, died with COVID-19 in a UK care home.

Hands supports Plymouth Argyle and has appeared as a guest at supporters' association events.

Parliament of the United Kingdom
Preceded by Iain Coleman	Member of Parliament for Hammersmith and Fulham; 2005–2010	Constituency abolished
New constituency	Member of Parliament for Chelsea and Fulham; 2010–2024	Succeeded by Ben Coleman
Political offices
Preceded by John Randall	Deputy Chief Whip of the House of Commons; 2013–2015	Succeeded by Anne Milton
Preceded by John Randall	Treasurer of the Household; 2013–2015	Succeeded by Anne Milton
Preceded by Danny Alexander	Chief Secretary to the Treasury; 2015–2016	Succeeded by David Gauke
Office established	Minister of State for Trade Policy; 2016–2018	Succeeded by George Hollingbery
Preceded by Gavin Barwell	Minister for London; 2017–2018	Succeeded by Jo Johnson
Preceded by Conor Burns	Minister of State for Trade Policy; 2020–2021	Succeeded by Penny Mordaunt
Preceded by Anne-Marie Trevelyan	Minister of State for Business, Energy and Clean Growth; 2021–2022	Succeeded by Graham Stuart as Minister of State for Climate
Preceded by Conor Burns	Minister of State for Trade Policy; 2022–2023	Vacant Title next held by Himself
Preceded by Nadhim Zahawi	Minister without Portfolio; 2023	Succeeded by Richard Holden
Vacant Title last held by Himself	Minister of State for Trade Policy; 2023-2024	Succeeded by Douglas Alexander
Preceded by Paul Scully	Minister for London; 2023–2024	Vacant
Party political offices
Preceded by John Randall	Conservative Deputy Chief Whip of the House of Commons; 2013–2015	Succeeded by Anne Milton
Preceded by Nadhim Zahawi	Chairman of the Conservative Party; 2023	Succeeded by Richard Holden
