= Neale Coleman =

British Labour politician

Neale Coleman CBE

Director of Policy of the Labour Party
- Preceded by: Torsten Bell
- Succeeded by: Andrew Fisher

Personal details
- Born: Dennis Neale Coleman; November 1953 (age 72)
- Party: Labour
- Relations: Iain Coleman (brother)
- Parent: Cllr Pam Coleman
- Education: University of Oxford
- Occupation: Politician

Neale Coleman is a British Labour politician. He is a former senior adviser to Jeremy Corbyn as Leader of the Labour Party, and was a close aide to Ken Livingstone as Mayor of London.

== Early life and education ==
His mother was a former Labour councillor in Barnet and a former Mayor of the borough. His brother is Iain Coleman, the former Labour Leader and Mayor of Hammersmith and Fulham Council and Labour Member of Parliament for Hammersmith and Fulham from 1997 to 2005.

Coleman read Greats at Oxford and graduated with a First.

== Career ==
He joined the Civil Service and became a housing officer in Haringey. In 1982, he was elected as a Westminster City councillor for Maida Vale ward, representing the Labour Party. As a Westminster councillor, he helped reveal the Westminster cemeteries scandal. He lost his seat in 1990. Coleman ran again in 1994, but was unsuccessful.

In 2000, he was appointed Senior Policy Adviser "Best Value" to Mayor of London Ken Livingstone following his election. He was reported to be one of Livingstone's closest advisors, enjoying "virtually immediate access to the mayor". After Livingstone's re-election in 2004, Coleman's salary was raised to £111,000 a year; higher than that of the mayor himself. Coleman was the only senior adviser to continue serving under Livingstone's successor Boris Johnson, who referred to him as "Comrade Coleman".

Coleman was appointed by Jeremy Corbyn to be the Labour Party's Director of Policy following Corbyn's victory in the Labour Party leadership election. Alongside fellow former Livingstone aide, Simon Fletcher, Coleman was dubbed one of the "Mensheviks" in Corbyn's inner circle. He resigned in January 2016 following reports of disagreements with Corbyn's head of strategy and communications Seumas Milne and Andrew Fisher, the leader’s policy adviser.

In 2016, he was appointed as an adviser to London Mayor Sadiq Khan's transition team, but resigned just three weeks into the job following reports that Khan was unwilling to extend Coleman's contract beyond the three-month transition period.

In 2022, Coleman was appointed to chair Westminster City Council's Future of Westminster Commission. The commission includes Coleman's fellow former Westminster City Labour councillors Karen Buck (now the MP for Westminster North, a constituency in the borough) and Jackie Rosenberg.

== See also ==
- Labour Party leadership of Jeremy Corbyn
