= Ben Coleman (politician) =

British politician

Ben Coleman MP
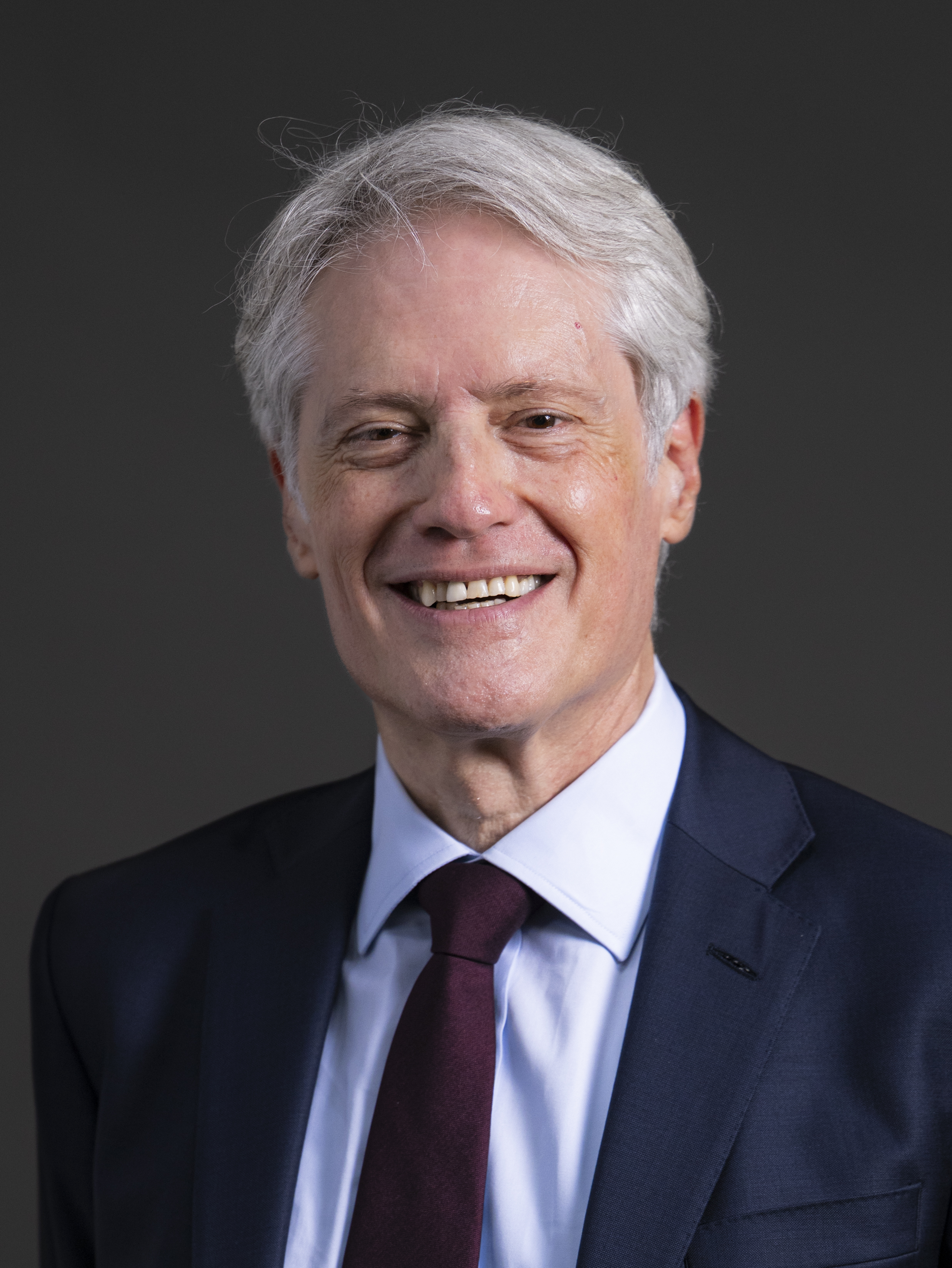
- Official portrait, 2026

Member of Parliament for Chelsea and Fulham
- Incumbent
- Assumed office 4 July 2024
- Preceded by: Greg Hands
- Majority: 152 (0.3%)

Member of Hammersmith and Fulham London Borough Council for Fulham Broadway 2014–2022, for Lillie 2022–2025
- In office 22 May 2014 – 8 January 2025

Personal details
- Party: Labour
- Education: University of Liverpool
- Website: bencoleman.uk

Benjamin John Coleman is a British Labour Party politician who has been the Member of Parliament for Chelsea and Fulham since 2024. He gained the seat from Conservative minister Greg Hands.

In the 1997 general election he stood in the constituency of Broxbourne. He was a Labour councillor on Hammersmith and Fulham London Borough Council from 2014 until 2025, and was deputy leader of the council prior to his election to Parliament.

At the 2024 general election he became the first Labour MP to represent the Chelsea and Fulham constituency, defeating the incumbent Conservative Minister for London Greg Hands by 152 votes. PinkNews listed him as an out LGBTQ+ MP in 2024. The Jewish Chronicle listed him as one of the new Jewish MPs in 2024.

Since 2024, Coleman has served as a member of the Health and Social Care Select Committee.

Parliament of the United Kingdom
| Preceded by Greg Hands | Member of Parliament for Chelsea and Fulham; 2024–present | Incumbent |
