= Nick Raynsford =

British politician (born 1945)

The Right Honourable Nick Raynsford
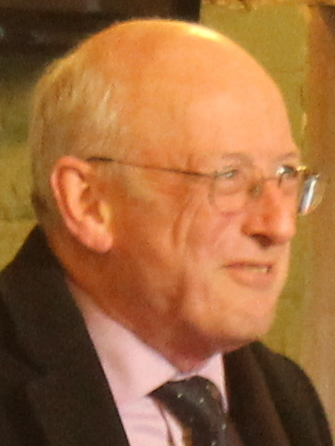
- Raynsford in 2013

Minister of State for Local and Regional Government (Note: Local Government (2001–02))
- In office 11 June 2001 – 10 May 2005
- Prime Minister: Tony Blair
- Preceded by: Hilary Armstrong
- Succeeded by: Phil Woolas

Minister for London
- In office 7 June 2001 – 12 March 2003
- Prime Minister: Tony Blair
- Preceded by: Keith Hill
- Succeeded by: Tony McNulty
- In office 6 May 1997 – 29 July 1999
- Prime Minister: Tony Blair
- Preceded by: John Gummer
- Succeeded by: Keith Hill

Minister of State for Housing and Planning
- In office 29 July 1999 – 7 June 2001
- Prime Minister: Tony Blair
- Preceded by: Hilary Armstrong
- Succeeded by: The Lord Falconer of Thoroton

Minister of State for the Regions
- In office 29 July 1999 – 7 June 2001
- Prime Minister: Tony Blair
- Preceded by: Richard Caborn
- Succeeded by: Alun Michael

Parliamentary Under-Secretary of State for Construction
- In office 6 May 1997 – 29 July 1999
- Prime Minister: Tony Blair
- Preceded by: Office established
- Succeeded by: Chris Leslie (Note: Office vacant between 29 July 1999 and 29 May 2002.)
Parliamentary offices
Member of Parliament for Greenwich and Woolwich Greenwich (1992–1997)
In office 9 April 1992 – 30 March 2015
Preceded by	Rosie Barnes
Succeeded by	Matthew Pennycook
Member of Parliament for Fulham
In office 10 April 1986 – 18 May 1987
Preceded by	Martin Stevens
Succeeded by	Matthew Carrington

Personal details
- Born: Wyvill Richard Nicolls Raynsford; 28 January 1945 (age 81) Northampton, England
- Party: Labour
- Spouses: Anne Jelley (m. 1968; div. 2011) Alison Seabeck (m. 2012)
- Education: Sidney Sussex College, Cambridge

Wyvill Richard Nicolls Raynsford (born 28 January 1945), known as Nick Raynsford, is a British politician who served as a government minister from 1997 to 2005. A member of the Labour Party, he was Member of Parliament (MP) for Greenwich and Woolwich, formerly Greenwich, from 1992 to 2015, having previously been MP for Fulham from 1986 to 1987.

Raised in Northamptonshire, Raynsford was educated at Repton School. He studied history at Sidney Sussex College, Cambridge, where he was involved in opposing the Vietnam War. After serving as a councillor in Hammersmith and Fulham and director of the Shelter Housing Aid Centre, he was elected at a 1986 by-election and served as an MP for a year until losing his seat at the subsequent general election.

Raynsford returned to Parliament at the 1992 general election and joined the government under the premiership of Tony Blair; his roles included Minister of State for Housing and Planning, Minister for London and Minister of State for Local and Regional Government. He stood down from the House of Commons prior to the 2015 general election, after which he went into the public sector advising on planning and construction.

== Early life and education ==
The son of Wyvill Raynsford and Patricia Raynsford (née Dunn), Raynsford was brought up at Milton Manor in Milton Malsor, Northamptonshire. He was privately educated at Repton School and Sidney Sussex College, Cambridge, where he graduated with a BA degree in History in 1966. At Cambridge, he was rusticated for a year after a night climbing incident in which he had displayed a banner against the Vietnam War between the pinnacles of King's College Chapel. He also has a Diploma in Art and Design from the Chelsea School of Art.

== Political career ==
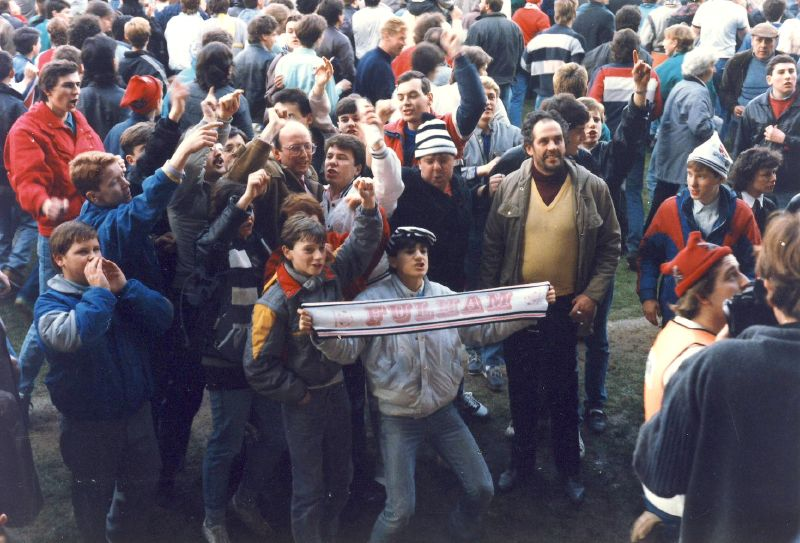
Raynsford (centre left, brown jacket) with other Fulham supporters protesting plans to demolish Craven Cottage, 1987

=== Councillor: 1971–1975 ===
Raynsford was a councillor for the London Borough of Hammersmith and Fulham from 1971 to 1975. Before he was elected to Parliament, he was director of the Shelter Housing Aid Centre. He says a major reason he chose to seek parliamentary office was his involvement in campaigning for better provision for the homeless, achieved through the 1977 Homeless Persons Act. The 1977 Act extended local council responsibility "to provide accommodation for homeless people in their area," and instituted the right of homeless families to a permanent local council tenancy.

=== Early parliamentary career: 1986–1997 ===
Raynsford was first elected a member of parliament (MP) for the Labour Party in a 1986 by-election for Fulham, but at the 1987 general election, lost to Conservative candidate Matthew Carrington. He then became MP for Greenwich at the 1992 general election, and at the 1997 general election, he won the re-drawn seat of Greenwich and Woolwich. He retained the seat at the 2001, 2005 and 2010 general elections, with majorities of 13,433, 10,146 and 10,153 respectively.

In opposition, Raynsford was Shadow Minister for Housing and Construction from 1994, and frontbench spokesperson for London from 1993. From 1992 to 1993, he was a member of the Environment Select Committee.

=== Ministerial career: 1997–2005 ===
Raynsford joined the government in 1997 and held responsibility for construction, housing, planning and the regions. During this time, he was responsible for the implementation of the Decent Homes Standard. In 1997, there were 2.1m houses owned by local authorities and housing associations that did not meet the Decent Homes Standard. By the end of 2010, 92% of social housing met the standard of being warm and weatherproof with reasonably modern facilities.

As the government minister responsible for construction, Raynsford was credited with introducing building regulations which significantly improved standards, including making mandatory disabled access in new builds, increasing energy efficiency standards and fire safety. His position also included responsibility for the Fire Service and the creation of the London Resilience Forum to oversee London's preparedness for dealing with emergencies (see Operation Sassoon). As a local government minister, he led the Local Government Act 2000 through Parliament, which repealed the controversial Section 28.

As Minister for London from 2001 to 2003, Raynsford was responsible for restoring democratic citywide government to London, and the creation of the Greater London Authority and the commission of its home at City Hall.

=== Later parliamentary career: 2005–2015 ===
After the 2005 general election, Raynsford returned to the backbenches. In June 2009, he publicly called for Gordon Brown to resign as Prime Minister, stating at the time, "I personally have considerable respect for Gordon Brown but his leadership is now so seriously damaged that I can't see the likelihood of him leading Labour successfully into the next general election. It's now appropriate for the party to look for a new leader".

On 28 March 2010, The Sunday Times reported that Raynsford earned £9,000 per month from jobs in industries connected to his ministerial career. They focused around three areas of activity – housing, construction and local government – with which Raynsford has been involved throughout his working life.

In opposition again in the 2010–15 Parliament, Raynsford was a consistent critic of the bedroom tax, and in July 2014 co-sponsored the Affordable Homes Bill, which sought to limit the impact of the bedroom tax on tenants in the social rented sector. He also co-chaired a parliamentary inquiry into youth unemployment which encouraged the promotion of apprenticeships in the construction industry.

As a constituency MP, Raynsford promoted regeneration in the Greenwich Borough, including campaigns for the North Greenwich Station on the Jubilee Line, the extension of the DLR to Greenwich and Woolwich, and the campaign to secure a Crossrail Station in Woolwich, and support for bringing the Olympics to his constituency. He also advocated improved river crossings in East and South East London. In May 2014, he expressed his opposition to a memorial to murdered soldier Lee Rigby, suggesting it "would not in my view be helpful" because it "might attract undesirable interest from extremists". Greenwich Council noted they had been "overwhelmed by interest in a local memorial", but also opposed the tribute.

In March 2013, Raynsford announced his intention to stand down as MP for Greenwich and Woolwich at the next general election and cited his age as the reason behind his decision.

== Later career ==
Raynsford remains involved with UK construction. He is a board member of the Construction Industry Council (CIC) and he chaired the group from 2006 to 2008. He was chair of CICAIR Ltd, a wholly owned subsidiary of the CIC, which maintained and operated the Approved Inspectors Register regulating approved inspectors qualified to undertake building control work until 2024. From January 2019 until his resignation in September 2020, he was deputy chairman of Crossrail Limited. He remained involved with Crossrail, acting as a strategic advisor from 2020.

In April 2025, Raynsford was appointed to the UK government's Building Control Independent Panel, reviewing potential changes to building control in England, including possible removal of commercial involvement and transitioning to a national authority decision model.

== Personal life ==
Raynsford married Anne Jelley in 1968, and they had three daughters. They were divorced in 2011, and he is now the husband of Alison Seabeck, the former Labour MP for Plymouth Moor View. Raynsford's ancestry can be seen in Burke's Landed Gentry.

== Notes ==
Parliament of the United Kingdom
Preceded by Martin Stevens	Member of Parliament for Fulham; 1986–1987	Succeeded by Matthew Carrington
Preceded by Rosie Barnes	Member of Parliament for Greenwich; 1992–1997	Constituency abolished
New constituency	Member of Parliament for Greenwich & Woolwich; 1997–2015	Succeeded by Matthew Pennycook
Political offices
Preceded by Hilary Armstrong	Minister of State for Housing and Planning; 1999–2001	Succeeded by The Lord Falconer
