= Hojamyrat Geldimyradov =

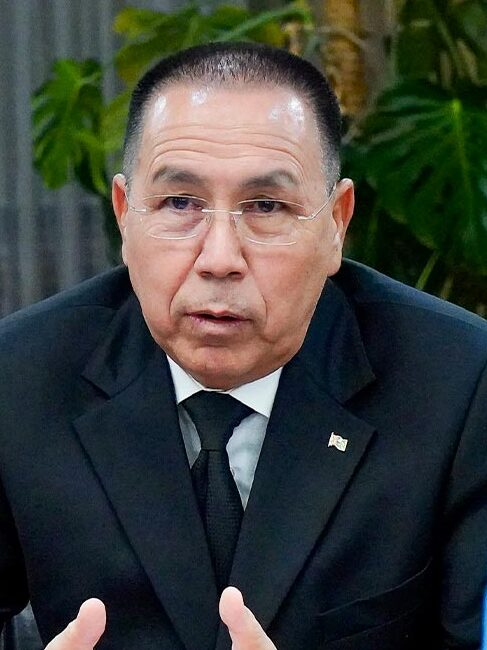
Geldimyradow in 2025

Hojamyrat Geldimyradov (Turkmen: Hojamyrat Geldimyradow, born 1965) is a Turkmen politician. Born in Ahal Province, he was the Minister of Economy and Finance of Turkmenistan from 2007 to 2008.

In 1989, he graduated from the Faculty of Economics and Construction Management of the Turkmen Polytechnic Institute. In 2004, he graduated from the Yaroslav Mudryi National Law University in Kharkiv. From 2005 to 2007, he was deputy minister of economics and finance of Turkmenistan.
