= London Regional Select Committee =

The London Regional Select Committee was one of nine regional select committee of the House of Commons in the Parliament of the United Kingdom. The establishment of the committee was agreed by the House of Commons on 25 June 2009, following the establishment of regional select committees for the eight other regions of England in November 2008, and the appointment of 'regional ministers' by Gordon Brown on his appointment as Prime Minister in June 2007. The committee came into existence on 1 January 2009 and ceased to exist upon the dissolution of Parliament on 12 April 2010.

== Work ==
The purpose of the committee, which was slightly different from the remit of the other regional select committees, was "to examine the Government’s regional policies for London and the Government’s relationship with the Greater London Authority and regional bodies".

The committee recommended that a register of addresses was created to improve the management of the 2011 United Kingdom census.

The New Local Government Network recommended that the committee review the work and policies of the Mayor of London.

== Membership ==
The committee was first appointed by the House of Commons on 14 December 2009, nine months after the appointment of the eight other regional affairs select committees. The committee only contained 5 Labour members and one Independent member as opposed to the 9 members from various parties as was agreed in the original regional committee establishment motion of 12 November 2008, as the Conservatives and Liberal Democrats refused to nominate any members as a sign of their opposition to the existence of regional committees.

Member	Party	Constituency
Karen Buck MP (chair)	Labour	Regent's Park and Kensington North
Jeremy Corbyn MP	Labour	Islington North
Clive Efford MP	Labour	Eltham
Siobhain McDonagh MP	Labour	Mitcham and Morden
Andrew Pelling MP	Independent	Croydon Central
Andy Slaughter MP	Labour	Ealing, Acton and Shepherd's Bush

== Criticism ==
The Shadow Minister for Communities and Local Government, Justine Greening, criticised the choice of members for not adequately representing certain individuals, including those opposed to the expansion of Heathrow Airport.

== See also ==
- Government Office for London
- Minister for London
