= Michael Stewart, Baron Stewart of Fulham =

British politician (1906–1990)

The Right Honourable The Lord Stewart of Fulham CH PC
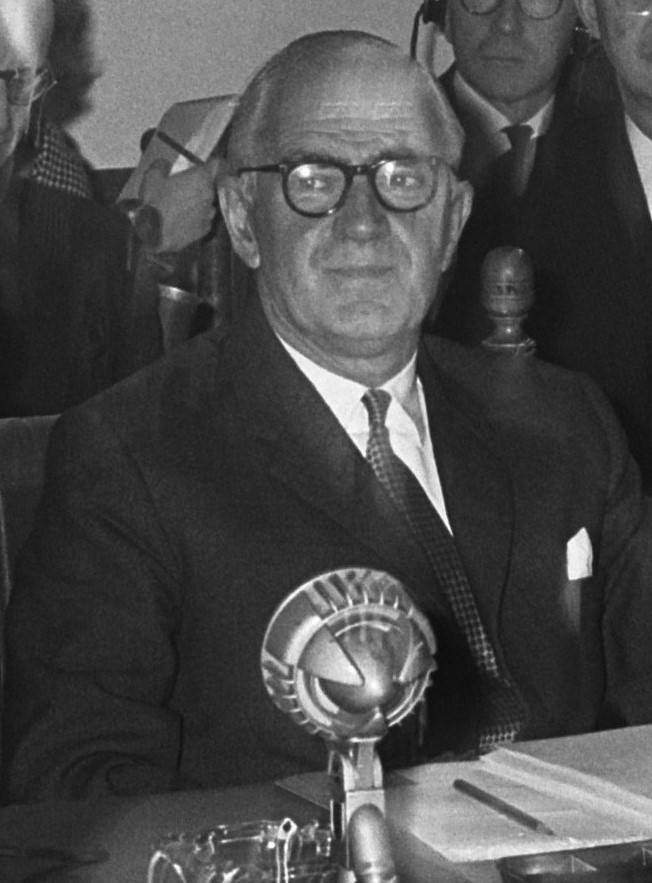
- Stewart in 1965

Secretary of State for Foreign and Commonwealth Affairs Foreign Affairs (1965–1966)
- In office 16 March 1968 – 19 June 1970
- Prime Minister: Harold Wilson
- Preceded by: George Brown
- Succeeded by: Alec Douglas-Home
- In office 22 January 1965 – 11 August 1966
- Prime Minister: Harold Wilson
- Preceded by: Patrick Gordon Walker
- Succeeded by: George Brown

First Secretary of State
- In office 11 August 1966 – 6 April 1968
- Prime Minister: Harold Wilson
- Preceded by: George Brown
- Succeeded by: Barbara Castle

Secretary of State for Economic Affairs
- In office 11 August 1966 – 29 August 1967
- Prime Minister: Harold Wilson
- Preceded by: George Brown
- Succeeded by: Peter Shore

Secretary of State for Education and Science
- In office 16 October 1964 – 22 January 1965
- Prime Minister: Harold Wilson
- Preceded by: Quintin Hogg
- Succeeded by: Anthony Crosland

Member of Parliament for Fulham Fulham East (1945–1955)
- In office 5 July 1945 – 7 April 1979
- Preceded by: William Astor
- Succeeded by: Martin Stevens

Personal details
- Born: Robert Michael Maitland Stewart; 6 November 1906 Bromley, Kent, England
- Died: 10 March 1990 (aged 83) London, England
- Party: Labour
- Spouse: Mary Stewart (m. 1941)
- Education: St. John's College, Oxford
- Profession: Member of Parliament

Robert Michael Maitland Stewart, Baron Stewart of Fulham, CH, PC (6 November 1906 – 10 March 1990) was a British Labour Party politician, life peer and Fabian Socialist who was a Member of Parliament for 34 years, and served twice as Foreign Secretary in the first cabinet of Harold Wilson.

== Early life ==
The son of Robert Wallace Stewart, author and lecturer, and Eva Stewart née Blaxley, Robert Michael Maitland Stewart was born in Bromley. He was educated at Brownhill Road Elementary School, Catford, Christ's Hospital and St. John's College, Oxford, where he graduated with a first class BA in Philosophy, Politics and Economics in 1929. Whilst at Oxford he was involved in student politics and was elected as President of the Oxford Union for Michaelmas Term 1929. He was also the president of St John's Labour Club that same year.

Stewart began his career as an official in the Royal Household during 1931. He worked for a short period with the Secretariat of the League of Nations, before becoming a schoolmaster, first at the Merchant Taylors' School in London, then at Coopers' Company's School, Mile End, and then at Frome, Somerset. During World War II, Stewart served in the Middle East, joining the Intelligence Corps in 1942, before transferring to the Army Educational Corps in 1943. He was promoted to captain in 1944.

On 26 July 1941 he married Mary Birkinshaw, later Baroness Stewart of Alvechurch; they had no children. They were one of the few couples who both held titles in their own right.

== Political career ==
Stewart had contested the Lewisham West constituency in 1931 and 1935. In 1936 he was selected for Fulham East, though due to the outbreak of war there was no election until 1945. Granted leave from the army to contest the seat, Stewart became MP for Fulham East 1945–55, then for Fulham 1955–74, and Hammersmith, Fulham 1974–79. Soon after his initial election, he was made one of the Lords Commissioners of the Treasury (more commonly known as a junior whip), then a junior minister, as Under-Secretary of State for War (1947–51) and later as Parliamentary Secretary to the Ministry of Supply (May–October 1951), filling the vacancy caused by the resignation of John Freeman. Following Labour's defeat in the 1951 election, Stewart was a rising figure on the shadow front bench, first assisting Chuter Ede, the party's main spokesman on education, and then himself serving as Shadow Minister of Education (1955–59) and then as Shadow Minister of Housing and Local Government (1959–64).

Stewart first contested the Labour Party Shadow Cabinet elections in 1955. In 1959, as runner up, he joined the Shadow Cabinet following the resignation of Alf Robens; he was then elected in his own right for the remainder of Labour's period in opposition, topping the poll in 1963. His performance was boosted by his high profile in opposing the government's 1963 Local Government Act and in criticising predatory landlords.

On May 21, 1952 during the British Malayan headhunting scandal, Stewart asked Henry Hopkinson in the House of Commons if the government intended to punish British soldiers caught posing with decapitated human heads in images taken during the Malayan Emergency and leaked by the Daily Worker. Hopkinson confirmed to Stewart that none of the British soldiers would be punished, claiming that said soldiers had never explicitly been forbidden from mutilating corpses.

Stewart was Fabian Summer School director in 1952 and lecturer in 1954. He was Fabian New Year School lecturer in 1954–55 and publicist in 1956. He is listed as a member of the Fabian Society International Bureau Committee during 1957–58 and was mentioned in Fabian News November – December 1964 as a former member of the Fabian Executive Committee.

== Government 1964–70 ==
When Harold Wilson became Prime Minister in 1964, Stewart was appointed Secretary of State for Education and Science. He was promoted to Secretary of State for Foreign Affairs in January 1965 after his predecessor Patrick Gordon Walker's bid to regain a House of Commons seat in the 1965 Leyton by-election failed. He was described by the press as relatively unknown to the public but was extremely well known within Fabian socialist circles.

The most significant international issue during the period was the Vietnam War, which escalated in the years immediately after 1964. The government's stance, in avoiding active entanglement, providing vocal support for the Americans, and involvement in diplomatic initiatives, was driven directly by the Prime Minister. Stewart, a committed Atlanticist, played a supporting role. Nor was Stewart and the Foreign Office the lead for the government over Rhodesia, which declared UDI in 1965: that fell to the Colonial Office. Stewart - and his Foreign Office officials - was in favour of a renewed application to join the EEC, though Wilson was very reluctant to bring the issue to Cabinet because he saw it as divisive. Progress only really began in 1966 and gathered pace under Stewart's successor. The Nuclear Non-Proliferation Treaty was signed in 1967, where Lord Chalfont had been responsible for negotiations on behalf of Britain. There was also success in ending the 'Confrontation' with Indonesia.

In 1966, Stewart swapped jobs with George Brown and became Secretary of State for Economic Affairs and First Secretary of State. He returned to the Foreign Office from 1968 to 1970. As Foreign Secretary, he was instrumental in supplying arms to support the Nigerian military dictatorship's crushing of the secessionist Republic of Biafra in the Nigerian Civil War (when up to one million people died), later saying "It would have been quite easy for me to say: This is going to be difficult – let's cut off all connexion with the Nigerian Government. If I'd done that I should have known that I was encouraging in Africa the principle of tribal secession – with all the misery that could bring to Africa in the future."

== Post-Government ==
Stewart remained foreign affairs spokesman after the 1970 General Election, but only until the Shadow Cabinet elections a month later. His stance on both Vietnam and Biafra had been unpopular with the Parliamentary Labour Party and this resulted in his fall to eighteenth place in the poll. At the age of sixty-three, this was the end of his front bench career.

A committed pro-European, Stewart was leader of the Labour Delegation to the Council of Europe in June 1970, and joint president of the Labour Committee for Europe with George Brown and Roy Jenkins. He served as a member of the European Parliament from 1975 to 1976.

Stewart was a supporter of a United Ireland, supporting a peaceful resolution to the partition of Ireland.

Stewart was made a member of the Privy Council in 1964. He was appointed a Member of the Order of the Companions of Honour (CH) in the 1969 New Year Honours. He retired from the House of Commons in 1979. He was elevated to the House of Lords, being created a life peer with the title Baron Stewart of Fulham, of Fulham in Greater London, on 5 July 1979.

Brian Harrison recorded an oral history interview with Stewart, in March 1978, as part of the Suffrage Interviews project, titled Oral evidence on the suffragette and suffragist movements: the Brian Harrison interviews. Stewart discusses his teaching career and his connection with the Association for Education in Citizenship.

He died at a hospital in London on 10 March 1990, at the age of 83.

== Bibliography ==
- The Forty Hour Week (Fabian Society), (1936)
- Bias and Education for Democracy (1937)
- The British Approach to Politics (1938)
- Policy and weapons in the nuclear age (1955)
- Modern Forms of Government (1959)
- An incomes policy for Labour (1963)
- Fabian Freeway Rose L. Martin (1966)
- Labour and the economy : a socialist strategy (1972)
- Life and Labour (1980) – his autobiography
- European Security: the case against unilateral nuclear disarmament (1981)

Parliament of the United Kingdom
Preceded by William Astor	Member of Parliament for Fulham East; 1945–1955	Constituency abolished
New constituency	Member of Parliament for Fulham; 1955–1979	Succeeded by Martin Stevens
Political offices
Preceded by Arthur Pearson	Comptroller of the Household (government whip); 1945–1946	Succeeded by Frank Collindridge
Preceded by Quintin Hogg	Secretary of State for Education and Science; 1964–1965	Succeeded by Anthony Crosland
Preceded by Patrick Gordon Walker	Secretary of State for Foreign Affairs; 1965–1966	Succeeded by George Brown
Preceded by George Brown	First Secretary of State; 1966–1968	Succeeded by Barbara Castle
Preceded by George Brown	Secretary of State for Economic Affairs; 1966–1967	Succeeded by Peter Shore
Preceded by George Brown	Secretary of State for Foreign Affairs; 1968	Succeeded by Himself as Secretary of State for Foreign and Commonwealth Affairs
Preceded by Himself as Secretary of State for Foreign Affairs	Secretary of State for Foreign and Commonwealth Affairs; 1968–1970	Succeeded by Alec Douglas-Home
Preceded by George Thomson as Secretary of State for Commonwealth Affairs	Secretary of State for Foreign and Commonwealth Affairs; 1968–1970	Succeeded by Alec Douglas-Home
Party political offices
Preceded by New position	Leader of the European Parliamentary Labour Party; 1975–1976	Succeeded by John Prescott
