= President of the Local Government Board =

The President of the Local Government Board was a ministerial post, frequently a Cabinet position, in the United Kingdom, established in 1871. The Local Government Board itself was established in 1871 and took over supervisory functions from the Board of Trade and the Home Office, including the Local Government Act Office, which had been established by the Local Government Act 1858, as well as the Poor Law Board, which it replaced.

The position was abolished in 1919, following the First World War, and the duties transferred to the new position of Minister of Health.

== List of presidents of the Local Government Board (1871–1919) ==
President of the Local Government Board
Liberal Conservative
Portrait	Name Constituency	Term of office		Political party	Government	Ref
	James Stansfeld; MP for Halifax	August; 1871	March; 1874	Liberal	Gladstone I	
	George Sclater-Booth; MP for Northern Hampshire	March; 1874	May; 1880	Conservative	Disraeli II	
	John George Dodson; MP for Scarborough	May; 1880	1882	Liberal	Gladstone II	
	Sir Charles Dilke; 2nd Baronet; MP for Chelsea	1882	1885	Liberal	Gladstone II	
	Arthur Balfour; MP for Manchester East	1885	1886	Conservative	Salisbury I	
	Joseph Chamberlain; MP for Birmingham West	1886	1886	Liberal	Gladstone III	
	James Stansfeld; MP for Halifax	1886	1886	Liberal	Gladstone III	
	Charles Ritchie; MP for Tower Hamlets, St George Division	1886	1892	Conservative	Salisbury II	
	Henry Fowler; MP for Wolverhampton East	1892	1894	Liberal	Gladstone IV	
	George Shaw-Lefevre; MP for Bradford Central	1894	1895	Liberal	Rosebery	
	Henry Chaplin; MP for Sleaford	1895	1900	Conservative	Salisbury (III & IV) (Cons.–Lib.U.)	
	Walter Long; MP for Bristol South	1900	1905	Conservative	Salisbury (III & IV) (Cons.–Lib.U.)	
	Walter Long; MP for Bristol South	1900	1905	Conservative	Balfour (Cons.–Lib.U.)	
	Gerald Balfour; MP for Leeds Central	1905	11 December 1905	Conservative	Balfour (Cons.–Lib.U.)	
	John Burns; MP for Battersea	11 December 1905	1914	Liberal (Lib-Lab)	Campbell-Bannerman	
	John Burns; MP for Battersea	11 December 1905	1914	Liberal (Lib-Lab)	Asquith (I–III)	
	Herbert Samuel; MP for Cleveland	1914	1915	Liberal	Asquith (I–III)	
	Walter Long; MP for Strand	1915	1916	Conservative	Asquith Coalition (Lib.–Cons.–Lab.)	
	David Alfred Thomas; 1st Baron Rhondda	13 December 1916	1917	Liberal	Lloyd George (I & II) (Lib.–Cons.–Lab.)	
	William Hayes Fisher; MP for Fulham	2 July 1917	1918	Conservative	Lloyd George (I & II) (Lib.–Cons.–Lab.)	
	Auckland Geddes; MP for Basingstoke	1918	1919	Conservative	Lloyd George (I & II) (Lib.–Cons.–Lab.)	
	Christopher Addison; MP for Shoreditch	1919	1919	Liberal (Coalition)	Lloyd George (I & II) (Lib.–Cons.–Lab.)	
