= Government Office for London =

The Government Office for London was a government body established by the Government of the United Kingdom to manage the governance of Greater London.

== Establishment ==
The Government Office for London was established in 1994, in order to enable Whitehall to function as the strategic authority for Greater London following the abolition of the Greater London Council.

== Work ==
The organisation was led by a regional director, which was compared to a prefect in France in the Local Government Chronicle.

It worked with the London Planning Advisory Committee to write strategic guidance for planning authorities. The office administered the Single Regeneration Budge Fund (SRB) during the 1990s.

The organisation was partially responsible for of the preparations for the London

Tony Travers described the organisation as one of the most important reforms instituted after 1992.

== Abolition ==
As early as 2003, the British Government had been considering transferring its responsibilities to the Greater London Authority.

The organisation was abolished as part of the 2010 quango reforms.

== See also ==
- Government Offices for the English regions
- London Regional Select Committee
- Minister for London
