= Caroline Thomson =

British business executive (born 1954)

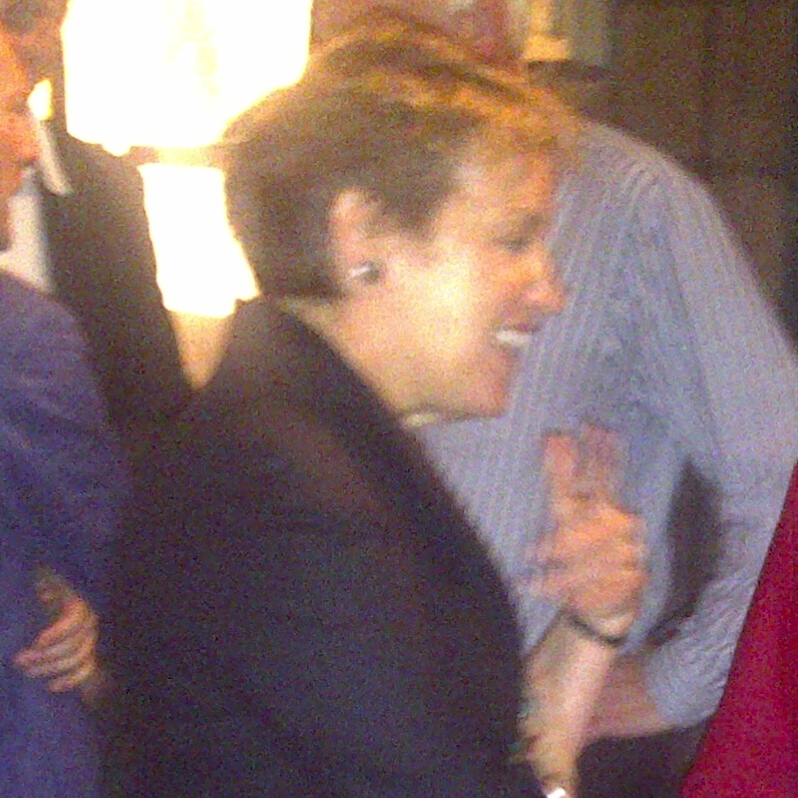
- Born: Caroline Agnes Morgan Thomson; 15 May 1954 (age 72)
- Education: University of York
- Employer: BBC
- Known for: Former senior executive at the BBC
- Board member of: BBC Board (April 2025-present)
- Spouse: Roger Liddle, Baron Liddle
- Parent: George Thomson, Baron Thomson of Monifieth (father)

Caroline Agnes Morgan Thomson (born 15 May 1954) is a British business executive. Thomson was the chief operating officer at the BBC from 2006 to 2012 and chair of Oxfam until October 2020. Thomson has been a member of the BBC Board since April 2025.

== Early life and career ==
Thomson is the elder daughter of Labour peer George Thomson, Baron Thomson of Monifieth. She was educated at Mary Datchelor Girls' School in Camberwell, a grammar school, and graduated from York University, where she studied history and economics.

She first joined the BBC as a journalist trainee in 1975, ultimately becoming a producer on Analysis (Radio 4) and later Panorama (BBC1) before becoming personal assistant to SDP leader Roy Jenkins in 1982. She spent over a decade at Channel 4 from 1984, initially as a commissioning editor, later as Head of Corporate Affairs from 1990, before rejoining the BBC in 1996 as deputy director of the World Service. She became the corporation's Director of Policy and Legal Affairs in July 2000, a job description later expanded to include Strategy, before being promoted to chief operating officer in 2006. In 2011 she was paid £385,000 by the organisation before being made redundant. The Commons Public Accounts Committee suggested that her £670,000 redundancy pay-off was effectively paid to "compensate" her for missing out on the job of director-general.

In October 2013 she became executive director of the English National Ballet.

Since November 2012, she has been Chair of Digital UK. She is also chair of Tomorrow's People Trust's Ambassadors group and Trustee to a number of charities including the National Gallery.

On 3 April 2025, Thomson was appointed to the BBC's board of directors as its senior independent director. undertaking a four-year term until 2029.

== Personal life ==
Caroline Thomson is married to the Labour peer Roger Liddle and lives in north west Cumbria, England. She is a deputy lord-lieutenant for the county of Cumbria.
