= 1986 Fulham by-election =

1986 UK parliamentary by-election

- 10 April 1986

Constituency of Fulham
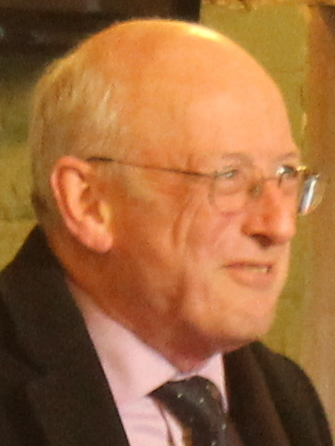

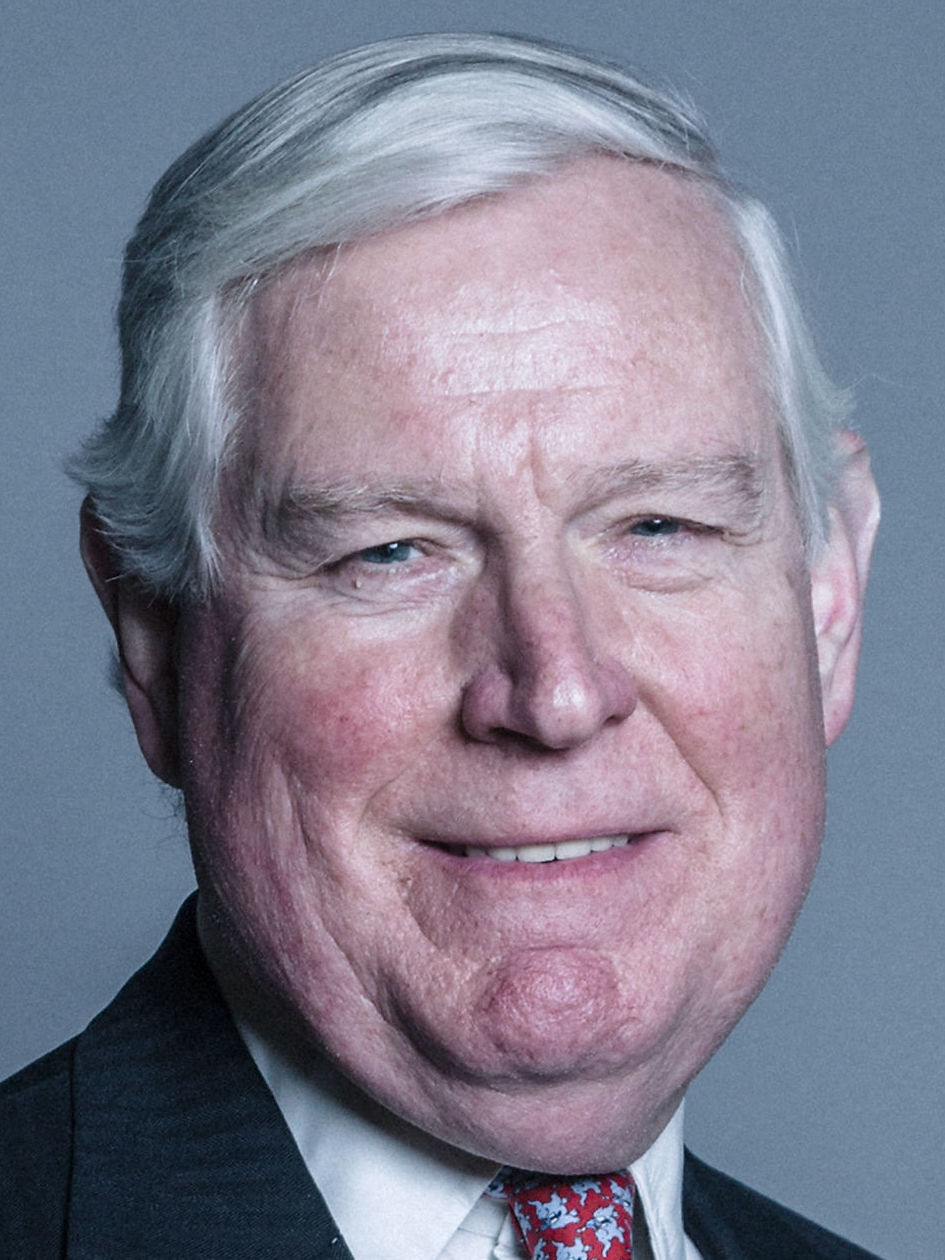

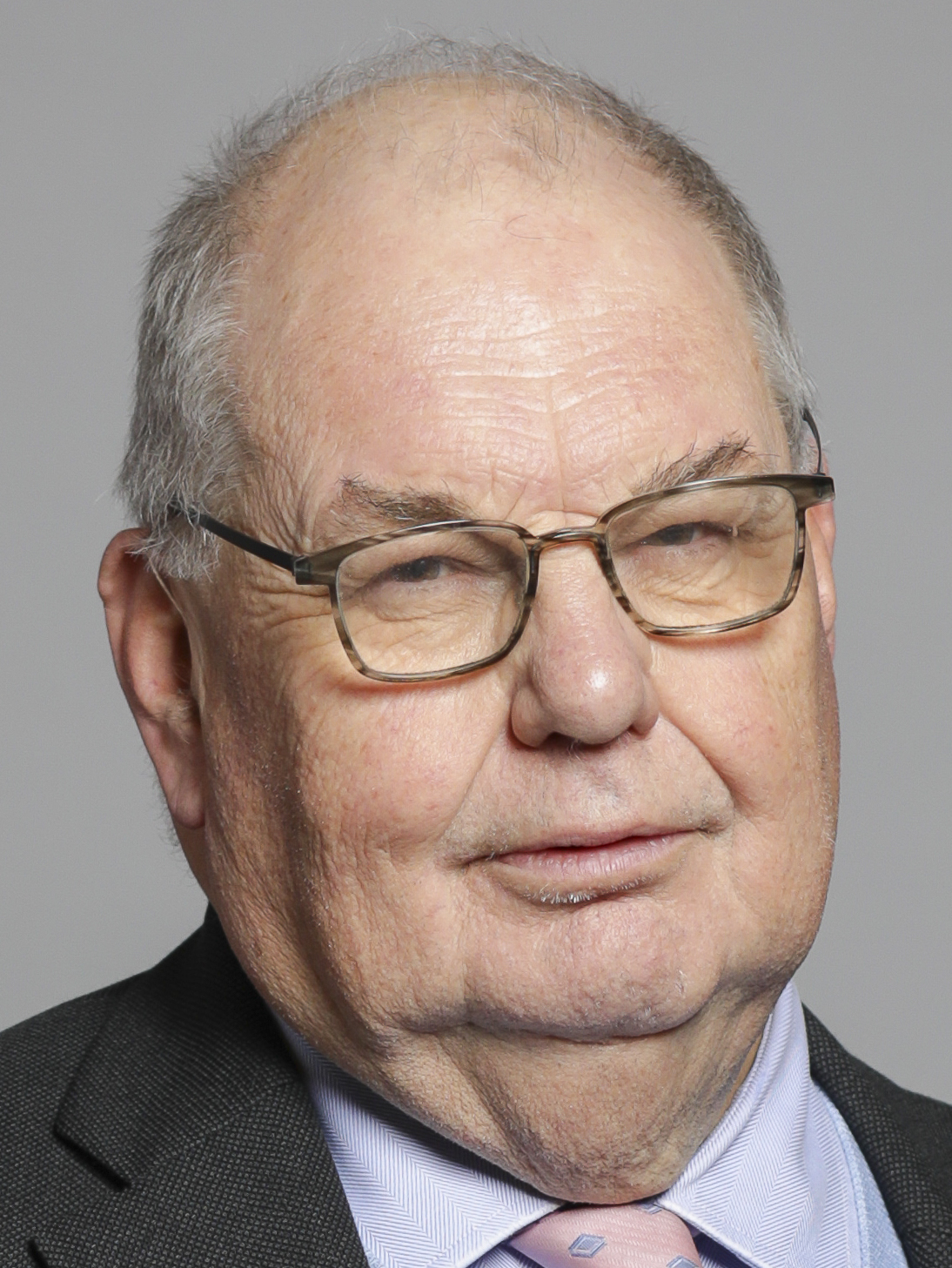
	First party	Second party	Third party
Candidate	Nick Raynsford	Matthew Carrington	Roger Liddle
Party	Labour	Conservative	SDP
Popular vote	16,451	12,948	6,953
Percentage	43.20%	34.00%	18.26%
Swing	▲9.17%	▼12.18%	▲0.01%
MP before election
Martin Stevens
Conservative
Subsequent MP
Nick Raynsford
Labour

The 1986 Fulham by-election, in Fulham, on 10 April 1986 was held following the death of the Conservative Member of Parliament (MP) Martin Stevens on 10 January that year. In a seat that had changed hands on a few occasions, it was won by Nick Raynsford of Labour, only to be regained by the Tories in the general election 14 months later.

== Candidates ==
- Jane Birdwood was a veteran activist on the far right who was variously associated with the National Front and British National Party
- James "Boyd" Black advocated the right of Northern Ireland to directly elect its own government and was a leading member of the British and Irish Communist Organisation
- Matthew Carrington captured the seat for the Conservatives at the following election
- John Creighton was the owner of a local wine shop
- Liza Duke called for the abolition of Parliament
- Roger Liddle later went on to become an adviser to Tony Blair and Peter Mandelson
- Nick Raynsford later returned to Parliament as MP for Greenwich and Greenwich & Woolwich
- Rev. Geoffrey Rolph represented the Fellowship Party, which supported pacifism and opposed nuclear power
- Reginald Simmerson, a regular by-election candidate, campaigned against British membership of the European Community. Following his death in 1998 the Anti-Common Market League established a prize in his memory
- Jon Swinden ran for the Humanist Party which advocates the humanism of Mario Rodríguez Cobos
- David Sutch was the founder and leader of the Official Monster Raving Loony Party

== Result ==
Fulham by-election, 1986
Party	Candidate	Votes	%	±%
Labour	Nick Raynsford	16,451	43.2	+9.17
Conservative	Matthew Carrington	12,948	34.0	−12.18
SDP	Roger Liddle	6,953	18.26	+0.01
England Demands Repatriation	Jane Birdwood	226	0.59	N/A
Monster Raving Loony	David Sutch	134	0.35	N/A
Connoisseur Wine Party	John Creighton	127	0.33	N/A
Democratic Rights for Northern Ireland	James Black	98	0.26	N/A
Fellowship	Geoffrey Rolph	39	0.1	N/A
Humanist	Jon Swinden	38	0.1	N/A
Captain Rainbows Universal Party	Liza Duke	37	0.1	N/A
All Party Anti-Common Market	Reginald Simmerson	33	0.09	N/A
Majority		3,503	9.2	N/A
Turnout		38,084		
Labour gain from Conservative		Swing		

== Previous election ==
General election 1983: Fulham
Party	Candidate	Votes	%	±%
Conservative	Martin Stevens	18,204	46.2	−0.5
Labour	A Powell	13,415	34.03	−9.2
Liberal	David Rendel	9,174	18.3	+9.3
Ecology	J Grimes	277	0.7	N/A
National Front	R Pearce	229	0.6	−0.6
Independent Liberal	J Keats	102	0.3	N/A
Majority		4,798	12.15	+8.7
Turnout		39,421	76.1	−0.0
Conservative hold		Swing		
