= Muhammetgeldi Serdarov =

Turkmen politician and economist

Muhammetgeldi Nurgeldiyevich Serdarov (Turkmen: Muhammetgeldi Nurgeldiýewiç Serdarow) is a Turkmen politician and economist, who served as Minister of Finance of Turkmenistan from July 2020 to February 2023.

== Biography ==
Serdarov was born in 1980 in the village of Archman in the Ahal province of the Turkmen SSR. He graduated in 2000 from the Turkmen State Institute of Transportation and Communications with a degree in economics. He initially worked as a bookkeeper at the Ahalteke Stud Farm, starting in 1997. In 2000, he became the chief bookkeeper of the Ashgabat State Passenger Motor Transport Enterprise. From 2001 to 2005 Serdarov served as assistant to the minister of construction.

From 2005 to 2007 he headed the state tax service of a district in Ahal, and for the city of Buzmeyin (then called Abadan). In 2007, he was hired as a specialist in the construction and construction materials department of the Cabinet of Ministers. From 2008 to 2013 he was head of the construction coordination department, then head of the domestic economic development department of the city of Ashgabat. From 2013 to 2015 he was head of the state directorate for methodology, price formation, and expendable standards of the Ministry of Construction and Architecture.

In 2015, Serdarov was appointed head of the Main Directorate of Economics and Development of Ashgabat. By 2019, he was made head of the Main Directorate for Finances and Economics. That same year, he was appointed deputy minister of economy and finance of Turkmenistan. He was appointed head of the ministry on July 3, 2020.

== Awards ==
- Medal "25 years of Turkmenistan's Neutrality"
