= Sally Powell =

British politician (born 1955)

Dame Sally Ann Powell, DBE (née Vickers; born 2 October 1955) is a former British politician, who was a local councillor for the Labour Party, and deputy leader of the Local Government Association's Labour Group.

== Career ==
Sally Ann Vickers was born in Bristol and educated at the Royal Ballet School; she became a dancer with the Sadler's Wells Royal Ballet. She later attended Southampton University, where she obtained a law degree in 1984, and qualified as a solicitor.

In 1986 she was elected as a councillor in Hammersmith and Fulham and swiftly became chair of the Environment Committee. The reorganisation of leadership roles in local government changed her job title but she remained responsible for regeneration in the borough until Labour lost power in 2006. Her primary prominence has been in associations representing groups of local authorities. She was Vice Chair of the Association of London Government from 1996, and was a member of the London Development Agency, Chair of Greater London Enterprise, Deputy Chair of Business Link for London and Vice Chair of the Improvement and Development Agency (IDeA). She became one of the UK's representatives on the Committee of the Regions in 1994. In the New Year Honours list of 2001 she was awarded a Damehood for services to London and to local government.

Powell, as Deputy Leader of the Labour Group on the Local Government Association, was one of two councillor representatives on the Labour Party's National Executive Committee until she retired in 2008.

== Personal life ==
Powell was married to Iain Coleman, former Member of Parliament for Hammersmith and Fulham, until his death in September 2025; they have one son.
