= Mary Stewart, Baroness Stewart of Alvechurch =

British politician and educator (1903–1984)

The Right Honourable The Baroness Stewart of Alvechurch JP

Member of the House of Lords
- In office 1975–1984

Chair of the Fabian Society
- In office 1962–1963
- Preceded by: Anthony Crosland
- Succeeded by: Brian Abel-Smith

Personal details
- Born: Mary Elizabeth Henderson Birkinshaw; 8 May 1903 Bradford, Yorkshire, England
- Died: 28 December 1984 (aged 81)
- Party: Labour
- Spouses: Robert Godfrey Goodyear (m. 1931; div. 1941) Michael Stewart, Baron Stewart of Fulham (m. 1941)

Mary Elizabeth Henderson Stewart, Baroness Stewart of Alvechurch, JP (née Birkinshaw; 8 May 1903 – 28 December 1984) was a British politician and educator. She was a baroness in her own right and the wife of Labour Foreign Secretary, Michael Stewart.

== Early life and education ==
The daughter of commercial traveller Herbert Birkinshaw and Isabella née Garbutt, Mary was born in Bradford. The family moved when she was four and she was educated at King Edward VI High School for Girls (KEHS) Birmingham, and Bedford College, University of London, graduating with a BA in Philosophy in 1928. She taught psychology and sociology to Workers' Educational Association students.

== Career ==
During World War II, Stewart served with the Women's Auxiliary Air Force (WAAF) at locations around the country. After the war she took an interest in education and psychology and Barbara Wooton encouraged her to become a magistrate in the juvenile courts. She worked for the Workers' Educational Association, as a tutor until 1964. She became a member of the Fabian Society Executive, serving as chairman in 1963–64. She wrote papers on the Fabians' behalf arguing that juveniles should be dealt with more leniently. In 1964 she published a short paper titled "Unpaid Public Service" which looked at the role of volunteers on committees. She argued that expenses should be paid and that these committees should meet in the evenings.

She was also involved in local hospitals, schools and became the chair of the East London Juvenile Court magistrates.

=== House of Lords ===
Stewart was created a life peer as Baroness Stewart of Alvechurch, of Fulham in Greater London, on 15 January 1975. She was introduced to the House of Lords on 28 January 1975. She made her maiden speech on 26 March 1975 during a debate on direct grant grammar schools.

== Personal life ==
She married an advertising clerk named Robert Godfrey Goodyear in 1931 and they were divorced in 1941. She then married Michael Stewart two months later on 26 July 1941. She and her second husband were one of the few couples to have held titles in their own right.

Stewart died on 28 December 1984.

Party political offices
Preceded by Anthony Crosland	Chair of the Fabian Society; 1962–1963	Succeeded by Brian Abel-Smith
