= Matthew Carrington, Baron Carrington of Fulham =

British politician (born 1947)

The Right Honourable The Lord Carrington of Fulham
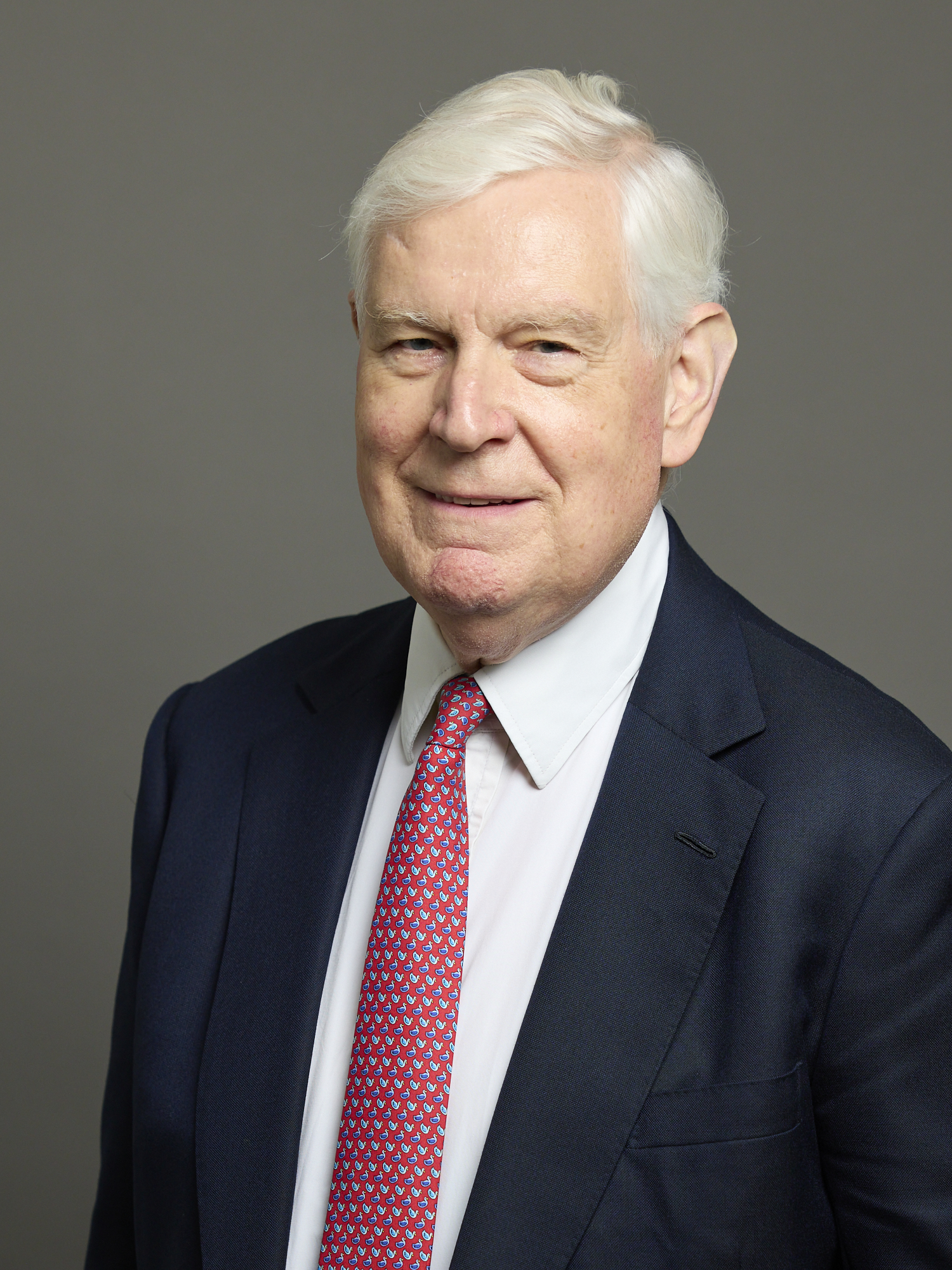
- Official portrait, 2025

Member of the House of Lords
- Lord Temporal
- Life peerage 11 September 2013

Assistant Government Whip (HM Treasury)
- In office December 1996 – May 1997
- Prime Minister: John Major

Member of Parliament for Fulham
- In office 11 June 1987 – 8 April 1997
- Preceded by: Nick Raynsford
- Succeeded by: Constituency abolished

Personal details
- Born: 19 October 1947 (age 78)
- Party: Conservative

Matthew Hadrian Marshall Carrington, Baron Carrington of Fulham (born 19 October 1947) is a British politician. Formerly the Conservative Member of Parliament for Fulham from 1987 to 1997, in September 2013 Carrington was made a life peer and member of the House of Lords.

== Early life ==
Carrington was born in London and was educated at the Lycée Français Charles de Gaulle and Imperial College London, during which time he chaired the Imperial College Conservative Society and graduated with a BSc and ARCS in Physics in 1969. He then attended the London Business School, where he received an MBA. He was a banker with the First National Bank of Chicago (now the First Chicago Bank) between 1974 and 1978, and then the Saudi International Bank between 1978 and 1987. He subsequently became chairman of the Outdoor Advertising Association and chief executive of the Retail Motor Industry Federation.

== Political career ==
Carrington first stood for Parliament at Tottenham in 1979, coming second to the incumbent Labour MP Norman Atkinson.

He unsuccessfully contested the Fulham seat at a by-election in 1986 but won it at the general election a year later, defeating the Labour by-election victor Nick Raynsford (who returned to Parliament five years later as the Member for Greenwich). Carrington was Parliamentary private secretary to John Patten when he was a Home Office Minister between November 1990 and April 1992, and then when Patten was promoted to Secretary of State for Education. Carrington returned to the backbenches before joining John Major's government against as an Assistant Whip between 1996 and the 1997 general election, simultaneously serving as Chairman of the Treasury Select Committee.

The Fulham constituency disappeared in the boundary changes ahead of the 1997 election, and Carrington was selected as the Conservative candidate for the new Hammersmith and Fulham constituency, but was defeated by the Labour candidate Iain Coleman. He failed to regain the seat at the 2001 general election, but Carrington stayed active in local politics, and was elected Chairman of the Kensington, Chelsea and Fulham Conservatives on 28 March 2012. On 11 September 2013 he was created a life peer taking the title Baron Carrington of Fulham, of Fulham in the London Borough of Hammersmith and Fulham. Carrington is a non-executive director of the Sharia-compliant Gatehouse Bank and the Arab-British Chamber of Commerce, as well as a trustee of St John's, Notting Hill.

== Personal life ==
His parents were Walter and Dilys Carrington, teachers of the Alexander technique. Carrington was married to Mary Lou, who died in 2008. Mary Lou held senior positions at the London International Financial Futures and Options Exchange between 1985 and 1998, and was an assistant vice president of the First National Bank of Chicago, where Matthew Carrington had also worked. Mary Lou had also been elected a common councilman for the City of London ward of Lime Street. They had one daughter, Victoria.

Parliament of the United Kingdom
Preceded by Nick Raynsford	Member of Parliament for Fulham; 1987–1997	Succeeded by Constituency abolished (successor constituency: Hammersmith and Fulham)
Orders of precedence in the United Kingdom
Preceded by The Lord Finkelstein	Gentlemen; Baron Carrington of Fulham	Followed by The Lord Sherbourne of Didsbury
