= Martin Stevens (politician) =

British politician

Martin Stevens (31 July 1929 – 10 January 1986) was a British Conservative Party politician.

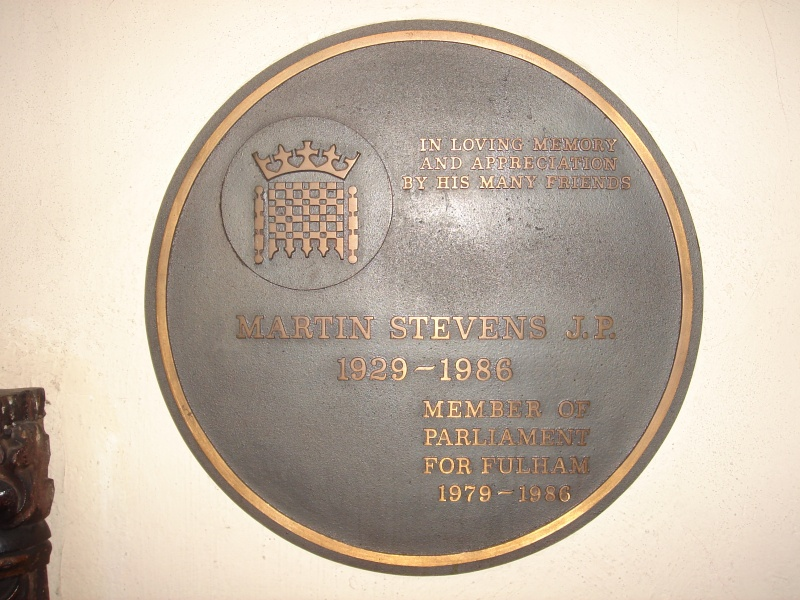
Memorial plaque, All Saints, Fulham, London

== Early life ==
Stevens was educated at Orley Farm School, Bradfield College and Trinity College, Oxford, and was a company director for Granada Television International.

== Political career ==
Stevens served as a member of the London County Council from 1955 to 1958 and a councillor on Camberwell Borough Council from 1959 to 1965.

Stevens unsuccessfully contested Dulwich in 1964 and 1966. He became a Member of Parliament for Fulham in 1979 when he gained the seat from Labour. He supported reform for maintenance payments in divorce proceedings, and some of his proposals were adopted by the government in 1984.

== Death ==
Over the Christmas holiday in 1985, Stevens fell ill with a leg infection while on holiday in Africa. His condition worsened during his travel home, and he was admitted to hospital in Poissy, France, a suburb of Paris. He lapsed into a coma, caused by sepsis and an unspecified heart condition, and he died there on 10 January 1986, aged 56. Labour's Nick Raynsford gained his seat in the following by-election, although it was regained by the Conservatives in 1987.

== Personal life ==
Stevens was openly gay and was a member of the Campaign for Homosexual Equality.

Parliament of the United Kingdom
Preceded by Michael Stewart	Member of Parliament for Fulham; 1979–1986	Succeeded by Nick Raynsford
