= Minister for London =

United Kingdom Government ministerial post

United Kingdom Minister for London
- Incumbent; Office not in use since 5 July 2024
- Department for Business and Trade
- Status: Minister of the Crown
- Reports to: The Prime Minister
- Seat: Westminster
- Appointer: The King (on advice of the Prime Minister)
- Term length: At His Majesty's Pleasure
- Inaugural holder: John Gummer
- Formation: 1994

The Minister for London is a Minister of the Crown in His Majesty's Government. The officeholder is responsible for policy relating to Greater London, including informing members of Parliament in the House of Commons on the activities of the Greater London Authority. The office has not been in use since 5 July 2024.

== History ==
London had been under the authority of the London County Council and then the Greater London Council (GLC), but Margaret Thatcher abolished the GLC in 1986 after clashes with its leader, Ken Livingstone. Most of the municipal powers were then devolved to the 32 individual boroughs. However, under John Major the need for more centralised organisation was addressed by a series of moves. John Gummer was appointed Minister for London concurrently with his tenure as Secretary of State for Environment, and in 1994 the Government Office for London was established. After Tony Blair entered office, the Labour government set up an elected Mayor of London. This office, along with a reconstituted Greater London Authority, worked with the Minister and the Government Office.

The post was scrapped by David Cameron after he came to office in 2010; however, it was revived in 2016 by his successor, Theresa May, and was assigned to Gavin Barwell.

== List of ministers for London ==
Colour key (for political parties):
Conservative Labour

Portrait	Name	Term of office		Concurrently held office	Political party	Prime Minister
	John Gummer; MP for Suffolk Coastal	1994	2 May 1997	– Secretary of State for the Environment	Conservative	John Major
	Nick Raynsford; MP for Greenwich and Woolwich	2 May 1997	29 July 1999	– Parliamentary Under-Secretary of State for Construction	Labour	Tony Blair
	Keith Hill; MP for Streatham	29 July 1999	7 June 2001	– Parliamentary Under-Secretary of State for Transport	Labour	Tony Blair
	Nick Raynsford; MP for Greenwich and Woolwich	7 June 2001	12 March 2003	– Minister of State for Local and Regional Government (Note: Local Government (2001–02))	Labour	Tony Blair
	Tony McNulty; MP for Harrow East	12 March 2003	13 June 2003	– Parliamentary Under-Secretary of State for Transport	Labour	Tony Blair
	Keith Hill; MP for Streatham	13 June 2003	6 May 2005	– Minister of State for Housing and Planning	Labour	Tony Blair
	Jim Fitzpatrick; MP for Poplar and Canning Town	6 May 2005	28 June 2007	– Parliamentary Under-Secretary of State for International Development	Labour	Tony Blair
	Tessa Jowell; MP for Dulwich and West Norwood	28 June 2007	3 October 2008	– Minister for the Olympics – Paymaster General	Labour	Gordon Brown
	Tony McNulty; MP for Harrow East	3 October 2008	5 June 2009	– Minister of State for Employment and Welfare Reform	Labour	Gordon Brown
	Tessa Jowell; MP for Dulwich and West Norwood	5 June 2009	11 May 2010	– Paymaster General – Minister for the Olympics – Minister for the Cabinet Office	Labour	Gordon Brown
Office not in use (Note: Boris Johnson served as Mayor of London from 2008 to 2016)		11 May 2010	17 July 2016	N/A		David Cameron (I·II)
	Gavin Barwell; MP for Croydon Central	17 July 2016	9 June 2017	– Minister of State for Housing and Planning	Conservative	Theresa May
	Greg Hands; MP for Chelsea and Fulham	13 June 2017	9 January 2018	– Minister of State for Trade Policy	Conservative	Theresa May
	Jo Johnson; MP for Orpington	9 January 2018	9 November 2018	– Minister of State for Transport	Conservative	Theresa May
	Nick Hurd; MP for Ruislip, Northwood and Pinner	14 November 2018	18 December 2019	– Minister for Policing and the Fire Service	Conservative	
	Nick Hurd; MP for Ruislip, Northwood and Pinner	14 November 2018	18 December 2019	– Minister for Policing and the Fire Service	Conservative	Boris Johnson
	Chris Philp; MP for Croydon South	18 December 2019	13 February 2020	– Parliamentary Under Secretary of State for Justice (until 25 July 2019) – Minister of State for Northern Ireland (from 25 July 2019)	Conservative	Boris Johnson
	Paul Scully; MP for Sutton and Cheam	13 February 2020	13 November 2023	– Parliamentary Under-Secretary of State for Small Business, Consumers and Labour Markets (until 8 July 2022) – Minister of State for Local Government and Building Safety (8 July 2022 to 27 October 2022) – Parliamentary Under-Secretary of State for Tech and the Digital Economy (from 27 October 2022)	Conservative	
	Paul Scully; MP for Sutton and Cheam	13 February 2020	13 November 2023	– Parliamentary Under-Secretary of State for Small Business, Consumers and Labour Markets (until 8 July 2022) – Minister of State for Local Government and Building Safety (8 July 2022 to 27 October 2022) – Parliamentary Under-Secretary of State for Tech and the Digital Economy (from 27 October 2022)	Conservative	Liz Truss
	Paul Scully; MP for Sutton and Cheam	13 February 2020	13 November 2023	– Parliamentary Under-Secretary of State for Small Business, Consumers and Labour Markets (until 8 July 2022) – Minister of State for Local Government and Building Safety (8 July 2022 to 27 October 2022) – Parliamentary Under-Secretary of State for Tech and the Digital Economy (from 27 October 2022)	Conservative	Rishi Sunak
	Greg Hands; MP for Chelsea and Fulham	13 November 2023	5 July 2024	– Minister of State for Trade Policy	Conservative	Rishi Sunak
Office not in use						

== Shadow Minister ==
The position of Shadow Minister for London was retained by Labour under the leadership of Ed Miliband, and was held by Tessa Jowell during Harriet Harman's tenure as acting leader and then by Sadiq Khan from 2013 during Miliband's leadership. However, after Khan's nomination as Labour's candidate for Mayor of London and Jeremy Corbyn's leadership, the office remained vacant while Labour were in opposition. Following the defeat of the Conservatives at the 2024 general election, Gareth Bacon was appointed as Shadow Minister for London by Leader of the Opposition Rishi Sunak on 19 July 2024. He has stayed in post since the election of Kemi Badenoch as Leader of the Conservative Party.

== See also ==
- Regional minister
- Government Office for London
- London Regional Select Committee
