= Fulham (UK Parliament constituency) =

Parliamentary constituency in the United Kingdom, 1955–1997

- Former borough constituency for the House of Commons

1885–1918
- Seats: One
- Created from: Chelsea
- Replaced by: Fulham East and Fulham West

1955–1997
- Created from: Fulham East and Fulham West
- Replaced by: Hammersmith and Fulham

Fulham was a borough constituency centred on the London district of Fulham. It was represented in the House of Commons of the Parliament of the United Kingdom from 1885 until 1918 and from 1955 to 1997.

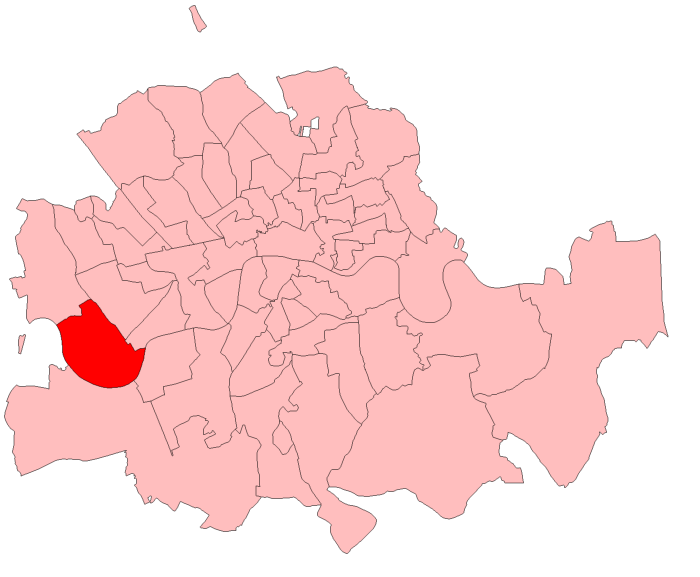
Fulham in the Metropolitan area, boundaries 1885-1918

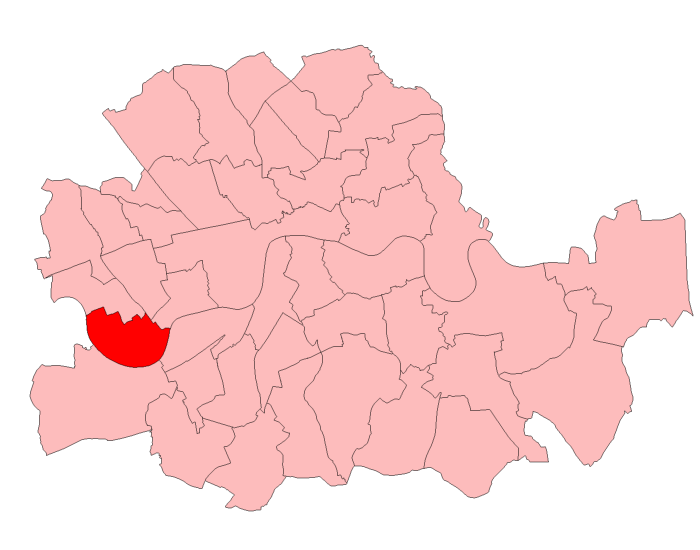
Fulham in the County of London, boundaries 1955-74

Between 1918 and 1955 it was divided into two constituencies, Fulham East and Fulham West. At the 1997 general election it was replaced by Hammersmith and Fulham.

== History ==
Somewhat less affluent than its West London neighbour Chelsea, Fulham nevertheless was predominantly a safe Conservative seat in its first incarnation between 1885-1918, aside from a brief period of Liberal representation between 1906-1910.

Fulham was then divided into two constituencies (East and West), which were initially Conservative until Labour started gradually reducing the majorities in both seats, firstly gaining Fulham East in a by-election in 1933, then Fulham West in another by-election in 1938, eventually holding both seats from 1945 until Fulham became a single constituency again in 1955.

The Labour Party held the seat until 1979, when the Conservative Party gained Fulham in Margaret Thatcher's first administration, the first time they had represented the area since the Second World War, as the area became increasingly gentrified and more inclined to the Conservatives, although Labour gained the seat in a 1986 by-election. The Conservatives regained the seat in the following year's General Election and held the seat until 1997, when the Fulham constituency was abolished, becoming part of the new Hammersmith and Fulham constituency, gained by Labour in their landslide victory under Tony Blair.

== Boundaries ==
1885–1918: The parish of Fulham.

1955–1974: The Metropolitan Borough of Fulham wards of Hurlingham, Munster, Sands End, Town, and Walham.

1974–1983: The London Borough of Hammersmith wards of Avonmore, Colehill, Crabtree, Gibbs Green, Helford, Margravine, Parsons Green, Sandford, Sherbrooke, Sulivan, and Town.

1983–1997: The London Borough of Hammersmith and Fulham wards of Avonmore, Colehill, Crabtree, Eel Brook, Gibbs Green, Margravine, Normand, Palace, Sands End, Sherbrooke, Sulivan, Town, and Walham.

== Members of Parliament ==
=== MPs 1885–1918 ===
Election	Member	Party
1885	William Fisher	Conservative
1906	Timothy Davies	Liberal
1910	William Fisher	Conservative
1918	constituency abolished: see Fulham East and Fulham West	

=== MPs 1955–1997 ===
Election	Member	Party
1955	Michael Stewart	Labour
1979	Martin Stevens (Note: died 1986)	Conservative
1986 by-election	Nick Raynsford	Labour
1987	Matthew Carrington	Conservative
1997	constituency abolished: see Hammersmith and Fulham	

== Elections ==
=== Elections in the 1880s ===
General election 1885: Fulham
Party	Candidate	Votes	%	±%
Conservative	William Fisher	2,642	50.5	
Liberal	George W. E. Russell	2,590	49.5	
Majority		52	1.0	
Turnout		5,232	80.5	
Registered electors		6,499		
Conservative win (new seat)				

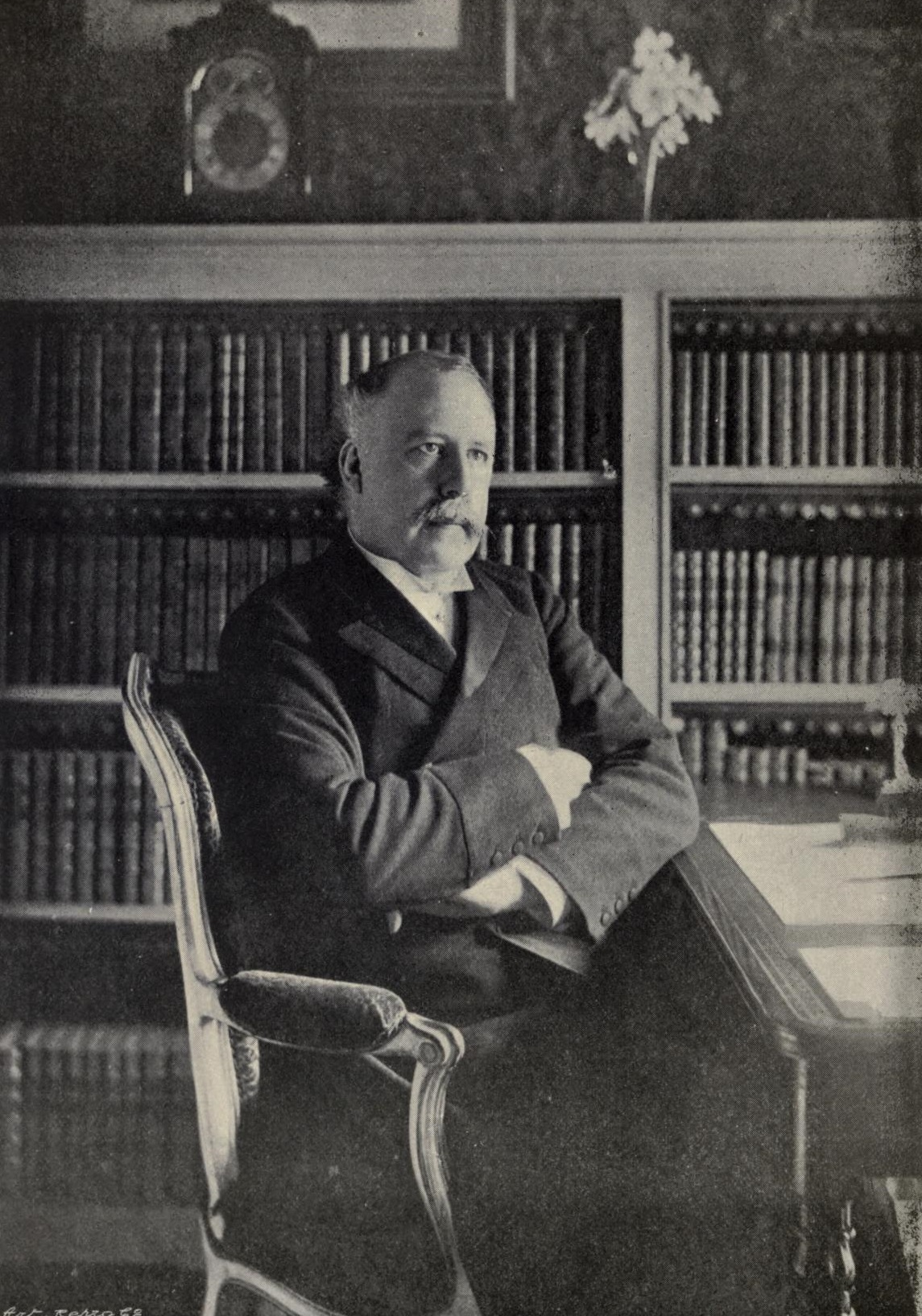
Russell

General election 1886: Fulham
Party	Candidate	Votes	%	±%
Conservative	William Fisher	2,557	53.2	+2.7
Liberal	George W. E. Russell	2,247	46.8	−2.7
Majority		310	6.4	+5.4
Turnout		4,804	73.9	−6.6
Registered electors		6,499		
Conservative hold		Swing	+2.7	

=== Elections in the 1890s ===
General election 1892: Fulham
Party	Candidate	Votes	%	±%
Conservative	William Fisher	4,365	51.2	−2.0
Liberal	William David Barnett	4,154	48.8	+2.0
Majority		211	2.4	−4.0
Turnout		8,519	75.6	+1.7
Registered electors		11,266		
Conservative hold		Swing	-2.0	

Cornwall

General election 1895: Fulham
Party	Candidate	Votes	%	±%
Conservative	William Fisher	5,378	56.7	+5.5
Liberal	Edwin Cornwall	3,915	41.2	−7.6
Ind. Labour Party	William Parnell	196	2.1	New
Majority		1,463	15.5	+13.1
Turnout		9,489	74.6	−1.0
Registered electors		12,716		
Conservative hold		Swing	+6.6	

=== Elections in the 1900s ===
Fisher

General election 1900: Fulham
Party	Candidate	Votes	%	±%
Conservative	William Fisher	6,541	60.6	+3.9
Liberal	Edwin Cornwall	4,247	39.4	−1.8
Majority		2,294	21.2	+5.7
Turnout		10,788	65.0	−9.6
Registered electors		16,600		
Conservative hold		Swing	+2.8	

Davies

General election 1906: Fulham
Party	Candidate	Votes	%	±%
Liberal	Timothy Davies	8,037	52.0	+12.6
Conservative	William Fisher	7,407	48.0	−12.6
Majority		630	4.0	N/A
Turnout		15,444	74.9	+9.9
Registered electors		20,620		
Liberal gain from Conservative		Swing	+12.6	

=== Elections in the 1910s ===
Hemphill

General election January 1910: Fulham
Party	Candidate	Votes	%	±%
Conservative	William Fisher	9,690	55.5	+7.5
Liberal	Fitzroy Hemphill	7,761	44.5	−7.5
Majority		1,929	11.0	N/A
Turnout		17,451	83.1	+8.2
Conservative gain from Liberal		Swing	+7.5	

General election December 1910: Fulham
Party	Candidate	Votes	%	±%
Conservative	William Fisher	8,252	55.8	+0.3
Liberal	Sylvain Mayer	6,526	44.2	−0.3
Majority		1,726	11.6	+0.6
Turnout		14,778	70.3	
Conservative hold		Swing	+0.3	

1917 Fulham by-election
Party	Candidate	Votes	%	±%
Unionist	William Fisher	Unopposed		
Unionist hold				

=== Elections in the 1950s ===
General election 1955: Fulham
Party	Candidate	Votes	%	±%
Labour	Michael Stewart	23,972	55.04	
Conservative	Mabel Lilian de la Motte	19,578	44.96	
Majority		4,394	10.08	
Turnout		43,550	78.65	
Labour win				

General election 1959: Fulham
Party	Candidate	Votes	%	±%
Labour	Michael Stewart	21,525	53.67	
Conservative	Mabel Lilian de la Motte	18,581	46.33	
Majority		2,944	7.34	
Turnout		40,106	77.00	
Labour hold		Swing		

=== Elections in the 1960s ===
General election 1964: Fulham
Party	Candidate	Votes	%	±%
Labour	Michael Stewart	19,788	56.11	
Conservative	Michael Grylls	14,842	42.09	
Patriotic Party	Arthur Rossi Braybrooke	632	1.80	New
Majority		4,946	14.26	
Turnout		35,262	73.2	
Labour hold		Swing		

General election 1966: Fulham
Party	Candidate	Votes	%	±%
Labour	Michael Stewart	20,080	58.31	
Conservative	Michael Grylls	13,094	38.03	
Independent Liberal	Elisa Sheriff	716	2.08	New
Communist	Peter Robson	256	0.74	New
Radical Alliance	Pat Arrowsmith	163	0.47	New
Patriotic Party	Arthur Rossi Braybrooke	126	0.37	−1.43
Majority		6,986	20.28	
Turnout		34,435	76.38	
Labour hold		Swing		

=== Elections in the 1970s ===
General election 1970: Fulham
Party	Candidate	Votes	%	±%
Labour	Michael Stewart	16,312	55.0	−3.3
Conservative	Ian Mactaggart	12,807	43.2	+5.2
Radical Alliance	Pat Arrowsmith	421	1.4	+0.9
Anti-Election	Roger Moody	112	0.4	New
Majority		3,505	11.8	−8.5
Turnout		29,652	68.8	−7.6
Labour hold		Swing		

General election February 1974: Fulham
Party	Candidate	Votes	%	±%
Labour	Michael Stewart	20,995	46.13	
Conservative	Martin Stevens	17,446	38.33	
Liberal	Gerald Arthur Dowden	6,105	13.41	
National Front	H Smithies	966	2.12	New
Majority		3,549	7.80	
Turnout		45,512	78.53	
Labour hold		Swing		

General election October 1974: Fulham
Party	Candidate	Votes	%	±%
Labour	Michael Stewart	20,616	49.87	
Conservative	Martin Stevens	15,295	37.00	
Liberal	GA Dowden	4,577	11.07	
National Front	J Cordrey	855	2.07	
Majority		5,321	12.87	
Turnout		41,343	71.44	
Labour hold		Swing		

General election 1979: Fulham
Party	Candidate	Votes	%	±%
Conservative	Martin Stevens	20,249	46.68	
Labour	Barrington Stead	18,750	43.22	
Liberal	David Rendel	3,882	8.95	
National Front	R Pearce	478	0.99	
Majority		1,499	3.46	
Turnout		43,359	76.05	
Conservative gain from Labour		Swing		

=== Elections in the 1980s ===
General election 1983: Fulham
Party	Candidate	Votes	%	±%
Conservative	Martin Stevens	18,204	46.18	−0.52
Labour	Anthony Powell	13,415	34.03	−9.19
Liberal	David Rendel	9,174	18.25	+9.30
Ecology	Janet Grimes	277	0.70	New
National Front	R Pearce	229	0.58	−0.57
Independent Liberal	J Keats	102	0.26	New
Majority		4,798	12.15	+8.69
Turnout		39,421	76.05	−0.03
Conservative hold		Swing		

1986 Fulham by-election
Party	Candidate	Votes	%	±%
Labour	Nick Raynsford	16,451	43.20	+9.17
Conservative	Matthew Carrington	12,948	34.00	−12.18
SDP	Roger Liddle	6,953	18.26	+0.01
England Demands Repatriation	Jane Birdwood	226	0.59	New
Monster Raving Loony	David Sutch	134	0.35	New
Connoisseur Wine Party	John Creighton	127	0.33	New
Democratic Rights for Northern Ireland	James Black	98	0.26	New
Fellowship	Geoffrey Rolph	39	0.1	New
Humanist	Jon Swinden	38	0.1	New
Captain Rainbows Universal Party	Liza Duke	37	0.1	New
All Party Anti-Common Market	Reginald Simmerson	33	0.09	New
Majority		3,503	9.20	N/A
Turnout		38,084		
Labour gain from Conservative		Swing		

General election 1987: Fulham
Party	Candidate	Votes	%	±%
Conservative	Matthew Carrington	21,752	51.78	+5.60
Labour	Nick Raynsford	15,430	36.73	+2.70
SDP	Paul Marshall	4,365	10.39	−7.86
Green	Janet Grimes	465	1.11	+0.41
Majority		6,322	15.05	+2.90
Turnout		42,012	77.09	+1.04
Conservative hold		Swing		

=== Elections in the 1990s ===
General election 1992: Fulham
Party	Candidate	Votes	%	±%
Conservative	Matthew Carrington	21,438	53.4	+1.6
Labour	Nick P. Moore	14,859	37.0	+0.3
Liberal Democrats	Peter M. Crystal	3,339	8.3	−2.1
Green	Elizabeth G.A. Streeter	443	1.1	0.0
Natural Law	John V. Darby	91	0.2	New
Majority		6,579	16.4	+1.4
Turnout		40,170	75.9	−1.2
Conservative hold		Swing	+0.7	
