= Batyr Bazarov =

Turkmen politician

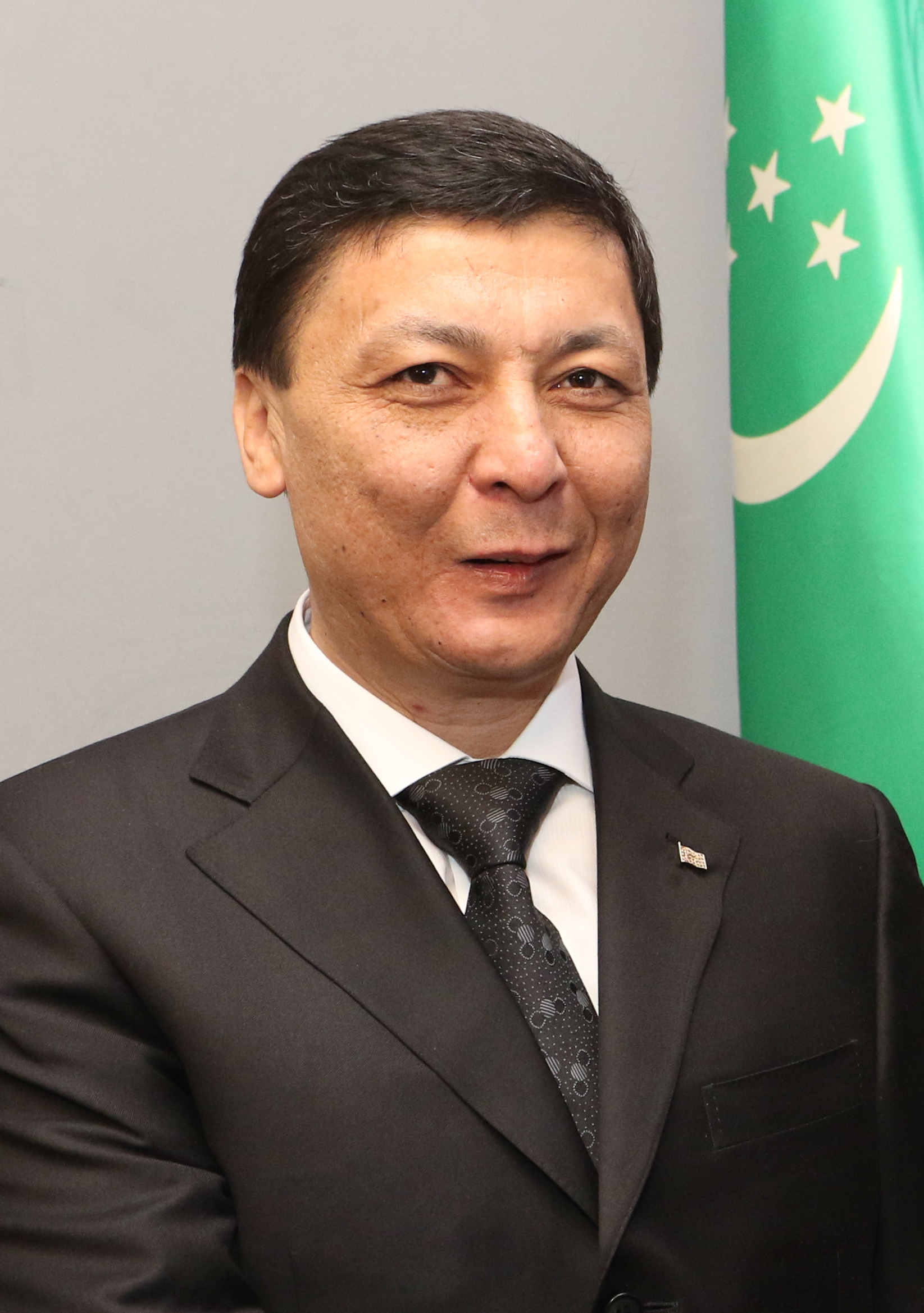
Batyr Bazarov in 2018.

Batyr Bazarov (born 1976) is a Turkmenistani politician. He served as Minister of Finance and Economy from 2017 to 2020.
