= Ministry of Finance (Turkmenistan) =

Government ministry of Turkmenistan

Ministry of Finance and Economy of Turkmenistan
- Türkmenistanyň Maliýe we Ykdysadyýet Ministirligi

Agency overview
- Formed: 2008
- Superseding agency: Ministry of Economy and Finance of Turkmenistan
- Jurisdiction: President of Turkmenistan
- Headquarters: Bldg. 156, Archabil Avenue, Ashgabat
- Minister responsible: Serdar Achyldurdyyevich Jorayyev
- Website: fineconomic.gov.tm

The Ministry of Finance and Economy of Turkmenistan (Türkmenistanyň Maliýe we Ykdysadyýet Ministrligi) is the central government institution charged with leading the financial policy of Turkmenistan. It was established in 1991, and reformed in 2008. In 2017, it was merged again with the ministry of economy. The current Minister of Finance and Economy is Serdar Jorayyev.

== Ministers of Finance and Economy ==
- Amangeldi Bayramov, May 1992 - July 1993
- Muhammad Abalakov, July 1993 - April 1995
- Valeri Otchertsov, April 1995 - August 1996
- Matkarim Rajapov, August 1996 - September 2000
- Orazmurad Bekmuradov, September 2000 - November 2001
- Enejan Ataýewa, November 2001 - November 2002
- Yazkuli Kakaliev, November 2002 - April 2004
- Bibitach Vekilova, April 2004 - March 2005
- Jumaniyaz Annaorazov, March 2005 - May 2005
- Amandurdi Muradkuliev, May 2005 - September 2005
- Atamurad Berdiýew, December 2005 - September 2006
- Khodjamyrat Geldimyradov, February 2007 - April 2008
- Annamuhammet Gochiev, April 2008 - July 2011
- Dovletgeldi Sadykov, July 2011 - July 2014
- Muhammedguli Muhammedov, July 2014 - July 2017
- Gochmurad Muradov, July 2017 - October 2017
- Batyr Bazarov, October 2017 - February 2020
- Ezizgeldi Annamuhammedov, February 2020 - July 2020
- Muhammetgeldi Serdarov, July 2020 - February 2023
- Serdar Achyldurdyyevich Jorayyev, February 2023

== See also ==
- Economy of Turkmenistan
