= Roger Liddle, Baron Liddle =

British political adviser and consultant (born 1947)

The Right Honourable The Lord Liddle
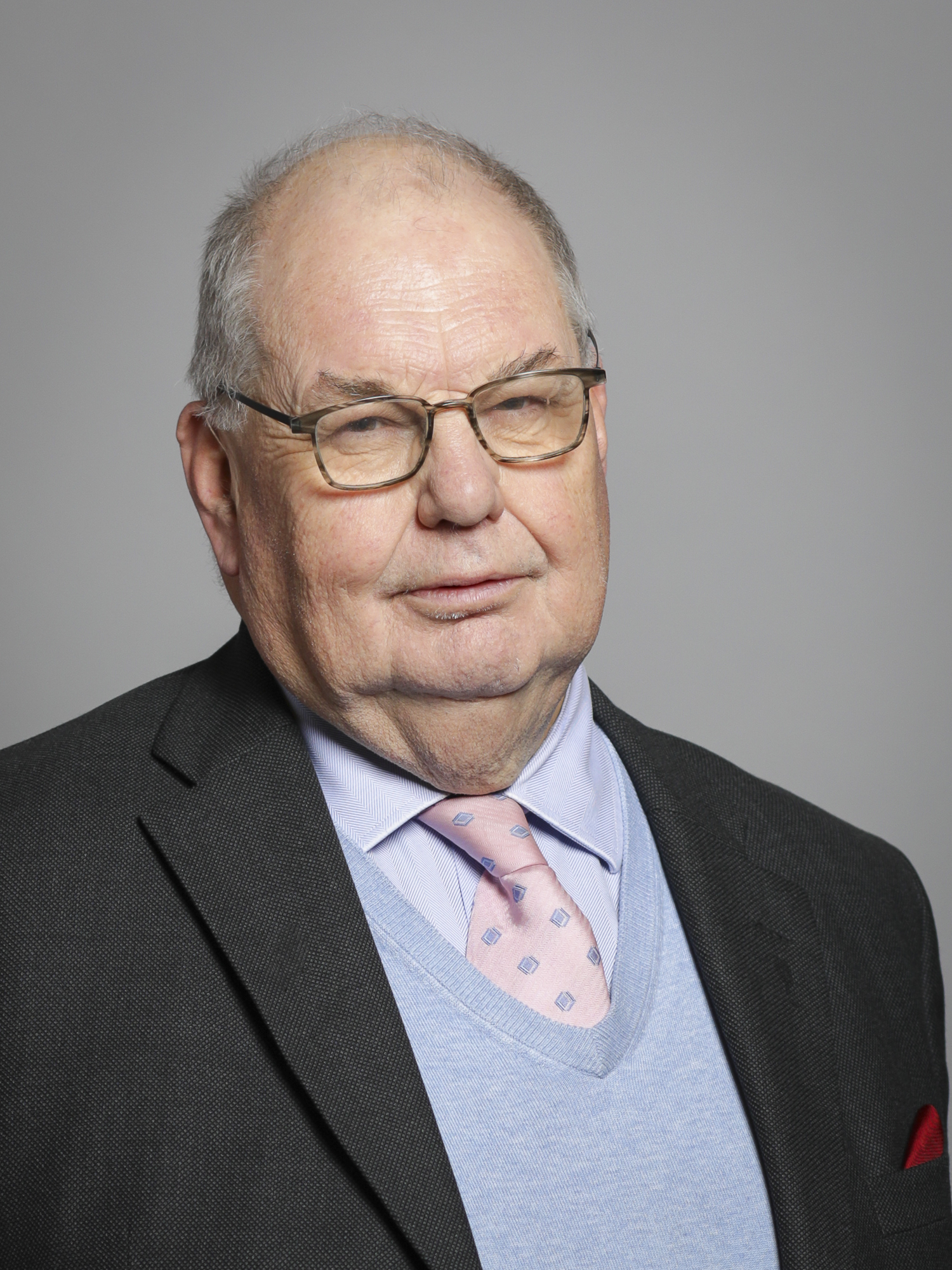
- Born: Roger John Liddle; 14 June 1947 (age 79); Carlisle, Cumberland, England
- Education: Carlisle Grammar School
- Alma mater: The Queen's College, Oxford
- Political party: Labour (1964–81; since 1995); SDP (1981–88); Liberal Democrats (1988–95)
- Spouse: Caroline Thomson (m. 1983)

Member of the House of Lords
- Lord Temporal
- Life peerage 19 June 2010

Roger John Liddle, Baron Liddle (born 14 June 1947) is a British political adviser and consultant who is principally known for being Special Adviser on European matters to the former Prime Minister Tony Blair, and President of the European Commission, José Manuel Barroso. He also worked together with Peter Mandelson on books outlining the political philosophy of the Labour Party under Blair's leadership. He is the chair of Progressive Britain, the successor organisation to the international think tank Policy Network and Progress, and was Pro-Chancellor of Lancaster University until 2020.

In December 2021, Liddle was awarded an Honorary Doctorate by Lancaster University.

== Family ==
Liddle was the son of John Thwaites Liddle and Elizabeth née Temple. Born on 14 June 1947 in Carlisle, he attended Carlisle Grammar School. and gained the Wyndham Scholarship at The Queen's College, Oxford, where he gained degrees in Modern History and Management Studies. In 1983 he married the Hon. Caroline Thomson – daughter of Lord Thomson of Monifieth, former Labour Member of Parliament for Dundee East, Cabinet minister and European Commissioner. She was chief operating officer of the BBC, until she was made redundant in 2011 amidst controversy over the selection of a new BBC Director General.

== Early career ==
After completing his university studies, Liddle worked in research for the Oxford School of Social and Administrative Studies and as an industrial relations officer for The Electricity Council. A member of the Labour Party since he was a teenager, in 1976 he moved into politics by becoming Special Adviser to William Rodgers, Secretary of State for Transport, during the government of James Callaghan. In 1981, he and Rodgers left Labour to become founder members of the Social Democratic Party (SDP), serving on the party's national committee until 1986.

Following the demise of the SDP in 1988, Liddle followed the majority of its members into the Liberal Democrats, remaining a party member and Lambeth councillor until his announcement in 1995 that he had decided to defect back to Labour, largely because he believed that the party's leadership under Tony Blair offered "the last, best hope for constructive engagement in Europe and realistic acceptance of Britain's only future destiny."

Away from politics, Liddle became Director of the Public Policy Centre in 1982, undertaking work on the regulation of privatised industries, exchange rate policy, regional policy, science and industrial policy, employee participation and wage determination, and choice in public services. He then moved into the private sector for 10 years, taking the position of managing director of Prima Europe Ltd, a strategy consultancy company which advised on the impact of political and regulatory developments at European and national levels.

== Government ==
In 1997, Liddle moved back into front-line politics to become Special Adviser on European matters to Tony Blair, now the new Prime Minister. During a seven-year spell in this role he developed a new UK policy of positive engagement in the European Union, focusing on economic reform, innovation and enterprise promotion; modernisation of Welfare States and labour market reform; as well as institutional issues, the Constitutional Treaty, and European Defence. He was also responsible for liaison with business and trade unions on European issues.

Advancing from Number 10, he became a Member of the Cabinet of the European Union Trade Commissioner, where he advised on EU policy and their impact on the UK. In 2006 he moved on to become Principal Adviser to the President of the European Commission, leading a team of economists and experts in the Bureau of European Policy Advisers advising on the economic and social challenges facing Europe. He is also former chair of the UK government's New Industry, New Jobs, Universities and Skills advisory panel, which reported directly to Peter Mandelson, who was then Secretary of State for Business, Innovation and Skills.

== After Government ==
Liddle is currently chairman of Policy Network – an international think tank bringing together academics, policymakers and politicians across the progressive centre left; responsible for major projects on the future of the European Social Model, public service reform, immigration and integration, flexicurity, and globalisation and social justice. He is a visiting fellow of the European Institute at the London School of Economics.

Liddle became a member of the Labour Party-associated Progress strategy board in 2017.

== Peerage ==
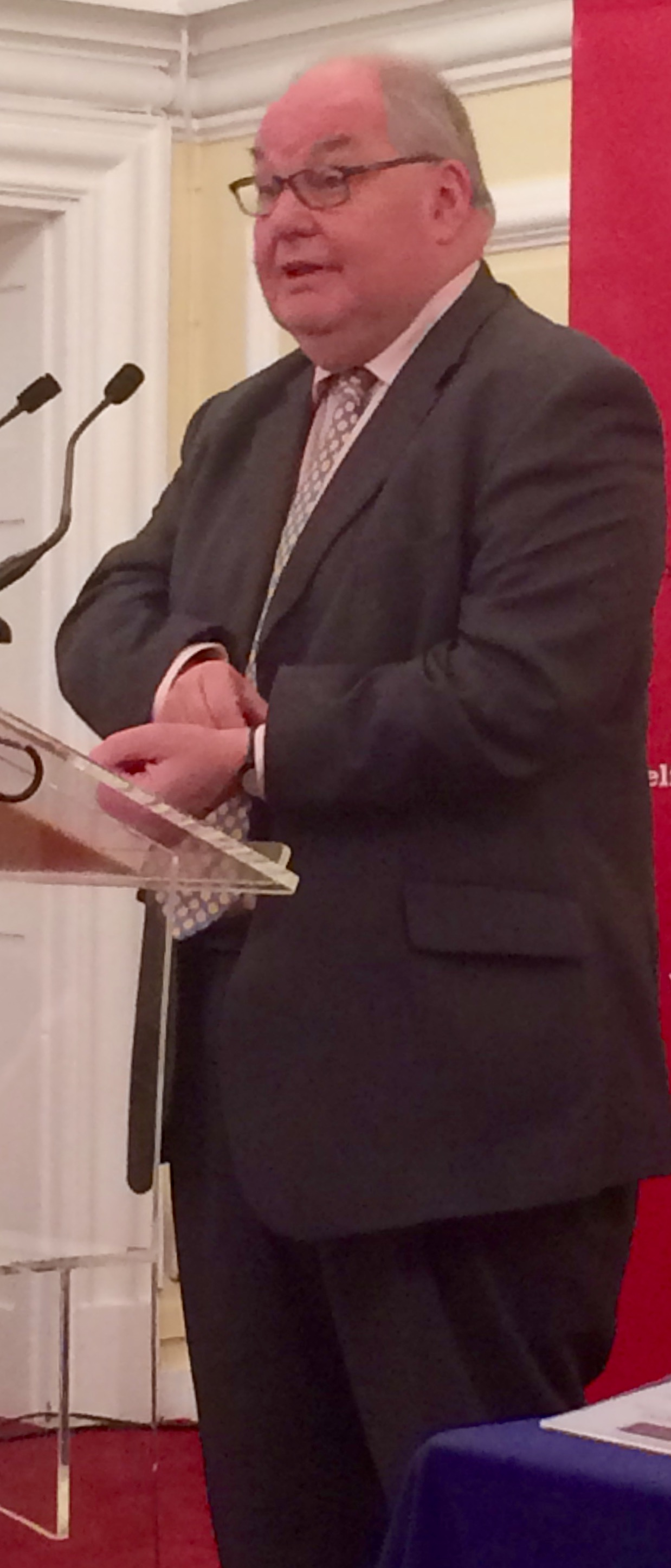
Liddle at Central Hall Westminster in 2015

It was announced that Liddle would be awarded a peerage in the 2010 Dissolution Honours List. He was created a life peer on 19 June 2010 as Baron Liddle, of Carlisle in the County of Cumbria, and was introduced in the House of Lords on 21 June 2010, supported by Peter Mandelson and Lord Rodgers of Quarry Bank.

== Political participation ==
Liddle has also played a direct role in elected politics, firstly as a Labour councillor for Headington ward on Oxford City Council (1971–76), and then by representing Princes ward on Lambeth London Borough Council, originally for the SDP (1982–86) and then for the Liberal Democrats (1994–95). In 2013, he was elected to Cumbria County Council for the Wigton Division, remaining in situ until his retirement in 2023. He also unsuccessfully contested two Parliamentary elections for the SDP (Vauxhall at the 1983 general election and Fulham at a by-election in 1986) and one for the Liberal Democrats (North Hertfordshire at the 1992 general election).

== Publications ==
Liddle has written four books, all focusing firmly on European issues. Most recently Global Europe, Social Europe with Anthony Giddens and Patrick Diamond. Together with Peter Mandelson he wrote The Blair Revolution: Can New Labour Deliver? in 1996. His thoughts on the future of Europe, made during his time in the commission, were published in a Fabian Ideas pamphlet in 2005.

- Challenging the politics of evasion: the only way to renew European social democracy, Policy Network, December 2009,
- After the crisis: A new socio-economic settlement for the EU, Policy Network, November 2009.
- Beyond New Labour: the future of social democracy in Britain, Politicos, 2009.
- Building a low-carbon future: the politics of climate change, Policy Network, June 2007
- Social pessimism: the new social reality of Europe, Policy Network, October 2008.
- Progressive governance 2008: the path to a global progressive consensus, April 2008
- Creating a culture of fairness: a progressive response to income inequality in Britain, January 2008
- A new social Europe, September 2007
- The social reality of Europe, March 2007
- Global Europe Social Europe, October 2006
- Economic Reform in Europe: Priorities for the next five years, November 2004

Orders of precedence in the United Kingdom
Preceded by The Lord Willis of Knaresborough	Gentlemen; Baron Liddle	Followed by The Lord Deben
