= Hammersmith and Fulham (constituency) =

UK Parliament constituency (1997–2010)

Coordinates: 51.48°N 0.21°W

- Former borough constituency for the House of Commons
- Boundary of Hammersmith and Fulham in Greater London for the 2005 general election
- County: Greater London

1997–2010
- Seats: One
- Created from: Fulham, Hammersmith
- Replaced by: Chelsea and Fulham, Hammersmith

Hammersmith and Fulham was a constituency represented in the House of Commons of the Parliament of the United Kingdom. It elected one Member of Parliament (MP) by the first past the post system of election. The constituency was abolished at the 2010 general election with its wards being split between two new constituencies of Chelsea and Fulham & Hammersmith.

== Boundaries ==
The constituency was created in 1997 from parts of the former seats of Hammersmith & Fulham. It covered the central and southern portions of the London Borough of Hammersmith and Fulham, including the town centres of both Hammersmith and Fulham, but also included smaller districts such as West Kensington, Brook Green, Barons Court, and Sands End.

The constituency was made up of the electoral wards of:

- Addison; Avonmore; Broadway; Brook Green; Colehill; Crabtree; Eel Brook; Gibbs Green; Grove; Margravine; Normand; Palace; Ravenscourt; Sands End; Sherbrooke; Sulivan; Town; Walham.

=== Boundary review ===
Following their review of parliamentary representation in North London, the Boundary Commission for England's boundary changes which took effect at the 2010 general election erased the Hammersmith and Fulham constituency.

Two new constituencies of Chelsea and Fulham & Hammersmith took Hammersmith and Fulham's electoral wards. The Chelsea and Fulham seat is a cross-border creation.

== History ==
This highly marginal constituency was represented by only two MPs during its 13-year existence. Iain Coleman won the seat for the Labour Party on its creation in 1997. He narrowly held the seat in 2001, but did not seek a third term as its MP in 2005 due to ill health. On that occasion Greg Hands gained the seat for the Conservative Party, and held it until its abolition in 2010 when he was elected for the new seat of Chelsea and Fulham.

== Members of Parliament ==
Election	Member	Party
1997	Iain Coleman	Labour
2005	Greg Hands	Conservative
2010	constituency abolished: see Chelsea and Fulham & Hammersmith	

== Elections ==
=== Elections in the 2000s ===
General election 2005: Hammersmith and Fulham
Party	Candidate	Votes	%	±%
Conservative	Greg Hands	22,407	45.4	+5.6
Labour	Melanie Smallman	17,378	35.2	−9.1
Liberal Democrats	Alan Bullion	7,116	14.4	+2.6
Green	Fiona Harrold	1,933	3.9	+0.7
UKIP	Giles Fisher	493	1.0	+0.2
Majority		5,029	10.2	N/A
Turnout		49,327	62.4	+6.0
Conservative gain from Labour		Swing	+7.3	

General election 2001: Hammersmith and Fulham
Party	Candidate	Votes	%	±%
Labour	Iain Coleman	19,801	44.3	−2.5
Conservative	Matthew Carrington	17,786	39.8	+0.2
Liberal Democrats	Jon Burden	5,294	11.8	+3.0
Green	Daniel Dias	1,444	3.2	+2.2
UKIP	Gerald Roberts	375	0.8	+0.5
Majority		2,015	4.5	−2.7
Turnout		44,700	56.4	−12.3
Labour hold		Swing		

=== Elections in the 1990s ===
General election 1997: Hammersmith and Fulham
Party	Candidate	Votes	%	±%
Labour	Iain Coleman	25,262	46.8	
Conservative	Matthew Carrington	21,420	39.6	
Liberal Democrats	Alexi Sugden	4,727	8.8	
Referendum	Moyra Bremner	1,023	1.9	New
New Labour	William Johnson-Smith	695	1.3	New
Green	Elizabeth Streeter	562	1.0	New
UKIP	Gerald Roberts	183	0.3	New
Natural Law	Alexander Phillips	79	0.1	New
Care in the Community	Andrew Elston	74	0.1	New
Majority		3,842	7.2	N/A
Turnout		54,025	68.7	
Labour gain from Conservative		Swing	+10.1	

== See also ==
- List of parliamentary constituencies in London
