= Iain Coleman =

British politician (1958–2025)

Member of Parliament for Hammersmith and Fulham
- In office 1 May 1997 – 11 April 2005
- Preceded by: Constituency Established
- Succeeded by: Greg Hands

Personal details
- Born: 18 January 1958 London, England
- Died: 20 September 2025 (aged 67)
- Party: Labour
- Spouse: Sally Powell (m. 1996)
- Relations: Neale Coleman (brother)
- Children: 1

Iain Clifford Coleman (18 January 1958 – 20 September 2025) was a British Labour politician who was Member of Parliament for Hammersmith and Fulham in London from 1997 to 2005. He was elected as a councillor in the London Borough of Hammersmith and Fulham for Shepherd's Bush Green ward in May 2010.

== Background ==
Coleman was born in London on 18 January 1958. He was educated at Tonbridge School. Coleman worked as a local government officer in the London Boroughs of Ealing and Islington. His mother and brother, Neale Coleman, were councillors in Barnet and Westminster respectively.

== Political career ==
Coleman was a councillor on Hammersmith and Fulham Council from 1986 to 1997, serving as Leader from 1991 to 1996 and Mayor from 1996 to 1997. He was elected to represent Avonmore ward in 1986, alongside his wife, Sally Powell. The ward's two seats were gained from the Conservatives. When Chief Whip of the Labour Group, he resigned over service cuts. Coleman latterly represented Gibbs Green ward, and stood down following his election to parliament.

Coleman was first elected as an MP at the 1997 general election, and retained the highly marginal seat at the 2001 general election.

He announced on 14 March 2005 that he would be standing down due to ill health. Melanie Smallman was subsequently selected by the local Constituency Labour Party to replace him as the party's candidate, but was unsuccessful in her election bid, losing to Greg Hands of the Conservative Party. Coleman subsequently stood for Labour in the May 2006 local election for the North End ward, but failed to gain a seat, the Conservatives making a clean sweep of the ward. However, he was elected as a councillor for Shepherds Bush Green ward at the May 2010 local elections.

== Personal life and death ==
Coleman was married to Sally Powell from 1996 onwards, formerly a senior Labour councillor in Hammersmith and Fulham, as well as a NEC member; they had one son, Jack Coleman. He was a keen Arsenal supporter. His health declined in later years after multiple strokes. Coleman died on 20 September 2025, aged 67.

Parliament of the United Kingdom
New constituency	Member of Parliament for Hammersmith and Fulham; 1997–2005	Succeeded by Greg Hands
