= Hayes Fisher, 1st Baron Downham =

British politician

The Right Honourable The Lord Downham PC KStJ

President of the Local Government Board
- In office 28 June 1917 – 4 November 1918
- Monarch: George V
- Prime Minister: H. H. Asquith; David Lloyd George
- Preceded by: Walter Long
- Succeeded by: Auckland Geddes

Chancellor of the Duchy of Lancaster
- In office 4 November 1918 – 10 January 1919
- Monarch: George V
- Prime Minister: David Lloyd George
- Preceded by: The Lord Beaverbrook
- Succeeded by: The Earl of Crawford

Minister of Information
- In office 4 November 1918 – 10 January 1919
- Monarch: George V
- Prime Minister: David Lloyd George
- Preceded by: The Lord Beaverbrook
- Succeeded by: Office abolished

Personal details
- Born: 18 March 1853 Downham, Isle of Ely. Cambridgeshire
- Died: 2 July 1920 (aged 67) 13 Buckingham Palace Gardens, London
- Party: Conservative
- Spouse: Florence Fisher (d. 1923)
- Children: The Hon. Rachel Fisher
- Education: University College, Oxford

William Hayes Fisher, 1st Baron Downham, PC, KStJ (1853 – 2 July 1920) was a British Conservative Party politician. He held office as President of the Local Government Board and Minister of Information in David Lloyd George's First World War coalition government.

== Background and education ==
Born at Downham, (known now as 'Little Downham') in the Isle of Ely, Fisher was the son of Reverend Frederick Fisher, rector of that parish, and Mary, daughter of William Hayes. He was educated at Haileybury and University College, Oxford, and was called to the Bar, Inner Temple, in 1879.

== Political career ==
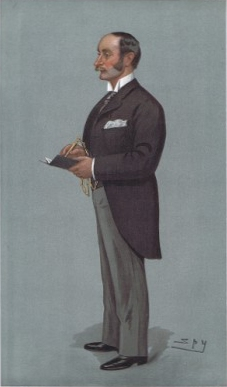
"Fulham" – Fisher as caricatured by Spy (Leslie Ward) in Vanity Fair, May 1900

Fisher was elected to the House of Commons for Fulham in 1885, a seat he held until 1906. He was private secretary Sir Michael Hicks Beach between 1886 and 1887 and to Arthur Balfour between 1887 and 1892 (who both served as Chief Secretary for Ireland at the time). In 1896 he was appointed a Junior Lord of the Treasury (government whip) in the Conservative administration of Lord Salisbury, a post he held until August 1902, and then served under Arthur Balfour as Financial Secretary to the Treasury from 11 August 1902 to April 1903, when he resigned as a result of his connection with a financial syndicate. He lost his Fulham seat at the 1906 general election but successfully reclaimed it at the January 1910 general election. The following year he was sworn of the Privy Council.

Fisher returned to the government as Parliamentary Secretary to the Local Government Board in May 1915 in the newly formed coalition government led by H. H. Asquith. He retained this post also when David Lloyd George became Prime Minister in December 1916, but in June 1917 he was promoted to President of the Local Government Board with a seat in the cabinet. In November 1918 he was made Chancellor of the Duchy of Lancaster and Minister of Information, and a few days later he was raised to the peerage as Baron Downham, of Fulham in the County of London on 16 November. However, he stepped down from the government already in January 1919. Apart from his career in national politics, Fisher was an Alderman of the London County Council between 1907 and 1913 and its chairman in 1919.

== Family ==
Lord Downham married Florence, daughter of H. Fisher, in 1895. They had one daughter, the Hon. Rachel Fisher.

He died at his home, 13 Buckingham Palace Gardens, London, in July 1920, when the barony became extinct. Lady Downham died in August 1923.

Parliament of the United Kingdom
New constituency	Member of Parliament for Fulham; 1885–1906	Succeeded by Timothy Davies
Preceded by Timothy Davies	Member of Parliament for Fulham; January 1910–1918	Constituency abolished
Political offices
Preceded by Austen Chamberlain	Financial Secretary to the Treasury; 1902–1903	Succeeded by Hon. Arthur Elliot
Preceded by Alfred Fowell Buxton	Chairman of the Finance Committee of London County Council; 1907–1911	Succeeded by Ronald Collet Norman
Preceded by Herbert Lewis	Parliamentary Secretary to the Local Government Board; 1915–1917	Succeeded by Stephen Walsh
Preceded by Walter Long	President of the Local Government Board; 1917–1918	Succeeded by Auckland Geddes
Preceded by The Lord Beaverbrook	Chancellor of the Duchy of Lancaster; 1918–1919	Succeeded by The Earl of Crawford
Preceded by The Lord Beaverbrook	Minister of Information; 1918–1919	Office abolished
Preceded by Ronald Collet Norman	Chairman of the London County Council; 1919 – 1920	Succeeded by John Gilbert
Peerage of the United Kingdom
New creation	Baron Downham; 1918–1920	Extinct
