= Operation Sassoon =

Plan for the evacuation of London, England

Operation Sassoon was a plan developed circa 2004 by the British government for the emergency evacuation plan of any part of London in the case of a major emergency, such as a terrorist attack, including planning for the accomodation and support of evacuees in the Home Counties.

== Overview ==
The London Resilience Forum approved the original version of the plan in July 2003. In April 2005, it published its Strategic Emergency Plan, including a section with an overview of Operation Sassoon, based on the 2003 framework plan. A later version of the Strategic Emergency Plan, in 2007, continued to refer to Operation Sassoon as a name for the "London Evacuation Plan", with a brief summary, but the plan itself was confidential.

Under the 2005 plan, large-scale evacuation would be carried out via existing National Rail and Transport for London networks. Buses would shuttle passengers from loading hubs in the city to more distant sites in the outer city, potentially the termini of existing routes. Rail services would switch to an emergency evacuation service from "rail hubs" at central termini towards external railheads, which would be stations in outer London and in the home counties. Trains would then return empty to continue the evacuation. No passengers would be taken into the city, and any inbound trains would be unloaded at the first available station. A police presence at the hub stations was expected to be needed for crowd control.

London Underground services would be closed off through the "suspended area", and would shuttle passengers to the outer railheads from inner stations where trains could be turned around. Services were expected to be operating at no better than off-peak rates.The area would be closed to air transport. Finally, it was not anticipated that ferry services would provide significant evacuation capacity, but that they mmight play a role in certain specific areas such as Canary Wharf.

Private vehicles would be directed to "High Capacity Emergency Access Routes", primarily motorways, providing a route out of London for self-evacuation by car, and access for inbound emergency services sent from outside London. Police would be used to control access to the motorways and enforce road closures.

Once evacuees had arrived at railheads, their transfer to evacuation shelters would be the responsibilty of local authorities. The initial facilities were expected to be "'airport delay' style" for up to 48 hours - basic sitting accomodation with drinking water and toilet facilities - with an acknowledgement that expected standards for evacuation during major incidents would not have to be followed in these circumstances.

== History ==
The first public reports of the plan came in September 2003, alongside a major incident exercise on the London Underground.

In September 2004, the detailed Metropolitan Police plans for traffic management during Operation Sassoon evacuations were leaked to the Sunday Express, having been accidentally left on a train. They detailed that drivers would be routed out of the city via motorways, with emergency road signs already produced and held in readiness. Other parts of the document identified a number of potential railway evacuation centres outside the M25, including six sites in Surrey, and four towns along the railway line to Brighton in Sussex. While planning was carried out by local governments, the costs would be borne by central government under the Bellwin scheme. Military support was expected, both from the regular services and from the reserve Civil Contingencies Reaction Force. The government confirmed the existence of the plan in a written statement in October 2004.

The Sunday Express reports, which had included headlines such as "Six million will be left behind to die", were challenged by John Prescott, then both Deputy Prime Minister and the responsible minister for local government, both on the grounds of sensationalism and that the leaked documents were only a small part of the overall plan. The government also noted that detailed evacuation plans had yet to be finalised at the time of the report. The Press Complaints Commission declined the complaint.

The plan was never put into practice, though some elements were used in the reponse to the 7 July 2005 London bombings, where tube trains were used to shuttle passengers to outer stations.
