= List of people from the London Borough of Hillingdon =

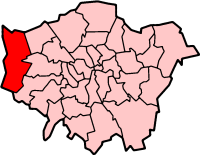
Location of the London Borough of Hillingdon within London

This list of people from the London Borough of Hillingdon includes residents who were either born or dwelt for a substantial period within the borders of this modern London borough, formed in 1965 by the amalgamation of Hayes and Harlington Urban District, the Municipal Borough of Uxbridge, Ruislip-Northwood Urban District and Yiewsley and West Drayton Urban District in West London. The 2001 census recorded the population of Hillingdon as 243,006.

== Notable residents ==
=== Academia and research ===
- Stuart Olof Agrell (1913–1996), optical mineralogist renowned for his involvement in the Apollo programme, was born in Ruislip.
- Alexander Fleming (1881–1955), biologist and Nobel Prize winner for the discovery of penicillin, was Regional Pathologist at Harefield Hospital, 1939; this is recorded on a blue plaque at the main entrance door to the hospital.
- Friedrich Georg Houtermans (1903–1966), noted atomic and nuclear physicist, lived in Hayes (where he worked for EMI) between 1933 and 1935.
- Lionel Robbins (1898–1984), eminent economist, was born in Sipson.
- Thomas Wakley (1795–1862), medical and social reformer, and founder of The Lancet, lived at Harefield Park, 1845–1856; he has a memorial stone in the grounds of Harefield Hospital.

=== Drama and film ===
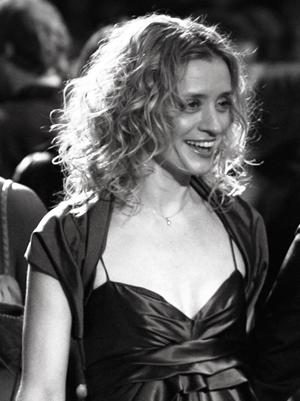
Anne-Marie Duff at the 60th British Academy Film Awards in February 2007

- Joan Dowling (1928–1954), actress, best known for her role in the first "Ealing Comedy" Hue and Cry, grew up in Uxbridge.
- Anne Marie Duff, actress, best known for playing Fiona Gallagher in Shameless and Elizabeth I in The Virgin Queen, grew up in Hayes.
- B. J. Edwards (1838–1914), photography pioneer, lived and worked at Wistowe House in Hayes.
- Derek Jarman (1942–1994), film director whose credits include Jubilee and The Tempest (1979), was born in Northwood.
- Moore Marriott (1885–1949), character actor, best known for the comedies he made with Will Hay and Graham Moffatt, was born in Yiewsley.
- Jessie Matthews (1907–1981), actress, lived in Ruislip in the early 1960s.
- Bernard Miles (1907–1991), actor, writer and director, was born in Uxbridge and attended Uxbridge County School (later Bishopshalt).
- Lana Morris (1930–1998), actress, born in Ruislip.
- Oswald Morris (1915–2014), eminent cinematographer, born in Ruislip.
- Julian Rhind-Tutt (b. 1967), actor, played the Duke of York in The Madness of King George (1994), was born in West Drayton.
- John Rich (1692–1761), the "father of English pantomime", lived in Cowley.
- Andy Serkis, actor, known for his role as Gollum in Peter Jackson's "Lord of the Rings" and "The Hobbit", was born in Ruislip.
- Jane Seymour, actress and Bond girl, was born in Hayes.
- John Stears (1934–1999), Oscar-winning creator of James Bond's modified Aston Martin DB5, Star Wars robots R2-D2 and C-3PO, and the Jedi Knights' lightsabers (among other special effects), was born in Uxbridge.
- Tony Tanner, actor and director, played opposite Harold Pinter in The Birthday Party, was born in Hillingdon.
- Heather Thatcher (1896–1987), actress, signed by MGM in 1930s Hollywood, lived in Hillingdon at the time of her death.

=== Military ===
- Lieutenant-General Gerald Goodlake (1832–1890), Victoria Cross recipient who served with the Coldstream Guards in the Crimean War, is buried in St Mary's churchyard, Harefield.
- Major-General James Grant (1778–1852), who served under Wellington at the Battle of Waterloo, was a lifelong Hayes resident.
- Astronaut and U.S. military man Gregory H. Johnson was born in South Ruislip.
- Private Cecil John Kinross (1896–1957), Victoria Cross recipient who distinguished himself at Passchendaele in World War I, was born in Harefield; he moved with his family in 1912 to Lougheed, Alberta.
- Sergeant Robert Edward Ryder (1895–1978), Victoria Cross recipient who served in World War I in the Middlesex Regiment, was born and is buried in Harefield. A blue plaque on The Old Workhouse marks his birthplace.
- Meinhardt Schomberg (1641–1719), general in the service of Prince William of Orange, built and lived in Hillingdon House.

=== Music ===
- Composer William Byrd (1539/40–1623), "the father of English music", lived as a Catholic recusant in Hayes and Harlington, 1578–88.
- Brian Connolly (1945–1997), singer of glam rock band Sweet, lived at 126 Ash Grove, Harefield.

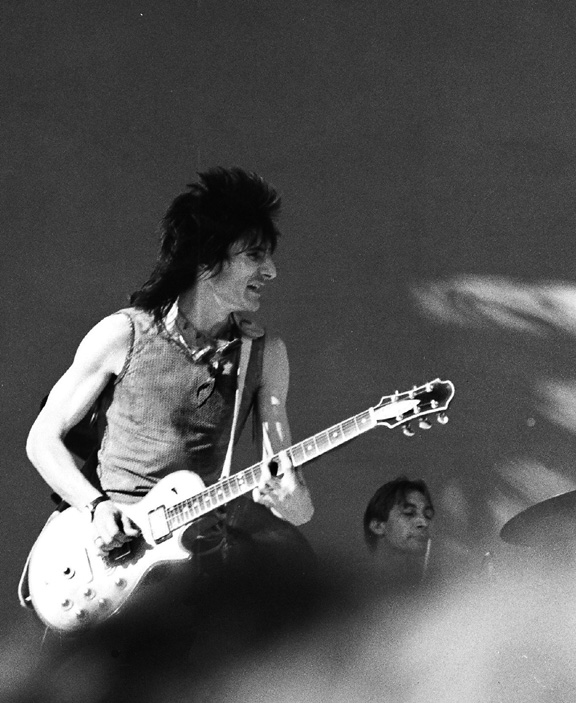
Ronnie Wood of the Rolling Stones

- Steve Conway, singer (1920–1952), lived in Ickenham.
- Musician Paul Gardiner (1958–1984) of Gary Numan's Tubeway Army was born in Hayes.
- Conductor and composer Sir Eugene Goossens (1893–1962), whose career was ruined by the Rosaleen Norton affair, lived in Hillingdon.
- Composer Henry Jackman was born in Hillingdon.
- Larry Page, 1960s manager of pop groups The Kinks and The Troggs, was born in Hayes.
- Malcolm Pool, bass guitarist in rock band The Artwoods, born in Hayes End.
- Steve Priest, bass player of glam rock band Sweet, was born in Hayes.
- Claire Richards, singer in 1990s pop-group Steps, was born in Hillingdon and attended Bishopshalt School.
- Nick Simper, founding member of rock band Deep Purple, lived in Hayes.
- Composer Stephen Storace (1762–1796), famous in his day and a friend of Mozart, lived from the late 1780s in Wood End, Hayes.
- Composer Sir Michael Tippett (1905–1998), was born in Eastcote.
- David Westlake, singer/songwriter of indie band The Servants, was born in Hayes.
- Arthur Wood (1937–2006), lead singer in rock band The Artwoods and brother of Ronnie Wood, was born in West Drayton and grew up in Yiewsley.
- Ted Wood (1939–2003), Traditional Jazz vocalist and drummer was born and grew up in Yiewsley.
- Ronnie Wood, guitarist in rock bands the Rolling Stones and The Faces, was born in Hillingdon Hospital and grew up in Yiewsley.
- Musicians Daniel/Matthew Persell Thompson (Croft & Cotes), were born in Eastcote

=== Nobility ===
- Statesman Henry Bennet, 1st Earl of Arlington (1618–1685), part of Charles II's Cabal Ministry which gave rise to the English word cabal, born in (H)arlington.
- Henry Courtenay, 1st Marquess of Exeter (c. 1498–1539), grandson of Edward IV and a first cousin of Henry VIII, enlarged Swakeleys House, a manor in Ickenham.
- Sir Francis Lee, 4th Baronet (1639–1637), politician and (from 1644) stepson of Henry Wilmot, 1st Earl of Rochester, was educated in Hayes by Dr Thomas Triplett; his son Edward Lee at age 13 married the 12-year-old Lady Charlotte Fitzroy, an illegitimate daughter of Charles II.
- Sir William Paget, 1st Baron Paget (1506–1563), statesman, holder of high office in the courts of Henry VIII, Edward VI, Mary I and Elizabeth I. Lived in West Drayton from 1537 until his death in 1563 and is buried in St Martin Churchyard, West Drayton.
- Sir William Paget, 4th Baron Paget (1572–1629), 'Adventurer' (shareholder) and member of the Council of the Virginia Company (London Company) and the Somers Isles Company is buried in St Martin's Churchyard, West Drayton.
- Peter de Salis (1738–1807), built a villa designed by Joseph Bonomi the Elder called Hillingdon Park (later Little London).
- Jerome, 4th Count de Salis-Soglio (1771–1836), Anglo-Irish landowner and Christian seer, lived (and is buried) in Harlington.
- Sir Robert Vyner, 1st Baronet (1631–1688), Lord Mayor of London 1674–1675, owned Swakeleys House for a time; Vyners School in Ickenham is named after him.

At Hillingdon Court

- Sir Charles Mills, 1st Baronet (1792–1872), had Hillingdon Court built.
- Sir Charles Henry Mills, 2nd Baronet (1830–1898), created Baron Hillingdon in 1886.
- Charles William Mills, 2nd Baron Hillingdon (1855–1919)

=== Politics ===
- Lady Mary Bankes (c. 1598–1661), Royalist figure of the English Civil War, was born in Ruislip.
- Thomas Egerton, Lord Ellesmere (1540–1617) and wife Alice Spencer (1559–1637) lived in Harefield from 1601; Queen Elizabeth I visited in July 1602.
- Christine Keeler (1942–2017), iconic 1960s model involved in the Profumo affair, was born in Uxbridge.
- Lord Randall of Uxbridge (b. 1955), Conservative former MP for Uxbridge and South Ruislip, was born in Uxbridge.
- Sir Michael Shersby, MP for Uxbridge from 1972 until his death in 1997, was born in Ickenham.
- Roger Williams (1603–1683), important early proponent of religious freedom and separation of church and state, was born in Cowley.
- Norman Willis (1933–2014), former leader of the TUC, was born in Hayes.

=== Religion ===
- Annie Isherwood (1862–1906), Anglican nun and founder of the Community of the Resurrection in Grahamstown, Southern Africa, was born in Uxbridge.

=== Sport ===
- Greg Dyke, current chairman of The Football Association (FA) and former BBC director general, grew up in Hayes.
- Connor Emerton (born 1994), cricketer
- Chris Finnegan (1944–2009), Olympic boxing gold medalist, lived in Hayes.
- England cricketer Alex Hales was born in Hillingdon.
- Audley Harrison, Olympic boxer, attended Northwood School.
- England footballer Glenn Hoddle was born in Hayes.
- Golfer Barry Lane was born in Hayes.
- Welsh international footballer Rhoys Wiggins grew up in Hayes.
- Football player/manager/pundit Ray Wilkins grew up in Hayes.

=== Television ===
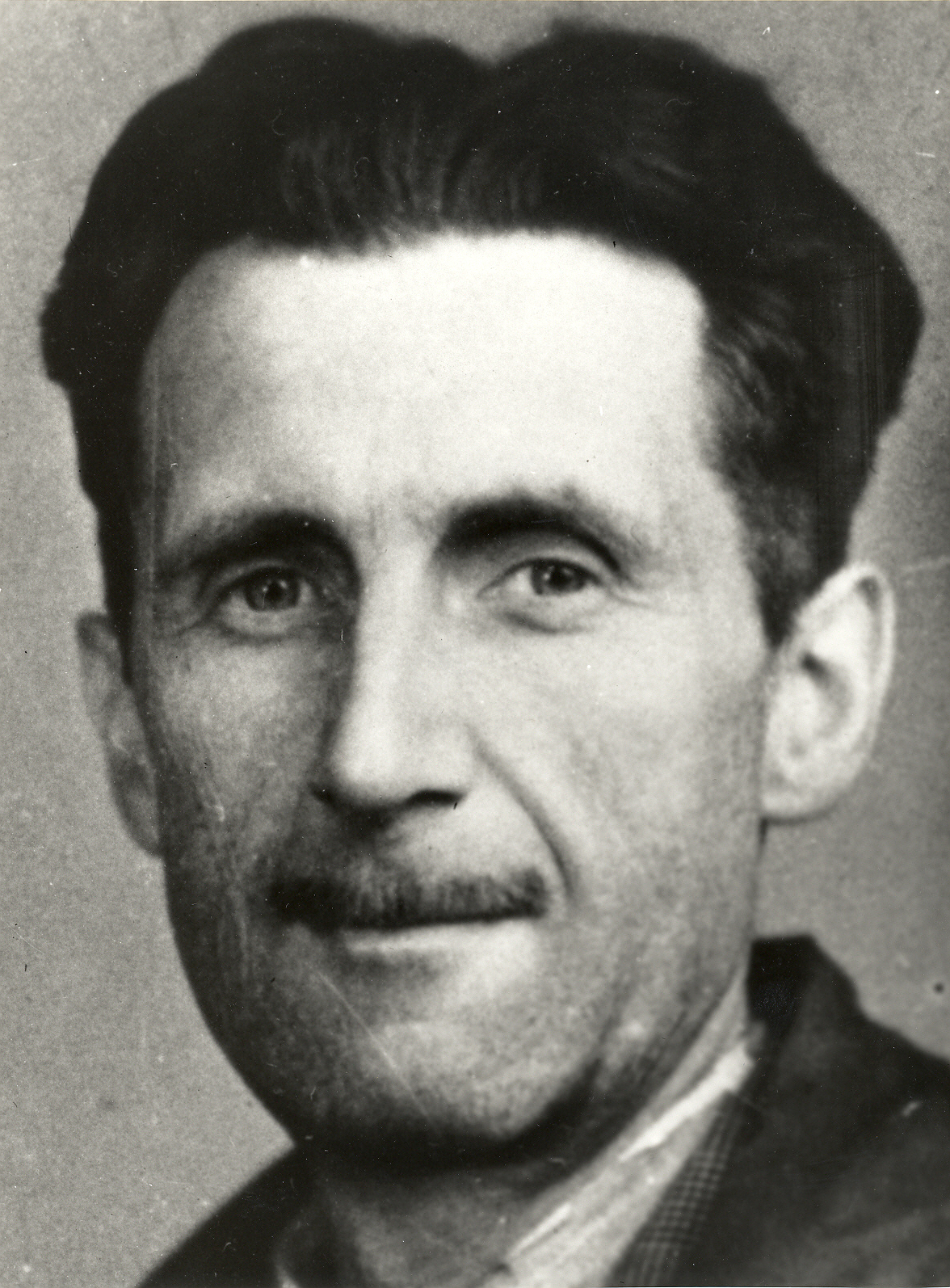
George Orwell in 1933, in which year he lived and worked in Hayes

- Robin Bush (1943–2010) of Channel 4's archaeological series Time Team was born in Hayes.
- Sue Cook, broadcaster, best known for presenting the BBC's Nationwide and Crimewatch, was born in Ruislip.
- Fearne Cotton, television presenter, was born in Northwood and grew up in Eastcote.
- James Corden, actor, host of CBS's The Late Late Show with James Corden, was born in Hillingdon.
- Barry Foster (1927–2002), actor, best known as 1970s TV detective Van der Valk, grew up in Hayes.

=== Visual art ===
- Roger Hilton (1911–1975), post-war pioneer of abstract art, was born in Northwood.

=== Writers ===
- A. M. Burrage (1889–1956), horror fiction writer born in Hillingdon.
- Tony Lee, author born in Hayes.
- Simon Monjack (1970–2010), screenwriter born in Hillingdon.
- George Orwell (1903–1950), author lived and worked in Hayes, 1932–3.

== Places in Hillingdon ==
- Cowley
- Eastcote
- Harefield
- Harlington
- Hayes
- Heathrow Airport
- Harmondsworth
- Hillingdon
- Ickenham
- Longford
- Northwood
- Northwood Hills
- Ruislip
- Ruislip Gardens
- Ruislip Manor
- Sipson
- South Ruislip
- Stockley Park
- Uxbridge
- West Drayton
- Yeading
- Yiewsley
