= William Mills (1750–1820) =

British Member of Parliament

Member of Parliament for Coventry
- In office 1805–1812 Serving with Peter Moore
- Preceded by: Francis William Barlow; Peter Moore
- Succeeded by: Joseph Butterworth; Peter Moore

Member of Parliament for St Ives
- In office 1790–1796 Serving with William Praed
- Preceded by: William Praed; Richard Barwell
- Succeeded by: William Praed; Sir Richard Glyn

Personal details
- Born: 10 November 1750
- Died: 20 March 1820 (aged 69)
- Spouse: Elizabeth Digby (m. 1786; died 1820)
- Relations: Charles Mills (brother); Charles Mills, 1st Baron Hillingdon (grandson)
- Children: 9, including John and Charles

William Mills (10 November 1750 – 20 March 1820) was a British Member of Parliament and Director, East India Company.

== Early life ==
William Mills was born on 10 November 1750. He was the eldest son of the Rev. John Mills, rector of Barford and Oxhill, Warwickshire, and his younger brother was Charles Mills, MP for Warwick.

He was educated at Felsted School. He inherited Warden's Hall, High Ongar, Essex from his uncle William in 1782 and succeeded his father in 1791.

== Career ==
He served as a director of the East India Company from 1778 to 1785. He was elected MP for St Ives in 1790, sitting until 1796 and for Coventry for 1805 to 1812. He was appointed High Sheriff of Hampshire for 1803–04.

== Personal life ==
On 7 April 1786, Mills married Elizabeth Digby (1758–1828), the daughter of Hon. Wriothesley Digby (son of the 5th Baron Digby) of Coleshill and Meriden Hall, Warwickshire. Together, they had six sons and three daughters, including:

- Elizabeth Mills (d. 1880), who married William Wingfield-Baker, widower of Lady Charlotte-Maria Digby (eldest daughter of the 1st Earl Digby) son of George Wingfield, in 1813.
- John Mills (1789–1871), who was also an MP for Rochester; he married Sarah Charlotte Micklethwait, daughter of Nathaniel Micklethwait and Lady Charlotte Rous (daughter of the 1st Earl of Stradbroke), in 1835.
- Charlotte Mills (1790–1855), who married Henry Combe Compton, son of John Compton, in 1810.
- Maj. William Mills (1791–1838), who married Charlotte Hare, daughter of James Hare, in 1814.
- Sir Charles Mills, 1st Baronet (1792–1872), who married Emily Cox, daughter of banker Richard Henry Cox, of Hillingdon House, in 1825.
- Francis Mills (1793–1854), who died unmarried.
- Henry Digby Mills (1799–1808), who died unmarried.
- Edward Wheler Mills (1801–1865), who married Frances Ann Wingfield, daughter of his brother-in-law William Wingfield-Baker his first wife, Lady Charlotte-Maria Digby, in 1831.

Mills died on 20 March 1820, leaving his sons John and Charles, £10,000 each, as well as William's brother, Charles's estate.

Parliament of Great Britain
Preceded by William Praed; Richard Barwell	Member of Parliament for St Ives; 1790–1796; With: William Praed	Succeeded by William Praed; Sir Richard Glyn
Parliament of the United Kingdom
Preceded by Francis William Barlow; Peter Moore	Member of Parliament for Coventry; 1805–1812; With: Peter Moore	Succeeded by Joseph Butterworth; Peter Moore
