= Overstrand Hall =

Country house in Norfolk, England

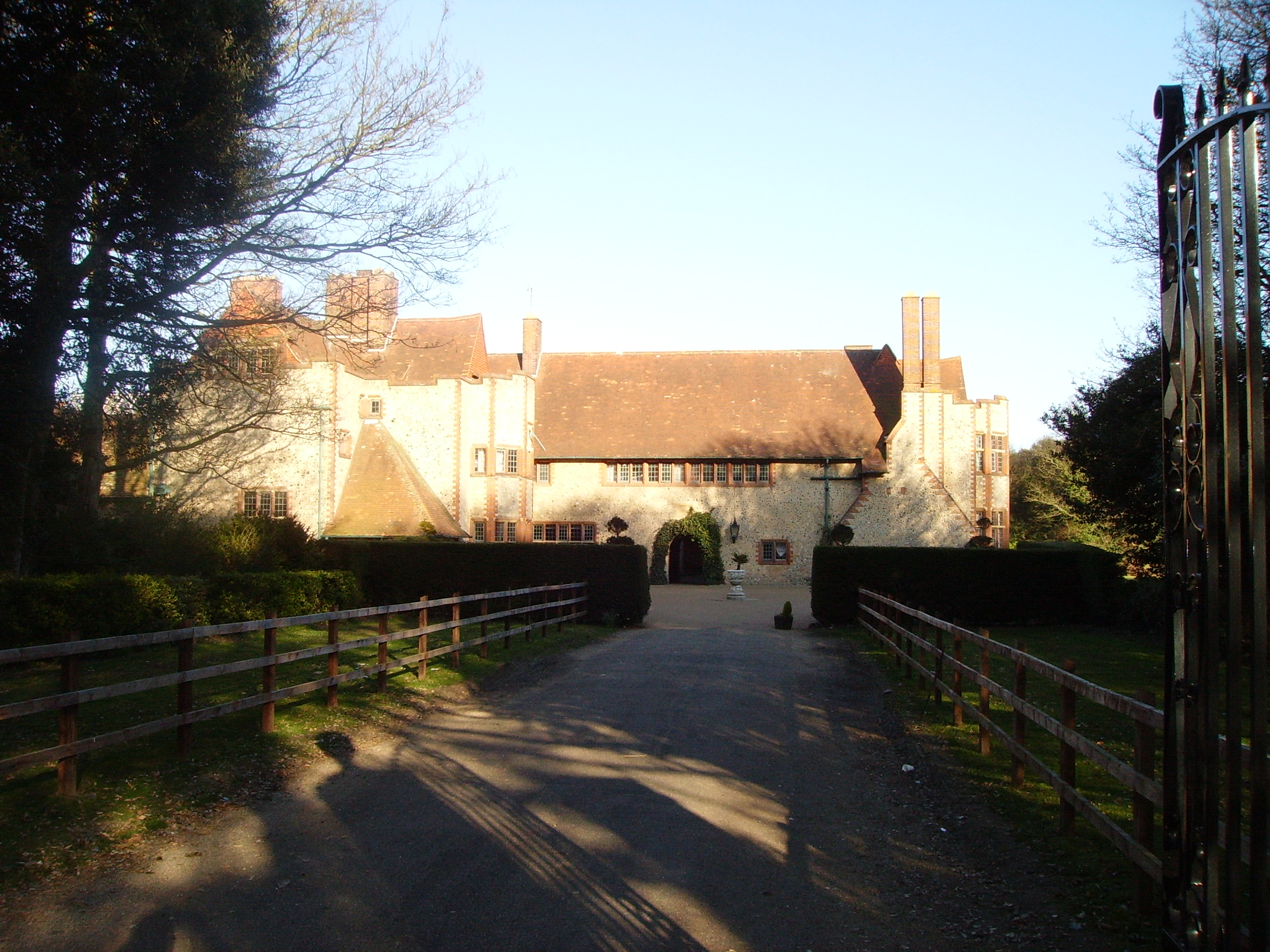
- Interactive map of the Overstrand Hall area

General information
- Type: English country house
- Location: Overstrand, Norfolk, England
- Coordinates: 52.9186°N 1.3315°E
- Construction started: 1899
- Completed: 1901
- Client: Charles Mills, 2nd Baron Hillingdon
- Owner: PGL Travel Ltd.

Design and construction
- Architect: Edwin Lutyens

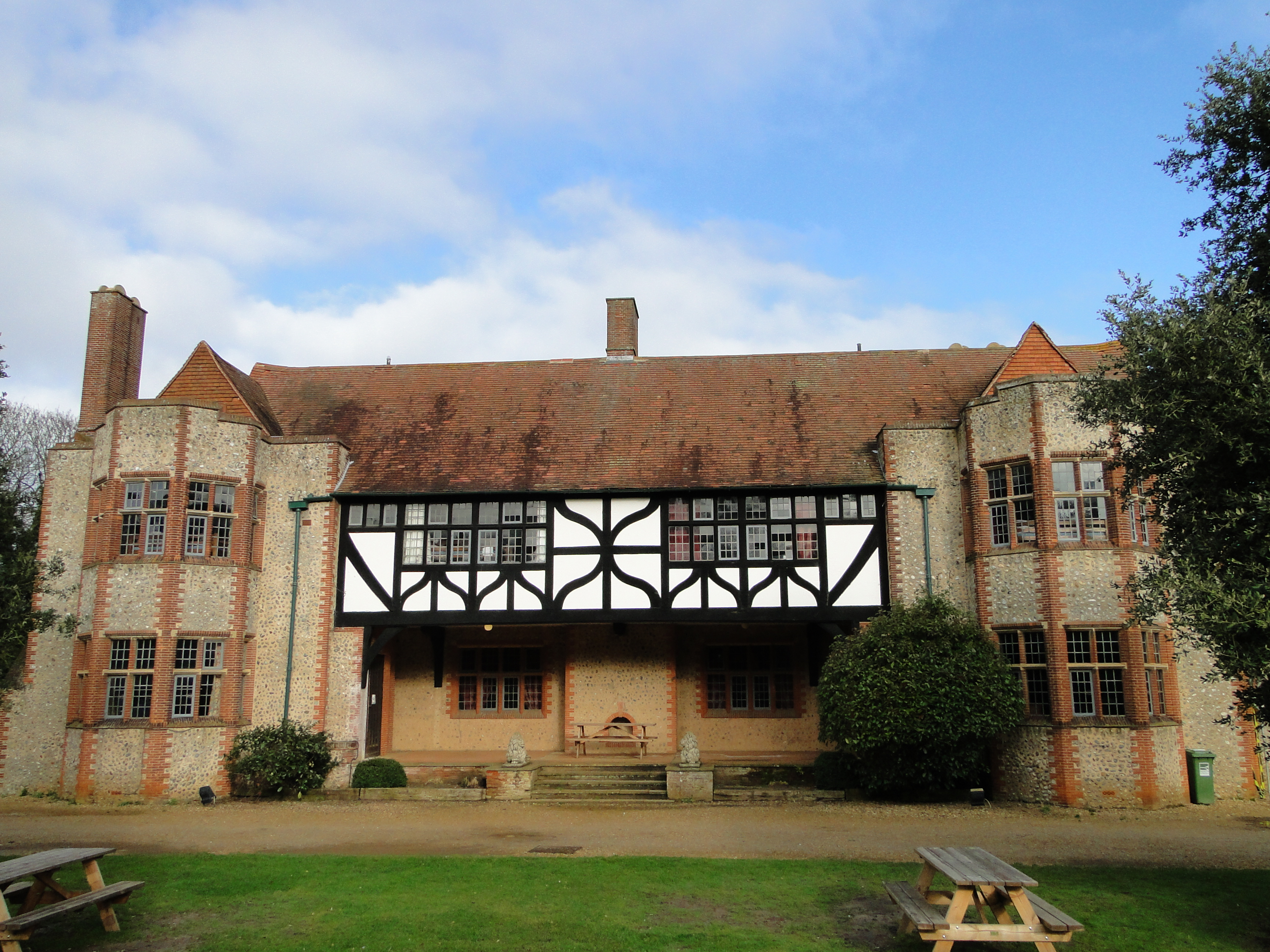
Overstrand Hall, south elevation

Overstrand Hall is a country house in Overstrand, Norfolk, England, designed by Edwin Lutyens for Charles William Mills, 2nd Baron Hillingdon, a partner in Glyn, Mills & Co. Bank. It was built between 1899 and 1901 and is Grade II listed as of 27 September 1972. The Mills family used Overstrand as a weekend residence, preferring their homes Hillingdon Court and Dorton House as their main residences.

Nicholas Pevsner described Overstrand as "one of (Lutyens's) most remarkable buildings, at the time when he had reached maturity but still believed to the full in his own inventiveness." The house is of a complex courtyard plan, with a varied range of materials, "stone with half-timbering, flint with brick and tile," and styles, "Jacobean with classical, vernacular with Italianate." Burke's and Savills Guide to Country Houses: East Anglia describes the hall as "an important early work by Lutyens, his first large work outside the Home Counties."

During the First World War, the hall was used as a military hospital and the Mills family sold the house for use as a convalescent home in 1932. Since 1999 the hall has been home to a residential activity centre.

== PGL activity centre ==
Overstrand Hall has been a residential activity centre since 1999, catering for 7–17 year olds. It has been run by PGL since 2025.
