= I Take What I Want =

I Take What I Want may refer to:

- "I Take What I Want", a Sam & Dave song, covered by Aretha Franklin, Ann Peebles, Rory Gallagher, James & Bobby Purify among others
- I Take What I Want, an EP by The Artwoods
