= Sir Charles Mills, 1st Baronet =

British banker and member of the Council of India (1792–1872)

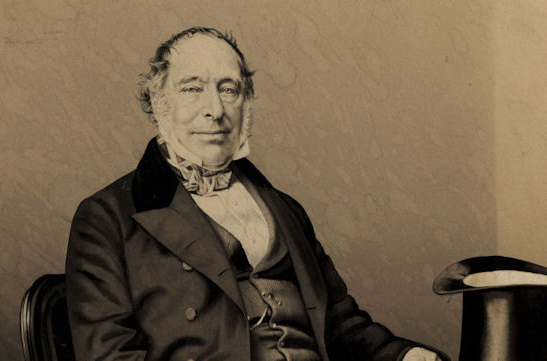

Sir Charles Mills, 1st Baronet (23 January 1792 – 4 October 1872) was a British banker and member of the Council of India.

== Early life ==
Born at Popes, Hatfield, he was the third son of William Mills, a director of the Honourable East India Company, and the younger brother of John Mills.

== Career ==
Like his father, he was connected with the banking firm of Glyn, Mills and Company, in conjunction with Sir Richard Glyn, 1st Baronet and later his son Lord Wolverton and grandson George Grenfell Glyn.

On 28 August 1822, he was appointed a director of the East India Company, retaining the post until 1858. Upon the liquidation of the company by the Government of India Act 1858, he was appointed to the Council of India, acting as a financial adviser to the Secretary of State for India until resigning in 1868. He was created a baronet, of Hillingdon Court, Middlesex, on 17 November 1868, for his services on the council.

== Personal life ==
In 1825, he married Emily Cox, daughter of the banker Richard Henry Cox, of Hillingdon House, Middlesex. The family lived for a while at Camelford House. They had six daughters and one son:

- Emily Elizabeth Mills, (5 February 1825 - 30 April 1877), who married Rev John Nathaniel Micklethwaite in 1849.
- Charlotte Mills, (30 January 1826 - 22 August 1903), who married Harcourt Vanden-Bempde-Johnstone, 1st Baron Derwent in 1850, and became Lady Derwent.
- Harriet Mills, (b&d 1827).
- Charles Henry Mills, (26 April 1830 – 3 April 1898), who became first Baron Hillingdon.
- Selina Mills, (30 June 1832 - 6 August 1911), who eventually moved to Salisbury, Wiltshire.
- Agnes Mills, (23 January 1834 - 22 March 1927), who married Rev George Gaisford in 1858.
- Eleanor Jane Mills, (22 June 1840 - 24 May 1904), who married the Hon Cecil Duncombe, of Feversham, in 1859.

Sir Charles had Hillingdon Court built nearby to serve as the Mills family home. Their son Charles Henry followed his father into banking and was later raised to the Peerage as Baron Hillingdon.

He died in 1872 at Hillingdon Court, having acquired a large estate there.

== Arms ==
Coat of arms of Sir Charles Mills, 1st Baronet
Crest A demi-lion reguardant Or gorged with a collar gemel Azure between the paws a millrind Sable. Escutcheon Gyronny of eight Argent and Azure a millrind Sable. Motto Nil Conscire Sibi

Baronetage of the United Kingdom
New creation	Baronet (of Hillingdon); 1868–1872	Succeeded by Charles Mills
