= Barnaby Backwell =

18th-century English politician

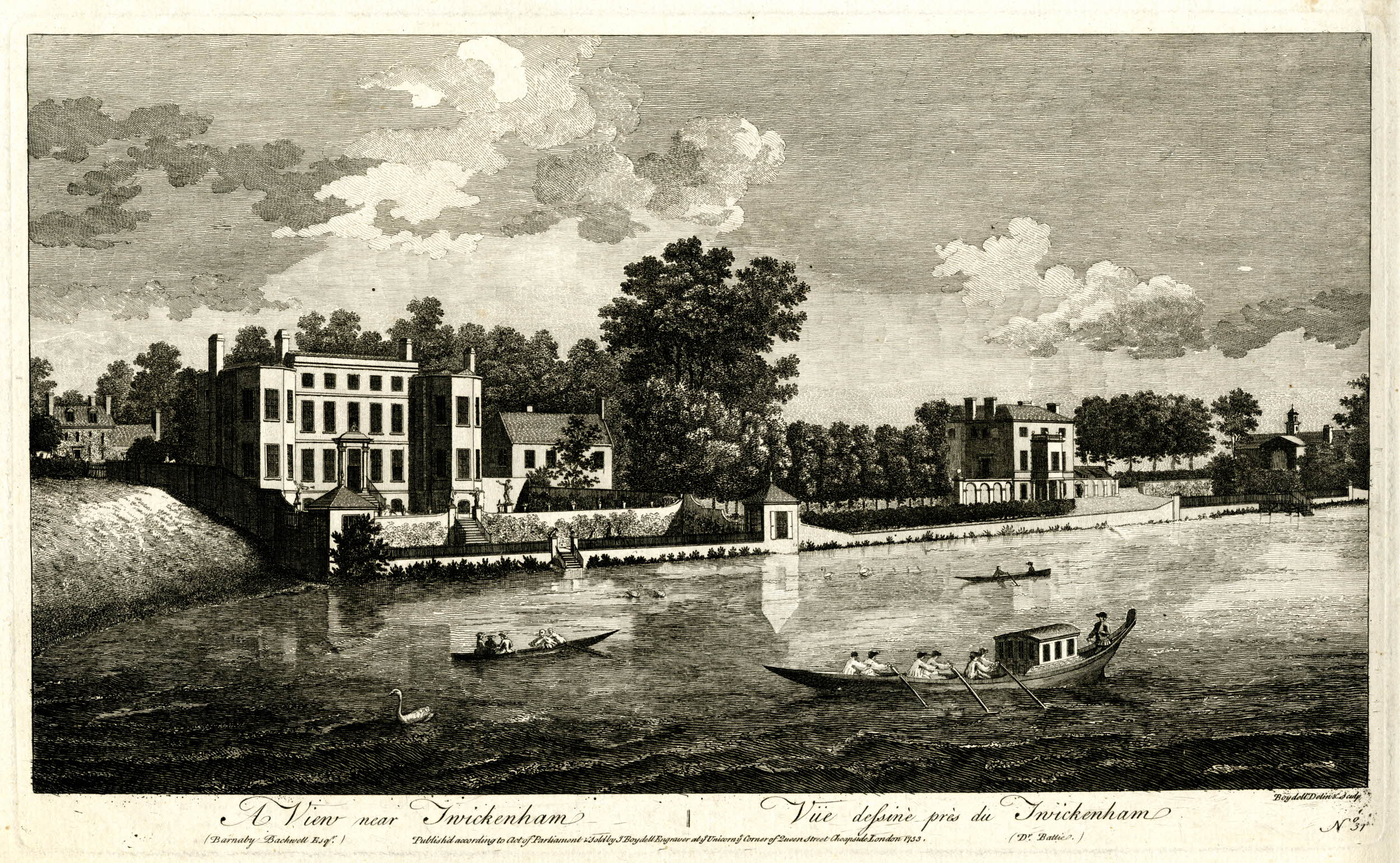
Barnaby Backwell's house (left) at Twickenham from the River Thames, 1753. Dr. William Battie's house on the right.

Barnaby Backwell (died 3 October 1754) was the member of Parliament for Bishop's Castle, Shropshire, in 1754.

== Early life ==
Barnaby Backwell was the second but first surviving son of Tyringham Backwell of Tyringham, Buckinghamshire, and Elizabeth, daughter of Sir Francis Child, Lord Mayor of London. He was the grandson of the financier Edward Backwell.

== Career ==
Backwell was a partner in the bank of Samuel and Francis Child, and was said to have an income of £4,000 per annum.

In the General election of 1754, he was elected to Parliament for Bishop's Castle, a "rotten borough", where his uncle Samuel Child had been the M.P. until his death in 1753. The borough was under the control of the Walcots, who owed a great deal of money to Child's Bank. Backwell was classified as a Tory in Dupplin's list of 1754.

He died the following October.

== Family ==
Backwell had married twice, firstly Margaret (d. 1745), the daughter of Samuel Clarke, a London merchant, and secondly Sarah Gibbon, with whom he had a son and three daughters. His daughter, Elizabeth Tyringham, married William Praed.
