= Charles Mills, 1st Baron Hillingdon =

British banker and politician (1830–1898)

The Right Honourable The Lord Hillingdon
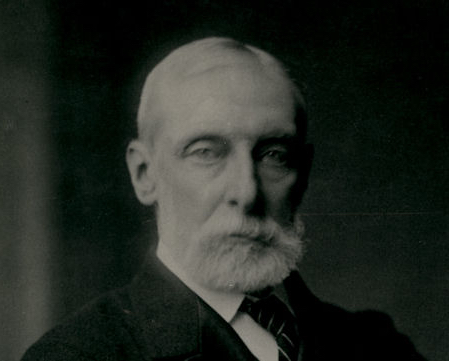

Member of Parliament for Kent West
- In office 1868–1885 Serving with John Gilbert Talbot, Viscount Lewisham
- Preceded by: Viscount Holmesdale; William Hart Dyke
- Succeeded by: Constituency abolished

Member of Parliament for Northallerton
- In office 1865–1866
- Preceded by: William Battie-Wrightson
- Succeeded by: Egremont William Lascelles

Personal details
- Born: Charles Henry Mills; 26 April 1830
- Died: 3 April 1898 (aged 67)
- Spouse: Lady Louisa Lascelles (m. 1853; died 1898)
- Parent(s): Sir Charles Mills, 1st Baronet; Emily Cox

Charles Henry Mills, 1st Baron Hillingdon (26 April 1830 – 3 April 1898), known from 1872 to 1886 as Sir Charles Mills, 2nd Baronet, was a British banker and Conservative politician.

== Early life ==
Mills was born at Camelford House, Park Lane, London on 26 April 1830. He was the only son of Sir Charles Mills, 1st Baronet, and his wife Emily Cox, daughter of banker Richard Henry Cox, of Hillingdon House, Middlesex.

His paternal grandparents were Elizabeth (née Digby) Mills and William Mills, a director of the Honourable East India Company. His uncle was John Mills.

== Career ==
He was a partner in the banking firm of Glyn, Mills & Co. In 1865 he entered Parliament for Northallerton, a seat he held until 1866 when he was unseated due to bribery by his agents. Later, he represented Kent West from 1868 to 1885.

He succeeded his father in the baronetcy in 1872, inheriting Hillingdon Court. On 15 February 1886 he was raised to the peerage as Baron Hillingdon, of Hillingdon in the County of Middlesex.

== Personal life ==
In 1853, Lord Hillingdon married Lady Louisa Isabella Lascelles, daughter of Henry Lascelles, 3rd Earl of Harewood and the former and Lady Louisa Thynne (a daughter of the 2nd Marquess of Bath). Together, they were the parents of:

- Charles William Mills, 2nd Baron Hillingdon (1855–1919), who married Hon. Alice Marion Harbord, daughter of Charles Harbord, 5th Baron Suffield, in 1886.
- Hon. Algernon Henry Mills (1856–1922), who married Hon. Mary Frances Seymour Dawson-Damer, a daughter of Lionel Dawson-Damer, 4th Earl of Portarlington.
- Hon. Susan Emily Mills (1858–1860), who died young.
- Hon. Egremont John Mills (1866–1947), a Lt.-Col. in the West Kent Imperial Yeomanry who married Florence Hozler, daughter of Alfred Hozler, in 1917.
- Hon. Kenelm James Mills (1868–1900), a Lt. in The Sherwood Foresters (Derbyshire Regiment) who died unmarried.
- Evereard Arthur Mills (1869–1870), who died young.
- Hon. Geoffrey Edward Mills (1875–1917), who married Grace Victoria Boddam, daughter of Hungerford Tudor Boddam, in 1901. They divorced in 1913 and he married Hilda Susan Ellen Cooper, daughter of Sir Daniel Cooper, 2nd Baronet, in 1917.
- Hon. Mabel Blanche Mills (d. 1936), who married Charles Molyneux Grenfell, son of Charles William Grenfell and brother to the 1st Baron Desborough), in 1887.
- Hon. Isabel Mary Mills (d. 1941), who married Col. Sir Herbert Lawrence, son of John Lawrence, 1st Baron Lawrence, in 1892.
- Hon. Violet Louisa Mills (d. 1958), who died unmarried.

He died in April 1898, aged 67, and was succeeded in his titles by his eldest son Charles. Lady Hillingdon died in November 1918, aged 88.

== Arms ==
Coat of arms of Charles Mills, 1st Baron Hillingdon
Crest A demi-lion reguardant Or gorged with a collar gemel Azure between the paws a millrind Sable. Escutcheon Gyronny of eight Argent and Azure a millrind Sable. Supporters On either side a lion reguardant Or gorged with a collar gemel Azure charged on the shoulder with a cross flory Sable. Motto Nil Conscire Sibi

Parliament of the United Kingdom
Preceded by William Battie-Wrightson	Member of Parliament for Northallerton; 1865–1866	Succeeded by Egremont William Lascelles
Preceded by Viscount Holmesdale; William Hart Dyke	Member of Parliament for Kent West; 1868–1885; With: John Gilbert Talbot 1868–1878; Viscount Lewisham 1878–1885	Constituency abolished
Baronetage of the United Kingdom
Preceded by Charles Mills	Baronet (of Hillingdon); 1872–1898	Succeeded by Charles William Mills
Peerage of the United Kingdom
New creation	Baron Hillingdon; 1886–1892	Succeeded by Charles William Mills
