= William Praed =

English businessman, banker and politician

William Praed (24 June 1747 – 9 October 1833) was an English businessman, banker, and politician who sat in the House of Commons from 1774 to 1808.

He is not to be confused with his first cousin of the same name, William Mackworth Praed, serjeant-at-law (1756–1835) and revising barrister for Bath who was the father of Winthrop Mackworth Praed.

== Early life and family ==
He was the oldest son of Humphrey Mackworth Praed (c. 1718–1803) of the manor of Trevethoe, near St Ives in Cornwall. His father was a Member of Parliament for St Ives and then for Cornwall. His mother Mary was a daughter of William Forester, the MP for Wenlock. He was educated at Eton College and at Magdalen College, Oxford.

In 1778, he married Elizabeth Tyringham, daughter of the banker and MP Barnaby Backwell, of Tyringham in Buckinghamshire. They had ten children.

== Career ==
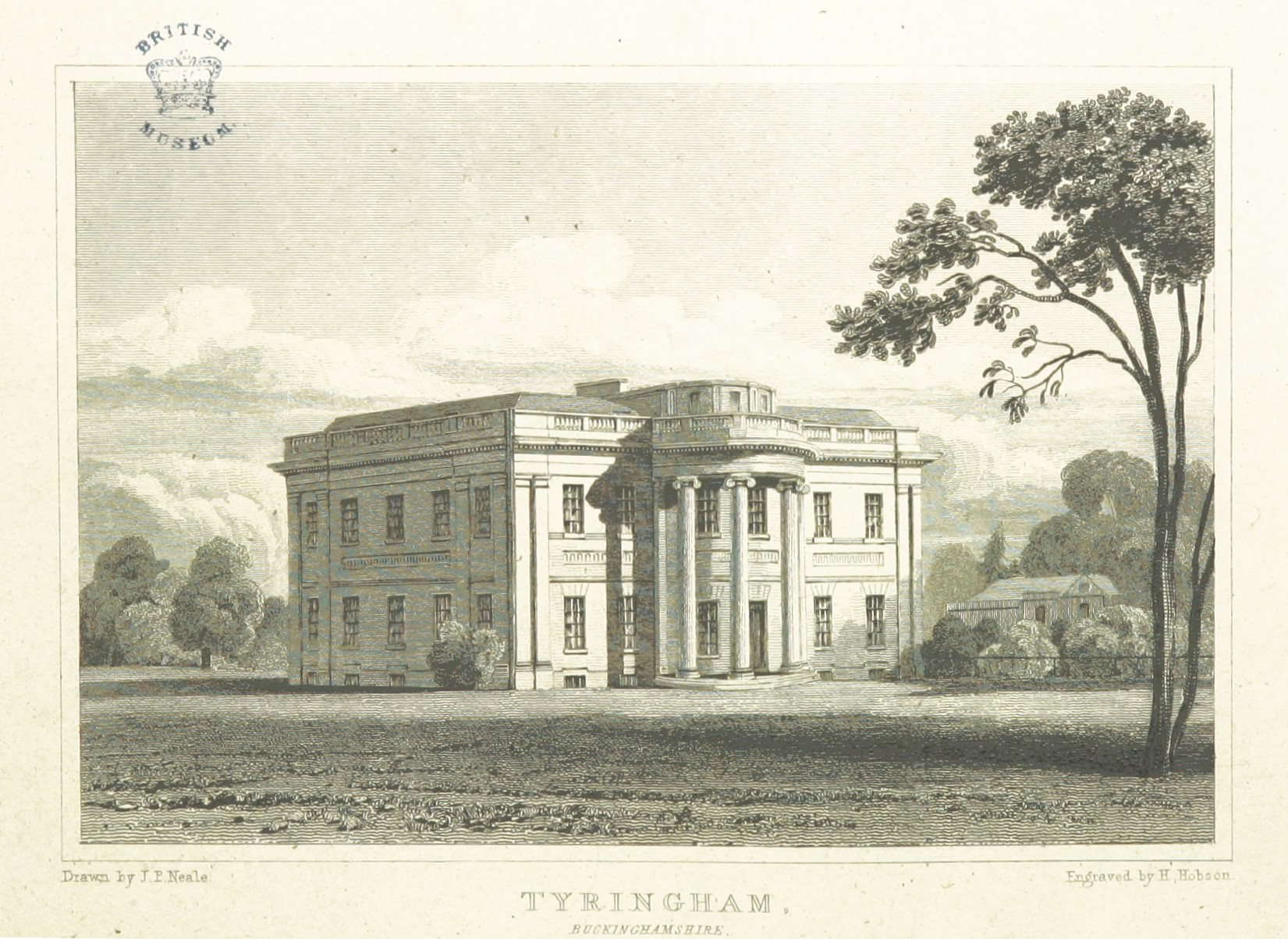
Tyringham Hall in 1818.

A partner in his family's banks in Cornwall, Praed also founded Praed's & Co in Fleet Street, London.

His family mostly controlled the borough of St Ives, which elected him to the House of Commons at the 1774 general election. An election petition was lodged alleging various forms of corruption, and Praed's election was declared void. He won the resulting by-election, and thereafter spent enough money to secure control of the borough until 1802, when he sold one of the seats.

Having already built a new country seat at Tyringham Hall in Buckinghamshire, he sold Trevethoe manor, and his interest in Cornwall waned. In 1806 he sold the second seat, and secured election at Banbury, where his money had won over the corporation. That election was voided on petition, and Praed lost the resulting by-election; he never returned to Parliament.

Praed's business interests were a higher priority than parliamentary affairs, and he was particularly focused on the Grand Junction Canal, of which he was chairman. He steered through Parliament the bill which authorised its construction, and Praed Street in Paddington (near the canal's Paddington Basin) in west London is named after him.

== Death ==
He died in October 1833 and was buried in Tyringham Church with a monument carved by William Behnes.

Parliament of Great Britain
Preceded by Thomas Durrant; Adam Drummond	Member of Parliament for St Ives; 1774–1775; With: Adam Drummond	Succeeded by Adam Drummond; Thomas Wynn
Preceded by Thomas Wynn; Philip Dehany	Member of Parliament for St Ives; 1780–1800; With: Abel Smith 1780–84; Richard Barwell 1784–90; William Mills 1790–96; Sir Richard Glyn, Bt from 1796	Succeeded by Parliament of the United Kingdom
Parliament of the United Kingdom
Preceded by Parliament of Great Britain	Member of Parliament for St Ives; 1801–1806; With: Sir Richard Glyn, Bt to 1802; Jonathan Raine 1802–06	Succeeded by Francis Horner; Samuel Stephens
Preceded by Dudley Long North	Member of Parliament for Banbury; 1806–1808	Succeeded by Dudley Long North
