= Charles Mills, 2nd Baron Hillingdon =

British banker and politician (1855–1919)

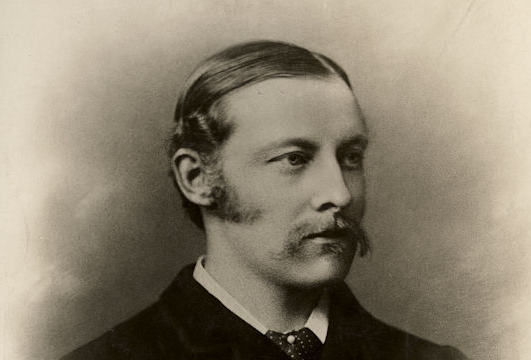

Charles William Mills, 2nd Baron Hillingdon (26 January 1855 – 6 April 1919) was a British banker and Conservative politician who sat in the House of Commons from 1885 to 1892, speaking once, in 1889.

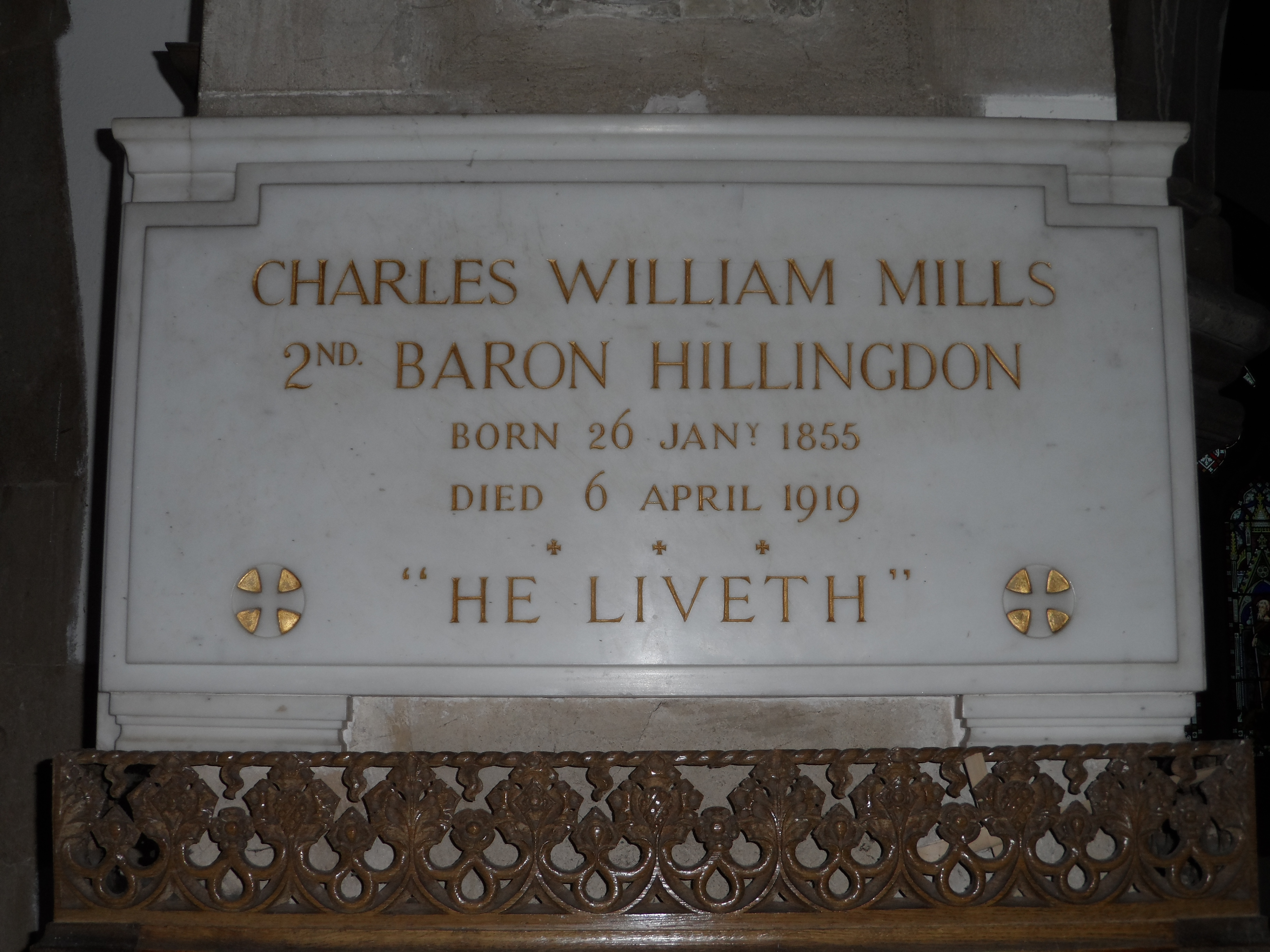
Memorial to Charles William Mills in St John the Baptist's Church, Hillingdon

Mills was the eldest son of Charles Mills, 1st Baron Hillingdon and Lady Louisa Isabella (d.1918), daughter of Henry Lascelles, 3rd Earl of Harewood. He was a lieutenant in the Queen's Own West Kent Yeomanry and a partner in the banking firm of Glyn, Mills & Co.

In the 1885 general election, Mills was elected as member of parliament (MP) for the inceptive safe seat of Sevenoaks in which he owned The Wildernesse, setting up community allotments and an orphanage there. He stood down from the Commons at the 1892 general election. In 1898 he inherited the title Baron Hillingdon and Hillingdon Court outright.

In the same year Hillingdon commissioned Edwin Lutyens, who was then working locally, to design Overstrand Hall. Its work began in 1899 and it was completed by 1901. Nikolaus Pevsner considered it one of Lutyens' most remarkable buildings, but other critics of the day thought it "lacked the picturesqueness of his best works".

Lord Hillingdon was elected a Fellow of the Royal Statistical Society in March 1900.

Hillingdon was godfather to Harry Elkins Widener, son of George Dunton Widener who both perished on the Titanic.

He died in April 1919, aged 64, and was succeeded in the barony by his second son Arthur, the MP for Uxbridge, elected unopposed to replace his elder brother. Charles Thomas Mills was killed on the Western Front in France in 1915.

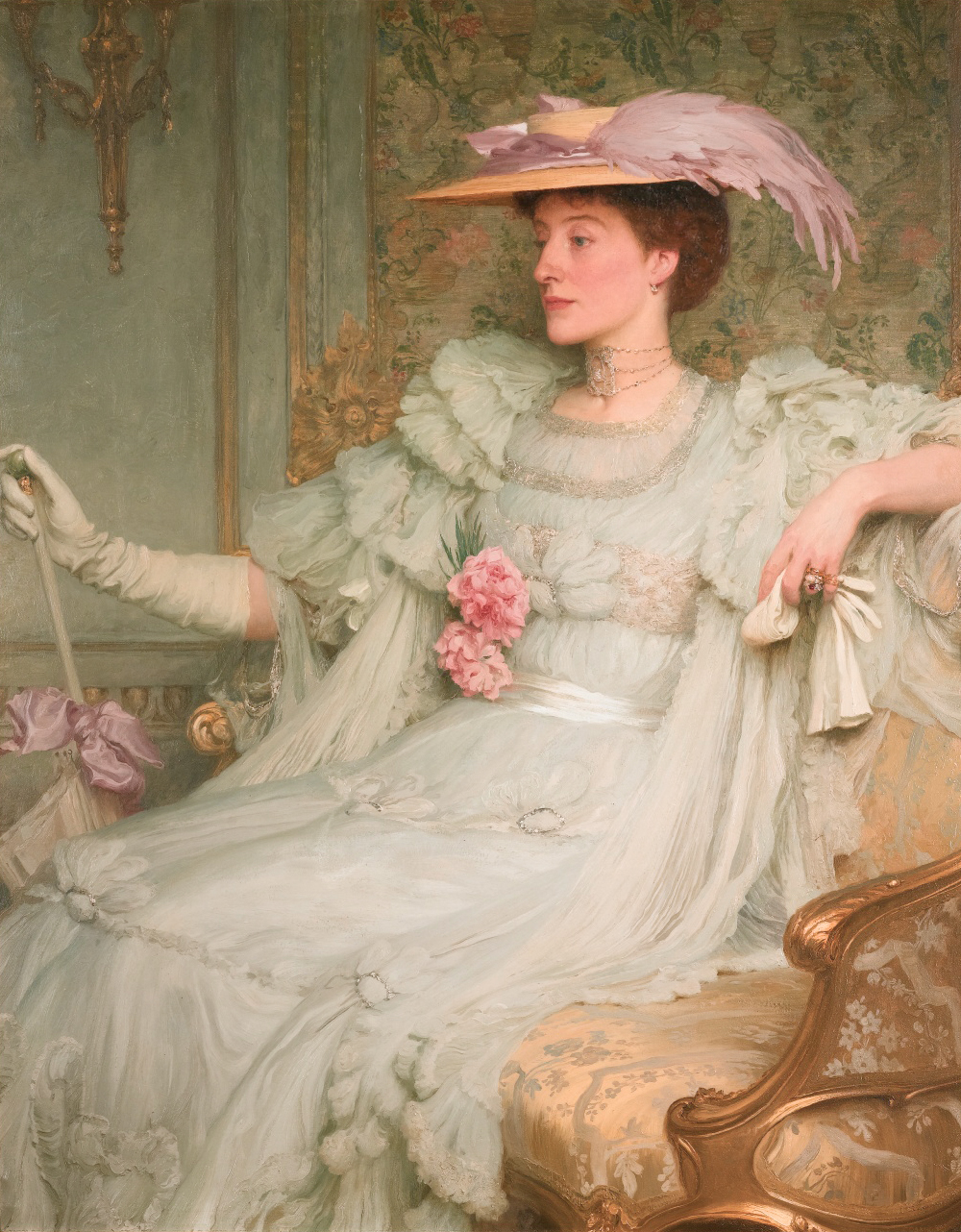
Lady Hillingdon (Frank Dicksee, 1905)

Hillingdon married Alice Marion Harbord, daughter of Charles Harbord, 5th Baron Suffield, in 1886. They were given Overstrand Hall as a wedding present. Lord Hillingdon's probate was sworn in 1919 at £1,000,000 (equivalent to about £58,000,000 in 2023) as was that of his mother at a little over 5% of that sum.

== Arms ==
Coat of arms of Charles Mills, 2nd Baron Hillingdon
Crest A demi-lion reguardant Or gorged with a collar gemel Azure between the paws a millrind Sable. Escutcheon Gyronny of eight Argent and Azure a millrind Sable. Supporters On either side a lion reguardant Or gorged with a collar gemel Azure charged on the shoulder with a cross flory Sable. Motto Nil Conscire Sibi

Parliament of the United Kingdom
New constituency	Member of Parliament for Sevenoaks; 1885–1892	Succeeded by Henry Forster
Peerage of the United Kingdom
Preceded by Charles Mills	Baron Hillingdon; 1898–1919	Succeeded by Arthur Mills
