= Baron Hillingdon =

Title in the Peerage of the United Kingdom

Baron Hillingdon, of Hillingdon in the County of Middlesex, was a title in the Peerage of the United Kingdom held by the Mills family.

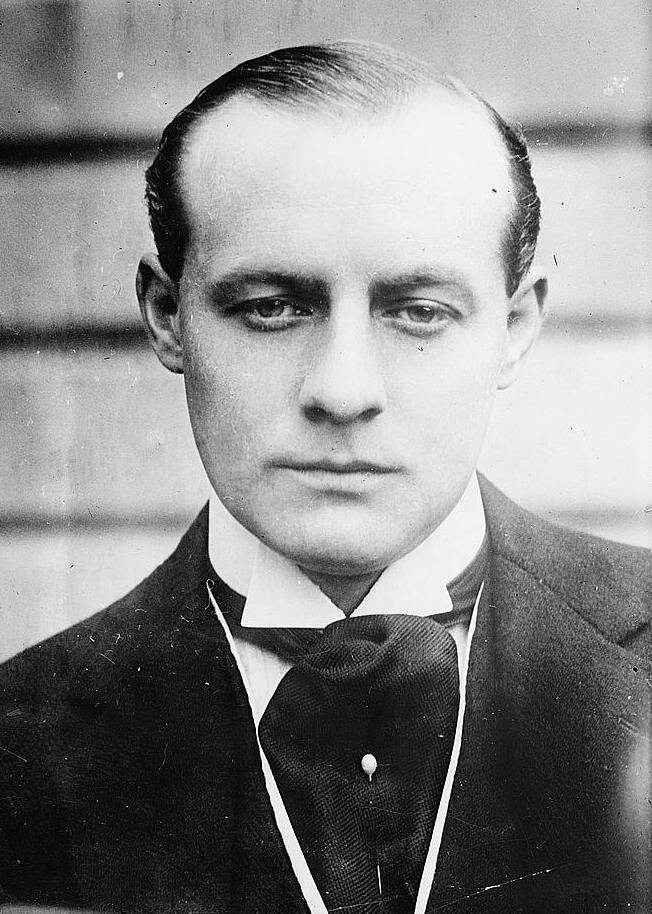
Charles Thomas Mills, eldest son of the second Baron.

The family descended from William Mills, who married Elizabeth Digby. Their son was Charles Mills, a Director of the Honourable East India Company and a member of the Council of India. On 17 November 1868 he was created a Baronet in the Baronetage of the United Kingdom. He was succeeded by his only son, Charles Henry Mills, who became the second Baronet. He married Lady Louisa Lescelles, and was a banker and Conservative politician. On 15 February 1886 he was raised to the Peerage of the United Kingdom as Baron Hillingdon, of Hillingdon in the County of Middlesex. The title was created with remainder to the heirs male of the grantee lawfully begotten.

When he died the titles passed to his eldest son, the second Baron, Charles William Mills. He was also a banker and Conservative politician. He was married to The Hon. Alice Harbord, and was succeeded by his son, the third Baron, Arthur Robert Mills, due to his eldest son, Charles Thomas Mills being killed in action. The second Lord Hillingdon's probate was sworn in 1919 at £1,000,000 (equivalent to about £58,000,000 in 2023) as was that of his mother at a little over 5% of that sum. The third Baron was married to The Hon. Edith Mary Cadogan, daughter of the Viscount Chelsea, whose sister married The 10th Duke of Marlborough. The third Baron sat as Conservative Member of Parliament for Uxbridge.

When he died the titles passed to his eldest son, the fourth Baron, Charles Hedworth Mills, who died on 6 May 1978, The title then passed to the third Baron's first cousin, Patrick Charles Mills, son of Geoffrey Edward Mills, sixth son of the first baron. He died in 1982.

The Mills family partly owned the London bank Glyn, Mills & Co. and held close business relationships with the Rothschild family. Hillingdon Court, built by Sir Charles Mills, 1st Baronet in 1858, served as the preferred family home until it was sold in 1919.

== Mills Baronets, of Hillingdon Court (1868) ==
- Sir Charles Mills, 1st Baronet (1792–1872)
- Sir Charles Henry Mills, 2nd Baronet (1830–1898) (created Baron Hillingdon in 1886)

== Barons Hillingdon (1886) ==
- Charles Henry Mills, 1st Baron Hillingdon (1830–1898)
- Charles William Mills, 2nd Baron Hillingdon (1855–1919)
  - Hon. Charles Thomas Mills (1887–1915)
- Arthur Robert Mills, 3rd Baron Hillingdon (1891–1952)
- Charles Hedworth Mills, 4th Baron Hillingdon (1922–1978)
- Patrick Charles Mills, 5th Baron Hillingdon (1906–1982)

== Arms ==
Coat of arms of the Barons Hillingdon
Crest A demi-lion reguardant Or gorged with a collar gemel Azure between the paws a millrind Sable. Escutcheon Gyronny of eight Argent and Azure a millrind Sable. Supporters On either side a lion reguardant Or gorged with a collar gemel Azure charged on the shoulder with a cross flory Sable. Motto Nil Conscire Sibi

== See also ==
- Mills baronets
