= Richard Barwell =

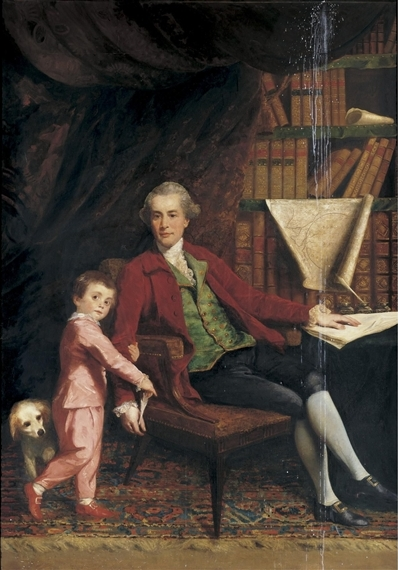

Member of the Supreme Council of Bengal
- In office 1774 – 29 February 1780

Personal details
- Born: 8 October 1741 Calcutta, Bengal
- Died: 2 September 1804 (aged 62) Stansted Park, Sussex, England

Richard Barwell (8 October 1741 – 2 September 1804) was a merchant with the East India Company and amassed one of the largest fortunes in early British India.

Barwell was the son of William Barwell, governor of Bengal in 1748, and afterwards a director of the East India Company and Sheriff of Surrey in 1768. His family, which apparently came from Kegworth, Leicestershire, had been connected with the East for generations.

== Early life ==
Barwell was born in Calcutta in 1741 and appointed a writer on the Bengal establishment of the East India Company in 1756 and landed at Calcutta on 21 June 1758.

== Career ==
After a succession of lucrative appointments, he was nominated in the Regulating Act 1773 (13 Geo. 3. c. 63) a member of council in Bengal, with Philip Francis as one of his colleagues, General John Clavering as commander-in-chief, and Warren Hastings as governor-general. The statute is dated 1772–3, but the members of council did not take their seats until 20 October 1774.

Barwell is known to history for his constant support of Hastings, in opposition to the party led by Francis. Barwell wrote of him, "He possesses much experience, a solid judgment, much greater fertility of resources than I have, and his manners are easy and pleasant." Francis differed, writing, "He is rapacious without industry, and ambitious without an exertion of his faculties or steady application to affairs. He will do whatever can be done by bribery and intrigue; he has no other resource."

Barwell has been cited for sharp business practices. Writing in the Cambridge History of India, H.H. Dodwell says:

He made a great fortune in India, and, as Sir James Stephen says, this fact of itself raises a presumption against his official purity. ... his standard was low. We find him writing to his sister in 1769: "I would spend 5,000 to secure to myself the chiefship of Dacca, and to supervise. the collection of the revenues of that province". In another letter he states that he considers himself justified in evading the law which prohibited the Company's servants from trading, by engaging in salt contracts under the names of native Indians.

=== Scandal ===
A scandalous story about him is found in a rare book entitled The Intrigues of a Nabob; or Bengal the fittest Soil for the Growth of Lust, Injustice, and Dishonesty It alleges that Barwell had enticed away the writer's mistress, who passed at Calcutta for his wife and then discontinued an annuity promised to the writer as the price of his acquiescence. While member of council he was accused of deriving an illicit profit of 20,000 a year from certain salt contracts. His prosecution was ordered by the court of directors, but the proceedings fell through. In connection with this affair he fought a bloodless duel with General Clavering. Francis and Barwell were antagonists at the whist-table, where Francis is said to have won 20,000 at a sitting. In 1780, after a truce between Hastings and Francis, Barwell retired from the service.

=== Move to England ===
From India he allegedly brought back one of the largest fortunes ever accumulated. The phrase "Fetch more curricles" is associated with him. In 1781 he bought the estate of Stansted Park in Sussex from the trustees of the Earl of Halifax for 102,500 and subsequently added to his possessions in that county. He enlarged and remodelled Stansted House in a style of expense which contributed to exhaust the oriental treasures by which it was supplied.' As architects, Bonomi and James Wyatt were employed on the work for five years, while Capability Brown laid out the grounds. In 1781 Barwell was returned as tory M.P. for Helston, in 1784 for St Ives, and in 1790 and 1796 for Winchelsea.

In December 1796 he resigned from his parliamentary seat.

== Personal life ==
In 1776 he married a Miss Sanderson, the reigning beauty of Calcutta; but she died in November 1778, leaving one son. A portrait of Barwell, seated in his library with this son by his side, was painted by Sir Joshua Reynolds, and engraved in mezzotint by William Dickinson.

On 24 June 1785 he also married his second wife Catherine Coffin (1769-1847), the daughter of Elizabeth and Nathaniel Coffin, a customs official from Boston, Massachusetts. He also had three girls and a boy by his mistress 'Mrs Seaforth' (the assumed name of Rebecca Lyne)

He died at Stansted on 2 September 1804. Shortly after his death his estates in Sussex were sold by his trustees, one of whom was Sir Elijah Impey.

Parliament of Great Britain
Preceded by Jocelyn Deane; Philip Yorke	Member of Parliament for Helston; March 1781 – 1784; With: Philip Yorke to June 1781; Lord Hyde from June 1781	Succeeded by Lord Hyde; John Rogers
Preceded by Abel Smith; William Praed	Member of Parliament for St Ives; 1784–1790; With: William Praed	Succeeded by William Praed; William Mills
Preceded by John Nesbitt; William Nedham	Member of Parliament for Winchelsea; 1790 – December 1796; With: Viscount Barnard 1790–92; Sir Frederick Fletcher-Vane, Bt 1792–94; John Hiley Addington 1794 – May 1796; William Currie from May 1796	Succeeded by William Currie; William Devaynes
