= Philip Dehany =

British Member of Parliament

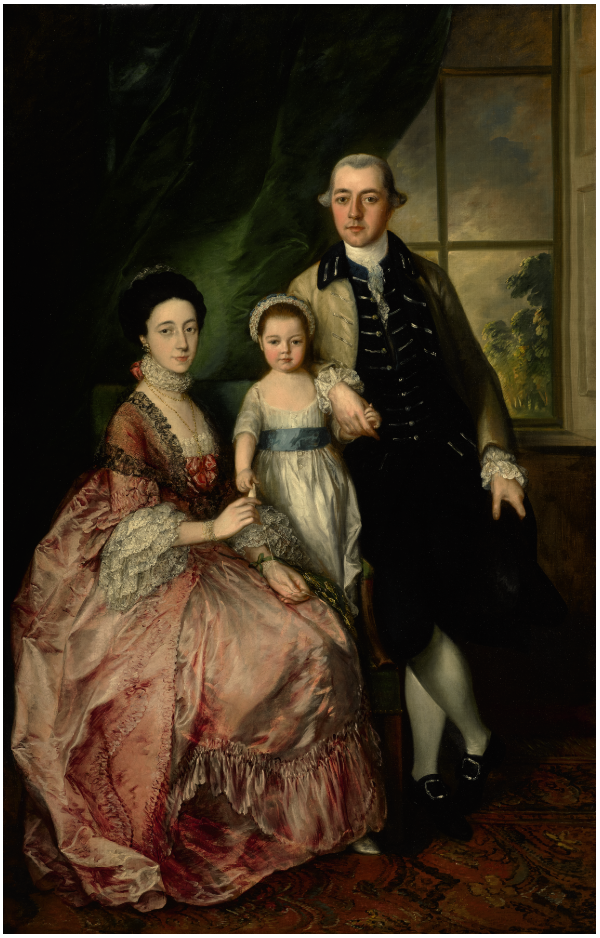

Philip Dehany (died 1809) was a West Indies plantation owner. He sat in the House of Commons from 1778 to 1780.

== Early life ==
Dehany was the eldest son of David Dehany, merchant of Bristol and planter of Jamaica, and his wife Mary Gregory, daughter of Matthew Gregory. He was educated at Westminster School and was admitted at Trinity College, Cambridge on 3 July 1752 aged 18. In 1754 he succeeded his father to the Point and Barbican sugar estates in Hanover, Jamaica.

== Political career ==
Dehany purchased Kempshott manor in about 1773. He demolished the old manor-house, and replaced it by a large brick mansion. Dehany maintained his links with the Powlett family down to Harry Powlett, 6th Duke of Bolton who had supported his West Indies friend Edward Morant in Parliament. Dehany was returned as Member of Parliament for St Ives on Bolton's interest at a by-election on 26 December 1778. However he did not stand at the 1780 general election two years later.

== Later years and legacy ==
Dehany married Margaret Salter Hooper and had a daughter - Mary Salter Dehany. Their group portrait was painted by Thomas Gainsborough. In 1787 he sold Kempshott. and in 1797 purchased Hayes Place, Kent. He died on 27 October 1809 and was buried at Hayes on 6 November 1809.

Parliament of Great Britain
Preceded by Thomas Wynn; Adam Drummond	Member of Parliament for St Ives; 1778 –1780; With: Thomas Wynn	Succeeded by William Praed; Abel Smith
