= Peter Moore (British politician) =

English civil servant and politician (1753–1828)

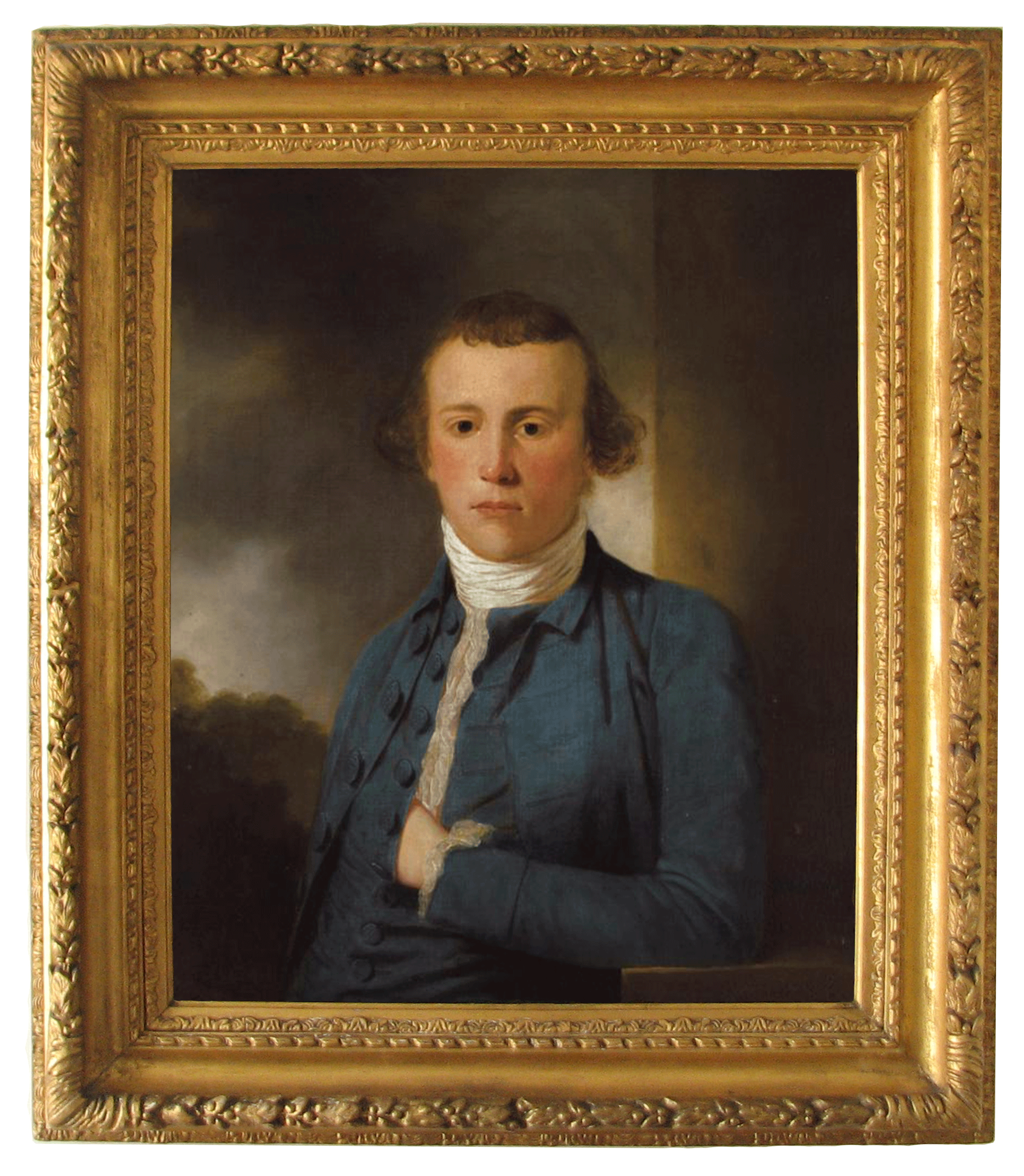
Peter Moore 'as a young man' by Tilly Kettle (1735-1786), oil on canvas, circa 1775

Peter Moore (12 February 1753 – 5 May 1828) was an English civil servant of the East India Company and politician.

== Life ==
Born at Sedbergh, then in Yorkshire, on 12 February 1753, Peter Moore was the fifth son of Edward Moore, LL.B., vicar of Over, Cheshire, and Mary his wife. He was educated locally at Sedbergh School. His father dying when he was quite young, he was later educated further by his eldest brother, Edward Moore, a barrister who had influence with Lord Holland and the Whig party. An appointment in the East India Company's service was found for him.

Moore returned to England a rich man, supplied material to Edmund Burke and Richard Brinsley Sheridan for their attack on Warren Hastings. He became a sort of whip for the radical section of the Whig party, while his manor-house at Hadley, Middlesex served as a rendezvous, with Sheridan a frequent visitor.

In 1796, Moore himself stood as parliamentary candidate for Tewkesbury, with Sir Philip Francis, and they obtained a majority of the householders in their favour; but were unseated on the House of Commons resolving that the free men and freeholders alone had a right to vote. In 1802, with Wilberforce Bird, he contested Coventry without success. One of the members, however, was unseated on petition, and Moore, after another contest, was returned on 30 March 1803. The initial cost of his seat was £25,000, but he was re-elected for Coventry in subsequent parliaments (29 October 1806, 11 May 1807, 5 October 1812, 25 June 1818, and 8 March 1820) at comparatively little expense.

Moore took a prominent part in the Westminster election of 1804, as the proposer of Charles James Fox, and many scurrilities were levelled against him. In 1806, when Fox was trying to form a ministry, Moore was selected as second on the Indian council, and was proposing to return to India when the king dissolved parliament. He continued in opposition, and frequently spoke in the house, supported Samuel Romilly and other advanced Whigs, and in 1807 voted in a minority of ten against the Duke of Wellington's Irish Insurrection Bill.

Moore was a member of the Beefsteak Club, and maintained close relations with leading Whigs. He had the memorial tablet placed above Sheridan's grave. He was also noted as promoter of the rebuilding of Drury Lane Theatre, where he served for some time on the management committee, the Highgate tunnel, and the floating of the Imperial Gas Light Company. He became known as a successful manager of private members bills of his time, and after the loss of his seat for Coventry in 1824 continued to promote them.

Company promotion eventually proved Moore's downfall, and in 1825 he left for Dieppe to escape arrest. He gave up nearly all his property for the benefit of persons who had lost money in companies with which he was associated, and spent the remainder of his days in writing memoirs, which remained unpublished.

Moore died at Abbeville in France on 5 May 1828. He is said to have been the last wearer of a pigtail in London society.

== Family ==
Moore married, in India, Sarah, one of the coheiresses of Colonel Richmond, alias Webb (the other became the wife of W. M. Thackeray, the grandfather of the novelist William Makepeace Thackeray). Their children included:

- George Peter Moore (baptized 25 May 1778 at St. John’s Church, Calcutta), who was returned for Queenborough in 1806, but vacated his seat at Fox's request, to make way for Romilly.
- Macartney Moore (born 7 June 1788; died 15 June 1831, the only son to survive the father, shortly after returning from India), who left two sons, Captain Richard Moore, R.N., and the Rev. Peter Halhed Moore, vicar of Chadkirk, Cheshire, and a daughter, who married Captain Gorle.

The art collector Godfrey Windus was a great-nephew.
