= Hillingdon Court =

Listed mansion in London, England

- Hillingdon Court, circa 1900

- Location within Greater London

General information
- Location: Hillingdon, Greater London, England
- Coordinates: 51.543111°N 0.460278°W
- Construction started: 1854
- Completed: 1858
- Client: Sir Charles Mills, 1st Baronet

Design and construction
- Architect: Philip Charles Hardwick

Hillingdon Court is a Grade II listed mansion in Hillingdon, within the London Borough of Hillingdon. Originally built in 1858 as the family home of the Mills family, the mansion has formed part of the ACS Hillingdon International School since 1978. Much of the remaining grounds came under public ownership in 1928 and have become public parkland and housing.

== History ==
=== Construction ===
Sir Charles Mills, partner in the London bank of Glyn, Mills & Co., bought two houses in rural Vine Lane in 1825, following his marriage to Emily Cox, daughter of the banker Richard Henry Cox. The Coxs had a house in Hillingdon. Mills had both houses demolished and the sites combined to allow for the construction of a new mansion. Designed by Philip Charles Hardwick, the mansion was built of white brick and stone between 1854 and 1858. Mills and ten members of his family lived there, with 33 servants.

Sir Charles' son, Charles Mills, 1st Baron Hillingdon, began purchasing the surrounding land following his creation as Baron Hillingdon in 1886. His holdings eventually reached 3,185 acres (12.9 km^{2}), which Baron Hillingdon used for shooting.

=== Sale ===
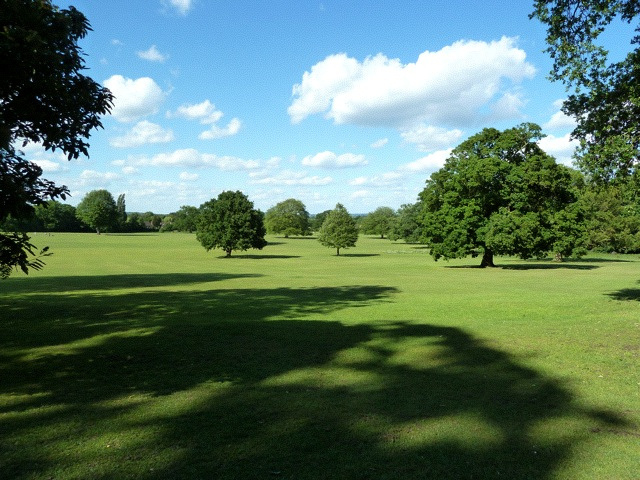
Hillingdon Court Park

In 1919, the second Baron Hillingdon, also Charles Mills, died, and the estate was put up for sale. Part of the estate was purchased by the Uxbridge Urban District on 31 March 1928 and became Hillingdon Court Park. The Roman Catholic order of the Sacred Heart purchased the mansion in 1920 for use as a nursing home for the elderly. While under the ownership of the order, the drawing room was used as a chapel.

During the Second World War, the mansion was damaged in a bombing raid in October 1940. Seven bombs fell on the building and grounds, with one falling directly down the well shaft in the central courtyard. Another penetrated a bedroom wall, waking the resident sleeping. The bomb failed to detonate, and the lady is recorded as having told staff it was time she headed to the air raid shelter.

=== Educational use ===
Following the end of the war, the house became a convent school for girls, which it remained until 1977. ACS International Schools purchased the mansion the following year and established a new campus school. New buildings adjoining the mansion were built in 1986, incorporating a gymnasium and cafeteria; a new wing was built in 1997.

Many of the original features of the mansion remain and have been restored under the ownership of ACS International Schools. The drawing room was restored to its original appearance when owned by the Mills, and the oak floor in the main reception room has had a protective cover fitted. The dining room has also been returned to its original appearance. A tunnel connecting the mansion to the tradesman's entrance, constructed to stop anyone inside the mansion from seeing tradesmen approaching or leaving, no longer exists.

The eight main rooms including bedrooms and dressing rooms on the middle floor were converted into classrooms for the school, while the basement which included two bedrooms, a coal cellar, a wine cellar, a gun room, and a boiler house, was also restored for the school's use.
