= Malcolm Pool =

Malcolm Pool (born 10 January 1943 in Hayes End, Middlesex) was the bassist with the 1960s R&B group The Artwoods from 1963, until the band split up in 1968.

Following the demise of The Artwoods, Pool joined a jazz band with Ted Wood, the middle brother between vocalist Art Wood and guitarist Ronnie Wood. The band performed at various gigs in and around London, with a Wednesday evening residency at the Kensington Hotel.

In 1969, Pool joined Accolade with Don Partridge, Gordon Giltrap, Brian Cresswell and Ian Hoyle. Accolade recorded one album in 1969. Pool left Accolade in 1970, after an incident when Partridge walked off stage during a tour of Sweden.

During April and May 1970, Pool played with Colosseum until a new bass player was found to replace Tony Reeves. He performed with Colosseum at the Hollywood Music Festival, Newcastle-under-Lyme on 24 May 1970.

Pool left the music industry in 1970, and joined Ted Wood, Art Wood and Jim Willis at West Four Design, a graphic design partnership. Following various catastrophes, West Four Design folded in 1975. Pool moved with Art Wood and Willis to North Road Press, where a new design studio was set up.

In 1983, Pool set up his own studio in Hillingdon, working there until 1992, when he joined Denton Wilde Sapte to set up and run an in-house design studio. Malcolm Pool married twice, and has five children.

Pool retired in 2004, and now lives with his wife in South West Scotland.

In 2007, Pool joined Derek Griffiths, Colin Martin and Jon Lord at an Artwoods reunion at the ART Tribute night, at York House in Twickenham. Ali Mackenzie took over Art Wood's role on vocals, and Chris Hunt played drums. They were joined on stage by guitarist Ronnie Wood and vocalist Geno Washington.
