= The Artwoods =

British band (1964–1967)

- Origin: London, England
- Genres: R&B
- Years active: 1964–1967
- Labels: Decca, Parlophone, Repertoire, Spark
- Past members: Art Wood; Derek Griffiths; Malcolm Pool; Keef Hartley; Jon Lord; Colin Martin

The Artwoods (also sometimes known by Decca Records as the Art Woods) were a British rhythm and blues band who formed in 1963 and were professionally active between 1964 and 1967. They were a popular live attraction, rivalling groups such as the Animals, although, despite releasing a clutch of singles and an album, their record sales never reflected this popularity.

== History ==
Singer Arthur Wood, from whom the band took their name, was the eldest brother of Ronnie Wood (who later found fame with the Faces and Rolling Stones). Art Wood had been a vocalist with Alexis Korner's Blues Incorporated for a short period during 1962, simultaneously fronting his own group, the Art Wood Combo. When keyboardist Jon Lord and guitarist Derek Griffiths from Red Bludd's Bluesicians joined the Art Wood Combo, the Artwoods were formed. With Keef Hartley, formerly with Rory Storm & the Hurricanes, joining on drums and Malcolm Pool from the Roadrunners joining as bassist, in December 1964 the band turned professional, securing a residency at London's 100 Club and signing a recording contract with Decca Records. Colin Martin joined from the band the Ingoes, who changed their name to the Blossom Toes. Martin went on to work at BBC Radio 2 where he produced Terry Wogan, Ken Bruce and Gloria Hunniford, and was later appointed as Head of Music at the station.

The intended debut single, a cover of Muddy Waters' "Hoochie Coochie Man", was shelved in favour of a rendition of an old Lead Belly song, "Sweet Mary". Although it did not reach the charts, it received sufficient airplay to bring the band much live work, including an appearance on the first live edition of Ready Steady Go!. Their second record, "Oh My Love", was another blues cover. Like its predecessor (and subsequent releases), it failed to chart. Their only chart single was "I Take What I Want", which reached No. 28 on 8 May 1966. The Artwoods were one of the few British bands of the era to play behind the Iron Curtain as they toured Poland in 1966, with Lord's then-girlfriend Elkie Brooks as opener.

=== As St. Valentine's Day Massacre ===
The Artwoods were dropped by Decca at the end of 1966, and they signed a one-record deal with Parlophone, but their release "What Shall I Do" also had no success. Later in 1967, a final "one-off" single appeared on the Fontana label, with the band billing itself as St. Valentine's Day Massacre; but by the time of its release the Artwoods had effectively ceased to exist.

== Critical reception and post-band activity ==
Bruce Eder of AllMusic noted that the Artwoods' early records today stand up well against the work of more successful groups such as the Rolling Stones, the Yardbirds or the Birds (who included Art's younger brother Ronnie). But at the time they came out, despite appearances on programmes such as Ready, Steady, Go! their singles never seemed to connect with the record-buying public. The group broke up in mid-1967. Art Wood joined his brother Ted in the graphics-art business and continued to perform music on a semi-professional basis. He also played with the Downliners Sect. Keef Hartley went on to play with John Mayall's Bluesbreakers and Jon Lord became a founding member of Deep Purple.

Over the years, there have been three compilations released by the band. In 1983, 100 Oxford Street, including most of their mid-1960s singles and seven songs from Art Gallery, was released by Edsel Records. In 2000, Singles A's & B's, comprising the group's entire single and EP output, was released by Repertoire Records. And in 2014, Steady Gettin' It – The Complete Recordings 1964–67, a 3-CD box set (including their BBC sessions and a 1967 Denmark concert) was released by RPM Records.

== Band members ==
- Art Wood – lead vocals (born Arthur Wood, 6 June 1937, in West Drayton, Middlesex; died 3 November 2006, in London)
- Derek Griffiths – lead guitar (born Derek Charles Griffiths, 23 June 1944, in England)
- Jon Lord – organ (born John Douglas Lord, 9 June 1941, in Leicester, Leicestershire; died 16 July 2012)
- Malcolm Pool – bass guitar (born 10 January 1943, in Hayes End, Middlesex)
- Keef Hartley – drums (born Keith Hartley, 8 March 1944, in Preston, Lancashire, died 26 November 2011)
- Colin Martin – drums (born 18 March 1945, in Leyton, East London)

== Discography ==
=== Albums ===
- Art Gallery (Decca, LK4830) Nov 1966
- Art Gallery [Reissue] (Repertoire, REP4533-WP) 1995

=== Live albums ===
- Live at Klooks Kleek (Diamond) 2016
- Art's Gallery (Top Sounds) 2019

=== Compilation albums ===
- The Artwoods (Spark, SRLM2006) 1974
- 100 Oxford Street (Edsel, ED107) 1983
- Singles A's & B's (Repertoire, REP4887) 2000
- Steady Gettin' It – The Complete Recordings 1964–67 (RPM, BX524) 2014

=== EPs ===
- Oh My Love ["Oh My Love" / "Big City" / "If I Ever Get My Hands on You" / "Sweet Mary"] (Decca 457.076) Jul 1965 [France]
- The Artwoods ["I Take What I Want" / "If I Ever Get My Hands on You" / "I Feel Good" / "She Knows What to Do"] (Decca DFE 8576) Reissue, 2010 [Japan]
- Jazz in Jeans ["These Boots Are Made for Walkin'" / "A Taste of Honey" / "Our Man Flint" / "Routine"] (Decca DFE 8654) Apr 1966 [UK]

=== Singles ===
- "Sweet Mary" / "If I Ever Get My Hands on You" (Decca F 12015) Nov 1964
- "Oh My Love" / "Big City" (Decca F 12091) Feb 1965
- "Goodbye Sisters" / "She Knows What to Do" (Decca F 12206) Aug 1965
- "I Take What I Want" / "I'm Looking for a Saxophonist Doubling French Horn Wearing Size 37 Boots" (Decca F 12384) Apr 1966
- "I Feel Good" / "Molly Anderson's Cookery Book" (Decca F 12465) Aug 1966
- "What Shall I Do" / "In the Deep End" (Parlophone R 5590) Apr 1967
- "Brother Can You Spare a Dime" / "Al's Party" (Fontana H 883) Nov 1967 (as St. Valentine's Day Massacre)
