= Sir Richard Glyn, 1st Baronet, of Gaunt's House =

British banker and politician

Sir Richard Carr Glyn, 1st Baronet (2 February 1755 – 27 April 1838) was a British banker and politician.

Glyn was the son of Sir Richard Glyn, 1st Baronet, by his second wife Elizabeth (née Carr). He was educated at Westminster School and on his father's death in 1773 became a partner in his late father's bank, "Vere, Glyn and Hallifax", renamed as "Hallifax, Mills, Glyn and Mitton".

He was elected an Alderman of Bishopsgate, 1790 to 1829, and of Bridge without, from 1829 till his resignation in 1835. He served as Sheriff of London in 1790 and was knighted that same year. In 1798 he was elected Lord Mayor of London, a post previously held by his father, and made a baronet (of Gaunt's House in the County of Dorset) the following year.

He represented St Ives in Parliament from 1796 to 1802.

Glyn married Mary Jane (23 Oct 1760 – 2 Aug 1832), daughter of John Plumtre, in 1785. They had several children including:

- Mary Elizabeth (18 May 1786 – 17 Jan 1864)
- Richard Plumbtree (13 Jun 1787 – 20 Dec 1863)
- Robert Thomas John (5 Sep 1788 – 27 Mar 1836)
- Thomas Christopher (5 Oct 1789 – 19 Aug 1827)
- John Carr (1791–1791)
- George Carr (27 Mar 1797 – 24 Jul 1873)
- Carr John (25 Jun 1799 – 25 Oct 1896)
- Elizabeth (1802-10 Jan 1805)

He died in April 1838, aged 83, and was succeeded in the baronetcy by his eldest son Richard. Glyn's fourth son George became a prominent banker and was elevated to the peerage as Baron Wolverton in 1869.

== Notes ==
Parliament of Great Britain
Preceded by William Praed; William Mills	Member of Parliament for St Ives; 1796–1801; With: William Praed	Succeeded by Parliament of the United Kingdom
Parliament of the United Kingdom
Preceded by Parliament of Great Britain	Member of Parliament for St Ives; 1801–1802; With: William Praed	Succeeded by William Praed; Jonathan Raine
Civic offices
Preceded by John William Anderson	Lord Mayor of London; 1798–1799	Succeeded by Harvey Christian Combe
Baronetage of Great Britain
New creation	Baronet (of Gaunt's House); 1800–1838	Succeeded by Richard Plumptre Glyn
