= Glyn, Mills & Co. =

UK business

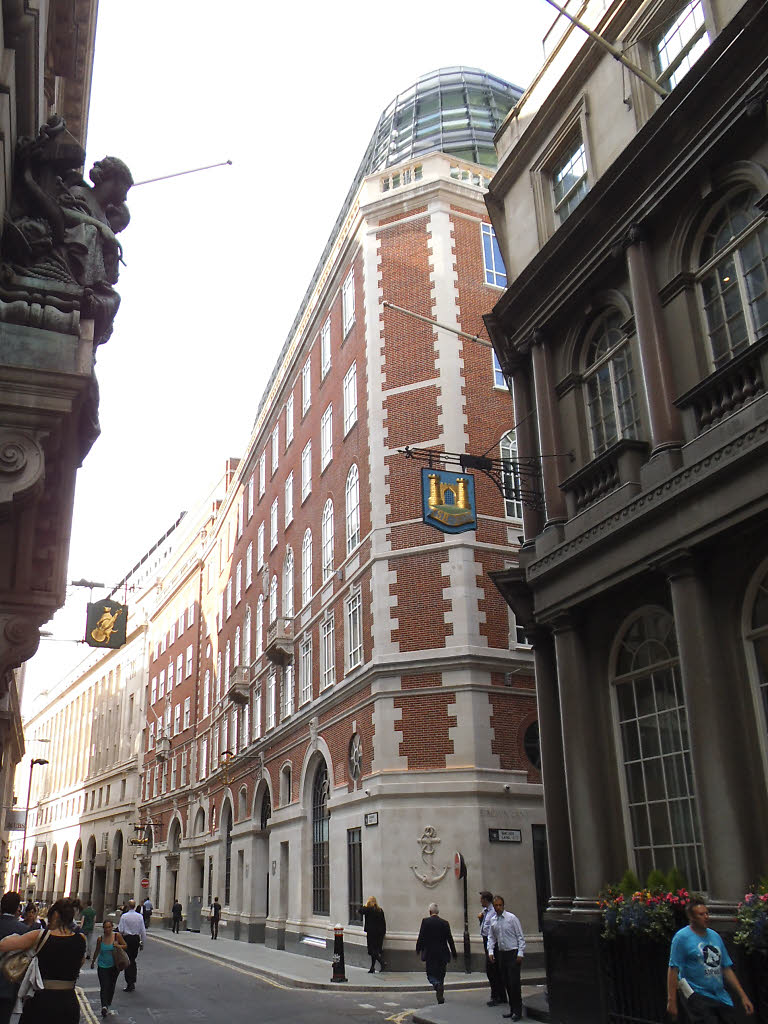
- The building at 67 Lombard Street still shows the sign of the anchor
- Industry: financial service activities, except insurance and pension funding
- Founded: 1753
- Defunct: 1969
- Fate: Integrated into the Royal Bank of Scotland
- Headquarters: London

Glyn, Mills & Company was a private bank founded in London in 1753, which existed until 1969, when it became part of the Royal Bank of Scotland.

== History ==
=== Early history ===
The bank was founded under the name Vere, Glyn & Hallifax. Joseph Vere was an experienced banker who was a member of the Goldsmiths Company and had been involved with earlier banking partnerships; Richard Glyn had been a prominent London drysalter with widespread merchanting connections; and Thomas Hallifax was the son of a Barnsley clockmaker who had become chief clerk at Martins Bank. Unlike many of the private London banks that relied on wealthy and titled customers, Glyn, Mills was originally a commercial institution; railway companies, the Sun Insurance and the Hudson's Bay Company were leading customers.

Night safe

Vere died in 1766 leaving Glyn and Hallifax as partners; they traded satisfactorily until the financial panic of 1772 when the Bank had to stop payment for some weeks and narrowly avoided bankruptcy. One of those who provided temporary finance for the Bank was Sir John Salter, one-time Lord Mayor of London, but only on condition that his son-in-law, William Mills, could enter the partnership. When the Bank reopened it did so as Glyn, Hallifax and Mills. It was still of modest size: the number of staff was no more than seven in 1790, but over the next 40 years it rose to 51. The last Hallifax family member in the Bank died in 1850 and the bank became Glyn, Mills & Co.

=== Acquisition of Currie's ===
Conscious of the need to enlarge its financial resources, in 1864 the bank acquired another London private bank, Currie's (see Raikes Currie), and the firm became known as Glyn, Mills, Currie & Co – a name that was maintained until 1923. The ownership of the bank was determined by family group and not individuals: the Glyn and Mills families were entitled to two-fifths each and the Currie family, one-fifth. Two years later, in 1866, a group of Scottish banks agreed to purchase half the capital of Glyn Mills in order to obtain a seat in the London Bankers' Clearing House, but the collapse of Overend Gurney prevented the implementation of the deal.

In 1885, Glyn, Mills took the unprecedented step for a private bank of producing half-yearly balance sheets. It showed that the bank's was larger than popularly realised, "only rivalled by two or three of the largest joint-stock banks". The bank's size and prestige was demonstrated by the collapse of Barings Bank in 1890. Betrand Currie led the investigation into Barings' affairs at the instigation of the Bank of England and was the largest contributor outside the Bank of England to the rescue fund, undertaking to contribute £500,000 provided that Rothschilds did the same.

=== Acquisition of Holt's and Child's ===
Faced with the growing power of the “big five” banks after the First World War Glyn Mills made its own acquisitions – Holt & Co. in 1923 (briefly becoming Glyn, Mills Currie Holt & Co) and Child & Co. in 1924 when the name reverted to Glyn Mills & Co. Holt's were army agents in Whitehall which in turn supported a private banking business. It was founded in 1809 by William Kirkland who opened an office in St James's. Regiments were gradually added to Holt's portfolio and the Navy agency of Woodhead and Co. was absorbed in 1915.

Child's history predated that of the Bank of England and for over 100 years it had been owned by the Earl of Jersey. Following the death of Lord Jersey, the executors were told that the Bank of England would not permit a sale to one of the Big Five. Glyn's, the largest private bank and the sole survivor of the private banks in the Clearing House, seemed the most desirable association.

=== Purchased by Royal Bank of Scotland ===
In 1932, the original buildings were replaced by a new building, designed by Sir Herbert Baker. The approach of the Second World War threatened the viability of the private bank with the prospect of casualties and death duties straining capital resources. In 1939 the partners agreed to the bank's sale to the Royal Bank of Scotland. Glyn Mills continued to trade separately, even to the point of acquiring the banking businesses of the British Overseas Bank and Anglo-International Bank in 1944, and of A Ruffer & Sons in 1946. However, in 1969 the Royal Bank of Scotland was restructured and the holding company's subsidiaries in England and Wales (Glyn, Mills & Co., Williams Deacon's Bank, and the English and Welsh branches of The National Bank) were merged to form Williams & Glyn's Bank.
