= 2014 Camden London Borough Council election =

2014 local election in England

2014 Camden Council election
| ← 2010 | 22 May 2014 | 2018 → |

All 54 seats to Camden London Borough Council 27 seats needed for a majority

| | First party | Second party |
|---|---|---|
| Leader | Sarah Hayward | Claire-Louise Leyland |
| Party | Labour | Conservative |
| Leader since | 2012 | 2013 |
| Leader's seat | King's Cross | Belsize |
| Last election | 30 seats, 33.5% | 10 seats, 24.4% |
| Seats won | 40 | 12 |
| Seat change | ▲10 | ▲2 |
| Popular vote | 27,265 | 13,503 |
| Percentage | 43.0% | 21.3% |
| Swing | ▲9.5% | ▼3.1% |
| | Third party | Fourth party |
| Leader | Maya De Souza | Keith Moffitt |
| Party | Green | Liberal Democrats |
| Leader since | 2010 | 2005 |
| Leader's seat | Highgate (did not re-stand) | West Hampstead (lost) |
| Last election | 1 seat, 11.5% | 13 seats, 29.5% |
| Seats won | 1 | 1 |
| Seat change | Steady | ▼12 |
| Popular vote | 10,124 | 9,902 |
| Percentage | 16.0% | 15.6% |
| Swing | ▲4.5% | ▼13.9% |
- Map of the results of the 2014 Camden council election. Conservatives in blue, Greens in green, Labour in red and Liberal Democrats in yellow.

The 2014 Camden Council election took place on 22 May 2014 to elect members of Camden Council in London. This was on the same day as other local elections.

== Election result ==
Camden local election result 2014
| Party | Seats | Gains | Losses | Net gain/loss | Seats % | Votes % | Votes | +/− |
|---|---|---|---|---|---|---|---|---|
| Labour | 40 | 10 | 0 | +10 | 74.1 | 43.0 | 27,265 | +9.5 |
| Conservative | 12 | 2 | 0 | +2 | 22.2 | 21.3 | 13,503 | -3.1 |
| Green | 1 | 0 | 0 | 0 | 1.9 | 16.0 | 10,124 | +4.5 |
| Liberal Democrats | 1 | 0 | 12 | -12 | 1.9 | 15.6 | 9,902 | -13.9 |
| UKIP | 0 | 0 | 0 | 0 | 0.0 | 2.8 | 1,764 | +2.5 |
| Independent | 0 | 0 | 0 | 0 | 0.0 | 1.0 | 648 | +0.8 |
| TUSC | 0 | 0 | 0 | 0 | 0.0 | 0.3 | 177 | n/a |

== Ward results ==
=== Belsize ===
Belsize (3)
| Party | Candidate | Votes | % | ±% |
|---|---|---|---|---|
| Conservative | Jonny Bucknell* | 1,219 | 37.3 | +1.2 |
| Conservative | Claire-Louise Leyland * | 1,157 | 35.4 | −0.7 |
| Conservative | Leila Roy | 1,016 | 31.1 | −3.7 |
| Liberal Democrats | Tom Simon* | 992 | 30.3 | −5.4 |
| Labour | Madeleine Jennings | 939 | 28.7 | +8.6 |
| Labour | James McGowan | 782 | 23.9 | +4.6 |
| Liberal Democrats | Bradley Hillier-Smith | 760 | 23.2 | −8.8 |
| Labour | Harunur Rashid | 709 | 21.7 | +2.9 |
| Liberal Democrats | Lawrence Nicholson | 678 | 20.7 | −11.0 |
| Green | Rowan St Clair | 275 | 8.4 | +0.9 |
| Green | Darren Murphy | 269 | 8.2 | +1.4 |
| Green | Stuart Taylor | 243 | 7.4 | +1.4 |
| Independent | Nigel Rumble | 199 | 6.1 | −28.7 |
| Turnout | | 9,257 | 38.3 | −24.0 |
| Conservative hold | | Swing | | |
| Conservative hold | | Swing | | |
| Conservative gain from Liberal Democrats | | Swing | | |

=== Bloomsbury ===
Bloomsbury (3)
| Party | Candidate | Votes | % | ±% |
|---|---|---|---|---|
| Labour | Adam Harrison* | 1,295 | 50.2 | +10.1 |
| Labour | Sabrina Francis | 1,271 | 49.3 | +12.0 |
| Labour | Rishi Madlani | 1,226 | 47.5 | +16.0 |
| Conservative | Timothy Barnes | 608 | 23.6 | −3.8 |
| Conservative | Andrew Keep | 536 | 20.8 | −8.5 |
| Conservative | Sarah Macken | 489 | 19.0 | −3.1 |
| Green | Dee Searle | 419 | 16.2 | +1.8 |
| Green | Samuel Gage | 396 | 15.4 | +5.5 |
| Green | Shana Tufail | 341 | 13.2 | +3.3 |
| UKIP | Giles Game | 219 | 8.5 | N/A |
| Liberal Democrats | Aimery De Malet | 212 | 8.2 | −14.7 |
| Liberal Democrats | Hammad Baig | 185 | 7.2 | −18.2 |
| Liberal Democrats | Stanley Grossman | 167 | 6.5 | −9.0 |
| Turnout | | 7,385 | 33.1 | |
| Labour hold | | Swing | | |
| Labour hold | | Swing | | |
| Labour hold | | Swing | | |

=== Camden Town with Primrose Hill ===
Camden Town with Primrose Hill (3)
| Party | Candidate | Votes | % | ±% |
|---|---|---|---|---|
| Labour | Pat Callaghan * | 2,005 | 58.4 | +15.3 |
| Labour | Lazzaro Pietragnoli * | 1,608 | 46.8 | +16.3 |
| Labour | Richard Cotton | 1,542 | 44.9 | +14.6 |
| Conservative | Rory Manley | 655 | 19.1 | −3.3 |
| Green | Nicola Hart | 641 | 18.7 | +8.4 |
| Conservative | Chris Kassapis | 609 | 17.7 | −0.7 |
| Green | Daniel Rosenbaum | 601 | 17.5 | +7.4 |
| Conservative | Richard Merrin | 567 | 16.5 | −3.8 |
| Green | Ben Van Der Velde | 455 | 13.2 | +3.3 |
| Liberal Democrats | Sarah Hoyle | 309 | 9.0 | −22.9 |
| Liberal Democrats | Juniour Blake | 295 | 8.6 | −21.0 |
| Independent | Phil Cowan | 287 | 8.4 | N/A |
| Liberal Democrats | Mukul Hira | 255 | 7.4 | −18.9 |
| Turnout | | 9,847 | 38.0 | |
| Labour hold | | Swing | | |
| Labour hold | | Swing | | |
| Labour gain from Liberal Democrats | | Swing | | |

=== Cantelowes ===
Cantelowes (3)
| Party | Candidate | Votes | % | ±% |
|---|---|---|---|---|
| Labour | Danny Beales | 2,002 | 56.1 | +23.1 |
| Labour | Phil Jones * | 1,966 | 55.1 | +16.1 |
| Labour | Angela Mason * | 1,899 | 53.3 | +13.2 |
| Liberal Democrats | Paul Braithwaite * | 725 | 20.3 | −17.2 |
| Green | Fran Bury | 639 | 17.9 | +3.7 |
| Green | Fiona Firman | 632 | 17.7 | +8.8 |
| Green | Victoria Green | 546 | 15.3 | +9.1 |
| Conservative | Robyn Gardner | 375 | 10.5 | −3.0 |
| Conservative | Robert Ricketts | 361 | 10.1 | −3.2 |
| Liberal Democrats | Margaret Jackson-Roberts | 355 | 10.0 | −22.0 |
| Conservative | Will Timmins | 346 | 9.7 | −2.3 |
| Liberal Democrats | Catherine Jones | 344 | 9.6 | −19.1 |
| Turnout | | 10,221 | 40.6 | |
| Labour hold | | Swing | | |
| Labour hold | | Swing | | |
| Labour gain from Liberal Democrats | | Swing | | |

=== Fortune Green ===
Fortune Green (3)
| Party | Candidate | Votes | % | ±% |
|---|---|---|---|---|
| Liberal Democrats | Flick Rea* | 1,151 | 35.0 | −5.6 |
| Labour | Lorna Russell | 1,028 | 31.3 | +8.2 |
| Labour | Richard Olszewski | 967 | 29.4 | +6.6 |
| Liberal Democrats | Nancy Jirira* | 950 | 28.9 | −5.3 |
| Labour | Phil Turner | 904 | 27.5 | +5.0 |
| Conservative | Ian Cohen | 893 | 27.2 | +1.5 |
| Liberal Democrats | Nick Russell | 865 | 26.3 | −10.0 |
| Conservative | Andrew Parkinson | 739 | 22.5 | −3.1 |
| Conservative | Tom Smith | 686 | 20.9 | −4.5 |
| Green | Leila Mars | 403 | 12.3 | +0.9 |
| Green | Juan Jimenez | 326 | 9.9 | −0.4 |
| Green | Lucy Oldfield | 318 | 9.7 | +4.2 |
| Turnout | | 9246 | 39.2 | |
| Liberal Democrats hold | | Swing | | |
| Labour gain from Liberal Democrats | | Swing | | |
| Labour gain from Liberal Democrats | | Swing | | |

=== Frognal and Fitzjohns ===
Frognal and Fitzjohns (3)
| Party | Candidate | Votes | % | ±% |
|---|---|---|---|---|
| Conservative | Siobhan Baillie | 1,497 | 55.0 | +2.0 |
| Conservative | Andrew Mennear * | 1,428 | 52.4 | +4.3 |
| Conservative | Gio Spinella * | 1,352 | 49.7 | −0.6 |
| Labour | Jack Boardman | 606 | 22.3 | +3.9 |
| Labour | Richard Salmon | 512 | 18.8 | +1.2 |
| Labour | Mazida Khatun | 481 | 17.7 | +3.1 |
| Green | Charles Harris | 411 | 15.1 | +7.9 |
| Green | Edward Ross | 363 | 13.3 | +6.4 |
| Green | Stephen West | 312 | 11.5 | +4.5 |
| Liberal Democrats | David Bouchier | 294 | 10.8 | −12.4 |
| Liberal Democrats | Anne Ward | 284 | 10.4 | −10.7 |
| Liberal Democrats | Erich Wagner | 187 | 6.9 | −10.5 |
| Turnout | | 7,738 | 33.7 | |
| Conservative hold | | Swing | | |
| Conservative hold | | Swing | | |
| Conservative hold | | Swing | | |

=== Gospel Oak ===
Gospel Oak (3)
| Party | Candidate | Votes | % | ±% |
|---|---|---|---|---|
| Labour | Theo Blackwell* | 1,687 | 51.7 | +13.1 |
| Labour | Maeve McCormack* | 1,590 | 48.8 | +9.2 |
| Labour | Larraine Revah* | 1,534 | 47.1 | +11.2 |
| Conservative | Steve Adams | 634 | 19.4 | −6.2 |
| Conservative | Peter Horne | 551 | 16.9 | −9.5 |
| Green | Jane Walby | 549 | 16.8 | +5.1 |
| Green | Constantin Buhayer | 527 | 16.2 | +4.4 |
| Conservative | Sangita Singh | 456 | 14.0 | −13.9 |
| Green | James Marshall | 429 | 13.2 | +2.4 |
| UKIP | Barry Leavers | 361 | 11.1 | N/A |
| Liberal Democrats | Roger Hughes | 248 | 7.6 | −14.2 |
| Liberal Democrats | Laura Noel | 245 | 7.5 | −12.3 |
| Liberal Democrats | Kevin Sefton | 158 | 4.8 | −12.1 |
| TUSC | John Reid | 110 | 3.4 | N/A |
| Turnout | | | | |
| Labour hold | | Swing | | |
| Labour hold | | Swing | | |
| Labour hold | | Swing | | |

=== Hampstead Town ===
Hampstead Town (3)
| Party | Candidate | Votes | % | ±% |
|---|---|---|---|---|
| Conservative | Simon Marcus* | 1,465 | 43.3 | +2.4 |
| Conservative | Stephen Stark | 1,380 | 40.8 | +4.5 |
| Conservative | Tom Currie | 1,272 | 37.6 | −1.4 |
| Liberal Democrats | Linda Chung* | 1,148 | 33.9 | −5.8 |
| Labour | Rachael Agnew | 726 | 21.5 | +1.4 |
| Labour | Maddy Raman | 711 | 21.0 | +7.3 |
| Labour | Luca Salice | 609 | 18.0 | +4.8 |
| Liberal Democrats | James Newsome | 575 | 17.0 | −15.1 |
| Liberal Democrats | Robert Carruthers | 542 | 16.0 | −14.4 |
| Green | Sophie Dix | 512 | 15.1 | +5.6 |
| Green | Maisie King | 365 | 10.8 | +4.5 |
| Green | Prashant Vaze | 288 | 8.5 | +3.0 |
| Turnout | | 9,604 | 43.7 | |
| Conservative hold | | Swing | | |
| Conservative gain from Liberal Democrats | | Swing | | |
| Conservative hold | | Swing | | |

=== Haverstock ===
Haverstock (3)
| Party | Candidate | Votes | % | ±% |
|---|---|---|---|---|
| Labour | Alison Kelly | 1,707 | 46.8 | +6.4 |
| Labour | Abdul Quadir | 1,578 | 43.2 | +4.6 |
| Labour | Abi Wood | 1,462 | 40.1 | +4.3 |
| Liberal Democrats | Jill Fraser* | 1,081 | 29.6 | −17.4 |
| Liberal Democrats | Matt Sanders* | 976 | 26.7 | −15.9 |
| Liberal Democrats | Rahel Bokth* | 913 | 25.0 | −16.5 |
| Green | Charlotte Collins | 456 | 12.5 | +4.6 |
| Green | Una Sapietis | 361 | 9.9 | +2.2 |
| Green | Andre Lopez-Turner | 356 | 9.8 | +4.0 |
| Conservative | Stephen Daughton | 351 | 9.6 | +1.3 |
| Conservative | Nathan Davidson | 339 | 9.3 | +1.3 |
| UKIP | Christopher Cooke | 315 | 8.6 | N/A |
| Conservative | Carole Ricketts | 291 | 8.0 | +0.4 |
| Turnout | | 10,206 | 42.5 | |
| Labour gain from Liberal Democrats | | Swing | | |
| Labour gain from Liberal Democrats | | Swing | | |
| Labour gain from Liberal Democrats | | Swing | | |

=== Highgate ===
Highgate (3)
| Party | Candidate | Votes | % | ±% |
|---|---|---|---|---|
| Labour | Sally Gimson* | 1,739 | 43.1 | +14.1 |
| Labour | Oliver Lewis | 1,664 | 41.2 | +12.8 |
| Green | Siân Berry | 1,642 | 40.7 | +7.7 |
| Labour | Valerie Leach* | 1,567 | 38.8 | +7.4 |
| Green | Matthew Johnston | 1,252 | 31.0 | +5.4 |
| Green | Robert McCracken | 1,099 | 27.2 | +4.4 |
| Conservative | Beth Charlesworth | 763 | 18.9 | −2.7 |
| Conservative | Will Blair | 727 | 18.0 | −3.9 |
| Conservative | Will Dilnott-Cooper | 662 | 16.4 | −4.9 |
| Liberal Democrats | Henry Potts | 232 | 5.7 | −16.2 |
| Liberal Democrats | Martin Hay | 198 | 4.9 | −13.4 |
| Liberal Democrats | Martin Wright | 130 | 3.2 | −13.3 |
| Turnout | | 11,702 | 50.0 | |
| Labour hold | | Swing | | |
| Labour hold | | Swing | | |
| Green hold | | Swing | | |

=== Holborn and Covent Garden ===
Holborn and Covent Garden (3)
| Party | Candidate | Votes | % | ±% |
|---|---|---|---|---|
| Labour | Julian Fulbrook* | 1,844 | 58.2 | +11.6 |
| Labour | Sue Vincent* | 1,714 | 54.1 | +14.3 |
| Labour | Awale Olad* | 1,588 | 50.1 | +13.6 |
| Conservative | Alison Frost | 635 | 20.0 | −6.1 |
| Conservative | Lewis Barber | 601 | 19.0 | −4.9 |
| Conservative | Daniel Nesbitt | 576 | 18.2 | −5.3 |
| Green | Niki Brain | 480 | 15.1 | +2.5 |
| Green | Eve Mullen | 458 | 14.4 | +4.7 |
| Green | Anthony Quinn | 357 | 11.3 | +3.1 |
| Liberal Democrats | Jeremy Allen | 222 | 7.0 | −14.6 |
| Liberal Democrats | David Simmons | 196 | 6.2 | −10.3 |
| Liberal Democrats | Ken Wright | 181 | 5.7 | −10.6 |
| Independent | Robert Carlyle | 162 | 5.1 | +1.4 |
| Turnout | | 9,046 | 35.5 | |
| Labour hold | | Swing | | |
| Labour hold | | Swing | | |
| Labour hold | | Swing | | |

=== Kentish Town ===
Kentish Town (3)
| Party | Candidate | Votes | % | ±% |
|---|---|---|---|---|
| Labour | Jenny Headlam-Wells* | 2,165 | 55.5 | +18.7 |
| Labour | Georgia Gould* | 2,076 | 53.2 | +14.6 |
| Labour | Meric Apak* | 1,992 | 51.0 | +16.1 |
| Green | Jack Parker | 882 | 22.6 | +3.2 |
| Green | Alaa Owaineh | 818 | 21.0 | +9.8 |
| Green | George Houghton | 738 | 18.9 | +3.7 |
| Conservative | Doreen Bartlett | 452 | 11.6 | −1.6 |
| Conservative | Darryl Davies | 427 | 10.9 | −1.2 |
| Conservative | Paul Barton | 397 | 10.2 | −2.0 |
| Liberal Democrats | Judy Dixey | 375 | 9.6 | −23.6 |
| Liberal Democrats | Omar Ali | 304 | 7.8 | −23.9 |
| UKIP | Maxine Spencer | 287 | 7.4 | N/A |
| Liberal Democrats | Valdir Francisco | 195 | 5.0 | −23.4 |
| Turnout | | 11,128 | 40.8 | |
| Labour hold | | Swing | | |
| Labour hold | | Swing | | |
| Labour hold | | Swing | | |

=== Kilburn ===
Kilburn (3)
| Party | Candidate | Votes | % | ±% |
|---|---|---|---|---|
| Labour | Douglas Beattie | 1,661 | 50.3 | +14.3 |
| Labour | Maryam Eslamdoust* | 1,611 | 48.8 | +13.4 |
| Labour | Thomas Gardiner* | 1,543 | 46.7 | +6.2 |
| Liberal Democrats | James King | 883 | 26.7 | −2.9 |
| Liberal Democrats | Janet Grauberg | 876 | 26.5 | −6.1 |
| Liberal Democrats | Jack Holroyde | 746 | 22.6 | −5.7 |
| Conservative | Nick Vose | 411 | 12.5 | −8.4 |
| Conservative | Tim Wainwright | 409 | 12.4 | −7.6 |
| Green | Sarah Astor | 402 | 12.2 | +4.5 |
| Conservative | John Whitehead | 357 | 10.8 | −5.2 |
| Green | Sheila Hayman | 286 | 8.7 | +1.5 |
| Green | Richard Bourn | 276 | 8.4 | +1.9 |
| Turnout | | 9,483 | 38.3% | |
| Labour hold | | Swing | | |
| Labour hold | | Swing | | |
| Labour hold | | Swing | | |

=== King's Cross ===
King's Cross (3)
| Party | Candidate | Votes | % | ±% |
|---|---|---|---|---|
| Labour | Sarah Hayward* | 1,467 | 55.7 | +14.4 |
| Labour | Abdul Hai* | 1,424 | 54.0 | +15.8 |
| Labour | Jonathan Simpson* | 1,333 | 50.6 | +13.0 |
| Green | Brian Gascoigne | 550 | 20.9 | +10.7 |
| Green | Dominic Kendrick | 459 | 17.4 | +7.8 |
| Green | Lewis Sullivan | 446 | 16.9 | +9.4 |
| Conservative | Adam Lester | 431 | 16.4 | −0.9 |
| Conservative | Ivan Massow | 403 | 15.3 | −1.3 |
| Conservative | Patsy Prince | 401 | 15.2 | −0.5 |
| Liberal Democrats | Elizabeth Jones | 263 | 10.0 | −24.6 |
| Liberal Democrats | Jon Burden | 236 | 9.0 | −22.0 |
| Liberal Democrats | Michael Skinner | 195 | 7.4 | −21.3 |
| Turnout | | 7631 | 34.5 | |
| Labour hold | | Swing | | |
| Labour hold | | Swing | | |
| Labour hold | | Swing | | |

==== Regent's Park ====
Regent's Park (3)
| Party | Candidate | Votes | % | ±% |
|---|---|---|---|---|
| Labour | Heather Johnson* | 1,675 | 51.9 | +10.3 |
| Labour | Nasim Ali* | 1,648 | 51.1 | +6.9 |
| Labour | Nadia Shah | 1,599 | 49.5 | +11.4 |
| Conservative | Shahin Ahmed | 595 | 18.4 | −4.1 |
| Conservative | Hamish Hunter | 551 | 17.1 | −4.3 |
| Green | Daniel Jones | 525 | 16.3 | +6.2 |
| Conservative | Ellie Vesey-Thompson | 516 | 16.0 | −5.1 |
| Green | Stephen Plowden | 457 | 14.2 | +5.2 |
| Green | Nicholas Seston | 409 | 12.7 | +5.7 |
| UKIP | Barry Read | 380 | 11.8 | N/A |
| Liberal Democrats | Sam Cannicott | 232 | 7.2 | −20.4 |
| Liberal Democrats | Anne Wright | 198 | 6.1 | −15.4 |
| Liberal Democrats | Daviyani Kothari | 133 | 4.1 | −16.2 |
| Turnout | | 8,930 | 36.0% | |
| Labour hold | | Swing | | |
| Labour hold | | Swing | | |
| Labour hold | | Swing | | |

=== St Pancras and Somers Town ===
St Pancras and Somers Town (3)
| Party | Candidate | Votes | % | ±% |
|---|---|---|---|---|
| Labour | Roger Robinson* | 2,511 | 66.6 | +13.7 |
| Labour | Peter Brayshaw* | 2,488 | 65.9 | +14.8 |
| Labour | Samata Khatoon* | 2,423 | 64.2 | +13.8 |
| Green | Matty Mitford | 562 | 14.9 | +5.0 |
| Green | James Widdowson | 526 | 13.9 | −0.3 |
| Green | Koonal Shah | 440 | 11.7 | +3.6 |
| Conservative | Rob Culligan | 368 | 9.8 | −4.1 |
| Conservative | Brian Rice | 351 | 9.3 | −4.2 |
| Conservative | Elliot Miller | 295 | 7.8 | −5.5 |
| Liberal Democrats | Abdul Tarofdar | 245 | 6.5 | −13.2 |
| Liberal Democrats | Nana Adjepong | 192 | 5.1 | −14.4 |
| Liberal Democrats | Nicole Sykes | 178 | 4.7 | −13.2 |
| Turnout | | 10,617 | 38.6 | |
| Labour hold | | Swing | | |
| Labour hold | | Swing | | |
| Labour hold | | Swing | | |

=== Swiss Cottage ===
Swiss Cottage (3)
| Party | Candidate | Votes | % | ±% |
|---|---|---|---|---|
| Conservative | Andrew Marshall* | 1,340 | 43.0 | +4.1 |
| Conservative | Roger Freeman* | 1,294 | 41.5 | +2.4 |
| Conservative | Don Williams* | 1,221 | 39.2 | −0.3 |
| Labour | Ben Nunn | 1,029 | 33.0 | +6.0 |
| Labour | Simon Pearson | 1,008 | 32.4 | +10.7 |
| Labour | Gretel Reynolds | 960 | 30.8 | +10.2 |
| Green | Tom Franklin | 433 | 13.9 | +6.9 |
| Green | Helen Jack | 367 | 11.8 | +5.2 |
| Liberal Democrats | Jill Newbrook | 347 | 11.1 | −17.6 |
| Green | Sheila Patton | 339 | 10.9 | +6.0 |
| Liberal Democrats | Chris Butler | 300 | 9.6 | −16.0 |
| Liberal Democrats | Andrew Haslam-Jones | 230 | 7.4 | −17.8 |
| Turnout | | 8,886 | 34.7 | |
| Conservative hold | | Swing | | |
| Conservative hold | | Swing | | |
| Conservative hold | | Swing | | |

In 2018, Cllr Andrew Marshall resigned from the Conservative Party and defected to the Liberal Democrats.

=== West Hampstead ===
West Hampstead (3)
| Party | Candidate | Votes | % | ±% |
|---|---|---|---|---|
| Labour | Phil Rosenberg | 1,179 | 35.2 | +5.5 |
| Labour | Angela Pober | 1,166 | 34.8 | +11.0 |
| Labour | James Yarde | 1,082 | 32.3 | +9.1 |
| Liberal Democrats | Keith Moffitt* | 943 | 28.1 | −9.0 |
| Liberal Democrats | Gillian Risso-Gill* | 901 | 26.9 | −4.2 |
| Liberal Democrats | John Bryant* | 836 | 24.9 | −13.1 |
| Conservative | Nick Grierson | 811 | 24.2 | −3.8 |
| Conservative | Natalie Eliades | 800 | 23.9 | −2.7 |
| Conservative | Andrew Saywell | 715 | 21.3 | −2.2 |
| Green | Zane Hannan | 343 | 10.2 | +1.0 |
| Green | Richard Griffiths | 327 | 9.7 | +2.0 |
| Green | Quentin Tyler | 250 | 7.5 | +1.0 |
| UKIP | Magnus Nielsen | 202 | 6.0 | N/A |
| TUSC | David Pearce | 67 | 2.0 | N/A |
| Turnout | | 9,622 | 38.0 | |
| Labour gain from Liberal Democrats | | Swing | | |
| Labour gain from Liberal Democrats | | Swing | | |
| Labour gain from Liberal Democrats | | Swing | | |
