= 2010 Camden London Borough Council election =

2010 Camden Council election
- 6 May 2010

All 54 seats to Camden London Borough Council 27 seats needed for a majority
	First party	Second party
Leader	Nasim Ali	Keith Moffitt
Party	Labour	Liberal Democrats
Leader since	2009	2005
Leader's seat	Regent's Park	West Hampstead
Last election	18 seats, 29.0%	20 seats, 27.8%
Seats won	30	13
Seat change	▲12	▼7
Popular vote	32,356	28,525
Percentage	33.5%	29.5%
Swing	▲4.5%	▲1.7%
	Third party	Fourth party
Leader	Andrew Marshall	Alex Goodman
Party	Conservative	Green
Leader since	2006	2009
Leader's seat	Swiss Cottage	Highgate (did not re-stand)
Last election	14 seats, 26.0%	2 seats, 14.8%
Seats won	10	1
Seat change	▼4	▼1
Popular vote	23,607	11,142
Percentage	24.4%	11.5%
Swing	▼1.6%	▼3.3%
- map of the results of the 2010 Camden council election. Labour in red, Liberal Democrats in yellow, Conservatives in blue and Green Party in green.
Leader before election
Keith Moffitt
Liberal Democrats
Leader
Nasim Ali
Labour

The 2010 Camden Council election took place on 6 May 2010 to elect members of Camden London Borough Council in London, England. The whole council was up for election and the Labour Party gained overall control of the council from no overall control.

== Election result ==
The results saw Labour gain a majority on the council ousting the Liberal Democrat and Conservative alliance that had controlled the council. Labour won 30 seats, while the Liberal Democrats were reduced to 13 seats, and the Conservatives were reduced to 10 seats. The Green Party also lost seats, being reduced to 1 seat in Highgate, after losing the other 2 seats in the ward to Labour.

Labour gained seats from the Liberal Democrats in Camden Town with Primrose Hill, Cantelowes, Kentish Town and Kilburn, while the Conservatives lost seats in Bloomsbury and Gospel Oak to Labour. However, the Conservatives did make gains in Belsize. Following the election Andrew Marshall resigned as leader of the Conservative group and was succeeded by Martin Davies.

The election in Haverstock was delayed after the death of Liberal Democrat councillor Syed Hoque during the campaign. The delayed election in Haverstock was held on 25 May 2010 and saw the Liberal Democrats hold all 3 seats in the ward. This brought the composition of the council to 30 Labour, 13 Liberal Democrats, 10 Conservatives and 1 Green Party.

Camden local election result 2010
Party	Seats	Gains	Losses	Net gain/loss	Seats %	Votes %	Votes	+/−
Labour	30			+12	58.8	33.5	32,356	+4.5
Liberal Democrats	13			-7	19.6	29.5	28,525	+1.7
Conservative	10			-4	19.6	24.4	23,607	-1.6
Green	1			-1	2.0	11.5	11,142	-3.3
BNP	0			0	0.0	0.5	450	N/A
UKIP	0			0	0.0	0.3	286	+0.2
Independent	0			0	0.0	0.2	230	-0.6
Socialist (GB)	0			0	0.0	0.1	113	N/A

== Ward results ==
Existing Councillor seeking re-election denoted by asterisk (*).

=== Belsize ===
Belsize (3)
Party	Candidate	Votes	%	±%
Conservative	Jonny Bucknell	1,969	36.1	−1.0
Conservative	Claire-Louise Leyland	1,969	36.1	−0.1
Liberal Democrats	Tom Simon *	1,949	35.7	−5.1
Conservative	Nigel Rumble	1,897	34.8	−0.9
Liberal Democrats	Anne Ward	1,746	32.0	−8.5
Liberal Democrats	Paul Perkins	1,727	31.7	−6.4
Labour	Samantha Gunasekera	1,094	20.1	+6.2
Labour	Sada Deshmukh	1,051	19.3	+5.1
Labour	Luca Salice	1,027	18.8	+6.5
Green	Anya Courts	410	7.5	−0.3
Green	Sophie North	372	6.8	−1.6
Green	Francesca Richards-Spiller	325	6.0	−0.2
BNP	Derek Collins	90	1.7	N/A
Turnout		5,454	62.3	+24.0
Conservative gain from Liberal Democrats		Swing		
Conservative gain from Liberal Democrats		Swing		
Liberal Democrats hold		Swing		

=== Bloomsbury ===
Bloomsbury (3)
Party	Candidate	Votes	%	±%
Labour	Adam Harrison	1,670	40.1	+0.5
Labour	Milena Nuti	1,554	37.3	+0.7
Labour	Abdul Quadir	1,315	31.5	−3.9
Conservative	Rebecca Hossack *	1,221	29.3	−6.1
Conservative	Timothy Barnes	1,142	27.4	−5.6
Liberal Democrats	Elizabeth Jones	1,061	25.4	+11.8
Liberal Democrats	Aimery de Malet	954	22.9	+10.2
Conservative	Gotz Mohindra	923	22.1	−2.9
Liberal Democrats	Abdul Tarofdar	645	15.5	+4.4
Green	Beatrix Campbell	602	14.4	+0.5
Green	Justin Hoffman	414	9.9	−3.1
Green	Samuel De Mesquita	413	9.9	−1.3
Turnout		4,169	53.8	+16.2
Labour hold		Swing		
Labour hold		Swing		
Labour gain from Conservative		Swing		

=== Camden Town with Primrose Hill ===
Camden Town with Primrose Hill (3)
Party	Candidate	Votes	%	±%
Labour	Pat Callaghan *	2,482	43.1	+5.0
Liberal Democrats	Chris Naylor *	1,835	31.9	−6.5
Labour	Thomas Neumark	1,753	30.5	−2.8
Labour	Rob Higson	1,742	30.3	−2.1
Liberal Democrats	Nazia Gofur	1,702	29.6	−8.5
Liberal Democrats	Chris Richards	1,511	26.3	−10.0
Conservative	Michael Corby	1,290	22.4	+7.6
Conservative	Peter Home	1,170	20.3	+6.2
Conservative	Christos Kassapis	1,059	18.4	+4.4
Green	Russell Oppenheimer	595	10.3	−1.3
Green	Pamela Walker	583	10.1	+1.3
Green	Vincent Thurgood	569	9.9	−0.1
Independent	Paul Grosvenor	140	2.4	N/A
Turnout		5,756	63.3	+21.2
Labour hold		Swing		
Liberal Democrats hold		Swing		
Labour gain from Liberal Democrats		Swing		

=== Cantelowes ===
Cantelowes (3)
Party	Candidate	Votes	%	±%
Labour	Angela Mason	2,109	40.1	+8.3
Labour	Phil Jones	2,049	39.0	+8.3
Liberal Democrats	Paul Braithwaite *	1,972	37.5	−3.5
Labour	Warwick Sharp	1,734	33.0	+2.6
Liberal Democrats	Sarah Hoyle	1,681	32.0	−6.8
Liberal Democrats	Rocky Lorusso	1,507	28.7	−9.2
Green	Sheila Hayman	752	14.3	−2.8
Conservative	Rohit Grover	712	13.5	+0.7
Conservative	Iain Martin	699	13.3	+1.8
Conservative	Carole Ricketts	631	12.0	+1.5
Green	Colin Houston	469	8.9	−6.2
Green	Rachel Zatz	326	6.2	−6.9
UKIP	Max Spencer	147	2.8	N/A
Turnout		5,257	60.8	+25.5
Labour gain from Liberal Democrats		Swing		
Labour gain from Liberal Democrats		Swing		
Liberal Democrats hold		Swing		

=== Fortune Green ===
Fortune Green (3)
Party	Candidate	Votes	%	±%
Liberal Democrats	Flick Rea *	2,123	40.6	−12.1
Liberal Democrats	Russell Eagling *	1,898	36.3	−4.9
Liberal Democrats	Nancy Jirira *	1,788	34.2	−9.0
Conservative	Harvard Hughes	1,342	25.7	+1.4
Conservative	Gio Spinella	1,335	25.6	+3.5
Conservative	Phil Woodward	1,326	25.4	+4.4
Labour	Phil Turner	1,207	23.1	+2.0
Labour	Enyd Norman	1,190	22.8	+2.9
Labour	Charlie Hedges	1,177	22.5	+7.9
Green	Paul Greenhalgh	595	11.4	−1.5
Green	Jane Ennis	536	10.3	−0.8
Green	Hugo Plowden	287	5.5	−5.1
Turnout		5,224	63.0	+28.4
Liberal Democrats hold		Swing		
Liberal Democrats hold		Swing		
Liberal Democrats hold		Swing		

=== Frognal and Fitzjohns ===
Frognal and Fitzjohns (3)
Party	Candidate	Votes	%	±%
Conservative	Martin Davies *	2,624	53.0	−8.0
Conservative	Laura Trott	2,490	50.3	−7.3
Conservative	Andrew Mennear *	2,382	48.1	−9.0
Liberal Democrats	Jeffrey Fine	1,151	23.2	+5.9
Liberal Democrats	Richard Bauer	1,046	21.1	+6.1
Labour	Phil Hingley	910	18.4	+4.5
Labour	Paul Blanchard	870	17.6	+4.2
Liberal Democrats	Andrew Haslam-Jones	864	17.4	+4.4
Labour	Shahnewaz Ahmed	724	14.6	+2.6
Green	Charles Harris	359	7.2	−5.4
Green	Alice Taylor	346	7.0	−3.2
Green	Edward Ross	342	6.9	−4.4
Turnout		4,954	58.2	+26.0
Conservative hold		Swing		
Conservative hold		Swing		
Conservative hold		Swing		

=== Gospel Oak ===
Gospel Oak (3)
Party	Candidate	Votes	%	±%
Labour	Sean Birch	2,015	39.6	+4.6
Labour	Theo Blackwell	1,965	38.6	+3.7
Labour	Larraine Revah	1,825	35.9	+3.0
Conservative	Lulu Mitchell *	1,421	27.9	−11.5
Conservative	Keith Sedgwick *	1,344	26.4	−10.7
Conservative	Steve Adams	1,305	25.6	−12.5
Liberal Democrats	Margaret Jackson-Roberts	1,107	21.8	+7.0
Liberal Democrats	Laura Noel	1,006	19.8	+6.6
Liberal Democrats	Simon Horvat-Marcovic	860	16.9	+6.2
Green	Robin Smith	602	11.8	−0.4
Green	Jane Walby	595	11.7	−0.1
Green	Constantin Buhayer	548	10.8	+1.2
Turnout		5,089	63.0	+17.1
Labour gain from Conservative		Swing		
Labour gain from Conservative		Swing		
Labour gain from Conservative		Swing		

=== Hampstead Town ===
Hampstead Town (3)
Party	Candidate	Votes	%	±%
Conservative	Chris Knight *	2,261	40.9	−3.4
Liberal Democrats	Linda Chung *	2,198	39.7	+6.5
Conservative	Kirsty Roberts *	2,159	39.0	−6.3
Conservative	Stephen Stark	2,006	36.3	−14.5
Liberal Democrats	David Bouchier	1,775	32.1	−3.6
Liberal Democrats	Ian Harrison	1,681	30.4	+3.4
Labour	Janet Guthrie	1,113	20.1	+7.8
Labour	Tom Tabori	757	13.7	+2.2
Labour	Suhel Islam	728	13.2	+2.6
Green	Stuart Houghton	528	9.5	+0.4
Green	Ian Patton	349	6.3	−1.6
Green	Prashant Vaze	303	5.5	−0.4
Turnout		5,533	69.4	+20.2
Conservative hold		Swing		
Liberal Democrats gain from Conservative		Swing		
Conservative hold		Swing		

=== Haverstock ===
Haverstock (3)
Party	Candidate	Votes	%	±%
Liberal Democrats	Jill Fraser *	1,462	47.0	+1.0
Liberal Democrats	Matt Sanders *	1,326	42.6	+7.3
Liberal Democrats	Rahel Mohammed Bokth	1,291	41.5	+7.1
Labour	Sabrina Francis	1,257	40.4	+4.1
Labour	Tom Copley	1,202	38.6	+2.7
Labour	Joynal Uddin	1,114	35.8	+2.2
Conservative	Joan Stally	259	8.3	−3.5
Conservative	Tom Frost	250	8.0	−3.0
Green	Jane Lawrie	246	7.9	−3.5
Green	Paul Grader	240	7.7	−3.6
Conservative	Robert Ricketts	236	7.6	−3.3
Green	Sean Thompson	181	5.8	−2.1
Turnout		3,112	36.23%	
Liberal Democrats hold		Swing		
Liberal Democrats gain from Labour		Swing		
Liberal Democrats gain from Labour		Swing		

=== Highgate ===
Highgate (3)
Party	Candidate	Votes	%	±%
Green	Maya De Souza *	1,889	33.0	−2.3
Labour	Valerie Leach	1,800	31.4	+4.5
Labour	Michael Nicolaides	1,661	29.0	+4.6
Labour	Michael Way	1,625	28.4	+5.3
Green	Naomi Aptowitzer	1,467	25.6	−6.4
Green	Tristan Smith	1,307	22.8	−7.9
Liberal Democrats	Ed Clayton	1,255	21.9	+11.2
Conservative	Anthony Denyer	1,254	21.9	−10.4
Conservative	Beth Charlesworth	1,239	21.6	−8.3
Conservative	Stephen Daughton	1,223	21.3	−8.3
Liberal Democrats	Kirsten De Keyser	1,047	18.3	+8.9
Liberal Democrats	David Simmons	947	16.5	+7.9
Turnout		5,730	69.9	+22.4
Green hold		Swing		
Labour gain from Conservative		Swing		
Labour gain from Green		Swing		

=== Holborn and Covent Garden ===
Holborn and Covent Garden (3)
Party	Candidate	Votes	%	±%
Labour	Julian Fulbrook *	2,279	46.6	+6.7
Labour	Sue Vincent *	1,947	39.8	−0.3
Labour	Awale Olad	1,784	36.5	±0.0
Conservative	Alison Frost	1,277	26.1	−3.8
Conservative	Richard Hopkin	1,168	23.9	−4.1
Conservative	Abdus Samad	1,147	23.5	−3.5
Liberal Democrats	Patrick Joy	1,057	21.6	+3.5
Liberal Democrats	Christopher Waiting	809	16.5	+1.1
Liberal Democrats	Phil Wainewright	799	16.3	+3.5
Green	Suzanne Hartley	617	12.6	−4.0
Green	Robert McCracken	472	9.7	−3.8
Green	Benedict Protheroe	399	8.2	−3.6
BNP	Robert Carlyle	180	3.7	N/A
Turnout		4,889	58.2	+26.5
Labour hold		Swing		
Labour hold		Swing		
Labour hold		Swing		

=== Kentish Town ===
Kentish Town (3)
Party	Candidate	Votes	%	±%
Labour	Georgia Gould	2,382	38.6	+5.4
Labour	Dave Horan	2,273	36.8	+7.1
Labour	Meric Apak	2,153	34.9	+6.4
Liberal Democrats	Ralph Scott *	2,052	33.2	+0.4
Liberal Democrats	Nick Russell *	1,957	31.7	−7.2
Liberal Democrats	Abdiwali Mohamud	1,755	28.4	−6.3
Green	Victoria Green	1,198	19.4	−9.5
Green	John Bird	939	15.2	−5.9
Conservative	Doreen Bartlett	812	13.2	+4.8
Conservative	Paul Barton	750	12.2	+3.8
Conservative	Darryl Davies	749	12.1	+4.7
Green	Alaa Owaineh	690	11.2	−9.6
BNP	Stephen Dorman	180	2.9	N/A
Socialist (GB)	Bill Martin	113	1.8	N/A
Turnout		6,172	64.1	+22.3
Labour gain from Liberal Democrats		Swing		
Labour hold		Swing		
Labour gain from Liberal Democrats		Swing		

=== Kilburn ===
Kilburn (3)
Party	Candidate	Votes	%	±%
Labour	Thomas Gardiner	2,047	40.5	+4.2
Labour	Mike Katz	1,819	36.0	−0.2
Labour	Maryam Eslamdoust	1,788	35.4	±0.0
Liberal Democrats	Janet Grauberg *	1,647	32.6	−6.4
Liberal Democrats	James King *	1,497	29.6	−8.9
Liberal Democrats	Mukul Hira	1,431	28.3	−12.1
Conservative	Will Davis	1,059	20.9	+6.8
Conservative	Patricia Cook	1,011	20.0	+6.3
Conservative	Sabah Hussain	808	16.0	+3.9
Green	Helen Mayer	391	7.7	−0.4
Green	Charlotte Whelan	364	7.2	−0.5
Green	Lauren Paris	327	6.5	−0.3
Independent	Francis Bacon	90	1.8	N/A
Turnout		5,055	59.2	+24.5
Labour gain from Liberal Democrats		Swing		
Labour gain from Liberal Democrats		Swing		
Labour gain from Liberal Democrats		Swing		

=== King's Cross ===
King's Cross (3)
Party	Candidate	Votes	%	±%
Labour	Sarah Hayward	1,844	41.3	+4.7
Labour	Abdul Hai *	1,706	38.2	−3.2
Labour	Jonathan Simpson *	1,681	37.6	+0.6
Liberal Democrats	Lee Baker	1,546	34.6	+9.0
Liberal Democrats	Yuan Potts	1,386	31.0	+7.8
Liberal Democrats	Huw Prior	1,283	28.7	+4.5
Conservative	Kashem Abdul	771	17.3	−1.4
Conservative	Piers Lindsay-Fynn	742	16.6	−1.8
Conservative	Andrew Parkinson	703	15.7	−0.7
Green	Edward Milford	454	10.2	−4.3
Green	Una Sapietis	427	9.6	−4.3
Green	Rienzi Trento	337	7.5	−6.2
Turnout		4,465	53.4	+22.1
Labour hold		Swing		
Labour hold		Swing		
Labour hold		Swing		

=== Regent's Park ===
Regent's Park (3)
Party	Candidate	Votes	%	±%
Labour	Nasim Ali *	2,304	44.2	+1.8
Labour	Heather Johnson *	2,171	41.6	+4.2
Labour	Tulip Siddiq	1,984	38.1	−0.3
Liberal Democrats	Jubel Ahmed	1,439	27.6	+8.9
Conservative	Will Blair	1,173	22.5	−3.5
Liberal Democrats	Bob Austin	1,121	21.5	+8.0
Conservative	Alan Coleman-Harvey	1,117	21.4	−4.2
Conservative	Nessa Khanom	1,101	21.1	−4.2
Liberal Democrats	Trevor Harris	1,061	20.3	+9.8
Green	Myles Jackman	529	10.1	−9.5
Green	Stephen Plowden	471	9.0	−5.8
Green	Rowan Yapp	367	7.0	−6.8
Turnout		5,214	58.7	+21.9
Labour hold		Swing		
Labour hold		Swing		
Labour hold		Swing		

=== St Pancras and Somers Town ===
St Pancras and Somers Town (3)
Party	Candidate	Votes	%	±%
Labour	Roger Robinson *	2,744	52.9	+7.8
Labour	Peter Brayshaw	2,650	51.1	+10.4
Labour	Samata Khatoon	2,614	50.4	+11.3
Liberal Democrats	Abdus Shaheed	1,024	19.7	+5.7
Liberal Democrats	Dave Hoefling	1,011	19.5	+8.8
Liberal Democrats	Frederic Carver	927	17.9	+7.7
Green	Natalie Bennett	738	14.2	−2.5
Conservative	Adam Lester	721	13.9	−0.3
Conservative	Brian Rice	701	13.5	−0.3
Conservative	Patsy Prince	688	13.3	−0.3
Green	Matty Mitford	467	9.0	−2.9
Green	Cathryn Symons	422	8.1	+1.2
Turnout		5,190	57.2	+18.2
Labour hold		Swing		
Labour hold		Swing		
Labour hold		Swing		

=== Swiss Cottage ===
Swiss Cottage (3)
Party	Candidate	Votes	%	±%
Conservative	Don Williams *	2,179	39.5	−5.1
Conservative	Roger Freeman *	2,161	39.1	−6.5
Conservative	Andrew Marshall *	2,145	38.9	−7.4
Liberal Democrats	Nick Horton	1,586	28.7	+9.2
Labour	Katharine Bligh	1,488	27.0	+3.4
Liberal Democrats	Tony Koutsoumbos	1,411	25.6	+11.1
Liberal Democrats	Flo Cubbin	1,389	25.2	+10.9
Labour	Lewis Baston	1,196	21.7	−1.2
Labour	Kathryn Purcell	1,139	20.6	+1.9
Green	Stephen Cottle	384	7.0	−8.6
Green	Morgan Watkins	367	6.6	−6.1
Green	Alan Wheatley	273	4.9	−4.2
UKIP	Magnus Nielsen	139	2.5	+0.2
Turnout		5,520	60.3	+28.3
Conservative hold		Swing		
Conservative hold		Swing		
Conservative hold		Swing		

=== West Hampstead ===
West Hampstead (3)
Party	Candidate	Votes	%	±%
Liberal Democrats	John Bryant *	2,061	38.0	−3.7
Liberal Democrats	Keith Moffitt *	2,014	37.1	−9.2
Liberal Democrats	Gillian Risso-Gill	1,688	31.1	−6.8
Labour	Virginia Berridge	1,611	29.7	+3.5
Conservative	Paul Ratner	1,521	28.0	+6.8
Conservative	Paul Church	1,445	26.6	+8.0
Labour	Carol Thomas	1,292	23.8	+0.5
Conservative	Boris Telyatnikov	1,276	23.5	+5.9
Labour	Miles Seaman	1,258	23.2	+2.0
Green	Tobias Davidson	499	9.2	−2.8
Green	Roderick Graham	417	7.7	−4.0
Green	Stuart Taylor	355	6.5	−4.2
Turnout		5,436	61.8	+30.6
Liberal Democrats hold		Swing		
Liberal Democrats hold		Swing		
Liberal Democrats hold		Swing		
