= Bloomsbury (ward) =

Electoral ward in the London Borough of Camden

Coordinates: 51°31.3′N 0°7.6′W

- Electoral ward for the Camden London Borough Council
- Bloomsbury ward boundaries since 2022
- Borough: Camden
- County: Greater London
- Population: 13,363 (2021) (Note: 2021 Census data reported for 2022 ward boundaries)
- Electorate: 7,039 (2022)
- Major settlements: Bloomsbury, Fitzrovia
- Area: 1.181 square kilometres (0.456 sq mi) (2022)

Current electoral ward
- Created: 1965
- Number of members: 3
- Councillors: Adam Harrison; Sabrina Francis; Lilac Carr
- ONS code: 00AGGE (2002–2022)
- GSS code: E05000129 (2002–2022); E05013653 (2022–present)

Bloomsbury is a ward in the London Borough of Camden, in the United Kingdom. It covers much of the historic area of Bloomsbury, and also some of Covent Garden and Fitzrovia.

The ward has existed since the creation of the borough on 1 April 1965 and was first used in the 1964 elections, although its boundaries have evolved significantly over time. Since 1983, the ward has been in the Holborn and St Pancras constituency, having previously been in Holborn and St Pancras South. It elects three councillors to Camden council, currently held by two members of the Labour Party and one member of the Green Party, with an election every four years. In 2018, the ward had an electorate of 8,318. The Boundary Commission projects the electorate to rise to 8,541 by 2025.

== Geography ==
The Bloomsbury ward is one of Camden's most densely populated wards, while also comprising the highest proportion of commercial and institutional uses. Its northern boundary is defined by the major Euston Road.

The ward encompasses much of the historic area of Bloomsbury, including most of its well-preserved surviving Georgian development in the west. This area is dense in land use and population, with a large proportion of institutional and commercial uses reflecting its Central London location. The premises of University College London comprises a large part of this ward, along with its various student housing blocks, while the commercial centre of Tottenham Court Road runs down the centre from north to south.

All of Camden's portion of Fitzrovia also falls within the Bloomsbury ward, leading some to confuse this area with Bloomsbury itself. This area is less densely developed, largely retaining its original Georgian character, with a large proportion of residential uses. The mixed-use commercial and residential centres of Charlotte Street and Goodge Street also fall within this area.

== List of councillors ==
Term	Councillor	Party
1964–1971	Harold Gould	Conservative
1964–1968	William Ridd	Conservative
1964–1971	Sidney Jaque	Conservative
1968–1971	Colin Jaque	Conservative
1971–1974	Jennifer Horne	Labour
1971–1974	Richard Arthur	Labour
1971–1974	Florence Parnell	Labour
1974–1978	John Guy	Labour
1974–1978	William Evans	Labour
1974–1982	John Thane	Labour
1978–1982	Martin McNeill	Labour
1978–1982	David Harris	Conservative
1982–1986	William Trite	Conservative
1982–1986	Andrew Gordon-Saker	Conservative
1982–1986	Brian Rathbone	Conservative
1986–1990	Michael Kirk	Labour
1986–1990	Nicola Kutapan	Labour
1986–1990	William Budd	Labour
1990–1994	Peter Brayshaw	Labour
1990–1994	John Toomey	Labour
1990–1994	Sadashivrao Deshmukh	Labour
1994–1998	Deidre Krymer	Labour
1994–1995	Shelley Burke	Labour
1994–2002	Nirmal Roy	Labour
1995–2002	Pat Callaghan	Labour
1998–2000	Jake Turnbull	Labour
2000–2006	Peter Brayshaw	Labour
2002–2010	Penelope Abraham	Labour
2002–2010	Fazlul Chowdhury	Labour
2006–2010	Rebecca Hossack	Conservative
2010–present	Adam Harrison	Labour
2010–2014	Milena Nuti	Labour
2010–2014	Abdul Quadir	Labour
2014–2026	Rishi Madlani	Labour
2014–present	Sabrina Francis	Labour
2026–present	Lilac Carr	Green

== Camden council elections since 2022 ==
Bloomsbury ward boundaries since 2022

There was a revision of ward boundaries in Camden in 2022. In the northeast from King's Cross ward the area bounded by Euston Road, Judd Street, Tavistock Place and Upper Woburn Place was gained. The ward gained territory in the southeast from Holborn and Covent Garden around Bloomsbury Square.

=== 2026 election ===
The election took place on 7 May 2026.

2026 Camden London Borough Council election: Bloomsbury
Party	Candidate	Votes	%	±%
Labour	Sabrina Francis*	910	40.2	
Labour	Adam Harrison	886	39.1	
Green	Lilac Carr	846	37.4	
Labour	Rishi Madlani*	827	36.5	
Green	Matthew Parsfield	817	36.1	
Green	Volodymyr Lukyanov	763	33.7	
Conservative	William Frost	266	11.7	
Reform	Christopher Cooke	251	11.1	
Reform	Richard Samuel	241	10.6	
Conservative	Stuart Leach	236	10.4	
Liberal Democrats	Katie Cooke	198	8.7	
Liberal Democrats	Jonathan Lewin	198	8.7	
Conservative	Paul Bhangal	181	8.0	
Liberal Democrats	Kenneth Barnett	172	7.6	
Turnout			33.76	+3.56
Labour hold		Swing		
Labour hold		Swing		
Green gain from Labour		Swing		

=== 2022 election ===
The election took place on 5 May 2022.

2022 Camden London Borough Council election: Bloomsbury
Party	Candidate	Votes	%	±%
Labour	Sabrina Francis	1,411	66.4	
Labour	Adam Harrison	1,346	63.3	
Labour	Rishi Madlani	1,269	59.7	
Liberal Democrats	Catherine Hays	400	18.8	
Conservative	William Frost	378	17.8	
Conservative	Richard Hayward	351	16.5	
Conservative	Paul Bhangal	335	15.8	
Liberal Democrats	Jonathan Lewin	291	13.7	
Liberal Democrats	Farrell Monk	281	13.2	
Turnout		2,125	30.2	
Labour win (new boundaries)				
Labour win (new boundaries)				
Labour win (new boundaries)				

== 2002–2022 Camden council elections ==
Bloomsbury ward boundaries from 2002 to 2022

There was a revision of ward boundaries in Camden in 2002. The St Giles, Seven Dials and parts of Holborn/Covent Garden were removed from the ward in the south. The ward extended east of Woburn Place/Russell Square to take in a residential area including the Brunswick Centre.

=== 2018 election ===
The election took place on 3 May 2018.

2018 Camden London Borough Council election: Bloomsbury
Party	Candidate	Votes	%	±%
Labour	Adam Harrison	1,045	56.9	+6.7
Labour	Sabrina Francis	983	53.5	+4.2
Labour	Rishi Madlani	931	50.7	+3.2
Conservative	Paul Tavares	365	19.9	–3.7
Conservative	Shahin Ahmed	334	18.2	–2.6
Conservative	Abdul Malique	330	18.0	–1.0
Liberal Democrats	Jane Headland	254	13.8	+5.6
Liberal Democrats	Aimery de Malet Roquefort	242	13.2	+6.0
Green	Jane-Eve Straughton	226	12.3	–3.9
Liberal Democrats	Martin Wright	191	10.4	+3.9
Green	Robert McCracken	188	10.2	–5.2
Green	Juan Jimenez	183	10.0	–3.2
Turnout			31.7	
Labour hold		Swing		
Labour hold		Swing		
Labour hold		Swing		

=== 2014 election ===
The election took place on 22 May 2014.

2014 Camden London Borough Council election: Bloomsbury
Party	Candidate	Votes	%	±%
Labour	Adam Harrison	1,295	17.53	
Labour	Sabrina Francis	1,271	17.21	
Labour	Rishi Madlani	1,226	16.6	
Conservative	Timothy Barnes	608	8.23	
Conservative	Andrew Keep	536	7.26	
Conservative	Sarah Macken	489	6.62	
Green	Dee Searle	419	5.67	
Green	Samuel William Gage	396	5.36	
Green	Shana Tufail	341	4.61	
UKIP	Giles Game	219	2.95	
Liberal Democrats	Aimery de Malet Roquefort	212	2.87	
Liberal Democrats	Hammad Baig	185	2.51	
Liberal Democrats	Stanley Grossman	167	2.26	
Turnout		7,385	33.11	
Labour hold		Swing		
Labour hold		Swing		
Labour hold		Swing		

=== 2010 election ===
The election on 6 May 2010 took place on the same day as the United Kingdom general election.

2010 Camden London Borough Council election: Bloomsbury
Party	Candidate	Votes	%	±%
Labour	Adam Harrison	1670	14	
Labour	Milena Nuti	1554	13	
Labour	Abdul Quadir	1315	11	
Conservative	Rebecca Hossack	1221	10.2	
Conservative	Timothy Barnes	1142	9.6	
Liberal Democrats	Elizabeth Stanton Jones	1061	8.9	
Liberal Democrats	Aimery de Malet Roquefort	954	8	
Conservative	Gotz Mohindra	923	7.7	
Liberal Democrats	Abdul Tarofdar	645	5.4	
Green	Beatrix Campbell	602	5.1	
Green	Justin Romain Hoffman	414	3.5	
Green	Samuel Bueno De Mesquita	413	3.5	
Turnout			53.8%	
Labour hold		Swing		
Labour hold		Swing		
Labour gain from Conservative		Swing		

=== 2006 election ===
The election took place on 4 May 2006.

2006 Camden London Borough Council election: Bloomsbury
Party	Candidate	Votes	%	±%
Labour	Penelope Abraham	1,004	13.7	
Labour	Fazlul Chowdhury	928	12.6	
Conservative	Rebecca Hossack	898	12.2	
Labour	Peter Brayshaw	896	12.2	
Conservative	Robert Moritt	835	11.4	
Conservative	Janice Lavery	634	8.6	
Green	Linus Rees	353	4.8	
Liberal Democrats	Caroline Deys	344	4.7	
Green	Shahrar Ali	329	4.5	
Liberal Democrats	Steven Deller	323	4.4	
Green	George Graham	284	3.9	
Liberal Democrats	Philip Moser	282	3.8	
Independent	Andrew Halsey	53	0.7	
Turnout		7,348	37.6	
Labour hold		Swing		
Labour hold		Swing		
Conservative gain from Labour		Swing		

=== 2002 election ===
The election took place on 2 May 2002.

2002 Camden London Borough Council election: Bloomsbury
Party	Candidate	Votes	%	±%
Labour	Penelope Abraham	771	38.3	
Labour	Fazlul Chowdhury	756	37.5	
Labour	Peter Brayshaw	736	36.5	
Conservative	Adam Lester	642	31.9	
Conservative	Rohit Grover	636	31.6	
Conservative	Peter Horne	634	31.5	
Liberal Democrats	Adam Edwards	335	16.6	
Liberal Democrats	Philip Moser	295	14.6	
Liberal Democrats	John Ward	285	14.1	
Green	Lucy Thomas	262	13.0	
Green	Saly Zlotowitz	145	7.2	
Green	Marcus Petz	137	6.8	
Socialist Alliance	Janet Maiden	125	6.2	
Turnout		5,759		
Labour win (new boundaries)				
Labour win (new boundaries)				
Labour win (new boundaries)				

== 1978–2002 Camden council elections ==
Bloomsbury ward boundaries from 1978 to 2002

There was a revision of ward boundaries in Camden in 1978.

=== 2000 by-election ===
The by-election took place on 28 September 2000, following the resignation of Jake Turnbull.

2000 Bloomsbury by-election
Party	Candidate	Votes	%	±%
Labour	Peter Brayshaw	495	44.3	+1.0
Conservative	Patsy Prince	476	42.6	+16.8
Liberal Democrats	Edward Simmons	82	7.3	−12.0
Green	Kate Gordon	65	5.8	−5.8
Majority		19	1.7	
Turnout		1,118	14.5	
Labour hold		Swing		

=== 1998 election ===
The election took place on 7 May 1998.

1998 Camden London Borough Council election: Bloomsbury
Party	Candidate	Votes	%	±%
Labour	Pat Callaghan	1,050		
Labour	Nirmal Roy	908		
Labour	Jake Turnbull	777		
Conservative	Barbara Douglass	626		
Conservative	Mark Haley	538		
Conservative	Ian Nottingham	472		
Liberal Democrats	John Ward	468		
Liberal Democrats	Philip Moser	455		
Liberal Democrats	Gerald Wall	410		
Green	Nicki Kortvelyessy	280		
Turnout		5,984	27.4	
Labour hold		Swing		
Labour hold		Swing		
Labour hold		Swing		

=== 1995 by-election ===
The by-election took place on 4 May 1995, following the resignation of Shelley Burke.

1995 Bloomsbury by-election
Party	Candidate	Votes	%	±%
Labour	Pat Callaghan	1,271		
Conservative	William Whittaker	339		
Liberal Democrats	Gerrard Wall	258		
Turnout				
Labour hold		Swing		

=== 1994 election ===
The election took place on 5 May 1994.

1994 Camden London Borough Council election: Bloomsbury
Party	Candidate	Votes	%	±%
Labour	Deidre Krymer	1,281		
Labour Co-op	Shelley Burke	1,256		
Labour Co-op	Nirmal Roy	1,173		
Conservative	Mark Haley	611		
Conservative	William Whittaker	594		
Conservative	Piers Wauchope	556		
Liberal Democrats	Penelope Jones	499		
Liberal Democrats	Andrew Hoddinott	421		
Liberal Democrats	Timothy Pitt-Payne	421		
Camden Charter	Joan Savage	156		
Turnout			33.0%	
Labour hold		Swing		
Labour hold		Swing		
Labour hold		Swing		

=== 1990 election ===
The election took place on 3 May 1990.

1990 Camden London Borough Council election: Bloomsbury
Party	Candidate	Votes	%	±%
Labour	Peter Brayshaw	1,356	42.18	
Labour	John Toomey	1,210		
Labour	Sadashivrao Deshmukh	1,177		
Conservative	Mark Haley	751	24.84	
Conservative	Andrew Lownie	736		
Conservative	Robert Ricketts	719		
Green	Joanna Dickens	574	19.40	
Liberal Democrats	Mary Gillie	269	8.65	
Liberal Democrats	Patricia Smith	243		
Camden Charter	Brian Lake	163	4.93	
Camden Charter	Sital Maan	141		
Camden Charter	Robert Norman	133		
Registered electors		7,130		
Turnout		2668	37.42	
Rejected ballots		3	0.11	
Labour hold				
Labour hold				
Labour hold				

=== 1986 election ===
The election took place on 8 May 1986.

1986 Camden London Borough Council election: Bloomsbury
Party	Candidate	Votes	%	±%
Labour	Michael Kirk	1,307		
Labour	Nicola Kutapan	1,302		
Labour	William Budd	1,263		
Conservative	William Trite	1,158		
Conservative	Martine Moon	1,069		
Conservative	Mark Whitfield	1,033		
Alliance	James Morris	447		
Alliance	Geoffrey Sell	413		
Alliance	Felicity Watkin	387		
Turnout				
Labour gain from Conservative		Swing		
Labour gain from Conservative		Swing		
Labour gain from Conservative		Swing		

=== 1982 election ===
The election took place on 6 May 1982.

1982 Camden London Borough Council election: Bloomsbury
Party	Candidate	Votes	%	±%
Conservative	William Trite	1,086		
Conservative	Andrew Gordon-Saker	1,085		
Conservative	Brian Rathbone	1,062		
Labour	Martin McNeill	994		
Labour	Anne Robertson	969		
Labour	Michael Broughton	967		
Alliance	Peter Symonds	613		
Alliance	Geoffrey Sell	601		
Alliance	Dennis Strojwas	587		
Turnout				
Conservative gain from Labour		Swing		
Conservative gain from Labour		Swing		
Conservative hold		Swing		

=== 1978 election ===
The election took place on 4 May 1978.

1978 Camden London Borough Council election: Bloomsbury
Party	Candidate	Votes	%	±%
Labour	Martin McNeill	1,494		
Conservative	David Harris	1,399		
Labour	John Thane	1,385		
Labour	Glyn Thomas	1,373		
Conservative	Christopher Radmore	1,355		
Conservative	David Stone	1,310		
Turnout				
Labour win (new boundaries)				
Labour win (new boundaries)				
Labour win (new boundaries)				

== 1971–1978 Camden council elections ==
There was a revision of ward boundaries in Camden in 1971.

=== 1974 election ===
The election took place on 2 May 1974.

1974 Camden London Borough Council election: Bloomsbury
Party	Candidate	Votes	%	±%
Labour	John Guy	1,164	56.6	
Labour	William Evans	1,154		
Labour	John Thane	1,139		
Conservative	Mark Batchelor	892	43.4	
Conservative	Colin Jaque	853		
Conservative	Horace Shooter	839		
Turnout			27.8	
Labour hold		Swing		
Labour hold		Swing		
Labour hold		Swing		

=== 1971 election ===
The election took place on 13 May 1971.

1971 Camden London Borough Council election: Bloomsbury
Party	Candidate	Votes	%	±%
Labour	Jennifer Horne	1,383	55.6	
Labour	Richard Arthur	1,377		
Labour	Florence Parnell	1,345		
Conservative	Ian Galbraith	1,105	44.4	
Conservative	Colin Jaque	1,077		
Conservative	Horace Shooter	1,069		
Turnout			27.8	
Labour win (new boundaries)				
Labour win (new boundaries)				
Labour win (new boundaries)				

== 1964–1971 Camden council elections ==
External images
- Bloomsbury ward boundaries from 1965 to 1971 (west)
- Bloomsbury ward boundaries from 1965 to 1971 (east)

=== 1968 election ===
The election took place on 9 May 1968.

1968 Camden London Borough Council election: Bloomsbury
Party	Candidate	Votes	%	±%
Conservative	Harold Gould	1,440	73.3	
Conservative	Sidney Jaque	1,440		
Conservative	Colin Jaque	1,439		
Labour	David Carlton	530	26.7	
Labour	Keith Morrell	522		
Labour	Eileen O'Connor	522		
Turnout			29.6	
Conservative hold		Swing		
Conservative hold		Swing		
Conservative hold		Swing		

=== 1964 election ===
The election took place on 7 May 1964.

1964 Camden London Borough Council election: Bloomsbury
Party	Candidate	Votes	%	±%
Conservative	Harold Gould	1,390		
Conservative	William Ridd	1,386		
Conservative	Sidney Jaque	1,383		
Labour	Gyuri Wagner	1,118		
Labour	Frank Dobson	1,110		
Labour	Irene Wagner	1,097		
Turnout		2,544	32.2	
Conservative win (new seat)				
Conservative win (new seat)				
Conservative win (new seat)				
