= Murder of Richard Everitt =

1994 murder in England

- Richard Everitt, undated
- Location: 51.532192°N 0.128529°W; Somers Town, Camden, London, England
- Date: 13 August 1994; Between 21:00 and 22:00 BST
- Attack type: Stabbing
- Weapon: Kitchen knife
- Deaths: 1
- Victim: Richard Everitt
- Convicted: Badrul Miah (conspiracy to murder, life sentence with 12-year minimum); Showat Akbar (violent disorder, 3 years youth detention)
- Judge: Mrs Justice Steel

Richard Norman Everitt (6 December 1978 – 13 August 1994) was a white 15-year-old boy who was stabbed to death in London, England. Everitt lived in Somers Town, which had been the site of ethnic tensions. He was murdered by a gang of British Bangladeshis who were seeking revenge against another white boy. Everitt did not provoke the attack and had no history of anti-social behaviour.

Badrul Miah, Showat Akbar, and Abdul Hai were tried in 1995. Miah was given a life sentence, with a minimum term of 12 years. Akbar was sentenced to three years in custody for violent disorder. Hai was acquitted by the jury on the direction of the trial judge, at the close of the prosecution case.

== Background ==
Somers Town, in the London Borough of Camden, was experiencing urban decay in the early 1990s. Many of its white families had been moved from the social housing there onto newer estates, and those who remained lived in poverty and unemployment, and felt in conflict with Bengalis. Bengalis were living in the neighbourhood's worst housing, with problems of overcrowding due to their larger families.

White youths and Bengali youths attended different youth clubs, and interracial relationships were shunned. Hate crimes occurred in the area, with statistics showing that they were predominantly against Bengalis; white locals claimed that these statistics reflected phony or exaggerated reports filed by Bengalis to gain preferential access to housing. Bengalis said that their complaints were going unheard.

Everitt attended South Camden Community School, where there were ethnic tensions, although he was not involved in them. His mother had previously complained when he was allegedly threatened with a knife by an Asian pupil.

Rosemary Harris, an anthropologist from nearby University College London, researched Somers Town's ethnic unrest in the early 1990s. She documented gangs of white, black and Asian origin, and concluded that the unrest was not caused by external political extremists but rather by the playground rivalries of teenagers. She observed a discussion between Everitt's parents and a teacher after he was attacked by a Bangladeshi group, weeks before his murder occurred. Harris said that Camden Council were uninterested in the research when it emerged that the unrest was not solely due to white racism, and said that school staff were fearful of disciplining Bangladeshis.

A local Asian police officer said that the police were hesitant to see Somers Town's gang problem as race-related, and preferred to erroneously consider it motivated by rivalry between different estates.

== Victim ==
Richard Norman Everitt was born on 6 December 1978 in Camden to Norman and Mandy Everitt. His family were native to North London and moved to the Somers Town Estate in 1986. Everitt had two older siblings: Daniel and Lucy. His hobbies included building bikes, football, and playing on his Sega Megadrive. In court Everitt was described by a friend as "well-liked, very kind and someone who would do anything for anybody" and by the prosecution as "a mild-mannered and harmless 15-year-old boy who presented an easy target".

== Murder ==
On the night of 13 August 1994, Everitt returned from playing football and went to buy food with his friends. They returned with the food in a bag, walking along Midland Road next to St Pancras railway station and then turning onto Brill Place between 21:00 and 22:00.

A gang of Asian youths had set off from the Euston area towards Somers Town, seeking revenge on an Irish teenager named Liam Coyle over a grievance related to stolen property. The prosecution said that the gang represented "a danger to any vulnerable white youth whom they happened to encounter".

The gang first surrounded a 16-year-old boy named Mark Andrew on Goldington Street and demanded to know whether he knew Liam; when he replied that he did not, they punched him, pursued him and attempted to stab him in the back, with the victim suffering a small knife wound. One of the gang members was heard to shout "Oi, you cunt, you're going to die". The gang then moved south and then west along Brill Place.

On the night of his murder Everitt was with two other white boys, who were identified in court as PP 9 (aged 14) and MF (aged 17). The Asian gang had initially been walking away from the boys, but upon spotting them they turned around. One of the gang, who the prosecution contended was Miah, demanded to know whether MF knew Liam Coyle; when MF replied that he did not, he was headbutted and accused of lying. MF and PP then managed to run away and escape. Everitt was caught and stabbed in the back with a seven-inch kitchen knife in his shoulder blades, piercing his heart. His friends notified his parents, who came to him as he was carried into an ambulance. Everitt died at the hospital.

Shortly after the stabbing, Badrul Miah bragged that the gang had "stabbed up a white boy". He returned to Euston where he met two girls who later claimed he told them "We've just had a fight with some white boys in Somers Town. We've just stabbed one of them". Miah was eating pot noodles at the time, which the prosecution later contended had been bought by Everitt and taken from him when he was stabbed. When Miah was arrested, he still had Everitt's blood on his jeans and trainers.

== Legal proceedings ==
During the investigations, a local Asian businessman offered a reward of £10,000 for whoever would name the suspects. Eleven men were arrested and bailed shortly after Everitt was stabbed.

The trial began on 5 October 1995 at the Old Bailey. The prosecution's position was that it was unknown who had wielded the knife, and that it was not necessarily Miah who had stabbed Everitt, but that the stabbing was a joint enterprise that Miah had been part of. On 1 November, Miah was found guilty of conspiring to murder Everitt and was given a life sentence with a minimum of twelve years in prison, while Showat Akbar was found guilty of violent disorder and sentenced to three years' youth detention. The judge, Mrs Justice Steel, acknowledged that the identity of the killer was unknown but characterised Miah and Akbar as "ringleaders" of the attack. She noted that some of the gang members had fled to Bangladesh, and told Miah and Akbar that "You two alone stand to carry the can for what happened on that night."

The judge ruled that there was no case to answer against the third defendant, Abdul Hai.

A campaign for the release of two convicts began, which asserted that the jury and prosecution had acted out of racism. Advocacy groups including Liberty, Camden Legal Centre, Camden Racial Equality Council, and the Society of Black Lawyers supported the campaign. Street protesters held a banner saying "FREE THE KINGS X TWO".

Miah and Akbar appealed their convictions on several grounds. The defence sought to include as part of the appeal a note which they claimed was written by a female juror shortly after the original trial and later provided to Imran Khan, a solicitor on the defendants' legal team. The note claims that multiple members of the jury presumed the defendants' guilt before any evidence was presented, appeared to exhibit "underlying prejudice of some description" towards them, were convinced that Hai was guilty, and were further convinced that Miah had personally inflicted the fatal stab wound on Everitt (despite this never being alleged by the prosecution). According to the note, had the jury not been directed to acquit Hai, they would have found him guilty, despite there being - in the opinion of one dissenting juror - "absolutely no evidence to support this at all".

This appeal was rejected by the Court of Appeal in November 1996. The court noted in its judgement that it was not satisfied that the alleged juror's note was genuine, but that even if it were, extensive precedent establishes that evidence from jurors about deliberations that took place in the jury room is not admissible in court, and that to disclose or solicit disclosure of what was said in the jury room is a criminal offence under the Contempt of Court Act 1981. The court further noted that if the note were genuine, then both its author and Imran Khan had violated the 1981 Act.

Miah further appealed the case to European Court of Human Rights in July 1998, but this appeal was also unsuccessful. He was released in 2008.

== Aftermath ==
Everitt's murder was received with shock in Somers Town. A Bengali teenager told The Independent that "The boy seems to have had nothing to do with trouble. We are so shocked that Bengali boys could do this. It is the innocent increasingly who are suffering". The Deputy Headmaster of Everitt's school told the press that cohesion was generally good at the school. Jalal Uddin, a Bengali activist, spoke of his fears that revenge attacks could continue perpetually.

A halal butcher's was firebombed, and white gangs attacked Bengalis. Bengalis told family members to stay indoors, and the police increased their presence in order to combat the gangs. A white gang member said that he would not accept support from the British National Party because "the BNP comes down here, gets everyone whipped up and then when the trouble starts we get it and they run away".

After the convictions, Everitt's family were abused by Bengali neighbours, and moved to Essex before settling in northern England. His mother successfully campaigned for stronger sentences for knife crime. In correspondence with the author Michael Collins, she said that "I know it's a terrible thing to say, but I sometimes wish that Richard had been murdered by a white boy. Then we'd have had to deal with the murder but not the nightmare of everything else that followed".

Frank Dobson, the local Labour MP, denied a racial motive and said that suggestions of such would inflame the situation.

The murder was mentioned by India Today as attributable to a decline in values among British Asian youth, who were previously considered a model minority but were becoming increasingly involved with drugs and gangs.

In February 2012, politician Richard Barnbrook (then independent, formerly BNP) raised the issue of Everitt's murder and that of Terry Gregory (2003) in the London Assembly. He questioned why 23 police officers were still investigating the murder of Stephen Lawrence, who was black, yet none were assigned to finding the killers of the aforementioned white teenagers, suggesting there were "hate crime double standards". Mayor Boris Johnson said that both cases were solved and neither were racist. In a follow-up statement the following month, Barnbrook said that only one person had been convicted for Everitt's death and nobody for Gregory's; Johnson replied that both cases had gone to court and judgement was made on the evidence available.

Abdul Hai went on to join the Labour Party and be elected to Camden Council, and says it was his experience being charged with murder that left him determined to make the world a better place and motivated him to enter politics. Despite being acquitted, he has been repeatedly subjected to claims of being a murderer, and has at times taken legal action in response to claims against him.

== Memorials and legacy ==
Diana, Princess of Wales privately laid flowers at the site of Everitt's murder. His funeral took place on 14 October 1994 at St Mary the Virgin Roman Catholic Church.

In response to Everitt's murder, the KXL Camden United sports project and football team for 15–19 year-olds was founded by Nasim Ali, who said it was "using sport as a tool to create multi-racial unity".

Socialist Workers Party activist Alan Walter launched Camden Action Now alongside Everitt's parents, offering youth activities and aiming to unite the community.

A memorial plaque and bench paying tribute to Everitt were placed near the location of his murder. The inscription on the bench included the text "Death is nothing at all. I have only slipped away into the next room." In June 2020, the council-owned land containing Everitt's memorial plaque was sold to private developers. The council put them into storage without prior notification of the family, where they were "neglected and later damaged", according to an article in Camden New Journal. In August 2024, a replacement memorial to him was unveiled nearby in Purchese Street Open Space.

== See also ==
- Murder of Ross Parker – a similar 2001 case in Peterborough
- Murder of Kriss Donald – a similar 2004 case in Glasgow
