= Hampstead and Kilburn =

UK Parliament constituency (2010–2024)

Coordinates: 51.549°N 0.194°W

- Former borough constituency for the House of Commons
- Boundary of Hampstead and Kilburn in Greater London
- County: Greater London
- Electorate: 78,183 (2019)

2010–2024
- Seats: One
- Created from: Brent East, Brent South, Hampstead and Highgate
- Replaced by: Brent East, Hampstead and Highgate

Hampstead and Kilburn was a constituency created in 2010 and represented in the House of Commons by Tulip Siddiq of the Labour Party from 2015 until its abolition for the 2024 general election. Glenda Jackson was the MP from 2010 to 2015, having served for the predecessor seat of Hampstead and Highgate since 1992.

Under the 2023 review of Westminster constituencies, the majority of the constituency – excluding the Borough of Brent wards of Brondesbury Park, Kilburn and Queens Park – was incorporated into the re-established seat of Hampstead and Highgate.

== Constituency profile ==
The seat covered Hampstead and West Hampstead, which are known for their large houses and affluent population, and to the west, the more working-class areas of Kilburn and Queen's Park.

== History ==
The constituency was created for the 2010 general election in which it was won by Labour's Glenda Jackson with a majority of 42 votes, being the most marginal result in England (the smallest majority in the UK was in Fermanagh and South Tyrone, Northern Ireland). In 2010, Hampstead and Kilburn was the closest three-way marginal seat, as the third-placed candidate obtained 841 fewer votes than the winner, approximately 1% of the electorate. In January 2013, Jackson announced that she would not seek re-election, one of 37 of her party's MPs who did so in the 2015 general election.

The seat was won by Labour candidate Tulip Siddiq. The 2015 result made the seat the 10th narrowest result of the party's 232 seats (by majority percentage). Comparing the 2015 election to the 2010 election, the Liberal Democrat share of the vote fell by 25.6%, which compared to a national negative swing for the party of 15.2%.

In the 2016 referendum, in which the UK voted to leave the European Union, the constituency voted to remain by 76.6%.

In 2017, Labour significantly increased its majority to 26.6%, winning nearly 60% of votes cast.

== Boundaries ==
Map of boundaries 2010–2024

The constituency covered a north-western portion of the London Borough of Camden and an easternmost portion of London Borough of Brent and was composed of the following electoral wards:

- Camden: Belsize, Fortune Green, Frognal and Fitzjohns, Hampstead Town, Kilburn (Camden), Swiss Cottage, West Hampstead
- Brent: Brondesbury Park, Kilburn (Brent), Queens Park

=== 2007 boundary review ===
Due to the Boundary Commission's fifth periodic review of Westminster constituencies, (Note: Specifically using their preferred subregion of North London) the number of constituencies across Camden and Brent fell from five to four. The seat of Hampstead and Kilburn was a new creation for the 2010 general election resulting from these changes.

Former wards

Hampstead Town, Belsize, Swiss Cottage, Frognal and Fitzjohns, Fortune Green, West Hampstead, and Kilburn (Camden) were transferred from the former constituency of Hampstead and Highgate. Brondesbury Park, Kilburn (Brent) and part of Queens Park wards were transferred from the former constituency of Brent East. A small part of Queens Park ward was transferred from the former constituency of Brent South.

== Members of Parliament ==
| Election | Member | Party |
|---|---|---|
| 2010 | Glenda Jackson | Labour |
| 2015 | Tulip Siddiq | Labour |

== Election results ==
=== Elections in the 2010s ===
General election 2019: Hampstead and Kilburn
| Party | Candidate | Votes | % | ±% |
|---|---|---|---|---|
| Labour | Tulip Siddiq | 28,080 | 48.9 | ▼10.1 |
| Conservative | Johnny Luk | 13,892 | 24.2 | ▼8.2 |
| Liberal Democrats | Matt Sanders | 13,121 | 22.9 | ▲15.9 |
| Green | David Stansell | 1,608 | 2.8 | ▲1.5 |
| Brexit Party | James Pointon | 684 | 1.2 | New |
| Majority | | 14,188 | 24.7 | ▼1.9 |
| Turnout | | 57,385 | 69.6 | ▼0.8 |
| Registered electors | | 82,432 | | |
| Labour hold | | Swing | ▼1.0 | |

General election 2017: Hampstead and Kilburn
| Party | Candidate | Votes | % | ±% |
|---|---|---|---|---|
| Labour | Tulip Siddiq | 34,464 | 59.0 | ▲14.6 |
| Conservative | Claire-Louise Leyland | 18,904 | 32.4 | ▼9.9 |
| Liberal Democrats | Kirsty Allan | 4,100 | 7.0 | ▲1.4 |
| Green | John Mansook | 742 | 1.3 | ▼3.1 |
| Independent | Hugh Easterbrook | 136 | 0.2 | New |
| Independent | Rainbow George Weiss | 61 | 0.1 | New |
| Majority | | 15,560 | 26.6 | ▲24.5 |
| Turnout | | 58,407 | 70.4 | ▲3.1 |
| Registered electors | | 82,957 | | |
| Labour hold | | Swing | ▲12.3 | |

General election 2015: Hampstead and Kilburn
| Party | Candidate | Votes | % | ±% |
|---|---|---|---|---|
| Labour | Tulip Siddiq | 23,977 | 44.4 | +11.6 |
| Conservative | Simon Marcus | 22,839 | 42.3 | +9.6 |
| Liberal Democrats | Maajid Nawaz | 3,039 | 5.6 | −25.6 |
| Green | Rebecca Johnson | 2,387 | 4.4 | +3.0 |
| UKIP | Magnus Nielsen | 1,532 | 2.8 | +2.0 |
| Independent | The Eurovisionary Carroll (deceased)* | 113 | 0.2 | New |
| U Party | Robin Ellison | 77 | 0.1 | New |
| Majority | | 1,138 | 2.1 | +2.0 |
| Turnout | | 53,964 | 67.3 | +1.0 |
| Registered electors | | 80,195 | | |
| Labour hold | | Swing | +1.0 | |

* Independent candidate Ronnie Carroll died following the close of nominations for the 2015 general election. Under current rules, the election proceeded with his name on the ballot paper and would have been rerun had he won.

General election 2010: Hampstead and Kilburn
| Party | Candidate | Votes | % | ±% |
|---|---|---|---|---|
| Labour | Glenda Jackson * | 17,332 | 32.81 | |
| Conservative | Chris Philp | 17,290 | 32.73 | |
| Liberal Democrats | Ed Fordham | 16,491 | 31.2 | |
| Green | Beatrix Campbell | 759 | 1.4 | |
| UKIP | Magnus Nielsen | 408 | 0.8 | |
| BNP | Victoria Moore | 328 | 0.6 | |
| Tamsin Omond To The Commons | Tamsin Omond | 123 | 0.2 | |
| Independent | Gene Alcantara | 91 | 0.2 | |
| Majority | | 42 | 0.08 | |
| Turnout | | 52,822 | 66.3 | |
| Registered electors | | 80,373 | | |
| Labour win (new seat) | | | | |

* Served as MP for Hampstead and Highgate 1992–2010

== See also ==
- Parliamentary constituencies in London
- Opinion polling in United Kingdom constituencies (2010–2015)
