= Holborn and Covent Garden =

Electoral ward in the London borough of Camden

Coordinates: 51.519°N 0.118°W

- Electoral ward for the Camden London Borough Council
- Holborn and Covent Garden ward boundaries since 2022
- Borough: Camden
- County: Greater London
- Population: 10,361 (2021) (Note: 2021 Census data reported for 2022 ward boundaries)
- Electorate: 7,973 (2022)
- Major settlements: Covent Garden and Holborn (Note: The ward covers only some parts of these neighbourhoods.)
- Area: 1.160 square kilometres (0.448 sq mi)

Current electoral ward
- Created: 2002
- Number of members: 3
- Councillors: Hamza Chowdhury; Jim Monahan; James White
- ONS code: 00AGGP (2002–2022)
- GSS code: E05000138 (2002–2022); E05013662 (2022–present)

Holborn and Covent Garden is an electoral ward in the south of the London Borough of Camden, in the United Kingdom. The ward was first used in the 2002 elections. It returns three councillors to Camden London Borough Council. The ward covers some parts of Covent Garden and Holborn in Central London. The boundary of the ward was revised in 2022, which removed some streets north of New Oxford Street and transferred them to Bloomsbury. At the first six general borough elections the ward returned Labour Party candidates. The election in 2026 was won for the first time by three Green Party candidates.

== List of councillors ==
Term	Councillor	Party
2002–2026	Julian Fulbrook	Labour
2002–2026	Sue Vincent	Labour
2002–2010	Brian Woodrow	Labour
2010–2026	Awale Olad	Labour
2026–present	Hamza Chowdhury	Green
2026–present	Jim Monahan	Green
2026–present	James White	Green

== Summary ==
Councillors elected by party at each general borough election.

- Labour
- Green

== Camden council elections since 2022 ==
There was a revision of ward boundaries in Camden in 2022. The ward lost some streets north of New Oxford Street to the Bloomsbury ward.

=== 2026 election ===
The election took place on 7 May 2026.

2026 Camden London Borough Council election: Holborn and Covent Garden
Party	Candidate	Votes	%	±%
Green	Hamza Chowdhury	1,271	14.7	
Green	Jim Monahan	1,176	13.6	
Green	James White	1,144	13.2	
Labour	Julian Fulbrook	1,035	12.0	
Labour	Livia Paggi	848	9.8	
Labour	Richard Olszewski	749	8.7	
Reform	Michael Anthony Kane	309	3.6	
Reform	Jack Nott-Bower	302	3.5	
Reform	Atlan Ramadan Dervish	263	3.0	
Conservative	Alison Frost	248	2.9	
Conservative	Tim Frost	220	2.5	
National Housing Party Camden People First	Patrick McGinnis	217	2.5	
Conservative	Kevin Anthony Sedgwick	189	2.2	
Liberal Democrats	Charlotte Wattebot O'Brien	185	2.1	
Liberal Democrats	Stephen Paul Barabas	182	2.1	
National Housing Party Camden People First	Mark Furnell	166	1.9	
Liberal Democrats	Erich Wagner	132	1.5	
Turnout		8636	37.4	
Green gain from Labour		Swing		
Green gain from Labour		Swing		
Green gain from Labour		Swing		

=== 2022 election ===
The election took place on 5 May 2022.

2022 Camden London Borough Council election: Holborn and Covent Garden
Party	Candidate	Votes	%	±%
Labour	Julian Fulbrook	1,807	68.8	
Labour	Sue Vincent	1,779	67.7	
Labour	Awale Olad	1,686	64.2	
Conservative	Maurice Hirt	362	13.8	
Conservative	Adam Lester	354	13.5	
Conservative	Alison Frost	349	13.3	
Liberal Democrats	Charlotte O'Brien	299	11.4	
Liberal Democrats	Stephen Barabas	268	10.2	
Independent	Patrick McGinnis	214	8.1	
Liberal Democrats	Erich Wagner	213	8.1	
Turnout			32.9	
Labour win (new boundaries)				
Labour win (new boundaries)				
Labour win (new boundaries)				

== 2002–2022 Camden council elections ==
Holborn and Covent Garden ward boundaries from 2002 to 2022

=== 2018 election ===
The election took place on 3 May 2018.

2018 Camden London Borough Council election: Holborn and Covent Garden
Party	Candidate	Votes	%	±%
Labour	Julian Fulbrook	1 716	21.4	+1.0
Labour	Sue Vincent	1 705	21.3	+2.3
Labour	Awale Olad	1 604	20.0	+2.4
Conservative	Alison Frost	544	6.8	−0.3
Conservative	Andrew Keep	497	6.2	−0.8
Conservative	Richard Merrin	446	5.6	−0.8
Green	Luke Dowding	419	5.2	−0.1
Liberal Democrats	Andrew Naughtie	312	3.9	+1.4
Green	John Mason	291	3.6	−1.4
Liberal Democrats	Charlotte O'Brien	257	3.2	+1.0
Liberal Democrats	Eric Wagner	216	2.7	+0.7
Turnout		8 007	32.5	−3.0
Labour hold		Swing		
Labour hold		Swing		
Labour hold		Swing		

=== 2014 election ===
The election took place on 22 May 2014.

2014 Camden London Borough Council election: Holborn and Covent Garden
Party	Candidate	Votes	%	±%
Labour	Julian Fulbrook	1 844	20.5	+4.1
Labour	Sue Vincent	1 714	19.0	+5.0
Labour	Awale Olad	1 588	17.6	+4.8
Conservative	Alison Frost	635	7.0	−2.1
Conservative	Lewis Barber	601	6.7	−1,7
Conservative	Daniel Nesbitt	576	6.4	−1.8
Green	Niki Brain	480	5.3	+0.9
Green	Eve Mullen	458	5.1	+1.7
Green	Anthony Quinn	357	4.0	+1.1
Liberal Democrats	Jeremy Allen	222	2.5	−5.1
Liberal Democrats	David Simmons	196	2.2	−3.6
Liberal Democrats	Ken Wright	181	2.0	−3.7
Independent	Robert Carlyle	162	1.8	+0.5
Turnout		9,046	35.5	−22.7
Labour hold		Swing		
Labour hold		Swing		
Labour hold		Swing		

=== 2010 election ===
The election on 6 May 2010 took place on the same day as the United Kingdom general election.

2010 Camden London Borough Council election: Holborn and Covent Garden
Party	Candidate	Votes	%	±%
Labour	Julian Fulbrook	2 279	16.4	+2.6
Labour	Sue Vincent	1 947	14	+0.1
Labour	Awale Olad	1 784	12.8	+0.2
Conservative	Alison Frost	1 277	9.2	−1.2
Conservative	Richard Hopkin	1 168	8.4	−1.3
Conservative	Abdus Samad	1,147	8.2	−1.1
Liberal Democrats	Patrick Joy	1 057	7.6	+1.3
Liberal Democrats	Christopher Waiting	809	5.8	+0.5
Liberal Democrats	Phil Wainewright	799	5.7	+1.3
Green	Suzanne Hartley	617	4.4	−1.3
Green	Robert McCracken	472	3.4	−1.3
Green	Benedict Protheroe	399	2.9	−1.2
BNP	Robert Carlyle	180	1.3	DNR
Turnout		13,935	58.2	+26.5
Labour hold		Swing		
Labour hold		Swing		
Labour hold		Swing		

=== 2006 election ===
The election took place on 4 May 2006.

2006 Camden London Borough Council election: Holborn and Covent Garden
Party	Candidate	Votes	%	±%
Labour	Susan Vincent	1 085	13.8	−2.4
Labour	Julian Fulbrook	1 079	13.8	−3,2
Labour	Brian Woodrow	988	12.6	−3.2
Conservative	Alison Frost	810	10.3	+2.3
Conservative	Timothy Barnes	758	9.7	+2.3
Conservative	Philip Nelson	731	9.3	+2.4
Liberal Democrats	Elizabeth Hanna	489	6.2	+0.3
Green	Benedict Protheroe	449	5.7	+1.2
Liberal Democrats	Stanley Grossman	417	5.3	−0.1
Green	Grace Hodgkinson-Barrett	364	4.6	+0.1
Liberal Democrats	Simieon Litman	347	4.4	−0.1
Green	Stuart Houghton	319	4.1	+0.4
Majority		178	2.3	−59.0
Turnout		7 836		
Labour hold		Swing		
Labour hold		Swing		
Labour hold		Swing		

=== 2002 election ===
The election took place on 2 May 2002.

2002 Camden London Borough Council election: Holborn and Covent Garden
Party	Candidate	Votes	%	±%
Labour	Julian Fulbrook	950	17.0	
Labour	Sue Vincent	908	16.2	
Labour	Brian Woodrow	884	15.8	
Conservative	Patsy Prince	449	8.0	
Conservative	Dominic Valder	411	7.4	
Conservative	Robert Ricketts	389	7.0	
Liberal Democrats	Eleanor Key	331	5.9	
Liberal Democrats	Alastir Loraine	305	5.5	
Green	Nicholas Duckett	255	4.6	
Green	Seanine Joyce	253	4.5	
Liberal Democrats	Herbert Newbrook	251	4.5	
Green	Hugo Charlton	205	3.7	
Turnout		5 591		
Labour win (new seat)				
Labour win (new seat)				
Labour win (new seat)				
