= Nadia Shah =

British Labour politician

Cllr Nadia Shah
- নদিয়া শাহ

Mayor of Camden
- In office 11 May 2016 – 17 May 2017
- Deputy: Richard Cotton
- Preceded by: Larraine Revah
- Succeeded by: Richard Cotton

Deputy Mayor of Camden
- In office May 2015 – 11 May 2016
- Preceded by: Larraine Revah
- Succeeded by: Richard Cotton

Camden London Borough Councillor for Regent's Park
- In office 22 May 2014 – 7 May 2026
- Preceded by: Tulip Siddiq

Personal details
- Born: September 1979 (age 46) Camden, London, England
- Party: Labour
- Spouse: J. Shah
- Children: 3
- Parent: Muhammad Nazrul Islam (father)
- Profession: Politician

Nadia Shah (Bengali: নদিয়া শাহ) is a British Labour Party politician, former councillor for Regent's Park and former Mayor of Camden. In May 2016, she became the first female mayor of British Bangladeshi heritage. She was elected onto Camden councils cabinet after stepping down as Mayor. She became a cabinet member and held the portfolio of Skills, Employment & Youth and is currently serving as the cabinet member for 'Safer Communities'with special responsibility for rough sleeping and creating vibrant markets.

She lost her seat in 2026.

== Early life ==
Shah was born and brought up in Camden, London, England where has lived with her parents and three sisters. She attended school in Camden and graduated from the University of Greenwich.

Shah's ancestral home is at Kulaura Upazila, Moulvibazar District, Bangladesh.

== Career ==
Shah worked in Camden for all of her working life. She started her career as an investments adviser at NatWest Bank of England. She also worked at Home Office and several departments of the local and central government of Britain. Shah has been employed as a social worker and a youth worker. As a teenager she volunteered with young people in the borough, and she has managed community projects helping people with drug addiction and a community centre as a project manager. She became a coopted trustee for the Surma centre (the largest organisation working for the Bangladeshi community) and then went on to become an elected director.

She is a trustee of the Business Improvement District and a governor in schools, a lifelong member of the London Mayors Association, and a trustee of the West Euston Partnership.

In May 2014, in the Camden London Borough Council election, Shah was elected as a councillor for the Regent's Park ward, where Tulip Siddiq was a councillor before becoming MP in 2015. In 2014, she was elected by members and served on the executive committee of the council.

In May 2016, Shah was appointed Mayor of Camden at Camden Town Hall in a ceremony which also saw confirmation of the council's new cabinet. She became the first Bangladeshi-origin female mayor in any city in the UK. Shah chose the Anna Freud Centre in Hampstead as her official charity for the forthcoming year.

Shah currently works in the family business and is also self-employed.

== Awards ==
In 2014, Shah received the Camden Community Award in recognition for the work and dedication for the work done with the community. In November 2016, she picked up the inaugural Lord's Taverners Community Partnership Award on behalf of Camden Council.

== See also ==
- British Bangladeshi
- List of British Bangladeshis
- List of ethnic minority politicians in the United Kingdom

Civic offices
Preceded by Larraine Revah	Mayor of Camden; 11 May 2016 – 17 May 2017	Succeeded by Richard Cotton
