= King's Cross (ward) =

Electoral ward in the London borough of Camden

Coordinates: 51.527°N 0.122°W

- Electoral ward for the Camden London Borough Council
- King's Cross ward boundaries since 2022
- Borough: Camden
- County: Greater London
- Population: 11,462 (2021) (Note: 2021 Census data reported for 2022 ward boundaries)
- Electorate: 7,030 (2022)
- Area: 1.065 square kilometres (0.411 sq mi)

Current electoral ward
- Created: 1965
- Number of members: 1964–1971: 3; 1971–1978: 4; 1978–2002: 2; 2002–present: 3
- Councillors: Jonathan Simpson; Lotis Bautista; Liam Martin-Lane
- ONS code: 00AGGS (2002–2022)
- GSS code: E05000141 (2002–2022); E05013666 (2022–present)

King's Cross is an electoral ward in the London Borough of Camden, in the United Kingdom. The ward has existed since the creation of the borough on 1 April 1965 and was first used in the 1964 elections. It returns councillors to Camden London Borough Council. The ward was subject to boundary revisions in 1971, 1978 and 2002 which also adjusted the number of councillors returned. The most recent change in 2022 significantly altered the boundaries of the ward. The ward has been dominated by councillors standing as Labour Party candidates throughout its existence.

== List of councillors ==
Term	Councillor	Party
1964–1968	Clifford Tucker	Labour
1964–1968	John Diamond	Labour
1964–1968	Arthur Graves	Labour
1968–1971	John Glendinning	Conservative
1968–1971	Ian Clarke	Conservative
1968–1971	Thomas Morris	Conservative
1971–1978	Lyndal Evans	Labour
1971–1974	Joseph Jacob	Labour
1971–1974	Michael Cendrowicz	Labour
1971–1978	David Offenbach	Labour
1974–1978	David Windsor	Labour
1974–1978	Margaret Robertson	Labour
1978–1982	Anthony Craig	Labour
1978–1981	Roderick Cordara	Labour
1981–1990	Barbara Hughes	Labour
1998–2006	Barbara Hughes	Labour
1982–1990	Anthony Dykes	Labour
1990–1994	Gloria Lazenby	Labour
1990–1998	John White	Labour
1994–1998	Angus Walker	Labour
1998–2006	Nick Smith	Labour
2002–2010	Geethika Jayatilaka	Labour
2006–2022	Abdul Hai	Labour
2006–present	Jonathan Simpson	Labour
2010–2018	Sarah Hayward	Labour
2018–2022	Georgie Robertson	Labour
2022–present	Lotis Bautista	Labour
2022–present	Liam Martin-Lane	Labour

== Camden council elections since 2022 ==
There was a revision of ward boundaries in Camden in 2022.

=== 2026 election ===
The election took place on 7 May 2026.

King's Cross (3 seats)
Party	Candidate	Votes	%	±%
Labour	Lotis Bautista*	1,048	45.3	
Labour	Jonathan Simpson	995	43.0	
Labour	Liam Martin-Lane*	979	42.3	
CPA	Joel Anderson	778	33.6	
CPA	Shezan Renny	694	30.0	
CPA	Paul Renny	687	29.7	
Liberal Democrats	Joan Baktis	236	10.2	
Reform	Andre Cowell-Berry	224	9.7	
Conservative	Cat Frost	224	9.7	
Liberal Democrats	Elizabeth Pearson	218	9.4	
Reform	Anthony Hegarty	212	9.2	
Liberal Democrats	Derek McAuley	204	8.8	
Conservative	Robyn Gardner	194	8.4	
Conservative	Tom Hatton	186	8.0	
NHPUK	Luke McCarthy	60	2.59	
Turnout				
Labour hold		Swing		
Labour hold		Swing		
Labour hold		Swing		

=== 2022 election ===
The election took place on 5 May 2022.

2022 Camden London Borough Council election: King's Cross
Party	Candidate	Votes	%	±%
Labour	Lotis Bautista	1,317	68.4	
Labour	Liam Martin-Lane	1,256	65.2	
Labour	Jonathan Simpson	1,205	62.6	
Green	Alex Smith	417	21.7	
Conservative	Catherine Frost	249	12.9	
Conservative	Douglas de Morais	219	11.4	
Conservative	Clementine Manning	218	11.3	
Liberal Democrats	Joan Baktis	214	11.1	
Liberal Democrats	Benjamin Newman	185	9.6	
Liberal Democrats	Jack Fleming	167	8.7	
Turnout		1,926	27.4	
Labour win (new boundaries)				
Labour win (new boundaries)				
Labour win (new boundaries)				

== 2002–2022 Camden council elections ==
King's Cross ward boundaries from 2002 to 2022

There was a revision of ward boundaries in Camden in 2002. The ward covered parts of the Bloomsbury and Kings Cross neighbourhoods. It was separated from Bloomsbury ward by Upper Woburn Place, Tavistock Square, Tavistock Place, Hunter Street, and Grenville Street; from Holborn and Covent Garden ward by Guilford Street and Calthorpe Street; from the borough of Islington by Kings Cross Road and Pentonville Road; and from St Pancras and Somers Town by Euston Road.

The population of the ward at the 2011 Census was 11,843. In 2018, the ward had an electorate of 7,274.

=== 2018 election ===
The election took place on 3 May 2018.

2018 Camden London Borough Council election: King's Cross
Party	Candidate	Votes	%	±%
Labour	Jonathan Simpson	1,191	60.6	+10.0
Labour	Georgie Robertson	1,180	60.1	+4.4
Labour	Abdul Hai	1,130	57.5	+3.5
Green	Emma Barker	377	19.2	−1.7
Conservative	Robyn Gardner	281	14.3	−1.0
Conservative	Adam Lester	242	12.3	−4.1
Liberal Democrats	Elizabeth Jones	239	12.2	+2.2
Conservative	Samuel Dyas	205	10.4	−4.8
Green	Nicola Hart	198	10.1	−7.3
Liberal Democrats	Mark Johnson	174	8.9	−0.1
Liberal Democrats	Ekaterina Kirk	171	8.7	+1.3
Green	Les Levidow	157	8.0	−8.9
Democrats and Veterans	Robert Connor	62	3.2	N/A
Turnout			29.72	
Labour hold		Swing		
Labour hold		Swing		
Labour hold		Swing		

=== 2014 election ===
The election took place on 22 May 2014.

2014 Camden London Borough Council election: King's Cross
Party	Candidate	Votes	%	±%
Labour	Sarah Hayward	1,467		
Labour	Jonathan Simpson	1,424		
Labour	Abdul Hai	1,333		
Green	Brian Gascoigne	550		
Green	Dominic Kendrick	459		
Green	Lewis Sullivan	446		
Conservative	Adam Lester	431		
Conservative	Ivan Massow	403		
Conservative	Patsy Prince	401		
Liberal Democrats	Elizabeth Jones	263		
Liberal Democrats	Jon Burden	236		
Liberal Democrats	Michael Skinner	195		
Turnout		7631	34.5	
Labour hold		Swing		
Labour hold		Swing		
Labour hold		Swing		

=== 2010 election ===
The election on 6 May 2010 took place on the same day as the United Kingdom general election.

2010 Camden London Borough Council election: King's Cross
Party	Candidate	Votes	%	±%
Labour	Sarah Hayward	1,844	14.27	
Labour	Abdul Hai	1,706	13.21	
Labour	Jonathan Simpson	1,681	13.01	
Liberal Democrats	Lee Baker	1,546	11.97	
Liberal Democrats	Yuan Potts	1,386	10.73	
Liberal Democrats	Huw Prior	1,283	9.93	
Conservative	Kashem Abdul	771	5.97	
Conservative	Piers Lindsay-Finn	742	5.74	
Conservative	Andrew Parkinson	703	5.44	
Green	Edward Milford	454	3.51	
Green	Rienzi Trento	337	2.61	
Green	Una Sapietis	427	3.31	
Turnout		12,880	53.42	
Labour hold		Swing		
Labour hold		Swing		
Labour hold		Swing		

=== 2006 election ===
The election took place on 4 May 2006.

2006 Camden London Borough Council election: King's Cross
Party	Candidate	Votes	%	±%
Labour	Abdul Hai	1,071		
Labour	Jonathan Simpson	956		
Labour	Geethika Jayatilaka	946		
Liberal Democrats	Trevor Harris	662		
Liberal Democrats	Huw Prior	627		
Liberal Democrats	David Simmons	600		
Conservative	Barbara Douglass	483		
Conservative	Paul Christian	476		
Conservative	Jamieson Hunkin	424		
Green	Joy Wood	375		
Green	Kate Gordon	360		
Green	Neil Endicott	355		
Independent	Alem-Seged Abay	182		
Turnout		7,517	31.3	
Labour hold		Swing		
Labour hold		Swing		
Labour hold		Swing		

=== 2002 election ===
The election took place on 2 May 2002.

2002 Camden London Borough Council election: King's Cross
Party	Candidate	Votes	%	±%
Labour	Barbara Hughes	855	52.3	
Labour	Geethika Jayatilaka	730	44.6	
Labour	Nick Smith	710	43.4	
Conservative	Barbara Douglass	353	21.6	
Conservative	Charles Costa	344	21.0	
Conservative	Mark Haley	318	19.4	
Liberal Democrats	Diana Brown	310	18.9	
Liberal Democrats	Nicholas Tucker	243	14.9	
Liberal Democrats	Erich Wagner	216	13.2	
Green	Richard Thomas	169	10.3	
Green	Audrey Poppy	157	9.6	
Green	Lucia Nella	149	9.1	
CPA	Elsa Pontes-Betee	46	2.8	
Turnout		4,600		
Labour win (new boundaries)				
Labour win (new boundaries)				
Labour win (new boundaries)				

== 1978–2002 Camden council elections ==
There was a revision of ward boundaries in Camden in 1978.

=== 1998 election ===
The election took place on 7 May 1998.

1998 Camden London Borough Council election: King's Cross
Party	Candidate	Votes	%	±%
Labour	Barbara Hughes	833		
Labour	Nick Smith	766		
Conservative	James Atkin	269		
Liberal Democrats	Rosemary Gandy	240		
Liberal Democrats	Eleanor Freedman	232		
Conservative	Robert Ricketts	211		
Turnout		2,551	28.6	
Labour hold		Swing		
Labour hold		Swing		

=== 1994 election ===
The election took place on 5 May 1994.

1994 Camden London Borough Council election: King's Cross
Party	Candidate	Votes	%	±%
Labour	Angus Walker	1,180		
Labour	John White	1,109		
Conservative	Grace Gorer	333		
Conservative	Norma Simon	314		
Liberal Democrats	David Charlesworth	300		
Turnout			35.8%	
Labour hold		Swing		
Labour hold		Swing		

=== 1990 election ===
The election took place on 3 May 1990.

1990 Camden London Borough Council election: King's Cross
Party	Candidate	Votes	%	±%
Labour	Gloria Lazenby	1,079	51.00	
Labour	John White	969		
Conservative	George Glossop	438	21.01	
Conservative	John Wilson	405		
Green	John Simpson	263	13.10	
Liberal Democrats	Casper Wrede	158	7.87	
Camden Charter	Cathal McGirr	141	7.02	
Registered electors		4,535		
Turnout		1866	41.15	
Rejected ballots		9	0.48	
Labour hold				
Labour hold				

=== 1986 election ===
The election took place on 8 May 1986.

1986 Camden London Borough Council election: King's Cross
Party	Candidate	Votes	%	±%
Labour	Barbara Hughes	1,113		
Labour	Anthony Dykes	1,094		
Conservative	George Glossop	402		
Conservative	James Turner	382		
Alliance	Thomas Hibbert	282		
Turnout				
Labour hold		Swing		
Labour hold		Swing		

=== 1982 election ===
The election took place on 6 May 1982.

1982 Camden London Borough Council election: King's Cross
Party	Candidate	Votes	%	±%
Labour	Barbara Hughes	812		
Labour	Anthony Dykes	802		
Conservative	Anthony Kemp	532		
Conservative	Stephen Robins	526		
Alliance	Thomas Hibbert	411		
Alliance	Derek Lowe	356		
Turnout				
Labour hold		Swing		
Labour hold		Swing		

=== 1981 by-election ===
The by-election took place on 7 May 1981, following the resignation of Roderick Cordara. It was held on the same day as the 1981 Greater London Council election.

1981 King's Cross by-election
Party	Candidate	Votes	%	±%
Labour	Barbara Hughes	813		
Conservative	Derek Lowe	573		
Liberal	Thomas Hibbert	320		
Turnout				
Labour hold		Swing		

=== 1978 election ===
The election took place on 4 May 1978.

1978 Camden London Borough Council election: King's Cross
Party	Candidate	Votes	%	±%
Labour	Anthony Craig	840		
Labour	Roderick Cordara	812		
Conservative	John Glendinning	777		
Conservative	Aileen Griffith	758		
Communist	Patricia Langton	48		
Workers Revolutionary	Margaret Obank	40		
Turnout				
Labour win (new boundaries)				
Labour win (new boundaries)				

== 1971–1978 Camden council elections ==
There was a revision of ward boundaries in Camden in 1971.

=== 1974 election ===
The election took place on 2 May 1974.

1974 Camden London Borough Council election: King's Cross
Party	Candidate	Votes	%	±%
Labour	David Offenbach	1,745	51.8	
Labour	David Windsor	1,730		
Labour	Margaret Robertson	1,721		
Labour	Lyndal Evans	1,698		
Conservative	John Glendinning	1,193	35.4	
Conservative	Graham Hirschfield	1,110		
Conservative	Kenneth Avery	1,108		
Conservative	Kenneth Graham	1,089		
Liberal	John Bishop	431	12.8	
Liberal	Anthony Connell	405		
Liberal	Raymond Marks	363		
Liberal	Margaret Maclaren	360		
Turnout			36.9	
Labour hold		Swing		
Labour hold		Swing		
Labour hold		Swing		
Labour hold		Swing		

=== 1971 election ===
The election took place on 13 May 1971.

1971 Camden London Borough Council election: King's Cross
Party	Candidate	Votes	%	±%
Labour	Lyndal Evans	2,080	58.2	
Labour	Joseph Jacob	2,057		
Labour	Michael Cendrowicz	2,034		
Labour	David Offenbach	2,032		
Conservative	Ian Clarke	1,494	41.8	
Conservative	John Glendinning	1,481		
Conservative	Edith Martin	1,466		
Conservative	Joy Burgess	1,436		
Turnout			36.0	
Labour win (new boundaries)				
Labour win (new boundaries)				
Labour win (new boundaries)				
Labour win (new boundaries)				

== 1964–1971 Camden council elections ==
External images
- King's Cross ward boundaries from 1965 to 1971 (west)
- King's Cross ward boundaries from 1965 to 1971 (east)

King's Cross ward has existed since the creation of the London Borough of Camden on 1 April 1965. It was first used in the 1964 election to Camden London Borough Council.

=== 1968 election ===
The election took place on 9 May 1968.

1968 Camden London Borough Council election: King's Cross
Party	Candidate	Votes	%	±%
Conservative	John Glendinning	1,689	60.5	
Conservative	Ian Clarke	1,680		
Conservative	Thomas Morris	1,672		
Labour	Beverley Rowe	1,106	39.5	
Labour	John Diamond	1,096		
Labour	Louis Bondy	1,083		
Turnout			32.0	
Conservative gain from Labour		Swing		
Conservative gain from Labour		Swing		
Conservative gain from Labour		Swing		

=== 1964 election ===
The election took place on 7 May 1964.

1964 Camden London Borough Council election: King's Cross
Party	Candidate	Votes	%	±%
Labour	Clifford Tucker	1,876		
Labour	John Diamond	1,857		
Labour	Arthur Graves	1,810		
Conservative	Joyce Burgess	1,523		
Conservative	William McGowan	1,492		
Conservative	Thomas Morris	1,473		
Turnout		3,410	36.0	
Labour win (new seat)				
Labour win (new seat)				
Labour win (new seat)				
