= Michael Collins (writer and broadcaster) =

British writer and broadcaster (born 1961)

Michael Collins (born 12 February 1961) is a British author, journalist and television presenter.

== Early life ==
Michael Collins was born in Walworth, south east London, England. He attended Archbishop Michael Ramsey School in Camberwell. In 1977, whilst Collins was a pupil there, the school was the subject of the Thames Television documentary Our School and Hard Times, as part of the 'great debate' about education and schools triggered by a speech by then-UK Prime Minister James Callaghan.

== Career ==
Throughout the 1990s, Collins worked in television production as a scriptwriter and producer. During this time he wrote the Channel 4 documentaries The Battersea Bardot (1994) and The National Alf (1994).

His book The Likes Of Us: A Biography of the White Working Class won the 2005 Orwell Prize for political writing, from a book shortlist that included the broadcaster and journalist Andrew Marr, and the Labour peer Helena Kennedy. For The Sunday Times review of the book, Bryan Appleyard wrote "With The Likes of Us, Collins becomes an anatomist of England to dwarf almost all others. He will make many enemies. But they will be the kind a man ought to have".

The Likes Of Us became the subject of numerous leading broadsheet reviews. The reception was largely positive and praiseworthy, but the book was also the subject of some controversy and minor criticism. Mark Simpson addressed this in his review for the Independent on Sunday: “Now Southwark has produced a new kind of hooligan, one swinging his laptop like a bicycle chain around his head, if you are to believe the scandalised notices in some of the broadsheets. South-east London-born writer Michael Collins has provoked a major breach of the peace. The Independent decried his "low blows" and a guest on Start the Week denounced him as an "intellectual outrider for the BNP"". In his review in The Independent, the sociologist Laurie Taylor described Collins as a "poetic hooligan", and added: “It's a surprise to encounter a quiet, reasonable authorial voice after all the shrill noises of class war generated by the blurbs. Michael Collins, we are told, is here to knock the living daylights out of all those middle-class people who have, over the past two centuries, spent their time patronising and demonising the good old white working class. "He will make thousands of the allegedly 'educated' hang their heads in shame," promises Julie Burchill.”

The English historian David Kynaston summarised The Likes Of Us when, in 2012, he recommended it as one of the five best books on social history in post-war Britain: “This book goes into quite brave territory. Collins argues that the white working class has become the only bit of society left that can be demonised by the liberal intelligentsia. This gives him the starting point for a history of the white working class, based very much on where he grew up – the Elephant and Castle district in south London.” In 2016, Kynaston was one of a number of writers asked by The Guardian to select a book to ‘make sense of Brexit’, he chose The Like Of Us : “Since the small hours of 24 June, my thoughts have kept turning back to 2004. Partly because that summer’s Euros saw the coming of the Age of Rooney, an English footballing era now almost certainly ended by the stout-hearted Icelanders. More because that was when the first impact was about to be felt of the Labour government’s grotesque miscalculation about the numbers arriving from the New Europe. And above all because that was when I first read Michael Collins’s then newly published The Likes of Us: A Biography of the White Working Class (Granta).” He concluded by saying that, a decade on, the book remains ‘an indispensable slice of contemporary history’.

== Race, Class and Controversy ==
In 2020 Collins returned to the subject of the book, referring to the charges levelled by critics at the time of its publication. He writes: "My crime was twofold. First, I assigned this urban tribe the status of an ethnic group. Second, I implied they’d been demonised by the loftiest champions of the proletariat."

The criticism of Collins over the issue of race also related to his take on the reporting of the murder of black teenager Stephen Lawrence in Eltham, south London, in 1993. The columnist Yasmin Alibhai-Brown writing for The Independent in 2009, said of Collins that "true to class he hits on blacks and Asians, even proffering an intellectual alibi for the killers of Stephen Lawrence."

Collins has frequently returned to the reporting of the Lawrence murder, citing what he considers a double standard compared to the attention given to the death of teenager Richard Everitt at the hands of a gang of Bangladeshi boys in Somerstown, north London, in 1994. Writing in The Critic in 2020, Collins details his efforts to report on the details of the Everitt murder, and his reasons: "The details of the Lawrence story have been justly documented at length and will be aired again in a three-part sequel to the 1999 ITV drama The Murder of Stephen Lawrence. A recent BBC film dramatised the murder of black teenager Anthony Walker on Merseyside in 2005, for which the brother of footballer Joey Barton was charged, but films relating to Richard Everitt have been conspicuous by their absence. This is therefore an apposite moment to tell a story I’ve attempted to tell previously."

April 22 is recognised as Stephen Lawrence Day since 2019, having been established by the Prime Minister Theresa May the previous year. On the thirtieth anniversary of the Lawrence murder, Collins wrote in Spiked on the outcome of the cases of both Stephen Lawrence and Richard Everitt thirty years on: "The murder of Stephen Lawrence had such an impact that there is a commemorative plaque on the street where he was murdered, and the anniversary of his murder has been commemorated since 2019. Today, as we’re encouraged to remember a teenager’s murder that attracted so much interest and media attention, maybe we should also reflect on Richard Everitt and other innocents, black or white, whose lives were cut short by the blade or the bullet, but whose deaths didn’t warrant the column inches and the screen time. Perhaps because they didn’t fit the customary narrative on race. Share their stories. Say their names."

== Television ==
On publication The Likes Of Us was serialised in The Guardian'' and later became the Channel 4 documentary The British Working Class, written and presented by Collins. The film was the first in a series of three documentaries on the British class system. The historian and academic Tristram Hunt presented the middle classes, with the final film in the series, on the upper classes, presented by the author James Delingpole.

In 2011, Collins wrote and presented The Great Estate, a documentary about social housing in the UK. broadcast on BBC4 and BBC2.

His BBC4 documentary on suburbia, Everyday Eden: A Potted History of the Suburban Garden was broadcast in April 2014.

Collins has contributed to BBC TV's The Culture Show and The Politics Show as well as Radio 4's Start the Week, Woman's Hour, Saturday Review and The Long View.

He has also written on television, film, new media, politics and history for newspapers and magazines, including the Observer, Guardian, Independent, TLS, Sunday Telegraph, Prospect, New Statesman, Literary Review, Wallpaper, French Vogue and The Sunday Times.

Collins fronts the New Culture Forum films White Privilege? (2021) and Labour's New Class War (2022). In 2024 he co-produced the 90-minute documentary The Pilgrimage of Gilbert & George broadcast on Sky Arts May 2024. The East End-based artists are also the subject of an essay written by Collins, published in April 2025.
