= West Hampstead (ward) =

Ward in Camden, London, United Kingdom

- Electoral ward for the Camden London Borough Council
- West Hampstead ward boundaries since 2022
- Borough: Camden
- County: Greater London
- Population: 11,162 (2021) (Note: 2021 Census data reported for 2022 ward boundaries)
- Electorate: 7,993 (2022)
- Area: 0.7695 square kilometres (0.2971 sq mi)

Current electoral ward
- Created: 2002
- Number of members: 3
- Councillors: Patrick Stillman; Aarti Wadhwani; Janet Grauberg
- ONS code: 00AGGX (2002–2022)
- GSS code: E05000145 (2002–2022); E05013671 (2022–present)

West Hampstead is a ward in the London Borough of Camden, in the United Kingdom. It was established for the May 2002 local elections. The population of West Hampstead ward is 11,658, while the ward had an electorate of 8,322 in 2018. It underwent minor boundary changes for the 2022 election. As of 2024, it forms part of the Hampstead and Highgate parliamentary constituency, whose MP is Tulip Siddiq (Labour).

== List of councillors ==
Term	Councillor	Party
2002–2014	Keith Moffitt	Liberal Democrats
2002–2014	John Bryant	Liberal Democrats
2002–2006	Heather Thompson	Liberal Democrats
2006–2010	Duncan Greenland	Liberal Democrats
2010–2014	Gillian Risso-Gill	Liberal Democrats
2014–2018	Phil Rosenberg	Labour
2014–2018	Angela Pober	Labour
2014–2018	James Yarde	Labour
2018–present	Nazma Rahman	Labour
2018–2025	Shiva Tiwari (Note: Shiva Tiwari changed parties in 2025.)	Labour
2018–2025	Shiva Tiwari	Conservative
2018–2022	Peter Taheri	Labour
2022–2026	Sharon Hardwick	Labour
2025–present	Janet Grauberg	Liberal Democrats
2026–present	Patrick Stillman	Liberal Democrats
2026–present	Aarti Wadwani	Liberal Democrats

== Camden council elections since 2022 ==
There was a revision of ward boundaries in Camden in 2022.

=== 2026 election ===
The election took place on 7 May 2026

2026 Camden London Borough Council election: West Hampstead

Party	Candidate	Votes	%	±%
Liberal Democrats	Janet Grauberg*	1,421		
Liberal Democrats	Patrick Stillman	1,164		
Liberal Democrats	Aarti Wadhwani	1,068		
Labour	Sharon Hardwick*	782		
Green	Jane Walby	661		
Labour	Leo Gordon	629		
Green	Les Levidow	601		
Labour	Tabby Merrison-Galvin	596		
Green	Jason Pritchard	586		
Conservative	Ewan Cameron	376		
Conservative	Jacob Solon	298		
Conservative	Aarti Joshi	268		
Reform	Eitan Saloniki	224		
Reform	Julios Samarxhiu	201		
Turnout				

=== 2025 by-election ===
The by-election took place on 28 August 2025, following the resignation of Shiva Tiwari. On 18 March 2025, Tiwari defected from the Labour Party to the Conservative Party. CCTV footage published on 17 July 2025 showed a confrontation with a shop owner in West Hampstead, during which Tiwari threatened to close the business down. He resigned from the Conservative Party and the council the same day.

2025 West Hampstead by-election
Party	Candidate	Votes	%	±%
Liberal Democrats	Janet Grauberg	1,176	54.4	+15.5
Labour	Francesca Reynolds	458	21.2	−23.3
Conservative	Ian Cohen	222	10.3	−6.2
Reform	Thomas Sterling	155	7.2	+7.2
Green	Matthew Hull	152	7.0	+7.0
Majority		718	33.2	
Turnout		2,163		
Liberal Democrats gain from Labour		Swing		

=== 2022 election ===
The election took place on 5 May 2022.

2022 Camden London Borough Council election: West Hampstead
Party	Candidate	Votes	%	±%
Labour	Sharon Hardwick	1,332	16.17	
Labour	Nazma Rahman	1,262	15.32	
Labour	Shiva Tiwari	1,202	14.59	
Liberal Democrats	Janet Grauberg	1,164	14.13	
Liberal Democrats	David Elkan	964	11.70	
Liberal Democrats	Elizabeth Pearson	963	11.69	
Conservative	Ian Cohen	494	6.00	
Conservative	Marcos Gold	449	5.45	
Conservative	Peter Horne	407	4.94	
Turnout		8,237	35.8	
Labour win (new boundaries)				
Labour win (new boundaries)				
Labour win (new boundaries)				

== 2002–2022 Camden council elections ==
West Hampstead ward boundaries from 2002 to 2022

=== 2018 election ===
The election took place on 3 May 2018.

2018 Camden London Borough Council election: West Hampstead
Party	Candidate	Votes	%	±%
Labour	Nazma Rahman	1,390	14.4	
Labour	Shiva Tiwari	1,267	13.1	
Labour	Peter Taheri	1,260	13.0	
Conservative	David Brescia	940	9.7	
Liberal Democrats	Roger Fox	878	9.1	
Conservative	Sedef Akademir	819	8.4	
Liberal Democrats	Nancy Jirira	777	8.0	
Conservative	Mohammed Salim	739	7.6	
Liberal Democrats	Mukul Hira	723	7.4	
Green	Jane Milton	335	3.4	
Green	Helena Paul	290	3.0	
Green	David Stansell	229	2.3	
Turnout		9,647	38.0	
Labour hold		Swing		
Labour hold		Swing		
Labour hold		Swing		

=== 2014 election ===
The election took place on 22 May 2014.

2014 Camden London Borough Council election: West Hampstead
Party	Candidate	Votes	%	±%
Labour	Phil Rosenberg	1,179		
Labour	Angela Pober	1,166		
Labour	James Yarde	1,082		
Liberal Democrats	Keith Moffitt	943		
Liberal Democrats	Gillian Risso-Gill	901		
Liberal Democrats	John Bryant	836		
Conservative	Nick Grierson	811		
Conservative	Natalie Eliades	800		
Conservative	Andrew Saywell	715		
Green	Zane Hannan	343		
Green	Richard Griffiths	327		
Green	Quentin Tyler	250		
UKIP	Magnus Nielsen	202		
TUSC	David Pearce	67		
Turnout		9,622	38.0	
Labour gain from Liberal Democrats		Swing		
Labour gain from Liberal Democrats		Swing		
Labour gain from Liberal Democrats		Swing		

=== 2010 election ===
The election on 6 May 2010 took place on the same day as the United Kingdom general election.

2010 Camden London Borough Council election: West Hampstead
Party	Candidate	Votes	%	±%
Liberal Democrats	John Bryant	2,061	38.0	−3.7
Liberal Democrats	Keith Moffitt	2,014	37.1	−9.2
Liberal Democrats	Gillian Risso-Gill	1,688	31.1	−6.8
Labour	Virginia Berridge	1,611	29.7	+3.5
Conservative	Paul Ratner	1,521	28.0	+6.8
Conservative	Paul Church	1,445	26.6	+8.0
Labour	Carol Thomas	1,292	23.8	+0.5
Conservative	Boris Telyatnikov	1,276	23.5	+5.9
Labour	Miles Seaman	1,258	23.2	+2.0
Green	Tobias Davidson	499	9.2	−2.8
Green	Roderick Graham	417	7.7	−4.0
Green	Stuart Taylor	355	6.5	−4.2
Turnout		5,436	61.8	+30.6
Liberal Democrats hold		Swing		
Liberal Democrats hold		Swing		
Liberal Democrats hold		Swing		

=== 2006 election ===
The election took place on 4 May 2006.

2006 Camden London Borough Council election: West Hampstead
Party	Candidate	Votes	%	±%
Liberal Democrats	Keith Moffitt	1,189	46.3	−7.2
Liberal Democrats	John Bryant	1,107	41.7	−6.9
Liberal Democrats	Duncan Greenland	974	37.9	−10.1
Labour	Virginia Berridge	672	26.2	−0.6
Labour	Geoffrey Kingscote	598	23.3	−0.7
Labour	Charles Hedges	545	21.2	−1.0
Conservative	Elaine Mackover	544	21.2	+8.5
Conservative	John Samiotis	478	18.6	+7.3
Conservative	Marcus Watzlaff	451	17.6	+5.0
Green	Lucy Thomas	309	12.0	−0.1
Green	Debra Green	300	11.7	+3.5
Green	Kari-Lourdes Dewar	275	10.7	+3.0
Turnout		7,442	31.2	
Liberal Democrats hold		Swing		
Liberal Democrats hold		Swing		
Liberal Democrats hold		Swing		

=== 2002 election ===
The election took place on 2 May 2002.

2002 Camden London Borough Council election: West Hampstead
Party	Candidate	Votes	%	±%
Liberal Democrats	Keith Moffitt	1,133	53.5	
Liberal Democrats	John Bryant	1,028	48.6	
Liberal Democrats	Heather Thompson	1,016	48.0	
Labour	Marie Bardsley	567	26.8	
Labour	Michael Broughton	507	24.0	
Labour	Mari Williams	469	22.2	
Conservative	Joanna Galloway	268	12.7	
Conservative	Simon Cliff	267	12.6	
Green	Samantha Baber	256	12.1	
Conservative	John Samiotis	240	11.3	
Green	Michael Hewitt-Hicks	173	8.2	
Green	Lawrie Scovell	163	7.7	
Turnout		6,087		
Liberal Democrats win (new seat)				
Liberal Democrats win (new seat)				
Liberal Democrats win (new seat)				
