= Claire-Louise Leyland =

British politician

Leader of the Opposition on Camden Borough Council
- In office May 2014 – February 2018
- Preceded by: Keith Moffitt
- Succeeded by: Gio Spinella

Leader of the Conservative Group on Camden Borough Council
- In office May 2013 – February 2018
- Preceded by: Andrew Mennear
- Succeeded by: Gio Spinella

Councillor for Belsize
- In office May 2010 – May 2018

Personal details
- Born: South Africa
- Party: Conservative

Claire-Louise Vaculik (née Leyland) is an English Conservative politician. She was the leader of the Conservatives on Camden London Borough Council from 2014 to 2018, and represented Belsize on the council from 2010 to 2018. She has stood unsuccessfully for Parliament twice: in West Tyrone in 2015 and her home seat of Hampstead and Kilburn in 2017.

== Early life and education ==
Leyland was born in South Africa and attended Wynberg Girls' High School in Cape Town, followed by Stellenbosch University and Rhodes University. She moved to London in 1998 to study further at Goldsmiths and Middlesex University.

== Career ==
Leyland is an art therapist by profession, and is the chair of the British Association of Art Therapists, the British professional body for art therapists. She edited the book Integrative Arts Psychotherapy.

Leyland was elected to Camden London Borough Council in 2010 to represent Belsize, and won the seat back from the Liberal Democrats. She became the leader of the Conservatives in 2013 (when they were the third largest party) and became the leader of the opposition in 2014, when the Liberal Democrats lost all but one seat. As leader of the opposition, she made national news by advocating more CCTV in Belsize Park, and criticising Camden Council for spending money on publicising the fact it had no money.

At the 2015 general election, Leyland stood as the Conservative candidate for West Tyrone in Northern Ireland. She came eighth and lost her deposit, being just three votes ahead of the last-placed candidate. It was the party's sixth-lowest vote share at that election.

Leyland voted to remain in the 2016 EU referendum. She was selected for Hampstead and Kilburn at the 2017 general election, beating Henry Newman and Kemi Badenoch, and her candidacy in the strongly anti-Brexit constituency was dubbed 'Clash of the Remainers'. She was criticised for downplaying being a Conservative and instead being promoted as "Theresa May's candidate". Leyland finished as a distant second, with a large swing towards the Labour incumbent, Tulip Siddiq. Leyland stood down from Camden Council in 2018.

== Electoral results ==
2010 Camden local election - Belsize ward (3 seats)
Party	Candidate	Votes	%	±%
Conservative	Jonny Bucknell	1,969	36.1	−1.0
Conservative	Claire-Louise Leyland	1,969	36.1	−0.1
Liberal Democrats	Tom Simon *	1,949	35.7	−5.1
Conservative	Nigel Rumble	1,897	34.8	−0.9
Liberal Democrats	Anne Ward	1,746	32.0	−8.5
Liberal Democrats	Paul Perkins	1,727	31.7	−6.4
Labour	Samantha Gunasekera	1,094	20.1	+6.2
Labour	Sada Deshmukh	1,051	19.3	+5.1
Labour	Luca Salice	1,027	18.8	+6.5
Green	Anya Courts	410	7.5	−0.3
Green	Sophie North	372	6.8	−1.6
Green	Francesca Richards-Spiller	325	6.0	−0.2
BNP	Derek Collins	90	1.7	N/A
Turnout		5,454	62.3	+24.0
Conservative gain from Liberal Democrats		Swing		
Conservative gain from Liberal Democrats		Swing		
Liberal Democrats hold		Swing		

2014 Camden local election - Belsize ward (3 seats)
Party	Candidate	Votes	%	±%
Conservative	Jonny Bucknell*	1,219	37.3	+1.2
Conservative	Claire-Louise Leyland *	1,157	35.4	−0.7
Conservative	Leila Roy	1,016	31.1	−3.7
Liberal Democrats	Tom Simon*	992	30.3	−5.4
Labour	Madeleine Jennings	939	28.7	+8.6
Labour	James McGowan	782	23.9	+4.6
Liberal Democrats	Bradley Hillier-Smith	760	23.2	−8.8
Labour	Harunur Rashid	709	21.7	+2.9
Liberal Democrats	Lawrence Joseph Nicholson	678	20.7	−11.0
Green	Rowan St Clair	275	8.4	+0.9
Green	Darren Robert Murphy	269	8.2	+1.4
Green	Stuart Temple Taylor	243	7.4	+1.4
Independent	Nigel Rumble	199	6.1	−28.7
Turnout		9,257	38.3	−24.0
Conservative hold		Swing		
Conservative hold		Swing		
Conservative gain from Liberal Democrats		Swing		

General election 2015: West Tyrone
Party	Candidate	Votes	%	±%
Sinn Féin	Pat Doherty	16,807	43.5	―4.9
DUP	Thomas Buchanan	6,747	17.5	―2.3
SDLP	Daniel McCrossan	6,444	16.7	+2.7
UUP	Ross Hussey	6,144	15.9	+1.7
Alliance	Stephen Donnelly	869	2.2	―0.1
Green (NI)	Ciaran McClean	780	2.0	New
CISTA	Barry Brown	528	1.4	New
NI Conservatives	Claire-Louise Leyland	169	0.4	New
Independent	Susan-Anne White	166	0.4	New
Majority		10,060	26.0	―2.6
Turnout		38,654	60.5	―0.5
Registered electors		63,856		
Sinn Féin hold		Swing	―1.3	

General election 2017: Hampstead and Kilburn
Party	Candidate	Votes	%	±%
Labour	Tulip Siddiq	34,464	59.0	▲14.6
Conservative	Claire-Louise Leyland	18,904	32.4	▼9.9
Liberal Democrats	Kirsty Allan	4,100	7.0	▲1.4
Green	John Mansook	742	1.3	▼3.1
Independent	Hugh Easterbrook	136	0.2	New
Independent	Rainbow George Weiss	61	0.1	New
Majority		15,560	26.6	▲24.5
Turnout		58,407	70.4	▲3.1
Registered electors		82,957		
Labour hold		Swing	▲12.3	
