= Keith Moffitt =

British politician

- Moffitt in 2015

Leader of Camden Council
- In office 24 May 2006 – May 2010
- Deputy: Andrew Marshall
- Preceded by: Raj Chada
- Succeeded by: Nasim Ali

Opposition Leader on Camden London Borough Council
- In office 2010–2014
- Preceded by: Nasim Ali
- Succeeded by: Claire-Louise Leyland

Lib Dem Group Leader on Camden Council
- In office 12 May 2005 – 22 May 2014
- Preceded by: Flick Rea
- Succeeded by: Flick Rea

Camden Borough Councillor for West Hampstead
- In office 5 May 1994 – 22 May 2014
- Succeeded by: Phil Rosenberg

Personal details
- Party: Liberal Democrat

Keith Moffitt is a British Liberal Democrat local government politician. He was a Councillor for West Hampstead from 1994, and in the local elections of May 2006 became the first ever Liberal Democrat Leader of Camden London Borough Council, ending Labour's 35-year hold on the borough. He was also the first openly gay leader of the council.

In the May 2010 local elections, Moffitt was re-elected for his West Hampstead seat, but removed as Council leader as Labour re-took control of the borough. Following the delayed Haverstock elections, which gave his party a higher number of seats than the Conservatives, he served as Leader of the Opposition. He lost his seat in the 2014 election.

== Career ==
Moffitt speaks fluent French, German and Portuguese. In 2004 he ran in the European elections to represent London in the European Parliament.

Before becoming leader of the council Moffitt worked as a translator. He previously had a 20-year career with British Coal, working in International Relations and European Community affairs, and was Chairman of the United Nations Working Party on Coal Trade from 1986 to 1992.

In 2006 Moffitt suspended his professional career in order to focus on his new role leading Camden Council. He subsequently resumed his career in languages and went on to become Chair of Council of the Chartered Institute of Linguists from 2012 to 2016.

== Policies ==
Moffitt campaigned on a platform of freezing the Council Tax in his first year of office and, together with his Conservative coalition partners, honoured this pledge through the council's "Better and Cheaper" agenda. This cost-cutting programme attracted significant criticism from the opposition Labour party.
