= Sarah Hayward =

British politician

Leader of Camden Council
- In office 16 May 2012 – 17 May 2017
- Deputy: Pat Callaghan
- Preceded by: Nasim Ali
- Succeeded by: Georgia Gould

Labour Group Leader on Camden Council
- In office 10 May 2012 – 2 May 2017
- Deputy: Pat Callaghan
- Preceded by: Nasim Ali
- Succeeded by: Georgia Gould

Camden Borough Councillor for King's Cross ward
- In office 6 May 2010 – 3 May 2018 Serving with Abdul Hai, Jonathan Simpson
- Preceded by: Geethika Jayatilaka
- Succeeded by: Georgie Robertson

Personal details
- Party: Labour
- Spouse: Dan
- Education: University of Hull

Sarah Hayward is a British Labour Party politician who was Leader of the London Borough of Camden from 2012 to 2017. She successfully challenged Nasim Ali for leadership of the Labour group in 2012.

== Early life and career ==
Hayward grew up in Oxfordshire in a single-parent family, in which her mother worked in low paid jobs and she worked as a 12-year-old to supplement her mother's earnings. She describes this as a defining moment attracting her to socialism. She graduated from the University of Hull with a degree in law and politics. She then moved to London and worked at Sainsbury's for two years, before joining a publishing company. She joined the Ministry of Defence before resigning in protest over the Invasion of Iraq. Hayward says she was drawn to Camden by a "love of grungy pubs and even grungier music".

== Political career ==
Before being elected, she worked for the London Labour Party and the Fawcett Society. She has represented the King's Cross ward since 2010 and entered Cabinet as Member for Communities, Regeneration and Equalities. She currently serves as a member of the Health and Wellbeing Board and a number of sub-committees. In 2013 she strongly defended the council against a report by the Taxpayers Alliance on Channel 5 News. In 2014, she sought to be selected as Labour candidate to replace retiring incumbent Frank Dobson; however, Keir Starmer was selected instead. She has written a number of articles for The Guardian.

Hayward supported Liz Kendall during the 2015 Labour Party leadership election despite the Holborn and St Pancras Labour Party endorsing Jeremy Corbyn. Corbyn was the eventual winner, with Kendall coming last with less than 5% of the vote.

In 2016, she saw off an unsuccessful leadership challenge by cabinet colleague Sally Gimson.

Hayward announced she was standing down from the leadership of Camden Council in April 2017 and did not stand for re-election as a councillor at the May 2018 council elections. She was succeeded as leader of Camden Council by Georgia Gould.
