= Regent's Park (Camden ward) =

London Borough of Camden ward

- Electoral ward for the Camden London Borough Council
- Regent's Park (Camden) ward boundaries since 2022
- Borough: Camden
- County: Greater London
- Population: 11,926 (2021) (Note: 2021 Census data reported for 2022 ward boundaries)
- Electorate: 8,074 (2022)
- Area: 1.350 square kilometres (0.521 sq mi)

Current electoral ward
- Created: 1965
- Number of members: 1965–1971: 3; 1971–1978: 4; 1978–present: 3
- Councillors: Victoria Mery; Ruman Jaigirdar; Nanouche Umeadi
- GSS code: E05013668 (2022–present)

Regent's Park is a ward in the London Borough of Camden, in the United Kingdom. The ward has existed since the creation of the borough on 1 April 1965 and was first used in the 1964 elections. The ward was redrawn in May 1978 and May 2002. In 2018, the ward had an electorate of 8,959.

== Camden council elections since 2022 ==
=== 2026 by-election ===
The by-election took place on 9 July 2026, following the disqualification of Muhammad Naser.

2026 Regent's Park by-election
Party	Candidate	Votes	%	±%
Labour	Nanouche Umeadi	576	32.4	
Green	Alice Brown	482	27.1	
Independent	Mohammad Khan	407	22.9	
Conservative	Vladimir Chorniy	137	7.7	
Reform	Janet Martin	123	6.9	
Liberal Democrats	Windle Potts	51	2.9	
Majority		94	5.3	
Turnout		1,776		
Labour gain from Green		Swing		

=== 2026 election ===
The election took place on 7 May 2026.

2026 Camden London Borough Council election: Regent's Park
Party	Candidate	Votes	%	±%
Green	Victoria Mery	1,138		
Green	Muhammed Naser	1,054		
Green	Ruman Jaigirdar	1,010		
Labour	Nasim Ali	973		
Labour	Heather Johnson	929		
Labour	Nadia Shah	905		
Reform	Sean Fairbrother	354		
Reform	Dean Goldenberg	331		
Reform	Beverley Martin	321		
Conservative	Martin Sheppard	274		
Conservative	Vladimir Chorniy	262		
Conservative	Alexandra Marsanu	240		
Liberal Democrats	Christopher Gayford	189		
Liberal Democrats	Mary Stainer	170		
Liberal Democrats	Farhan Islam	113		
National Housing Party	Jose Fafian	46		
Turnout				
Green gain from Labour		Swing		
Green gain from Labour		Swing		
Green gain from Labour		Swing		

=== 2022 election ===
The election took place on 5 May 2022.

2022 Camden London Borough Council election: Regent's Park
Party	Candidate	Votes	%	±%
Labour	Heather Johnson	1,552	63.4	
Labour	Nadia Shah	1,516	61.9	
Labour	Nasim Ali	1,504	61.4	
Green	Hugo Plowden	423	17.3	
Conservative	George Aspinall	413	16.9	
Conservative	Joanna Reeves	390	15.9	
Conservative	Martin Sheppard	355	14.5	
Liberal Democrats	Mary Stanier	251	10.3	
Liberal Democrats	Samuel Campling	206	8.4	
Liberal Democrats	Christopher Gayford	188	7.7	
Let London Live	Karin Radicke	114	4.7	
Turnout		2,448	30.3	
Labour win (new boundaries)				
Labour win (new boundaries)				
Labour win (new boundaries)				
