= Nasim Ali =

British Labour Party politician, councillor (born 1969)

Nasim Ali OBE
- নাসিম আলী

Leader of Camden London Borough Council
- In office 26 May 2010 – 9 May 2012
- Deputy: Angela Mason (2010–2011); Sue Vincent (2011–2012)
- Preceded by: Keith Moffitt
- Succeeded by: Sarah Hayward

Labour Group Leader on Camden London Borough Council
- In office 12 May 2009 – 10 May 2012
- Deputy: Jonathan Simpson (2009–2010); Angela Mason (2010–2011); Sue Vincent (2011–2012)
- Preceded by: Anna Stewart
- Succeeded by: Sarah Hayward

Mayor of Camden
- In office 14 May 2003 – 13 May 2004
- Deputy: Harriet Garland
- Preceded by: Judith Pattison
- Succeeded by: Harriet Garland

Camden London Borough Councillor for Regent's Park
- In office 2 May 2002 – 7 May 2026
- Preceded by: James Turner

Personal details
- Born: 7 February 1969 (age 57) Islampur, Shah Paran Thana, Sylhet, East Pakistan
- Party: Labour
- Spouses: Amanda (m. 2003, divorced): Lina Choudhury
- Children: 3
- Education: University of Kent
- Occupation: Executive Director
- Profession: Politician

Nasim "Nash" Ali (Bengali: নাসিম আলী; born 7 February 1969) is a British Labour Party politician, former councillor for Regent's Park, former Cabinet Member for Young People in Camden Council and former Mayor of Camden. In May 2003, at the age of 34, after being elected Mayor of Camden, he became the UK's youngest mayor, as well as the first Bangladeshi and first Muslim mayor.

In 2026 he lost his seat.

== Early life ==
Ali was born in Islampur, Shah Paran Thana, Sylhet District, East Pakistan (now Bangladesh) and came to the United Kingdom at the age of seven in 1976. He grew up on the Regent's Park Estate. He attended Netley Primary School and South Camden Community School, he left with one O-level in Art.

In 2001, Ali graduated with a BA in Informal and Community Education by distance learning from the University of Kent.

Ali's elder brother, Sitar, is treasurer of the Bengali Workers' Association.

== Early career ==
In November 1984, Ali took his family to join the "occupation" of the Town Hall following the death of a Bangladeshi family in a bed-and-breakfast hotel in Westminster. Five years later, he worked with Camden Law Centre to establish Camden Monitoring Project to provide safe transport for Bangladeshi men being attacked by skinheads on their way home from work. At the time, his father was working as a chef and his younger brother owned a pizza shop.

Since the 1980s, Ali has been active in the Regent's Park Estate local community. Since the age of 14, he has been involved in voluntary work. In 1989, he established the Camden Monitoring Group to combat racial harassment. In the same year, he was seconded from Camden Youth Service to become a part-time volunteer for the community and social welfare charity Bengali Workers' Association. Also that year, he enrolled onto Kingway College (now known as Westminster Kingsway College) and obtained B grades in both GCSE English language and mathematics.

In August 1994, he established Camden United Project to unite conflicting young people from white and Asian communities together in the borough, through their common interest in football, diverting them away from racism, crime and conflict.

While working as an assistant in a clothes shop in Kentish Town, Ali's manager advised him to better himself. Ali moved on to work for British Telecom, which is where he acquired his nickname "Nash". In 1995, he left British Telecom and joined King's Cross Brunswick Neighbourhood Association as a trainee youth worker. Ali acquired his distance-learning degree from the YMCA George Williams College while working full-time.

== Political career ==
Since May 1993, Ali has been a Labour Party member. After his elder brother, Sitar, encouraged him to stand for the council, in May 2002, in the Camden London Borough Council election, he was elected councillor for the Regent's Park ward. In May 2003, at the age of 34, Ali became Mayor of Camden and the youngest mayor in the country, as well as the UK's first Bangladeshi and first Muslim mayor. He was succeeded by being Harriet Garland the following year. In May 2004, he became Executive Member for Community Engagement. Ali was also the first Bangladeshi Executive Member and the first Bangladeshi Leader of the Labour Group and Camden Council.

In 1995, he joined the King's Cross Brunswick Neighbourhood Association charity and has been Executive Director since January 2001. Since 2002, he been councillor for Regent's Park ward, with a focus on diverting young people away from crime and conflict.

Ali was leader of the Labour Group between 2009 and 2012. In May 2009, he was selected to lead the party in the 2010 local elections, becoming Labour's first Muslim leader. In May 2010, he led Labour to victory in the local council elections for Camden Council, defeating the borough's Liberal Democrats/Conservative coalition. Ali became leader of Camden Council from May 2010 until standing down in May 2012.

In March 2012, he announced he would be standing down as leader of Camden Council in May after his regeneration chief, Cllr Sarah Hayward, confirmed she would stand against him for the post at Labour's annual meeting in May. In March 2012, he became Cabinet Member for Young People.

In May 2022, Ali became Mayor of Camden for a second time.

== Community work ==
Since 2001, Ali has been the Executive Director of the King's Cross Brunswick Neighbourhood Association. He was also the Chair of the Healthy Families Partnership at King's Cross, Board member of the West Euston Partnership (WEP), Chair of the WEP Planning Working Group and on the executive board of the Community Empowerment Network. He also chaired the Camden Bangladesh Mela Committee.

He was the Cabinet Member for Community Safety following the London bombings on 7 July 2005. He was also an advisor to the Metropolitan Police Service and The Prince's Trust, and a Governor for Westminster Kingsway College. and school governor of South Camden Community School now known as Regent High School from 1998 to 2006 and Netley Primary School from 2006 to 2011.

Ali has worked with the British High Commissioner in Bangladesh to promote the interests of Bangladeshis who live in Camden or who wish to visit the UK. In 2007, Ali arranged a reception for Professor Muhammad Yunus to celebrate his award of the Nobel Peace Prize.

== Awards and recognition ==
In 1998, Ali was awarded one of the first Camden Good Citizen Awards for his work in diverting young people away from crime, drugs and conflict. He was appointed an Officer of the Order of the British Empire (OBE) in the 2011 New Year Honours for services to local government.

== Personal life ==
Since 1984, Ali has lived in Camden. At the time he first served as Mayor of Camden, he was married to Amanda Ali. He lives in Haverstock, London with his wife and three sons, Rio, Zach and Noah. Two of his sons were born in the Royal Free Hospital and one at home. As of May 2022, he is married to Lina Choudhury, who will be his Mayoress during his second term as Mayor of Camden.

Ali is a Muslim and a Liverpool Football Club fan.

== See also ==
- British Bangladeshi
- List of British Bangladeshis
- List of ethnic minority politicians in the United Kingdom

Civic offices
Preceded by Judith Pattison	Mayor of Camden; 14 May 2003 – 13 May 2004	Succeeded by Harriet Garland
