= Abdul Hai (UK politician) =

London politician

Abdul Hai OBE (born 1974 or 1975) is a former Labour member of the cabinet of Camden Council. He has a Bangladeshi Muslim family background. At age 19, he was acquitted of the murder of Richard Everitt, a white boy who was stabbed to death by a gang of Bengalis. He is currently a director at LabTech, a company that owns and manages real estate in Camden, including Camden Market.

== Murder charge, acquittal, and aftermath ==
On 13 August 1994, when Hai was 19 years old, Richard Everitt, a white boy from Somers Town, was stabbed to death by a gang of Bangladeshi boys, an act that provoked retaliatory attacks by whites against the area's Asian and Muslim populations. Many of the perpetrators of Everitt's killing fled to Bangladesh and were never brought to justice. Consequently, charges were only brought against three boys alleged to have been involved: Badrul Miah, Showat Akbar, and Abdul Hai. Hai was jailed for six weeks before trial in Feltham Young Offenders Institution, where he says he overheard other prisoners plotting to set fire to him with petrol.

At trial, Miah and Akbar were convicted (for murder and violent disorder, respectively), but Hai was acquitted at the direction of the judge, Mrs Justice Steel, who ruled that Hai had no case to answer. Hai has repeatedly said that he had no involvement whatsoever with the murder and was not present at the scene.

A note purportedly written by one of the jurors at the trial and later given to Badrul Miah's lawyers was presented at Miah's appeal against his murder conviction. According to the note, the majority of the jurors exhibited an "underlying prejudice of some description" towards the Bangladeshi boys before them and presumed their guilt, including Hai's, before any evidence was presented. The note claimed that the majority of the jury were convinced of Hai's guilt despite there being "absolutely no evidence to support this at all", and would have convicted him had the judge not directed them not to.

On his personal website, Hai writes that the "miscarriage of justice" he experienced left him "determined to make the world a better place", and that this is what motivated him to join the Labour Party.

According to The Guardian, Hai once successfully sued to pulp a book that had repeated claims against him, and has had to have Wikipedia content edited to make his innocence clear.

In August 2024, the thirtieth anniversary of the murder, far-right activist Tommy Robinson stated on X that Miah, Akbar, and Hai had been "convicted" of the killing. Hai reported the post on X, and wrote to Robinson stating he had been acquitted. Robinson deleted the post but reposted a screenshot of it, which Hai's lawyers reported and demanded that X delete. X deleted it on 6 September, a day before the demand's deadline.

Speaking to The Guardian after the deletion of Robinson's X post, Hai said X had not done enough to uphold its own policies. He said "Never in my wildest dreams did I think that this would continue for the rest of my life. That I just have to continue confronting this and justifying my innocence is something I find quite difficult to comprehend. Even though I was acquitted, I feel like I’ve been given a life sentence."

== Political career ==
Hai was elected to Camden Council in 2006 and became a member of its cabinet in 2010. He served in the cabinet until the 2021 elections, when he chose not to restand.

=== Work on ethnic issues ===
In 2017, Hai supported Camden Council's adoption of the IHRA definition of antisemitism. In 2019, he put forward a motion calling for the adoption of the definition of Islamophobia by the All-Party Parliamentary Group on British Muslims, which was carried.

In 2018, Hai joined calls for the resignation of Mary Hassell, the coroner for St Pancras Coroner's Court, whose jurisdiction includes Camden, saying she should move to an area with "fewer faith sensitivities". Hassell followed a "cab rank" policy of handling cases in the order they came in, saying it was unfair to prioritise cases where the deceased was Jewish or Muslim over those of other faiths. This led to opposition from faith leaders and politicians due to the obligation under Jewish and Muslim law to bury the dead as soon as possible. When the policy was struck down by the courts as unlawful later that year, Hai called it a "resounding victory for those who have campaigned for the coroner's service to be brought into the 21st Century".

In 2020, Hai was interviewed by Channel S, a UK-based TV channel aimed at Bangladeshis, to stress the importance of following the government's COVID-19 guidelines. He commented in a blog post that "Given the impact on the Bangladeshi community, it was important to reach out in ways that mainstream channels were unable to do".

In February 2021, Hai announced that Camden Council had set up a hate crime helpline in partnership with the charity Stop Hate UK.

On his website, Hai claims that he set up the (now-defunct) All-Party Parliamentary Group for sustainability in the curry industry.

=== Youth work ===
Hai was a youth worker prior to becoming a councillor, and from 2013-2017 was Director of Youth Services at King's Cross Brunswick Neighbourhood Association. As a councillor, he co-chaired the Camden Youth Safety Task Force along with Keir Starmer, the area's local MP. The taskforce developed the ENGAGE programme, which connects youth workers to under-18s in police custody to provide them with support and attempt to reduce reoffending.

In the 2022 Birthday Honours, he was appointed an Officer of the Order of the British Empire (OBE) "for services to Young People and to the community in Camden and London".

=== Call for removal from the cabinet ===
In 2019, Conservative council member Oliver Cooper unsuccessfully called for Hai to be removed from the cabinet. Hai had not attended any cabinet meetings for six months. Of four scheduled meetings in the period, two had been cancelled, one had clashed with a public meeting Hai was attending elsewhere, and another clashed with a personal commitment of Hai's. Cooper claimed that the Local Government Act 1972 required the removal of any cabinet member who had not attended meetings for six months, and that Hai therefore could not legally remain a member of the cabinet.

The council's lawyers disputed this interpretation of the law, and a statement by the council noted that the Act allows the discharge of executive duties by a cabinet member to count as attendance at meetings, and that Hai had been "extremely active ... discharging his role as a cabinet member" over the six month period. He was not removed from the cabinet.

=== Parliamentary ambitions ===
In 2019, Westminster Extra reported that Hai had been "tipped by his supporters to make a parliamentary run at some stage in the future", and in 2023, the Camden New Journal suggested he had "set his sights on" a Commons seat, citing alleged "whispers" that he would like to run if there was an opening in east London.

OPEN Newham described Hai as a "seemingly vacuous individual... with a penchant for overstating his own importance", but sarcastically suggested that he might nonetheless be "the chosen one" in West Ham and Beckton, in part due to his past connections to Starmer and to him being a Bengali (and the constituency having a significant Bengali population).

Political commentator Michael Crick, however, suggested Hai would be an "interesting" choice in light of the murder allegation against him in his youth. The Guardian reported that after he put himself up for selection, Hai was "flooded with abuse" on X, with "many" people claiming he was a convicted murderer.

Ultimately Hai was not selected and did not run in the 2024 general election.
