= Jonathan Black (art historian) =

British art historian

Jonathan Black (1966–2023) was a British art historian and writer.

== Biography ==
Born in Wilmslow, Cheshire, Black attended state schools before studying history at the University of Cambridge. After working in the wine trade, he pursued doctoral research in art history at University College London under David Bindman. In 2009, he became a research fellow in the history of art at Kingston University.

Black initially conducted research on Dora Gordine. He produced a catalogue of her work and was involved with the Dorich House Museum in London, which Gordine had designed. He also authored Winston Churchill in British Art, 1900 to the Present Day: The Titan With Many Faces (2017), analyzing Winston Churchill's evolving public image and its artistic representations. He also worked with galleries and museums on exhibitions covering topics such as vorticism, the Italian campaign in World War I, and the works of Alfred Munnings.

== Bibliography ==
- Winston Churchill in British Art, 1900 to the Present Day (2017)
