= Gospel Oak (ward) =

Electoral ward in the London borough of Camden

- Electoral ward for the Camden London Borough Council
- Gospel Oak ward boundaries since 2022
- Borough: Camden
- County: Greater London
- Population: 11,616 (2021) (Note: 2021 Census data reported for 2022 ward boundaries)
- Electorate: 8,788 (2022)
- Area: 0.7828 square kilometres (0.3022 sq mi)

Current electoral ward
- Created: 1965
- Number of members: 1965–2002: 2; 2002–present: 3
- Councillors: Richard Atkins; Marcus Boyland; Larraine Revah
- GSS code: E05013658 (2022–present)

Gospel Oak is a ward in the London Borough of Camden, in the United Kingdom. The ward has existed since the creation of the borough on 1 April 1965 and was first used in the 1964 elections. The ward was redrawn in May 1978, May 2002 and for the 2022 election. In the latter, parts of Hampstead Town ward were transferred to Gospel Oak. In 2018, the ward had an electorate of 8,978. The Boundary Commission projects the electorate to rise to 9,344 in 2025.

It was represented by future MP Tessa Jowell (LAB) from 1974 to 1986, businessman John Mills (LAB) from 1990 to 2006, Camden Council Leader Raj Chada (LAB) from 2002 to 2006 and future MP Chris Philp (CON) from 2006 to 2010.

== Camden council elections since 2022 ==
There was a revision of ward boundaries in Camden in 2022.

Key

* - Indicates an incumbent candidate
† - Indicates an incumbent candidate standing in a different ward

=== 2026 election ===
The election took place on 7 May 2026

Gospel Oak (3 seats)
Party	Candidate	Votes	%	±%
Green	Richard Atkins	1,240		
Labour	Marcus Boyland*	1,208		
Labour	Larraine Revah*	1,192		
Green	Andrea Paramananthan	1,165		
Green	Rob Reeves	1,137		
Labour	Matthew Sudlow	1,100		
Reform	Alan Drummond	444		
Reform	Lindsey Mitchell	425		
Reform	David Moore	420		
Liberal Democrats	Margaret Jackson-Roberts	360		
Liberal Democrats	James Bowen	350		
Conservative	Peter Straker	343		
Conservative	Raphaël Link-Gurprasad	319		
Conservative	Saed Mohamed	279		
Liberal Democrats	Sunil Hiranandani	247		
Turnout			39.18	+5.68
Green gain from Labour		Swing		
Labour hold		Swing		
Labour hold		Swing		

=== 2022 election ===
The election took place on 5 May 2022.

2022 Camden London Borough Council election: Gospel Oak
Party	Candidate	Votes	%	±%
Labour	Jenny Mulholland	1,927	65.5	
Labour	Marcus Boyland	1,880	63.9	
Labour	Larraine Revah	1,860	63.2	
Liberal Democrats	Margaret Jackson-Roberts	492	16.7	
Conservative	Jah-Love Charles	466	15.8	
Liberal Democrats	Laura Noel	460	15.6	
Conservative	Nigel Rumble	449	15.3	
Conservative	Esmeralda Akpoke	434	14.7	
Liberal Democrats	David Simmons	354	12.0	
Independent	Chrislyn Pict	89	3.0	
Turnout		2,944	33.5	
Labour win (new boundaries)				
Labour win (new boundaries)				
Labour win (new boundaries)				

== 2002–2022 Camden council elections ==
Gospel Oak ward boundaries from 2002 to 2022

There was a revision of ward boundaries in Camden in 2002. Councillors representing Gospel Oak increased from two to three.

=== 2018 election ===
The election took place on 3 May 2018.

2018 Camden London Borough Council election: Gospel Oak
Party	Candidate	Votes	%	±%
Labour	Jenny Mulholland *	1,502	52.6	+0.9
Labour	Marcus Boyland *	1,442	50.5	+1.7
Labour	Larraine Revah *	1,361	47.6	+0.5
Liberal Democrats	Judy Dixey	759	26.6	+19.0
Liberal Democrats	Stephen Crosher	739	25.9	+18.4
Liberal Democrats	Matthew Jonathan Kirk	603	21.1	+16.3
Green	Jane Walby	412	14.4	−2.4
Conservative	Will Blair	411	14.4	−5.0
Conservative	Cathleen Mainds	399	14.0	−2.9
Conservative	John Webber	350	12.3	−1.7
Green	Dominic Kendrick	292	10.2	−6.0
Turnout			36.63	
Labour hold		Swing		
Labour hold		Swing		
Labour hold		Swing		

=== 2014 election ===
The election took place on 22 May 2014.

2014 Camden London Borough Council election: Gospel Oak
Party	Candidate	Votes	%	±%
Labour	Theo Blackwell*	1,687	51.7	+13.1
Labour	Maeve McCormack*	1,590	48.8	+9.2
Labour	Larraine Revah*	1,534	47.1	+11.2
Conservative	Steve Adams	634	19.4	−6.2
Conservative	Peter Horne	551	16.9	−9.5
Green	Jane Walby	549	16.8	+5.1
Green	Constantin Buhayer	527	16.2	+4.4
Conservative	Sangita Singh	456	14.0	−13.9
Green	James Marshall	429	13.2	+2.4
UKIP	Barry Leavers	361	11.1	N/A
Liberal Democrats	Roger Hughes	248	7.6	−14.2
Liberal Democrats	Laura Frances Noel	245	7.5	−12.3
Liberal Democrats	Kevin Simon Sefton	158	4.8	−12.1
TUSC	John Reid	110	3.4	N/A
Turnout				
Labour hold		Swing		
Labour hold		Swing		
Labour hold		Swing		

=== 2010 election ===
The election on 6 May 2010 took place on the same day as the United Kingdom general election.

2010 Camden London Borough Council election: Gospel Oak
Party	Candidate	Votes	%	±%
Labour	Sean Birch	2,015	39.6	+4.6
Labour	Theo Blackwell	1,965	38.6	+3.7
Labour	Larraine Revah	1,825	35.9	+3.0
Conservative	Lulu Mitchell *	1,421	27.9	−11.5
Conservative	Keith Sedgwick *	1,344	26.4	−10.7
Conservative	Steve Adams	1,305	25.6	−12.5
Liberal Democrats	Margaret Jackson-Roberts	1,107	21.8	+7.0
Liberal Democrats	Laura Noel	1,006	19.8	+6.6
Liberal Democrats	Simon Horvat-Marcovic	860	16.9	+6.2
Green	Robin Smith	602	11.8	−0.4
Green	Jane Walby	595	11.7	−0.1
Green	Constantin Buhayer	548	10.8	+1.2
Turnout		5,089	63.0	+17.1
Labour gain from Conservative		Swing		
Labour gain from Conservative		Swing		
Labour gain from Conservative		Swing		

=== 2006 election ===
The election took place on 4 May 2006.

2006 Camden London Borough Council election: Gospel Oak
Party	Candidate	Votes	%	±%
Conservative	Lulu Mitchell	1,378	39.4	+13.8
Conservative	Chris Philp	1,333	38.1	+15.6
Conservative	Keith Sedgwick	1,297	37.1	+15.7
Labour	Sally Gimson	1,225	35.0	−1.8
Labour	Raj Chada *	1,220	34.9	−4.5
Labour	Janet Guthrie *	1,150	32.9	−8.0
Liberal Democrats	Margaret Jackson-Roberts	519	14.8	−5.2
Liberal Democrats	Laura Noel	461	13.2	−2.9
Green	Josephine Karen	428	12.2	−1.3
Green	Jane Walby	411	11.8	−2.7
Liberal Democrats	Herbert Newbrook	373	10.7	−4.9
Green	Richard Thomas	337	9.6	−2.7
Turnout		10,132	45.9	
Conservative gain from Labour		Swing		
Conservative gain from Labour		Swing		
Conservative gain from Labour		Swing		

=== 2002 election ===
The election took place on 2 May 2002.

2002 Camden London Borough Council election: Gospel Oak
Party	Candidate	Votes	%	±%
Labour	Janet Guthrie	880	40.9	
Labour	Raj Chada	846	39.4	
Labour	John Mills	791	36.8	
Conservative	Lindsay Mitchell	550	25.6	
Conservative	Richard Millett	506	23.5	
Conservative	Carole Ricketts	459	21.4	
Liberal Democrats	Margaret Jackson-Roberts	430	20.0	
Liberal Democrats	Peter Mair	347	16.1	
Liberal Democrats	Jeffrey Poulter	336	15.6	
Green	Jane Walby	311	14.5	
Green	Howard Edmunds	291	13.5	
Green	Lesley Robb	264	12.3	
CPA	Humberto Heliotrope	50	2.3	
Turnout		6,076		

== 1978–2002 Camden council elections ==
There was a revision of ward boundaries in Camden in 1978.

=== 1998 election ===
The election took place on 7 May 1998.

1998 Camden London Borough Council election: Gospel Oak
Party	Candidate	Votes	%	±%
Labour	John A.D. Mills*	760	52.76	▼3.17
Labour	Judith E. Pattison^{†} (Note: Pattison was a sitting councillor representing the Belsize ward.)	719		
Liberal Democrats	Margaret A. Jackson-Roberts	336	22.01	▲6.13
Liberal Democrats	Jeffrey R. Poulter	281		
Conservative	Marian Harrison	221	14.31	▼2.79
Conservative	Henry Whittaker	180		
Green	Debra J. Green	153	10.92	▼0.17
Registered electors		4,464		▲167
Turnout		1,499	33.58	▼6.47
Rejected ballots		14	0.93	▲0.70
Labour hold				
Labour hold				

=== 1994 election ===
The election took place on 5 May 1994.

1994 Camden London Borough Council election: Gospel Oak
Party	Candidate	Votes	%	±%
Labour	Robert E. Hall	1,078	55.93	▼5.64
Labour Co-op	John A.D. Mills*	838		
Conservative	Iris Coney	313	17.10	▼4.47
Liberal Democrats	Margaret A. Jackson-Roberts	289	15.88	New
Conservative	Michael E. H. Ost	273		
Liberal Democrats	Frances de Freitas	255		
Green	Sheila M. Oakes	190	11.09	▼5.77
Registered electors		4,297		▼179
Turnout		1,721	40.05	▼8.05
Rejected ballots		4	0.23	Steady
Labour hold				
Labour Co-op hold				

=== 1990 election ===
The election took place on 3 May 1990.

1990 Camden London Borough Council election: Gospel Oak
Party	Candidate	Votes	%
Labour	Winifred V. Parsons	1,345	61.57
Labour	John A.D. Mills	1,269	
Conservative	Giselle V. Harrison	467	21.57
Conservative	Maura E. Lyons	448	
Green	Lynda Dagley	358	16.86
Registered electors		4,476	
Turnout		2153	48.10
Rejected ballots		5	0.23
Labour hold			
Labour hold			

=== 1986 election ===
The election took place on 8 May 1986.

1986 Camden London Borough Council election: Gospel Oak
Party	Candidate	Votes	%	±%
Labour	Rose Head	1,455		
Labour	Graham Shurety	1,429		
Conservative	John Livingston	410		
Conservative	Peter Somerville	372		
Alliance	David Birkett	283		
Alliance	Patricia Gros	279		
Turnout				
Labour hold		Swing		
Labour hold		Swing		

=== 1982 election ===
The election took place on 6 May 1982.

1982 Camden London Borough Council election: Gospel Oak
Party	Candidate	Votes	%	±%
Labour	Ronald Hefferman	1,167		
Labour	Tessa Jowell	1,075		
Alliance	Philip Fitzpatrick	543		
Alliance	Margaret Jackson-Roberts	538		
Conservative	Clifford Edwards	389		
Conservative	Paul Brandt	363		
Save London Action Group	Sasthi Chakravarti	76		
Independent	David James	62		
Turnout				
Labour hold		Swing		
Labour hold		Swing		

=== 1978 election ===
The election took place on 4 May 1978.

1978 Camden London Borough Council election: Gospel Oak
Party	Candidate	Votes	%	±%
Labour	Ronald Hefferman	1,125		
Labour	Tessa Jowell	1,059		
Conservative	Peter Barber	546		
Conservative	Anthony Earl-Williams	523		
Communist	Kenneth Herbert	102		
Turnout				
Labour win (new seat)				
Labour win (new seat)				

== 1971–1978 Camden council elections ==
There was a revision of ward boundaries in Camden in 1971.

=== 1974 election ===
The election took place on 2 May 1974.

1974 Camden London Borough Council election: Gospel Oak
Party	Candidate	Votes	%	±%
Labour	Tessa Jowell	1,072	65.4	
Labour	Brian Loughran	1,033		
Conservative	Denis Friis	376	23.0	
Conservative	Robert Targett	347		
Liberal	A Lawrie	115	7.0	
Communist	Henry Martin	75	4.6	
Turnout			42.3	
Labour hold		Swing		
Labour hold		Swing		

=== 1971 election ===
The election took place on 13 May 1971.

1971 Camden London Borough Council election: Gospel Oak
Party	Candidate	Votes	%	±%
Labour	John Keohane	1,137	47.4	
Labour	Brian Loughran	1,112		
Conservative	Kenneth Graham	475	27.9	
Conservative	John Macdonald	471		
Communist	Ken Herbert	90	5.3	
Turnout			46.5	
Labour gain from Conservative		Swing		
Labour hold		Swing		

== 1964–1971 Camden council elections ==
External image
- Gospel Oak ward boundaries from 1965 to 1971

=== 1968 election ===
The election took place on 9 May 1968.

1968 Camden London Borough Council election: Gospel Oak
Party	Candidate	Votes	%	±%
Conservative	Malcolm Heath	888	47.4	
Labour	Charles Tate	861	47.1	
Labour	John Keohane	837		
Conservative	James Surrey	820		
Liberal	Alfred Cook	199	5.5	
Turnout			36.4	
Conservative gain from Labour		Swing		
Labour hold		Swing		

=== 1964 election ===
The election took place on 7 May 1964.

1964 Camden London Borough Council election: Gospel Oak
Party	Candidate	Votes	%	±%
Labour	Alexander Sullivan	1,257		
Labour	Charles Tate	1,212		
Conservative	Anthony Dey	560		
Conservative	Denis Friis	557		
Communist	Kenneth Herbert	130		
Turnout		1,905	34.5	
Labour win (new seat)				
Labour win (new seat)				
