= 1968 Camden London Borough Council election =

1968 local election in England

1968 Camden Council election
← 1964	9 May 1968	1971 →

All 60 seats to Camden London Borough Council 31 seats needed for a majority
- Turnout: 34.8%

	First party	Second party	Third party
Leader	Geoffrey Finsberg	Charlie Ratchford	Fred Cook
Party	Conservative	Labour	Liberal
Leader's seat	Hampstead Central	Grafton	None (defeated in Gospel Oak)
Last election	26	34	0
Seats won	42	18	0
Seat change	▲16	▼16	Steady
Percentage	54.9%	38.5%	5.5%
Leader before election
Charlie Ratchford
Labour
Leader
Geoffrey Finsberg
Conservative

The 1968 Camden Council election took place on 9 May 1968 to elect members of Camden London Borough Council in London, England. The whole council was up for election and the Conservative Party gained overall control of the council.

== Ward results ==
=== Adelaide ===
Adelaide (4)
Party	Candidate	Votes	%	±%
Conservative	Julian Tobin	2,470	62.9	
Conservative	Brenda Hennessey	2,434		
Conservative	Madeleine Dumont	2,426		
Conservative	Frederick Tuckman	2,400		
Labour	Janet Whitaker	1,120	26.6	
Labour	Sheila Oakes	1,035		
Labour	Thomas Borrows	990		
Labour	Mark Bass	976		
Liberal	Bernard Cohen	391	9.2	
Liberal	Douglas Close	357		
Liberal	P. C. Hemelryk	337		
Liberal	J. M. Flatman	334		
Communist	Jack Gaster	197	1.3	
Turnout			38.3	
Conservative hold		Swing		
Conservative hold		Swing		
Conservative hold		Swing		
Conservative hold		Swing		

=== Belsize ===
Belsize (4)
Party	Candidate	Votes	%	±%
Conservative	Kenneth Evans	2,355	56.9	
Conservative	Irene Burnett	2,346		
Conservative	Norman Oatway	2,345		
Conservative	Julian Harrison	2,328		
Labour	Edwin Lichtenstein	1,330	31.8	
Labour	Joseph Hughes	1,322		
Labour	William Kellock	1,308		
Labour	Arthur Soutter	1,279		
Liberal	Tristram Adams	488	11.3	
Liberal	Margaret Darvall	472		
Liberal	Angela Whitelegge	448		
Liberal	Gerald Dowden	445		
Turnout			37.6	
Conservative hold		Swing		
Conservative hold		Swing		
Conservative hold		Swing		
Conservative hold		Swing		

=== Bloomsbury ===
Bloomsbury (3)
Party	Candidate	Votes	%	±%
Conservative	Harold Gould	1,440	73.3	
Conservative	Sidney Jaque	1,440		
Conservative	Colin Jaque	1,439		
Labour	David Carlton	530	26.7	
Labour	Keith Morrell	522		
Labour	Eileen O'Connor	522		
Turnout			29.6	
Conservative hold		Swing		
Conservative hold		Swing		
Conservative hold		Swing		

=== Camden ===
Camden (4)
Party	Candidate	Votes	%	±%
Labour	James Buckland	1,616	50.4	
Labour	Philip Hughes	1,613		
Labour	Ivor Walker	1,550		
Conservative	Leslie Langford	1,518	46.2	
Labour	Peter Plouviez	1,513		
Conservative	Anthony Mayer	1,434		
Conservative	Olive Staples	1,417		
Conservative	Monia Rynderman	1,404		
Communist	Jock Nicholson	266	2.1	
Independent	Frederick Britt	155	1.3	
Turnout			30.1	
Labour hold		Swing		
Labour hold		Swing		
Labour hold		Swing		
Conservative gain from Labour		Swing		

=== Chalk Farm ===
Chalk Farm (2)
Party	Candidate	Votes	%	±%
Conservative	Peter J. Molony	1,109	54.6	
Conservative	George Radford	1,019		
Labour	Edwin Rhodes	818	40.1	
Labour	John Sell	748		
Liberal	Guy Rayne-Savagr	207	5.3	
Turnout			32.3	
Conservative gain from Labour		Swing		
Conservative gain from Labour		Swing		

=== Euston ===
Euston (2)
Party	Candidate	Votes	%	±%
Conservative	Nigel Burton	660	51.6	
Conservative	Horace Shooter	638		
Labour	Christopher Kiddy	539	42.5	
Labour	Richard Madeley	530		
Liberal	Roger Brooke	147	5.8	
Turnout			30.2	
Conservative gain from Labour		Swing		
Conservative gain from Labour		Swing		

=== Gospel Oak ===
Gospel Oak (2)
Party	Candidate	Votes	%	±%
Conservative	Malcolm Heath	888	47.4	
Labour	Charles Tate	861	47.1	
Labour	John Keohane	837		
Conservative	James Surrey	820		
Liberal	Alfred Cook	199	5.5	
Turnout			36.4	
Conservative gain from Labour		Swing		
Labour hold		Swing		

=== Grafton ===
Grafton (4)
Party	Candidate	Votes	%	±%
Labour	Charles Ratchford	1,574	54.5	
Labour	Joseph Richardson	1,483		
Labour	Roy Shaw	1,462		
Labour	Albert (Jock) Stallard	1,411		
Conservative	Brian Sommerville	1,200	43.7	
Conservative	Michael Gromm	1,192		
Conservative	Muriel Hanscomb	1,189		
Conservative	Elizabeth Ray	1,169		
Communist	Victor Heath	200	1.8	
Turnout			26.3	
Labour hold		Swing		
Labour hold		Swing		
Labour hold		Swing		
Labour hold		Swing		

=== Hampstead Central ===
Hampstead Central (3)
Party	Candidate	Votes	%	±%
Conservative	Geoffrey Finsberg	1,965	64.2	
Conservative	Sidney Torrance	1,937		
Conservative	Ronald King	1,909		
Labour	Peter Stephenson	764	24.6	
Labour	Barry Peskin	740		
Labour	James Hill	724		
Liberal	Kenneth Carter	344	11.2	
Liberal	Alison Snow	343		
Liberal	Jillian Vasey	328		
Turnout			34.2	
Conservative hold		Swing		
Conservative hold		Swing		
Conservative hold		Swing		

=== Hampstead Town ===
Hampstead Town (3)
Party	Candidate	Votes	%	±%
Conservative	Elizabeth Knight	2,191	57.9	
Conservative	Arthur Roome	2,162		
Conservative	Peter Smith	2,119		
Labour	Anthony Clarke	987	25.9	
Labour	Jennifer Keohane	958		
Labour	Phyllis Hymans	946		
Liberal	Archie MacDonald	587	14.4	
Liberal	George Willett	532		
Liberal	Sarah Khuner	491		
Communist	Betty Tate	200	1.8	
Turnout			40.6	
Conservative hold		Swing		
Conservative hold		Swing		
Conservative hold		Swing		

=== Highgate ===
Highgate (3)
Party	Candidate	Votes	%	±%
Conservative	Peter Brooke	2,185	59.4	
Conservative	Ronald Walker	2,165		
Conservative	Denis Friis	2,119		
Labour	Peter Jonas	1,275	35.1	
Labour	John Palmer	1,274		
Labour	Florence Freeman	1,272		
Liberal	Joyce Arram	216	3.9	
Liberal	Richard Franklin	207		
Communist	Winston Pinder	174	1.6	
Turnout			47.9	
Conservative hold		Swing		
Conservative hold		Swing		
Conservative hold		Swing		

=== Holborn ===
Holborn (3)
Party	Candidate	Votes	%	±%
Conservative	Kenneth Avery	2,096	74.5	
Conservative	John Barker	2,094		
Conservative	Alan Greengross	2,071		
Labour	Patricia Carlton	728	25.5	
Labour	Betty Grass	706		
Labour	Margaret Davis	705		
Turnout			34.4	
Conservative hold		Swing		
Conservative hold		Swing		
Conservative hold		Swing		

=== Kilburn ===
Kilburn (3)
Party	Candidate	Votes	%	±%
Labour	Robert Humphreys	1,420	49.5	
Labour	Albert (Tim) Skinner	1,388		
Labour	Edwin (Johnny) Johnson	1,373		
Conservative	Kenneth Graham	1,245	43.7	
Conservative	Harriet Greenaway	1,238		
Conservative	James Lemkin	1,210		
Liberal	Colin Brown	166	5.6	
Liberal	Bickram Bhose	158		
Liberal	Dawson France	147		
Communist	Stella McEntire	103	1.2	
Turnout			36.6	
Labour hold		Swing		
Labour hold		Swing		
Labour hold		Swing		

=== King's Cross ===
King's Cross (3)
Party	Candidate	Votes	%	±%
Conservative	John Glendinning	1,689	60.5	
Conservative	Ian Clarke	1,680		
Conservative	Thomas Morris	1,672		
Labour	Beverley Rowe	1,106	39.5	
Labour	John Diamond	1,096		
Labour	Louis Bondy	1,083		
Turnout			32.0	
Conservative gain from Labour		Swing		
Conservative gain from Labour		Swing		
Conservative gain from Labour		Swing		

=== Priory ===
Priory (4)
Party	Candidate	Votes	%	±%
Conservative	Irene Ellis	2,005	47.0	
Conservative	Philippa Raymond-Cox	2,003		
Conservative	Ronald Raymond-Cox	1,994		
Conservative	Peter Hilton	1,972		
Labour	Jack Cooper	1,838	42.0	
Labour	Leila Campbell	1,827		
Labour	John St. John	1,774		
Labour	Enid Wistrich	1,689		
Liberal	David Quirke	417	9.6	
Liberal	Kenneth Whittle	411		
Liberal	Robert Pellegrinetti	405		
Liberal	Peter Rowntree	391		
Communist	Barbara Champion	228	1.3	
Turnout			40.4	
Conservative gain from Labour		Swing		
Conservative gain from Labour		Swing		
Conservative gain from Labour		Swing		
Conservative gain from Labour		Swing		

=== Regent's Park ===
Regent's Park (3)
Party	Candidate	Votes	%	±%
Conservative	Ernest Lee	1,696	51.0	
Conservative	Dorothy Day	1,681		
Conservative	Christopher Turner	1,670		
Labour	Richard Collins	1,523	44.9	
Labour	James Greenwood	1,489		
Labour	John Mills	1,433		
National Front	Raymond Shenton	231	2.3	
Communist	Aileen Boatman	176	1.8	
Turnout			37.6	
Conservative gain from Labour		Swing		
Conservative gain from Labour		Swing		
Conservative gain from Labour		Swing		

=== St John's ===
St John's (3)
Party	Candidate	Votes	%	±%
Labour	Roger Robinson	1,367	55.9	
Labour	Corin Hughes-Stanton	1,248		
Labour	Ruth Howe	1,217		
Conservative	Anthony Blackburn	1,038	44.1	
Conservative	Martin Piper	999		
Conservative	Richard Smith	983		
Turnout			36.5	
Labour hold		Swing		
Labour hold		Swing		
Labour hold		Swing		

=== St Pancras ===
St Pancras (4)
Party	Candidate	Votes	%	±%
Labour	Paddy O'Connor	1,327	60.1	
Labour	Samuel Fisher	1,318		
Labour	Peter Best	1,304		
Labour	William Oakshott	1,293		
Conservative	Anthony Crofts	764	34.5	
Conservative	A. MacWillson	752		
Conservative	Robert Medcraft	747		
Conservative	Malcolm Deacon	743		
Liberal	Jean Morgan	180	4.0	
Liberal	Ray Benad	169		
Communist	David Guppy	119	1.4	
Turnout			26.1	
Labour hold		Swing		
Labour hold		Swing		
Labour hold		Swing		
Labour hold		Swing		

=== West End ===
West End (3)
Party	Candidate	Votes	%	±%
Conservative	Victor Lyon	1,939	61.3	
Conservative	Susan Ayliff	1,935		
Conservative	Christine Stewart-Munro	1,897		
Labour	Phil Turner	957	30.4	
Labour	Michael Cendrowicz	955		
Labour	Grace Stevenson	948		
Liberal	Nigel Barnes	286	8.3	
Liberal	Dorothy Willett	266		
Liberal	Hans Kuhner	232		
Turnout			33.0	
Conservative hold		Swing		
Conservative hold		Swing		
Conservative hold		Swing		
