= 1964 Camden London Borough Council election =

1964 local election in England

1964 Camden Council election
7 May 1964	1968 →

All 60 seats to Camden London Borough Council 31 seats needed for a majority
- Turnout: 35.6%

	First party	Second party	Third party
Party	Labour	Conservative	Liberal
Seats won	34	26	0
Leader
Charlie Ratchford
Labour

The 1964 Camden Council election took place on 7 May 1964 to elect members of Camden London Borough Council in London, England. The whole council was up for election and the Labour Party gained control of the council.

== Background ==
These elections were the first to the newly formed borough. Previously elections had taken place in the Metropolitan Borough of Hampstead, Metropolitan Borough of Holborn and Metropolitan Borough of St Pancras. These boroughs were joined to form the new London Borough of Camden by the London Government Act 1963.

A total of 169 candidates stood in the election for the 60 seats being contested across 19 wards. These included a full slate from the Conservative and Labour parties, while the Liberals stood 31 candidates. Other candidates included 14 from the Communist party, 2 Independents and 2 Independent Labour. There were 10 three-seat wards, 6 four-seat wards and 3 two-seat wards.

This election had aldermen as well as directly elected councillors. Labour got 8 aldermen and the Conservatives 2.

The Council was elected in 1964 as a "shadow authority" but did not start operations until 1 April 1965.

== Election result ==
The results saw Labour gain the new council with a majority of 8 after winning 34 of the 60 seats. Overall turnout in the election was 35.6%. This turnout included 1,347 postal votes.

== Ward results ==
=== Adelaide ===
Adelaide (4)
Party	Candidate	Votes	%	±%
Conservative	Madeleine du Mont	2,152		
Conservative	Richard Butterfield	2,134		
Conservative	Julian Tobin	2,131		
Conservative	Howard Sugden	2,123		
Labour	William Page	1,399		
Labour	Margaret Maxwell	1,398		
Labour	Michael Read	1,384		
Labour	Thomas Sargant	1,329		
Liberal	Richard Michael Norton	375		
Liberal	Graham Knight	364		
Liberal	Nigel Seymer	362		
Liberal	Barbara Bridger	349		
Communist	Ernest Woods	152		
Turnout		3,973	35.5	
Conservative win (new seat)				
Conservative win (new seat)				
Conservative win (new seat)				
Conservative win (new seat)				

=== Belsize ===
Belsize (4)
Party	Candidate	Votes	%	±%
Conservative	Norman Oatway	2,045		
Conservative	Stanley Duncan	2,028		
Conservative	Alexandrina Burnett	2,015		
Conservative	Leslie Room	2,009		
Labour	Lyndal Evans	1,651		
Labour	Sheila Oakes	1,649		
Labour	Bernard Taylor	1,616		
Labour	Arthur Soutter	1,585		
Liberal	Margaret Darvall	585		
Liberal	Percy Brian Anderson	575		
Liberal	G. H. Willett	571		
Liberal	Doris Watson	564		
Communist	Timothy Webb	146		
Turnout		4,311	39.6	
Conservative win (new seat)				
Conservative win (new seat)				
Conservative win (new seat)				
Conservative win (new seat)				

=== Bloomsbury ===
Bloomsbury (3)
Party	Candidate	Votes	%	±%
Conservative	Harold Gould	1,390		
Conservative	William Ridd	1,386		
Conservative	Sidney Jaque	1,383		
Labour	Gyuri Wagner	1,118		
Labour	Frank Dobson	1,110		
Labour	Irene Wagner	1,097		
Turnout		2,544	32.2	
Conservative win (new seat)				
Conservative win (new seat)				
Conservative win (new seat)				

=== Camden ===
Camden (4)
Party	Candidate	Votes	%	±%
Labour	Tom Barker	2,279		
Labour	James Buckland	2,267		
Labour	Peggy Duff	2,203		
Labour	Peter Jonas	2,154		
Conservative	Beatrice Bundock	799		
Conservative	Frederick Hayward	738		
Conservative	Elizabeth Love	736		
Conservative	Amy Kinder	721		
Liberal	Joyce Arram	252		
Liberal	Jock Nicolson	238		
Liberal	Jessie Fleming	233		
Liberal	Anne Roberts	198		
Communist	Dorothy Willett	198		
Communist	Margaret Rockall	151		
Turnout		3,378	29.5	
Labour win (new seat)				
Labour win (new seat)				
Labour win (new seat)				
Labour win (new seat)				

=== Chalk Farm ===
Chalk Farm (2)
Party	Candidate	Votes	%	±%
Labour	Hilda Chandler	1,082		
Labour	Joseph Richardson	1,055		
Conservative	Anthony Boosey	775		
Conservative	Patricia Hayward	771		
Communist	Walter Rees	108		
Turnout		1,941	32.1	
Labour win (new seat)				
Labour win (new seat)				

=== Euston ===
Euston (2)
Party	Candidate	Votes	%	±%
Labour	Millie Miller	738		
Labour	Peter Best	730		
Conservative	Edward Bowman	677		
Conservative	Horace Shooter	649		
Turnout		1,433	29.5	
Labour win (new seat)				
Labour win (new seat)				

=== Gospel Oak ===
Gospel Oak (2)
Party	Candidate	Votes	%	±%
Labour	Alexander Sullivan	1,257		
Labour	Charles Tate	1,212		
Conservative	Anthony Dey	560		
Conservative	Denis Friis	557		
Communist	Kenneth Herbert	130		
Turnout		1,905	34.5	
Labour win (new seat)				
Labour win (new seat)				

=== Grafton ===
Grafton (4)
Party	Candidate	Votes	%	±%
Labour	Charles Ratchford	2,777		
Labour	Albert (Jock) Stallard	2,685		
Labour	Roy Shaw	2,671		
Labour	Derick Annison	2,621		
Conservative	Daphne Green	710		
Conservative	Christina Brennan	625		
Conservative	Esther Purves	621		
Conservative	George Paulley	604		
Communist	Donald Cook	323		
Communist	Harry Jackson	257		
Turnout		3,547	28.9	
Labour win (new seat)				
Labour win (new seat)				
Labour win (new seat)				
Labour win (new seat)				

=== Hampstead Central ===
Hampstead Central (3)
Party	Candidate	Votes	%	±%
Conservative	William Evans	1,596		
Conservative	Sidney Torrance	1,594		
Conservative	Geoffrey Finsberg	1,577		
Labour	Nancy Silverman	928		
Labour	Henry Totten	911		
Labour	Phil Turner	872		
Liberal	Michael Watson	382		
Liberal	Mary Barling	380		
Liberal	David Sacker	374		
Turnout		2,887	35.3	
Conservative win (new seat)				
Conservative win (new seat)				
Conservative win (new seat)				

=== Hampstead Town ===
Hampstead Town (3)
Party	Candidate	Votes	%	±%
Conservative	Elizabeth Knight	1,961		
Conservative	Arthur Roome	1,955		
Conservative	Luigi Denza	1,947		
Labour	Joan Hymans	1,146		
Labour	Thomas Mahoney	1,127		
Labour	Janek Langer	1,121		
Liberal	Pamela Frankau	694		
Liberal	Sarah Khuner	668		
Liberal	Archibald Macdonald	656		
Turnout		3,783	43.8	
Conservative win (new seat)				
Conservative win (new seat)				
Conservative win (new seat)				

=== Highgate ===
Highgate (3)
Party	Candidate	Votes	%	±%
Conservative	Martin Morton	2,067		
Conservative	William Brennan	2,062		
Conservative	Roland Walker	2,054		
Labour	Corin Hughes-Stanton	1,465		
Labour	Richard Andrews	1,440		
Labour	Ivy Tate	1,380		
Communist	Walter Davis	276		
Turnout		3,622	47.0	
Conservative win (new seat)				
Conservative win (new seat)				
Conservative win (new seat)				

=== Holborn ===
Holborn (3)
Party	Candidate	Votes	%	±%
Conservative	Albert Shaw	2,063		
Conservative	Alan Greengross	2,060		
Conservative	John Barker	2,040		
Labour	Iris Bonham	1,662		
Labour	Betty Grass	1,642		
Labour	Ruth Howe	1,613		
Liberal	James Hamilton	188		
Liberal	Joan Morris	174		
Liberal	Yvonne Taylor	162		
Turnout		3,944	42.2	
Conservative win (new seat)				
Conservative win (new seat)				
Conservative win (new seat)				

=== Kilburn ===
Kilburn (3)
Party	Candidate	Votes	%	±%
Labour	Victor Bonafont	1,813		
Labour	Albert (Tim) Skinner	1,768		
Labour	Robert Humphreys	1,763		
Conservative	Angus Macdonald	653		
Conservative	Pamela King	644		
Conservative	Winifred Peard	633		
Liberal	Nigel Barnes	171		
Liberal	Gwendoline Martin	165		
Liberal	Ronald Sampson	164		
Communist	Estella McEntire	71		
Turnout		2,676	31.6	
Labour win (new seat)				
Labour win (new seat)				
Labour win (new seat)				

=== King's Cross ===
King's Cross (3)
Party	Candidate	Votes	%	±%
Labour	Clifford Tucker	1,876		
Labour	John Diamond	1,857		
Labour	Arthur Graves	1,810		
Conservative	Joyce Burgess	1,523		
Conservative	William McGowan	1,492		
Conservative	Thomas Morris	1,473		
Turnout		3,410	36.0	
Labour win (new seat)				
Labour win (new seat)				
Labour win (new seat)				

=== Priory ===
Priory (4)
Party	Candidate	Votes	%	±%
Labour	Leila Campbell	2,147		
Labour	Jack Cooper	2,116		
Labour	John St. John	2,098		
Labour	Enid Wistrich	2,011		
Conservative	Irene Ellis	1,557		
Conservative	Anthony Pickford	1,557		
Conservative	Joan Dunsford	1,553		
Conservative	Charles Power	1,545		
Liberal	Arthur Stitt	322		
Liberal	Mary De la Mahotiere	319		
Liberal	David Harris	319		
Liberal	Bonamy Bradby	301		
Communist	Frederick Hill	159		
Turnout		4,062	37.7	
Labour win (new seat)				
Labour win (new seat)				
Labour win (new seat)				
Labour win (new seat)				

=== Regent's Park ===
Regent's Park (3)
Party	Candidate	Votes	%	±%
Labour	Richard Collins	2,299		
Labour	James Greenwood	2,298		
Labour	Grace Lee	2,260		
Conservative	Harold Bright	1,319		
Conservative	Keith Chalkley	1,316		
Conservative	Margaret Saville	1,300		
Communist	Colin Boatman	189		
Turnout		3,744	40.3	
Labour win (new seat)				
Labour win (new seat)				
Labour win (new seat)				

=== St John's ===
St John's (3)
Party	Candidate	Votes	%	±%
Labour	Roger Robinson	1,601		
Labour	Gillian Macfarlane	1,554		
Labour	Richard Rowe	1,538		
Conservative	George Hathway	605		
Conservative	Betty Gall	592		
Conservative	Ann Smith	590		
Communist	Peter Richards	188		
Turnout		2,270	31.0	
Labour win (new seat)				
Labour win (new seat)				
Labour win (new seat)				

=== St Pancras ===
St Pancras (4)
Party	Candidate	Votes	%	±%
Labour	William Oakshott	2,113		
Labour	Paddy O'Connor	2,111		
Labour	Sidney Munn	2,081		
Labour	Samuel Fisher	2,076		
Conservative	John Glendinning	495		
Conservative	Eileen Wright	476		
Conservative	Henry Salter	475		
Conservative	Josephine Robins	473		
Independent Labour	Thomas Linehan	291		
Independent Labour	Margaret Munro	224		
Independent	Malcolm Davies	184		
Independent	John Mandeville	154		
Turnout		2,876	29.9	
Labour win (new seat)				
Labour win (new seat)				
Labour win (new seat)				
Labour win (new seat)				

=== West End ===
West End (3)
Party	Candidate	Votes	%	±%
Conservative	Victor Lyon	1,686		
Conservative	Lindsay Cullen	1,684		
Conservative	Susan Ayliff	1,651		
Labour	Grace Stevenson	1,536		
Labour	Michael Cendrowicz	1,494		
Labour	Ernest Wistrich	1,482		
Liberal	Robert Druiff	372		
Liberal	Felix Kraft	372		
Liberal	Eric Abrahams	351		
Communist	Terrance Thomas	125		
Turnout		3,626	37.6	
Conservative win (new seat)				
Conservative win (new seat)				
Conservative win (new seat)				
