= Geoffrey Bindman =

British lawyer (1933–2025)

Sir Geoffrey Bindman KC
- Born: Geoffrey Lionel Bindman; 3 January 1933; Newcastle upon Tyne, England
- Died: 4 November 2025 (aged 92)
- Education: Oriel College, Oxford (BA, BCL)
- Occupation: Human rights lawyer
- Spouse: Lynn Winton (m. 1961)
- Children: 3
- Relatives: David Bindman (brother)

Sir Geoffrey Lionel Bindman, KC (Hon) (3 January 1933 – 4 November 2025) was a British solicitor specialising in human rights law, and founder of the human rights law firm Bindman & Partners. He was Chair of the British Institute of Human Rights from 2005. He won The Law Society Gazette Centenary Award for Human Rights in 2003, and was knighted in 2007 for services to human rights. In 2011, he was appointed Queen's Counsel.

== Early life ==
Bindman was born on 3 January 1933, in Newcastle upon Tyne, where he was also raised, to a family descended from Jewish immigrants. His father Gerald (1904–1974) was a GP who married Rachael Lena Doberman in 1929. Bindman attended the Royal Grammar School, Newcastle, and then left Oriel College, Oxford, with two degrees in law: a BA (later converted to MA) and a postgraduate Bachelor of Civil Law in 1956, qualifying as a solicitor three years later.

Bindman had a second cousin who owns another law firm, Bindman Solicitors LLP, trading as Bindman & Co, in Whickham, Gateshead. His brother was Professor David Bindman (1940–2025), emeritus Durning-Lawrence professor of the history of art at University College London and research fellow at the Hutchins Center for African & African American Research at Harvard University.

== Career ==
Bindman became a legal advisor to the Race Relations Board in 1966, a job he retained for 17 years, also following its merger into the Commission for Racial Equality. He also served as a legal advisor to Amnesty International and represented satirical magazine Private Eye.

Bindman was elected as a Labour councillor for Camden London Borough Council in 1971, representing St John's ward. At the time, he was working for a solicitors' firm in Gray's Inn. Along with his fellow councillors, they funded the establishment of the Camden Community Law Centre. It opened in 1973, and Bindman was the first chairman of its management committee. He did not stand at the subsequent council elections in 1974.

In 1974, Bindman established Bindman & Partners as a firm with the aim of "protecting the rights and freedoms of ordinary people." He has personally acted as lawyer for numerous high-profile people including James Hanratty (executed 1962), Keith Vaz and Jack Straw.

In the late 1980s, Bindman visited South Africa as part of an International Commission of Jurists delegation sent to investigate apartheid and subsequently became editor of a book on the topic, South Africa and the Rule of Law. Bindman also continued his international human rights work, acting as a United Nations observer at the first democratic election in South Africa and representing Amnesty International's interests in the British litigation regarding Augusto Pinochet in the late 1990s.

Bindman was a supporter of OpenDemocracy, for which he wrote over 40 articles, and he chaired The Open Trust from 2003 to 2010.

Bindman was fined £12,000 by the Solicitors Disciplinary Tribunal in 2001 for acting despite having a conflict of interest, as well as for breach of confidentiality. It was remarked at the time that he was the "most eminent" lawyer ever to be brought before such a tribunal. In 2012, Andrew Hopper QC, who was a leading prosecutor before the Tribunal until 2002, reviewed Bindman's case. He found the main charge was at worst "a 'bare conflict' having no adverse consequence" and said the Tribunal's verdict on its seriousness was "incomprehensible". He also suggested the decision to prosecute and the level of the fine were reactions to Bindman's "robust" defence to the charges against him. Hopper sympathised with the view that Bindman was treated "disproportionately because of his stature in the profession".

Bindmans became a limited liability partnership in 2008, and was renamed Bindmans LLP.

In September 2012, Bindman told BBC Radio 4 he agreed with Desmond Tutu that British prime minister Tony Blair should be prosecuted on the grounds that starting the Iraq War was a "crime of aggression" in breach of the United Nations Charter.

In March 2023, Bindman became a signatory to the "Lawyers are responsible" Declaration of Conscience.

== Personal life and death ==
Bindman was a patron of Humanists UK (formerly the British Humanist Association). He listed his recreations as "walking, music, book collecting".

In 1961, he married academic scientist Lynn Janice Winton. She later became a reader (associate professor) in Physiology at University College London.

Bindman died 4 November 2025, at the age of 92. His death was announced by his practice. Condolences were expressed by Jeremy Corbyn.

== Honours ==
Bindman received honorary law doctorates (LLD) from De Montfort University in 2000, and the Kingston University in 2006. He was given the Liberty Award for Lifetime Human Rights Achievement in 1999, and the Centenary Award for Human Rights by The Law Society Gazette in 2003.
