= Piers Wauchope =

British barrister and politician (born 1956)

Leader of the UK Independence Party
- Interim; 12 June 2019 – 10 August 2019
- Preceded by: Gerard Batten
- Succeeded by: Richard Braine

Member of Tunbridge Wells Borough Council
- In office 8 May 2012 – 16 April 2015
- Constituency: Rusthall

Member of Camden Borough Council
- In office 2 May 2002 – 4 May 2006
- Constituency: Belsize
- In office 7 May 1998 – 2 May 2002
- Constituency: Adelaide

Personal details
- Born: October 1956 (age 69) Kent, England
- Party: UKIP (since 2010)
- Other party: Conservative Party (until 2010)

Piers Andrew Charles Wauchope (born October 1956) is a British barrister and politician who served as interim leader of the UK Independence Party (UKIP) between June and August 2019.

== Career ==
Previously a member of the Conservative Party, Wauchope was a councillor representing Adelaide and later Belsize wards in the London Borough of Camden from 1998 to 2006, having unsuccessfully stood in the wards of Holborn (in 1986) and Bloomsbury (in 1994). He served as leader of the Conservative Group, and of the opposition, on Camden Council from 2000 to 2006, replacing Pamela Chesters. After leaving the Conservative Party, he joined UKIP and was elected to the NEC in 2015.

Wauchope trained as a criminal barrister, being called to the bar in 1985, and specialises in children's law, injunctions and domestic violence. In 2010, he made the news after separating two brawling men during a court session at Snaresbrook Crown Court. Wauchope was unhurt in the scuffle, having only his glasses knocked off. In 2015, he represented former UKIP parliamentary candidate Matthew Smith in an electoral fraud case.

He was educated at Worth School and the University of Manchester. In addition to authoring legal guides and contributing to journals, Wauchope has written a political history of the London Borough of Camden called Camden: A Political History 1964-2006, which the Camden New Journal described as "An intriguing, witty read......his retelling of power struggles and forgotten gossip sparkles".

In June 2019, he was appointed interim leader of UKIP, following the resignation of Gerard Batten.

== Electoral history ==
In the 2012 United Kingdom local elections, Wauchope ran as a UKIP candidate and won the Rusthall electoral ward seat on Tunbridge Wells Borough Council. He beat the incumbent Conservative councillor and council leader Bob Atwood by 46 votes. He left the position on 16 April 2015.

He stood to be the first police and crime commissioner for Kent in the 2012 elections, but was eliminated in the first round of voting. He also stood unsuccessfully as a UKIP candidate in the 2016 London Assembly election and the 2019 European Parliament election for the South East England seat.

UK local elections
Election	Constituency	Party	Votes	% of votes	Result
1986 United Kingdom local elections	Holborn	Conservative	458	11.5	Not elected
1998 United Kingdom local elections	Adelaide	Conservative	868	14.1	Elected
2002 United Kingdom local elections	Belsize	Conservative	1,005	13.79	Elected
2006 United Kingdom local elections	Belsize	Conservative	1,205	12.4	Not elected
2012 United Kingdom local elections	Rusthall	UKIP	533	38.5	Elected

UK Parliament elections
Election	Constituency	Party	Votes	% of votes	Result
1997 United Kingdom general election	Coatbridge and Chryston	Conservative	3,216	8.6	Not elected
2005 United Kingdom general election	Hampstead and Highgate	Conservative	10,886	28.5	Not elected
2015 United Kingdom general election	North Thanet	UKIP	12,097	25.7	Not elected
2017 United Kingdom general election	Dover	UKIP	1,722	3.3	Not elected
