= 1978 Camden London Borough Council election =

1978 local election in England

1978 Camden Council election
| ← 1974 | 4 May 1978 | 1982 → |

All 59 seats to Camden Borough Council 30 seats needed for a majority

| | First party | Second party |
|---|---|---|
| Leader | Roy Shaw | Alan Greengross |
| Party | Labour | Conservative |
| Leader since | 1975 | 1974 |
| Leader's seat | Grafton | Frognal |
| Last election | 48 seats | 12 seats |
| Seats won | 33 | 26 |
| Seat change | ▼15 | ▲14 |
| Popular vote | 28,482 | 26,895 |
| Percentage | 47.8% | 45.2% |
- Map of the results of the 1978 election to Camden London Borough Council. Labour in red, Conservatives in blue.
Council Control before election
Labour
Council Control
Labour

The 1978 Camden Council election took place on 4 May 1978 to elect members of Camden London Borough Council in London, the United Kingdom. The whole council was up for election, using new ward boundaries, with one less councillor than had been elected at the 1974 election.

Labour were re-elected with an outright majority, but the Conservatives made gains across the borough, after losing heavily in the 1971 and 1974 elections. The Conservatives gained from Labour three seats in the southern Holborn and St Pancras South parliamentary constituency and eleven in the north (three in the Highgate ward and eight across the Hampstead parliamentary constituency).

== Election result ==
Camden local election results 1978
| Party | Seats | Gains | Losses | Net gain/loss | Seats % | Votes % | Votes | +/− |
|---|---|---|---|---|---|---|---|---|
| Labour | 33 | | | −15 | 54.2 | 47.8 | 28,482 | |
| Conservative | 26 | | | +14 | 45.8 | 45.2 | 26,895 | |
| Liberal | 0 | | | 0 | 0.0 | 4.1 | 2,454 | |
| Others | 0 | | | 0 | 0.0 | 2.9 | 1,707 | |

== Ward results ==
=== Adelaide ===
Adelaide (3)
| Party | Candidate | Votes | % | ±% |
|---|---|---|---|---|
| Conservative | Julian Tobin | 1,825 | | |
| Conservative | Donald Degerdon | 1,793 | | |
| Conservative | Graham Hirschfield | 1,749 | | |
| Labour | Peter Gresham | 1,223 | | |
| Labour | Nova Gresham | 1,208 | | |
| Labour | Nirmal Roy | 1,133 | | |
| Liberal | Jacqueline Kelly | 224 | | |
| Liberal | Nicholas Collins | 204 | | |
| Liberal | Kwamina Sackey | 169 | | |
| Turnout | | | | |
| Conservative win (new seat) | | | | |
| Conservative win (new seat) | | | | |
| Conservative win (new seat) | | | | |

=== Belsize ===
Belsize (3)
| Party | Candidate | Votes | % | ±% |
|---|---|---|---|---|
| Conservative | Anthony Beaton | 1,712 | | |
| Conservative | Tony Kerpel | 1,667 | | |
| Conservative | Michael Brahams | 1,641 | | |
| Labour | Roy Mathias | 981 | | |
| Labour | Arthur Soutter | 979 | | |
| Labour | Verghese Varkki | 924 | | |
| Liberal | Anne Box | 306 | | |
| Liberal | Hilary Hawkins | 275 | | |
| Turnout | | | | |
| Conservative win (new seat) | | | | |
| Conservative win (new seat) | | | | |
| Conservative win (new seat) | | | | |

=== Bloomsbury ===
Bloomsbury (3)
| Party | Candidate | Votes | % | ±% |
|---|---|---|---|---|
| Labour | Martin McNeill | 1,494 | | |
| Conservative | David Harris | 1,399 | | |
| Labour | John Thane | 1,385 | | |
| Labour | Glyn Thomas | 1,373 | | |
| Conservative | Christopher Radmore | 1,355 | | |
| Conservative | David Stone | 1,310 | | |
| Turnout | | | | |
| Labour win (new seat) | | | | |
| Conservative win (new seat) | | | | |
| Labour win (new seat) | | | | |

=== Brunswick ===
Brunswick (2)
| Party | Candidate | Votes | % | ±% |
|---|---|---|---|---|
| Conservative | Kenneth Avery | 1,131 | | |
| Conservative | Andre Potier | 1,017 | | |
| Labour | Ricardo de Freitas | 1,015 | | |
| Labour | David Offenbach | 966 | | |
| Turnout | | | | |
| Conservative win (new seat) | | | | |
| Conservative win (new seat) | | | | |

=== Camden ===
Camden (2)
| Party | Candidate | Votes | % | ±% |
|---|---|---|---|---|
| Labour | Anne Robertson | 852 | | |
| Labour | Ivor Walker | 775 | | |
| Conservative | David Coleman | 496 | | |
| Conservative | Ronald Sears | 440 | | |
| National Front | John Philpot | 59 | | |
| National Front | Esther Sizer | 54 | | |
| Turnout | | | | |
| Labour win (new seat) | | | | |
| Labour win (new seat) | | | | |

=== Castlehaven ===
Castlehaven (2)
| Party | Candidate | Votes | % | ±% |
|---|---|---|---|---|
| Labour | John Tysoe | 1,000 | | |
| Labour | John Lipetz | 996 | | |
| Conservative | Thomas Crawford | 439 | | |
| Conservative | Denis Friis | 406 | | |
| National Front | Gordon Callow | 76 | | |
| National Front | Malcolm Keith | 66 | | |
| Turnout | | | | |
| Labour win (new seat) | | | | |
| Labour win (new seat) | | | | |

=== Caversham ===
Caversham (2)
| Party | Candidate | Votes | % | ±% |
|---|---|---|---|---|
| Labour | Nick Bosanquet | 1,289 | | |
| Labour | Phil Turner | 1,120 | | |
| Conservative | Lilian O'Callaghan | 721 | | |
| Conservative | Morag Valentine | 718 | | |
| National Front | Michael Harkins | 117 | | |
| National Front | Bernard Robinson | 108 | | |
| Communist | Elizabeth Harrison | 100 | | |
| Turnout | | | | |
| Labour win (new seat) | | | | |
| Labour win (new seat) | | | | |

=== Chalk Farm ===
Chalk Farm (2)
| Party | Candidate | Votes | % | ±% |
|---|---|---|---|---|
| Labour | Jonathan Sofer | 1,336 | | |
| Labour | Derek Jarman | 1,223 | | |
| Conservative | Anthony Blackburn | 1,089 | | |
| Conservative | Peter White | 1,013 | | |
| Turnout | | | | |
| Labour win (new seat) | | | | |
| Labour win (new seat) | | | | |

=== Fitzjohns ===
Fitzjohns (2)
| Party | Candidate | Votes | % | ±% |
|---|---|---|---|---|
| Conservative | Ronald King | 994 | | |
| Conservative | John Athisayam | 920* | | |
| Labour | John St. John | 485 | | |
| Labour | Peter David | 477 | | |
| Liberal | Olive Paynton | 193 | | |
| Turnout | | | | |
| Conservative win (new seat) | | | | |
| Conservative win (new seat) | | | | |

=== Fortune Green ===
Fortune Green (2)
| Party | Candidate | Votes | % | ±% |
|---|---|---|---|---|
| Conservative | Richard Almond | 1,055 | | |
| Conservative | John Steel | 1,010 | | |
| Labour | Haydn Gott | 852 | | |
| Labour | Robert Hale | 788 | | |
| Liberal | Clive Agran | 203 | | |
| Liberal | Bryan Karet | 180 | | |
| National Front | Paul Kavanagh | 37 | | |
| National Front | Carol Warren | 31 | | |
| Turnout | | | | |
| Conservative win (new seat) | | | | |
| Conservative win (new seat) | | | | |

=== Frognal ===
Frognal (2)
| Party | Candidate | Votes | % | ±% |
|---|---|---|---|---|
| Conservative | Alan Greengross | 1,363 | | |
| Conservative | Julian Harrison | 1,319 | | |
| Labour | Alan Yates | 481 | | |
| Labour | Richard Wigley | 453 | | |
| Liberal | Brian Sugden | 258 | | |
| Turnout | | | | |
| Conservative win (new seat) | | | | |
| Conservative win (new seat) | | | | |

=== Gospel Oak ===
Gospel Oak (2)
| Party | Candidate | Votes | % | ±% |
|---|---|---|---|---|
| Labour | Ronald Hefferman | 1,125 | | |
| Labour | Tessa Jowell | 1,059 | | |
| Conservative | Peter Barber | 546 | | |
| Conservative | Anthony Earl-Williams | 523 | | |
| Communist | Kenneth Herbert | 102 | | |
| Turnout | | | | |
| Labour win (new seat) | | | | |
| Labour win (new seat) | | | | |

=== Grafton ===
Grafton (2)
| Party | Candidate | Votes | % | ±% |
|---|---|---|---|---|
| Labour | Christopher Gardiner | 1,058 | | |
| Labour | Roy Shaw | 1,049 | | |
| Conservative | David Roberts | 455 | | |
| Conservative | John Martin | 454 | | |
| National Front | Linda Evans | 71 | | |
| National Front | Ian Tomkins | 56 | | |
| Workers Revolutionary | Granville Jones | 37 | | |
| Turnout | | | | |
| Labour win (new seat) | | | | |
| Labour win (new seat) | | | | |

=== Hampstead Town ===
Hampstead Town (2)
| Party | Candidate | Votes | % | ±% |
|---|---|---|---|---|
| Conservative | Ian Tommison | 1,251 | | |
| Conservative | Gwyneth Williams | 1,234 | | |
| Labour | Philip Grenall | 647 | | |
| Labour | David Bookless | 628 | | |
| Liberal | Nigel Barnes | 297 | | |
| Save London Alliance | Anthony Diamond | 61 | | |
| Turnout | | | | |
| Conservative win (new seat) | | | | |
| Conservative win (new seat) | | | | |

=== Highgate ===
Highgate (3)
| Party | Candidate | Votes | % | ±% |
|---|---|---|---|---|
| Conservative | Martin Morton | 2,026 | | |
| Conservative | Roger James | 1,961 | | |
| Conservative | Derek Spencer | 1,966 | | |
| Labour | Walter Burgess | 1,809 | | |
| Labour | David Webster | 1,787 | | |
| Labour | Albert Crouch | 1,774 | | |
| Communist | Margaret Lee | 194 | | |
| Turnout | | | | |
| Conservative win (new seat) | | | | |
| Conservative win (new seat) | | | | |
| Conservative win (new seat) | | | | |

=== Holborn ===
Holborn (2)
| Party | Candidate | Votes | % | ±% |
|---|---|---|---|---|
| Labour | Derek Godfrey | 1,234 | | |
| Labour | Julian Fulbrook | 1,224 | | |
| Conservative | Edith Martin | 1,080 | | |
| Conservative | Brian Rathbone | 1,080 | | |
| Turnout | | | | |
| Labour win (new seat) | | | | |
| Labour win (new seat) | | | | |

=== Kilburn ===
Kilburn (3)
| Party | Candidate | Votes | % | ±% |
|---|---|---|---|---|
| Labour | Patrick Driscoll | 1,242 | | |
| Labour | Neil Fletcher | 1,214 | | |
| Labour | Ken Livingstone | 1,198 | | |
| Conservative | Peter Bolton | 999 | | |
| Conservative | Ann McMullen | 983 | | |
| Conservative | Ronald Rees | 980 | | |
| Independent Labour | Francis Rochford | 496 | | |
| Independent Labour | Albert Skinner | 442 | | |
| Liberal | Richard Waddington | 155 | | |
| Liberal | John Billouin | 141 | | |
| Liberal | Catherine Wilson | 128 | | |
| Turnout | | | | |
| Labour win (new seat) | | | | |
| Labour win (new seat) | | | | |
| Labour win (new seat) | | | | |

=== King's Cross ===
King's Cross (2)
| Party | Candidate | Votes | % | ±% |
|---|---|---|---|---|
| Labour | Anthony Craig | 840 | | |
| Labour | Roderick Cordara | 812 | | |
| Conservative | John Glendinning | 777 | | |
| Conservative | Aileen Griffith | 758 | | |
| Communist | Patricia Langton | 48 | | |
| Workers Revolutionary | Margaret Obank | 40 | | |
| Turnout | | | | |
| Labour win (new seat) | | | | |
| Labour win (new seat) | | | | |

=== Priory ===
Priory (2)
| Party | Candidate | Votes | % | ±% |
|---|---|---|---|---|
| Labour | William Budd | 1,211 | | |
| Labour | Margaret Bowman | 1,184 | | |
| Conservative | Iain Horsburgh | 903 | | |
| Conservative | Richard Smith | 902 | | |
| Liberal | Patrick Cooney | 91 | | |
| Liberal | Alastair Seaton | 80 | | |
| Communist | Alan Thomas | 51 | | |
| Turnout | | | | |
| Labour win (new seat) | | | | |
| Labour win (new seat) | | | | |

=== Regent's Park ===
Regent's Park (3)
| Party | Candidate | Votes | % | ±% |
|---|---|---|---|---|
| Labour | John Mills | 1,714 | | |
| Labour | Florence Parnell | 1,699 | | |
| Labour | Andrew Bethell | 1,685 | | |
| Conservative | Laurence Atlas | 1,551 | | |
| Conservative | Ian Parsley-Taylor | 1,522 | | |
| Conservative | Catherine Mallison | 1,510 | | |
| National Front | Sydney Daly | 145 | | |
| National Front | Gwendoline Evans | 129 | | |
| National Front | Martin Moloney | 127 | | |
| Turnout | | | | |
| Labour win (new seat) | | | | |
| Labour win (new seat) | | | | |
| Labour win (new seat) | | | | |

=== St John's ===
St John's (2)
| Party | Candidate | Votes | % | ±% |
|---|---|---|---|---|
| Labour | Sarah Peltier | 1,187 | | |
| Labour | Maureen Robinson | 1,170 | | |
| Conservative | Paul Brandt | 546 | | |
| Conservative | Roland Walker | 536 | | |
| Turnout | | | | |
| Labour win (new seat) | | | | |
| Labour win (new seat) | | | | |

=== St Pancras ===
St Pancras (2)
| Party | Candidate | Votes | % | ±% |
|---|---|---|---|---|
| Labour | Michael Morrissey | 1,024 | | |
| Labour | Joan Hymans | 1,005 | | |
| Conservative | Anthony Cheverton | 386 | | |
| Conservative | Catherine O'Sullivan | 362 | | |
| National Front | John Haines | 79 | | |
| National Front | John Warren | 61 | | |
| Communist | Jeffrey Sawtell | 39 | | |
| Turnout | | | | |
| Labour win (new seat) | | | | |
| Labour win (new seat) | | | | |

=== Somers Town ===
Somers Town (2)
| Party | Candidate | Votes | % | ±% |
|---|---|---|---|---|
| Labour | Brian Duggan | 1,095 | | |
| Labour | Thomas Devine | 1,093 | | |
| Conservative | Jacqueline Austin | 443 | | |
| Conservative | Noel Moncaster | 399 | | |
| National Front | Andrew Cordier | 73 | | |
| National Front | Andrew Kimber | 59 | | |
| Turnout | | | | |
| Labour win (new seat) | | | | |
| Labour win (new seat) | | | | |

=== South End ===
South End (2)
| Party | Candidate | Votes | % | ±% |
|---|---|---|---|---|
| Conservative | Anthony Kemp | 1,107 | | |
| Conservative | Anthony Robinson | 1,081 | | |
| Labour | Michael Boye-Anawomah | 1,007 | | |
| Labour | John Chanin | 969 | | |
| Liberal | Robert Pellegrinetti | 215 | | |
| Communist | Hubert Bevan | 98 | | |
| Turnout | | | | |
| Conservative win (new seat) | | | | |
| Conservative win (new seat) | | | | |

=== Swiss Cottage ===
Swiss Cottage (3)
| Party | Candidate | Votes | % | ±% |
|---|---|---|---|---|
| Conservative | David Osborne | 1,648 | | |
| Conservative | Michael Flynn | 1,633 | | |
| Conservative | Brian Stoner | 1,602 | | |
| Labour | Christopher Heginbotham | 1,343 | | |
| Labour | Enyd Norman | 1,326 | | |
| Labour | Denis MacShane | 1,274 | | |
| Liberal | Andrew Bridgwater | 297 | | |
| Liberal | Jillian Newbrook | 292 | | |
| Liberal | Janet Heller | 291 | | |
| Turnout | | | | |
| Conservative win (new seat) | | | | |
| Conservative win (new seat) | | | | |
| Conservative win (new seat) | | | | |

=== West End ===
West End (2)
| Party | Candidate | Votes | % | ±% |
|---|---|---|---|---|
| Conservative | Neil Bourhill | 953 | | |
| Labour | Kevin Gould | 938 | | |
| Conservative | Cathleen Mainds | 911 | | |
| Labour | Sandra Wynn | 896 | | |
| Liberal | Ida Linfield | 215 | | |
| Liberal | Martin Biermann | 209 | | |
| Turnout | | | | |
| Conservative win (new seat) | | | | |
| Labour win (new seat) | | | | |
