= 1971 Camden London Borough Council election =

1971 local election in England

1971 Camden Council election
← 1968	13 May 1971	1974 →

All 60 seats to Camden London Borough Council 31 seats needed for a majority
- Turnout: 35.6%

	First party	Second party	Third party
Leader	Millie Miller	Martin Morton
Party	Labour	Conservative	Liberal
Leader since	1969	1970
Leader's seat	Grafton	Did not stand (Alderman)
Seats won	49	11	0
Seat change	▲31	▼31	Steady
Percentage	59.5%	37.7%	1.8%
Swing	▲21.0%	▼17.2%	▼3.7%
Leader before election
Martin Morton
Conservative
Leader
Millie Miller
Labour

The 1971 Camden Council election took place on 13 May 1971 to elect members of Camden London Borough Council in London, England. The whole council was up for election and the Labour Party gained overall control of the council.

== Election result ==
Camden local election results 1971
Party	Seats	Gains	Losses	Net gain/loss	Seats %	Votes %	Votes	+/−
Labour	49	31	0	+31	81.7	59.5		+21.0
Conservative	11	0	31	–31	18.3	37.7		–17.2
Liberal	0	0	0	0	0.0	1.8		–3.7
Others	0	0	0	0	0.0	1.0		–0.1

== Ward results ==
=== Adelaide ===
Adelaide (4)
Party	Candidate	Votes	%	±%
Conservative	Julian Tobin	2,090		
Conservative	Brenda Hennessy	2,087		
Conservative	Madeleine Du Mont	2,068		
Conservative	Huntly Spence	2,031		
Labour	Nicholas Bosanquet	1,981		
Labour	Mark Bass	1,950		
Labour	Nora Henry	1,931		
Labour	Barry Phillips	1,917		
Liberal	Phillip Helemryk	427		
Liberal	Gillian Latimer	244		
Liberal	Sheila Williams	241		
Liberal	Norman Latimer	226		
Turnout				
Conservative hold		Swing		
Conservative hold		Swing		
Conservative hold		Swing		
Conservative hold		Swing		

=== Belsize ===
Belsize (4)
Party	Candidate	Votes	%	±%
Labour	Jill Gibson	2,225		
Labour	John Lipetz	2,132		
Labour	Bernard Taylor	2,130		
Labour	Irving Kuczynski	2,128		
Conservative	Norman Oatway	1,955		
Conservative	Irene Burnett	1,943		
Conservative	Julian Harrison	1,923		
Conservative	Peter Hilton	1,885		
Liberal	Margaret Darvall	352		
Liberal	Mary De La Mahotiere	313		
Communist	Hubert Bevan	292		
Liberal	John Swain	282		
Association of Independents	John Davies	92		
Association of Independents	Anthony Cunnew	74		
Association of Independents	Mary Davies	60		
Turnout				
Labour gain from Conservative		Swing		
Labour gain from Conservative		Swing		
Labour gain from Conservative		Swing		
Labour gain from Conservative		Swing		

=== Bloomsbury ===
Bloomsbury (3)
Party	Candidate	Votes	%	±%
Labour	Jennifer Horne	1,383	55.6	
Labour	Richard Arthur	1,377		
Labour	Florence Parnell	1,345		
Conservative	Ian Galbraith	1,105	44.4	
Conservative	Colin Jaque	1,077		
Conservative	Horace Shooter	1,069		
Turnout			27.8	
Labour gain from Conservative		Swing		
Labour gain from Conservative		Swing		
Labour gain from Conservative		Swing		

=== Camden ===
Camden (4)
Party	Candidate	Votes	%	±%
Labour	James Buckland	2,971	69.0	
Labour	Ivor Walker	2,913		
Labour	George Trevelyan	2,909		
Labour	Phil Turner	2,864		
Conservative	Leslie Langford	970	22.5	
Conservative	Michael Flynn	959		
Conservative	Philp Brandt	942		
Conservative	G. P. Sutherland	919		
Communist	Ann Sedley	362	8.4	
Turnout			36.1	
Labour hold		Swing		
Labour hold		Swing		
Labour hold		Swing		
Labour gain from Conservative		Swing		

=== Chalk Farm ===
Chalk Farm (2)
Party	Candidate	Votes	%	±%
Labour	Peter Jonas	1,171	57.0	
Labour	Derek Jarman	1,154		
Conservative	George Radford	884	43.0	
Conservative	Robert Targett	800		
Turnout			37.8	
Labour gain from Conservative		Swing		
Labour gain from Conservative		Swing		

=== Gospel Oak ===
Gospel Oak (2)
Party	Candidate	Votes	%	±%
Labour	John Keohane	1,137	47.4	
Labour	Brian Loughran	1,112		
Conservative	Kenneth Graham	475	27.9	
Conservative	John Macdonald	471		
Communist	Ken Herbert	90	5.3	
Turnout			46.5	
Labour gain from Conservative		Swing		
Labour hold		Swing		

=== Grafton ===
Grafton (4)
Party	Candidate	Votes	%	±%
Labour	Millie Miller	2,923	76.2	
Labour	John Needham	2,900		
Labour	Roy Shaw	2,830		
Labour	Barry Peskin	2,820		
Conservative	George Paulley	628	16.4	
Conservative	Mary Quilliam	611		
Conservative	Anthony Boosey	599		
Conservative	Malcolm Heath	595		
Communist	Victor Heath	287	7.5	
Turnout			35.8	
Labour hold		Swing		
Labour hold		Swing		
Labour hold		Swing		
Labour hold		Swing		

=== Hampstead Town ===
Hampstead Town (4)
Party	Candidate	Votes	%	±%
Conservative	James Lemkin	2,073		
Conservative	Archie Macdonald	2,071		
Conservative	Harriet Greenaway	2,064		
Conservative	Arthur Roome*	1,996		
Labour	Alix Maxwell	1,574		
Labour	Roger Robinson	1,537		
Labour	Edwin Rhodes	1,511		
Labour	Keith Atkins	1,501		
Liberal	David Sacker	360		
Liberal	Bonamy Bradby	337		
Communist	Betty Tate	258		
Turnout				
Conservative win (new seat)				
Conservative win (new seat)				
Conservative win (new seat)				
Conservative win (new seat)				

=== Highgate ===
Highgate (3)
Party	Candidate	Votes	%	±%
Conservative	Ronald Walker	1,735	46.6	
Labour	John Carrier	1,724	46.3	
Conservative	Christopher Fenwick	1,715		
Conservative	Denis Friis	1,711		
Labour	Jeanne Cox	1,703		
Labour	Bernard Miller	1,656		
Communist	Jean Davis	262	7.0	
Turnout			46.9	
Conservative hold		Swing		
Labour gain from Conservative		Swing		
Conservative hold		Swing		

=== Holborn ===
Holborn (2)
Party	Candidate	Votes	%	±%
Labour	Clive Robinson	1,559	62.2	
Labour	Frank Dobson	1,554		
Conservative	John Barker	949	37.8	
Conservative	Kenneth Avery	923		
Turnout			39.9	
Labour win (new seat)				
Labour win (new seat)				

=== Kilburn ===
Kilburn (3)
Party	Candidate	Votes	%	±%
Labour	Albert (Tim) Skinner	2,263	67.4	
Labour	Robert Humphreys	2,241		
Labour	Francis Rochford	2,204		
Conservative	Martin Guinness	882	26.3	
Conservative	Anthony Wright	870		
Conservative	Ian Tomisson	868		
Liberal	John Gibbs	131	3.9	
Liberal	Colin Brown	122		
Liberal	Violet Green	119		
Communist	Stella McEntire	82	2.4	
Turnout			40.3	
Labour hold		Swing		
Labour hold		Swing		
Labour hold		Swing		

=== King's Cross ===
King's Cross (4)
Party	Candidate	Votes	%	±%
Labour	Lyndal Evans	2,080	58.2	
Labour	Joseph Jacob	2,057		
Labour	Michael Cendrowicz	2,034		
Labour	David Offenbach	2,032		
Conservative	Ian Clarke	1,494	41.8	
Conservative	John Glendinning	1,481		
Conservative	Edith Martin	1,466		
Conservative	Joy Burgess	1,436		
Turnout			36.0	
Labour win (new seat)				
Labour win (new seat)				
Labour win (new seat)				
Labour win (new seat)				

=== Priory ===
Priory (3)
Party	Candidate	Votes	%	±%
Labour	Anthony Clarke	2,170	65.4	
Labour	Glyn Thomas	2,085		
Labour	Enid Wistrich	2,067		
Conservative	Irene Ellis	1,019	30.7	
Conservative	Ronald Raymond-Cox	1,016		
Conservative	Brian Hutchins	1,007		
Communist	Keith Ebbutt	131	3.9	
Turnout			45.7	
Labour win (new seat)				
Labour win (new seat)				
Labour win (new seat)				

=== Regent's Park ===
Regent's Park (4)
Party	Candidate	Votes	%	±%
Labour	Richard Collins	2,766	67.8	
Labour	Paddy O'Connor	2,688		
Labour	John Mills	2,667		
Labour	John Thane	2,605		
Conservative	Ernest Lee	1,311	32.2	
Conservative	Peter Briggs	1,309		
Conservative	Roger Gale	1,298		
Conservative	Marcelle Simpson	1,294		
Turnout			40.1	
Labour win (new seat)				
Labour win (new seat)				
Labour win (new seat)				
Labour win (new seat)				

=== St John's ===
St John's (3)
Party	Candidate	Votes	%	±%
Labour	Corin Hughes-Stanton	1,761	75.1	
Labour	John Palmer	1,743		
Labour	Geoffrey Bindman	1,695		
Conservative	Alan Smith	583	24.9	
Conservative	Peter Bennett	575		
Conservative	Joan Couzens	560		
Turnout			35.8	
Labour hold		Swing		
Labour hold		Swing		
Labour hold		Swing		

=== St Pancras ===
St Pancras (3)
Party	Candidate	Votes	%	±%
Labour	Brian Duggan	2,357	88.4	
Labour	Peter Best	2,342		
Labour	William Oakshott	2,312		
Conservative	Eric Bland	310	11.6	
Conservative	Carol Favell	272		
Conservative	Malcolm Watts	266		
Turnout			32.2	
Labour win (new seat)				
Labour win (new seat)				
Labour win (new seat)				

=== Swiss Cottage ===
Swiss Cottage (4)
Party	Candidate	Votes	%	±%
Labour	Tessa Jowell	2,026	48.9	
Labour	John Eidinow	2,018		
Labour	Arthur Soutter	1,974		
Labour	Ernest Wistrich	1,893		
Conservative	Ronald King	1,804	43.5	
Conservative	Phillippa Raymond-Cox	1,792		
Conservative	Christine Stewart-Munro	1,787		
Conservative	Sidney Torrance	1,780		
Liberal	Kay Peacock	317	7.6	
Liberal	Ray Benad	298		
Turnout			38.8	
Labour win (new seat)				
Labour win (new seat)				
Labour win (new seat)				
Labour win (new seat)				

=== West End ===
West End (4)
Party	Candidate	Votes	%	±%
Conservative	Geoffrey Finsberg	1,941	50.4	
Labour	Brian Arnold	1,914	49.6	
Labour	Joan Hymans	1,888		
Labour	Derek Pollard	1,880		
Labour	Edwin Lichtenstein	1,878		
Conservative	Susan Ayliff	1,852		
Conservative	Christopher Turner	1,841		
Conservative	Gwyneth Williams	1,833		
Turnout			36.8	
Conservative win (new seat)				
Labour win (new seat)				
Labour win (new seat)				
Labour win (new seat)				
