= 1994 Camden London Borough Council election =

1994 local election in England

← 1990	5 May 1994	1998 →

All 59 seats up for election to Camden London Borough Council 30 seats needed for a majority
- Registered: 123,060
- Turnout: 52,027, 42.28% (▼3.90)

	First party	Second party	Third party
Leader	Richard Arthur	Judith Barnes	Flick Rea
Party	Labour	Conservative	Liberal Democrats
Leader since	1993	1990	1988
Leader's seat	Highgate	Belsize	Fortune Green
Last election	42 seats, 48.80%	15 seats, 29.88%	2 seats, 9.86%
Seats won	47	7	5
Seat change	▲5	▼8	▲3
Popular vote	60,590	27,682	21,408
Percentage	52.00%	23.76%	18.37%
Swing	▲3.20	▼6.12	▲8.51
- Map of the results of the 1994 election to Camden London Borough Council. Labour (red) won every councillor in the south and east of the borough, while both they and the Lib Dems (yellow) made in-roads into the Conservative (blue) stronghold of Hampstead.
Leader before election
Richard Arthur
Labour
Leader
Richard Arthur
Labour

The 1994 Camden Council election took place on 5 May 1994 to elect members of Camden London Borough Council in London, England. The whole council was up for election. Labour stayed in overall control of the council, with both them and the Liberal Democrats making gains at the expense of the Conservatives in the north-west of the borough.

== Election result ==
1994 Camden London Borough Council local elections
Party	Seats	Gains	Losses	Net gain/loss	Seats %	Votes %	Votes	+/−
Labour	47	6	1	▲5	79.66	52.00	60,590	▲3.20
Conservative	7	0	8	▼8	11.86	23.76	27,682	▼6.12
Liberal Democrats	5	3	0	▲3	8.47	18.37	21,408	▲8.51
Green	0	0	0	Steady	0.00	3.48	4,049	▼3.98
Camden Charter	0	0	0	Steady	0.00	1.15	1,342	▼2.13
Independent	0	0	0	Steady	0.00	0.61	707	New
Hampstead Charter	0	0	0	Steady	0.00	0.38	442	New
Kilburn Charter	0	0	0	Steady	0.00	0.25	296	New
Total	59						116,516	

== Ward results ==
(*) - Indicates an incumbent candidate

(†) - Indicates an incumbent candidate standing in a different ward

=== Adelaide ===
Adelaide (3)
Party	Candidate	Votes	%	±%
Labour	Peter Day	996	40.38	▲5.36
Conservative	Julian Tobin*	987	39.87	▼3.36
Labour	Peter Bourne	976		
Conservative	Robert Ashley	947		
Conservative	Robert Graham*	926		
Labour	Iain Meek	922		
Liberal Democrats	Vera Miles	308	12.30	▲4.12
Liberal Democrats	Candida Goulden	302		
Liberal Democrats	Madhvi Chanrai	272		
Green	Elizabeth de-Pauley	178	7.45	▼2.83
Registered electors		5,408		▼276
Turnout		2,402	44.42	▼1.13
Rejected ballots		4	0.17	▼0.02
Labour gain from Conservative				
Conservative hold				
Labour gain from Conservative				

=== Belsize ===
Belsize (3)
Party	Candidate	Votes	%	±%
Conservative	Judith Barnes*	920	35.27	▼5.20
Labour	Judith Pattison	884	33.45	▼0.54
Conservative	Joy Silver	859		
Conservative	Huntly Spence*	840		
Labour	Peter Singer	804		
Labour	John Saynor	797		
Liberal Democrats	Pauline Marriott	544	20.69	▲9.21
Liberal Democrats	Diana Brown	511		
Liberal Democrats	James Iddon-Bowen	481		
Green	Kamal Al-Moosa	262	10.59	▼3.47
Registered electors		5,499		▲235
Turnout		2,408	43.77	▼2.92
Rejected ballots		10	0.42	▲0.27
Conservative hold				
Labour gain from Conservative				
Conservative hold				

=== Bloomsbury ===
Bloomsbury (3)
Party	Candidate	Votes	%	±%
Labour	Deidre Krymer	1,281	50.96	▲8.78
Labour Co-op	Shelley Burke	1,256		
Labour Co-op	Nirmal Roy^{†} (Note: Roy was a sitting councillor representing the South End ward)	1,173		
Conservative	Mark Haley	611	24.19	▼0.65
Conservative	William Whittaker	594		
Conservative	Piers Wauchope	556		
Liberal Democrats	Penelope Jones	499	18.42	▲9.77
Liberal Democrats	Andrew Hoddinott	421		
Liberal Democrats	Timothy Pitt-Payne	421		
Camden Charter	Joan Savage	156	6.43	▲1.50
Registered electors		7,308		▲178
Turnout		2,415	33.05	▼4.37
Rejected ballots		5	0.21	▲0.10
Labour hold				
Labour Co-op hold				
Labour Co-op hold				

=== Brunswick ===
Brunswick (2)
Party	Candidate	Votes	%	±%
Labour	Ernest James*	801	53.17	▲12.37
Labour	Brian Weekes	793		
Conservative	Kenneth Avery	429	27.95	▼6.18
Conservative	Michael Stilwell	409		
Liberal Democrats	Frances Tully	292	18.88	▲8.63
Liberal Democrats	Gerard Wall	273		
Registered electors		4,082		▼158
Turnout		1,563	38.29	▼5.51
Rejected ballots		5	0.32	▲0.10
Labour hold				
Labour hold				

=== Camden ===
Camden (2)
Party	Candidate	Votes	%	±%
Labour	Patricia Nightingale	1,304	61.00	▲20.06
Labour	Dermot Greene	1,245		
Liberal Democrats	Marion Fleming	395	16.12	▼9.62
Liberal Democrats	Marc Leggett	278		
Camden Charter	June Swan	264	12.63	▲7.34
Conservative	Paul Short	223	10.24	▼2.26
Conservative	Laudicia Antoine-Perez	205		
Registered electors		5,153		▲48
Turnout		2,115	41.04	▼7.50
Rejected ballots		10	0.47	▲0.27
Labour hold				
Labour hold				

=== Castlehaven ===
Castlehaven (2)
Party	Candidate	Votes	%	±%
Labour	Jane Roberts*	1,056	58.64	▼2.46
Labour	Jasper Williams*	951		
Liberal Democrats	Margaret Finer	271	15.83	▲8.30
Green	Kate Gordon	235	13.73	▲1.74
Conservative	William Mitchell	212	11.80	▼1.11
Conservative	Andrew Scarfe	192		
Registered electors		3,844		▼291
Turnout		1,613	41.96	▼2.97
Rejected ballots		6	0.37	▼0.06
Labour hold				
Labour hold				

=== Caversham ===
Caversham (2)
Party	Candidate	Votes	%	±%
Labour	Bernard Kissen*	1,230	56.95	▲7.34
Labour	Anne Swain	1,196		
Liberal Democrats	Soren Agerholm	329	15.45	▲8.36
Conservative	John Davidson	318	14.46	▼3.96
Conservative	Sylvia Currie	297		
Green	Thomas Payne	280	13.14	▼1.99
Registered electors		4,876		▼201
Turnout		1,947	39.93	▼4.55
Rejected ballots		7	0.36	▼0.13
Labour hold				
Labour hold				

=== Chalk Farm ===
Chalk Farm (2)
Party	Candidate	Votes	%	±%
Labour	Harriet Garland*	847	43.03	▼3.43
Labour	William Budd^{†} (Note: Budd was a sitting councillor representing the Regent's Park ward)	763		
Independent	Jonathan Bucknell	426	22.77	New
Conservative	Anthony Blackburn	421	20.36	▼5.98
Conservative	Michael Farrer	340		
Liberal Democrats	Frances Tattersfield	275	13.84	▲4.90
Liberal Democrats	Ardon Lyon	242		
Registered electors		3,662		▼248
Turnout		1,736	47.41	▼1.52
Rejected ballots		3	0.17	▲0.01
Labour hold				
Labour hold				

=== Fitzjohn's ===
Fitzjohn's (2)
Party	Candidate	Votes	%	±%
Conservative	Ronald King*	552	37.28	▼13.06
Conservative	Cathleen Mainds^{†} (Note: Mainds was a standing councillor representing the Belsize ward)	467		
Labour	David Bookless	391	27.71	▲0.83
Labour	Jonathan Black	366		
Liberal Democrats	Ronald Finlay	233	16.37	▲6.52
Liberal Democrats	Olive Paynton	215		
Independent	Christopher Knight	139	10.16	New
Green	Charles Harris	116	8.48	▼4.45
Registered electors		3,238		▼74
Turnout		1,294	39.96	▼3.61
Rejected ballots		3	0.23	▼0.66
Conservative hold				
Conservative hold				

=== Fortune Green ===
Fortune Green (2)
Party	Candidate	Votes	%	±%
Liberal Democrats	Flick Rea*	1,030	53.50	▲15.31
Liberal Democrats	Jane Schopflin*	866		
Labour	Geoffrey Berridge	523	27.26	▼1.86
Labour	Syed Hoque	443		
Conservative	Paul Crossman	280	14.56	▼8.52
Conservative	Nicholas Jones	235		
Green	Lynn Lovell	83	4.68	▼4.93
Registered electors		3,467		▼162
Turnout		1,781	51.37	▼4.95
Rejected ballots		4	0.22	▼0.02
Liberal Democrats hold				
Liberal Democrats hold				

=== Frognal ===
Frognal (2)
Party	Candidate	Votes	%	±%
Conservative	Pamela Chesters*	800	39.50	▼19.13
Conservative	Dawn Somper	659		
Labour	Dianne Hayter	420	21.59	▲4.12
Labour	Regan Scott	378		
Liberal Democrats	Barbara How	311	16.56	▲4.77
Liberal Democrats	Nigel Barnes	300		
Hampstead Charter	Helen Marcus	270	14.61	New
Green	Sebastian Walker	143	7.74	▼4.37
Registered electors		3,918		▼324
Turnout		1,598	40.79	▼3.97
Rejected ballots		3	0.19	▼0.18
Conservative hold				
Conservative hold				

=== Gospel Oak ===
Gospel Oak (2)
Party	Candidate	Votes	%	±%
Labour	Robert Hall	1,078	55.93	▼5.64
Labour Co-op	John Mills*	838		
Conservative	Iris Coney	313	17.10	▼4.47
Liberal Democrats	Margaret Jackson-Roberts	289	15.88	New
Conservative	Michael Ost	273		
Liberal Democrats	Frances de Freitas	255		
Green	Sheila Oakes	190	11.09	▼5.77
Registered electors		4,297		▼179
Turnout		1,721	40.05	▼8.05
Rejected ballots		4	0.23	Steady
Labour hold				
Labour Co-op hold				

=== Grafton ===
Grafton (2)
Party	Candidate	Votes	%	±%
Labour	Roy Shaw*	1,147	72.10	▲21.46
Labour	Terence Comerford*	1,100		
Liberal Democrats	Elizabeth Hall	227	14.30	New
Conservative	Doreen Bartlett	221	13.60	▲0.75
Liberal Democrats	Anne Elliott	218		
Conservative	Ross Campbell	202		
Registered electors		4,200		▼91
Turnout		1,647	39.21	▼7.45
Rejected ballots		11	0.67	▲0.47
Labour hold				
Labour hold				

=== Hampstead Town ===
Hampstead Town (2)
Party	Candidate	Votes	%	±%
Liberal Democrats	Margaret Little	1,005	52.42	▲20.85
Liberal Democrats	John Dickie	969		
Conservative	Helen Sinclair	471	24.91	▼9.25
Conservative	Maureen Braun*	466		
Labour	Janet Guthrie	336	17.53	▼4.90
Labour	Simon Fitzpatrick	323		
Green	Katharina Wolfe	97	5.15	▼6.69
Registered electors		3,692		▼13
Turnout		1,884	51.02	▲1.49
Rejected ballots		2	0.11	▼0.05
Liberal Democrats gain from Conservative				
Liberal Democrats gain from Conservative				

=== Highgate ===
Highgate (3)
Party	Candidate	Votes	%	±%
Labour	Margaret Cosin*	1,805	47.31	▲2.30
Labour	Richard Arthur*	1,795		
Labour	Deborah Sacks* (Note: Sacks replaced Cllr John Wakeham after his resignation in 1992)	1,731		
Conservative	Cynthia Silk	890	22.39	▼4.52
Conservative	Martyn Fisher	833		
Conservative	Tanya Warburg	801		
Green	Walter Eyres	628	16.72	▲4.14
Liberal Democrats	Richard Waddington	525	13.58	▲6.08
Liberal Democrats	Stephen Molesworth	520		
Liberal Democrats	Henry Potts	484		
Registered electors		7,048		▼396
Turnout		3,544	50.28	▼0.79
Rejected ballots		6	0.17	▼0.04
Labour hold				
Labour hold				
Labour hold				

=== Holborn ===
Holborn (2)
Party	Candidate	Votes	%	±%
Labour	Julian Fulbrook*	1,116	53.30	▲3.94
Labour	Brian Woodrow*	1,017		
Conservative	George Glossop	303	14.39	▼6.29
Camden Charter	Bruno Imerini	301	15.03	New
Conservative	Andrew Lownie	273		
Liberal Democrats	Kevin Jones	212	10.34	New
Liberal Democrats	Caroline Deys	202		
Green	Maxwell Logan	167	6.94	▼4.68
Green	Clive Treliving	110		
Registered electors		4,481		▼95
Turnout		1,994	44.50	▼3.16
Rejected ballots		9	0.45	▲0.08
Labour hold				
Labour hold				

=== Kilburn ===
Kilburn (3)
Party	Candidate	Votes	%	±%
Labour	Heather Johnson	1,581	51.44	▼5.25
Labour	Charlie Hedges*	1,478		
Labour	Timothy Walker	1,450		
Conservative	Anthony Goodman	394	12.39	▼3.66
Conservative	Marian Harrison	356		
Liberal Democrats	Heather Thompson	349	10.88	▲0.80
Conservative	David Mackover	337		
Liberal Democrats	Jeremy Allen	313		
Green	Matthew Pollitt	301	10.30	▼6.88
Kilburn Charter	Lawrence Morris	296	10.13	New
Liberal Democrats	Sally Twite	292		
Independent	Sandra Copeland	142	4.86	New
Registered electors		6,608		▼424
Turnout		2,598	39.32	▼1.66
Rejected ballots		4	0.15	▼0.23
Labour hold				
Labour hold				
Labour hold				

=== King's Cross ===
King's Cross (2)
Party	Candidate	Votes	%	±%
Labour	Angus Walker	1,180	64.73	▲13.73
Labour	John White*	1,109		
Conservative	Grace Gorer	333	18.32	▼2.69
Conservative	Norma Simon	314		
Liberal Democrats	David Charlesworth	300	16.96	▲9.09
Registered electors		4,776		▲241
Turnout		1,710	35.80	▼5.35
Rejected ballots		11	0.64	▲0.16
Labour hold				
Labour hold				

=== Priory ===
Priory (2)
Party	Candidate	Votes	%	±%
Labour	Phil Turner*	1,168	66.09	▲14.70
Labour	Barry Peskin	1,144		
Conservative	Rose Irwin	364	20.70	▼4.59
Conservative	Dorin Peter	360		
Liberal Democrats	Adelaide Kernick	250	13.21	▲4.06
Liberal Democrats	Rita Landeryou	211		
Registered electors		4,353		▼444
Turnout		1,866	42.87	▼6.47
Rejected ballots		4	0.21	▼0.09
Labour hold				
Labour hold				

=== Regent's Park ===
Regent's Park (3)
Party	Candidate	Votes	%	±%
Labour	David Horan*	1,464	47.99	▼4.05
Labour	James Turner*	1,458		
Labour	Richard Olszewski	1,328		
Conservative	Paul Gray	624	20.18	▼9.66
Conservative	David Walters	619		
Conservative	John Wilkin	546		
Liberal Democrats	Jack Gilbert	385	11.99	▲4.29
Liberal Democrats	Jennifer Kavanagh	359		
Camden Charter	Ellen Luby	346	11.72	New
Liberal Democrats	Pamela Lutgen	317		
Green	Dorothy Forsyth	240	8.13	▼2.39
Registered electors		6,079		▼410
Turnout		2,674	43.99	▼4.23
Rejected ballots		2	0.07	▼0.15
Labour hold				
Labour hold				
Labour hold				

=== St John's ===
St John's (2)
Party	Candidate	Votes	%	±%
Labour	Penelope Abraham	1,175	63.47	▲7.58
Labour	John Thane	1,076		
Liberal Democrats	Vivienne Collins	284	14.77	▲9.16
Liberal Democrats	Alastair Loraine	240		
Green	Andrew Wade	211	11.89	▼6.88
Conservative	Roland Walker	177	9.86	▼2.44
Conservative	Anthony Kemp	172		
Registered electors		4,319		▼31
Turnout		1,759	40.73	▼5.73
Rejected ballots		10	0.57	▲0.32
Labour hold				
Labour hold				

=== St Pancras ===
St Pancras (2)
Party	Candidate	Votes	%	±%
Labour	Gloria Lazenby^{†} (Note: Lazenby was a sitting councillor representing the King's Cross ward)	859	64.03	▲10.65
Labour	Mahmud Hasan	810		
Liberal Democrats	Ian Smith	192	14.57	▲7.61
Liberal Democrats	Harriett Goldenberg	187		
Conservative	Mark Hapgood	148	11.35	▼3.31
Conservative	Esther Mundlak	147		
Green	Nigel Armistead	131	10.05	▲0.30
Registered electors		3,485		▼116
Turnout		1,338	38.39	▼3.90
Rejected ballots		1	0.07	▼0.46
Labour hold				
Labour hold				

=== Somers Town ===
Somers Town (2)
Party	Candidate	Votes	%	±%
Labour	Nathalie Lieven	1,197	62.55	▲7.28
Labour	Sybil Shine	1,164		
Camden Charter	Arthur Peeling	275	14.57	▼5.97
Liberal Democrats	Elizabeth Blundell	240	11.76	New
Conservative	David Harris	219	11.12	▼3.81
Liberal Democrats	Mark Finney	203		
Conservative	Carole Ricketts	200		
Registered electors		4,765		▼209
Turnout		1,858	38.99	▼2.75
Rejected ballots		9	0.48	▼0.29
Labour hold				
Labour hold				

=== South End ===
South End (2)
Party	Candidate	Votes	%	±%
Labour	Gerry Harrison	992	47.23	▲0.44
Labour	Sadashivrao Deshmukh^{†} (Note: Deshmukh was a sitting councillor representing the Bloomsbury ward)	882		
Conservative	John Iredale	464	23.19	▼8.03
Conservative	David Sinclair	455		
Liberal Democrats	Dudley Miles	272	13.16	▲4.64
Liberal Democrats	Peter Buonacorsi-How	249		
Hampstead Charter	Jennifer Page	172	8.67	New
Green	Celia Busby	159	7.76	▼5.71
Green	Marguerite Hazell	148		
Registered electors		4,322		▲170
Turnout		1,980	45.81	▼3.97
Rejected ballots		2	0.10	▼0.29
Labour hold				
Labour hold				

=== Swiss Cottage ===
Swiss Cottage (3)
Party	Candidate	Votes	%	±%
Labour	Raymond Adamson	1,076	40.90	▲6.01
Labour	John Macdonald	1,070		
Labour	Patrick Weir	1,015		
Conservative	Anne Morris*	926	34.42	▼3.06
Conservative	Peter Horne*	869		
Conservative	Peter Skolar* (Note: Skolar replaced Cllr Vaughan Emsley after their resignation in 1992)	865		
Liberal Democrats	Elizabeth Burney-Jones	420	15.68	▲7.42
Liberal Democrats	Nicholas Collins	418		
Liberal Democrats	Diana Self	374		
Green	Debra Green	232	9.00	▼4.60
Registered electors		6,044		▼153
Turnout		2,540	42.03	▼6.86
Rejected ballots		4	0.16	▼0.04
Labour gain from Conservative				
Labour gain from Conservative				
Labour gain from Conservative				

=== West End ===
West End (2)
Party	Candidate	Votes	%	±%
Labour	David Lines* (Note: Lines replaced Cllr Julia O. Devote after her resignation in 1992)	933	42.72	▼5.37
Liberal Democrats	Keith Moffitt	839	38.92	▲27.75
Labour	Nicholas Prior	799		
Liberal Democrats	Erich Wagner	739		
Conservative	Sam Mackover	235	11.54	▼13.64
Conservative	Neil Bourhill	233		
Green	Judith Locke	138	6.81	▼4.06
Registered electors		4,136		▲95
Turnout		2,042	49.37	▲0.77
Rejected ballots		3	0.15	▼0.10
Labour hold				
Liberal Democrats gain from Labour				
