= Margaret Darvall =

British mountaineer (1909-1996)

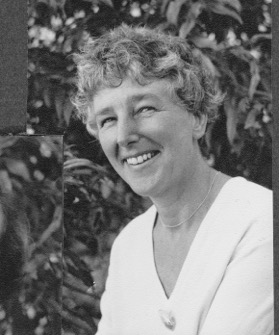
- Margaret Darvall in 1959
- Born: 1909; Berkshire
- Died: 1996 (aged 84–85)
- Education: Somerville College, Oxford

Margaret Patricia Darvall (1909–1996) was a British mountaineer. She was the president of the Ladies' Alpine Club and the Pinnacle Club. Whilst she was president of the Ladies' Alpine Club it merged with the UK Alpine Club.

== Early years ==
Darvall was born in 1909, she was christened in Studland, Dorset and grew up near Reading, Berkshire. She was the youngest child of Richard Thomas Darvall and Annie Johnson of Reading. Her brothers included Air Marshall Sir Lawrence Darvall (1898–1968), the politician and diplomat Frank Ongley Darvall (1906–1987), and Alan Francis Darvall (1903–1983) who was headmaster of Wells House School in Malvern, Worcestershire from 1933 to 1968. In her youth she frequently walked and scrambled with one of her brothers on the limestone coast of Dorset where the family took regular holidays.

She was educated at Somerville College, Oxford, graduating with a degree in English in 1932 and then staying a further year to gain a BA in education in 1933.

== Career and politics ==
Her working life from the 1930s, to her retirement in 1967, was spent at St. Godric's Secretarial College which had been founded by the mother of John Loveridge in Hampstead, north London and "still contained an element of upper secondary education". Initially she was the administrative secretary, between 1939 and the end of the war the college was temporarily relocated to Shropshire but later, after the retirement of the college principle, Darvall bought into the business and she became the college principal until her retirement.

She was a long-standing supporter of the Liberal party and unsuccessfully stood as Liberal candidate for the Belsize ward in the London Borough Council elections of 1964, 1968, 1971 and 1974, the Liberals did not hold a seat in the ward until the 21st century.

== Mountaineering and the Ladies' Alpine Club ==
She only took up mountaineering in the early 1950s. In 1959 she went to the himalaya as a member of the International Women's Expedition to Cho Oyu, 8,188 m (26,864 ft) and the sixth-highest mountain in the world, and Darvall handled much of the pre-expedition arrangements. The all female team also included Loulou Boulaz from Switzerland, Dorothea Gravina and Eileen Healey from the UK, and the French mountaineers Claudine van der Straten, Jeanne Franco, Colette LeBret, Micheline Rambaud and Claude Kogan, who was the overall leader. Amongst the Nepali members were Tenzing's daughters Nima and Pem-Pem and his niece Dhoma. Loulou Boulaz and Margaret Darvall were seriously ill and had to be evacuated to Namche Bazar accompanied by LeBret the doctor. Whilst they were at Namche Bazar, the Sherpa Sirdar Wongdi and Chowang were buried by an avalanche a little above Camp III, although Wongdi freed himself after a two-hour struggle Chowang could not be rescued. The expedition leader, Claude Kogan, with Claudine van der Stratten and the Sherpa Ang Norbu had established Camp IV at 23,300 ft (7,100 m) on 1 October but a spell of bad weather separated them from the rest of the party and after the weather had improved a search, on 4 October, found no trace of the camp leading to the conclusion that the camp and its occupants had been overwhelmed by an avalanche.

Undettered by the losses on Cho Oyu, in 1963 Darvall embarked on an expedition to Turkey's Taurus Mountains. There were no maps, and the country was empty apart from Kurdish brigands who attacked and robbed the party, despite these difficulties they successfully climbed the peak of Mount Erciyes and then went on to climb Demirkazık by the SE ridge.

Darvall was one of four British female mountaineers who were invited to join a group of 60 women on a climb to the summit of Titlis in the Uri Alps, in May 1968, for the foundation of the Rendez-vous Hautes Montagnes. Later that year she travelled to Greenland as a member of the Women's East Greenland Mountaineering Expedition to the Stauning Alps. The Greenland party included Joan Busby (leader), Esme Speakman, Mary Fulford and Eilith Nisbet and they undertook a number of climbs in the area around Bersærkerbræen.

Darvall was elected president of the Pinnacle Club and president of the Ladies' Alpine Club (1973–1975). The merger of the Ladies' Alpine Club with the UK Alpine Club took place during her presidency, "the merger might well not have taken place but for the brilliant strategies of Margaret, together with Janet Carleton, and the LAC might have been allowed just to wither away." In 1976, soon after the merger, Darvall was voted on to the committee of the Alpine Club.
