= 1994 London local elections =

- 5 May 1994

All 1,917 on all 32 London boroughs
- Turnout: 46.1% (▼2.1%)
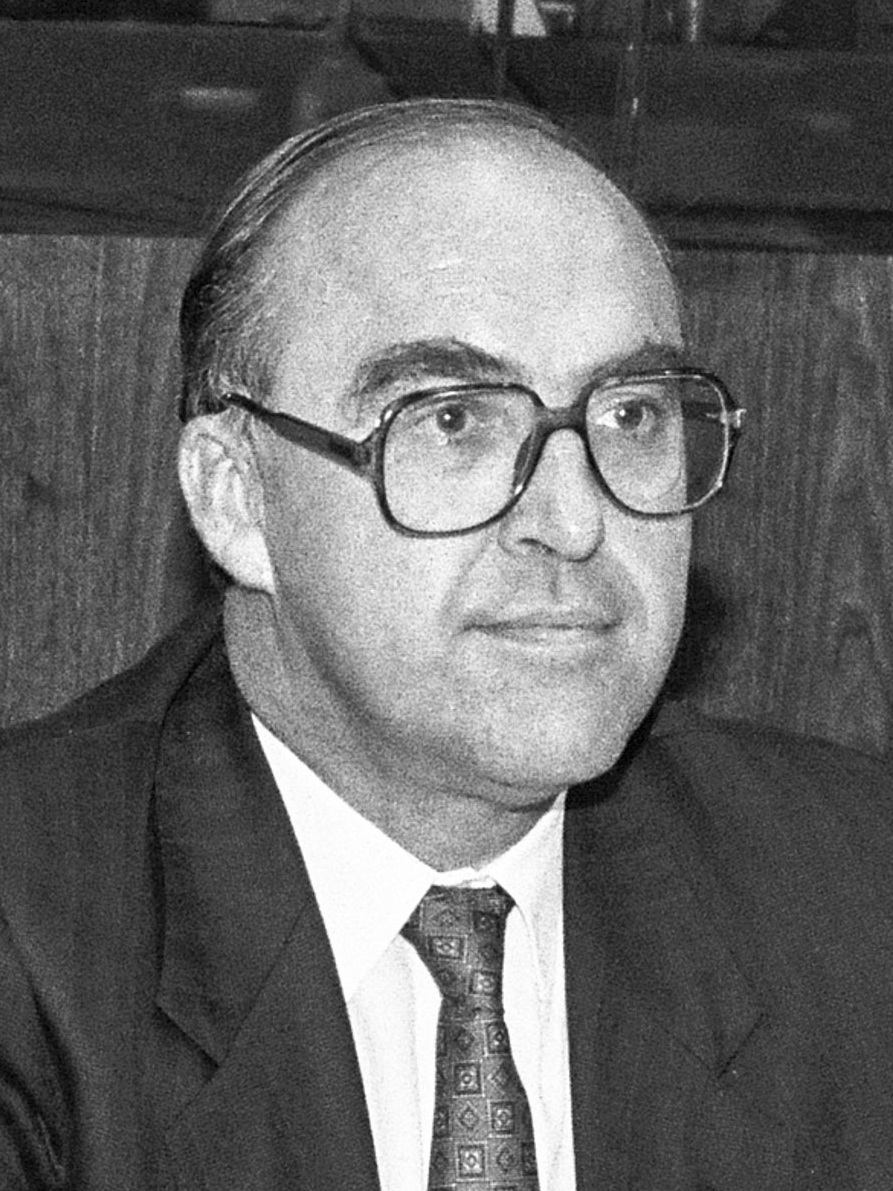

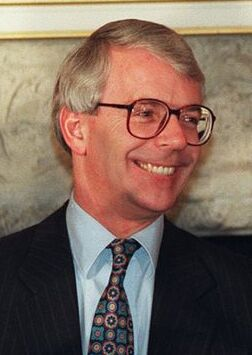

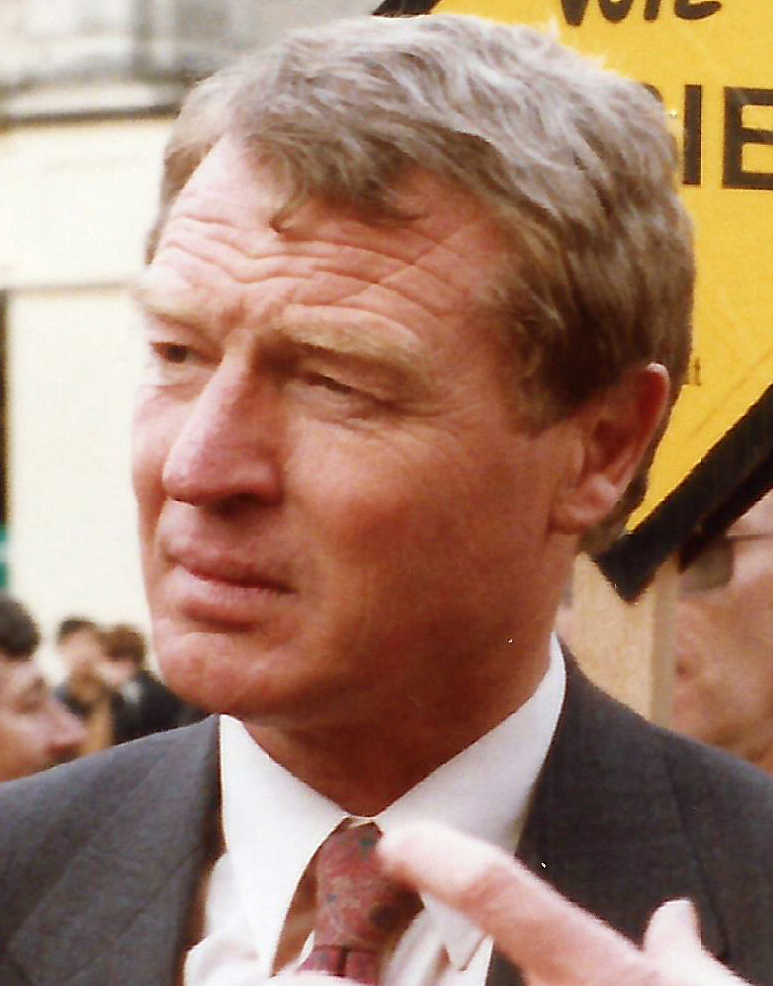
	First party	Second party	Third party
Leader	John Smith	John Major	Paddy Ashdown
Party	Labour	Conservative	Liberal Democrats
Leader since	18 July 1992	28 November 1990	16 July 1988
Popular vote	927,157	696,087	490,259
Percentage	41.6%	31.2%	22.0%
Swing	▲2.7%	▼6.6%	▲7.8%
Councils	17	4	3
Councils +/–	▲3	▼8	0
Councillors	1,044	519	323
Councillors +/–	▲118	▼211	▲96
- Results by Borough in 1994.

Local government elections took place in London, and some other parts of the United Kingdom on Thursday 5 May 1994. Ward changes took place in Barking and Dagenham and Ealing which increased the total number of councillors by 3 from 1,914 to 1,917.

All London borough council seats were up for election. The previous Borough elections in London were in 1990.

The Labour Party under John Smith achieved its best result since 1974, gaining 119 councillors and control of 3 councils. The Conservatives saw heavy losses, losing 212 councillors and 8 councils; the Conservative collapse also benefited the Liberal Democrats, who recovered from their 1990 low point and gained 94 councillors.

== Results summary ==
Party	Votes won	% votes	Change	Seats	% seats	Change	Councils	Change
Labour	927,157	41.6	+2.7	1,044	54.5	+118	17	+3
Conservative	696,087	31.2	-6.6	519	27.1	-211	4	-8
Liberal Democrats	490,259	22.0	+7.8	323	16.8	+96	3	±0
Green	48,798	2.2	-3.7	0	0.0	±0	0	±0
Others	65,858	2.9	-0.4	31	1.6	±0	0	±0
No overall control	n/a	n/a	n/a	n/a	n/a	n/a	8	+5

- Turnout: 2,240,639 voters cast ballots, a turnout of 46.1% (-2.1%).

== Council results ==
Council	Previous control	Result	Details
Barking and Dagenham	Labour	Labour	Details
Barnet	Conservative	No overall control	Details
Bexley	Conservative	No overall control	Details
Brent	No overall control	No overall control	Details
Bromley	Conservative	Conservative	Details
Camden	Labour	Labour	Details
Croydon	Conservative	Labour	Details
Ealing	Conservative	Labour	Details
Enfield	Conservative	Labour	Details
Greenwich	Labour	Labour	Details
Hackney	Labour	Labour	Details
Hammersmith and Fulham	Labour	Labour	Details
Haringey	Labour	Labour	Details
Harrow	Conservative	No overall control	Details
Havering	No overall control	No overall control	Details
Hillingdon	Conservative	Labour	Details
Hounslow	Labour	Labour	Details
Islington	Labour	Labour	Details
Kensington and Chelsea	Conservative	Conservative	Details
Kingston upon Thames	No overall control	Liberal Democrats	Details
Lambeth	Labour	No overall control	Details
Lewisham	Labour	Labour	Details
Merton	Labour	Labour	Details
Newham	Labour	Labour	Details
Redbridge	Conservative	No overall control	Details
Richmond upon Thames	Liberal Democrats	Liberal Democrats	Details
Southwark	Labour	Labour	Details
Sutton	Liberal Democrats	Liberal Democrats	Details
Tower Hamlets	Liberal Democrats	Labour	Details
Waltham Forest	Labour	No overall control	Details
Wandsworth	Conservative	Conservative	Details
Westminster	Conservative	Conservative	Details

== Borough result maps ==
Barnet 1994 results map

Camden 1994 results map

Hammersmith and Fulham 1994 results map
