= Tony Kerpel =

British politician and adviser

Tony Kerpel MBE
- Born: 22 March 1945 (age 81)
- Education: Haberdashers' Aske's Boys' School
- Alma mater: University of Bath (BSc 1968)
- Political party: Conservative Party

Anthony Roger Kerpel MBE (born 1945) is a British retired politician and adviser who served as the personal assistant to Prime Minister Edward Heath, special adviser to Chairman of the Conservative Party Kenneth Baker from 1986 to 1992 and adviser to South African State President F. W. de Klerk from 1993 to 1994.

== Early life and background ==
Kerpel was born on 22 March 1945. He attended Haberdashers' Aske's Boys' School in Elstree, Hertfordshire, before going on to study at the University of Bath, where he graduated with a Bachelor of Science degree in sociology in 1968. He was the president of the university's students' union in 1968 and 1969 and the editor of the then-student newspaper, SUL. Kerpel's degree in sociology and his presidency of the students' union earned him a job at the Department for Education and Science, where he became a press secretary. He was then transferred to the Home Office where he continued to serve as a press secretary for ministers of both Labour and Conservative governments. In 1972, Kerpel took up an offer to work at the British Board of Film Censors as one of its five film examiners and left the Home Office, fulfilling a dream of his. He remained in this position for 14 years.

== Political career ==
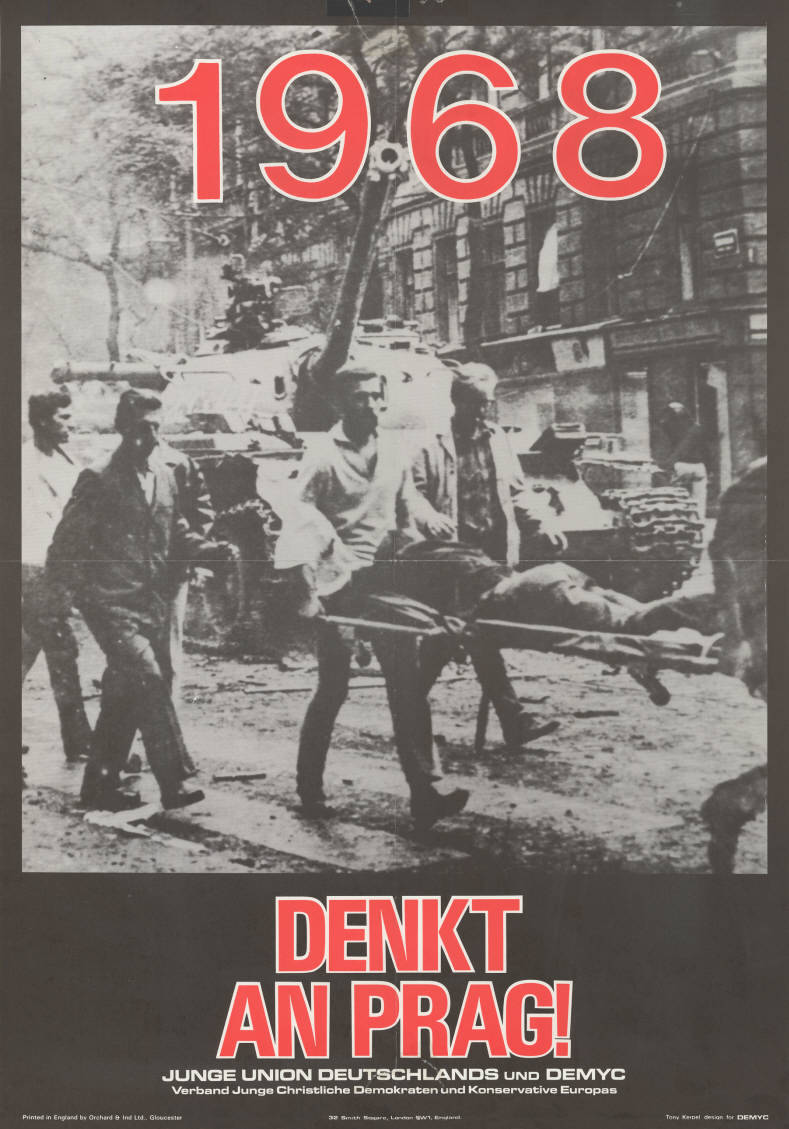
As president of the European Young Democrats and Conservatives, Kerpel designed this poster about the 1968 Prague Spring. It reads: "Think of Prague!"

In 1974, Kerpel became a Conservative councillor for Camden London Borough Council, representing the Swiss Cottage ward until his election to the Belsize ward in 1978. He was previously the personal assistant of Edward Heath, who was serving as Prime Minister (June 1970–March 1974) and Leader of the Conservative Party at the time. In 1975 and 1976, Kerpel served as the national chairman of the Young Conservatives and, from 1977 to 1979, he was the president of the European Young Democrats and Conservatives.

Kerpel became the leader of the Conservative opposition on Camden London Borough Council in 1981, leading the party into the 1982 Camden London Borough Council election. The party lost by a 7-seat margin. He then stood in the 1983 general election as the Conservative candidate for the newly created Holborn and St Pancras constituency, but lost to Labour candidate Frank Dobson. He remained opposition leader in Camden until July 1985, when he resigned after being disillusioned by perceived corruption and intimidation in the council, which he blamed on "the loathsome nature of the Socialists". Kerpel planned to set up a national campaign group to fight corruption in the local government.

From 1986 to 1992, Kerpel was the special adviser to Kenneth Baker. During this time he worked alongside Alistair Burt, Baker's Parliamentary Private Secretary. But, Baker and Kerpel were some of the few supporters of the City Technology Colleges programme inside the government. He also helped Baker write his autobiography The Turbulent Years: My Life in Politics.

From 1993, Kerpel served in the final Apartheid government of South Africa as an adviser to State President F. W. de Klerk. Kerpel continued to advise de Klerk after Apartheid's fall, helping prepare a critical report of the economic policies of the newly elected Black majority government. In 2019 de Klerk claimed to have not known of Kerpel. In the late 1990s Kerpel was the adviser to Shirley Porter, attempting to defend her reputation from the Homes for votes scandal, of which Shirley was involved.

Since his retirement, Kerpel has been president and chairman of the North London Bowling Club. He has also expressed opinion on modern political events, such as when he commented on Prime Minister Boris Johnson's failure to nominate Chris Grayling as Chair of the Intelligence and Security Committee of Parliament in 2020.

== Coalition for Peace Through Security ==
Kerpel was one of the main activists in the Coalition for Peace through Security, a campaigning group strongly opposed to unilateral nuclear disarmament and withdrawal from NATO. Kerpel designed some of the group's posters, namely those critical of the Campaign for Nuclear Disarmament. He also believed the group to be popular enough "to be able to set up an office in Whitehall" (the British government or civil service).

== Honours ==
Kerpel was appointed a Member of the Order of the British Empire (MBE) in the 1981 Birthday Honours for political service.
