= 1974 Camden London Borough Council election =

1974 local election in England

1974 Camden Council election
← 1971	2 May 1974	1978 →

All 60 seats to Camden London Borough Council 31 seats needed for a majority
- Turnout: 37.1%

	First party	Second party	Third party
Leader	Frank Dobson	Martin Morton
Party	Labour	Conservative	Liberal
Leader since	1973	1970
Leader's seat	Holborn	None (defeated in Highgate)
Seats won	48	12	0
Seat change	▼1	▲1	0
Percentage	54.7%	37.1%	7.0%
Swing	▼4.8%	▼0.6%	▲5.2%
Leader before election
Frank Dobson
Labour
Leader
Frank Dobson
Labour

The 1974 Camden Council election took place on 2 May 1974 to elect members of Camden London Borough Council in London, England. The whole council was up for election and the Labour Party stayed in overall control of the council.

== Ward results ==
=== Adelaide ===
Adelaide (4)
Party	Candidate	Votes	%	±%
Conservative	Julian Tobin	2,134	47.8	
Conservative	Madeleine Du Mont	2,101		
Conservative	Huntly Spence	2,080		
Conservative	Donald Degerdon	2,073		
Labour	John Palmer	1,911	42.8	
Labour	Stephen Mullin	1,908		
Labour	Allan Mathias	1,906		
Labour	Miles Seaman	1,865		
Liberal	Margot Aptaker	417	9.3	
Liberal	John Raine	412		
Liberal	Geoffrey McKeenan	394		
Liberal	Phillip Hemerlryk	385		
Turnout				
Conservative hold		Swing		
Conservative hold		Swing		
Conservative hold		Swing		
Conservative hold		Swing		

=== Belsize ===
Belsize (4)
Party	Candidate	Votes	%	±%
Labour	Richard Arthur	2,010	43.1	
Labour	David Mills	1,951		
Labour	Richard Ford	1,915		
Labour	Bernard Taylor	1,898		
Conservative	Julian Harrison	1,847	39.6	
Conservative	Arthur Roome	1,815		
Conservative	Timothy Coghlan	1,801		
Conservative	Peter Grosz	1,773		
Liberal	Margaret Darvall	539	11.6	
Liberal	Richard Franklin	465		
Communist	Hubert Bevan	264	5.7	
Turnout				
Labour hold		Swing		
Labour hold		Swing		
Labour hold		Swing		
Labour hold		Swing		

=== Bloomsbury ===
Bloomsbury (3)
Party	Candidate	Votes	%	±%
Labour	John Guy	1,164	56.6	
Labour	William Evans	1,154		
Labour	John Thane	1,139		
Conservative	Mark Batchelor	892	43.4	
Conservative	Colin Jaque	853		
Conservative	Horace Shooter	839		
Turnout			27.8	
Labour hold		Swing		
Labour hold		Swing		
Labour hold		Swing		

=== Camden ===
Camden (4)
Party	Candidate	Votes	%	±%
Labour	Nicholas Bosanquet	1,892	62.9	
Labour	James Buckland	1,859		
Labour	Phil Turner	1,761		
Labour	Ivor Walker	1,728		
Conservative	David Coleman	612	20.4	
Conservative	Anthony Boosey	609		
Conservative	Ian King	592		
Conservative	George Paulley	558		
Liberal	Mary Taylor	288	9.6	
Liberal	Alan Mather	284		
Liberal	June Mather	276		
Liberal	Daphne Morgan	271		
Communist	Stephen Sedley	215	7.1	
Communist	Marjorie Mayo	203		
Turnout			28.9	
Labour hold		Swing		
Labour hold		Swing		
Labour hold		Swing		
Labour gain from Conservative		Swing		

=== Chalk Farm ===
Chalk Farm (2)
Party	Candidate	Votes	%	±%
Labour	Jonathan Sofer	1,013	55.1	
Labour	Derek Jarman	1,010		
Conservative	Peter Brooke	642	34.9	
Conservative	Philippa Raymond-Cox	631		
Liberal	Eric Watson	182	9.9	
Liberal	Peter Knowles	177		
Turnout			37.9	
Labour hold		Swing		
Labour hold		Swing		

=== Gospel Oak ===
Gospel Oak (2)
Party	Candidate	Votes	%	±%
Labour	Tessa Jowell	1,072	65.4	
Labour	Brian Loughran	1,033		
Conservative	Denis Friis	376	23.0	
Conservative	Robert Targett	347		
Liberal	A Lawrie	115	7.0	
Communist	Henry Martin	75	4.6	
Turnout			42.3	
Labour hold		Swing		
Labour hold		Swing		

=== Grafton ===
Grafton (4)
Party	Candidate	Votes	%	±%
Labour	Christopher Gardiner	2,112	65.3	
Labour	Roy Shaw	2,015		
Labour	Neil McIntosh	1,995		
Labour	John Lipetz	1,920		
Conservative	George Radford	483	14.9	
Conservative	Joanna Radford	446		
Conservative	Sally Mustoe	442		
Conservative	Brenda Friis	440		
Neighbourhood Community Action	Sidney Rawle	320	9.9	
Liberal	Alexandra Lawrie	178	5.5	
Liberal	Peter Dee	152		
Communist	Victor Heath	143	4.4	
Liberal	Phillip Blackwell	133		
Turnout			30.3	
Labour hold		Swing		
Labour hold		Swing		
Labour hold		Swing		
Labour hold		Swing		

=== Hampstead Town ===
Hampstead Town (4)
Party	Candidate	Votes	%	±%
Conservative	Archibald J. F. MacDonald*	1,980		
Conservative	Alan D. Greengross	1,956		
Conservative	Gwyneth A. Williams	1,924		
Conservative	John P. L. Ratzer	1,902		
Labour	John Darlington	1,141		
Labour	Lord George Archibald	1,137		
Labour	James Parish	1,132		
Labour	John Rigby	1,087		
Liberal	Sarah Khuner	557		
Liberal	Nicholas G. Salmon	548		
Liberal	Marion V. Friedmann	523		
Liberal	Raymond A. P. Benad	494		
Communist	Elizabeth P. Tate	152		
Save London Action Group	Andrew R. H. Urquhart	73		
Save London Action Group	Charles E. Carey	57		
Save London Action Group	Robert M. Fysh	53		
Turnout				
Conservative hold		Swing		
Conservative hold		Swing		
Conservative hold		Swing		
Conservative hold		Swing		

=== Highgate ===
Highgate (3)
Party	Candidate	Votes	%	±%
Labour	John Carrier	1,607	44.5	
Labour	Jeanne Cox	1,462		
Labour	Albert J. Crouch	1,380		
Conservative	Martin Morton	1,369	37.9	
Conservative	Christopher Fenwick	1,319		
Conservative	Ronald Walker	1,306		
Liberal	Clive Coates	423	11.7	
Liberal	Alfred Cook	395		
Communist	Peter Richards	210	5.8	
Turnout			48.4	
Labour gain from Conservative		Swing		
Labour hold		Swing		
Labour gain from Conservative		Swing		

=== Holborn ===
Holborn (2)
Party	Candidate	Votes	%	±%
Labour	Frank Dobson	1,375	64.2	
Labour	Derek Godfrey	1,323		
Conservative	Ralph Stone	550	25.7	
Conservative	Peter Bruinvels	546		
Liberal	Peter Davison	218	10.2	
Conservative	Mairi Turner	176		
Turnout			37.0	
Labour hold		Swing		
Labour hold		Swing		

=== Kilburn ===
Kilburn (3)
Party	Candidate	Votes	%	±%
Labour	Albert (Tim) Skinner	1,432	61.0	
Labour	Francis Rochford	1,423		
Labour	Robert Humphreys	1,384		
Conservative	Peter Briggs	664	28.3	
Conservative	George Maxwell	652		
Conservative	Ronald Rees	638		
Liberal	John Standish	252	10.7	
Liberal	Dennis Darnes	229		
Liberal	Gillian Little	217		
Turnout			33.3	
Labour hold		Swing		
Labour hold		Swing		
Labour hold		Swing		

=== King's Cross ===
King's Cross (4)
Party	Candidate	Votes	%	±%
Labour	David Offenbach	1,745	51.8	
Labour	David Windsor	1,730		
Labour	Margaret Robertson	1,721		
Labour	Lyndal Evans	1,698		
Conservative	John Glendinning	1,193	35.4	
Conservative	Graham Hirschfield	1,110		
Conservative	Kenneth Avery	1,108		
Conservative	Kenneth Graham	1,089		
Liberal	John Bishop	431	12.8	
Liberal	Anthony Connell	405		
Liberal	Raymond Marks	363		
Liberal	Margaret Maclaren	360		
Turnout			36.9	
Labour hold		Swing		
Labour hold		Swing		
Labour hold		Swing		
Labour hold		Swing		

=== Priory ===
Priory (3)
Party	Candidate	Votes	%	±%
Labour	Anthony Clarke	1,846	56.6	
Labour	Derek Pollard	1,604		
Labour	Glyn Thomas	1,451		
Conservative	Frederick Kingsley	806	24.7	
Conservative	Colin Mackay	752		
Conservative	Anthony van der Elst	707		
Liberal	Iain Scarlet	385	11.8	
Communist	Alan Thomas	225	6.9	
Communist	Ronald Champion	115		
Turnout			43.3	
Labour hold		Swing		
Labour hold		Swing		
Labour hold		Swing		

=== Regent's Park ===
Regent's Park (4)
Party	Candidate	Votes	%	±%
Labour	Richard Collins	2,053	65.4	
Labour	Anthony Bethell	1,986		
Labour	Paddy O'Connor	1,975		
Labour	John Mills	1,974		
Conservative	Clare Mansel	1,085	34.6	
Conservative	Malcolm Watts	1,054		
Conservative	John Blundell	1,052		
Conservative	Michael Flynn	1,038		
Turnout			37.0	
Labour hold		Swing		
Labour hold		Swing		
Labour hold		Swing		
Labour hold		Swing		

=== St John's ===
St John's (3)
Party	Candidate	Votes	%	±%
Labour	Roger Robinson	1,488	73.2	
Labour	Corin Hughes-Stanton	1,473		
Labour	Sarah (Sally) Peltier	1,438		
Conservative	John Livingston	379	18.6	
Conservative	Dennis Murfitt	376		
Conservative	Christina Brennan	368		
Liberal	Florence Elliot	167	8.2	
Liberal	Christopher Evans	165		
Liberal	Micheline Sartoretti	133		
Turnout			34.6	
Labour hold		Swing		
Labour hold		Swing		
Labour hold		Swing		

=== St Pancras ===
St Pancras (3)
Party	Candidate	Votes	%	±%
Labour	Brian Duggan	1,865	85.9	
Labour	Florence Parnell	1,739		
Labour	John Toomey	1,729		
Conservative	Jaqueline Wilson	306	14.1	
Conservative	Ian Clarke	305		
Conservative	Christopher Turner	294		
Turnout			30.6	
Labour hold		Swing		
Labour hold		Swing		
Labour hold		Swing		

=== Swiss Cottage ===
Swiss Cottage (4)
Party	Candidate	Votes	%	±%
Conservative	Ron King	1,636	45.7	
Conservative	Ronald Raymond-Cox	1,625		
Conservative	Anthony Kerpel	1,616		
Conservative	Brian Stoner	1,559		
Labour	William Budd	1,535	42.8	
Labour	Walter Burgess	1,533		
Labour	Arthur Soutter *	1,508		
Labour	Gurmukh Singh	1,465		
Liberal	Kenneth Carter	412	11.5	
Liberal	Robert Pellegrinetti	369		
Turnout			38.3	
Conservative gain from Labour		Swing		
Conservative gain from Labour		Swing		
Conservative gain from Labour		Swing		
Conservative gain from Labour		Swing		

=== West End ===
West End (4)
Party	Candidate	Votes	%	±%
Labour	David Blake	1,858	44.7	
Labour	Samuel Waldman	1,842		
Labour	Robert Hefferman	1,784		
Labour	Joan Hymans	1,777		
Conservative	Ian Tomisson	1,762	42.4	
Conservative	John Steel	1,759		
Conservative	Peter Clemerson	1,725		
Conservative	James Turner	1,723		
Liberal	Kathleen Peacock	447	10.8	
Independent	Claudina Eastwall-Naijna	86	2.1	
Turnout			41.8	
Labour gain from Conservative		Swing		
Labour hold		Swing		
Labour hold		Swing		
Labour hold		Swing		
