= David Bindman =

English professor of art history (1940–2025)

- Born: 12 September 1940
- Died: 2025 (aged 84)
- Education: Oxford University; Harvard University; Courtauld Institute of Art
- Occupation: Professor of art history
- Relatives: Geoffrey Bindman (brother)

David Bindman (12 September 1940 – 2025) was an English academic of art who was emeritus Durning-Lawrence professor of the history of art at University College London, and was a research fellow at the Hutchins Center for African & African American Research (formerly W. E. B. Du Bois Research Institute) at Harvard University from 2006. Bindman died in 2025, at the age of 84. He was the brother of human rights lawyer Geoffrey Bindman.

== Early life ==
David Bindman was born on 12 September 1940. He was educated at Oxford University, Harvard University and the Courtauld Institute of Art, London.

== Career ==
Bindman was emeritus professor of the history of art at University College London. In 2015, a festschrift was published in his honour by UCL Press, titled Burning Bright.

== Selected publications ==
- Blake as an artist. Phaidon, 1977. ISBN 978-0714816371
- Hogarth. Thames & Hudson, London, 1981.
- Shadow of the guillotine: Britain and the French Revolution. British Museum Publications, London, 1989. ISBN 0714116378
- Roubiliac and the Eighteenth-Century Monument: Sculpture as Theatre. Yale University Press, New Haven, 1995. (With Malcolm Baker) ISBN 978-0300063332
- Hogarth and his times: Serious comedy. British Museum Press, London, 1997. US: University of California Press.
- William Blake: The complete illuminated books. Thames & Hudson, London, 2000. ISBN 0500510148
- Ape to Apollo: Aesthetics and the idea of race in the 18th century. Cornell University Press, 2002. ISBN 978-0801440854
- John Flaxman: Line into contour. Ikon Gallery, 2013. ISBN 978-1904864813
