= Belsize (ward) =

Electoral ward in the London borough of Camden

- Electoral ward for the Camden London Borough Council
- Belsize ward boundaries since 2022
- Borough: Camden
- County: Greater London
- Population: 12,299 (2021) (Note: 2021 Census data reported for 2022 ward boundaries)
- Electorate: 8,497 (2022)
- Major settlements: Belsize Park
- Area: 1.048 square kilometres (0.405 sq mi) (2022)

Current electoral ward
- Created: 1965
- Number of members: 1965–1978: 4; 1978–present: 3
- Councillors: Tom Simon; Judy Dixey; Matthew Kirk
- ONS code: 00AGGD (2002–2022)
- GSS code: E05000128 (2002–2022); E05013652 (2022–present)

Belsize (/ˈbɛlsaɪz/) is an electoral ward in the London Borough of Camden. The ward has existed since the creation of the borough on 1 April 1965 and was first used in the 1964 elections. It returns councillors to Camden London Borough Council. Centred on Belsize Park, it was subject to boundary revisions in 1971, 1978, 2002 and 2022. The number of councillors representing the ward was reduced from four to three in 1978. Notable councillors have included Labour council leader Richard Arthur, solicitor David Mills, Conservative opposition leader and political advisor Tony Kerpel, barrister Piers Wauchope, Conservative opposition leader Claire-Louise Leyland and Liberal Democrats group leader Luisa Porritt.

== List of councillors ==
The ward was initially represented by four councillors. This decreased to three from 1978.

Seat	Councillor	Took office	Left office	Party	Election
1	Norman Oatway	1964	1971	Conservative	1964, 1968
2	Stanley Duncan	1964	1968	Conservative	1964
3	Irene Burnett	1964	1971	Conservative	1964, 1968
4	Leslie Room	1964	1968	Conservative	1964
2	Kenneth Evans	1968	1971	Conservative	1968
4	Julian Harrison	1968	1971	Conservative	1968
1	Jill Gibson	1971	1974	Labour	1971
2	John Lipetz	1971	1974	Labour	1971
3	Bernard Taylor	1971	1978	Labour	1971, 1974
4	Irving Kuczynski	1971	1974	Labour	1971
1	Richard Arthur	1974	1976	Labour	1974
2	David Mills	1974	1978	Labour	1974
4	Richard Ford	1974	1978	Labour	1974
1	Martin Morton	1976	1978	Conservative	1976
1	Anthony Beaton	1978	1980	Conservative	1978
2	Tony Kerpel	1978	1986	Conservative	1978, 1982
3	Michael Brahams	1978	1982	Conservative	1978
1	Cathleen Mainds	1980	1982	Conservative	1980
1	Huntly Spence	1982	1994	Conservative	1982, 1986, 1990
3	Gerald Swyer	1982	1986	Conservative	1982
2	Judith Barnes	1986	1998	Conservative	1986, 1990, 1994
3	Colin Glover	1986	1990	Conservative	1986
3	Cathleen Mainds	1990	1994	Conservative	1990
1	Judith Pattison	1994	1998	Labour	1994
3	Joy Silver	1994	1998	Conservative	1994
1	Aileen Hammond	1998	2002	Labour	1998
2	Ewan Cameron	1998	2002	Conservative	1998
3	Huntly Spence	1998	2002	Conservative	1998
1	Jonny Bucknell	2002	2006	Conservative	2002
2	Sheila Gunn	2002	2006	Conservative	2002
3	Piers Wauchope	2002	2006	Conservative	2002
1	Alexis Rowell	2006	2010	Liberal Democrats	2006
2	Christopher Basson	2006	2009	Liberal Democrats	2006
3	Arthur Graves	2006	2010	Liberal Democrats	2006
2	Tom Simon	2009	2014	Liberal Democrats	2009, 2010
1	Jonny Bucknell	2010	2018	Conservative	2010, 2014
3	Claire-Louise Leyland	2010	2018	Conservative	2010, 2014
2	Leila Roy	2014	2018	Conservative	2014
1	Steve Adams	2018	2022	Conservative	2018
2	Tom Simon	2018	Incumbent	Liberal Democrats	2022, 2026
3	Luisa Porritt	2018	2022	Liberal Democrats	2018
1	Judy Dixey	2022	Incumbent	Liberal Democrats	2022, 2026
3	Matthew Kirk	2022	Incumbent	Liberal Democrats	2022, 2026

== Summary ==
Councillors elected by party at each general borough election.

- Conservative
- Labour
- Liberal Democrats

== Camden council elections since 2022 ==
There was a revision of ward boundaries in Camden in 2022. Belsize lost territory to Haverstock and Primrose Hill wards and gained from Frognal and Fitzjohns and Hampstead Town.

=== 2026 election ===
The election took place on 7 May 2026.

2026 Camden London Borough Council election: Belsize
Party	Candidate	Votes	%	±%
Liberal Democrats	Judy Dixey	1,191	35.7	
Liberal Democrats	Tom Simon	1,162	34.8	
Liberal Democrats	Matthew Kirk	1,132	33.9	
Conservative	Alexander Donnelly	1,028	30.8	
Conservative	Peter Horne	949	28.4	
Conservative	Shelley Rubinstein	949	28.4	
Green	Stefano Casalotti	548	16.4	
Labour	Dan Bilenga	488	14.6	
Labour	Tamsin Mitchell	488	14.6	
Green	Jessica Noske-Turner	468	14.0	
Labour	Neville McKay	464	13.9	
Green	Bobby Raj	393	11.8	
Reform	Joycelyn Buffouge	261	7.8	
Reform	Coren Lass	261	7.8	
Reform	Candice McElroy	236	7.1	
Turnout			39.21	+0.81
Liberal Democrats hold		Swing		
Liberal Democrats hold		Swing		
Liberal Democrats hold		Swing		

=== 2022 election ===
The election took place on 5 May 2022.

2022 Camden London Borough Council election: Belsize
Party	Candidate	Votes	%	±%
Liberal Democrats	Tom Simon	1,494		
Liberal Democrats	Judy Dixey	1,445		
Liberal Democrats	Matthew Kirk	1,317		
Conservative	Oliver Cooper (Note: Oliver Cooper, Conservative group leader of Camden Council, was a councillor for Hampstead Town ward from 2015 to 2022.)	1,124		
Conservative	Steve Adams	1,106		
Conservative	Aarti Joshi	953		
Labour	Issy Waite	705		
Labour	Shaheen Ahmed Chowdhury	692		
Labour	Peter Ptashko	644		
Turnout			38.4	
Liberal Democrats win (new boundaries)				
Liberal Democrats win (new boundaries)				
Liberal Democrats win (new boundaries)				

== 2002–2022 Camden council elections ==
Belsize ward boundaries from 2002 to 2022

There was a revisions of ward boundaries in Camden in 2002.

=== 2018 election ===
The election took place on 3 May 2018.

2018 Camden London Borough Council election: Belsize
Party	Candidate	Votes	%	±%
Liberal Democrats	Tom Simon	1,250	11.6	▲0.9
Conservative	Steve Adams	1,201	11.2	▼2.0
Liberal Democrats	Luisa Porritt	1,179	11.0	▲2.8
Conservative	Leila Roy	1,170	10.9	▼1.6
Conservative	Kirsty Roberts	1,162	10.8	▼0.2
Liberal Democrats	Benjamin Newman	1,127	10.5	▲3.2
Labour	James Calmus	1,067	10.0	▼0.2
Labour	Sucharita Sethi	996	9.3	▲0.8
Labour	Momota Khatoon	971	9.1	▲1.4
Green	Sara Katchi	238	2.2	▼0.8
Green	Phyl Eyres	223	2.1	▼0.8
Independent	Nigel Rumble	123	1.1	▼1.1
Majority		9	0.08	
Turnout		10,707	42.5	▲4.2
Liberal Democrats gain from Conservative		Swing		
Conservative hold		Swing		
Liberal Democrats gain from Conservative		Swing		

=== 2014 election ===
The election took place on 22 May 2014.

2014 Camden London Borough Council election: Belsize
Party	Candidate	Votes	%	±%
Conservative	Jonny Bucknell	1,219	13.2	
Conservative	Claire-Louise Leyland	1,157	12.5	
Conservative	Leila Roy	1,016	11.0	
Liberal Democrats	Tom Simon	992	10.7	
Labour	Madeleine Jennings	939	10.2	
Labour	James McGowan	782	8.5	
Liberal Democrats	Bradley Hillier-Smith	760	8.2	
Labour	Harunur Rashid	709	7.7	
Liberal Democrats	Lawrence Nicholson	678	7.3	
Green	Rowan St Clair	275	3.0	
Green	Darren Murphy	269	2.9	
Green	Stuart Temple Taylor	243	2.6	
Independent	Nigel Rumble	199	2.2	
Majority		24	0.3	
Turnout		9,238	38.3	
Conservative hold		Swing		
Conservative hold		Swing		
Conservative gain from Liberal Democrats		Swing		

=== 2010 election ===
The election on 6 May 2010 took place on the same day as the United Kingdom general election.

2010 Camden London Borough Council election: Belsize
Party	Candidate	Votes	%	±%
Conservative	Jonny Bucknell	1,969	36.1	−1.0
Conservative	Claire-Louise Leyland	1,969	36.1	−0.1
Liberal Democrats	Tom Simon	1,949	35.7	−5.1
Conservative	Nigel Rumble	1,897	34.8	−0.9
Liberal Democrats	Anne Ward	1,746	32.0	−8.5
Liberal Democrats	Paul Perkins	1,727	31.7	−6.4
Labour	Samantha Gunasekera	1,094	20.1	+6.2
Labour	Sada Deshmukh	1,051	19.3	+5.1
Labour	Luca Salice	1,027	18.8	+6.5
Green	Anya Courts	410	7.5	−0.3
Green	Sophie North	372	6.8	−1.6
Green	Francesca Richards-Spiller	325	6.0	−0.2
BNP	Derek Collins	90	1.7	N/A
Turnout		5,454	62.3	+24.0
Conservative gain from Liberal Democrats		Swing		
Conservative gain from Liberal Democrats		Swing		
Liberal Democrats hold		Swing		

=== 2009 by-election ===
The by-election took place on 2 April 2009, following the resignation of Christopher Basson.

2009 Belsize by-election
Party	Candidate	Votes	%	±%
Liberal Democrats	Tom Simon	1,136	46.0	+5.4
Conservative	Gary Bernadout	952	38.6	+1.7
Labour	Sean Birch	270	10.9	−3.2
Green	Naomi Aptowitzer	109	4.4	−3.9
Majority		184	7.5	
Turnout		2,467	29.8	
Liberal Democrats hold		Swing		

=== 2006 election ===
The election took place on 4 May 2006.

2006 Camden London Borough Council election: Belsize
Party	Candidate	Votes	%	±%
Liberal Democrats	Alexis Rowell	1,358	40.8	+22.7
Liberal Democrats	Christopher Basson	1,349	40.5	+24.0
Liberal Democrats	Arthur Graves	1,268	38.1	+21.8
Conservative	Jonathan Bucknell	1,233	37.1	−3.0
Conservative	Piers Wauchope	1,205	36.2	−2.5
Conservative	Sheila Gunn	1,187	35.7	−3.4
Labour	Sadashivrao Deshmukh	471	14.2	−13.4
Labour	Matthew McGregor	462	13.9	−15.8
Labour	Jenny Westaway	410	12.3	−14.3
Green	Jane Ennis	278	8.4	−2.2
Green	Anya Courts	260	7.8	−1.3
Green	Adam Spanier	207	6.2	−2.2
Turnout		9,688	38.3	
Liberal Democrats gain from Conservative		Swing		
Liberal Democrats gain from Conservative		Swing		
Liberal Democrats gain from Conservative		Swing		

=== 2002 election ===
The election took place on 2 May 2002.

2002 Camden London Borough Council election: Belsize
Party	Candidate	Votes	%	±%
Conservative	Jonny Bucknell	1,041	40.1	
Conservative	Sheila Gunn	1,016	39.1	
Conservative	Piers Wauchope	1,005	38.7	
Labour	Aileen Hammond	770	29.7	
Labour	Sadashivrao Deshmukh	716	27.6	
Labour	Patricia Nightingale	691	26.6	
Liberal Democrats	Pauline Marriott	469	18.1	
Liberal Democrats	Ardon Lyon	429	16.5	
Liberal Democrats	Dudley Miles	423	16.3	
Green	Phyllis Eyres	274	10.6	
Green	Jack Price	236	9.1	
Green	Maeve Tornero	219	8.4	
Turnout		7,289		
Conservative win (new boundaries)				
Conservative win (new boundaries)				
Conservative win (new boundaries)				

== 1978–2002 Camden council elections ==
Belsize ward boundaries from 1978 to 2002

There was a revision of ward boundaries in Camden in 1978.

=== 1998 election ===
The election on 7 May 1998 took place on the same day as the 1998 Greater London Authority referendum.

1998 Camden London Borough Council election: Belsize
Party	Candidate	Votes	%	±%
Conservative	Ewan Cameron	760		
Conservative	Huntly Spence	731		
Labour	Aileen Hammond	711		
Conservative	Jonathan Bucknell	705		
Labour	David Taggart	650		
Labour	Jake Sumner	624		
Liberal Democrats	Pauline Marriott	587		
Liberal Democrats	Dudley Miles	522		
Liberal Democrats	Ronald Watts	455		
Green	Phyllis Eyres	290		
Turnout		6,035	35.2	
Conservative hold		Swing		
Conservative hold		Swing		
Labour hold		Swing		

=== 1994 election ===
The election took place on 5 May 1994.

1994 Camden London Borough Council election: Belsize
Party	Candidate	Votes	%	±%
Conservative	Judith Barnes	920		
Labour	Judith Pattison	884		
Conservative	Joy Silver	859		
Conservative	Huntly Spence	840		
Labour	Peter Singer	804		
Labour	John Saynor	797		
Liberal Democrats	Pauline Marriott	544		
Liberal Democrats	Diana Brown	511		
Liberal Democrats	James Iddon-Bowen	481		
Green	Kamal Al-Moosa	262		
Turnout			43.8%	
Conservative hold		Swing		
Labour gain from Conservative		Swing		
Conservative hold		Swing		

=== 1990 election ===
The election took place on 3 May 1990.

1990 Camden London Borough Council election: Belsize
Party	Candidate	Votes	%	±%
Conservative	Judith Barnes	1,159		
Conservative	Cathleen Mainds	1,124		
Conservative	Huntly Spence	1,109		
Labour	Judith Pattison	971		
Labour	Michael Rice	952		
Labour	Deborah Sacks	928		
Green	Conchita Vasey	393		
Liberal Democrats	Anne Box	329		
Liberal Democrats	Pauline Marriott	324		
Liberal Democrats	Ardon Lyon	310		
Turnout				
Conservative hold		Swing		
Conservative hold		Swing		
Conservative hold		Swing		

=== 1986 election ===
The election took place on 8 May 1986.

1986 Camden London Borough Council election: Belsize
Party	Candidate	Votes	%	±%
Conservative	Colin Glover	1,055		
Conservative	Huntly Spence	1,039		
Conservative	Judith Barnes	1,005		
Labour	Margaret McPhee	888		
Labour	Malcolm Bull	875		
Labour	Ramendra Bhattacharyya	841		
Alliance	David Davies	818		
Alliance	Pauline Marriott	788		
Alliance	Dudley Miles	756		
Green	Philippa Draper	236		
Turnout				
Conservative hold		Swing		
Conservative hold		Swing		
Conservative hold		Swing		

=== 1982 election ===
The election took place on 6 May 1982.

1982 Camden London Borough Council election: Belsize
Party	Candidate	Votes	%	±%
Conservative	Tony Kerpel	1,411		
Conservative	Huntly Spence	1,381		
Conservative	Gerald Swyer	1,335		
Alliance	Margaret Little	761		
Alliance	Robert Heyland	751		
Alliance	Clive Agran	730		
Labour	Alan Griffiths	703		
Labour	Anthea Muir	678		
Labour	Roy Mathias	670		
Ecology	Lesley Sargent	102		
Ecology	Steven Margolis	85		
Turnout				
Conservative hold		Swing		
Conservative hold		Swing		
Conservative hold		Swing		

=== 1980 by-election ===
The by-election took place on 17 April 1980, following the resignation of Anthony Beaton.

1980 Belsize by-election
Party	Candidate	Votes	%	±%
Conservative	Cathleen Mainds	1,235		
Labour	Allen Mathias	785		
Liberal	Andrew Bridgwater	288		
Turnout				
Conservative hold		Swing		

=== 1978 election ===
The election took place on 4 May 1978.

1978 Camden London Borough Council election: Belsize
Party	Candidate	Votes	%	±%
Conservative	Anthony Beaton	1,712		
Conservative	Tony Kerpel	1,667		
Conservative	Michael Brahams	1,641		
Labour	Roy Mathias	981		
Labour	Arthur Soutter	979		
Labour	Verghese Varkki	924		
Liberal	Anne Box	306		
Liberal	Hilary Hawkins	275		
Turnout				
Conservative win (new boundaries)				
Conservative win (new boundaries)				
Conservative win (new boundaries)				

== 1971–1978 Camden council elections ==
There was a revision of ward boundaries in Camden in 1971. For elections to the Greater London Council, Belsize was part of the Hampstead electoral division from 1973.

=== 1976 by-election ===
The by-election took place on 25 March 1976, following the resignation of Richard Arthur.

1976 Belsize by-election
Party	Candidate	Votes	%	±%
Conservative	Martin Morton	2,196		
Labour	David Walker	1,455		
Liberal	Mary De La Mahotiere	251		
Turnout			37.5	
Conservative gain from Labour		Swing		

=== 1974 election ===
The election took place on 2 May 1974.

1974 Camden London Borough Council election: Belsize
Party	Candidate	Votes	%	±%
Labour	Richard Arthur	2,010	43.1	
Labour	David Mills	1,951		
Labour	Richard Ford	1,915		
Labour	Bernard Taylor	1,898		
Conservative	Julian Harrison	1,847	39.6	
Conservative	Arthur Roome	1,815		
Conservative	Timothy Coghlan	1,801		
Conservative	Peter Grosz	1,773		
Liberal	Margaret Darvall	539	11.6	
Liberal	Richard Franklin	465		
Communist	Hubert Bevan	264	5.7	
Turnout				
Labour hold		Swing		
Labour hold		Swing		
Labour hold		Swing		
Labour hold		Swing		

=== 1971 election ===
The election took place on 13 May 1971.

1971 Camden London Borough Council election: Belsize
Party	Candidate	Votes	%	±%
Labour	Jill Gibson	2,225		
Labour	John Lipetz	2,132		
Labour	Bernard Taylor	2,130		
Labour	Irving Kuczynski	2,128		
Conservative	Norman Oatway	1,955		
Conservative	Irene Burnett	1,943		
Conservative	Julian Harrison	1,923		
Conservative	Peter Hilton	1,885		
Liberal	Margaret Darvall	352		
Liberal	Mary De La Mahotiere	313		
Communist	Hubert Bevan	292		
Liberal	John Swain	282		
Association of Independents	John Davies	92		
Association of Independents	Anthony Cunnew	74		
Association of Independents	Mary Davies	60		
Turnout				
Labour gain from Conservative		Swing		
Labour gain from Conservative		Swing		
Labour gain from Conservative		Swing		
Labour gain from Conservative		Swing		

== 1964–1971 Camden council elections ==
External image
- Belsize ward boundaries from 1965 to 1971

Belsize ward has existed since the creation of the London Borough of Camden on 1 April 1965. For elections to the Greater London Council it was part of the Camden electoral division from 1965.

=== 1968 election ===
The election took place on 9 May 1968.

1968 Camden London Borough Council election: Belsize
Party	Candidate	Votes	%	±%
Conservative	Kenneth Evans	2,355	56.9	
Conservative	Irene Burnett	2,346		
Conservative	Norman Oatway	2,345		
Conservative	Julian Harrison	2,328		
Labour	Edwin Lichtenstein	1,330	31.8	
Labour	Joseph Hughes	1,322		
Labour	William Kellock	1,308		
Labour	Arthur Soutter	1,279		
Liberal	Tristram Adams	488	11.3	
Liberal	Margaret Darvall	472		
Liberal	Angela Whitelegge	448		
Liberal	Gerald Dowden	445		
Turnout			37.6	
Conservative hold		Swing		
Conservative hold		Swing		
Conservative hold		Swing		
Conservative hold		Swing		

=== 1964 election ===
The election took place on 7 May 1964.

1964 Camden London Borough Council election: Belsize
Party	Candidate	Votes	%	±%
Conservative	Norman Oatway	2,045		
Conservative	Stanley Duncan	2,028		
Conservative	Irene Burnett	2,015		
Conservative	Leslie Room	2,009		
Labour	Lyndal Evans	1,651		
Labour	Sheila Oakes	1,649		
Labour	Bernard Taylor	1,616		
Labour	Arthur Soutter	1,585		
Liberal	Margaret Darvall	585		
Liberal	Percy Anderson	575		
Liberal	G. Willett	571		
Liberal	Doris Watson	564		
Communist	Timothy Webb	146		
Turnout		4,311	39.6	
Conservative win (new seat)				
Conservative win (new seat)				
Conservative win (new seat)				
Conservative win (new seat)				
