= Samuel Fisher, Baron Fisher of Camden =

British businessman and politician

Samuel Fisher, Baron Fisher of Camden (20 January 1905 – 12 October 1979) was a British businessman, local politician and leading member of the Jewish community.

Fisher was born in Stepney in the East End of London as Samuel Fishtenberg, the son of Eastern European immigrants. He left school to start work at the age of 15, eventually entering the diamond business as a broker in the Hatton Garden area. He rose to become Secretary and Vice-President of the London Diamond Bourse.

In 1945 he entered local politics as a Labour Party member of Stoke Newington Borough Council, and served as Mayor of Stoke Newington in 1953–54. He became a JP for Inner London in 1951. When Camden London Borough Council was created as a shadow authority in 1964 he was its Chairman, and was chosen as the first Mayor of Camden in 1965–1966. He was the last chairman of the Metropolitan Water Board in 1973–1974.

Fisher was prominent in lay organisations representing Jewry: he was president of the Board of Deputies of British Jews from 1973 to 1979, and was Chairman of the Governing Board of the World Jewish Congress at the time of his death.

Fisher was knighted in 1967. He was created a life peer as Baron Fisher of Camden, of Camden in Greater London in 1974. He married Millie Gluckstein in 1930: they had two daughters.
