= 2006 Camden London Borough Council election =

2006 Camden Council election
- 4 May 2006

All 54 seats to Camden London Borough Council 27 seats needed for a majority
	First party	Second party
Leader	Keith Moffitt	Raj Chada
Party	Liberal Democrats	Labour
Leader since	2005	2005
Leader's seat	West Hampstead	Gospel Oak (lost)
Last election	8 seats, 23.2%	35 seats, 33.3%
Seats won	20	18
Seat change	▲12	▼17
Popular vote	16,241	16,940
Percentage	27.8%	29.0%
Swing	▲4.6%	▼4.3%
	Third party	Fourth party
Leader	Piers Wauchope
Party	Conservative	Green
Leader since	2000
Leader's seat	Belsize (lost)
Last election	11 seats, 25.2%	0 seats, 13.6%
Seats won	14	2
Seat change	▲3	▲2
Popular vote	15,187	8,652
Percentage	26.0%	14.8%
Swing	▲0.8%	▲1.2%
- Map of the results of the 2006 Camden council election. Liberal Democrats in yellow, Labour in red, Conservatives in blue and Green Party in green.
Leader before election
Raj Chada
Labour
Leader
Keith Moffitt
Liberal Democrats

The 2006 Camden Council election took place on 4 May 2006 to elect members of Camden London Borough Council in London, England. The whole council was up for election and the Labour Party lost overall control of the council to no overall control.

== Background ==
Before the election the Labour party controlled the council with 36 seats, compared to 11 Conservatives and 7 Liberal Democrats. Since the 2002 election, in 2005, one of the councillors for Fortune Green, Jonathan Simpson, had defected from the Liberal Democrats to Labour.

A total of 223 candidates stood for the 54 seats being contested in 18 wards. The Labour, Conservative, Liberal Democrat and Green parties contested every seat and there was 1 candidate each from the Christian Peoples Alliance, Respect Party and United Kingdom Independence Party, as well as 4 independents.

Labour Prime Minister Tony Blair visited Camden during the campaign to support his party.

== Election result ==
The results saw Labour lose their majority on the council with the leader of the council Raj Chada among those who were defeated. This was the first time since the 1968 election that Labour had not won a majority in Camden and the election saw the Liberal Democrats overtake Labour to become the largest party on the council. The defeated Labour leader of the council Raj Chadha said "that the national circumstances meant a very good council in Camden has been lost". Overall turnout at the election was 37.6%, an increase from 28.5% in 2002.

Following the election the Liberal Democrats and Conservatives made an agreement to form the administration together, with Liberal Democrat Keith Moffitt becoming the leader of the council and Conservative Andrew Marshall becoming deputy leader.

Camden local election result 2006
Party	Seats	Gains	Losses	Net gain/loss	Seats %	Votes %	Votes	+/−
Labour	18			-17	33.3	29.0	16,940	-4.3
Liberal Democrats	20			+12	37.0	27.8	16,241	+4.6
Conservative	14			+3	25.9	26.0	15,187	+0.8
Green	2			+2	3.7	14.8	8,652	+1.2
Respect	0			0	0	1.3	781	n/a
Independent	0			0	0	0.8	468	-1.1
UKIP	0			0	0	0.1	63	n/a
CPA	0			0	0	0.0	25	-0.7

== Ward results ==
Existing Councillor seeking re-election is denoted by an asterisk (*).

=== Belsize ===
Belsize (3)
Party	Candidate	Votes	%	±%
Liberal Democrats	Alexis Rowell	1,358	40.8	+22.7
Liberal Democrats	Christopher Basson	1,349	40.5	+24.0
Liberal Democrats	Arthur Graves	1,268	38.1	+21.8
Conservative	Jonathan Bucknell *	1,233	37.1	−3.0
Conservative	Piers Wauchope *	1,205	36.2	−2.5
Conservative	Sheila Gunn *	1,187	35.7	−3.4
Labour	Sadashivrao Deshmukh	471	14.2	−13.4
Labour	Matthew McGregor	462	13.9	−15.8
Labour	Jenny Westaway	410	12.3	−14.3
Green	Jane Ennis	278	8.4	−2.2
Green	Anya Courts	260	7.8	−1.3
Green	Adam Spanier	207	6.2	−2.2
Turnout		9,688	38.3	
Liberal Democrats gain from Conservative		Swing		
Liberal Democrats gain from Conservative		Swing		
Liberal Democrats gain from Conservative		Swing		

=== Bloomsbury ===
Bloomsbury (3)
Party	Candidate	Votes	%	±%
Labour	Penelope Abraham *	1,004	39.6	+1.3
Labour	Fazlul Chowdhury *	928	36.6	−0.9
Conservative	Rebecca Hossack	898	35.4	+3.5
Labour	Peter Brayshaw *	896	35.4	−1.1
Conservative	Robert Moritt	835	33.0	+1.4
Conservative	Janice Lavery	634	25.0	−6.5
Green	Linus Rees	353	13.9	+0.9
Liberal Democrats	Caroline Deys	344	13.6	−3.0
Green	Shahrar Ali	329	13.0	+5.8
Liberal Democrats	Steven Deller	323	12.7	−1.4
Green	George Graham	284	11.2	+4.4
Liberal Democrats	Philip Moser	282	11.1	−3.5
Independent	Andrew Halsey	53	2.1	N/A
Turnout		7,348	37.6	
Labour hold		Swing		
Labour hold		Swing		
Conservative gain from Labour		Swing		

=== Camden Town with Primrose Hill ===
Camden Town with Primrose Hill (3)
Party	Candidate	Votes	%	±%
Liberal Democrats	Christopher Naylor	1,367	38.4	+8.8
Labour	Pat Callaghan *	1,357	38.1	+0.2
Liberal Democrats	Elizabeth Campbell	1,357	38.1	+16.6
Liberal Democrats	John Lefley	1,293	36.3	+12.5
Labour	Jake Sumner *	1,186	33.3	+4.8
Labour	Abdul Quadir	1,152	32.4	−3.5
Conservative	William Mitchell	527	14.8	−6.0
Conservative	Jesse Norman	501	14.1	−6.3
Conservative	Peter Horne	497	14.0	−5.7
Green	Nicola Chatham	414	11.6	−2.4
Green	Vincent Thurgood	356	10.0	+1.7
Green	Hilary Wendt	313	8.8	+0.8
Turnout		10,320	42.1	
Liberal Democrats gain from Labour		Swing		
Labour hold		Swing		
Liberal Democrats gain from Labour		Swing		

=== Cantelowes ===
Cantelowes (3)
Party	Candidate	Votes	%	±%
Liberal Democrats	Paul Braithwaite	1,193	41.0	+19.4
Liberal Democrats	Benjamin Rawlings	1,129	38.8	+18.7
Liberal Democrats	Frederic Carver	1,101	37.9	+21.7
Labour	John Doolan	923	31.8	−13.6
Labour	Dermot Greene *	891	30.7	−15.3
Labour	Hilary Lowe	884	30.4	−11.2
Green	Elizabeth Wilson	497	17.1	−1.5
Green	Francesca Bury	440	15.1	−2.5
Green	Rachel Zatz	380	13.1	−4.9
Conservative	Judith Barnes	372	12.8	−0.4
Conservative	Richard Dollimore	334	11.5	−1.6
Conservative	Carole Ricketts	305	10.5	−2.2
Turnout		8,449	35.3	
Liberal Democrats gain from Labour		Swing		
Liberal Democrats gain from Labour		Swing		
Liberal Democrats gain from Labour		Swing		

=== Fortune Green ===
Fortune Green (3)
Party	Candidate	Votes	%	±%
Liberal Democrats	Flick Rea *	1,446	52.7	−8.1
Liberal Democrats	Jane Schopflin *	1,187	43.2	−9.4
Liberal Democrats	Russell Eagling	1,132	41.2	−10.9
Conservative	Heather Downham	667	24.3	+8.5
Conservative	Jean Hornbuckle	608	22.1	+7.4
Labour	Miles Seaman	580	21.1	−1.6
Conservative	Peter Denison-Pender	576	21.0	+5.8
Labour	Howard Dawber	545	19.9	+0.5
Labour	Mohamoud Nur	402	14.6	−4.6
Green	Billy Murray	354	12.9	+2.5
Green	Lucia Nella	305	11.1	+1.8
Green	Benjamin Smith	291	10.6	+4.4
Turnout		8,093	34.6	
Liberal Democrats hold		Swing		
Liberal Democrats hold		Swing		
Liberal Democrats gain from Labour		Swing		

=== Frognal and Fitzjohns ===
Frognal and Fitzjohns (3)
Party	Candidate	Votes	%	±%
Conservative	Martin Davies *	1,603	61.0	+4.2
Conservative	Dawn Somper *	1,513	57.6	+1.9
Conservative	Andrew Mennear *	1,500	57.1	+1.7
Liberal Democrats	Diane Litman	453	17.3	−0.7
Liberal Democrats	Alan Templeton	394	15.0	−1.6
Labour	Thomas Gardiner	364	13.9	−5.2
Labour	Peter Sanderson	353	13.4	−3.7
Liberal Democrats	Erich Wagner	342	13.0	−1.2
Green	Charles Harris	331	12.6	+5.5
Labour	Luca Salice	316	12.0	−4.7
Green	Edward Ross	296	11.3	+3.6
Green	Tatton Spiller	267	10.2	+2.6
Turnout		7,732	32.2	
Conservative hold		Swing		
Conservative hold		Swing		
Conservative hold		Swing		

=== Gospel Oak ===
Gospel Oak (3)
Party	Candidate	Votes	%	±%
Conservative	Lulu Mitchell	1,378	39.4	+13.8
Conservative	Chris Philp	1,333	38.1	+15.6
Conservative	Keith Sedgwick	1,297	37.1	+15.7
Labour	Sally Gimson	1,225	35.0	−1.8
Labour	Raj Chada *	1,220	34.9	−4.5
Labour	Janet Guthrie *	1,150	32.9	−8.0
Liberal Democrats	Margaret Jackson-Roberts	519	14.8	−5.2
Liberal Democrats	Laura Noel	461	13.2	−2.9
Green	Josephine Karen	428	12.2	−1.3
Green	Jane Walby	411	11.8	−2.7
Liberal Democrats	Herbert Newbrook	373	10.7	−4.9
Green	Richard Thomas	337	9.6	−2.7
Turnout		10,132	45.9	
Conservative gain from Labour		Swing		
Conservative gain from Labour		Swing		
Conservative gain from Labour		Swing		

=== Hampstead Town ===
Hampstead Town (3)
Party	Candidate	Votes	%	±%
Conservative	Mike Greene *	1,842	50.8	+5.1
Conservative	Kirsty Roberts	1,641	45.3	+7.5
Conservative	Christopher Knight	1,605	44.3	+7.3
Liberal Democrats	Ed Fordham	1,293	35.7	−2.7
Liberal Democrats	Linda Chung	1,204	33.2	−0.6
Liberal Democrats	Jonathan Fryer	980	27.0	−0.8
Labour	Hugh Gracey	446	12.3	−2.6
Labour	Myra Carr	418	11.5	−1.4
Labour	Paul Tomlinson	384	10.6	−1.4
Green	Brian Gascoigne	328	9.1	−3.0
Green	Charlotte Collins	287	7.9	−3.2
Green	Una Sapietis	214	5.9	−5.1
Independent	Brian Kettell	52	1.4	−36.4
Turnout		10,694	49.2	
Conservative hold		Swing		
Conservative gain from Liberal Democrats		Swing		
Conservative hold		Swing		

=== Haverstock ===
Haverstock (3)
Party	Candidate	Votes	%	±%
Liberal Democrats	Jill Fraser *	1,417	46.0	+23.4
Labour	Syed Hoque	1,118	36.3	−11.0
Labour	Roy Shaw *	1,106	35.9	−10.0
Liberal Democrats	Dudley Miles	1,085	35.3	+15.8
Liberal Democrats	Simon Horvat-Marcovic	1,058	34.4	+15.1
Labour	Mike Katz	1,034	33.6	−12.1
Conservative	Joan Stally	362	11.8	−7.9
Green	Sue Charlesworth	351	11.4	−5.7
Green	Robert Bahns	347	11.3	−3.6
Conservative	Timothy Frost	338	11.0	−8.0
Conservative	Ross McGregor	337	10.9	−7.9
Green	Edward Milford	244	7.9	−2.9
Turnout		8,797	38.3	
Liberal Democrats gain from Labour		Swing		
Labour hold		Swing		
Labour hold		Swing		

=== Highgate ===
Highgate (3)
Party	Candidate	Votes	%	±%
Green	Maya De Souza	1,336	35.3	+8.4
Conservative	Paul Barton	1,221	32.3	+5.3
Green	Adrian Oliver	1,210	32.0	+6.5
Green	Quentin Tyler	1,159	30.7	+7.0
Conservative	Gary Benardout	1,129	29.9	+3.7
Conservative	Richard Merrin	1,121	29.6	+3.9
Labour	Maggie Cosin *	1,016	26.9	−5.4
Labour	George Queen	922	24.4	−3.8
Labour	John Thane *	873	23.1	−5.5
Liberal Democrats	Henry Potts	406	10.7	−0.3
Liberal Democrats	Laura Watkins	356	9.4	−3.4
Liberal Democrats	Philip Wainewright	325	8.6	−3.9
Turnout		11,074	47.5	
Green gain from Labour		Swing		
Conservative gain from Labour		Swing		
Green gain from Labour		Swing		

=== Holborn and Covent Garden ===
Holborn and Covent Garden (3)
Party	Candidate	Votes	%	±%
Labour	Sue Vincent *	1,085	40.1	−5.9
Labour	Julian Fulbrook *	1,079	39.9	−8.3
Labour	Brian Woodrow *	988	36.5	−8.3
Conservative	Alison Frost	810	29.9	+7.1
Conservative	Timothy Barnes	758	28.0	+7.2
Conservative	Philip Nelson	731	27.0	+7.3
Liberal Democrats	Elizabeth Hanna	489	18.1	+1.3
Green	Benedict Protheroe	449	16.6	+3.7
Liberal Democrats	Stanley Grossman	417	15.4	−0.1
Green	Grace Hodgkinson-Barrett	364	13.5	+0.7
Liberal Democrats	Simieon Litman	347	12.8	+0.1
Green	Stuart Houghton	319	11.8	+1.4
Turnout		7,836	31.7	
Labour hold		Swing		
Labour hold		Swing		
Labour hold		Swing		

=== Kentish Town ===
Kentish Town (3)
Party	Candidate	Votes	%	±%
Liberal Democrats	Philip Thompson	1,421	38.9	+10.0
Liberal Democrats	Omar Ansari	1,268	34.7	+6.6
Labour	Lucy Anderson *	1,213	33.2	−7.9
Liberal Democrats	Ralph Scott	1,198	32.8	+9.6
Labour	David Horan *	1,087	29.7	−7.4
Green	Siân Berry	1,057	28.9	+11.1
Labour	Deidre Krymer*	1,042	28.5	−5.6
Green	Edward Chatham	772	21.1	+6.2
Green	Alexander Goodman	760	20.8	+6.2
Conservative	Matthew Murphy	308	8.4	−1.1
Conservative	Doreen Bartlett	306	8.4	−1.2
Conservative	Graham Porter	271	7.4	−0.2
Turnout		10,703	41.8	
Liberal Democrats gain from Labour		Swing		
Liberal Democrats gain from Labour		Swing		
Labour hold		Swing		

=== Kilburn ===
Kilburn (3)
Party	Candidate	Votes	%	±%
Liberal Democrats	David Abrahams	1,122	40.4	+23.9
Liberal Democrats	Janet Grauberg	1,084	39.0	+24.3
Liberal Democrats	James King	1,071	38.5	+25.4
Labour	Aileen Hammond	1,008	36.3	−10.4
Labour	John Rolfe *	1,005	36.2	−10.0
Labour	Phil Turner *	985	35.4	−9.2
Conservative	Andrew Cossar	393	14.1	−5.8
Conservative	Carlo Banchero	382	13.7	−3.7
Conservative	Sam Gyimah	336	12.1	−4.6
Green	John Collins	224	8.1	−3.8
Green	Sophia Mustoe	214	7.7	−4.8
Green	Miriam Elkan	188	6.8	−3.1
Turnout		8,012	34.7	
Liberal Democrats gain from Labour		Swing		
Liberal Democrats gain from Labour		Swing		
Liberal Democrats gain from Labour		Swing		

=== King's Cross ===
King's Cross (3)
Party	Candidate	Votes	%	±%
Labour	Abdul Hai	1,071	41.4	−10.9
Labour	Jonathan Simpson	956	37.0	−6.4
Labour	Geethika Jayatilaka *	946	36.6	−8.0
Liberal Democrats	Trevor Harris	662	25.6	+6.7
Liberal Democrats	Huw Prior	627	24.2	+9.3
Liberal Democrats	David Simmons	600	23.2	+10.0
Conservative	Barbara Douglass	483	18.7	−2.7
Conservative	Paul Christian	476	18.4	−2.6
Conservative	Jamieson Hunkin	424	16.4	−3.0
Green	Joy Wood	375	14.5	+4.2
Green	Kate Gordon	360	13.9	+4.3
Green	Neil Endicott	355	13.7	+4.6
Independent	Alem-Seged Abay	182	7.0	N/A
Turnout		7,517	31.3	
Labour hold		Swing		
Labour hold		Swing		
Labour hold		Swing		

=== Regent's Park ===
Regent's Park (3)
Party	Candidate	Votes	%	±%
Labour	Nasim Ali *	1,329	42.4	−6.0
Labour	Theo Blackwell *	1,204	38.4	−7.1
Labour	Heather Johnson *	1,172	37.4	−7.3
Conservative	Michele Potel	814	26.0	−2.4
Conservative	James Morris	804	25.6	−1.6
Conservative	John Iredale	792	25.3	−0.7
Green	Natalie Bennett	616	19.6	−4.7
Liberal Democrats	Anne Brown	586	18.7	+4.1
Green	Stephen Plowden	463	14.8	−8.0
Green	Joel Derbyshire	434	13.8	−5.6
Liberal Democrats	Lawrence Nicholson	424	13.5	+2.7
Liberal Democrats	Richard Waddington	330	10.5	−0.3
Turnout		8,968	36.8	
Labour hold		Swing		
Labour hold		Swing		
Labour hold		Swing		

=== St Pancras and Somers Town ===
St Pancras and Somers Town (3)
Party	Candidate	Votes	%	±%
Labour	Roger Robinson *	1,399	45.1	−7.9
Labour	Nural Islam	1,264	40.7	−9.1
Labour	Ruth Stewart *	1,212	39.1	−8.6
Respect	Nuruzzaman Hira	781	25.2	N/A
Green	Beatrix Campbell	517	16.7	+4.6
Conservative	Rohit Grover	440	14.2	−0.3
Liberal Democrats	Margaret Finer	433	14.0	−6.9
Conservative	Robert Ricketts	429	13.8	−0.5
Conservative	Abdul Salam	422	13.6	−0.1
Green	Richard Eden	369	11.9	+5.1
Liberal Democrats	Charles Marquand	332	10.7	−8.8
Liberal Democrats	Barbara Waddington	317	10.2	−9.1
Green	Matthew Hodgkinson-Barrett	213	6.9	+0.5
Independent	Robert Austin	181	5.8	N/A
Turnout		8,309	39.0	
Labour hold		Swing		
Labour hold		Swing		
Labour hold		Swing		

=== Swiss Cottage ===
Swiss Cottage (3)
Party	Candidate	Votes	%	±%
Conservative	Andrew Marshall *	1,292	46.3	−2.3
Conservative	Roger Freeman	1,272	45.6	−6.1
Conservative	Don Williams *	1,243	44.6	−3.3
Labour	Katharine Bligh	659	23.6	+1.6
Labour	Selman Ansari	638	22.9	+1.6
Liberal Democrats	Jillian Newbrook	543	19.5	+1.1
Labour	Charles Keal	522	18.7	−1.8
Green	Elizabeth Charvet	435	15.6	+7.9
Liberal Democrats	Harriet Sloane	405	14.5	−3.8
Liberal Democrats	Sally Twite	400	14.3	−2.9
Green	Lucy Wills	355	12.7	+1.0
Green	Alan Wheatley	255	9.1	+2.6
UKIP	Magnus Nielsen	63	2.3	+0.7
CPA	Alphonse Komesha	25	0.9	N/A
Turnout		8,107	32.0	
Conservative hold		Swing		
Conservative hold		Swing		
Conservative hold		Swing		

=== West Hampstead ===
West Hampstead (3)
Party	Candidate	Votes	%	±%
Liberal Democrats	Keith Moffitt *	1,189	46.3	−7.2
Liberal Democrats	John Bryant *	1,107	41.7	−6.9
Liberal Democrats	Duncan Greenland	974	37.9	−10.1
Labour	Virginia Berridge	672	26.2	−0.6
Labour	Geoffrey Kingscote	598	23.3	−0.7
Labour	Charles Hedges	545	21.2	−1.0
Conservative	Elaine Mackover	544	21.2	+8.5
Conservative	John Samiotis	478	18.6	+7.3
Conservative	Marcus Watzlaff	451	17.6	+5.0
Green	Lucy Thomas	309	12.0	−0.1
Green	Debra Green	300	11.7	+3.5
Green	Kari-Lourdes Dewar	275	10.7	+3.0
Turnout		7,442	31.2	
Liberal Democrats hold		Swing		
Liberal Democrats hold		Swing		
Liberal Democrats hold		Swing		
