= 2002 Camden London Borough Council election =

2002 Camden Council election
- 2 May 2002

All 54 seats to Camden Borough Council 27 seats needed for a majority
	First party	Second party	Third party
Leader	Jane Roberts	Piers Wauchope	Flick Rea
Party	Labour	Conservative	Liberal Democrats
Leader since	2000	2000	1988
Leader's seat	Haverstock	Belsize	Fortune Green
Last election	43 seats, 44.0%	10 seats, 23.3%	6 seats, 23.1%
Seats won	35	11	8
Seat change	▼8	▲1	▲2
Popular vote	14,238	10,783	9,904
Percentage	33.3%	25.2%	23.2%
Swing	▼10.7%	▲1.9%	▲0.1%
- Map of the results of the 2002 Camden council election. Labour in red, Conservatives in blue and Liberal Democrats in yellow.
Leader before election
Jane Roberts
Labour
Leader
Jane Roberts
Labour

The 2002 Camden Council election took place on 2 May 2002 to elect members of Camden London Borough Council in London, England. The whole council was up for election with boundary changes since the last election in 1998 reducing the number of seats by 5. The Labour party stayed in overall control of the council.

== Election result ==
For the election Camden had a trial of early voting on 27–28 April in an attempt to increase turnout, however overall turnout at 28.4% was down on the 33.4% in 1998.

Camden local election result 2002
Party	Seats	Gains	Losses	Net gain/loss	Seats %	Votes %	Votes	+/−
Labour	35			-8	64.8	33.3	14,238	-10.7
Conservative	11			+1	20.4	25.2	10,783	+1.9
Liberal Democrats	8			+2	14.8	23.2	9,904	+0.1
Green	0			0	0	13.6	5,813	+6.9
Socialist Alliance	0			0	0	2.2	931	n/a
Independent	0			0	0	1.9	813	+0.4
CPA	0			0	0	0.7	279	n/a

== Ward results ==
=== Belsize ===
Belsize (3)
Party	Candidate	Votes	%	±%
Conservative	Jonny Bucknell	1,041	40.1	
Conservative	Sheila Gunn	1,016	39.1	
Conservative	Piers Wauchope	1,005	38.7	
Labour	Aileen Hammond *	770	29.7	
Labour	Sadashivrao Deshmukh	716	27.6	
Labour	Patricia Nightingale	691	26.6	
Liberal Democrats	Pauline Marriott	469	18.1	
Liberal Democrats	Ardon Lyon	429	16.5	
Liberal Democrats	Dudley Miles	423	16.3	
Green	Phyllis Eyres	274	10.6	
Green	Jack Price	236	9.1	
Green	Maeve Tornero	219	8.4	
Turnout		7,289		

=== Bloomsbury ===
Bloomsbury (3)
Party	Candidate	Votes	%	±%
Labour	Penelope Abraham	771	38.3	
Labour	Fazlul Chowdhury	756	37.5	
Labour	Peter Brayshaw	736	36.5	
Conservative	Adam Lester	642	31.9	
Conservative	Rohit Grover	636	31.6	
Conservative	Peter Horne	634	31.5	
Liberal Democrats	Adam Edwards	335	16.6	
Liberal Democrats	Philip Moser	295	14.6	
Liberal Democrats	John Ward	285	14.1	
Green	Lucy Thomas	262	13.0	
Green	Sally Zlotowitz	145	7.2	
Green	Marcus Petz	137	6.8	
Socialist Alliance	Janet Maiden	125	6.2	
Turnout		5,759		

=== Camden Town with Primrose Hill ===
Camden Town with Primrose Hill (3)
Party	Candidate	Votes	%	±%
Labour	Pat Callaghan	1,041	37.9	
Labour	Harriet Garland	986	35.9	
Liberal Democrats	Justin Barnard	812	29.6	
Labour	Jake Sumner	782	28.5	
Liberal Democrats	John Lefley	653	23.8	
Independent	Gloria Lazenby	603	22.0	
Liberal Democrats	Toby Wickenden	591	21.5	
Conservative	William Mitchell	570	20.8	
Conservative	Peter Grosvenor	560	20.4	
Conservative	Paul Barton	541	19.7	
Green	Danielle Rappaport	385	14.0	
Green	Juliana Venter	227	8.3	
Green	Beryl Lankester	220	8.0	
CPA	Elsa Dos Santos	34	1.2	
Turnout		8,005		

=== Cantelowes ===
Cantelowes (3)
Party	Candidate	Votes	%	±%
Labour	Dermot Greene	861	46.0	
Labour	Gerald Harrison	850	45.4	
Labour	Judith Pattison	779	41.6	
Liberal Democrats	Soren Agerholm	404	21.6	
Liberal Democrats	Gerald Wall	377	20.1	
Green	Gaie Houston	348	18.6	
Green	Rachel Zatz	337	18.0	
Green	Rob Whitley	329	17.6	
Liberal Democrats	Simeon Litman	303	16.2	
Conservative	Sylvia Currie	247	13.2	
Conservative	Marcus Lloyd-Davy	245	13.1	
Conservative	Oliver Milne	237	12.7	
Turnout		5,320		

=== Fortune Green ===
Fortune Green (3)
Party	Candidate	Votes	%	±%
Liberal Democrats	Flick Rea	1,295	60.8	
Liberal Democrats	Jane Schopflin	1,121	52.6	
Liberal Democrats	Jonathan Simpson	1,111	52.1	
Labour	Mike Katz	483	22.7	
Labour	Geoffrey Kingscote	414	19.4	
Labour	Miles Seaman	409	19.2	
Conservative	Richard Arthur	336	15.8	
Conservative	Esther Baroudy	323	15.2	
Conservative	Jean Hornbuckle	314	14.7	
Green	David Sunderland	221	10.4	
Green	Susan Craig	199	9.3	
Green	Stephen Dawe	132	6.2	
Turnout		6,358		

=== Frognal and Fitzjohns ===
Frognal and Fitzjohns (3)
Party	Candidate	Votes	%	±%
Conservative	Martin Davies	1,141	56.8	
Conservative	Dawn Somper	1,119	55.7	
Conservative	Andrew Mennear	1,114	55.4	
Labour	Deborah Townsend	384	19.1	
Liberal Democrats	Susan Garden	362	18.0	
Labour	Alfred Lawrie	344	17.1	
Labour	Francis McGrath	336	16.7	
Liberal Democrats	Dominic Curran	333	16.6	
Liberal Democrats	Charles Keidan	286	14.2	
Green	Lynn Lovell	155	7.7	
Green	Stuart Houghton	153	7.6	
Green	Charles Harris	143	7.1	
Turnout		5,870		

=== Gospel Oak ===
Gospel Oak (3)
Party	Candidate	Votes	%	±%
Labour	Janet Guthrie	880	40.9	
Labour	Raj Chada	846	39.4	
Labour	John Mills	791	36.8	
Conservative	Lindsay Mitchell	550	25.6	
Conservative	Richard Millett	506	23.5	
Conservative	Carole Ricketts	459	21.4	
Liberal Democrats	Margaret Jackson-Roberts	430	20.0	
Liberal Democrats	Peter Mair	347	16.1	
Liberal Democrats	Jeffrey Poulter	336	15.6	
Green	Jane Walby	311	14.5	
Green	Howard Edmunds	291	13.5	
Green	Lesley Robb	264	12.3	
CPA	Humberto Heliotrope	50	2.3	
Turnout		6,076		

=== Hampstead Town ===
Hampstead Town (3)
Party	Candidate	Votes	%	±%
Conservative	Mike Greene	1,316	45.7	
Liberal Democrats	Margaret Little	1,106	38.4	
Conservative	Brian Cattell	1,089	37.8	
Conservative	Katharine Steel	1,064	37.0	
Liberal Democrats	Louise Malin	974	33.8	
Liberal Democrats	Martin Wright	800	27.8	
Labour	Neil Crundwell	430	14.9	
Labour	Harunur Rashid	372	12.9	
Green	Brian Gascoigne	349	12.1	
Labour	Mohammed Islam	345	12.0	
Green	Frances Mortimer	321	11.1	
Green	Dorothy Forsyth	316	11.0	
Turnout		8,482		

=== Haverstock ===
Haverstock (3)
Party	Candidate	Votes	%	±%
Labour	Jane Roberts	882	47.3	
Labour	Roy Shaw	856	45.9	
Labour	John Dickie	852	45.7	
Liberal Democrats	Margaret Finer	422	22.6	
Conservative	Rita Marshall	367	19.7	
Liberal Democrats	Alec Gordon	364	19.5	
Liberal Democrats	Pamela Lutgen	359	19.3	
Conservative	Anthony Kemp	355	19.0	
Conservative	Joan Stally	351	18.8	
Green	Sarah Gillam	319	17.1	
Green	Iola Kenworthy	277	14.9	
Green	Edward Milford	201	10.8	
CPA	Angela Ozor	34	1.8	
Turnout		5,639		

=== Highgate ===
Highgate (3)
Party	Candidate	Votes	%	±%
Labour	Margaret Cosin	972	32.3	
Labour	John Thane	861	28.6	
Labour	Abdul Quadir	849	28.2	
Conservative	Roger Freeman	813	27.0	
Green	Siân Berry	811	26.9	
Conservative	Simon Baker	790	26.2	
Conservative	Janice Lavery	775	25.7	
Green	Adrian Oliver	768	25.5	
Green	Mark Smith	715	23.7	
Liberal Democrats	Alison Wheeler	384	12.8	
Liberal Democrats	Richard Waddington	376	12.5	
Liberal Democrats	Henry Potts	332	11.0	
Socialist Alliance	Sean Thompson	219	7.3	
Turnout		8,665		

=== Holborn and Covent Garden ===
Holborn and Covent Garden (3)
Party	Candidate	Votes	%	±%
Labour	Julian Fulbrook	950	48.2	
Labour	Sue Vincent	908	46.0	
Labour	Brian Woodrow	884	44.8	
Conservative	Patsy Prince	449	22.8	
Conservative	Dominic Valder	411	20.8	
Conservative	Robert Ricketts	389	19.7	
Liberal Democrats	Eleanor Key	331	16.8	
Liberal Democrats	Alastir Loraine	305	15.5	
Green	Nicholas Duckett	255	12.9	
Green	Seanine Joyce	253	12.8	
Liberal Democrats	Herbert Newbrook	251	12.7	
Green	Hugo Charlton	205	10.4	
Turnout		5,591		

=== Kentish Town ===
Kentish Town (3)
Party	Candidate	Votes	%	±%
Labour	Lucy Anderson	961	41.1	
Labour	David Horan	868	37.1	
Labour	Deidre Krymer	797	34.1	
Liberal Democrats	Jill Fraser	676	28.9	
Liberal Democrats	Alice Brown	658	28.1	
Liberal Democrats	Nathaniel Green	543	23.2	
Green	Sue Charlesworth	415	17.8	
Socialist Alliance	Alan Walter	376	16.1	
Green	Kate Gordon	348	14.9	
Green	Graeme Durham	342	14.6	
Conservative	Doreen Bartlett	224	9.6	
Conservative	Anthony Blackburn	222	9.5	
Conservative	Alan Coleman-Harvey	177	7.6	
CPA	Celia Heliotrope	42	1.8	
Turnout		6,649		

=== Kilburn ===
Kilburn (3)
Party	Candidate	Votes	%	±%
Labour	Charlie Hedges	806	46.7	
Labour	John Rolfe	797	46.2	
Labour	Phil Turner	770	44.6	
Conservative	Robert Graham	343	19.9	
Conservative	Rosette Irwin	301	17.4	
Conservative	Paul Mawdsley	289	16.7	
Liberal Democrats	Jeremy Allen	285	16.5	
Liberal Democrats	Sally Twite	254	14.7	
Liberal Democrats	Daviyani Kothari	226	13.1	
Green	Helen Mayer	215	12.5	
Green	John Collins	205	11.9	
Independent	David Reed	174	10.1	
Green	Debra Green	171	9.9	
CPA	Maria McCarten	73	4.2	
Turnout		4,909		

=== King's Cross ===
King's Cross (3)
Party	Candidate	Votes	%	±%
Labour	Barbara Hughes	855	52.3	
Labour	Geethika Jayatilaka	730	44.6	
Labour	Nick Smith	710	43.4	
Conservative	Barbara Douglass	353	21.6	
Conservative	Charles Costa	344	21.0	
Conservative	Mark Haley	318	19.4	
Liberal Democrats	Diana Brown	310	18.9	
Liberal Democrats	Nicholas Tucker	243	14.9	
Liberal Democrats	Erich Wagner	216	13.2	
Green	Richard Thomas	169	10.3	
Green	Audrey Poppy	157	9.6	
Green	Lucia Nella	149	9.1	
CPA	Elsa Pontes-Betee	46	2.8	
Turnout		4,600		

=== Regent's Park ===
Regent's Park (3)
Party	Candidate	Votes	%	±%
Labour	Nasim Ali	1,165	48.4	
Labour	Theo Blackwell	1,095	45.5	
Labour	Heather Johnson	1,076	44.7	
Conservative	Abdul Salam	685	28.4	
Conservative	Sara Haydon	656	27.2	
Conservative	John Walter	626	26.0	
Green	Amanda Clare	584	24.3	
Green	Paul Hale	549	22.8	
Green	Debbie Dixon	466	19.4	
Liberal Democrats	Penelope Jones	352	14.6	
Liberal Democrats	Philip Wainewright	261	10.8	
Liberal Democrats	Rupert Redesdale	259	10.8	
Turnout		7,774		

=== St Pancras and Somers Town ===
St Pancras and Somers Town (3)
Party	Candidate	Votes	%	±%
Labour	Roger Robinson	960	53.0	
Labour	Sybil Shine	902	49.8	
Labour	Ruth Stewart	865	47.7	
Liberal Democrats	Elizabeth Hanna	379	20.9	
Liberal Democrats	Fiona Palmer	353	19.5	
Liberal Democrats	Ian Myers	349	19.3	
Conservative	Simon Gray	263	14.5	
Conservative	Damian Keegan	259	14.3	
Conservative	James White	249	13.7	
Green	Una Sapietis	219	12.1	
Socialist Alliance	Pol O'Ceallaigh	211	11.6	
Green	Andrew Spring	124	6.8	
Green	Judith Stubbings	116	6.4	
Turnout		5,249		

=== Swiss Cottage ===
Swiss Cottage (3)
Party	Candidate	Votes	%	±%
Conservative	Stephen Hocking	1,175	51.7	
Conservative	Andrew Marshall	1,106	48.6	
Conservative	Don Williams	1,090	47.9	
Labour	Geoffrey Berridge	500	22.0	
Labour	David Taggart	484	21.3	
Labour	Abdul Careem	467	20.5	
Liberal Democrats	Nicholas Collins	419	18.4	
Liberal Democrats	Rosalyn Harper	416	18.3	
Liberal Democrats	Honora Morrissey	391	17.2	
Green	Lucy Wills	265	11.7	
Green	Katherina Wolpe	174	7.7	
Green	Wolfgang Heiny	148	6.5	
Independent	Magnus Nielsen	36	1.6	
Turnout		6,671		

=== West Hampstead ===
West Hampstead (3)
Party	Candidate	Votes	%	±%
Liberal Democrats	Keith Moffitt	1,133	53.5	
Liberal Democrats	John Bryant	1,028	48.6	
Liberal Democrats	Heather Thompson	1,016	48.0	
Labour	Marie Bardsley	567	26.8	
Labour	Michael Broughton	507	24.0	
Labour	Mari Williams	469	22.2	
Conservative	Joanna Galloway	268	12.7	
Conservative	Simon Cliff	267	12.6	
Green	Samantha Baber	256	12.1	
Conservative	John Samiotis	240	11.3	
Green	Michael Hewitt-Hicks	173	8.2	
Green	Lawrie Scovell	163	7.7	
Turnout		6,087		
