= 1998 Camden London Borough Council election =

1998 local election in England

- 7 May 1998

All 59 seats up for election to Camden London Borough Council 30 seats needed for a majority
- Registered: 135,131
- Turnout: 45,168, 33.43% (▼8.85)

	First party	Second party
Leader	Richard Arthur	Judith Barnes
Party	Labour	Conservative
Leader since	1993	1990
Leader's seat	Highgate	Belsize (Note: Although he represented Belsize ward, in this election he stood for the Highgate ward and lost)
Last election	47 seats, 52.00%	7 seats, 23.76%
Seats before	46
Seats won	43	10
Seat change	▼4	▲3
Popular vote	44,346	10,835
Percentage	46.74%	25.09%
Swing	▼5.26	▲1.33
	Third party	Fourth party
Leader	Felicity M.P. Rea	John Macdonald
Party	Liberal Democrats	Independent Labour
Leader since	1988	Unknown
Leader's seat	Fortune Green	Swiss Cottage (lost)
Last election	5 seats, 18.37%	New
Seats before	5	1
Seats won	6	0
Seat change	▲1	Steady
Popular vote	22,247	600
Percentage	23.45%	0.63%
Swing	▲5.08	New
- Map of the results of the 1998 election to Camden London Borough Council. Labour (red) won every councillor in the south and east of the borough, while Conservatives (blue) and Liberal Democrats (yellow) won most councillors in Hampstead.
Council control after election before election
Labour
Council Control after election
Labour

The 1998 Camden Borough Council election took place on 7 May 1998 to elect members of Camden London Borough Council in London, England. The whole council was up for election and the Labour Party stayed in overall control of the council.

== Background ==
In the four years before this election there were two by-elections to replace councillors who resigned, one in Adelaide and one in Bloomsbury. These by-elections didn't result in seats changing parties however.

In addition to this there was one allegiance change from Labour to Independent Labour in the Swiss Cottage ward which meant the composition of the council just before the election was as follows:

↓
46	1	5	7
Labour	Ind. Labour	Lib Dem	Con

== Campaign ==
Issues in the election included a recent 10% council tax rise which was the highest in London, service improvements, claims that a partnership with the police had cut crime and a strike in local libraries.

== Election result ==
Overall turnout in the election was 33.4%. At the same as the election Camden saw 81.18% vote in favour of the 1998 Greater London Authority referendum and 18.82% against, on a 32.84% turnout.

1998 Camden London Borough Council election results
Party	Seats	Gains	Losses	Net gain/loss	Seats %	Votes %	Votes	+/−
Labour	43	1	5	▼4	72.88	46.74	44,346	▼5.26
Conservative	10	1	4	▲3	16.95	25.09	23,802	▲1.33
Liberal Democrats	6	1	0	▲1	10.17	23.45	22,247	▲5.08
Green	0	0	0	Steady	0.00	3.27	3,098	▼0.21
Independent	0	0	0	Steady	0.00	0.77	729	New
Independent Labour	0	0	0	Steady	0.00	0.63	600	New
Socialist (GB)	0	0	0	Steady	0.00	0.06	58	New
Total	59						94,839	

The council composition after the election was as follows:

↓
43	6	10
Labour	Lib Dem	Con

== Ward results ==
Key

* - Indicates an incumbent candidate
† - Indicates an incumbent candidate standing in a different ward

=== Adelaide ===
Adelaide (3)
Party	Candidate	Votes	%	±%
Conservative	Julian Tobin*	960	44.89	▲5.02
Conservative	Andrew Marshall	929		
Conservative	Piers Wauchope	868		
Labour	Sadashivrao Deshmukh^{†} (Note: Deshmukh was a sitting councillor representing the South End ward)	796	37.61	▼2.77
Labour	Harriet Garland^{†} (Note: Garland was a sitting councillor representing the Chalk Farm ward)	768		
Labour	Deborah Sacks^{†} (Note: Sacks was a sitting councillor representing the Highgate ward)	746		
Liberal Democrats	Mark Finney	384	17.50	▲5.20
Liberal Democrats	Pamela Collis	383		
Liberal Democrats	Madhvi Natt	308		
Registered electors		5,794		▲386
Turnout		2,242	38.70	▼5.72
Rejected ballots		31	1.38	▲1.21
Conservative gain from Labour				
Conservative hold				
Conservative gain from Labour				

=== Belsize ===
Belsize (3)
Party	Candidate	Votes	%	±%
Conservative	Ewan Cameron	760	33.20	▼2.07
Conservative	Huntly Spence	731		
Labour	Aileen Hammond	711		
Conservative	Jonathan Bucknell	705	30.01	▼3.44
Labour	David Taggart	650		
Labour	Jake Sumner	624		
Liberal Democrats	Pauline Marriott	587	23.64	▲2.95
Liberal Democrats	Dudley Miles	522		
Liberal Democrats	Ronald Watts	455		
Green	Phyllis Eyres	290	13.15	▲2.56
Registered electors		6,099		▲600
Turnout		2,148	35.22	▼8.55
Rejected ballots		31	1.44	▲1.02
Conservative hold				
Conservative gain from Labour				
Labour gain from Conservative				

=== Bloomsbury ===
Bloomsbury (3)
Party	Candidate	Votes	%	±%
Labour	Patricia Callaghan* (Note: Callaghan was elected in a by-election triggered by the resignation of Cllr Shelley Burke in 1995)	1,050	41.79	▼9.17
Labour	Nirmal Roy*	908		
Labour	Jake Turnbull	777		
Conservative	Barbara Douglass	626	25.00	▲0.81
Conservative	Mark Haley	538		
Conservative	Ian Nottingham	472		
Liberal Democrats	John Ward	468	20.37	▲1.95
Liberal Democrats	Philip Moser	455		
Liberal Democrats	Gerald Wall	410		
Green	Nicki Kortvelyessy	280	12.84	New
Registered electors		8,041		▲733
Turnout		2,203	27.40	▼5.65
Rejected ballots		27	1.23	▲1.02
Labour hold				
Labour hold				
Labour hold				

=== Brunswick ===
Brunswick (2)
Party	Candidate	Votes	%	±%
Labour	Brian Weekes*	653	38.27	▼14.90
Labour	Edward Cousins	601		
Conservative	Kenneth Avery	443	24.99	▼2.96
Conservative	Philip Norman	376		
Liberal Democrats	Penelope Jones	286	17.45	▼1.43
Green	Robert Whitley	258	15.75	New
Socialist (GB)	Stanley Parker	58	3.54	New
Registered electors		4,643		▲561
Turnout		1,450	31.23	▼7.06
Rejected ballots		13	0.90	▲0.58
Labour hold				
Labour hold				

=== Camden ===
Camden (2)
Party	Candidate	Votes	%	±%
Labour	Patricia Nightingale*	929	54.87	▼6.13
Labour	Dermot Greene*	844		
Liberal Democrats	Helena Djurkovic	323	18.07	▲1.95
Liberal Democrats	Simieon Litman	261		
Green	Douglas Earl	236	14.61	New
Conservative	Sylvia Currie	213	12.44	▲2.20
Conservative	Iris Coney	189		
Registered electors		5,616		▲463
Turnout		1,671	29.75	▼11.29
Rejected ballots		26	1.56	▲1.09
Labour hold				
Labour hold				

=== Castlehaven ===
Castlehaven (2)
Party	Candidate	Votes	%	±%
Labour	Jane Roberts*	677	51.15	▼7.49
Labour	Deirdre Krymer^{†} (Note: Krymer was a sitting councillor representing the Bloomsbury ward)	569		
Green	Kate Gordon	208	17.08	▲3.35
Liberal Democrats	Natasha Dunn	204	13.63	▼2.20
Conservative	Emma Chapman	158	12.23	▲0.43
Conservative	Joan Stally	140		
Liberal Democrats	Darren Ziff	128		
Independent	Jane Owen	72	5.91	New
Registered electors		4,120		▲276
Turnout		1,227	29.78	▼12.18
Rejected ballots		15	1.22	▲0.85
Labour hold				
Labour hold				

=== Caversham ===
Caversham (2)
Party	Candidate	Votes	%	±%
Labour	Bernard Kissen*	902	60.55	▲3.60
Labour	Anne Swain*	877		
Liberal Democrats	Soren Agerholm	378	24.92	▲9.47
Liberal Democrats	Brian Stone	354		
Conservative	Anthony Blackburn	247	14.53	▲0.07
Conservative	Barbara Wallis	180		
Registered electors		5,280		▲404
Turnout		1,626	30.80	▼9.13
Rejected ballots		34	2.09	▲1.73
Labour hold				
Labour hold				

=== Chalk Farm ===
Chalk Farm (2)
Party	Candidate	Votes	%	±%
Labour	William Budd*	615	43.97	▲0.94
Labour	John White^{†} (Note: White was a sitting councillor representing the King's Cross ward)	591		
Liberal Democrats	Charles Marquand	419	29.68	▲15.84
Liberal Democrats	Rupert Redesdale	395		
Conservative	William Mitchell	385	26.36	▲6.00
Conservative	David Walters	338		
Registered electors		4,094		▲432
Turnout		1,475	36.03	▼11.38
Rejected ballots		19	1.29	▲1.12
Labour hold				
Labour hold				

=== Fitzjohns ===
Fitzjohns (2)
Party	Candidate	Votes	%	±%
Conservative	Martin Davies	590	43.54	▲6.26
Conservative	Karl Mennear	536		
Labour	Peter Dann	393	30.28	▲2.57
Labour	Deborah Townsend	390		
Liberal Democrats	Martin Wright	245	18.76	▲2.39
Liberal Democrats	Ricarda O'Driscoll	240		
Green	Dorothy Forsyth	96	7.42	▼1.06
Registered electors		3,840		▲602
Turnout		1,298	33.80	▼6.16
Rejected ballots		9	0.69	▲0.46
Conservative hold				
Conservative hold				

=== Fortune Green ===
Fortune Green (2)
Party	Candidate	Votes	%	±%
Liberal Democrats	Flick Rea*	975	60.03	▲6.53
Liberal Democrats	Jane Schopflin*	829		
Labour	Michael Broughton	375	24.86	▼2.40
Labour	Roy Lockett	372		
Conservative	Carrie Ruxton	228	15.11	▲0.55
Conservative	Michael Prichett	226		
Registered electors		4,096		▲629
Turnout		1,609	39.28	▼12.09
Rejected ballots		19	1.18	▲0.96
Liberal Democrats hold				
Liberal Democrats hold				

=== Frognal ===
Frognal (2)
Party	Candidate	Votes	%	±%
Conservative	Pamela Chesters*	687	48.90	▲9.40
Conservative	Dawn Somper*	640		
Labour	Anne Robertson	311	21.74	▲0.15
Labour	Helen Seaford	279		
Liberal Democrats	Barbara How	272	19.34	▲2.78
Liberal Democrats	Nigel Barnes	253		
Green	Charles Harris	136	10.02	▲2.28
Registered electors		4,380		▲462
Turnout		1,346	30.73	▼10.06
Rejected ballots		11	0.82	▲0.63
Conservative hold				
Conservative hold				

=== Gospel Oak ===
Gospel Oak (2)
Party	Candidate	Votes	%	±%
Labour	John Mills*	760	52.76	▼3.17
Labour	Judith Pattison^{†} (Note: Pattison was a sitting councillor representing the Belsize ward.)	719		
Liberal Democrats	Margaret Jackson-Roberts	336	22.01	▲6.13
Liberal Democrats	Jeffrey Poulter	281		
Conservative	Marian Harrison	221	14.31	▼2.79
Conservative	Henry Whittaker	180		
Green	Debra Green	153	10.92	▼0.17
Registered electors		4,464		▲167
Turnout		1,499	33.58	▼6.47
Rejected ballots		14	0.93	▲0.70
Labour hold				
Labour hold				

=== Grafton ===
Grafton (2)
Party	Candidate	Votes	%	±%
Labour	Roy Shaw*	705	55.67	▼16.43
Labour	John Dickie^{†} (Note: Dickie was a sitting councillor representing the Hampstead Town ward. He was originally elected as Liberal Democrat but in this election has switched to the Labour Party)	660		
Liberal Democrats	Margaret Finer	221	16.80	▲2.50
Liberal Democrats	Anne Elliott	191		
Conservative	Doreen Bartlett	187	13.66	▲0.06
Green	Sheila Oakes	170	13.87	New
Conservative	Belinda Shapps	148		
Registered electors		4,422		▲222
Turnout		1,287	29.10	▼10.11
Rejected ballots		26	2.02	▲1.35
Labour hold				
Labour hold				

=== Hampstead Town ===
Hampstead Town (2)
Party	Candidate	Votes	%	±%
Liberal Democrats	Margaret Little*	1,028	60.21	▲7.79
Liberal Democrats	Sidney Malin	912		
Conservative	Roderick Anderson	368	22.41	▼2.50
Conservative	Michael Bottom	354		
Labour	Mark Leonard	301	17.38	▼0.15
Labour	Rudolph Champagne	259		
Registered electors		3,985		▲293
Turnout		1,625	40.78	▼10.24
Rejected ballots		12	0.74	▲0.63
Liberal Democrats hold				
Liberal Democrats hold				

=== Highgate ===
Highgate (3)
Party	Candidate	Votes	%	±%
Labour	Maggie Cosin*	1,275	38.93	▼8.38
Labour	Richard Arthur*	1,252		
Labour	John Thane^{†} (Note: Thane was a sitting councillor representing the St John's ward)	1,141		
Conservative	Judith Barnes^{†} (Note: Barnes was a sitting councillor representing the Belsize ward)	930	27.85	▲5.46
Conservative	Roger Freeman	869		
Conservative	Cynthia Silk	825		
Liberal Democrats	Heather Macauley	666	18.22	▲4.64
Liberal Democrats	Richard Waddington	594		
Green	Paul Gannon	471	15.00	▼1.72
Liberal Democrats	Peter Mair	457		
Registered electors		7,427		▲379
Turnout		3,031	40.81	▼9.47
Rejected ballots		24	0.79	▲0.62
Labour hold				
Labour hold				
Labour hold				

=== Holborn ===
Holborn (2)
Party	Candidate	Votes	%	±%
Labour	Julian Fulbrook*	948	62.51	▲9.21
Labour	Brian Woodrow*	838		
Conservative	William Glossop	328	19.00	▲4.61
Liberal Democrats	Pamela Lutgen	264	18.49	▲8.15
Liberal Democrats	Barbara Turner	264		
Conservative	Shailesh Vara	215		
Registered electors		4,807		▲326
Turnout		1,629	33.89	▼10.61
Rejected ballots		31	1.90	▲1.45
Labour hold				
Labour hold				

=== Kilburn ===
Kilburn (3)
Party	Candidate	Votes	%	±%
Labour	Heather Johnson*	1,181	46.11	▼5.33
Labour	Charles Hedges*	1,007		
Labour	Timothy Walker*	957		
Conservative	Robert Graham	435	17.83	▲5.44
Conservative	Jane Stanton-Humphreys	395		
Conservative	Jonathan Morgan	386		
Green	Helen Mayer	362	15.92	▲5.62
Independent	Lawrence Morris	267	11.75	New
Liberal Democrats	David Glover	233	8.39	▼2.49
Liberal Democrats	Jeremy Allen	206		
Liberal Democrats	Erich Wagner	133		
Registered electors		7,606		▲998
Turnout		2,119	27.86	▼11.46
Rejected ballots		30	1.42	▲1.27
Labour hold				
Labour hold				
Labour hold				

=== King's Cross ===
King's Cross (2)
Party	Candidate	Votes	%	±%
Labour	Barbara Hughes	833	62.68	▼2.05
Labour	Nick Smith	766		
Conservative	James Atkin	269	18.82	▲0.50
Liberal Democrats	Rosemary Gandy	240	18.50	▲1.54
Liberal Democrats	Eleanor Freedman	232		
Conservative	Robert Ricketts	211		
Registered electors		5,057		▲281
Turnout		1,447	28.61	▼7.19
Rejected ballots		28	1.94	▲1.30
Labour hold				
Labour hold				

=== Priory ===
Priory (2)
Party	Candidate	Votes	%	±%
Labour	John Rolfe	823	64.89	▼1.20
Labour	Phil Turner*	809		
Conservative	Martyn Fisher	276	20.64	▼0.06
Conservative	Rose Irwin	243		
Liberal Democrats	Rex Warner	226	14.47	▲1.26
Liberal Democrats	Joan Hervey	138		
Registered electors		4,607		▲254
Turnout		1,468	31.86	▼11.01
Rejected ballots		21	1.43	▲1.22
Labour hold				
Labour hold				

=== Regent's Park ===
Regent's Park (3)
Party	Candidate	Votes	%	±%
Labour	James Turner*	1,125	48.30	▲0.31
Labour	Barbara Ward	983		
Labour	Richard Olszewski*	947		
Conservative	Paul Gray	540	22.45	▲2.27
Conservative	Anthony Kemp	468		
Conservative	Jeremy Bradshaw	412		
Liberal Democrats	Ardon Lyon	354	15.64	▲3.65
Liberal Democrats	David Berry	350		
Independent	Alan Patterson	287	13.61	New
Liberal Democrats	Benjamin Newbrook	285		
Registered electors		6,863		▲784
Turnout		2,245	32.71	▼11.28
Rejected ballots		46	2.05	▲1.98
Labour hold				
Labour hold				
Labour hold				

=== St John's ===
St John's (2)
Party	Candidate	Votes	%	±%
Labour	Penelope Abraham*	990	64.43	▲0.96
Labour	David Horan^{†} (Note: Horan was a sitting councillor representing the Regent's Park ward)	977		
Liberal Democrats	Diana Brown	406	24.80	▲10.03
Liberal Democrats	Stephen Molesworth	351		
Conservative	Michael Farrer	183	10.78	▲0.92
Conservative	Roland Walker	146		
Registered electors		4,710		▲391
Turnout		1,652	35.07	▼5.66
Rejected ballots		28	1.69	▲1.12
Labour hold				
Labour hold				

=== St Pancras ===
St Pancras (2)
Party	Candidate	Votes	%	±%
Labour	Gloria Lazenby*	686	60.47	▼3.56
Labour	Roger Robinson	576		
Liberal Democrats	Fiona Palmer	254	23.48	▲8.91
Liberal Democrats	Ian Myers	236		
Conservative	Laura Hoskins	173	16.05	▲4.70
Conservative	Blanche Mundlak	162		
Registered electors		3,803		▲318
Turnout		1,259	33.11	▲5.28
Rejected ballots		19	1.51	▲1.44
Labour hold				
Labour hold				

=== Somers Town ===
Somers Town (2)
Party	Candidate	Votes	%	±%
Labour	Sybil Shine*	815	57.60	▼4.95
Labour	Ernest James^{†} (Note: James was a sitting councillor representing the Brunswick ward)	743		
Conservative	David Harris	226	14.38	▲3.26
Liberal Democrats	Caroline Ford	225	16.64	▲4.88
Conservative	Joseph Sleigh	163		
Green	Andrew Spring	154	11.39	New
Registered electors		4,874		▲109
Turnout		1,375	28.21	▼10.78
Rejected ballots		23	1.67	▲1.19
Labour hold				
Labour hold				

=== South End ===
South End (2)
Party	Candidate	Votes	%	±%
Labour	Gerry Harrison*	999	54.29	▲7.06
Labour	Janet Guthrie	919		
Conservative	Jonathan Pardoe	490	26.07	▲2.88
Conservative	Dominic Schofield	431		
Liberal Democrats	Peter Buonacorsi-How	348	19.64	▲6.48
Liberal Democrats	Andrew Wade	346		
Registered electors		4,972		▲650
Turnout		1,893	38.07	▼7.74
Rejected ballots		20	1.06	▲0.96
Labour hold				
Labour hold				

=== Swiss Cottage ===
Swiss Cottage (3)
Party	Candidate	Votes	%	±%
Labour	Mary Ryan	887	28.58	▼12.32
Labour	Robert Hall^{†} (Note: Hall was a sitting councillor representing the Gospel Oak ward)	834		
Conservative	Stephen Hocking	756	26.35	▼8.07
Conservative	Honora Morrissey	754		
Conservative	Peter Horne	732		
Labour	Bernard Moss	710		
Independent Labour	John Macdonald* (Note: Macdonald was originally elected as a Labour Party councillor but at some point left the party and became an Independent Labour councillor)	600	21.16	New
Liberal Democrats	Nicholas Collins	439	13.89	▼1.79
Liberal Democrats	Sally Twite	378		
Liberal Democrats	Herbert Newbrook	365		
Green	Catherine Gregory	284	10.02	▲1.02
Registered electors		6,871		▲827
Turnout		2,433	35.41	▼6.62
Rejected ballots		33	1.36	▲1.20
Labour hold				
Labour hold				
Conservative gain from Labour				

=== West End ===
West End (2)
Party	Candidate	Votes	%	±%
Liberal Democrats	Keith Moffitt*	972	49.21	▼10.29
Liberal Democrats	Heather Thompson	811		
Labour	David Lines*	705	37.18	▼5.54
Labour	Geoffrey Berridge	642		
Conservative	Neil Bourhill	156	7.92	▼3.62
Conservative	Elaine Mackover	131		
Independent	Farshtchi Ahavan	62	3.42	New
Independent	Antoine Clarke	41	2.26	New
Registered electors		4,660		▲524
Turnout		1,911	41.01	▼8.36
Rejected ballots		14	0.73	▲0.58
Liberal Democrats gain from Labour				
Liberal Democrats hold				
