= Highgate (Camden ward) =

Electoral ward in the London borough of Camden

- Electoral ward for the Camden London Borough Council
- Highgate (Camden) ward boundaries since 2022
- Borough: Camden
- County: Greater London
- Population: 10,200 (1966); 10,226 (2021) (Note: 2021 Census data reported for 2022 ward boundaries)
- Electorate: 7,703 (1964); 7,550 (1978); 7,048 (1994); 7,936 (2002); 7,880 (2022)
- Area: 2.981 square kilometres (1.151 sq mi) (1968); 3.188 square kilometres (1.231 sq mi) (2022)

Current electoral ward
- Created: 1965
- Number of members: 3
- Councillors: Anna Wright; Camron Aref-Adib; Lorna Russell
- ONS code: 00AGGN (2002–2022)
- GSS code: E05000137 (2002–2022); E05013661 (2022–present)

Highgate is an electoral ward in the London Borough of Camden, in the United Kingdom. The ward has existed since the creation of the borough on 1 April 1965 and was first used in the 1964 elections. It returns three councillors to Camden London Borough Council. The boundaries of the ward were subject to minor changes in May 1978, April 1994, May 2002 and May 2022.

== History ==
In October 2019, during its review of the London Borough of Camden, the Local Government Boundary Commission for England (LGBCE) proposed removing Dartmouth Park from the Highgate ward. Dartmouth Park would be represented by two councillors while the rest of Highgate would be represented by one councillor. This was met with "anger" from local residents, and the LGBCE's final recommendations for Camden, published in February 2020, included only a single three-member ward for Highgate, accepting that "its previous proposal a two-councillor ward alongside a one-councillor ward would have divided local communities."

== List of councillors ==
| Term | Councillor | Party |
|---|---|---|
| 1964–1968; 1978–1986 | Martin Morton | Conservative |
| 1964–1968 | William Brennan | Conservative |
| 1964–1968 | Roland Walker | Conservative |
| 1968–1969 | Peter Brooke | Conservative |
| 1968–1974 | Ronald Walker | Conservative |
| 1968–1971 | Denis Friis | Conservative |
| 1969–1971 | Harriet Greenway | Conservative |
| 1971–1978 | John Carrier | Labour |
| 1971–1974 | Christopher Fenwick | Conservative |
| 1974–1978 | Jeanne Cox | Labour |
| 1974–1978 | Albert Crouch | Labour |
| 1978–1982 | Roger James | Conservative |
| 1978–1982 | Derek Spencer | Conservative |
| 1982–1986 | Anthony Blackburn | Conservative |
| 1982–1990 | Barbara Beck | Labour |
| 1986–2006 | Margaret Cosin | Labour |
| 1986–1992 | John Wakeham | Labour |
| 1990–2002 | Richard Arthur | Labour |
| 1992–1998 | Deborah Sacks | Labour |
| 1998–2006 | John Thane | Labour |
| 2002–2006 | Abdul Quadir | Labour |
| 2006–2014 | Maya De Souza | Green |
| 2006–2008 | Paul Barton | Conservative |
| 2006–2010 | Adrian Oliver | Green |
| 2008–2010 | Alex Goodman | Green |
| 2010–2014 | Valerie Leach | Labour |
| 2010–2011 | Michael Nicolaides | Labour |
| 2011–2018 | Sally Gimson | Labour |
| 2014–2022 | Oliver Lewis | Labour |
| 2014–2023 | Siân Berry | Green |
| 2018–present | Anna Wright | Labour |
| 2022–present | Camron Aref-Adib | Labour |
| 2023–present | Lorna Russell | Green |

== Summary ==
Councillors elected by party at each general borough election.

- Conservative
- Labour
- Green

== Camden council elections since 2022 ==
There was a revision of ward boundaries in Camden in 2022. There was a small transfer of population in the Sanderson Close and Carrol Close area from Highgate to the new ward of Kentish Town North.

=== 2026 election ===
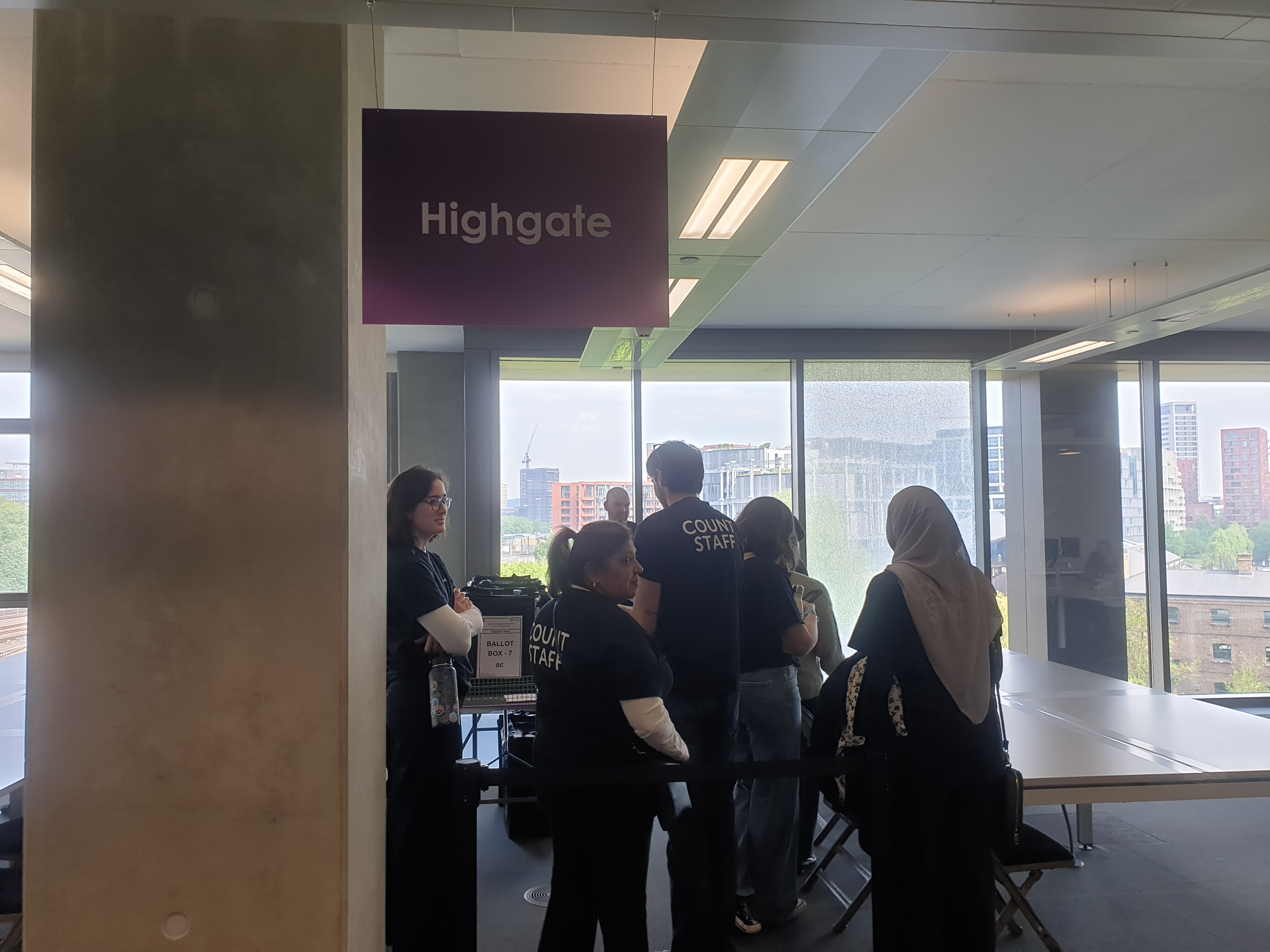
A briefing for council staff before counting the results of the 7 May 2026 Camden Council elections in Highgate ward

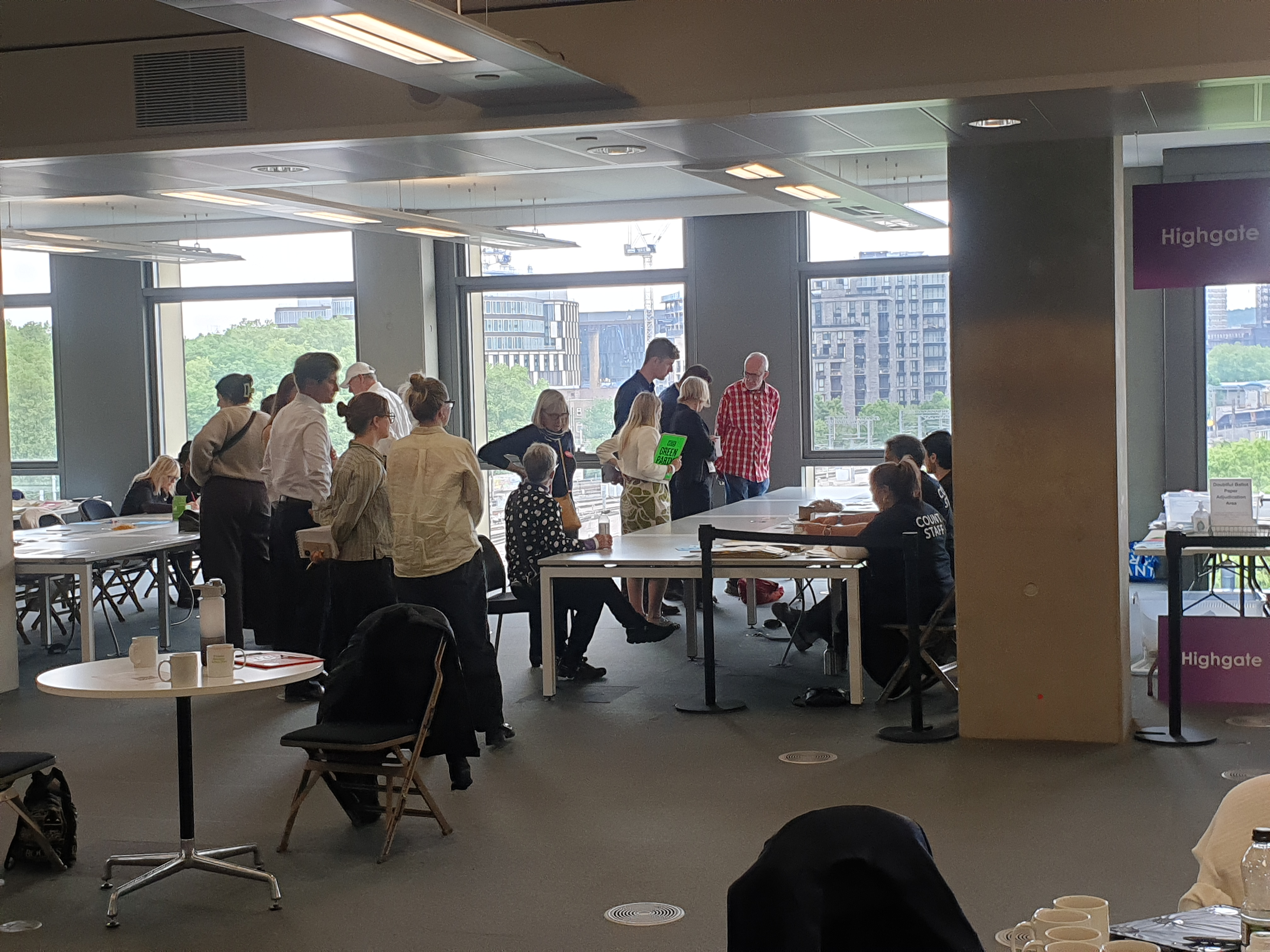
Candidates and party agents watching the count for the 7 May 2026 Camden Council elections in Highgate ward, including Lorna Russell

Lorna Russell, Anna Wright and Camron Aref-Adib were all re-elected. The election took place on 7 May 2026.

Highgate (3 seats)
| Party | Candidate | Votes | % | ±% |
|---|---|---|---|---|
| Green | Lorna Jane Russell* | 1,908 | | |
| Labour | Camron Aref-Adib* | 1,815 | | |
| Labour | Anna Wright* | 1,810 | | |
| Green | Alice Brown | 1,612 | | |
| Green | James Dicker | 1,352 | | |
| Labour | John Carr | 1,253 | | |
| Conservative | Judith Barnes | 522 | | |
| Conservative | Will Finn | 494 | | |
| Conservative | Johnny Chapman | 425 | | |
| Reform | Ben Brook | 342 | | |
| Liberal Democrats | Henry Potts | 250 | | |
| Liberal Democrats | Mark Finney | 205 | | |
| Liberal Democrats | Munro Price | 184 | | |
| Turnout | | | 52.65 | +3.65 |
| Green hold | | Swing | | |
| Labour hold | | Swing | | |
| Labour hold | | Swing | | |

=== 2023 by-election ===
The by-election took place on 30 November 2023, following the resignation of Siân Berry.

2023 Highgate by-election
| Party | Candidate | Votes | % | ±% |
|---|---|---|---|---|
| Green | Lorna Russell | 1,513 | 58.7 | ▲15.0 |
| Labour | Tricia Leman | 740 | 28.7 | ▼13.5 |
| Conservative | Wakjira Feyesa | 240 | 9.3 | ▼0.3 |
| Liberal Democrats | Farrell Monk | 84 | 3.3 | ▼1.3 |
| Majority | | 773 | 30.0 | |
| Turnout | | 2,577 | 33.2 | |
| Green hold | | Swing | ▲14.3 | |

=== 2022 election ===
The election took place on 5 May 2022.

2022 Camden London Borough Council election: Highgate
| Party | Candidate | Votes | % | ±% |
|---|---|---|---|---|
| Green | Siân Berry | 1,967 | 51.0 | +0.9 |
| Labour | Anna Wright | 1,898 | 49.2 | +7.1 |
| Labour | Camron Aref-Adib | 1,809 | 46.9 | +5.1 |
| Labour | Panny Antoniou | 1,527 | 39.6 | +2.6 |
| Green | Lorna Russell | 1,460 | 37.8 | +6.7 |
| Green | David Stansell | 929 | 24.1 | −4.9 |
| Conservative | Paul Farrow | 431 | 11.2 | −4.8 |
| Conservative | Judith Barnes | 403 | 10.4 | −1.7 |
| Conservative | Richard Merrin | 380 | 9.8 | −1.4 |
| Liberal Democrats | Munro Price | 206 | 5.3 | −1.6 |
| Liberal Democrats | Henry Potts | 188 | 4.9 | −1.1 |
| Liberal Democrats | Stephen Pickthall | 172 | 4.5 | −1.4 |
| Turnout | | 3,859 | 49.0 | −1.42 |
| Green win (new boundaries) | | | | |
| Labour win (new boundaries) | | | | |
| Labour win (new boundaries) | | | | |

== 2002–2022 Camden council elections ==
Highgate (Camden) ward boundaries from 2002 to 2022

There was a revision of ward boundaries in Camden in 2002. Highgate ward took in an area south of the Gospel Oak to Barking railway line including the Sanderson Close and Carrol Close area and a triangle of industrial land surrounded by railways.

=== 2018 election ===
The election took place on 3 May 2018.

2018 Camden London Borough Council election: Highgate
| Party | Candidate | Votes | % | ±% |
|---|---|---|---|---|
| Green | Siân Berry | 2,073 | | |
| Labour | Anna Wright | 1,741 | | |
| Labour | Oliver Lewis | 1,727 | | |
| Labour | Maddy Raman | 1,530 | | |
| Green | Kirsten De Keyser | 1,387 | | |
| Green | John Holmes | 1,197 | | |
| Conservative | Simone Finn | 563 | | |
| Conservative | Ben Seifert | 501 | | |
| Conservative | Jim Ormiston | 493 | | |
| Liberal Democrats | Helena Djurkovic | 284 | | |
| Liberal Democrats | Henry Potts | 248 | | |
| Liberal Democrats | Stephen Raymond Pickthall | 245 | | |
| Independent | Emily O'Mara | 83 | | |
| Independent | Constantine Buhayer | 48 | | |
| Turnout | | 12,120 | 50.42 | |
| Green hold | | Swing | | |
| Labour hold | | Swing | | |
| Labour hold | | Swing | | |

=== 2014 election ===
The election took place on 22 May 2014.

2014 Camden London Borough Council election: Highgate
| Party | Candidate | Votes | % | ±% |
|---|---|---|---|---|
| Labour | Sally Gimson | 1,739 | | |
| Labour | Oliver Lewis | 1,664 | | |
| Green | Siân Berry | 1,642 | | |
| Labour | Valerie Leach | 1,567 | | |
| Green | Matthew Johnston | 1,252 | | |
| Green | Robert McCracken | 1,099 | | |
| Conservative | Beth Charlesworth | 763 | | |
| Conservative | Will Blair | 727 | | |
| Conservative | Will Dilnott-Cooper | 662 | | |
| Liberal Democrats | Henry Potts | 232 | | |
| Liberal Democrats | Martin Charles Hay | 198 | | |
| Liberal Democrats | Martin Wright | 130 | | |
| Turnout | | 11,702 | 50.0 | |
| Labour hold | | Swing | | |
| Labour hold | | Swing | | |
| Green hold | | Swing | | |

=== 2011 by-election ===
The by-election took place on 15 September 2011, following the resignation of Michael Nicolaides.

2011 Highgate by-election
| Party | Candidate | Votes | % | ±% |
|---|---|---|---|---|
| Labour | Sally Gimson | 1,178 | 41.6 | +12.6 |
| Green | Alexis Rowell | 947 | 33.5 | +3.0 |
| Conservative | Anthony Denyer | 593 | 21.0 | +0.7 |
| Liberal Democrats | Martin Hay | 111 | 3.9 | −16.3 |
| Majority | | 231 | 8.2 | |
| Turnout | | 2,829 | 34.3 | |
| Labour hold | | Swing | | |

=== 2010 election ===
The election on 6 May 2010 took place on the same day as the United Kingdom general election.

2010 Camden London Borough Council election: Highgate
| Party | Candidate | Votes | % | ±% |
|---|---|---|---|---|
| Green | Maya De Souza | 1,889 | 33.0 | −2.3 |
| Labour | Valerie Leach | 1,800 | 31.4 | +4.5 |
| Labour | Michael Nicolaides | 1,661 | 29.0 | +4.6 |
| Labour | Michael Way | 1,625 | 28.4 | +5.3 |
| Green | Naomi Aptowitzer | 1,467 | 25.6 | −6.4 |
| Green | Tristan Smith | 1,307 | 22.8 | −7.9 |
| Liberal Democrats | Ed Clayton | 1,255 | 21.9 | +11.2 |
| Conservative | Anthony Denyer | 1,254 | 21.9 | −10.4 |
| Conservative | Beth Charlesworth | 1,239 | 21.6 | −8.3 |
| Conservative | Stephen Daughton | 1,223 | 21.3 | −8.3 |
| Liberal Democrats | Kirsten De Keyser | 1,047 | 18.3 | +8.9 |
| Liberal Democrats | David Simmons | 947 | 16.5 | +7.9 |
| Turnout | | 16,714 | 69.9 | +22.4 |
| Green hold | | Swing | | |
| Labour gain from Green | | Swing | | |
| Labour gain from Green | | Swing | | |

=== 2008 by-election ===
The by-election took place on 1 May 2008, following the resignation of Paul Barton.

2008 Highgate by-election
| Party | Candidate | Votes | % | ±% |
|---|---|---|---|---|
| Green | Alex Goodman | 1,482 | 33.1 | −0.5 |
| Labour | Michael Nicolaides | 1,185 | 26.5 | +1.0 |
| Conservative | Richard Merrin | 1,180 | 26.3 | −4.4 |
| Liberal Democrats | Henry Potts | 633 | 14.1 | +3.9 |
| Majority | | 297 | 6.6 | |
| Turnout | | 4,480 | 56.5 | |
| Green gain from Conservative | | Swing | | |

=== 2006 election ===
The election took place on 4 May 2006.

2006 Camden London Borough Council election: Highgate
| Party | Candidate | Votes | % | ±% |
|---|---|---|---|---|
| Green | Maya De Souza | 1,336 | | |
| Conservative | Paul Barton | 1,221 | | |
| Green | Adrian Oliver | 1,210 | | |
| Green | Quentin Tyler | 1,159 | | |
| Conservative | Gary Benardout | 1,129 | | |
| Conservative | Richard Merrin | 1,121 | | |
| Labour | Margaret Cosin | 1,016 | | |
| Labour | George Queen | 922 | | |
| Labour | John Thane | 873 | | |
| Liberal Democrats | Henry Potts | 406 | | |
| Liberal Democrats | Laura Watkins | 356 | | |
| Liberal Democrats | Philip Wainewright | 325 | | |
| Turnout | | 11,074 | 47.5 | |
| Green gain from Labour | | Swing | | |
| Conservative gain from Labour | | Swing | | |
| Green gain from Labour | | Swing | | |

=== 2002 election ===
The election took place on 2 May 2002.

2002 Camden London Borough Council election: Highgate
| Party | Candidate | Votes | % | ±% |
|---|---|---|---|---|
| Labour | Margaret Cosin | 972 | | |
| Labour | John Thane | 861 | | |
| Labour | Abdul Quadir | 849 | | |
| Conservative | Roger Freeman | 813 | | |
| Green | Siân Berry | 811 | | |
| Conservative | Simon Baker | 790 | | |
| Conservative | Janice Lavery | 775 | | |
| Green | Adrian Oliver | 768 | | |
| Green | Mark Smith | 715 | | |
| Liberal Democrats | Alison Wheeler | 384 | | |
| Liberal Democrats | Richard Waddington | 376 | | |
| Liberal Democrats | Henry Potts | 332 | | |
| Socialist Alliance | Sean Thompson | 219 | | |
| Turnout | | 8,665 | | |
| Labour win (new boundaries) | | | | |
| Labour win (new boundaries) | | | | |
| Labour win (new boundaries) | | | | |

== 1994–2002 Camden council elections ==
The boundaries of the ward were adjusted on 1 April 1994. The Highgate ward and Camden borough boundaries were realigned to Hampstead Lane, which transferred 0.09 square kilometres (0.035 sq mi) and a population of 142 from Highgate (Haringey) ward to Highgate (Camden) ward.

=== 1998 election ===
The election took place on 7 May 1998.

1998 Camden London Borough Council election: Highgate
| Party | Candidate | Votes | % | ±% |
|---|---|---|---|---|
| Labour | Margaret Cosin | 1,275 | | |
| Labour | Richard Arthur | 1,252 | | |
| Labour | John Thane | 1,141 | | |
| Conservative | Judith Barnes | 930 | | |
| Conservative | Roger Freeman | 869 | | |
| Conservative | Cynthia Silk | 825 | | |
| Liberal Democrats | Heather Macauley | 666 | | |
| Liberal Democrats | Richard Waddington | 594 | | |
| Green | Paul Gannon | 471 | | |
| Liberal Democrats | Peter Mair | 457 | | |
| Turnout | | 8,480 | 40.8 | |
| Labour hold | | Swing | | |
| Labour hold | | Swing | | |
| Labour hold | | Swing | | |

=== 1994 election ===
The election took place on 5 May 1994.

1994 Camden London Borough Council election: Highgate
| Party | Candidate | Votes | % | ±% |
|---|---|---|---|---|
| Labour | Margaret Cosin | 1,805 | | |
| Labour | Richard Arthur | 1,795 | | |
| Labour | Deborah Sacks | 1,731 | | |
| Conservative | Cynthia Silk | 890 | | |
| Conservative | Martyn Fisher | 833 | | |
| Conservative | Tanya Warburg | 801 | | |
| Green | Walter Eyres | 628 | | |
| Liberal Democrats | Richard Waddington | 525 | | |
| Liberal Democrats | Stephen Molesworth | 520 | | |
| Liberal Democrats | Henry Potts | 484 | | |
| Turnout | | | 50.3% | |
| Labour win (new boundaries) | | | | |
| Labour win (new boundaries) | | | | |
| Labour win (new boundaries) | | | | |

== 1978–1994 Camden council elections ==
Highgate (Camden) ward boundaries from 1978 to 1994

There was a revision of ward boundaries in Camden in 1978. Highgate ward took in more of the Dartmouth Park area, north of the Gospel Oak to Barking railway line, that had previously been part of the Gospel Oak and St John's wards.

=== 1992 by-election ===
The by-election took place on 15 October 1992, following the resignation of John Wakeham.

1992 Highgate by-election
| Party | Candidate | Votes | % | ±% |
|---|---|---|---|---|
| Labour | Deborah Sacks | 994 | | |
| Conservative | Cynthia Silk | 848 | | |
| Liberal Democrats | Henry Potts | 328 | | |
| Turnout | | | | |
| Labour hold | | Swing | | |

=== 1990 election ===
The election took place on 3 May 1990.

1990 Camden London Borough Council election: Highgate
| Party | Candidate | Votes | % |
|---|---|---|---|
| Labour | Margaret Cosin | 1,785 | 45.01 |
| Labour | Richard Arthur | 1,780 | |
| Labour | John Wakeham | 1,598 | |
| Conservative | Cynthia Silk | 1,084 | 26.91 |
| Conservative | John Steinberg | 1,010 | |
| Conservative | Michael Stilwell | 992 | |
| Green | Peter Forrest | 502 | 12.58 |
| Green | Jennifer M. Jones | 460 | |
| Liberal Democrats | Stephen L. Molesworth | 329 | 7.50 |
| Liberal Democrats | Mark E.K. Withers | 268 | |
| Liberal Democrats | Gertrude F.M. Sington | 265 | |
| Camden Charter | Mary C. Hodgson-Bennett | 239 | 5.99 |
| Camden Charter | Olive R.M. Gatenby | 226 | |
| Camden Charter | Jennifer P. Page | 223 | |
| Tenants' Representative | Laurence Williams | 77 | 2.01 |
| Registered electors | | 7,444 | |
| Turnout | | 3802 | 51.07 |
| Rejected ballots | | 8 | 0.21 |
| Labour hold | | | |
| Labour hold | | | |
| Labour hold | | | |

=== 1986 election ===
The election took place on 8 May 1986.

1986 Camden London Borough Council election: Highgate
| Party | Candidate | Votes | % | ±% |
|---|---|---|---|---|
| Labour | Barbara Beck | 1,966 | | |
| Labour | Margaret Cosin | 1,844 | | |
| Labour | John Wakeham | 1,739 | | |
| Conservative | Martin Morton | 1,185 | | |
| Conservative | Lesley Fields | 1,129 | | |
| Conservative | Peter Horne | 1,109 | | |
| Alliance | James McKinley | 901 | | |
| Alliance | Christina Schopflin | 896 | | |
| Alliance | Margaret Jackson-Roberts | 890 | | |
| Turnout | | | | |
| Labour hold | | Swing | | |
| Labour gain from Conservative | | Swing | | |
| Labour gain from Conservative | | Swing | | |

=== 1982 election ===
The election took place on 6 May 1982.

1982 Camden London Borough Council election: Highgate
| Party | Candidate | Votes | % | ±% |
|---|---|---|---|---|
| Conservative | Anthony Blackburn | 1,504 | | |
| Conservative | Martin Morton | 1,473 | | |
| Labour | Barbara Beck | 1,463 | | |
| Labour | Beresford Wilkinson | 1,418 | | |
| Labour | Donald Harkness | 1,393 | | |
| Conservative | Lilian O'Callaghan | 1,377 | | |
| Alliance | Catherine Walton | 1,151 | | |
| Alliance | John Coss | 1,143 | | |
| Alliance | Malcolm Winsbury | 1,049 | | |
| Turnout | | | | |
| Conservative hold | | Swing | | |
| Conservative hold | | Swing | | |
| Labour gain from Conservative | | Swing | | |

=== 1978 election ===
The election took place on 4 May 1978.

1978 Camden London Borough Council election: Highgate
| Party | Candidate | Votes | % | ±% |
|---|---|---|---|---|
| Conservative | Martin Morton | 2,026 | | |
| Conservative | Roger James | 1,961 | | |
| Conservative | Derek Spencer | 1,966 | | |
| Labour | Walter Burgess | 1,809 | | |
| Labour | David Webster | 1,787 | | |
| Labour | Albert Crouch | 1,774 | | |
| Communist | Margaret Lee | 194 | | |
| Turnout | | | | |
| Conservative win (new boundaries) | | | | |
| Conservative win (new boundaries) | | | | |
| Conservative win (new boundaries) | | | | |

== 1971–1978 Camden council elections ==
There was a revision of ward boundaries in Camden in 1971.

=== 1974 election ===
The election took place on 2 May 1974.

1974 Camden London Borough Council election: Highgate
| Party | Candidate | Votes | % | ±% |
|---|---|---|---|---|
| Labour | John Carrier | 1,607 | 44.5 | |
| Labour | Jeanne Cox | 1,462 | | |
| Labour | Albert J. Crouch | 1,380 | | |
| Conservative | Martin Morton | 1,369 | 37.9 | |
| Conservative | Christopher Fenwick | 1,319 | | |
| Conservative | Ronald Walker | 1,306 | | |
| Liberal | Clive Coates | 423 | 11.7 | |
| Liberal | Alfred Cook | 395 | | |
| Communist | Peter Richards | 210 | 5.8 | |
| Turnout | | | 48.4 | |
| Labour gain from Conservative | | Swing | | |
| Labour hold | | Swing | | |
| Labour gain from Conservative | | Swing | | |

=== 1971 election ===
The election took place on 13 May 1971.

1971 Camden London Borough Council election: Highgate
| Party | Candidate | Votes | % | ±% |
|---|---|---|---|---|
| Conservative | Ronald Walker | 1,735 | 46.6 | |
| Labour | John Carrier | 1,724 | 46.3 | |
| Conservative | Christopher Fenwick | 1,715 | | |
| Conservative | Denis Friis | 1,711 | | |
| Labour | Jeanne Cox | 1,703 | | |
| Labour | Bernard Miller | 1,656 | | |
| Communist | Jean Davis | 262 | 7.0 | |
| Turnout | | | 46.9 | |
| Conservative win (new boundaries) | | | | |
| Conservative win (new boundaries) | | | | |
| Conservative win (new boundaries) | | | | |

== 1964–1971 Camden council elections ==
External image
- Highgate (Camden) ward boundaries from 1965 to 1971

=== 1969 by-election ===
The by-election took place on 4 December 1969, following the resignation of Peter Brooke.

1969 Highgate by-election
| Party | Candidate | Votes | % | ±% |
|---|---|---|---|---|
| Conservative | Harriet Greenway | 1,426 | | |
| Labour | J. Needham | 1027 | | |
| Communist | J. Nicholson | 81 | | |
| Turnout | | | | |
| Conservative hold | | Swing | | |

=== 1968 election ===
The election took place on 9 May 1968.

1968 Camden London Borough Council election: Highgate
| Party | Candidate | Votes | % | ±% |
|---|---|---|---|---|
| Conservative | Peter Brooke | 2,185 | 59.4 | |
| Conservative | Ronald Walker | 2,165 | | |
| Conservative | Denis Friis | 2,119 | | |
| Labour | Peter Jonas | 1,275 | 35.1 | |
| Labour | John Palmer | 1,274 | | |
| Labour | Florence Freeman | 1,272 | | |
| Liberal | Joyce Arram | 216 | 3.9 | |
| Liberal | Richard Franklin | 207 | | |
| Communist | Winston Pinder | 174 | 1.6 | |
| Turnout | | | 47.9 | |
| Conservative hold | | Swing | | |
| Conservative hold | | Swing | | |
| Conservative hold | | Swing | | |

=== 1964 election ===
The election took place on 7 May 1964.

1964 Camden London Borough Council election: Highgate
| Party | Candidate | Votes | % | ±% |
|---|---|---|---|---|
| Conservative | Martin Morton | 2,067 | | |
| Conservative | William Brennan | 2,062 | | |
| Conservative | Roland Walker | 2,054 | | |
| Labour | Corin Hughes-Stanton | 1,465 | | |
| Labour | Richard Andrews | 1,440 | | |
| Labour | Ivy Tate | 1,380 | | |
| Communist | Walter Davis | 276 | | |
| Turnout | | 3,622 | 47.0 | |
| Conservative win (new seat) | | | | |
| Conservative win (new seat) | | | | |
| Conservative win (new seat) | | | | |
