= Chris Philp =

British politician (born 1976)

The Right Honourable Chris Philp MP
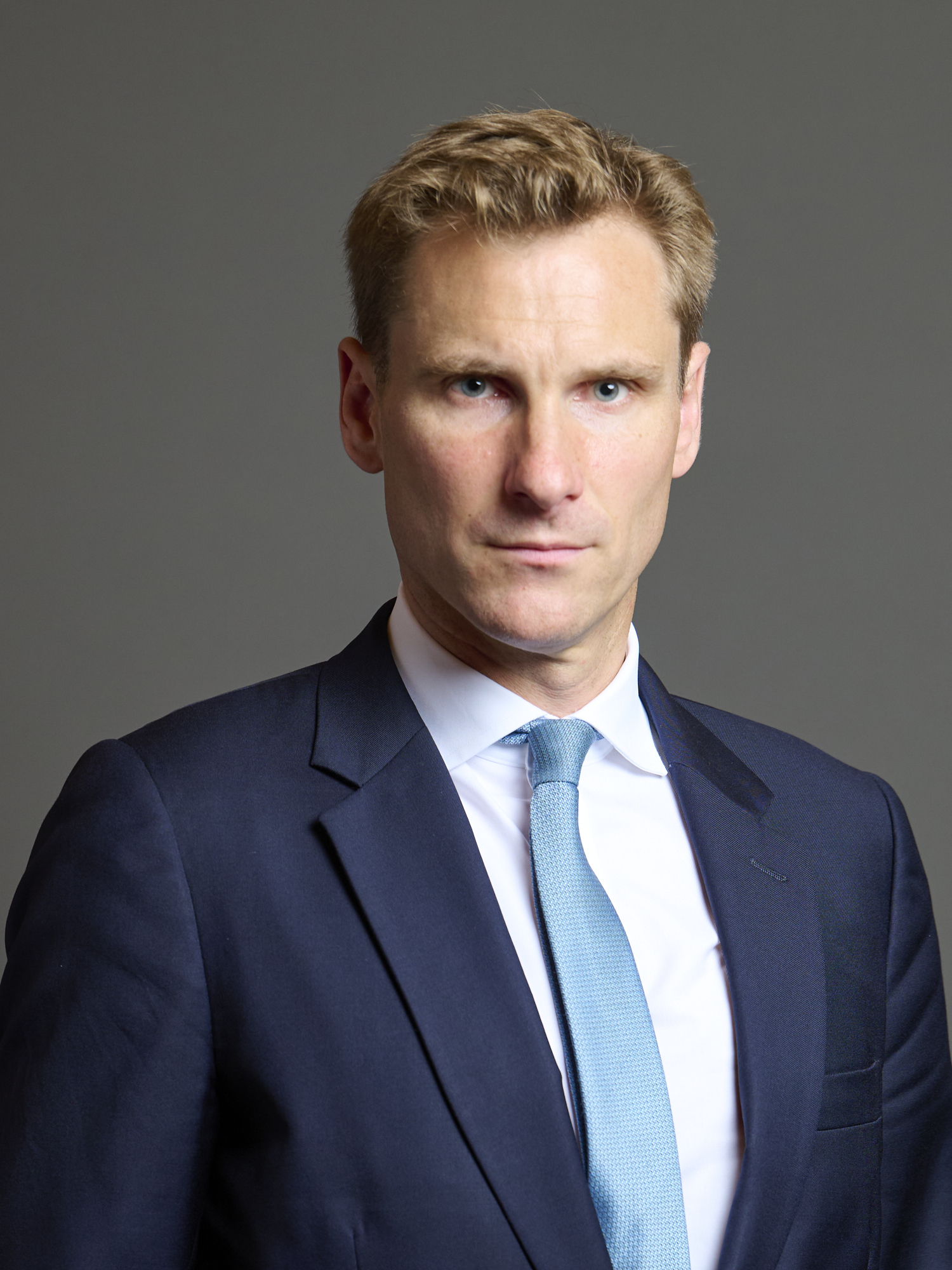
- Official portrait, 2024

Shadow Home Secretary
- Incumbent
- Assumed office 5 November 2024
- Leader: Kemi Badenoch
- Preceded by: James Cleverly

Shadow Leader of the House of Commons
- In office 8 July 2024 – 5 November 2024
- Leader: Rishi Sunak
- Preceded by: Lucy Powell
- Succeeded by: Jesse Norman
Junior ministerial offices
Minister of State for Crime, Policing and Fire
In office 26 October 2022 – 5 July 2024
Prime Minister	Rishi Sunak
Preceded by	Jeremy Quin
Succeeded by	Diana Johnson
Minister for the Cabinet Office Paymaster General
In office 14 October 2022 – 25 October 2022
Prime Minister	Liz Truss
Preceded by	Edward Argar
Succeeded by	Jeremy Quin
Chief Secretary to the Treasury
In office 6 September 2022 – 14 October 2022
Prime Minister	Liz Truss
Chancellor	Kwasi Kwarteng
Preceded by	Simon Clarke
Succeeded by	Edward Argar
Parliamentary Under-Secretary of State for Tech and the Digital Economy
In office 16 September 2021 – 7 July 2022
Prime Minister	Boris Johnson
Preceded by	Matt Warman
Succeeded by	Damian Collins
Minister for London
In office 18 December 2019 – 13 February 2020
Prime Minister	Boris Johnson
Preceded by	Nick Hurd
Succeeded by	Paul Scully
Parliamentary Under-Secretary of State for Immigration Compliance and Courts (Note: Jointly with the Home Office from February 2020.)
In office 10 September 2019 – 16 September 2021
Prime Minister	Boris Johnson
Preceded by	Edward Argar
Succeeded by	Tom Pursglove

Member of Parliament for Croydon South
- Incumbent
- Assumed office 7 May 2015
- Preceded by: Richard Ottaway
- Majority: 2,313 (4.7%)

Camden Borough Councillor for Gospel Oak
- In office 4 May 2006 – 6 May 2010
- Preceded by: Raj Chada
- Succeeded by: Theo Blackwell MBE

Personal details
- Born: Christopher Ian Brian Mynott Philp; 6 July 1976 (age 50) West Wickham, London, England
- Party: Conservative
- Spouse: Elizabeth Philp (m. 2009)
- Children: 2
- Education: University College, Oxford (MPhys)
- Website: www.chrisphilp.com

Christopher Ian Brian Mynott Philp (born 6 July 1976) is a British politician who has served as Shadow Home Secretary since November 2024. A member of the Conservative Party, he has been the Member of Parliament (MP) for Croydon South since 2015. The Minister of State for Crime, Policing and Fire from October 2022 to July 2024, Philp previously served in Liz Truss's Cabinet from September to October 2022 as Chief Secretary to the Treasury and then as Minister for the Cabinet Office and Paymaster-General.

In August 2019, Philp was appointed parliamentary private secretary to Chancellor of the Exchequer Sajid Javid. In September 2019, he was appointed by Prime Minister Boris Johnson as Parliamentary under-secretary of state at the Ministry of Justice and in February 2020 at the Home Office. He also served briefly as Minister for London from December 2019 to February 2020, before being moved to the position of Parliamentary Under-Secretary of State for Tech and the Digital Economy by Johnson in the September 2021 reshuffle. He resigned from ministerial office during the July 2022 government crisis.

After Johnson resigned in July 2022, Philp supported Liz Truss’s bid to become Conservative leader. Following Truss's appointment as Prime Minister, she promoted Philp to the Cabinet as Chief Secretary to the Treasury in September 2022. In October 2022, when Kwasi Kwarteng was dismissed as Chancellor as a result of his "mini-budget", Philp was demoted to Minister for the Cabinet Office and Paymaster-General. After Rishi Sunak succeeded Truss as Prime Minister, Philp became Minister of State at the Home Office until the end of the Conservative Government in July 2024.

In Opposition, Philp served as Shadow Leader of the House of Commons under Sunak's caretaker Shadow Cabinet before becoming Shadow Home Secretary in November 2024 following Kemi Badenoch's election to lead the Conservative Party and as Leader of HM Opposition.

== Early life and education ==
Christopher Philp was born at West Wickham, London, and attended St Olave's Grammar School in Orpington, Bromley, before studying physics at University College, Oxford, graduating with an MPhys in 1997.

In 1996 he was editor of the Oxford student newspaper, Cherwell. In 1996, while a second-year undergraduate at Oxford, Philp was fined and suspended by the Oxford Union for recording a controversial speech by OJ Simpson and selling copies to newspapers.

== Early career ==
Philp worked for McKinsey & Company before co-founding distribution business Blueheath Holdings, in 2000. It was floated on the AIM before being absorbed in a reverse takeover by the Booker Group in 2007.

In 2003 Philp received London's Emerging Entrepreneur of the Year Award from Ernst & Young and The Times.

With fellow future Conservative Party MP Sam Gyimah, he founded Clearstone Training & Recruitment Limited, an HGV training provider. Philp also founded property development lender Pluto Finance and Moreof Silverstone. He founded a charity The Next Big Thing, which wound up solvently in 2017.

Philp was elected Chairman of the Bow Group, a Conservative think tank, for 2004/05. Defeating the Labour Leader of Camden Council he was elected Councillor for the Gospel Oak Ward, Camden in May 2006 with a swing of over 10%, the first Conservative to represent the ward in over 20 years. He then stood down at the 2010 local elections.

Philp's book, Conservative Revival: Blueprint for a Better Britain, was published in conjunction with the Bow Group and was co-authored by 10 Conservative MPs, or recent candidates in their 30s, and had a foreword written by David Cameron, then Leader of HM Opposition. Philp is also the author of Work for the Dole: a Proposal to Fix Welfare Dependency, published by the Taxpayers' Alliance in September 2013. His report called for mandatory participation in community work and training in return for the continued payment of benefits payments.

== Parliamentary career ==
=== Parliamentary candidate ===
At the 2010 general election, Philp stood for Hampstead and Kilburn, coming second with 32.7% of the vote behind the incumbent Labour MP Glenda Jackson by 42 votes, the narrowest majority in the resulting House of Commons.

=== Cameron government ===
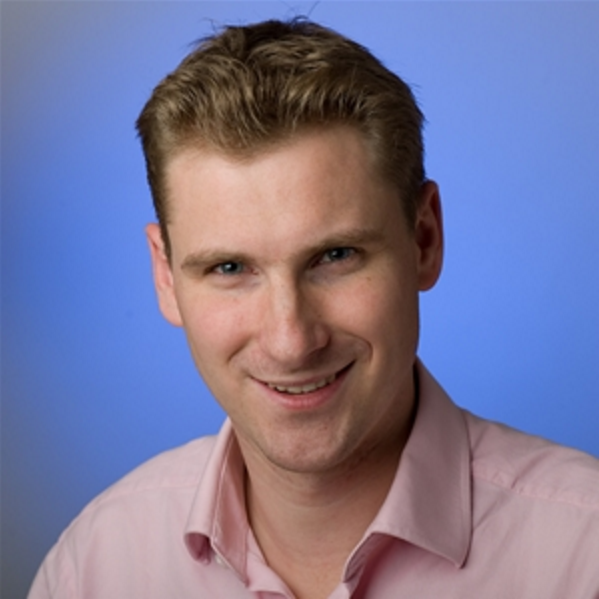
Philp in 2014

In November 2013, Philp was selected as the Conservative parliamentary candidate for Croydon South. At the 2015 general election, Philp was elected as MP for Croydon South with 54.5% of the vote and a majority of 17,140.

Shortly after entering the House of Commons, Philp became the first of the 2015 Conservative intake to be elected by fellow MPs to the influential Treasury Select Committee.

Philp supports selective grammar schools. In October 2015, he argued for one to open a satellite in Croydon to circumvent a ban in England on new selective schools and Croydon Council's own non-selective policy.

Philp opposed Brexit before the 2016 European membership referendum.

Philp has been an outspoken critic of Govia Thameslink Railway's ownership of Southern Rail; in 2017, Philp called for the Government to take control of the Southern Rail franchise and for cross-party support in ending disputes between Southern Rail and the RMT Union. He also proposed a private member's bill to ban "unreasonable" and "damaging" strikes on essential services, including trains.

=== May government ===
At the snap 2017 general election, Philp was returned as MP for Croydon South with a decreased vote share of 54.4% and a decreased majority of 11,406. After the general election, Philp was appointed a parliamentary private secretary (PPS) at HM Treasury.

Philp was made PPS to Sajid Javid then Secretary of State for Housing, Communities and Local Government on 22 January 2018. Between December 2018 to May 2019 he served as the Conservative Party Vice-Chairman for Policy.

In August 2019, he was appointed PPS to Sajid Javid, Chancellor of the Exchequer. Philp had backed Javid in the 2019 Conservative leadership election.

=== Johnson government ===
In September 2019, Philp was appointed Parliamentary Under-Secretary of State for Justice.

Philp was again returned at the 2019 general election, with a decreased vote share of 52.2% but an increased majority of 12,339. Following the general election, Philp was appointed Parliamentary Under-Secretary of State for Immigration Compliance and Courts. He replaced Matt Warman as Parliamentary Under-Secretary of State at the DCMS in September 2021.

On 7 July 2022, Philp resigned from Government in protest at Boris Johnson's leadership following a large number of other ministerial resignations during the July 2022 United Kingdom government crisis.

=== Truss government ===
Philp was appointed by Liz Truss as Chief Secretary to the Treasury and sworn of the Privy Council on 13 September 2022.

Shortly after Chancellor Kwasi Kwarteng announced the Government's 'mini-budget' on 23 September, Chris Philp as his deputy at HM Treasury, posted a tweet that prematurely celebrated the rise in the pound against the dollar, which read: "Great to see sterling strengthening on the back of the new UK Growth Plan." However, the pound's strength was short-lived, and it subsequently fell to a 37-year low against the dollar. This led to ridicule of Philp's tweet and he later deleted it stating: "It was an interesting move which I responded to". Speaking at the Conservative Party conference in early October, Philp defended the mini-budget giving it "9.5 out of 10" and rejected analyses which showed it disproportionally benefited high earners, despite him acknowledging that it did to the media only days before.

On 14 October, Truss dismissed Chancellor Kwasi Kwarteng and Philp from the Treasury after 38 days in office. Philp was demoted to Minister for the Cabinet Office and Paymaster General, positions that his successor Edward Argar previously held.

=== Sunak government ===
Upon the appointment of Rishi Sunak as Prime Minister on 25 October 2022, Philp left the Cabinet to become Minister of State for Crime, Policing and Fire at the Home Office, in a straight job swap with Jeremy Quin. He held this post until the defeat of the Conservative Party at the 2024 general election.

In September 2023, it was reported that Philp was a member of a Facebook group "Croydon say no to ULEZ expansion". It was reported that some of the group's members celebrated the vandalism of ULEZ cameras. Philp responded by stating: "I completely condemn law-breaking and criminal damage."

In 2024, Philp opposed the construction of a small block of flats on the plot of one family home in Purley, siding with a local residents' association. The proposed building was in a residential area dominated by large single-family housing. Philp argued: "New homes are needed but the right place for new flats is Croydon town centre, central London and brownfield sites." However, commentators noted that the lot in question was a brownfield site.

On an episode of Question Time, broadcast by the BBC on 25 April 2024, Philp discussed the Government's new policy on sending migrants to Rwanda. When questioned by an audience member, Philp appeared to confuse Rwanda with the Democratic Republic of the Congo and seemed unsure as to their sovereign status. Philp later said that the question was rhetorical given his difficulty hearing the original question.

=== In Opposition ===
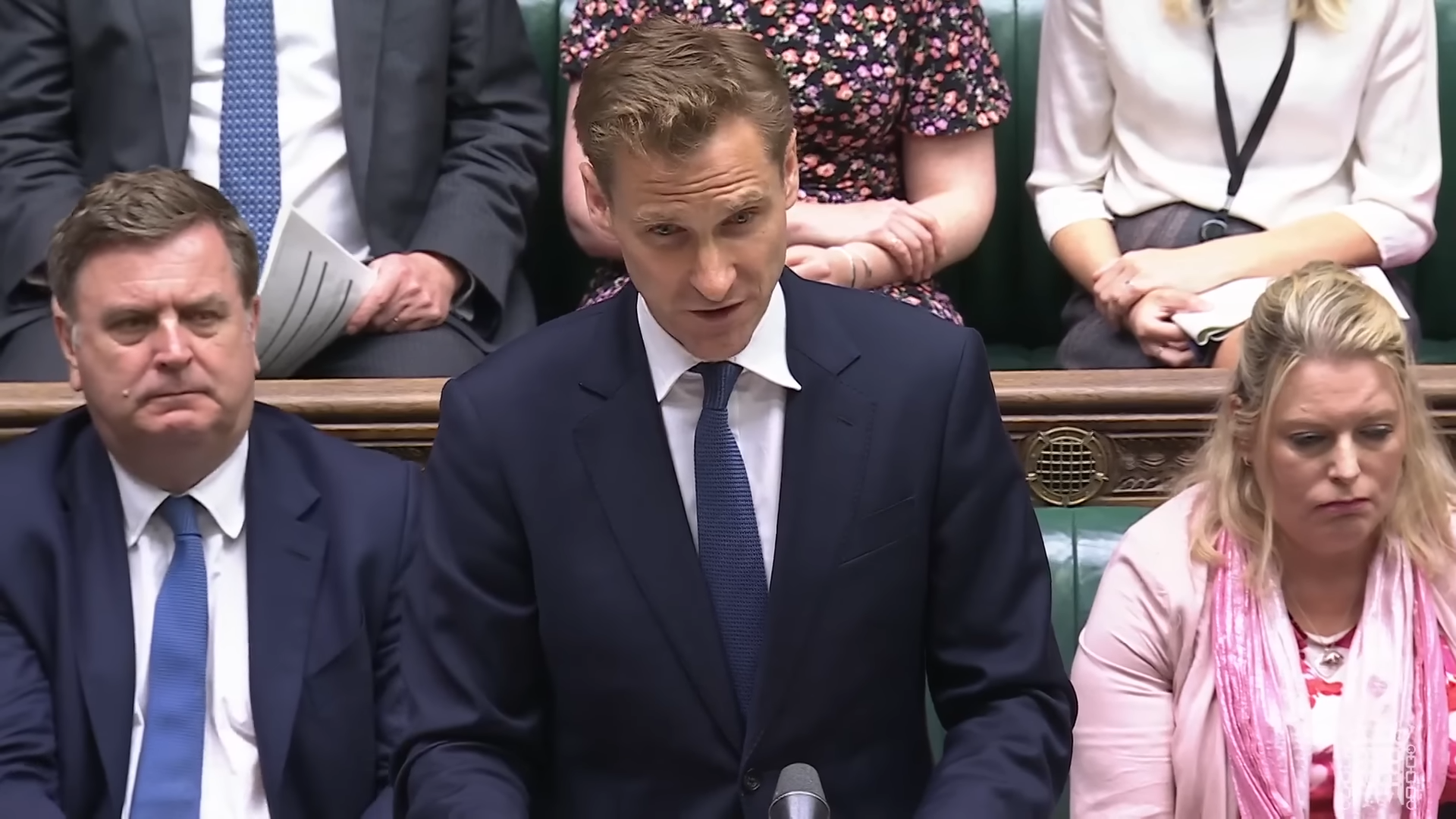
Philp during Prime Minister's Questions in July 2025

Philp retained his seat in the 2024 general election, but with a reduced majority of 2,313 compared to 12,339 at the previous general election. Following the Conservative Party's defeat at the 2024 general election and the subsequent formation of the Starmer ministry, Philp was appointed Shadow Leader of the House of Commons in Rishi Sunak's caretaker Shadow Cabinet.

On 5 November, newly-elected Leader of HM Opposition, Kemi Badenoch, appointed Philp as Shadow Home Secretary.

After Rupert Lowe MP was suspended from the Reform UK whip, Philp defended him, saying: “Rupert Lowe has been treated appallingly by Reform and by Nigel Farage in particular [and that he has been] subject to all kinds of vicious and vitriolic attacks", and invited Lowe to defect to the Conservatives.

In August 2025, in relation to the acquittal of Labour Councillor Ricky Jones on a charge of inciting violent disorder, Philp said: "It is astonishing that this Labour councillor, who was caught on video calling for throats to be slit, is let off scot-free, whereas Lucy Connolly got 31 months prison for posting something no worse". Lucy Connolly, wife of a Conservative West Northamptonshire Councillor, pleaded guilty at Northampton Crown Court in September 2024 to the charge she faced thereby admitting she had intended to stir up racial hatred. Councillor Jones denied the offence he faced and was found not guilty by jury at Snaresbrook Crown Court.

== Personal life ==
Philp married his wife Elizabeth in 2009. Their twins, a son and a daughter, were born prematurely in April 2013, and spent an extended period in intensive care. His father Brian Philp stood as the UKIP prospective parliamentary candidate for Orpington at the 2017 general election.

In June 2024, it was announced that Philp's wife, Elizabeth, was being sued over allegations of corporate espionage. She was accused of illegally using confidential information from her former employer to set up a rival business. When questioned about the case at a local hustings, Philp acknowledged the ongoing case, but declined to confirm or deny whether he was a stakeholder in the business.

== Notes ==
Parliament of the United Kingdom
Preceded by Richard Ottaway	Member of Parliament for Croydon South; 2015–present	Incumbent
Political offices
Preceded by Simon Clarke	Chief Secretary to the Treasury; 2022	Succeeded by Edward Argar
Preceded by Edward Argar	Minister for the Cabinet Office; 2022	Succeeded by Jeremy Quin
Preceded by Edward Argar	Paymaster General; 2022	Succeeded by Jeremy Quin
Preceded by Lucy Powell	Shadow Leader of the House of Commons; 2024	Succeeded by Jesse Norman
Preceded by James Cleverly	Shadow Home Secretary; 2024–present	Incumbent
