= Haverstock (ward) =

Electoral ward in the London Borough of Camden

- Electoral ward for the Camden London Borough Council
- Haverstock ward boundaries since 2022
- Borough: Camden
- County: Greater London
- Population: 12,038 (2021) (Note: 2021 Census data reported for 2022 ward boundaries)
- Electorate: 5,964 (2022)
- Area: 0.7532 square kilometres (0.2908 sq mi) (2022)

Current electoral ward
- Created: 2002
- Number of members: 3
- Councillors: Kemi Atolagbe; Rebecca Filer; Nasrine Djemai
- ONS code: 00AGGM (2002–2022)
- GSS code: E05000136 (2002–2022); E05013660 (2022–present)

Haverstock is an electoral ward in the London Borough of Camden. The ward was created in 2002 and was first used in the 2002 elections. It returns three councillors to Camden London Borough Council. It was subject to a boundary revision in 2022. It has been represented by the Labour Party for most of its history, with the Liberal Democrats winning seats at elections from 2003 to 2010.

== List of councillors ==
Seat	Councillor	Took office	Left office	Party	Election
1	Jane Roberts	2002	2006	Labour	2002
2	Roy Shaw	2002	2007	Labour	2002, 2006
3	John Dickie	2002	2003	Labour	2002
3	Jill Fraser	2003	2014	Liberal Democrats	2003, 2006, 2010
1	Syed Hoque (Note: Syed Hoque changed parties in 2009.)	2006	2010	Labour	2006
2	Matt Sanders	2007	2014	Liberal Democrats	2007, 2006, 2010
1	Rahel Bokth	2010	2014	Liberal Democrats	2010
1	Alison Kelly	2014	2022	Labour	2014, 2018
2	Abdul Quadir	2014	2022	Labour	2014, 2018
3	Abi Wood	2014	2019	Labour	2014
3	Gail McAnena Wood	2019	2022	Labour	2019
1	Kemi Atolagbe	2022	Incumbent	Labour	2022, 2026
2	Rebecca Filer	2022	Incumbent	Labour	2022, 2026
3	Nasrine Djemai	2022	Incumbent	Labour	2022, 2026

== Summary ==
Councillors elected by party at each general borough election.

- Labour
- Liberal Democrats

== Camden council elections since 2022 ==
There was a revision of ward boundaries in Camden in 2022.

=== 2026 election ===
The election took place on 7 May 2026.

2026 Camden London Borough Council election: Haverstock
Party	Candidate	Votes	%	±%
Labour	Kemi Atolagbe	1,366		
Labour	Rebecca Filer	1,322		
Labour	Nasrine Djemai	1,255		
Green	Mohamed Farah	1,209		
Green	Andrej Mecava	1,117		
Green	Aziz Hakimi	1,034		
Liberal Democrats	Katharine Burge	351		
Conservative	Josh Mackenzie-Lawrie	320		
Conservative	John Webber	319		
Reform	Robert Wheater	313		
Reform	Aindrias Ōh-Ēineagāin	300		
Conservative	Alex Williams	298		
Liberal Democrats	Joseph Tobin	259		
Liberal Democrats	Alidad Moaveni	220		
Turnout			37.99	+6.69
Labour hold		Swing		
Labour hold		Swing		
Labour hold		Swing		

=== 2022 election ===
The election took place on 5 May 2022.

2022 Camden London Borough Council election: Haverstock
Party	Candidate	Votes	%	±%
Labour	Kemi Atolagbe	1,523	56.7	
Labour	Rebecca Filer	1,430	53.2	
Labour	Nasrine Djemai	1,402	52.2	
Green	Peter McGinty	643	23.9	
Liberal Democrats	Jill Fraser	427	15.9	
Liberal Democrats	Fiona Fraser	368	13.7	
Liberal Democrats	Diane Culligan	313	11.6	
Conservative	Timothy Frost	312	11.6	
Conservative	David Roberts	294	10.9	
Conservative	Shreena Parkinson	292	10.9	
Independent	Alice Brown	278	10.3	
Independent	Mohamed Farah	232	8.6	
Turnout		2,687	31.3	
Labour win (new boundaries)				
Labour win (new boundaries)				
Labour win (new boundaries)				

== 2002–2022 Camden council elections ==
Haverstock ward boundaries from 2002 to 2022

=== 2019 by-election ===
The by-election took place on 12 December 2019, following the resignation of Abi Wood.

2019 Haverstock by-election
Party	Candidate	Votes	%	±%
Labour	Gail McAnena Wood	3,121	57.1	
Green	Hunter Watts	787	14.4	
Conservative	Catherine McQueen	781	14.3	
Liberal Democrats	Jack Fleming	776	14.2	
Majority		2,334	42.7	
Turnout		5,465		
Labour hold		Swing		

=== 2018 election ===
The election took place on 3 May 2018.

2018 Camden London Borough Council election: Haverstock
Party	Candidate	Votes	%	±%
Labour	Alison Kelly	1,814	61.6	▲14.8
Labour	Abdul Quadir	1,653	56.1	▲12.9
Labour	Abi Wood	1,606	54.5	▲14.4
Liberal Democrats	Jill Fraser	661	22.4	▼7.2
Liberal Democrats	Jack Fleming	412	14.0	▼12.7
Green	Pam Walker	401	13.6	▲1.1
Liberal Democrats	Yannick Bultingaire	383	13.0	▼12.0
Conservative	Daniel Ellis	354	12.0	▲2.4
Conservative	Tom Ewins	321	10.9	▲1.6
Green	Mike Sumner	317	10.8	▲0.9
Conservative	Rahoul Bhansali	305	10.4	▲2.4
Green	Mike Turner	241	8.2	▼1.6
Majority		945		
Turnout			33.6	▼8.9
Labour hold		Swing		
Labour hold		Swing		
Labour hold		Swing		

=== 2014 election ===
The election took place on 22 May 2014.

2014 Camden London Borough Council election: Haverstock
Party	Candidate	Votes	%	±%
Labour	Alison Kelly	1,707	46.8	
Labour	Abdul Quadir	1,578	43.2	
Labour	Abi Wood	1,462	40.1	
Liberal Democrats	Jill Fraser	1,081	29.6	
Liberal Democrats	Matt Sanders	976	26.7	
Liberal Democrats	Rahel Bokth	913	25.0	
Green	Charlotte Collins	456	12.5	
Green	Una Sapietis	361	9.9	
Green	Andre Lopez-Turner	356	9.8	
Conservative	Stephen Daughton	351	9.6	
Conservative	Nathan Davidson	339	9.3	
UKIP	Christopher Cooke	315	8.6	
Conservative	Carole Ricketts	291	8.0	
Majority		381		
Turnout		10,206	42.5	▲6.3
Labour gain from Liberal Democrats		Swing		
Labour gain from Liberal Democrats		Swing		
Labour gain from Liberal Democrats		Swing		

=== 2010 election ===
The general election of councillors took place on 6 May 2010. The vote for Haverstock was postponed until 25 May 2010, following the death of Syed Hoque.

2010 Camden London Borough Council election: Haverstock
Party	Candidate	Votes	%	±%
Liberal Democrats	Jill Fraser	1,462		
Liberal Democrats	Matt Sanders	1,326		
Liberal Democrats	Rahel Bokth	1,291		
Labour	Sabrina Francis	1,257		
Labour	Tom Copley	1,202		
Labour	Joynal Uddin	1,114		
Conservative	Joan Stally	259		
Conservative	Tom Frost	250		
Green	Jane Lawrie	246		
Green	Paul Grader	240		
Conservative	Robert Ricketts	236		
Green	Sean Thompson	181		
Majority		34		
Turnout		9,064	36.2	
Liberal Democrats hold		Swing		
Liberal Democrats gain from Labour		Swing		
Liberal Democrats gain from Labour		Swing		

=== 2007 by-election ===
The by-election took place on 12 July 2007, after the resignation of Roy Shaw.

2007 Haverstock by-election
Party	Candidate	Votes	%	±%
Liberal Democrats	Matt Sanders	1,160	43.4	▼0.2
Labour	Mike Katz	1,000	37.4	▲3.0
Green	Emily Bruni	299	11.2	▲0.4
Conservative	Peter Horne	213	8.0	▼3.2
Majority		160	6.0	
Turnout		2,672	34.1	
Liberal Democrats gain from Labour		Swing		

=== 2006 election ===
The election took place on 4 May 2006.

2006 Camden London Borough Council election: Haverstock
Party	Candidate	Votes	%	±%
Liberal Democrats	Jill Fraser	1,417		
Labour	Syed Hoque	1,118		
Labour	Roy Shaw	1,106		
Liberal Democrats	Dudley Miles	1,085		
Liberal Democrats	Simon Horvat-Marcovic	1,058		
Labour	Mike Katz	1,034		
Conservative	Joan Stally	362		
Green	Sue Charlesworth	351		
Green	Robert Bahns	347		
Conservative	Timothy Frost	338		
Conservative	Ross McGregor	337		
Green	Edward Milford	244		
Turnout		8,797	38.3	
Liberal Democrats gain from Labour		Swing		
Labour hold		Swing		
Labour hold		Swing		

=== 2003 by-election ===
The by-election took place on 20 February 2003, following the resignation of John Dickie.

2003 Haverstock by-election
Party	Candidate	Votes	%	±%
Liberal Democrats	Jill Fraser	746	42.8	▲22.0
Labour	Paul Thomson	484	27.8	▼15.8
Conservative	Peter Horne	318	18.2	▲0.1
Green	Sarah Gillam	112	6.4	▼9.4
Socialist Alliance	Sydney Platt	84	4.8	▲4.8
Majority		262	15.0	
Turnout		1,744	23.2	
Liberal Democrats gain from Labour		Swing		

=== 2002 election ===
The election took place on 2 May 2002.

2002 Camden London Borough Council election: Haverstock
Party	Candidate	Votes	%	±%
Labour	Jane Roberts	882	47.3	N/A
Labour	Roy Shaw	856	45.9	N/A
Labour	John Dickie	852	45.7	N/A
Liberal Democrats	Margaret Finer	422	22.6	N/A
Conservative	Rita Marshall	367	19.7	N/A
Liberal Democrats	Alec Gordon	364	19.5	N/A
Liberal Democrats	Pamela Lutgen	359	19.3	N/A
Conservative	Anthony Kemp	355	19.0	N/A
Conservative	Joan Stally	351	18.8	N/A
Green	Sarah Gillam	319	17.1	N/A
Green	Iola Kenworthy	277	14.9	N/A
Green	Edward Milford	201	10.8	N/A
CPA	Angela Ozor	34	1.8	N/A
Majority		430	23.1	N/A
Turnout		1,864	24.6	N/A
Registered electors		7,571		
Labour win (new seat)				
Labour win (new seat)				
Labour win (new seat)				
