= Siân Berry =

British politician (born 1974)

Siân Berry MP
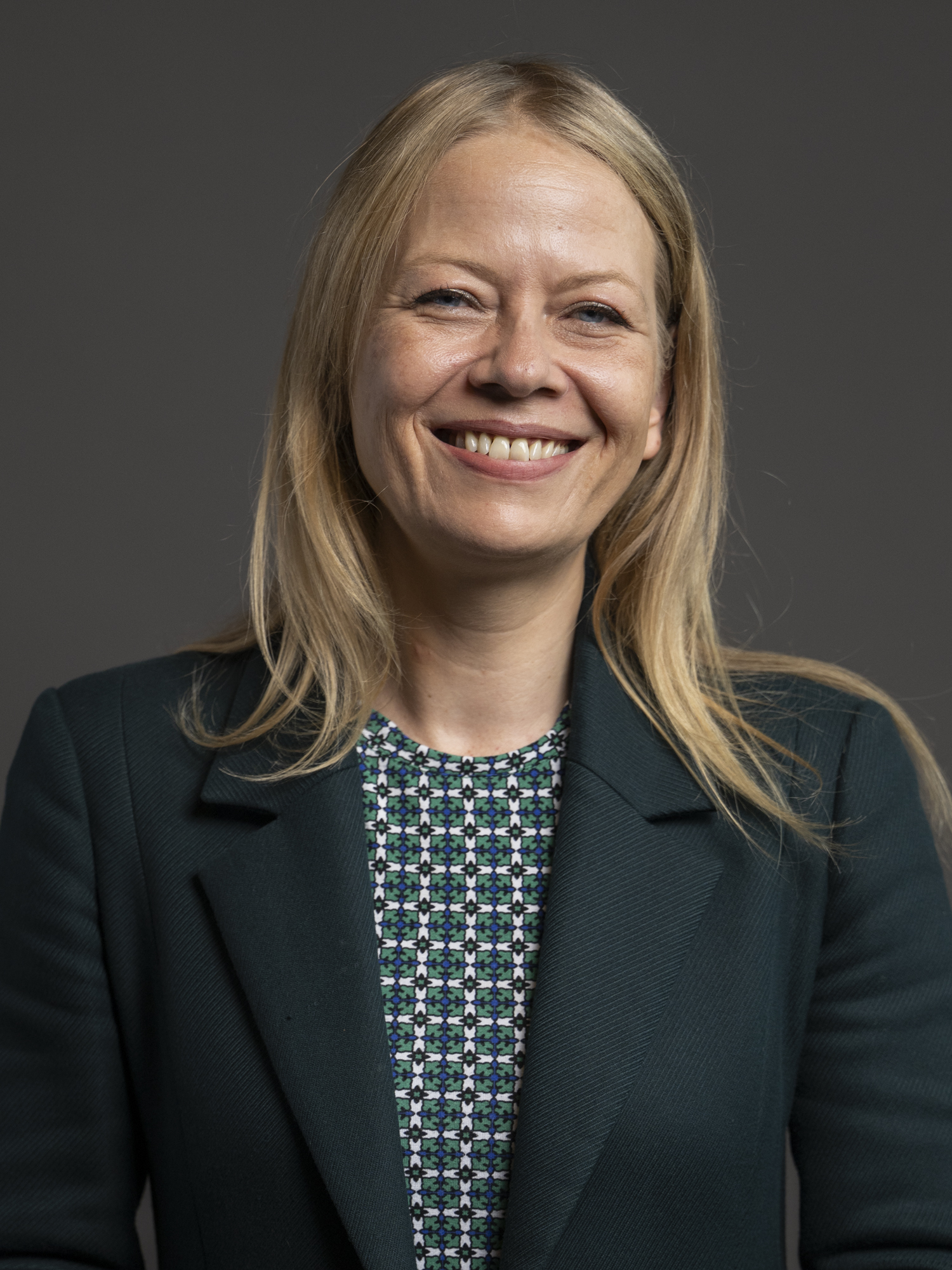
- Official portrait, 2024

Member of Parliament for Brighton Pavilion
- Incumbent
- Assumed office 4 July 2024
- Preceded by: Caroline Lucas
- Majority: 14,290 (27.3%)

Chief Whip of the Green Party in the House of Commons
- Incumbent
- Assumed office 1 June 2026

Co-leader of the Green Party of England and Wales
- In office 4 September 2018 – 1 October 2021 Serving with Jonathan Bartley (2018–2021)
- Deputy: Amelia Womack
- Preceded by: Caroline Lucas
- Succeeded by: Carla Denyer and Adrian Ramsay

Leader of the Greens in the London Assembly
- In office 6 May 2016 – 19 October 2018
- Leader: Natalie Bennett; Caroline Lucas; Jonathan Bartley; Herself
- Preceded by: Jenny Jones
- Succeeded by: Caroline Russell

Principal Speaker of the Green Party
- In office 24 November 2006 – 30 November 2007 Serving with Derek Wall
- Preceded by: Caroline Lucas
- Succeeded by: Caroline Lucas

Member of the London Assembly as an additional member
- In office 6 May 2016 – 7 May 2024

Camden London Borough Councillor for Highgate
- In office 22 May 2014 – 20 October 2023
- Preceded by: Maya De Souza
- Succeeded by: Lorna Jane Russell

Personal details
- Born: Siân Rebecca Berry; 9 July 1974 (age 52) Cheltenham, Gloucestershire, England
- Party: Green Party of England and Wales
- Education: Pate's Grammar School; Trinity College, Oxford (MEng)
- Website: sianberry.org.uk

Siân Rebecca Berry (/ʃɑːn/; born 9 July 1974) is a British politician who has served as the Member of Parliament for Brighton Pavilion since July 2024, succeeding Caroline Lucas. She was a co-leader of the Green Party of England and Wales alongside Jonathan Bartley from 2018 to 2021, and was its sole leader from July to October 2021. From 2006 to 2007, she was one of the Green Party's principal speakers.

Berry was a member of the London Assembly (AM) from 2016 until she resigned in 2024, serving as a London-wide member elected under the additional-member system. She also served as a Green Party councillor on Camden Council, representing Highgate until October 2023.

== Early life and career ==
Berry was born on 9 July 1974, and brought up in Cheltenham, Gloucestershire. She was educated at Pate's Grammar School, a state grammar school in Cheltenham, where her parents were teachers. She studied metallurgy and the science of materials at Trinity College, Oxford, graduating with a master of engineering degree (MEng). Upon graduating in 1997, she moved to London.

Berry worked as a medical copywriter. From June 2011 to late 2015, Berry worked as a roads and sustainable transport campaigner for the charity Campaign for Better Transport.

== Green Party politician ==
Berry joined the Green Party aged 27. In her first major party political role as the party's campaigns co-ordinator, Berry led the Green Energy Works campaign, calling for low carbon, non-nuclear energy to tackle climate change. She also led a campaign against the renewal of Britain's nuclear weapon, the Trident submarine, travelling to the nuclear submarine base in Faslane, Scotland, to protest.

Berry failed to be elected to Camden London Borough Council three times: once during 2002 and twice in 2006. In the 2002 local elections, she came fifth in the Highgate ward with 811 votes, 38 votes behind the third place required to gain a seat. The 2006 local elections saw her contest the neighbouring Kentish Town ward, in which she gained 1,057 votes and came sixth out of 12. A 7 December 2006 by-election in Kentish Town ward saw her come second out of four with 812 votes, behind the Liberal Democrat winner on 1,093 votes.

In 2005, Berry was the Green Party's parliamentary candidate for the Hampstead and Highgate constituency (which included Highgate ward) at that year's general election. She received 5.3% of the vote, coming fourth; the seat was held by Labour's Glenda Jackson.

Berry was elected as the Green Party's female Principal Speaker unopposed in autumn 2006, succeeding Caroline Lucas MEP and, working alongside male Principal Speaker Derek Wall, served until autumn 2007 when Lucas resumed the post following an election. She wrote a regular blog for the New Statesman magazine from November 2006 to July 2008.

On 12 March 2007, the Green Party announced that Berry would be the party's candidate in the 2008 London mayoral election, after she received 45% of the votes in the London Green Party's internal election. Berry recommended that her voters back Labour Party candidate Ken Livingstone as their second preference and Livingstone advocated an equivalent preference for his supporters. Berry was endorsed by the Independent and Observer newspapers, with Ken Livingstone as second preference. Berry came fourth, with 3.15% of first preferences and 13.5% of second preferences.

=== Camden Council ===
In the 2014 local elections, Berry was elected to the Highgate ward of Camden London Borough Council, holding the seat of outgoing Green councillor Maya De Souza in a split result for the ward. Berry has supported local services in Camden threatened by redevelopment projects. She has advocated "green development" in Kings Cross Railwaylands (the largest brownfield site in the UK) to provide more family housing.

=== London Assembly ===
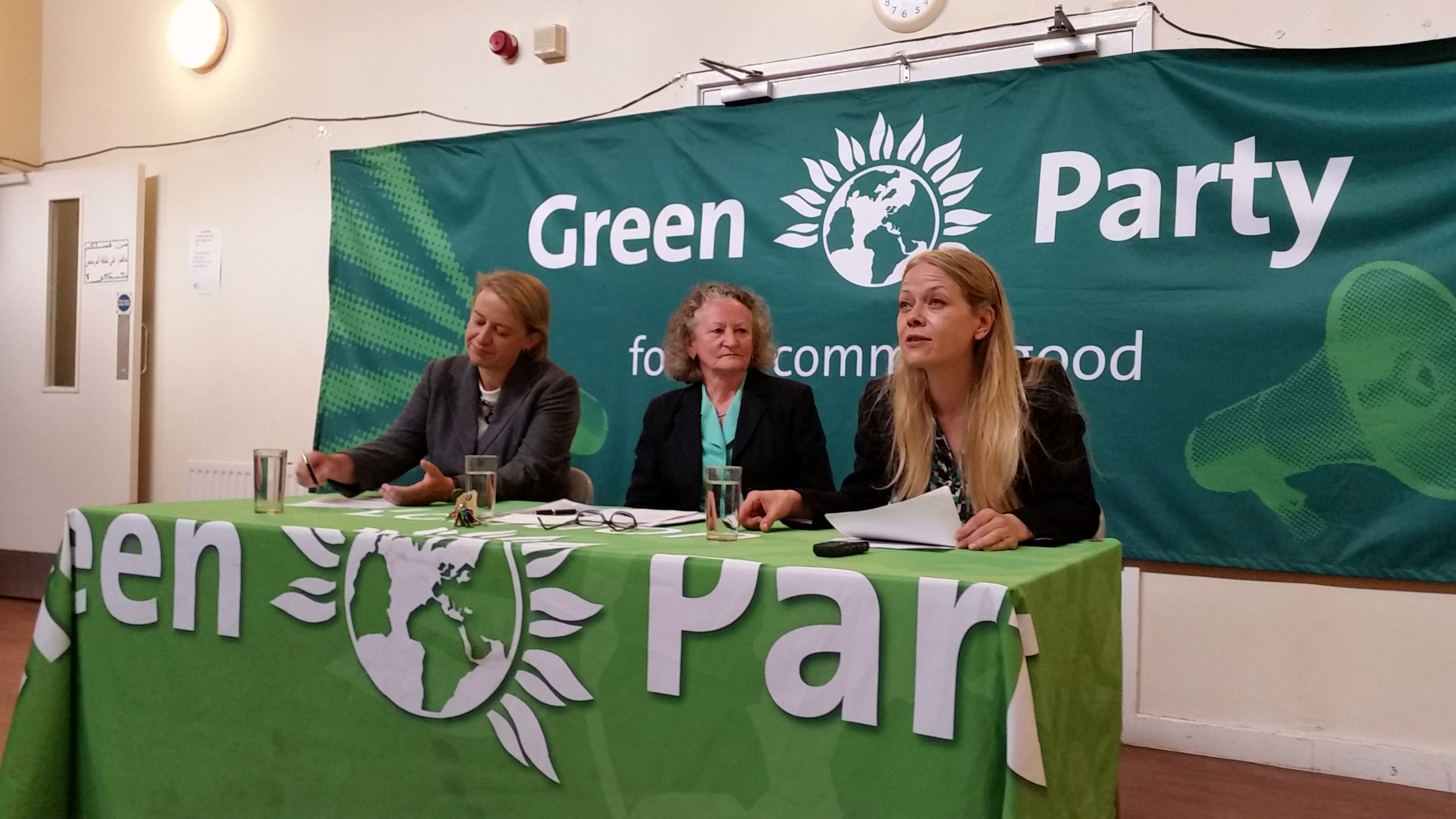
Berry (right), with Natalie Bennett and Jenny Jones, in 2015

On 2 September, it was announced that she had won the internal party election to stand as the Greens' London mayoral candidate and first place list candidate for the London Assembly elections in 2016. She was one of the few candidates in the race to rent rather than own her home and made private renters' rights a centrepiece of her campaign. She was described by The Guardian's London specialist Dave Hill as having "like her party, grown more formidable with experience".

Berry came third in the first preference voting round for the mayoralty, and thus did not make it to the second round. However, she was elected to the London Assembly as one of two Green members.

At the 2017 general election, Berry stood as the Green candidate for Holborn and St Pancras, which includes her Highgate ward. She finished fourth, and the party lost its deposit in the seat, which was retained for Labour by Keir Starmer.

At the May 2021 London Assembly elections, delayed by a year owing to the COVID-19 pandemic, Berry was re-elected. The same month, alongside celebrities and other public figures, Berry was a signatory to an open letter published in Stylist magazine which called on the government to address what it described as an "epidemic of male violence" by funding an "ongoing, high-profile, expert-informed awareness campaign on men's violence against women and girls".

On 14 July 2021, Berry announced she would stand down as the Green Party's co-leader, citing an internal party conflict over transgender rights and stating that "there is now an inconsistency between the sincere promise to fight for trans rights and inclusion in my work and the message sent by the party's choice of frontbench representatives".

In August 2023, she announced her candidacy for the 2024 London Assembly election, to be held in May 2024. Berry won a seat, but resigned three days later to hand it to Zoë Garbett, who had come fourth in the 2024 London mayoral election, for which she was criticised.

=== House of Commons ===
On 13 June 2023, Berry announced her intention to stand to be the Green Party's prospective parliamentary candidate for Brighton Pavilion constituency, which was being vacated by incumbent Green MP Caroline Lucas. On 19 July 2023, she was confirmed as the Green candidate, having secured 71% of first preference votes.

On her selection she said that "Labour's lurch to the right would help the Greens hold the seat". This raised questions about whether she would continue as a councillor, after saying "I will work every moment between now and the general election" in Brighton Pavilion. On 20 October 2023, Berry stood down as a councillor in Camden to focus on her general election campaign in Brighton Pavilion.

In the 2024 general election, Berry was elected Member of Parliament (MP) for Brighton Pavilion with 28,809 votes (54.8%) and a majority of 14,290 over the second placed Labour candidate, Gomez vocalist Tom Gray. The Greens would win a further three seats for their best election result: Ellie Chowns and Green co-leaders Carla Denyer and Adrian Ramsay joined Berry as first-time MPs, making them amongst the party's first five MPs ever alongside the retiring Lucas. She made her maiden speech on 17 July 2024 during the debate following the King's Speech.

Berry has served as the Green Party's chief whip and Green spokesperson for home affairs since June 2026, alongside spokesperson roles for justice, transport, work and pensions, and democratic standards since July 2024. She served on public bill committees considering the Public Authorities (Fraud, Error and Recovery) Bill, Bus Services (No. 2) Bill, English Devolution and Community Empowerment Bill and Courts and Tribunals Bill between February 2025 and April 2026.

Berry was a co-sponsor of Kim Leadbeater's Terminally Ill Adults (End of Life) Bill on assisted suicide in the 2024–26 session. She is a vice chair of the All-Party Parliamentary Group on council and social housing and an officer of the APPGs on eating disorders and humanism – and was primary sponsor of early day motion 122, UK digital sovereignty strategy, tabled in May 2026, which called for a binding government strategy to strengthen the resilience and autonomy of public sector digital infrastructure.

== Advocacy ==
=== Environmentalism ===
Berry was a founder of the Alliance against Urban 4×4s, which began in Camden in 2003 and became a national campaign demanding measures to stop 4×4s (or sport utility vehicles) "taking over our cities". The campaign is known for its "theatrical demonstrations" and mock parking tickets, credited to Berry (although now adapted by numerous local groups), some 150,000 of which have been placed on 4×4 vehicles by campaigners. The group was successful in getting the Mayor of London Ken Livingstone to adopt one of its founding principles when he introduced a higher congestion charge for vehicles with high emissions. The Alliance campaigns further for greater taxes and stricter controls on advertisements for 4×4s. An international '4×4 Network' has now been founded.

In 2009, she was a driving force behind the Reheat Britain campaign for boiler scrappage which secured funding to replace some of the most inefficient boilers in the UK through the 2009 annual Pre Budget Report.

=== Anti-war ===
Berry has also campaigned against the Iraq War. She initiated the Census Alert campaign to stop Lockheed Martin from running the UK Census.

=== Humanism ===
Berry is a humanist and a patron of Humanists UK (formerly the British Humanist Association), a UK charity representing non-religious people who want a secular state. On 15 September 2010, Berry, along with 54 other public figures, signed a BHA open letter published in The Guardian, stating their opposition to Pope Benedict XVI's state visit to the UK. In a 2021 video recorded for Humanists UK's 125th anniversary, Berry stated humanism was "an approach to life shaped by a rational, evidence-based understanding of our society and the problems we face – not only as individuals, but collectively" and rooted in "concern for other living beings, for our planet, and for future generations". Following the 2024 general election, Berry was elected vice chair of the All Party Parliamentary Humanist Group. Later that year, she was elected the honorary president of the Green Humanists.

=== Other activism ===
She is a patron of the Fair Pay Network. She has campaigned against genetically modified foods.

== Criminal justice concerns ==
In April 2016, it was reported that Berry had been monitored by the National Domestic Extremism and Disorder Intelligence Unit, in apparent contradiction of assurances by Bernard Hogan-Howe, Commissioner of the Metropolitan Police, that the unit would not target peaceful campaigners. In 2019, Berry told Sky News she has previously taken drugs, including cocaine.

== Author ==
Berry is also author of a number of books, including 50 Ways to Greener Travel, 50 Ways to be a Greener Shopper, 50 Ways to Save Water and Energy and 50 Ways to make your house and garden greener. In 2010, she published Mend it! and in 2011 Junk for Joy on upcycling projects.

Party political offices
Preceded by Caroline Lucas	Principal Speaker of the Green Party of England and Wales; 2006–2007	Succeeded by Caroline Lucas
Preceded by Caroline Lucas; Jonathan Bartley	Leader of the Green Party of England and Wales; 2018–2021; With: Jonathan Bartley	Succeeded by Carla Denyer; Adrian Ramsay
Parliament of the United Kingdom
Preceded by Caroline Lucas	Member of Parliament for Brighton Pavilion; 2024–present	Incumbent
