= Richard Arthur (British politician) =

British Labour politician

Leader of Camden Council
- In office 1993–2000
- Preceded by: Julie Fitzgerald
- Succeeded by: Jane Roberts

Labour Group Leader on Camden Council
- In office 1993–2000
- Preceded by: Julie Fitzgerald
- Succeeded by: Jane Roberts

Camden councillor for Highgate
- In office 1990–2002

Personal details
- Party: Labour

Richard Andrew Arthur (born 24 March 1944) is a former Labour politician in England. He was the Leader of Camden London Borough Council from 1993 to 2000 and a councillor for Bloomsbury (1971–1974), Belsize (1974–1976) and Highgate (1990–2002).

== Personal life ==
Arthur was born on 24 March 1944 to Cicely Gertrude Arthur (née Blackman, 11 May 1905 – July 1996) and Cyril Stuart Arthur (15 January 1907 – 31 March 1986). He has an MA in economics from Cambridge and an MSc in business from the London Business School. Arthur married Diana Thompson in 1968 and the couple had one son and one daughter before being divorced. In 1986 he married again to Akiko Shindo. Arthur lives in Highgate, London. He lists his recreations as swimming, gardening, reading, travel and tai ji.

== Political career ==
Arthur was first elected to Camden Council in 1971 representing the Bloomsbury ward. At the next election, in 1974, he moved to be elected in the Belsize ward, before resigning from the council in 1974. He moved to Singapore for ten years. Arthur was elected to Camden Council for a second time in 1990, representing Highgate ward. He became the Leader of the council in 1993, replacing Julie Fitzgerald, beating Phil Turner by just three votes. Arthur was the longest serving Leader of the Council in Camden's history before being replaced by Jane Roberts in 2000. He then unsuccessfully stood to be the Labour candidate for Barnet and Camden on the newly created Greater London Authority. Arthur stood down as a councillor in 2002.

Arthur was the Chairman of the Camden and Islington NHS Foundation Trust from 2009 to 2013.
