= Jane Roberts (politician) =

British psychiatrist and politician (born 1955)

Dame Jane Roberts DBE
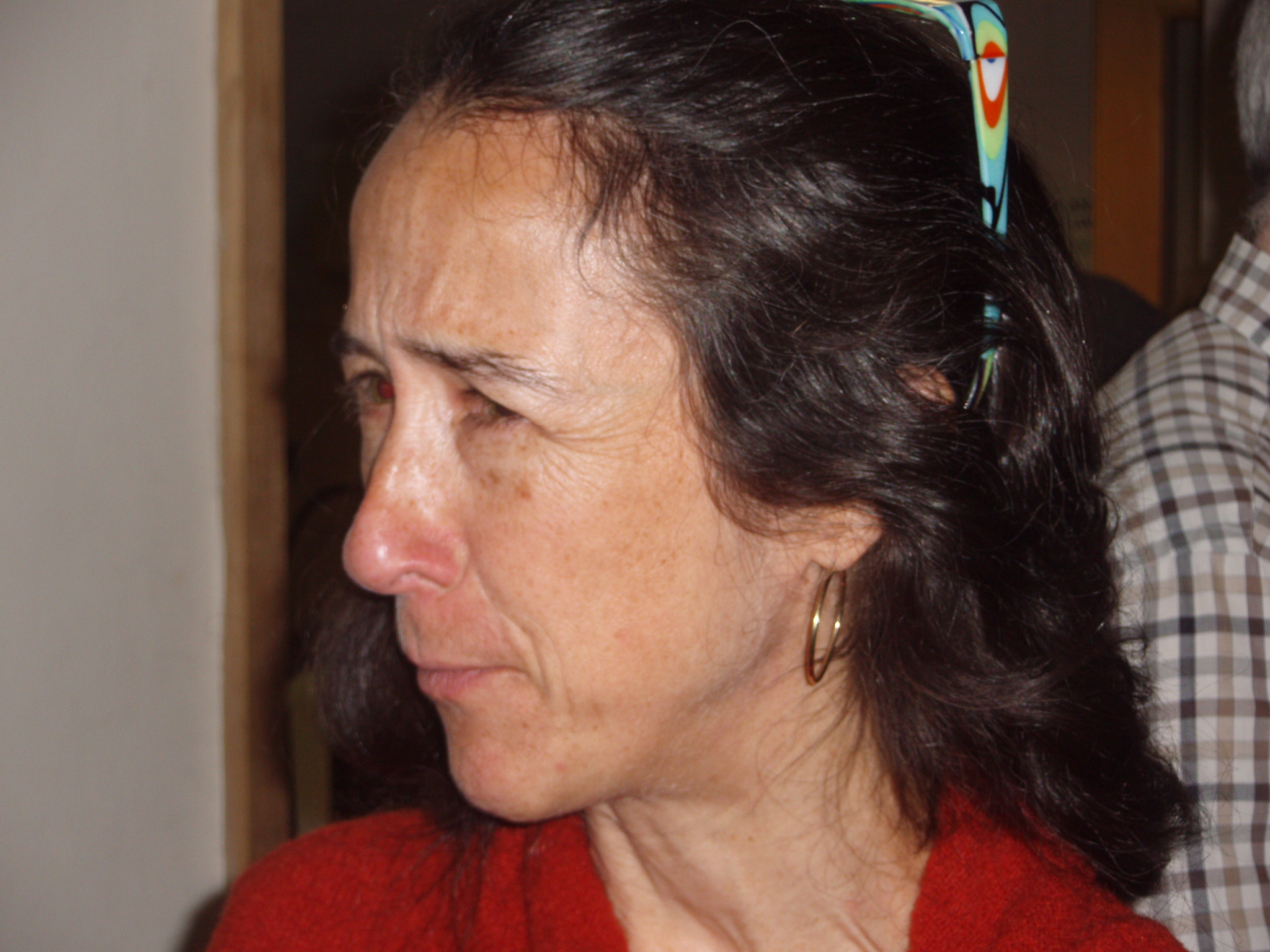

Leader of Camden Council
- In office 17 May 2000 – 7 November 2005
- Deputy: Theo Blackwell (2003–2004, 2005); Sue Vincent (2004–2005)
- Preceded by: Richard Arthur
- Succeeded by: Raj Chada

Labour Group Leader on Camden Council
- In office May 2000 – 4 October 2005
- Deputy: Theo Blackwell (2003–2004, 2005); Sue Vincent (2004–2005)
- Preceded by: Richard Arthur
- Succeeded by: Raj Chada

Camden Borough Councillor for Haverstock
- In office 3 May 1990 – 4 May 2006
- Succeeded by: Syed Hoque

Personal details
- Born: Jane Elisabeth Roberts; August 1955 (age 71)
- Party: Labour

Dame Jane Elisabeth Roberts, DBE (born August 1955) is a British psychiatrist and Labour Party politician.

She has been a consultant in child and adolescent psychiatry since 1994, and was medical director of Islington Primary Care Trust. She was leader of the London Borough of Camden from 2000 to 2005. In 2007, she served as chair of the Councillors Commission.

== Honours ==
She was made a Dame Commander of the Order of the British Empire in 2004 for services to local government.
