= Raj Chada =

British politician

Leader of Camden Council
- In office 8 November 2005 – 7 May 2006
- Preceded by: Jane Roberts
- Succeeded by: Keith Moffitt

Labour Group Leader on Camden Council
- In office 4 October 2005 – May 2006
- Preceded by: Jane Roberts
- Succeeded by: Anna Stewart

Camden councillor for Gospel Oak
- In office 2 May 2002 – 4 May 2006
- Succeeded by: Chris Philp

Personal details
- Party: Labour
- Spouse: Geethika Jayatilaka
- Children: Two
- Website: www.rajchada.com

Rajesh Chada, is a lawyer and Labour politician in England. He was the Leader of Camden London Borough Council from 2005 to 2006 and a councillor for Gospel Oak between 2002 and 2006.

He is a top criminal solicitor specialising in defending protesters and he is regularly quoted in the national press. He has been covered in major newspapers for defending 300 Extinction Rebellion activists, the Stansted Fifteen, nine Black Lives Matter protesters at Heathrow, protesters at DSEI, UK Uncut's sit-in in Fortnum and Masons, and Johnny Marbles. He has also acted successfully for Greta Thunberg and other activists, protesting against the fossil fuel industry.

He is described by Chambers and Partners as having "a strong reputation for his work representing political protesters and other individuals charged with public order offences" and was named the Legal Aid Practitioners Criminal Lawyer of the Year in 2012.

Chada is a Labour Party politician. He was elected to Camden Council in 2002, representing Gospel Oak ward. He quickly joined the Cabinet with responsibility for Housing, before becoming the Leader of the council in 2005, replacing Jane Roberts after she stepped down due to fear that she would lose the coming election. He was considered less 'Blairite' than Roberts, but lost his seat in 2006 to the Conservatives because of association with Blair post-Iraq War and delays in housing improvements. Chada stood for selection in a number of parliamentary seats without success, including Darlington and Reading West in 2010 and his home seat of Holborn and St Pancras in 2015.
