= 1986 Camden London Borough Council election =

1986 local election in England

1986 Camden Council election
| ← 1982 | 8 May 1986 | 1990 → |

All 59 seats to Camden Borough Council 30 seats needed for a majority

| | First party | Second party | Third party |
|---|---|---|---|
| Leader | Phil Turner | Stephen Moon |
| Party | Labour | Conservative | Alliance |
| Leader since | 1982 | 1985 |
| Leader's seat | Represented St Pancras; Stood in Priory | Adelaide |
| Last election | 33 seats, 40.7% | 26 seats, 33.3% | 0 seats, 24.9% |
| Seats won | 44 | 13 | 2 |
| Seat change | ▲11 | ▼13 | ▲2 |
| Popular vote | 30,337 | 16,357 | 12,040 |
| Percentage | 50.0% | 26.9% | 19.8% |
| Swing | ▲9.3% | ▼6.4% | ▼5.1% |
- Map of the results of the 1986 election to Camden London Borough Council. Labour in red, Conservatives in blue, Liberal Democrats in yellow.
Leader before election
Phil Turner
Labour
Leader
Tony Dykes
Labour

The 1986 Camden Council election took place on 8 May 1986 to elect members of Camden London Borough Council in London, England. The whole council was up for election.

Labour made big gains from the Conservatives across the borough: gaining Bloomsbury and one seat in Brunswick in the south, South End and the two remaining Highgate seats in the north-east, and Swiss Cottage in the north-west. The SDP–Liberal Alliance also won Fortune Green from the Conservatives.

Phil Turner announced before the election that he was stepping down as Leader of the Council to focus on fighting Hampstead and Highgate at the general election. Turner also moved wards from St Pancras to Kilburn Priory which was one of the safest Labour parts of the Hampstead and Highgate Parliamentary Constituency.

== Election result ==
Camden local election results 1986
| Party | Seats | Gains | Losses | Net gain/loss | Seats % | Votes % | Votes | +/− |
|---|---|---|---|---|---|---|---|---|
| Labour | 44 | 11 | 0 | +11 | 74.6 | 50.0 | 30,337 | +9.3 |
| Conservative | 13 | 0 | 13 | −13 | 22.0 | 26.9 | 16,357 | -6.4 |
| Alliance | 2 | 2 | 0 | +2 | 3.4 | 19.8 | 12,040 | -5.1 |
| Green | 0 | 0 | 0 | 0 | 0.0 | 1.4 | 857 | +1.1 |
| Independent | 0 | 0 | 0 | 0 | 0.0 | 0.3 | 178 | -0.1 |
| Others | 0 | 0 | 0 | 0 | 0.0 | 1.6 | 958 | +1.2 |

== Ward results ==
=== Adelaide ===
Adelaide (3)
| Party | Candidate | Votes | % | ±% |
|---|---|---|---|---|
| Conservative | Julian Tobin | 1,217 | | |
| Conservative | Stephen Moon | 1,158 | | |
| Conservative | Ian Pasley-Tyler | 1,155 | | |
| Labour | Brian Bell | 939 | | |
| Labour | Bryan Blatch | 929 | | |
| Labour | Anna Wernher | 797 | | |
| Alliance | Vera Miles | 487 | | |
| Alliance | Aubrey Sandman | 421 | | |
| Alliance | Erich Wagner | 400 | | |
| Turnout | | | | |
| Conservative hold | | Swing | | |
| Conservative hold | | Swing | | |
| Conservative hold | | Swing | | |

=== Belsize ===
Belsize (3)
| Party | Candidate | Votes | % | ±% |
|---|---|---|---|---|
| Conservative | Colin Glover | 1,055 | | |
| Conservative | Huntly Spence | 1,039 | | |
| Conservative | Judith Barnes | 1,005 | | |
| Labour | Margaret McPhee | 888 | | |
| Labour | Malcolm Bull | 875 | | |
| Labour | Ramendra Bhattacharyya | 841 | | |
| Alliance | David Davies | 818 | | |
| Alliance | Pauline Marriott | 788 | | |
| Alliance | Dudley Miles | 756 | | |
| Green | Philippa Draper | 236 | | |
| Turnout | | | | |
| Conservative hold | | Swing | | |
| Conservative hold | | Swing | | |
| Conservative hold | | Swing | | |

=== Bloomsbury ===
Bloomsbury (3)
| Party | Candidate | Votes | % | ±% |
|---|---|---|---|---|
| Labour | Michael Kirk | 1,307 | | |
| Labour | Nicola Kutapan | 1,302 | | |
| Labour | William Budd | 1,263 | | |
| Conservative | William Trite | 1,158 | | |
| Conservative | Martine Moon | 1,069 | | |
| Conservative | Mark Whitfield | 1,033 | | |
| Alliance | James Morris | 447 | | |
| Alliance | Geoffrey Sell | 413 | | |
| Alliance | Felicity Watkin | 387 | | |
| Turnout | | | | |
| Labour gain from Conservative | | Swing | | |
| Labour gain from Conservative | | Swing | | |
| Labour gain from Conservative | | Swing | | |

=== Brunswick ===
Brunswick (2)
| Party | Candidate | Votes | % | ±% |
|---|---|---|---|---|
| Conservative | Peter Skolar | 757 | | |
| Labour | Karen Newbury | 675 | | |
| Conservative | Kenneth Avery | 672 | | |
| Labour | John White | 652 | | |
| Alliance | Douglas Medhurst | 383 | | |
| Alliance | Kevin Cahill | 367 | | |
| Turnout | | | | |
| Conservative hold | | Swing | | |
| Labour gain from Conservative | | Swing | | |

=== Camden ===
Camden (2)
| Party | Candidate | Votes | % | ±% |
|---|---|---|---|---|
| Labour | Sheila Field | 1,258 | | |
| Labour | Satnam Gill | 1,173 | | |
| Alliance | Jonathon Owen | 765 | | |
| Alliance | David Simmons | 753 | | |
| Conservative | Doris Davis | 269 | | |
| Conservative | Toby Corder | 253 | | |
| Turnout | | | | |
| Labour hold | | Swing | | |
| Labour hold | | Swing | | |

=== Castlehaven ===
Castlehaven (2)
| Party | Candidate | Votes | % | ±% |
|---|---|---|---|---|
| Labour | Graham Good | 1,485 | | |
| Labour | Jasper Williams | 1,238 | | |
| Alliance | Jennifer Horne | 274 | | |
| Alliance | Keith Roberts | 262 | | |
| Conservative | Shirley Soskin | 221 | | |
| Conservative | Carl Teper | 187 | | |
| Turnout | | | | |
| Labour hold | | Swing | | |
| Labour hold | | Swing | | |

=== Caversham ===
Caversham (2)
| Party | Candidate | Votes | % | ±% |
|---|---|---|---|---|
| Labour | Gareth Smyth | 1,458 | | |
| Labour | Mary Cane | 1,441 | | |
| Conservative | Mark Hapgood | 348 | | |
| Conservative | Mark Stuart-Smith | 315 | | |
| Alliance | Jennifer Kavanagh | 313 | | |
| Alliance | Richard Thompson | 265 | | |
| Humanist | Stephen McConnell | 84 | | |
| Turnout | | | | |
| Labour hold | | Swing | | |
| Labour hold | | Swing | | |

=== Chalk Farm ===
Chalk Farm (2)
| Party | Candidate | Votes | % | ±% |
|---|---|---|---|---|
| Labour | Julie Fitzgerald | 1,124 | | |
| Labour | Janet Pope | 1,048 | | |
| Conservative | Anthony Kemp | 584 | | |
| Conservative | Anthony Blackburn | 582 | | |
| Alliance | David Casey | 431 | | |
| Alliance | Stephen White | 391 | | |
| Green | Elizabeth Noyes | 129 | | |
| Turnout | | | | |
| Labour hold | | Swing | | |
| Labour hold | | Swing | | |

=== Fitzjohns ===
Fitzjohns (2)
| Party | Candidate | Votes | % | ±% |
|---|---|---|---|---|
| Conservative | Ronald King | 735 | | |
| Conservative | Cathleen Mainds | 697 | | |
| Labour | Ian Swain | 451 | | |
| Labour | Sambhu Banik | 445 | | |
| Alliance | David Radford | 332 | | |
| Alliance | John Howson | 324 | | |
| Turnout | | | | |
| Conservative hold | | Swing | | |
| Conservative hold | | Swing | | |

=== Fortune Green ===
Fortune Green (2)
| Party | Candidate | Votes | % | ±% |
|---|---|---|---|---|
| Alliance | Flick Rea | 677 | | |
| Alliance | Roger Billins | 627 | | |
| Conservative | Paul Crossman | 578 | | |
| Labour | Catherine Joseph | 577 | | |
| Conservative | Ian Tomisson | 567 | | |
| Labour | Eric Kaill | 551 | | |
| Turnout | | | | |
| Alliance gain from Conservative | | Swing | | |
| Alliance gain from Conservative | | Swing | | |

=== Frognal ===
Frognal (2)
| Party | Candidate | Votes | % | ±% |
|---|---|---|---|---|
| Conservative | Alan Greengross | 930 | | |
| Conservative | Gwyneth Williams | 905 | | |
| Labour | Amber Dobson | 479 | | |
| Labour | David Richter | 446 | | |
| Alliance | Nicola-Jane Taylor | 401 | | |
| Alliance | Hilary Billins | 383 | | |
| Turnout | | | | |
| Conservative hold | | Swing | | |
| Conservative hold | | Swing | | |

=== Gospel Oak ===
Gospel Oak (2)
| Party | Candidate | Votes | % | ±% |
|---|---|---|---|---|
| Labour | Rose Head | 1,455 | | |
| Labour | Graham Shurety | 1,429 | | |
| Conservative | John Livingston | 410 | | |
| Conservative | Peter Somerville | 372 | | |
| Alliance | David Birkett | 283 | | |
| Alliance | Patricia Gros | 279 | | |
| Turnout | | | | |
| Labour hold | | Swing | | |
| Labour hold | | Swing | | |

=== Grafton ===
Grafton (2)
| Party | Candidate | Votes | % | ±% |
|---|---|---|---|---|
| Labour | Roy Shaw | 1,313 | | |
| Labour | Patrick Denny | 1,190 | | |
| Conservative | Catherine Dilnott-Cooper | 245 | | |
| Alliance | Jane Atkinson | 228 | | |
| Conservative | Peter Golds | 223 | | |
| Alliance | Mary Gillie | 212 | | |
| Turnout | | | | |
| Labour hold | | Swing | | |
| Labour hold | | Swing | | |

=== Hampstead Town ===
Hampstead Town (2)
| Party | Candidate | Votes | % | ±% |
|---|---|---|---|---|
| Conservative | Jacqueline Jones | 788 | | |
| Conservative | Selina Gee | 787 | | |
| Alliance | David Brierley | 695 | | |
| Alliance | David Aarons | 672 | | |
| Labour | David Bookless | 564 | | |
| Labour | Heather Kenmure | 517 | | |
| Turnout | | | | |
| Conservative hold | | Swing | | |
| Conservative hold | | Swing | | |

=== Highgate ===
Highgate (3)
| Party | Candidate | Votes | % | ±% |
|---|---|---|---|---|
| Labour | Barbara Beck | 1,966 | | |
| Labour | Margaret Cosin | 1,844 | | |
| Labour | John Wakeham | 1,739 | | |
| Conservative | Martin Morton | 1,185 | | |
| Conservative | Lesley Fields | 1,129 | | |
| Conservative | Peter Horne | 1,109 | | |
| Alliance | James McKinley | 901 | | |
| Alliance | Christina Schopflin | 896 | | |
| Alliance | Margaret Jackson-Roberts | 890 | | |
| Turnout | | | | |
| Labour hold | | Swing | | |
| Labour hold | | Swing | | |
| Labour gain from Conservative | | Swing | | |

=== Holborn ===
Holborn (2)
| Party | Candidate | Votes | % | ±% |
|---|---|---|---|---|
| Labour | Benjamin Griffith | 1,013 | | |
| Labour | Kenneth Hulme | 951 | | |
| Tenants' Representative | Ralph Barrett | 548 | | |
| Conservative | Peter Smaill | 533 | | |
| Conservative | Piers Wauchope | 458 | | |
| Alliance | Trevor Davis | 271 | | |
| Alliance | Robert Forrest | 210 | | |
| Turnout | | | | |
| Labour hold | | Swing | | |
| Labour hold | | Swing | | |

=== Kilburn ===
Kilburn (3)
| Party | Candidate | Votes | % | ±% |
|---|---|---|---|---|
| Labour | Angela Birtill | 1,925 | | |
| Labour | Katherine Allen | 1,866 | | |
| Labour | Alan Wood | 1,788 | | |
| Conservative | William Smith | 578 | | |
| Conservative | Alexandra Lawrie | 565 | | |
| Conservative | Jonathan Shapland | 558 | | |
| Alliance | Jeremy Allen | 518 | | |
| Alliance | James Allman | 515 | | |
| Alliance | Heather Thompson | 432 | | |
| Turnout | | | | |
| Labour hold | | Swing | | |
| Labour hold | | Swing | | |
| Labour hold | | Swing | | |

=== King's Cross ===
King's Cross (2)
| Party | Candidate | Votes | % | ±% |
|---|---|---|---|---|
| Labour | Barbara Hughes | 1,113 | | |
| Labour | Tony Dykes | 1,094 | | |
| Conservative | George Glossop | 402 | | |
| Conservative | James Turner | 382 | | |
| Alliance | Thomas Hibbert | 282 | | |
| Turnout | | | | |
| Labour hold | | Swing | | |
| Labour hold | | Swing | | |

=== Priory ===
Priory (2)
| Party | Candidate | Votes | % | ±% |
|---|---|---|---|---|
| Labour | Jacqueline Peacock | 1,621 | | |
| Labour | Phil Turner | 1,600 | | |
| Conservative | Andrew Lavy | 648 | | |
| Conservative | Marilyn Halberstam | 600 | | |
| Turnout | | | | |
| Labour hold | | Swing | | |
| Labour hold | | Swing | | |

=== Regent's Park ===
Regent's Park (3)
| Party | Candidate | Votes | % | ±% |
|---|---|---|---|---|
| Labour | Robert Latham | 1,554 | | |
| Labour | David Horan | 1,489 | | |
| Labour | Gillian Green | 1,442 | | |
| Alliance | William Jones | 1,293 | | |
| Alliance | Lee Barr | 1,257 | | |
| Alliance | Kenneth Rolph | 1,197 | | |
| Conservative | Stephen Robin | 658 | | |
| Conservative | Noel Moncaster | 635 | | |
| Conservative | Peter Slade | 617 | | |
| Tenants' Representative | Terence Hargrave | 326 | | |
| Turnout | | | | |
| Labour hold | | Swing | | |
| Labour hold | | Swing | | |
| Labour hold | | Swing | | |

=== St John's ===
St John's (2)
| Party | Candidate | Votes | % | ±% |
|---|---|---|---|---|
| Labour | Hilary Lowe | 1,469 | | |
| Labour | Richard Sumray | 1,462 | | |
| Alliance | Heather Hullah | 311 | | |
| Alliance | Soren Agerholm | 295 | | |
| Conservative | George Emsden | 271 | | |
| Conservative | Sinclair Webster | 254 | | |
| Turnout | | | | |
| Labour hold | | Swing | | |
| Labour hold | | Swing | | |

=== St Pancras ===
St Pancras (2)
| Party | Candidate | Votes | % | ±% |
|---|---|---|---|---|
| Labour | Stephen Bevington | 1,078 | | |
| Labour | Sandra Plummer | 917 | | |
| Conservative | Esther Bateman | 241 | | |
| Conservative | June Moncaster | 241 | | |
| Alliance | John Davidson | 212 | | |
| Alliance | Catherine Meehan | 197 | | |
| Turnout | | | | |
| Labour hold | | Swing | | |
| Labour hold | | Swing | | |

=== Somers Town ===
Somers Town (2)
| Party | Candidate | Votes | % | ±% |
|---|---|---|---|---|
| Labour | Thomas Devine | 1,195 | | |
| Labour | Alfred Saunders | 1,130 | | |
| Alliance | Betty Wilson | 288 | | |
| Alliance | Elizabeth Blundell | 278 | | |
| Conservative | David Harris | 214 | | |
| Conservative | Esther Mundlak | 212 | | |
| Independent | Keith Armstrong | 178 | | |
| Turnout | | | | |
| Labour hold | | Swing | | |
| Labour hold | | Swing | | |

=== South End ===
South End (2)
| Party | Candidate | Votes | % | ±% |
|---|---|---|---|---|
| Labour | Paul Orrett | 1,115 | | |
| Labour | Nirmal Roy | 1,064 | | |
| Conservative | Inge Reed | 635 | | |
| Conservative | Michael Farrer | 633 | | |
| Alliance | Jennifer Hall | 347 | | |
| Alliance | Sandra Lawman | 342 | | |
| Turnout | | | | |
| Labour gain from Conservative | | Swing | | |
| Labour gain from Conservative | | Swing | | |

=== Swiss Cottage ===
Swiss Cottage (3)
| Party | Candidate | Votes | % | ±% |
|---|---|---|---|---|
| Labour | Gloria Lazenby | 1,326 | | |
| Labour | Alan Rippington | 1,307 | | |
| Labour | Adrian Van States | 1,155 | | |
| Conservative | Robert Graham | 1,140 | | |
| Conservative | David Stone | 1,136 | | |
| Conservative | Roberta Robson | 1,103 | | |
| Alliance | Ian Bond | 637 | | |
| Alliance | Roderick Atkin | 613 | | |
| Alliance | Clive Pembridge | 569 | | |
| Green | Janet Crawford | 280 | | |
| Turnout | | | | |
| Labour gain from Conservative | | Swing | | |
| Labour gain from Conservative | | Swing | | |
| Labour gain from Conservative | | Swing | | |

=== West End ===
West End (2)
| Party | Candidate | Votes | % | ±% |
|---|---|---|---|---|
| Labour | Kevin McDonnell | 1,089 | | |
| Labour | Julia Devot | 1,087 | | |
| Conservative | Michael Flynn | 557 | | |
| Conservative | Harry Whitcut | 513 | | |
| Alliance | Peter Hatton | 446 | | |
| Alliance | Brian Sugden | 430 | | |
| Turnout | | | | |
| Labour hold | | Swing | | |
| Labour hold | | Swing | | |
