= 1982 Camden London Borough Council election =

1982 Camden Council election
← 1978	6 May 1982	1986 →

All 59 seats to Camden Borough Council 30 seats needed for a majority

	First party	Second party
Leader	Roy Shaw	Tony Kerpel
Party	Labour	Conservative
Leader since	1975	1981
Leader's seat	Grafton	Belsize
Last election	33 seats, 47.8%	26 seats, 45.2%
Seats won	33	26
Seat change	Steady	Steady
Popular vote	24,768	20,241
Percentage	40.7%	33.3%
Swing	▼7.1%	▼11.9%
- Map of the results of the 1982 election to Camden London Borough Council. Labour in red, Conservatives in blue.
Leader before election
Roy Shaw
Labour
Leader
Phil Turner
Labour

The 1982 Camden Council election took place on 6 May 1982 to elect members of Camden London Borough Council in London, England. The whole council was up for election.

The election, like the election across the country, was marked by the emergence of the SDP–Liberal Alliance. However, despite winning 25% of the vote across Camden, no Alliance councillors were elected. Few seats changed hands overall, with the Conservatives gaining two seats from Labour in Bloomsbury in the south and losing one seat to Labour in West Hampstead and one in Highgate. The Conservatives dominated the north of the seat, winning 19 of the 26 seats in Hampstead parliamentary constituency; Labour dominated the centre, winning 17 of 19 in St Pancras North, and the south, winning 9 of 14 in Holborn and St Pancras South. As of 2020, it was the last time that the Conservatives have seriously challenged for outright control of the council.

The day after the election, Labour leader Roy Shaw was replaced by leftwing caucus candidate Phil Turner, who became leader of the council.

== Election result ==
Camden local election results 1982
Party	Seats	Gains	Losses	Net gain/loss	Seats %	Votes %	Votes	+/−
Labour	33	2	2	0	54.2	40.7	24,768	-7.1
Conservative	26	2	2	0	45.8	33.3	20,241	-11.9
Alliance	0	0	0	0	0.0	24.9	15,171	+20.8
Ecology	0	0	0	0	0.0	0.3	193	n/a
Independent	0	0	0	0	0.0	0.4	71	n/a
Others	0	0	0	0	0.0	0.4	217	-2.5

== Ward results ==
=== Adelaide ===
Adelaide (3)
Party	Candidate	Votes	%	±%
Conservative	Julian Tobin	1,503		
Conservative	Michael Brahams	1,500		
Conservative	Ian Pasley-Taylor	1,495		
Labour	David Lewis	824		
Labour	Hilary Lowe	822		
Labour	Jennifer Pitkin	803		
Alliance	Diane Bailey	583		
Alliance	Alan Evans	552		
Alliance	Nicholas Collins	551		
Turnout				
Conservative hold		Swing		
Conservative hold		Swing		
Conservative hold		Swing		

=== Belsize ===
Belsize (3)
Party	Candidate	Votes	%	±%
Conservative	Tony Kerpel	1,411		
Conservative	Huntly Spence	1,381		
Conservative	Gerald Swyer	1,335		
Alliance	Margaret Little	761		
Alliance	Robert Heyland	751		
Alliance	Clive Agran	730		
Labour	Alan Griffiths	703		
Labour	Anthea Muir	678		
Labour	Roy Mathias	670		
Ecology	Lesley Sargent	102		
Ecology	Steven Margolis	85		
Turnout				
Conservative hold		Swing		
Conservative hold		Swing		
Conservative hold		Swing		

=== Bloomsbury ===
Bloomsbury (3)
Party	Candidate	Votes	%	±%
Conservative	William Trite	1,086		
Conservative	Andrew Gordon-Saker	1,085		
Conservative	Brian Rathbone	1,062		
Labour	Martin McNeill	994		
Labour	Anne Robertson	969		
Labour	Michael Broughton	967		
Alliance	Peter Symonds	613		
Alliance	Geoffrey Sell	601		
Alliance	Dennis Strojwas	587		
Turnout				
Conservative gain from Labour		Swing		
Conservative gain from Labour		Swing		
Conservative hold		Swing		

=== Brunswick ===
Brunswick (2)
Party	Candidate	Votes	%	±%
Conservative	Peter Skolar	940		
Conservative	Kenneth Avery	935		
Labour	Anthony Craig	638		
Labour	Ian Swain	580		
Alliance	John Pinfold	457		
Alliance	Ruth Schmidt	402		
Turnout				
Conservative hold		Swing		
Conservative hold		Swing		

=== Camden ===
Camden (2)
Party	Candidate	Votes	%	±%
Labour	Marion Chester	879		
Labour	Gregory Thomson	853		
Alliance	Martin Parker	477		
Alliance	Keith Roberts	477		
Conservative	Alan Fleming	369		
Conservative	John Malamah-Thomas	292		
Turnout				
Labour hold		Swing		
Labour hold		Swing		

=== Castlehaven ===
Castlehaven (2)
Party	Candidate	Votes	%	±%
Labour	Graham Good	1,014		
Labour	Jennifer Willmot	960		
Alliance	David Aarons	385		
Alliance	Liam Cowdrey	374		
Conservative	Christopher Fenwick	261		
Conservative	William Mills	252		
Independent	Brian Lake	163		
Turnout				
Labour hold		Swing		
Labour hold		Swing		

=== Caversham ===
Caversham (2)
Party	Candidate	Votes	%	±%
Labour	Julie Fitzgerald	1,187		
Labour	John Wakeham	1,146		
Alliance	Nicholas Bosanquet	750		
Alliance	Benjamin Stoneham	649		
Conservative	Thomas Crawford	410		
Conservative	Timothy Miller	369		
Turnout				
Labour hold		Swing		
Labour hold		Swing		

=== Chalk Farm ===
Chalk Farm (2)
Party	Candidate	Votes	%	±%
Labour	Hugh Bayley	996		
Labour	Teresa Ryan	967		
Alliance	Lindsay Granshaw	714		
Alliance	Sieska Cowdrey	711		
Conservative	Peter White	647		
Conservative	Sinclair Webster	632		
Turnout				
Labour hold		Swing		
Labour hold		Swing		

=== Fitzjohns ===
Fitzjohns (2)
Party	Candidate	Votes	%	±%
Conservative	Ronald King	883		
Conservative	Cathleen Mainds	839		
Alliance	George Sandersley	522		
Alliance	Olive Paynton	499		
Labour	June Ward	322		
Labour	David Bookless	315		
Turnout				
Conservative hold		Swing		
Conservative hold		Swing		

=== Fortune Green ===
Fortune Green (2)
Party	Candidate	Votes	%	±%
Conservative	Ian Tomisson	778		
Conservative	David Neil-Smith	756		
Alliance	Flick Rea	649		
Alliance	Eamond Hitchcock	604		
Labour	Virginia Berridge	562		
Labour	Kathryn O'Neill	502		
Turnout				
Conservative hold		Swing		
Conservative hold		Swing		

=== Frognal ===
Frognal (2)
Party	Candidate	Votes	%	±%
Conservative	Alan Greengross	1,170		
Conservative	Gwyneth Williams	1,124		
Alliance	William Laing	603		
Alliance	Richard Waddington	594		
Labour	Stella Greenall	346		
Labour	Marie Kosloff	330		
Turnout				
Conservative hold		Swing		
Conservative hold		Swing		

=== Gospel Oak ===
Gospel Oak (2)
Party	Candidate	Votes	%	±%
Labour	Ronald Hefferman	1,167		
Labour	Tessa Jowell	1,075		
Alliance	Philip Fitzpatrick	543		
Alliance	Margaret Jackson-Roberts	538		
Conservative	Clifford Edwards	389		
Conservative	Paul Brandt	363		
Save London Action Group	Sasthi Chakravarti	76		
Independent	David James	62		
Turnout				
Labour hold		Swing		
Labour hold		Swing		

=== Grafton ===
Grafton (2)
Party	Candidate	Votes	%	±%
Labour	Roy Shaw	1,040		
Labour	William Birtles	1,011		
Alliance	John Butterworth	452		
Alliance	Harry Harding	440		
Conservative	David Frid	268		
Conservative	Roger James	262		
Turnout				
Labour hold		Swing		
Labour hold		Swing		

=== Hampstead Town ===
Hampstead Town (2)
Party	Candidate	Votes	%	±%
Conservative	Julian Harrison	992		
Conservative	Anthony Robinson	962		
Alliance	David Birkett	676		
Alliance	Brian Sugden	627		
Labour	Eric Mitchell	463		
Labour	James Murphy	445		
Turnout				
Conservative hold		Swing		
Conservative hold		Swing		

=== Highgate ===
Highgate (3)
Party	Candidate	Votes	%	±%
Conservative	Anthony Blackburn	1,504		
Conservative	Martin Morton	1,473		
Labour	Barbara Beck	1,463		
Labour	Beresford Wilkinson	1,418		
Labour	Donald Harkness	1,393		
Conservative	Lilian O'Callaghan	1,377		
Alliance	Catherine Walton	1,151		
Alliance	John Coss	1,143		
Alliance	Malcolm Winsbury	1,049		
Turnout				
Conservative hold		Swing		
Conservative hold		Swing		
Labour gain from Conservative		Swing		

=== Holborn ===
Holborn (2)
Party	Candidate	Votes	%	±%
Labour	Julian Fulbrook	1,070		
Labour	Michael Kirk	1,008		
Conservative	Barry Greenway	631		
Conservative	Gillian Kinder	596		
Alliance	James Morris	397		
Alliance	Roger Karn	391		
Independent Labour	John Mason	141		
Turnout				
Labour hold		Swing		
Labour hold		Swing		

=== Kilburn ===
Kilburn (3)
Party	Candidate	Votes	%	±%
Labour	Katherine Allen	1,517		
Labour	Angela Birtill	1,409		
Labour	Alan Wood	1,394		
Alliance	James Allman	829		
Alliance	Roger Billins	809		
Alliance	Nicola-Jane Taylor	722		
Conservative	Frederick Copeman	597		
Conservative	Alan Mackay	583		
Conservative	Stephen Massey	567		
Turnout				
Labour hold		Swing		
Labour hold		Swing		
Labour hold		Swing		

=== King's Cross ===
King's Cross (2)
Party	Candidate	Votes	%	±%
Labour	Barbara Hughes	812		
Labour	Tony Dykes	802		
Conservative	Anthony Kemp	532		
Conservative	Stephen Robins	526		
Alliance	Thomas Hibbert	411		
Alliance	Derek Lowe	356		
Turnout				
Labour hold		Swing		
Labour hold		Swing		

=== Priory ===
Priory (2)
Party	Candidate	Votes	%	±%
Labour	Anna Bowman	1,537		
Labour	Peter Fletcher	1,409		
Conservative	Michael Flynn	849		
Conservative	Meta Perrin	804		
Alliance	Jean Austin	504		
Alliance	Roderick Atkin	485		
Turnout				
Labour hold		Swing		
Labour hold		Swing		

=== Regent's Park ===
Regent's Park (3)
Party	Candidate	Votes	%	±%
Labour	John Mills	1,223		
Labour	Robert Latham	1,195		
Labour	Andrew Bethell	1,194		
Conservative	Judith Barnes	1,061		
Conservative	Betty Wilson	1,046		
Conservative	Noel Moncaster	1,034		
Alliance	Christopher Ely	651		
Alliance	Michael Storey	650		
Alliance	William Sutherland	617		
Turnout				
Labour hold		Swing		
Labour hold		Swing		
Labour hold		Swing		

=== St John's ===
St John's (2)
Party	Candidate	Votes	%	±%
Labour	Mary Cane	1,106		
Labour	Richard Sumray	1,016		
Alliance	John Haugh	502		
Alliance	Jane Schopflin	482		
Conservative	John Wylde	278		
Conservative	Richard Zemlo	226		
Turnout				
Labour hold		Swing		
Labour hold		Swing		

=== St Pancras ===
St Pancras (2)
Party	Candidate	Votes	%	±%
Labour	Sandra Plummer	893		
Labour	Phil Turner	854		
Alliance	Brian Duggan	361		
Alliance	Malcolm Gilroy-Stevenson	290		
Conservative	Anthony Earl-Williams	273		
Conservative	Martin Markus	244		
Turnout				
Labour hold		Swing		
Labour hold		Swing		

=== Somers Town ===
Somers Town (2)
Party	Candidate	Votes	%	±%
Labour	Thomas Devine	1,208		
Labour	Graham Shurety	1,003		
Alliance	Elizabeth Blundell	344		
Alliance	Helen Brooks	315		
Conservative	Anthony Cheverton	313		
Conservative	David Harris	294		
Turnout				
Labour hold		Swing		
Labour hold		Swing		

=== South End ===
South End (2)
Party	Candidate	Votes	%	±%
Conservative	Michael Farrer	927		
Conservative	Stephen Moon	899		
Labour	Margaret Cosin	842		
Labour	Nirmal Roy	802		
Alliance	Jane Atkinson	540		
Alliance	Guy Newton	506		
Turnout				
Conservative hold		Swing		
Conservative hold		Swing		

=== Swiss Cottage ===
Swiss Cottage (3)
Party	Candidate	Votes	%	±%
Conservative	Derek Spencer	1,352		
Conservative	David Stone	1,322		
Conservative	Harry Whitcut	1,291		
Labour	Jacqueline Peacock	1,102		
Labour	Ralph Cowly	1,086		
Labour	Harry McCall	1,058		
Alliance	Andrew Bridgwater	742		
Alliance	Paul Burrall	714		
Alliance	Richard Ford	711		
Ecology	Geoffrey Syer	91		
Ecology	John Comben	82		
Turnout				
Labour hold		Swing		
Labour hold		Swing		

=== West End ===
West End (2)
Party	Candidate	Votes	%	±%
Labour	Sandra Wynn	860		
Labour	Gillian Green	838		
Conservative	Robert Graham	817		
Conservative	John Selden	776		
Alliance	Ida Linfield	554		
Alliance	Peter Hatton	541		
Turnout				
Labour hold		Swing		
Labour gain from Conservative		Swing		
