= 1990 Camden London Borough Council election =

1990 local election in England

1990 Camden Council election
← 1986	3 May 1990	1994 →

All 59 seats to Camden Borough Council 30 seats needed for a majority
- Registered: 126,862
- Turnout: 58,582, 46.18%

	First party	Second party
Leader	Tony Dykes	Peter Skolar
Party	Labour	Conservative
Leader since	1986	1986
Leader's seat	Caversham	Brunswick (lost)
Seats won	42	15
Seat change	▼2	▲2
Popular vote	61,878	37,881
Percentage	48.80%	29.88%
Swing		▼0.5%
	Third party	Fourth party
Leader	Felicity P. Rea	Unknown
Party	Liberal Democrats	Green
Leader since	1988	Unknown
Leader's seat	Fortune Green	Unknown
Seats won	2	0
Seat change	Steady	Steady
Popular vote	12,498	9,462
Percentage	9.86%	7.46%
- Map of the results of the 1990 election to Camden London Borough Council. Labour in red, Conservatives in blue, Liberal Democrats in yellow.
Leader before election
Labour
Leader
Labour

The 1990 Camden Council election took place on 3 May 1990 to elect members of Camden London Borough Council in London, England. The whole council was up for election. Labour comfortably stayed in overall control of the council, despite the Conservatives gaining three seats at their expense in Swiss Cottage. The Green Party came third in vote share with 13% of the vote, but won no seats.

== Election result ==
Camden local election results 1990
Party	Seats	Gains	Losses	Net gain/loss	Seats %	Votes %	Votes	+/−
Labour	42	1	3	▼2	71.19	48.80	61,878	
Conservative	15	3	1	▲2	25.42	29.88	37,881	
Liberal Democrats	2	0	0	Steady	3.39	9.86	12,498	
Green	0	0	0	Steady	0.00	7.46	9,462	
Camden Charter	0	0	0	Steady	0.00	3.28	4,162	
Community Representative	0	0	0	Steady	0.00	0.61	769	
Tenants' Representative	0	0	0	Steady	0.00	0.06	77	
Communist	0	0	0	Steady	0.00	0.05	58	
Total	59						126,785	

== Ward results ==
(*) - Indicates an incumbent candidate

(†) - Indicates an incumbent candidate who is standing in a different ward

=== Adelaide ===
Adelaide (3)
Party	Candidate	Votes	%
Conservative	Julian Tobin*	1,153	43.23
Conservative	Robert Graham* (Note: Graham replaced Cllr Stephen Moon after his resignation in 1987)	1,151	
Conservative	Ian Pasley-Tyler*	1,088	
Labour	Brian Bell	987	35.02
Labour	David Bookless	885	
Labour	Rose Head	876	
Green	Janine Sachs	269	10.28
Liberal Democrats	Vera Miles	222	8.18
Liberal Democrats	Frances Tully	215	
Liberal Democrats	Frances Tattersfield	206	
Camden Charter	Vicki Weissman	86	3.29
Registered electors		5,686	
Turnout		2590	45.55
Rejected ballots		5	0.19
Conservative hold			
Conservative hold			
Conservative hold			

=== Belsize ===
Belsize (3)
Party	Candidate	Votes	%
Conservative	Judith Barnes*	1,159	40.47
Conservative	Cathleen Mainds^{†} (Note: Mainds was a sitting councillor representing the Fitzjohn's ward)	1,124	
Conservative	Huntly Spence*	1,109	
Labour	Judith Pattison	971	33.99
Labour	Michael Rice	952	
Labour	Deborah Sacks	928	
Green	Conchita Vasey	393	14.06
Liberal Democrats	Anne Box	329	11.48
Liberal Democrats	Pauline Marriott	324	
Liberal Democrats	Ardon Lyon	310	
Registered electors		5,734	
Turnout		2677	46.69
Rejected ballots		4	0.15
Conservative hold			
Conservative hold			
Conservative hold			

=== Bloomsbury ===
Bloomsbury (3)
Party	Candidate	Votes	%
Labour	Peter Brayshaw	1,356	42.18
Labour	John Toomey	1,210	
Labour	Sadashivrao Deshmukh	1,177	
Conservative	Mark Haley	751	24.84
Conservative	Andrew Lownie	736	
Conservative	Robert Ricketts	719	
Green	Joanna Dickens	574	19.40
Liberal Democrats	Mary Gillie	269	8.65
Liberal Democrats	Patricia Smith	243	
Camden Charter	Brian Lake	163	4.93
Camden Charter	Sital Maan	141	
Camden Charter	Robert Norman	133	
Registered electors		7,130	
Turnout		2668	37.42
Rejected ballots		3	0.11
Labour hold			
Labour hold			
Labour hold			

=== Brunswick ===
Brunswick (2)
Party	Candidate	Votes	%
Labour	Ernest James	851	40.80
Labour	Paul Stinchcombe	789	
Conservative	Peter Skolar*	690	34.13
Conservative	Kenneth Avery	681	
Green	Patricia Hooker	298	14.82
Liberal Democrats	Roy Seger	206	10.25
Registered electors		4,240	
Turnout		1857	43.80
Rejected ballots		4	0.22
Labour gain from Conservative			
Labour hold			

=== Camden ===
Camden (2)
Party	Candidate	Votes	%
Labour	Sheila Field*	1,046	40.94
Labour	Barbara Hughes^{†} (Note: Hughes was a sitting councillor representing the King's Cross ward)	951	
Liberal Democrats	Marc Leggett	634	25.74
Liberal Democrats	Gavin Collins	621	
Green	Toby Fiennes	379	15.53
Conservative	John Davidson	327	12.50
Conservative	Lester May	283	
Camden Charter	June Swan	144	5.29
Camden Charter	Hazel Saunders	114	
Registered electors		5,105	
Turnout		2478	48.54
Rejected ballots		5	0.20
Labour hold			
Labour hold			

=== Castlehaven ===
Castlehaven (2)
Party	Candidate	Votes	%
Labour	Jane Roberts	1,073	60.10
Labour	Jasper Williams	1,002	
Conservative	Doris Davis	235	12.91
Conservative	Shirley Soskin	211	
Green	Marc Lewis	207	11.99
Liberal Democrats	Keith Roberts	133	7.53
Camden Charter	Trevor Long	130	7.47
Camden Charter	Cyra Croft	127	
Liberal Democrats	Jennifer Horne-Roberts	126	
Registered electors		4,135	
Turnout		1858	44.93
Rejected ballots		8	0.43
Labour hold			
Labour hold			

=== Caversham ===
Caversham (2)
Party	Candidate	Votes	%
Labour	Tony Dykes^{†} (Note: Dykes was a sitting councillor representing the King's Cross ward)	1,167	49.61
Labour	Bernard Kissen	1,101	
Conservative	Sylvia Currie	427	18.42
Conservative	Anthony Kemp	414	
Green	Joseph Young	346	15.13
Camden Charter	Margaret Clarke	242	9.75
Camden Charter	George Jamieson	203	
Liberal Democrats	Soren Agerholm	162	7.09
Registered electors		5,077	
Turnout		2258	44.48
Rejected ballots		11	0.49
Labour hold			
Labour hold			

=== Chalk Farm ===
Chalk Farm (2)
Party	Candidate	Votes	%
Labour	Julie Fitzgerald*	988	47.46
Labour	Harriet Garland	954	
Conservative	Anthony Blackburn	558	26.34
Conservative	Michael Farrer	520	
Green	Francis Atkinson	353	17.25
Liberal Democrats	Joan Nimmo-Smith	195	8.94
Camden Charter	Brian Haines	170	
Registered electors		3,910	
Turnout		1913	48.93
Rejected ballots		3	0.16
Labour hold			
Labour hold			

=== Fitzjohn's ===
Fitzjohn's (2)
Party	Candidate	Votes	%
Conservative	Ronald King*	758	50.34
Conservative	Andrew Marshall	713	
Labour	Deborah Townsend	429	26.88
Labour	Gareth Smyth	356	
Green	Anthony Mills	189	12.93
Liberal Democrats	Olive Paynton	156	9.85
Liberal Democrats	Henry Usher	131	
Registered electors		3,312	
Turnout		1443	43.57
Rejected ballots		13	0.89
Conservative hold			
Conservative hold			

=== Fortune Green ===
Fortune Green (2)
Party	Candidate	Votes	%
Lib Dem Spotlight Team	Flick Rea*	899	38.19
Lib Dem Spotlight Team	Jane Schopflin	642	
Labour	Alan Rippington	597	29.12
Labour	Sambhu Banik	579	
Conservative	Antoine Clarke	484	23.08
Conservative	Julia Densem	447	
Green	Francis Butler	194	9.61
Registered electors		3,629	
Turnout		2044	56.32
Rejected ballots		5	0.24
Liberal Democrats hold			
Liberal Democrats hold			

=== Frognal ===
Frognal (2)
Party	Candidate	Votes	%
Conservative	Pamela Beveridge	1,109	58.63
Conservative	Giles Marshall	1,058	
Labour	Dianne Hayter	343	17.47
Labour	Regan Scott	302	
Liberal Democrats	Barbara How	226	11.79
Green	Sebastian Secker Walker	224	12.11
Liberal Democrats	Nigel Barnes	209	
Registered electors		4,242	
Turnout		1897	44.72
Rejected ballots		7	0.37
Conservative hold			
Conservative hold			

=== Gospel Oak ===
Gospel Oak (2)
Party	Candidate	Votes	%
Labour	Winifred Parsons	1,345	61.57
Labour	John Mills	1,269	
Conservative	Giselle Harrison	467	21.57
Conservative	Maura Lyons	448	
Green	Lynda Dagley	358	16.86
Registered electors		4,476	
Turnout		2153	48.10
Rejected ballots		5	0.23
Labour hold			
Labour hold			

=== Grafton ===
Grafton (2)
Party	Candidate	Votes	%
Labour	Roy Shaw*	1,198	50.64
Labour	Terence Comerford	1,023	
Green	Valerie Armstrong	386	17.59
Camden Charter	Kevin Flanagan	357	16.27
Conservative	Anthony Cheverton	294	12.85
Conservative	Philip Seely	270	
Communist	Andrew Murray	58	2.65
Registered electors		4,291	
Turnout		2002	46.66
Rejected ballots		4	0.20
Labour hold			
Labour hold			

=== Hampstead Town ===
Hampstead Town (2)
Party	Candidate	Votes	%
Conservative	Maureen Braun	643	34.16
Conservative	Rita Pomfret* (Note: Pomfret replaced Cllr. Selina D. Gee after she resigned in 1988)	620	
Liberal Democrats	David Brierley	619	31.57
Liberal Democrats	John Dickie	549	
Labour	John Saynor	432	22.43
Labour	Anna Wernher	397	
Green	John Penney	219	11.84
Registered electors		3,705	
Turnout		1835	49.53
Rejected ballots		3	0.16
Conservative hold			
Conservative hold			

=== Highgate ===
Highgate (3)
Party	Candidate	Votes	%
Labour	Margaret Cosin*	1,785	45.01
Labour	Richard Arthur	1,780	
Labour	John Wakeham*	1,598	
Conservative	Cynthia Silk	1,084	26.91
Conservative	John Steinberg	1,010	
Conservative	Michael Stilwell	992	
Green	Peter Forrest	502	12.58
Green	Jenny Jones	460	
Liberal Democrats	Stephen Molesworth	329	7.50
Liberal Democrats	Mark Withers	268	
Liberal Democrats	Gertrude Sington	265	
Camden Charter	Mary Hodgson-Bennett	239	5.99
Camden Charter	Olive Gatenby	226	
Camden Charter	Jennifer Page	223	
Tenants' Representative	Laurence Williams	77	2.01
Registered electors		7,444	
Turnout		3802	51.07
Rejected ballots		8	0.21
Labour hold			
Labour hold			
Labour hold			

=== Holborn ===
Holborn (2)
Party	Candidate	Votes	%
Labour	Julian Fulbrook	1,119	49.36
Labour	Brian Woodrow	953	
Conservative	Richard Bull	463	20.68
Conservative	Bernard Sharpe	404	
Community Representative	Patricia Gros	386	18.34
Community Representative	Bruno Imerini	383	
Green	Robert Hopkins	244	11.62
Registered electors		4,576	
Turnout		2181	47.66
Rejected ballots		8	0.37
Labour hold			
Labour hold			

=== Kilburn ===
Kilburn (3)
Party	Candidate	Votes	%
Labour	Graham Good^{†} (Note: Good was a sitting councillor representing the Castlehaven ward)	1,730	56.69
Labour	Charlie Hedges	1,602	
Labour	Ramendranath Bhattacharyya	1,509	
Green	Gwendoline Evans	489	17.18
Conservative	Marian Harrison	482	16.05
Conservative	Jonathan Shapland	455	
Conservative	David Soskin	433	
Liberal Democrats	Jeremy Allen	325	10.08
Liberal Democrats	Heather Thompson	297	
Liberal Democrats	Clive Agran	240	
Registered electors		7,032	
Turnout		2882	40.98
Rejected ballots		11	0.38
Labour hold			
Labour hold			
Labour hold			

=== King's Cross ===
King's Cross (2)
Party	Candidate	Votes	%
Labour	Gloria Lazenby (Note: Lazenby was a sitting councillor represting the Swiss Cottage ward)	1,079	51.00
Labour	John White	969	
Conservative	George Glossop	438	21.01
Conservative	John Wilson	405	
Green	John Simpson	263	13.10
Liberal Democrats	Casper Wrede	158	7.87
Camden Charter	Cathal McGirr	141	7.02
Registered electors		4,535	
Turnout		1866	41.15
Rejected ballots		9	0.48
Labour hold			
Labour hold			

=== Priory ===
Priory (2)
Party	Candidate	Votes	%
Labour	Jacqueline Peacock*	1,260	51.39
Labour	Phil Turner*	1,133	
Conservative	Rose Irwin	591	25.29
Conservative	Timothy Evans	587	
Green	Stephen Games	330	14.17
Liberal Democrats	Margaret Knight	254	9.15
Liberal Democrats	Joseph McEnery	172	
Registered electors		4,797	
Turnout		2367	49.34
Rejected ballots		7	0.30
Labour hold			
Labour hold			

=== Regent's Park ===
Regent's Park (3)
Party	Candidate	Votes	%
Labour	James Turner*	1,594	52.04
Labour	William Budd^{†} (Note: Budd was a sitting councillor representing the Bloomsbury ward)	1,566	
Labour	David Horan	1,545	
Conservative	Pamela Anwar	912	29.74
Conservative	Noel Moncaster	897	
Conservative	Paul Morland	879	
Green	Lauren Soertsz	317	10.52
Liberal Democrats	Dudley Miles	245	7.70
Liberal Democrats	Margaret Jackson-Roberts	237	
Liberal Democrats	Robert Vernon-Jackson	215	
Registered electors		6,489	
Turnout		3129	48.22
Rejected ballots		7	0.22
Labour hold			
Labour hold			
Labour hold			

=== St John's ===
St John's (2)
Party	Candidate	Votes	%
Labour	Simon McDonald	1,213	55.89
Labour	Caroline Mills	1,159	
Green	Leon Pein	377	17.77
Conservative	John Hall	298	12.30
Conservative	Roland Walker	224	
Camden Charter	Jan Kelleher	179	8.43
Liberal Democrats	Lindsay Northover	136	5.61
Liberal Democrats	Robert Nimmo-Smith	102	
Registered electors		4,350	
Turnout		2021	46.46
Rejected ballots		5	0.25
Labour hold			
Labour hold			

=== St Pancras ===
St Pancras (2)
Party	Candidate	Votes	%
Labour	Mary Helsdon* (Note: Helsdon replaced Cllr Stephen Bevington after his resignation in 1988)	865	53.38
Labour	Graham Shurety^{†} (Note: Shurety was a sitting councillor representing the Gospel Oak ward)	745	
Camden Charter	Terence Hargrave	255	15.25
Conservative	Mark Hapgood	238	14.66
Camden Charter	Margarett McDermott	205	
Conservative	Esther Mundlak	204	
Green	Margaret Nuttgens	147	9.75
Liberal Democrats	Stephen White	105	6.96
Registered electors		3,601	
Turnout		1523	42.29
Rejected ballots		8	0.53
Labour hold			
Labour hold			

=== Somers Town ===
Somers Town (2)
Party	Candidate	Votes	%
Labour	Alfred Saunders*	1,140	55.27
Labour	Robert Austin	1,103	
Camden Charter	John Daley	417	20.54
Conservative	David Harris	337	14.93
Conservative	Sharon Keizner	269	
Green	Paul Wolf-Light	188	9.26
Green	Josephine Navarro Slater	187	
Registered electors		4,976	
Turnout		2077	41.74
Rejected ballots		16	0.77
Labour hold			
Labour hold			

=== South End ===
South End (2)
Party	Candidate	Votes	%
Labour	Myra Polya	929	46.79
Labour	Nirmal Roy*	905	
Conservative	Mark Bennett	632	31.22
Conservative	Jeremy Duke-Cohan	591	
Green	Elizabeth de Pauley	277	13.47
Green	Heather Formaini	251	
Liberal Democrats	Anthony Steele	168	8.52
Liberal Democrats	Peter Buonacorsi-How	165	
Registered electors		4,152	
Turnout		2067	49.78
Rejected ballots		8	0.39
Labour hold			
Labour hold			

=== Swiss Cottage ===
Swiss Cottage (3)
Party	Candidate	Votes	%
Conservative	Vaughan Emsley	1,159	37.48
Conservative	Anne Morris	1,153	
Conservative	Peter Horne	1,120	
Labour	Barbara Beck^{†} (Note: Beck was a sitting councillor representing the Highgate ward)	1,108	34.89
Labour	Terence Flanagan	1,069	
Labour	Sandra Plummer^{†} (Note: Plummer was a sitting councillor representing the St Pancras ward)	1,018	
Green	Caroline Counihan	449	13.60
Green	Nicholas Catephores	381	
Liberal Democrats	Margaret Fuelling	273	8.26
Liberal Democrats	Diana Self	250	
Liberal Democrats	Gillian Wagner	234	
Camden Charter	Alan Rogers	176	5.77
Registered electors		6,197	
Turnout		3030	48.89
Rejected ballots		6	0.20
Conservative gain from Labour			
Conservative gain from Labour			
Conservative gain from Labour			

=== West End ===
West End (2)
Party	Candidate	Votes	%
Labour	Julia Devote*	937	48.09
Labour	Kevin McDonnell*	931	
Conservative	Neil Bourhill	495	25.18
Conservative	Richard Bevan	482	
Lib Dem Spotlight Team	Keith Moffitt	243	11.17
Green	Catherine Gregory	211	10.87
Lib Dem Spotlight Team	Erich Wagner	191	
Camden Charter	Graham Bacon	91	4.69
Registered electors		4,041	
Turnout		1964	48.60
Rejected ballots		5	0.25
Labour hold			
Labour hold			
