= Lloyd Hatton =

British Labour Party politician

Lloyd Hatton MP
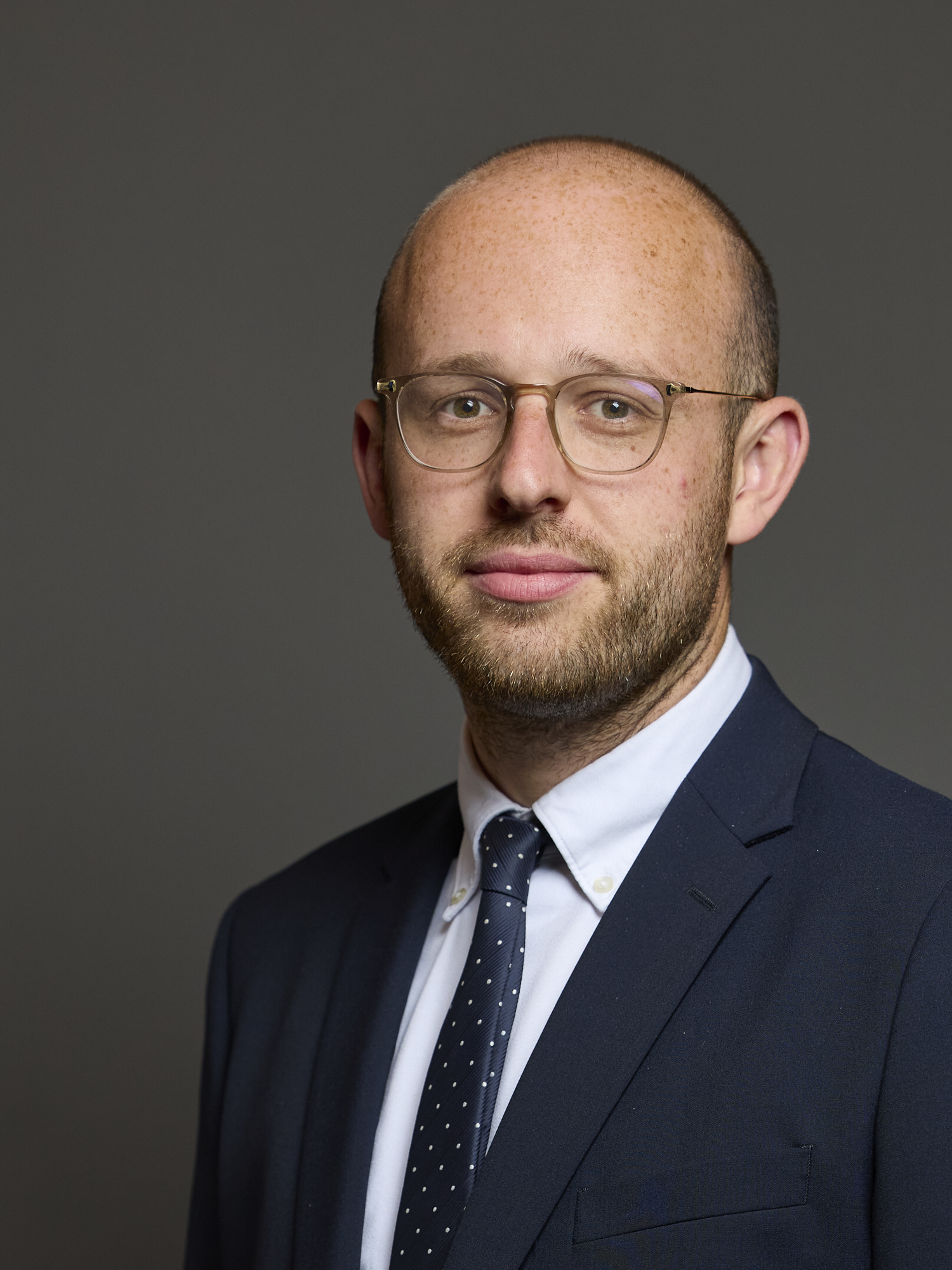
- Official portrait, 2024

Member of Parliament for South Dorset
- Incumbent
- Assumed office 4 July 2024
- Preceded by: Richard Drax
- Majority: 1,048 (2.1%)

Camden London Borough Council
- In office 5 May 2022 – July 2024
- Constituency: Kilburn

Personal details
- Party: Labour

Lloyd Hatton (born c. 1995) is a British Labour Party politician who has served as the Member of Parliament for South Dorset since 2024.

== Early life and career ==
Hatton was born and raised in Wyke Regis, Weymouth. He attended Holy Trinity primary school and All Saints Academy. He played rugby at Weymouth RFC and his first job was working weekends with his father in a fish and chip shop. Hatton attended Queen Mary University, London, reading history and politics. After graduating, Hatton became a political researcher and is a former member of the Youth Parliament. He has also been a school governor.

In the May 2022 local elections, Hatton won a seat on Camden London Borough Council representing Kilburn. During this time he lived in both Weymouth and London.

== Parliamentary career ==
In July 2024, Hatton was elected MP for South Dorset replacing incumbent Richard Drax who had previously held the seat for 14 years. Following his victory, Hatton resigned as a Camden councillor the week after becoming an MP.

Hatton served as a Parliamentary Private Secretary to the Department for Energy Security and Net Zero from May to July 2026.

== Personal life ==
He is openly LGBT+.
