= Swiss Cottage (ward) =

Former ward in the London Borough of Camden, England (1971-2022)

- Former electoral ward for the Camden London Borough Council
- Swiss Cottage ward boundaries from 2002 to 2022
- Borough: Camden
- County: Greater London
- Population: 12,900 (2011)
- Electorate: 9,192 (2018)

Former electoral ward
- Created: 1971
- Abolished: 2022
- Councillors: 1971–1978: 4; 1978–2022: 3
- Replaced by: Primrose Hill, South Hampstead
- ONS code: 00AGGW (2002–2022)
- GSS code: E05000144 (2002–2022)

Swiss Cottage was a ward in the London Borough of Camden, in the United Kingdom. The ward was first created for the 1971 election, redrawn in 1978 and 2002, and abolished for the 2022 elections. The population of this ward at the 2011 Census was 12,900.

Swiss Cottage ward was a long, thin ward centred on the intersection between Avenue Road and Finchley Road at Swiss Cottage. To the west of the intersection, it included South Hampstead. To the south-east, it included the northern part of St John's Wood and western part of Primrose Hill.

Under its previous form, Swiss Cottage covered just South Hampstead, while the former Adelaide ward covered the parts of the ward the east of Finchley Road (including Ye Olde Swiss Cottage itself). The ward was abolished for the 2022 election and its area was divided between the newly created Primrose Hill and South Hampstead wards.

== Councillors ==
Notable former councillors include Andrew Marshall (former Leader of the Conservative Group on Camden Council), Gloria Lazenby (former Labour Mayor of Camden), Tony Kerpel (political adviser who served as the personal assistant to Prime Minister Edward Heath), and former Labour cabinet minister Tessa Jowell. In 2002, Swiss Cottage elected Camden's first Jamaican councillor, Don Williams.

=== 1978–2022 ===
Three councillors represented Swiss Cottage ward between 1978 and 2022.

Election	Councillor	Councillor	Councillor
2022	Ward abolished: see South Hampstead and Primrose Hill		
2018	Nayra Bello O'Shanahan (Lab)	Leo Cassarani (Lab)	Simon Pearson (Lab)
2014	Andrew Marshall (Con)	Roger Freeman (Con)	Don Williams (Con)
2010	Andrew Marshall (Con)	Roger Freeman (Con)	Don Williams (Con)
2006	Andrew Marshall (Con)	Roger Freeman (Con)	Don Williams (Con)
2002	Andrew Marshall (Con)	Stephen Hocking (Con)	Don Williams (Con)
1999 by-election	Honora Morrissey (Con)	Robert Hall (Lab)	Stephen Hocking (Con)
1998	Mary Ryan (Lab)	Robert Hall (Lab)	Stephen Hocking (Con)
1994	Raymond Adamson (Lab)	John Macdonald (Lab)	Patrick Weir (Lab)
1992 by-election	Peter J. Skolar (Con)	Anne Morris (Con)	Peter Horne (Con)
1990	Vaughan Emsley (Con)	Anne Morris (Con)	Peter Horne (Con)
1986	Gloria Lazenby (Lab)	Alan Rippington (Lab)	Adrian Van States (Lab)
1983 by-election	Robert Graham (Con)	David Stone (Con)	Harry Whitcut (Con)
1982	Derek Spencer (Con)	David Stone (Con)	Harry Whitcut (Con)
1979 by-election	David Osborne (Con)	Michael Flynn (Con)	Ronald Rees (Con)
1978	David Osborne (Con)	Michael Flynn (Con)	Brian Stoner (Con)

=== 1971–1978 ===
Four councillors represented Swiss Cottage ward between 1971 and 1978.

Election	Councillor	Councillor	Councillor	Councillor
1977 by-election	Ron King (Con)	Michael C. Brahams (Con)	Anthony Kerpel (Con)	Brian Stoner (Con)
1974	Ron King (Con)	Ronald Raymond-Cox (Con)	Anthony Kerpel (Con)	Brian Stoner (Con)
1972 by-election	Tessa Jowell (Lab)	Neil McIntosh (Lab)	Arthur Soutter (Lab)	Ernest Wistrich (Lab)
1971	Tessa Jowell (Lab)	John Eidinow (Lab)	Arthur Soutter (Lab)	Ernest Wistrich (Lab)

== Election results ==
The last election was held on 3 May 2018. Candidates seeking re-election are marked with an asterisk (*).

=== 2002–2018 ===
==== 2018 election ====
Swiss Cottage ward election, 3 May 2018
Party	Candidate	Votes	%	±%
Labour	Nayra Bello O'Shanahan	1,605	45.5	+12.5
Labour	Leo Cassarani	1,541	43.7	+12.9
Labour	Simon Pearson	1,417	40.1	+7.7
Conservative	Kate Fairhurst	1,324	37.5	−5.5
Conservative	Calvin Robinson	1,277	36.2	−5.3
Conservative	Don Williams *	1,277	36.2	−3.0
Liberal Democrats	Scott Jeremy Benson	456	12.9	+1.8
Liberal Democrats	Kushal Bhimjiani	448	12.7	+3.1
Liberal Democrats	Nick Russell	388	11.0	+3.6
Green	Sheila Hayman	262	7.4	−6.5
Green	Brian Gascoigne	250	7.1	−4.7
Independent	Lina Hammouda	36	1.0	N/A
Independent	Peter Straker	33	0.9	N/A
Independent	Calvin Po	24	0.7	N/A
Turnout			38.47	
Labour gain from Conservative		Swing		
Labour gain from Conservative		Swing		
Labour gain from Conservative		Swing		

==== 2014 election ====
Swiss Cottage ward election, 22 May 2014
Party	Candidate	Votes	%	±%
Conservative	Andrew Marshall *	1,340	43.0	+4.1
Conservative	Roger Freeman *	1,294	41.5	+2.4
Conservative	Don Williams *	1,221	39.2	−0.3
Labour	Ben Nunn	1,029	33.0	+6.0
Labour	Simon Pearson	1,008	32.4	+10.7
Labour	Gretel Reynolds	960	30.8	+10.2
Green	Tom Franklin	433	13.9	+6.9
Green	Helen Jack	367	11.8	+5.2
Liberal Democrats	Jill Newbrook	347	11.1	−17.6
Green	Sheila Patton	339	10.9	+6.0
Liberal Democrats	Chris Butler	300	9.6	−16.0
Liberal Democrats	Andrew Haslam-Jones	230	7.4	−17.8
Turnout		8,886	34.7	
Conservative hold		Swing		
Conservative hold		Swing		
Conservative hold		Swing		

In 2018, Andrew Marshall resigned from the Conservative Party and defected to the Liberal Democrats.

==== 2010 election ====
Swiss Cottage ward election, 6 May 2010
Party	Candidate	Votes	%	±%
Conservative	Don Williams *	2,179	39.5	−5.1
Conservative	Roger Freeman *	2,161	39.1	−6.5
Conservative	Andrew Marshall *	2,145	38.9	−7.4
Liberal Democrats	Nick Horton	1,586	28.7	+9.2
Labour	Katharine Bligh	1,488	27.0	+3.4
Liberal Democrats	Tony Koutsoumbos	1,411	25.6	+11.1
Liberal Democrats	Flo Cubbin	1,389	25.2	+10.9
Labour	Lewis Baston	1,196	21.7	−1.2
Labour	Kathryn Purcell	1,139	20.6	+1.9
Green	Stephen Cottle	384	7.0	−8.6
Green	Morgan Watkins	367	6.6	−6.1
Green	Alan Wheatley	273	4.9	−4.2
UKIP	Magnus Nielsen	139	2.5	+0.2
Turnout		5,520	60.3	+28.3
Conservative hold		Swing		
Conservative hold		Swing		
Conservative hold		Swing		

==== 2006 election ====
Swiss Cottage ward election, 4 May 2006
Party	Candidate	Votes	%	±%
Conservative	Andrew Marshall *	1,292	46.3	−2.3
Conservative	Roger Freeman	1,272	45.6	−6.1
Conservative	Don Williams *	1,243	44.6	−3.3
Labour	Katharine Bligh	659	23.6	+1.6
Labour	Selman Ansari	638	22.9	+1.6
Liberal Democrats	Jillian Newbrook	543	19.5	+1.1
Labour	Charles Keal	522	18.7	−1.8
Green	Elizabeth Charvet	435	15.6	+7.9
Liberal Democrats	Harriet Sloane	405	14.5	−3.8
Liberal Democrats	Sally Twite	400	14.3	−2.9
Green	Lucy Wills	355	12.7	+1.0
Green	Alan Wheatley	255	9.1	+2.6
UKIP	Magnus Nielsen	63	2.3	+0.7
CPA	Alphonse Komesha	25	0.9	N/A
Turnout		8,107	32.0	
Conservative hold		Swing		
Conservative hold		Swing		
Conservative hold		Swing		

==== 2002 election ====
Swiss Cottage ward election, 2 May 2002
Party	Candidate	Votes	%	±%
Conservative	Stephen Hocking *	1,175	51.7	
Conservative	Andrew Marshall	1,106	48.6	
Conservative	Don Williams	1,090	47.9	
Labour	Geoffrey Berridge	500	22.0	
Labour	David Taggart	484	21.3	
Labour	Abdul Careem	467	20.5	
Liberal Democrats	Nicholas Collins	419	18.4	
Liberal Democrats	Rosalyn Harper	416	18.3	
Liberal Democrats	Honora Morrissey	391	17.2	
Green	Lucy Wills	265	11.7	
Green	Katherina Wolpe	174	7.7	
Green	Wolfgang Heiny	148	6.5	
Independent	Magnus Nielsen	36	1.6	
Turnout		6,671	28.6	

=== 1978–2002 ===
The last election on 7 May 1998 was held under the original ward boundaries.

==== 1999 by-election ====
Swiss Cottage by-election, 22 April 1999
Party	Candidate	Votes	%	±%
Conservative	Honora Morrissey	705	42.7	+17.2
Labour	Deborah H. Sacks	557	33.8	+3.9
Liberal Democrats	Rex C. Warrick	158	9.6	−5.2
Independent Labour	John Macdonald	126	7.6	−12.6
Green	Douglas S. Earl	59	3.6	−6.0
Independent	Mehdi A. Farshtchi	45	2.7	+2.7
Majority		148	8.9	
Turnout		1,650	24.0	
Conservative gain from Labour		Swing		

The by-election was called following the resignation of Mary Ryan.

==== 1998 election ====
Swiss Cottage ward election, 7 May 1998
Party	Candidate	Votes	%	±%
Labour	Mary Ryan	887		
Labour	Robert Hall	834		
Conservative	Stephen Hocking	756		
Conservative	Honora Morrissey	754		
Conservative	Peter Horne	732		
Labour	Bernard Moss	710		
Independent Labour	John Macdonald *	600		
Liberal Democrats	Nicholas Collins	439		
Liberal Democrats	Sally Twite	378		
Liberal Democrats	Herbert Newbrook	365		
Green	Catherine Gregory	284		
Turnout		6,739	35.4	
Labour hold		Swing		
Labour hold		Swing		
Conservative gain from Labour		Swing		

==== 1994 election ====
Swiss Cottage ward election, 5 May 1994
Party	Candidate	Votes	%	±%
Labour	Raymond Adamson	1,076		
Labour	John Macdonald	1,070		
Labour	Patrick Weir	1,015		
Conservative	Anne Morris *	926		
Conservative	Peter Horne *	869		
Conservative	Peter Skolar *	865		
Liberal Democrats	Elizabeth Burney-Jones	420		
Liberal Democrats	Nicholas Collins	418		
Liberal Democrats	Diana Self	374		
Green	Debra Green	232		
Turnout			42.0	
Labour gain from Conservative		Swing		
Labour gain from Conservative		Swing		
Labour gain from Conservative		Swing		

==== 1992 by-election ====
Swiss Cottage by-election, 7 May 1992
Party	Candidate	Votes	%	±%
Conservative	Peter J. Skolar	1,278	50.5	
Labour	Nicholas Prior	940	37.1	
Liberal Democrats	Diana M. Self	222	8.8	
Green	Stephen N. Games	91	3.6	
Turnout			42.3	
Conservative hold		Swing		

The by-election was called following the resignation of Vaughan A. Emsley.

==== 1990 election ====
Swiss Cottage ward election, 3 May 1990
Party	Candidate	Votes	%	±%
Conservative	Vaughan Emsley	1,159		
Conservative	Anne Morris	1,153		
Conservative	Peter Horne	1,120		
Labour	Barbara Beck	1,108		
Labour	Terence Flanagan	1,069		
Labour	Sandra Plummer	1,018		
Green	Caroline Counihan	449		
Green	Nicholas Catephores	381		
Liberal Democrats	Margaret Fuelling	273		
Liberal Democrats	Diana Self	250		
Liberal Democrats	Gillian Wagner	234		
Camden Charter	Alan Rogers	176		
Turnout			48.9	
Conservative gain from Labour		Swing		
Conservative gain from Labour		Swing		
Conservative gain from Labour		Swing		

==== 1986 election ====
Swiss Cottage ward election, 8 May 1986
Party	Candidate	Votes	%	±%
Labour	Gloria Lazenby	1,326		
Labour	Alan Rippington	1,307		
Labour	Adrian Van States	1,155		
Conservative	Robert Graham *	1,140		
Conservative	David Stone *	1,136		
Conservative	Roberta Robson	1,103		
Alliance	Ian Bond	637		
Alliance	Roderick Atkin	613		
Alliance	Clive Pembridge	569		
Green	Janet Crawford	280		
Turnout			51.9	
Labour gain from Conservative		Swing		
Labour gain from Conservative		Swing		
Labour gain from Conservative		Swing		

==== 1983 by-election ====
Swiss Cottage by-election, 21 July 1983
Party	Candidate	Votes	%	±%
Conservative	Robert Graham	1,168		
Labour	Jacqueline Peacock	994		
Alliance	Andrew Bridgwater	457		
Turnout			37.9	
Conservative hold		Swing		

The by-election was called following the resignation of Derek Spencer on his election as MP for Leicester South.

==== 1982 election ====
Swiss Cottage ward election, 6 May 1982
Party	Candidate	Votes	%	±%
Conservative	Derek Spencer	1,352		
Conservative	David Stone	1,322		
Conservative	Harry Whitcut	1,291		
Labour	Jacqueline Peacock	1,102		
Labour	Ralph Cowly	1,086		
Labour	Harry McCall	1,058		
Alliance	Andrew Bridgwater	742		
Alliance	Paul Burrall	714		
Alliance	Richard Ford	711		
Ecology	Geoffrey Syer	91		
Ecology	John Comben	82		
Turnout			46.1	
Conservative hold		Swing		
Conservative hold		Swing		
Conservative hold		Swing		

==== 1979 by-election ====
Swiss Cottage by-election, 3 May 1979
Party	Candidate	Votes	%	±%
Conservative	Ronald Rees	2,282		
Labour	Enyd Norman	1,885		
Liberal	Roger Billins	719		
Turnout				
Conservative hold		Swing		

The by-election was called following the resignation of Brian Stoner.

==== 1978 election ====
Swiss Cottage ward election, 4 May 1978
Party	Candidate	Votes	%	±%
Conservative	David Osborne	1,648		
Conservative	Michael Flynn	1,633		
Conservative	Brian Stoner *	1,602		
Labour	Christopher Heginbotham	1,343		
Labour	Enyd Norman	1,326		
Labour	Denis MacShane	1,274		
Liberal	Andrew Bridgwater	297		
Liberal	Jillian Newbrook	292		
Liberal	Janet Heller	291		
Turnout			45.1	
Conservative win (new seat)				
Conservative win (new seat)				
Conservative win (new seat)				

=== Pre 1978 ===
Before 1978, under different boundaries, the ward was represented by four councillors.

==== 1977 by-election ====
Swiss Cottage by-election, 20 October 1977
Party	Candidate	Votes	%	±%
Conservative	Michael C. Brahams	1,682		
Labour	Margaret Anna. V. Bowman	1,081		
Liberal	Andrew Bridgwater	189		
National Front	Gwendoline J. Evans	68		
Turnout			32.6	
Conservative hold		Swing		

The by-election was called following the resignation of Ronald Raymond-Cox.

==== 1974 election ====
Swiss Cottage ward election, 2 May 1974
Party	Candidate	Votes	%	±%
Conservative	Ron King	1,636	45.7	
Conservative	Ronald Raymond-Cox	1,625		
Conservative	Anthony Kerpel	1,616		
Conservative	Brian Stoner	1,559		
Labour	William Budd	1,535	42.8	
Labour	Walter Burgess	1,533		
Labour	Arthur Soutter *	1,508		
Labour	Gurmukh Singh	1,465		
Liberal	Kenneth Carter	412	11.5	
Liberal	Robert Pellegrinetti	369		
Turnout			38.3	
Conservative gain from Labour		Swing		
Conservative gain from Labour		Swing		
Conservative gain from Labour		Swing		
Conservative gain from Labour		Swing		

==== 1972 by-election ====
Swiss Cottage by-election, 2 March 1972
Party	Candidate	Votes	%	±%
Labour	Neil McIntosh	1,576		
Conservative	Ron King	1,481		
Liberal	Ray Benad	267		
Turnout			33.1	
Labour hold		Swing		

The by-election was called following the resignation of John Eidinow.

==== 1971 election ====
Swiss Cottage ward election, 13 May 1971
Party	Candidate	Votes	%	±%
Labour	Ms Tessa Jowell	2,026	48.9	
Labour	John Eidinow	2,018		
Labour	Arthur Soutter	1,974		
Labour	Ernest Wistrich	1,893		
Conservative	Ronald King	1,804	43.5	
Conservative	Ms Phillippa Raymond-Cox	1,792		
Conservative	Ms Christine Stewart-Munro	1,787		
Conservative	Sidney Torrance	1,780		
Liberal	Ms Kay Peacock	317	7.6	
Liberal	Ray Benad	298		
Turnout			38.8	
Labour win (new seat)				
Labour win (new seat)				
Labour win (new seat)				
Labour win (new seat)				
