= Flick Rea =

English politician (1938–2026)

Flick Rea MBE

Lib Dem Group Leader on Camden Council
- In office 22 May 2014 – 7 September 2020
- Preceded by: Keith Moffitt
- Succeeded by: Luisa Porritt
- In office May 1986 – 12 May 2005
- Preceded by: Position established
- Succeeded by: Keith Moffitt

Camden Borough Councillor for Fortune Green
- In office 8 May 1986 – 4 June 2021
- Preceded by: Ian Tomisson
- Succeeded by: Nancy Jirira

Personal details
- Born: Felicity Marion Peel Corbin; 21 May 1938 Taunton, Somerset, England
- Died: 25 May 2026 (aged 88) Paddington, London, England
- Party: Liberal Democrat
- Other political affiliations: Liberal
- Spouse: Charles Rea
- Education: Royal Academy of Dramatic Art

Felicity Marion Peel Rea (née Corbin; 21 May 1938 – 25 May 2026), known as Flick Rea, was an English Liberal Democrat politician who represented the Fortune Green ward on Camden Council for 35 years, before her retirement in 2021.

== Early life and education ==
Rea was born on 21 May 1938 in Taunton, Somerset. She was the only child of Lieutenant Colonel Eustace Peel Corbin and his wife Phyllis (née Brabner). Her father, a descendant of Sir Robert Peel, was headmaster at Huish's Grammar School. She was educated at Weirfield School in Taunton. It was her ambition to be an actress from the age of five, and she appeared in local amateur stage productions with the Pleiades Players and Taunton Thespians. After leaving school, she trained at Bristol's Hartley Hodder School of Drama, receiving training in dancing, fencing and elocution, and was by then known as Felicity Peel Corbin. During this period, she won the Hartley Hodder Cup for the best acting performance at the Taunton and Somerset Music and Drama Festival in 1954, and the London Academy of Music and Dramatic Art's silver medal.

She then completed a two-year course at the Royal Academy of Dramatic Art in London, leaving in July 1958. A fellow student was Glenda Jackson, who would later become her MP. Rea was one of the last debutantes to be presented at Court.

By the early 1960s, she was using Felicity Peel as her stage name. Rea worked with the Salisbury Repertory Company, and a repertory company in Oldham. Her early credits included The Marriage-Go-Round, The Boy Friend, Simple Spymen, Watch It, Sailor, Julius Caesar and Love in a Mist. She had a small role in a 1961 episode of ABC Television's The Avengers. She also appeared in the film A Kind of Loving.

== Political career ==
=== Camden Council ===
In 1974, Rea joined the Liberal Party. She first stood for election to Camden Council in a by-election in April 1980, following the resignation of Fortune Green ward's Conservative councillor Richard Almond. Representing the Liberals, she came third behind the Labour candidate, with the Conservatives holding the seat. She again stood for the two-member Fortune Green ward (based around the area of the same name) in 1982, this time as a Liberal and Social Democratic Party Alliance candidate. The Liberals had come third behind Labour in Fortune Green at the 1978 election (when the ward was created), with the Conservatives winning both seats. However, Rea and her fellow Alliance candidate Esmond Hitchcock finished second to the Conservatives in 1982, with Rea being the closer of the two to being elected in what was a three-way marginal.

At the next council election, in 1986, Rea and Roger Billins gained both Fortune Green seats for the Alliance, under the banner of the Liberal Social Democratic Party Alliance Spotlight Team. She remained a councillor continuously from that point on. In 1990, she was elected as a Liberal Democratic Spotlight Team candidate, the Liberals by that point having merged with the Social Democratic Party to form the Liberal Democrats.

Rea was elected as the leader of Camden Liberal Democrats from 1986 to 2005, and again from 2014 to 2020. In 2001, Rea became the first Liberal Democrat to chair a committee on Camden Council. She oversaw the scrutiny panel on the council's administration of its commercial properties and produced a report with the conclusion that "We're [Camden council] not actually very good landlords". In 2006, Rea was given the council's culture and leisure portfolio. Part of this included presiding over the restoration of the Prince of Wales Baths (now Kentish Town sports centre).

In 2013, the Liberal Democrat Group objected to the ruling Labour administration's choice of mayor, and unsuccessfully nominated Rea instead. She was the sole Liberal Democrat on the council in 2014, after all the others had lost their seats at that year's elections. Following this, she said: "I will continue to cause trouble. I've been a councillor for 28 years. I intend to put the knowledge to good use for the benefit of residents in Fortune Green."

At the Liberal Democrats' 2018 campaign launch, the former Scottish Secretary Alistair Carmichael endorsed Rea's successful bid for re-election, calling her "formidable". In November that year, a motion was put forward to the council by Rea and her colleague Luisa Porritt calling for a second referendum on Britain's departure from the European Union; with the support of Labour councillors, it was passed. Rea retired on 4 June 2021, and her seat was retained for the Liberal Democrats at a 22 July by-election by Nancy Jirira. On 21 June 2022, Rea was appointed an honorary alderman of the London Borough of Camden.

In 2013, Rea received an MBE for services to local government. The Hampstead & Highgate Express dubbed her "The Empress of West Hampstead" (the area being considered part of the Fortune Green ward she represented). Similarly, her son Robert described Rea as "the Queen of West Hampstead". She took part in readings of poetry at a 2016 recital in West Hampstead Library, and helped organise West Hampstead's annual Jester Festival.

=== Other roles ===
In 1997, Rea became a part-time administrator for the London Liberal Democrats. After deciding to vote for Susan Kramer as the party's first London mayoral candidate at the 2000 election, Rea worked as Kramer's secretary.

She acted as a member of the London Arts Council, sat on the board of the Hampstead Theatre and was Chair of the Local Government Association's Culture, Tourism and Sports Board. Locally, Rea was an active member of the community pressure group West Hampstead Amenity and Transport group (WHAT), which she co-founded, and the consumer organisation London Regional Passengers' Committee (LRPC). For a number of years, Rea was secretary of the Pedestrians' Association. She was appointed by Camden Council as a Trustee of the Charles Dickens Museum.

== Personal life and death ==
On 15 July 1962, she married fellow actor Charles Patrick Rea in Staplegrove, Taunton. They had met while she was working backstage on the Frank Vosper thriller Love From a Stranger. The couple moved to West Hampstead, north west London, and had a son and a daughter. Charles, who had numerous television and film credits, died on 17 March 1992, aged 69.

Rea died at St Mary's Hospital in Paddington, London, on 25 May 2026, at the age of 88.
