= Kate Allen (Amnesty International) =

British charity director

Katherine Allen
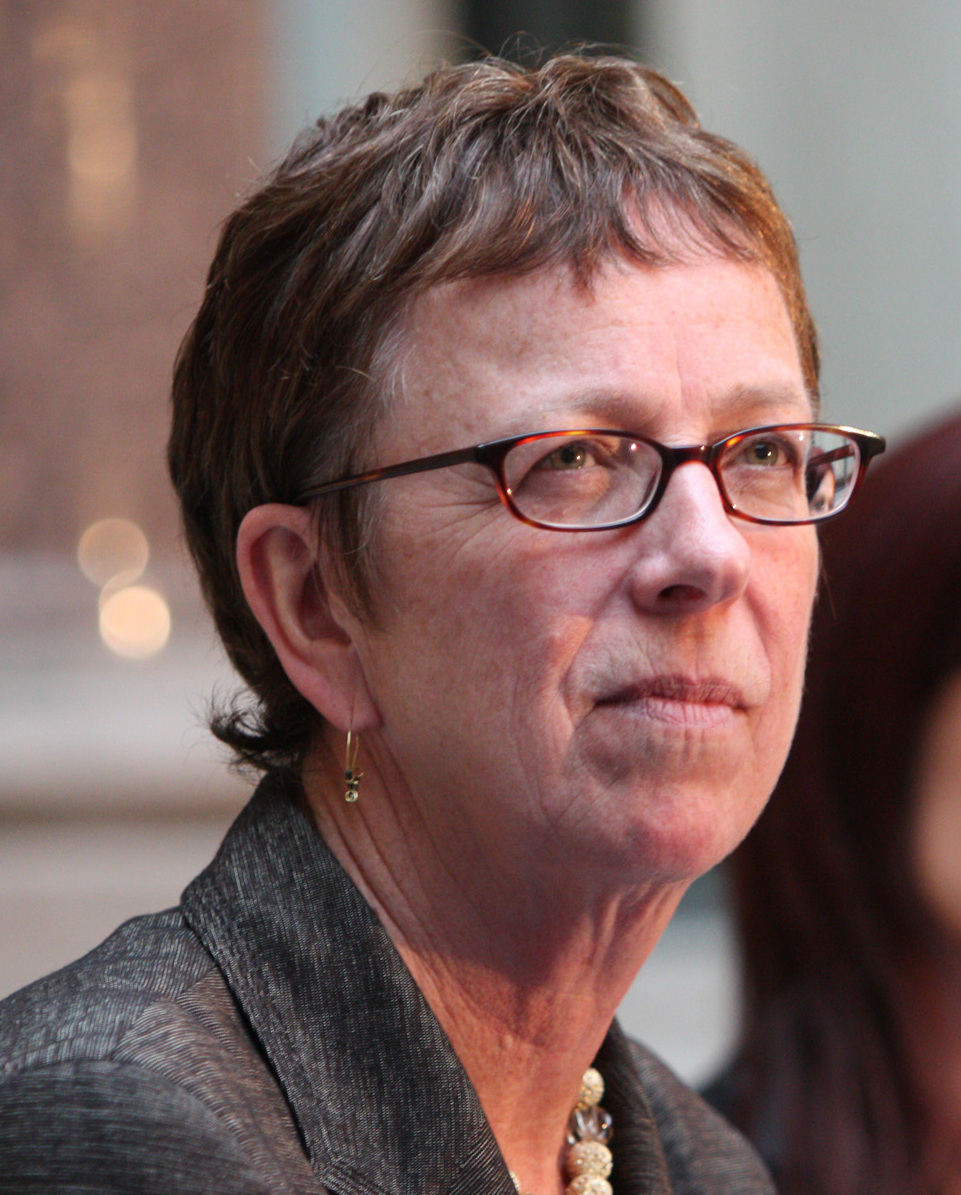
- Allen in 2013
- Born: 25 January 1955 (age 71)
- Education: Brasenose College; University of Oxford
- Employer: Amnesty International UK

Katherine Allen (born 25 January 1955) is a chief executive who served as the Director of Amnesty International UK (AIUK) from 2000 to 2021.

== Early life and education ==
Katherine Allen was the daughter of William Allen and Patricia Allen (née Middleton). She gained a BA (Hons) in philosophy, politics and economics at Brasenose College, Oxford. Allen was made an Honorary Fellow by the university in 2006.

== Career ==
Allen was a policy officer at the Greater London Council from 1977 to 1979. She then became a scientific officer at the Social Science Research Council (1979–80) and a policy officer at Haringey London Borough Council (1980–81). From 1981 to 1987, Allen was senior policy officer in Social Services for the Association of County Councils.

She was elected to Camden Council in 1982, representing Kilburn for the Labour Party. Whilst on the council, she was chair of the Women's Committee. In March 1990, whilst still a councillor, she attempted to become the Labour PPC for the marginal seat of Hampstead and Highgate, which included Kilburn. However, she lost out to the actress Glenda Jackson on the third ballot. Allen remained a councillor until the May 1990 local elections.

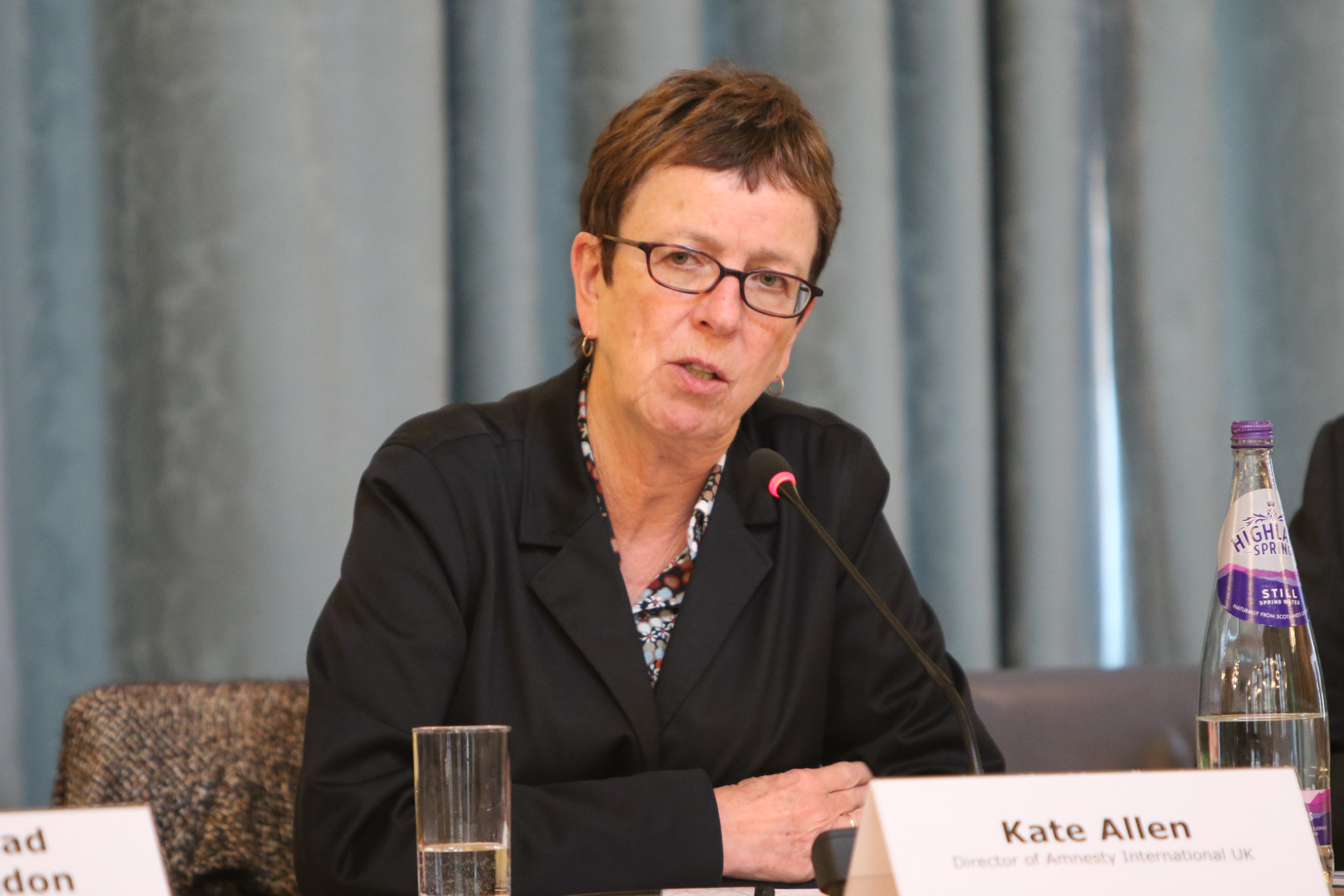
Allen speaks at the International Human Rights Day event held in the Foreign & Commonwealth Office in London on 10 December 2018.

She became deputy chief executive of the Refugee Council in 1987, a role she held until 1999. There, Allen headed the UK emergency evacuation programmes for Bosnia and Kosovo, and chaired the Asylum Rights Campaign during the passage of new asylum and immigration legislation. In 1998/99 she was seconded to the Home Office, where she worked on the 1999 Immigration and Asylum Act.

In 2000, Allen was appointed the UK Director of Amnesty International, the third-largest Amnesty section worldwide with more than a quarter of a million supporters; Allen undertook a major restructure, and established the Human Rights Action Centre in Shoreditch. Having appeared on BBC Question Time, in October 2005 she wrote a two-page article in The Observer newspaper, which launched an international campaign on Internet censorship and repression.

"While the internet has brought freedom of information to millions, for some it has led to imprisonment by a government seeking to curtail that freedom. They have closed or censored websites and blogs; created firewalls to prevent access to information; and restricted and filtered search engines to keep information from their citizens."

In March 2021, Allen announced she would be retiring from Amnesty International in September of the same year, after 21 years.

== Personal life ==
For 20 years, Allen was the partner of Ken Livingstone, former leader of the Greater London Council, then Member of Parliament, and later the first Mayor of London. Allen was one of the three Labour councillors representing Kilburn on Camden Council. The couple's relationship ended in 2001.
