= Andrew Gordon-Saker =

British Costs Judge (born 1958)

Andrew Stephen Gordon-Saker (born 4 October 1958) is a retired British Costs Judge. He was the Senior Costs Judge (Chief Taxing Master) between 1 October 2014 and 1 November 2024.

He was educated at Stonyhurst College and the University of East Anglia (LLB, 1980). He was called to the bar at Middle Temple in 1981, and served as a Conservative Party councillor on Camden London Borough Council from 1982 to 1986 for the Bloomsbury ward.

== Family ==
He is married to Liza Gordon-Saker, a British circuit judge.
