= Phil Turner (politician) =

British former politician

Leader of Camden Council
- In office 1982–1986
- Preceded by: Roy Shaw
- Succeeded by: Tony Dykes

Personal details
- Party: Labour

Philip J. Turner is a former English Labour Party politician, who led Camden Council from 1982 to 1986. He held many other positions on the council until 2006, when he lost his Kilburn seat to the Liberal Democrats.

Turner was elected to the Camden Council as a Labour councillor for St. Pancras in the 1982 election, and became leader of the council. According to columnist John Gulliver, during Turner's tenure as council leader in the 1980s, members of the public began to attend Town Hall committee meetings more regularly.

As council leader, Turner participated in the 1985 rate-capping rebellion against the Conservative government, which sought to restrict spending by local councils. In April 1985, he sent a letter to Camden ratepayers that the council found it impossible to set a rate, but two months later, he sent a second letter announcing that Camden had finally set a rate after all. Later that year, Turner hired John McDonnell as his policy advisor, after McDonnell was sacked by Ken Livingstone as deputy leader of the Greater London Council for his part in the rate-capping rebellion.

In 1994, as chairman of the Camden leisure committee, Turner promoted a scheme to improve, publicise, and encourage visits to Hampstead Cemetery as a historical site.

As head of the council's leisure and community services committee in 1999, Turner proposed closing three libraries in Camden, and replacing them with high-tech "super libraries". Thirteen Labour councillors including Aileen Hammond voted against the party whip, and the libraries were saved. Turner later acknowledged that the rebels had been right, and that he had been wrong.

Turner was the Labour Parliamentary Candidate for Hampstead and Highgate in 1987.
