= Tony Dykes =

British former politician

Leader of Camden Council
- In office 1986–1990
- Preceded by: Phil Turner
- Succeeded by: Julie Fitzgerald

Personal details
- Born: Anthony Dykes
- Party: Labour

Anthony Dykes is a former English Labour Party politician and Anti-Apartheid activist.

Dykes was a councillor on Camden Council for King's Cross ward from 1982 until 1990 and Caversham ward from 1990 until standing down in 1994. A year after his election, in 1983, Dykes became Chair of Policy and Resources, a role he continued in until his election as leader of Camden Council in 1986. In 1990, he stood down as leader and returned to being Chair of Policy and Resources until 1993, when he became deputy leader until standing down in the 1994 election.

As leader of Camden Council, Dykes replaced the more leftwing Phil Turner. Initially, the more leftwing Kate Allen was elected as leader but the London Region of the Labour Party intervened due to procedural discrepancies. Dykes used the office as leader to campaign against nuclear power, challenge over-staffing at the council and reduce the number of people eligible for council housing. During his time on the council, Dykes supported the Council’s policy of boycotting South African products.

Dykes was heavily involved in the Anti-Apartheid Movement and, in August 1993, was appointed Head of Southern Africa at Christian Aid, until being appointed as Director of Action for Southern Africa from 2007 to 2018.
