= Camden London Borough Council =

Local authority in England

- Coat of arms

- Council logo

Type
- Type: London borough council of the London Borough of Camden
- Houses: Unicameral

Leadership
- Mayor: Tricia Leman, Labour since 20 May 2026
- Leader: James Slater, Labour since 16 November 2026
- Chief Executive: Jon Rowney since 4 August 2025

Structure
- Seats: 55 councillors
- Political groups: Administration (31) Labour (31) Opposition (24) Green (10) Liberal Democrats (10) Conservative (3) Camden People's Alliance (1)
- Length of term: Whole council elected every four years

Elections
- Voting system: Plurality at-large (FPTP)
- Last election: 7 May 2026

Meeting place
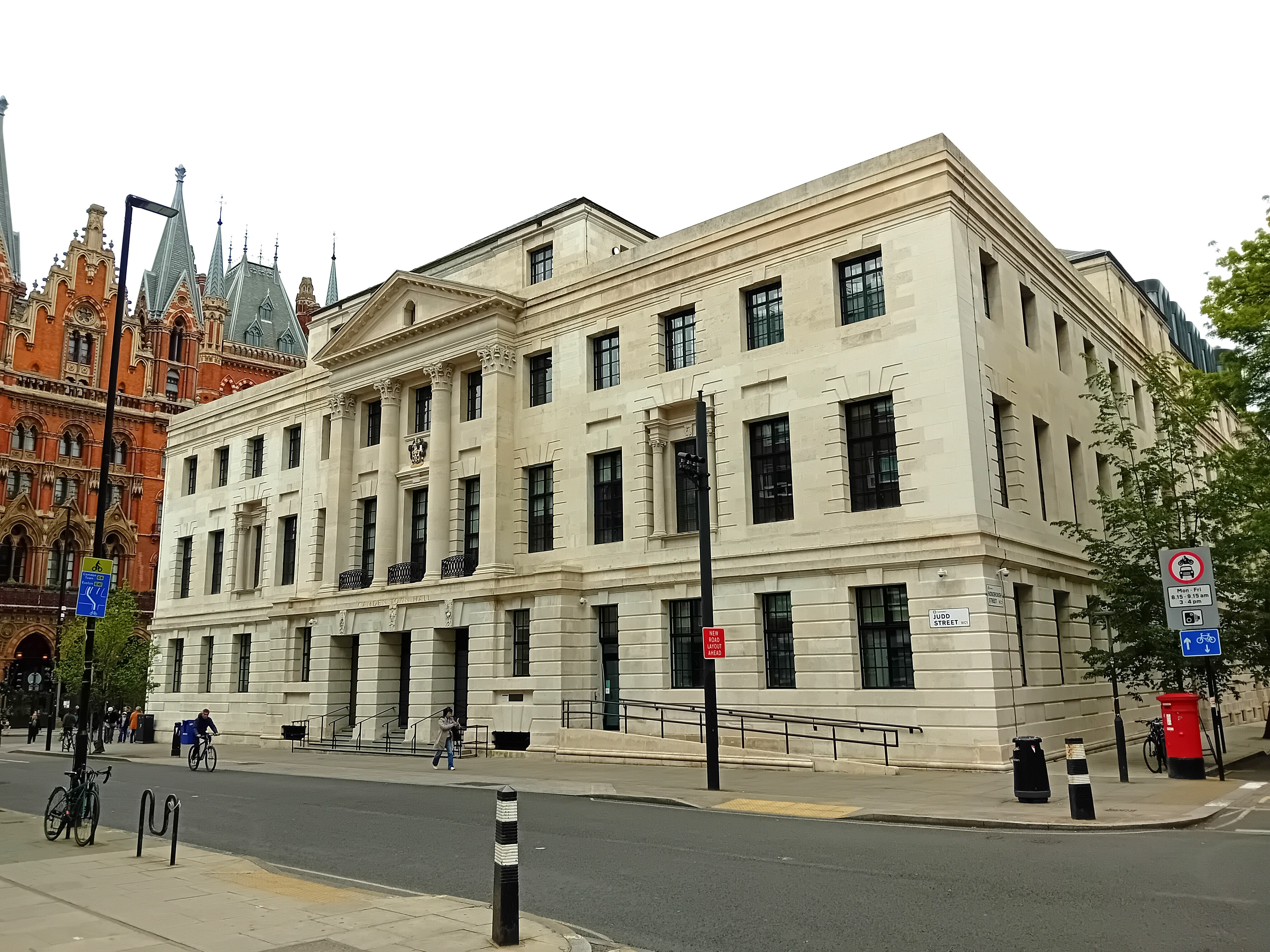
- Camden Town Hall, Judd Street, London, WC1H 9JE

Website
- www.camden.gov.uk

Camden London Borough Council, also known as Camden Council and legally as The Mayor and Burgesses of the London Borough of Camden, is the local authority for the London Borough of Camden in Greater London, England. The council is responsible for the provision of a range of services within the borough. The council has been under Labour majority control since 2010. The council meets at Camden Town Hall and their other premises.

== History ==
The London Borough of Camden and its council were created under the London Government Act 1963, with the first election held in 1964. For its first year the council acted as a shadow authority alongside the area's three outgoing authorities, the metropolitan boroughs of Hampstead, Holborn and St Pancras. The new council formally came into its powers on 1 April 1965, at which point the old boroughs and their councils were abolished.

The council's full legal name is "The Mayor and Burgesses of the London Borough of Camden", but it styles itself Camden Council.

From 1965 until 1986 the council was a lower-tier authority, with upper-tier functions provided by the Greater London Council. The split of powers and functions meant that the Greater London Council was responsible for "wide area" services such as fire, ambulance, flood prevention, and refuse disposal; with the boroughs (including Camden) responsible for "personal" services such as social care, libraries, cemeteries and refuse collection. The Greater London Council was abolished in 1986 and its functions passed to the London Boroughs, with some services provided through joint committees. Camden became a local education authority in 1990 when the Inner London Education Authority was dissolved.

Since 2000 the Greater London Authority has taken some responsibility for highways and planning control from the council, but within the English local government system the council remains a "most purpose" authority in terms of the available range of powers and functions.

== Powers and functions ==
The local authority derives its powers and functions from the London Government Act 1963 and subsequent legislation. It sets council tax and as a billing authority it also collects precepts for Greater London Authority functions and business rates. It sets planning policies which complement Greater London Authority and national policies, and decides on most planning applications. It is a local education authority and is also responsible for council housing, including sheltered housing such as Henderson Court, libraries, waste collection and disposal, traffic management and public roads, and environmental health.

The council is responsible for social services provision and in 2025 the Care Quality Commission rated Camden Councils Greenwood Centre as outstanding for its adult social care provision.

The council licenses street trading throughout the borough, including the following markets:

- Chalton Street Market
- Earlham Street Market
- Goodge Place Market
- Inverness Street Market
- Leather Lane Market
- Plender Street Market
- Queen's Crescent Market
- Swiss Cottage Market

== Political control ==
The council has been under Labour majority control since 2010.

The first election to the council was held in 1964, initially operating as a shadow authority alongside the outgoing authorities until the new arrangements came into effect on 1 April 1965. Political control of the council since 1965 has been as follows:

Party in control	Years
Labour	1965–1968
Conservative	1968–1971
Labour	1971–2006
No overall control (Liberal Democrats–Conservative coalition)	2006–2010
Labour	2010–present

=== Leadership ===
The role of mayor is largely ceremonial in Camden. Political leadership is instead provided by the leader of the council. The leaders since 1965 have been:

Councillor	Party	From	To
Charlie Ratchford	Labour	1965	1968
Geoffrey Finsberg	Conservative	1968	1970
Martin Morton	Conservative	1970	1971
Millie Miller	Labour	1971	1973
Frank Dobson	Labour	1973	1975
Roy Shaw	Labour	1975	1982
Phil Turner	Labour	1982	1986
Tony Dykes	Labour	1986	1990
Julie Fitzgerald	Labour	1990	1993
Richard Arthur	Labour	1993	17 May 2000
Jane Roberts	Labour	17 May 2000	7 Nov 2005
Raj Chada	Labour	8 Nov 2005	May 2006
Keith Moffitt	Liberal Democrats	24 May 2006	May 2010
Nash Ali	Labour	26 May 2010	May 2012
Sarah Hayward	Labour	16 May 2012	17 May 2017
Georgia Gould (Note: Councillor Pat Callaghan (Labour) took on the role of acting leader during Gould's maternity leave from September 2023 until early 2024 and then again during July 2024 following Gould's resignation upon being elected as an MP.)	Labour	17 May 2017	11 July 2024
Richard Olszewski	Labour	22 July 2024	May 2026
Sagal Abdi-Wali	Labour	20 May 2026	16 November 2026
James Slater	Labour	16 November 2026	Present

=== Composition ===
Following the 2026 election and a subsequent by-election in July 2026, the composition of the council is as follows:

Party	Councillors
Labour	31
Green	10
Liberal Democrats	10
Conservative	3
CPA	1
Total	55

The next election is due in May 2030.

== Wards ==
The wards of Camden and the number of seats:

1. Belsize (3)
2. Bloomsbury (3)
3. Camden Square (2)
4. Camden Town (2)
5. Fortune Green (3)
6. Frognal (2)
7. Gospel Oak (3)
8. Hampstead Town (2)
9. Haverstock (3)
10. Highgate (3)
11. Holborn & Covent Garden (3)
12. Kentish Town North (2)
13. Kentish Town South (3)
14. Kilburn (3)
15. King's Cross (3)
16. Primrose Hill (3)
17. Regent's Park (3)
18. South Hampstead (3)
19. St Pancras & Somers Town (3)
20. West Hampstead (3)

== Premises ==
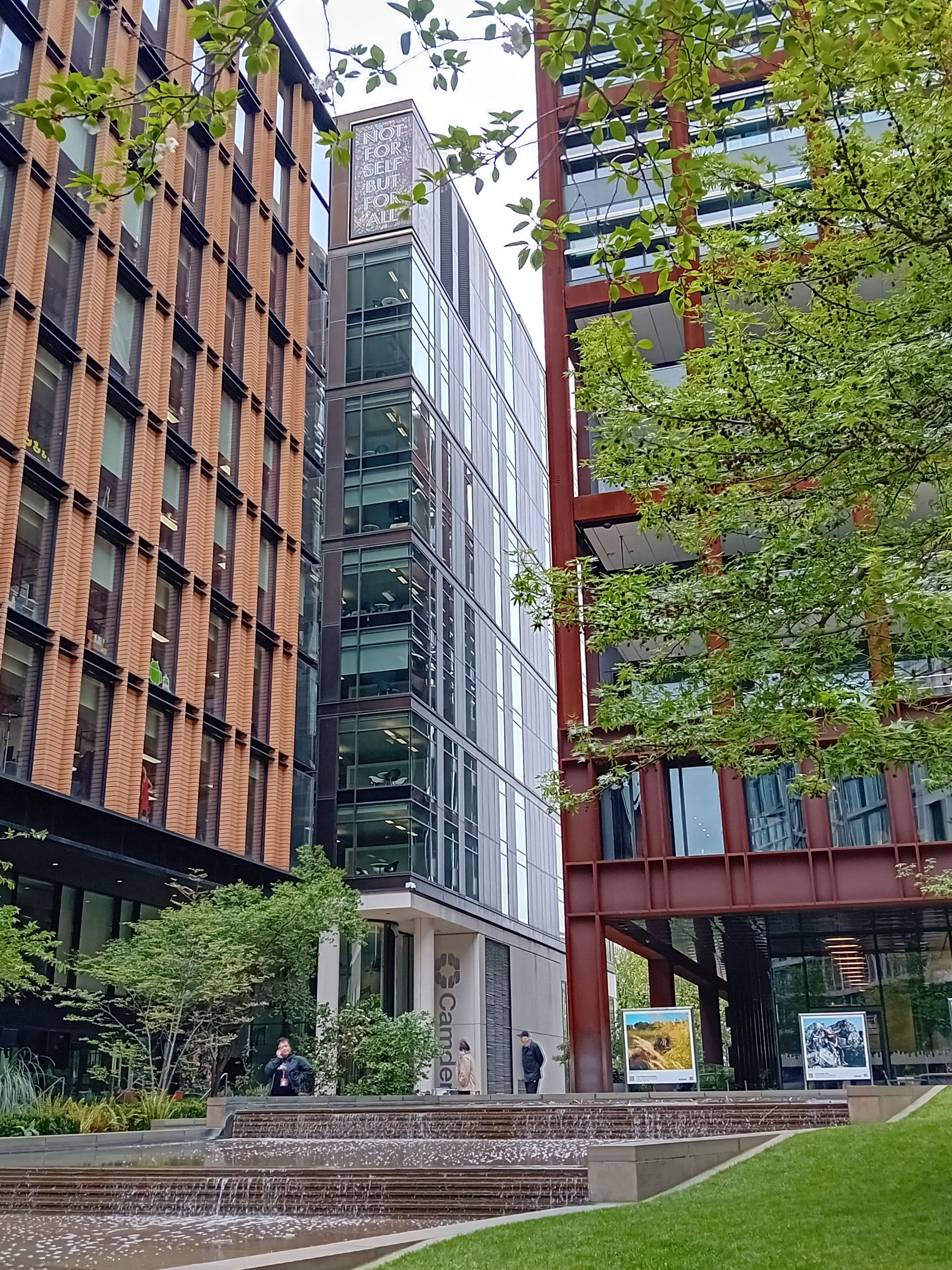
5 Pancras Square, London, N1C 4AG: Council's main offices, completed 2014

The council meets at Camden Town Hall on Judd Street, which was completed in 1937 for the old St Pancras Borough Council, originally being known as St Pancras Town Hall. The council's main offices are at 5 Pancras Square, which was purpose-built for the council as part of the regeneration of the King's Cross area, being completed in 2014.

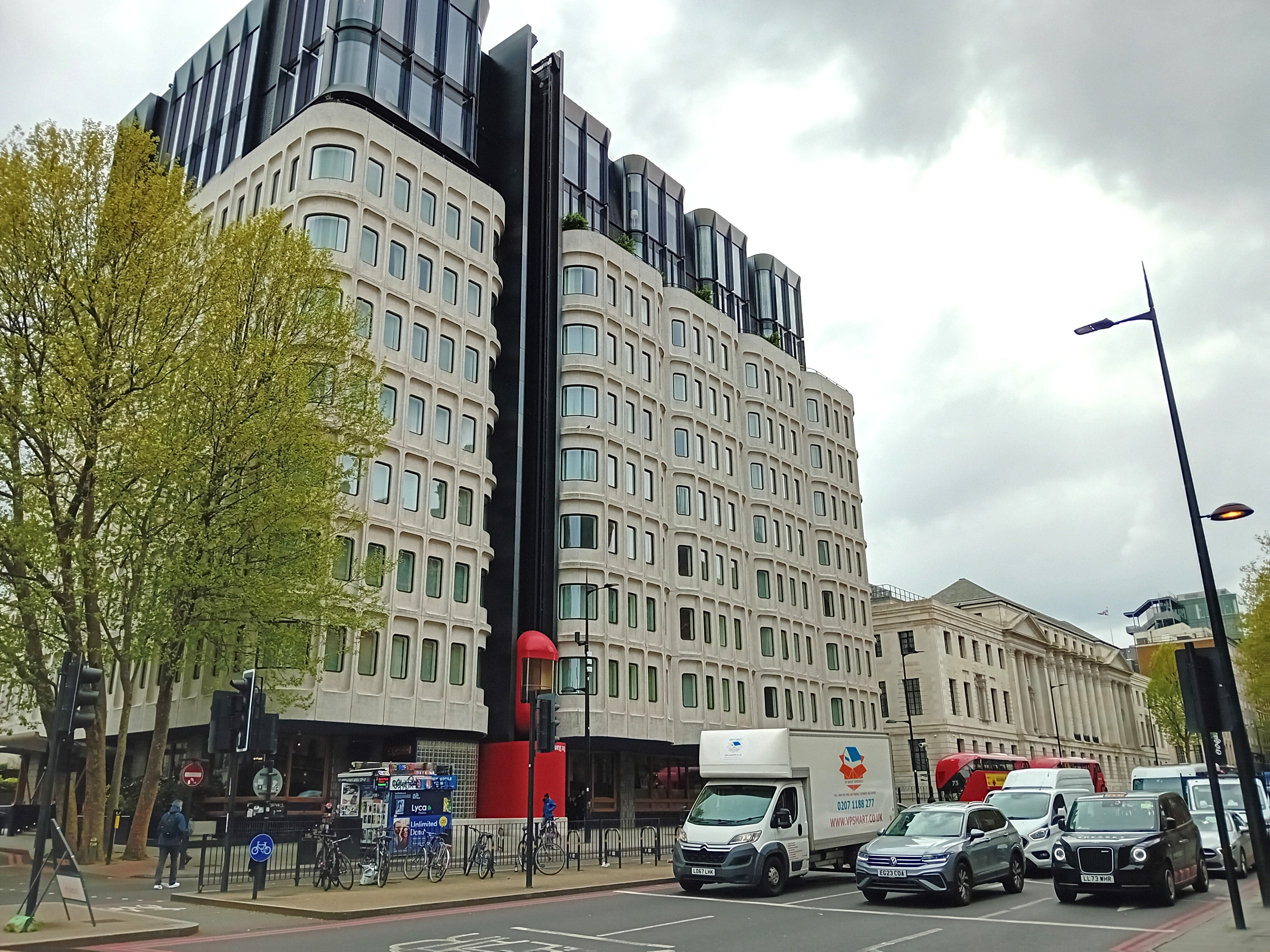
Former Town Hall Annexe (now The Standard Hotel) at corner of Argyle Street and Euston Road: Council's main offices 1977–2014

Prior to 2014 the council's main offices were at the Town Hall Annexe, which had been completed in 1977 at the corner of Argyle Street and Euston Road, immediately east of the Town Hall. The Town Hall Annexe was subsequently converted into a hotel.

== Elections ==
A map showing the wards of Camden since 2022

Since the last boundary changes in 2022 the council has comprised 55 councillors representing 20 wards, with each ward electing two or three councillors. Elections are held every four years.

The wards are:

- Belsize
- Bloomsbury
- Camden Square
- Camden Town
- Fortune Green
- Frognal
- Gospel Oak
- Hampstead Town
- Haverstock
- Highgate
- Holborn and Covent Garden
- Kentish Town North
- Kentish Town South
- Kilburn
- King's Cross
- Primrose Hill
- Regent's Park
- South Hampstead
- St Pancras and Somers Town
- West Hampstead

== Criticisms ==
=== DVLA Data Mis-use ===
In 2012 it was reported that Camden Council was one of several local authorities to have been banned from accessing information from the Driver and Vehicle Licensing Agency. This information is normally made available to local authorities for purposes such as enforcing parking fines, but access can be withdrawn if they are found to be mis-using the service. The Big Brother Watch organisation, which obtained the information about the ban under a Freedom of Information request, claimed that "the public are right to be worried that their privacy is at risk across a range of government services."

=== Local employment imbalance ===
Following Freedom of Information requests in 2020, it was discovered that only 16% of Camden's employees live within the borough, and that many of its employees live as far afield as Scotland and Northern Ireland.

It was also discovered that senior employees were more likely to live further away from Camden, with a spokesperson saying that finding employees with specialised skillsets near to the borough was 'almost impossible'. Camden stated in response that all their staff are provided with one day's extra leave for volunteering, with a 'focus on Camden'.

Statistics also showed that only a single employee lived in Camden's three Central London wards, despite comprising almost a quarter of the borough's size and population.

=== Social housing ===
In November 2024, the Housing Ombudsman published a special investigation into Camden Council's management of social housing. The investigation was prompted by a significant volume of severe maladministration rulings. They found evidence of a defensive complaints culture. The main areas of concern identified were complaint management, disrepair and how vulnerable tenants were treated. One tenant had to live with damp and mould, for over three years, severely impacting the tenant's mental health.

== Notable councillors ==
- Nasim Ali (Labour, Regents Park 2002–present), Leader of Camden London Borough Council 2010–12; Mayor of Camden 2003–04 and 2022–23; first Bangladeshi and first Muslim mayor.
- Katherine Allen (Labour, Kilburn 1982–90), Director of Amnesty International UK (AIUK) 2000–21.
- Lucy Anderson (Labour, Kentish Town 2002–06), Member of the European Parliament (MEP) for the London region 2014–19.
- Richard Arthur (Labour, Bloomsbury 1971–74; Belsize 1974–76; Highgate 1990–2002), Leader of Camden London Borough Council 1993–2000; Camden and Islington NHS Foundation Trust 2009–13.
- Siobhan Baillie (Conservative, Frognal and Fitzjohns 2014–18), Member of Parliament (MP) for Stroud 2019–2024.
- Hugh Bayley (Labour, Chalk Farm 1982–86), MP for York 1992–97; MP for City of York 1997–2010; MP for York Central 2010–15; Parliamentary Under-Secretary of State for Social Security 1999–2001; Deputy Speaker of the House of Commons First Deputy Chair of Ways and Means 2010; President of the NATO Parliamentary Assembly 2012–14.
- Danny Beales (Labour, Cantelowes 2014–22; Camden Square 2022–24), Member of Parliament (MP) for Uxbridge and South Ruislip since 2024.
- Siân Berry (Green, Highgate 2014–23), Member of the London Assembly (AM) 2016–24; Co-Leader of the Green Party of England and Wales 2018–2021; Member of Parliament (MP) for Brighton Pavilion since 2024.
- Geoffrey Bindman (Labour, St Johns 1971–74), Chair of the British Institute of Human Rights since 2005.
- Nicholas Bosanquet (Labour, Camden 1974–82), British health economist; Chair of the Fabian Society 1974–75.
- Edward Bowman (Conservative, Alderman 1964–74), MEP for Lancashire East 1979–84; MEP for Hampshire Central 1988–94; MEP for Itchen, Test and Avon 1994–99.
- Peter Brooke (Conservative, Highgate 1968–69), MP for City of London and Westminster South 1977–97; Cities of London and Westminster 1997–2001; Chairman of the Conservative Party 1987–89; Paymaster General 1987–89; Secretary of State for Northern Ireland 1989–92; Secretary of State for National Heritage 1992–94.
- Leila Campbell (Labour, Priory 1965–68; Alderman 1971–78), Chair of the Inner London Education Authority (ILEA) 1977–78; Vice Chair 1967–77.
- Raj Chada (Labour, Gospel Oak 2002–06), Leader of Camden London Borough Council 2005–06.
- Pamela Chesters (Conservative, Frognal 1994–2001), Leader of the Opposition on Camden London Borough Council 1998–2000; Advisor for Health and Youth Opportunities to the Mayor of London, Boris Johnson 2009–12; Chair of Central London Community Healthcare NHS Trust 2012–16; Chair of Anchor Trust 2013–18.
- Adrian Cohen (Labour, Hampstead Town 2022), founder of the London Jewish Forum.
- Oliver Cooper (Conservative, Hampstead Town 2015–22), Leader of the Opposition on Camden London Borough Council 2018–22.
- Frank Dobson (Labour, Holborn 1971–76); Leader of Camden London Borough Council 1973–75; MP for Holborn and St Pancras South 1979–83; MP for Holborn and St Pancras 1983–2015; Secretary of State for Health 1997–99.
- Peggy Duff (Labour, Camden 1965–68), the first General Secretary of the Campaign for Nuclear Disarmament (CND).
- Anthony Dykes (Labour, King's Cross 1982–90; Caversham 1990–94), Leader of Camden London Borough Council 1986–90; Director of Action for Southern Africa 2007–18.
- Maryam Eslamdoust (Labour, Kilburn 2010–22), Mayor of Camden 2019–20; first Iranian-born woman to hold public office in Great Britain; General Secretary of the Transport Salaried Staffs' Association (TSSA) 2023–present.
- Geoffrey Finsberg (Conservative, Hampstead Central 1964–71; West End 1971–74), MP for Hampstead 1970–83 and Hampstead & Highgate 1983–92.
- Samuel Fisher (Labour, St Pancras 1964–71; Alderman 1971–78), Mayor of Stoke Newington 1953–54; Chairman of Camden London Borough Council shadow authority 1964; first Mayor of Camden 1965–66; last chairman of the Metropolitan Water Board 1973–74; Board of Deputies of British Jews 1973–79.
- Neil Fletcher (Labour, Kilburn 1978–82), last Leader of the Inner London Education Authority (ILEA) 1979–90.
- Simon Fletcher (Labour, St Pancras 1993–94), political strategist and campaigner.
- Sally Gimson (Labour, Highgate 2011–18).
- Andrew Gordon-Saker (Conservative, Bloomsbury 1982–86), Senior Costs Judge of England and Wales since 2014.
- Georgia Gould (Labour, Kentish Town 2010–22; Kentish Town South 2022–24), Leader of Camden London Borough Council 2017–24; Member of Parliament (MP) for Queen's Park and Maida Vale since 2024; Minister of State for School Standards since 2025.
- Alan Greengross (Conservative, Holborn 1964–71; Alderman 1970–74; Hampstead Town 1974–78; Frognal 1978–90), final leader of the Conservative Party on the Greater London Council 1983–86; Director South West Trains 2001–07.
- Lloyd Hatton (Labour, Kilburn 2022–24), MP for South Dorset since 2024.
- Sarah Hayward (Labour, King's Cross 2010–18), Leader of Camden London Borough Council 2012–17.
- Roger Jowell (Labour, Alderman 1971–78), Founder Social and Community Planning Research.
- Tessa Jowell (Labour, Swiss Cottage 1971–74; Gospel Oak 1974–86), MP for Dulwich 1992–97; MP for Dulwich and West Norwood 1997–2015; Minister of State (Minister for Public Health) 1997–99; Minister for Women 1998–2001 and 2005–06; Minister of State (Minister for Employment, Welfare to Work and Equal Opportunities) 1999–2001; Secretary of State for Culture, Media and Sport 2001–07; Minister for the Olympics 2005–10; Paymaster General 2007–10; Minister for London 2007–08 and 2009–10; Minister for the Cabinet Office 2009–10.
- Elaine Kellett (Conservative, Alderman 1968–74), MEP for Cumbria 1979–84; MP for Lancaster 1970–97.
- Tony Kerpel (Conservative, Swiss Cottage 1974–78; Belsize 1978–86), Personal assistant to Prime Minister Edward Heath; special adviser to Chairman of the Conservative Party Kenneth Baker 1986–92; adviser to South African State President F. W. de Klerk 1993–94; Leader of the Opposition on Camden London Borough Council 1981–85.
- Claire-Louise Leyland (Conservative, Belsize 2010–18), Leader of the Opposition on Camden London Borough Council 2014–18.
- Nathalie Lieven (Labour, Somers Town 1994–98), Judge of the High Court, Family Division since 2019.
- Ken Livingstone (Labour, Kilburn 1978–82), Member of the Greater London Council (GLC) 1973–86; Leader of the GLC 1981–86; MP Brent East 1987–2001; Mayor of London 2000–08 (Independent 2000–04, Labour 2004–08).
- Archie Macdonald (Conservative, Hampstead Town 1971–76), Liberal MP for Roxburgh and Selkirk 1950–51.
- Angela Mason (Labour, Cantelowes 2010–22), Chairman of The Fawcett Society since 2007; Director of Stonewall 1992–2002.
- Millie Miller (Labour, Euston 1964–68; Alderman 1968–71; Grafton 1971–74), MP for Ilford North 1974–77, Leader of Camden London Borough Council 1971–73 and the first woman to lead a London Borough council.
- David Mills (Labour, Belsize 1974–78).
- John Mills (Labour, Regents Park 1971–85; Gospel Oak 1990–2006), founder of British consumer products company JML (John Mills Limited).
- Keith Moffitt (Liberal Democrats, West End 1992–2002; West Hampstead 2002–14), Leader of Camden London Borough Council 2006–10.
- Thomas Morris (Conservative, King's Cross 1968–71), Magistrate; Mayor of St Pancras 1961–62.
- Henry Newman (Conservative, Frognal and Fitzjohns 2018–22), political advisor.
- Chris Philp (Conservative, Gospel Oak 2006–10), MP for Croydon South since 2015; Minister for London 2019–20; Parliamentary Under-Secretary of State for Immigration Compliance and Courts 2019–21; Parliamentary Under-Secretary of State for Tech and the Digital Economy 2021–22; Chief Secretary to the Treasury 2022; Minister for the Cabinet Office and Paymaster General 2022; Minister of State for Crime, Policing and Fire 2022–24; Shadow Leader of the House of Commons 2024–present.
- Luisa Porritt (Liberal Democrats, Belsize 2018–22), MEP for London 2019–20.
- Flick Rea (Alliance, Fortune Green 1986–90; Liberal Democrats, Fortune Green 1990–2021), Leader of the Liberal Democrat Group, former Chair of the Local Government Association's Culture, Tourism and Sports Board and member of the London Arts Council
- Dame Jane Roberts (Labour, Castlehaven 1990–2002; Haverstock 2002–06), Leader of Camden London Borough Council 2000–05.
- Phil Rosenberg (Labour, West Hampstead 2014–18), President of the Board of Deputies of British Jews since 2024.
- Nadia Shah (Labour, Regents Park 2014–present), Mayor of Camden 2016–17.
- Roy Shaw (Labour, Grafton 1964–2002; Haverstock 2002–07), Leader of Camden London Borough Council 1975–82.
- Tulip Siddiq (Labour, Regents Park 2010–14), MP for Hampstead and Kilburn 2015–2024; MP for Hampstead and Highgate since 2024; Economic Secretary to the Treasury and Cities Minister since 2024.
- Nick Smith (Labour, Kings Cross 1998–2006), MP for Blaenau Gwent 2010–2024; MP for Blaenau Gwent and Rhymney since 2024.
- Derek Spencer (Conservative, Highgate 1978–82; Swiss Cottage 1982–83), MP for Leicester South 1983–87; MP for Brighton Pavilion 1992–97.
- Jock Stallard (Labour, Grafton 1964–71; Alderman 1971–78), MP for St Pancras North 1970–83; Member of the House of Lords and Lord Temporal 1983–2008 (his death).
- Paul Stinchcombe (Labour, Brunswick 1990–94), MP for Wellingborough 1997–2005.
- Laura Trott (Conservative, Frognal and Fitzjohns 2010–14), MP for Sevenoaks since 2019; Chief Secretary to the Treasury 2023–24; Parliamentary Under-Secretary of State for Pensions 2022–23.
- Frederick Tuckman (Conservative, Adelaide 1968–71), MEP for Leicester 1979–89.
- Phil Turner (Labour, Camden 1971–78; Caversham 1978–82; St Pancras 1982–86; Priory 1986–2002; Kilburn 2002–06), Leader of Camden London Borough Council 1982–86.
- Piers Wauchope (Conservative, Adelaide 1998–2002; Belsize 2002–06), Leader of the Opposition on Camden London Borough Council 2000–06, interim leader of the UK Independence Party (UKIP) 2019.
- Alan Wood (Labour, Kilburn 1982–90), Corporate director for Children and Young People's Services in the London Borough of Hackney 2006–15.
