= Roy Shaw (politician) =

British Labour politician (1925–2008)

Leader of Camden Council
- In office 1975–1982
- Preceded by: Frank Dobson
- Succeeded by: Phil Turner

Labour Group Leader on Camden Council
- In office 1975–1982
- Preceded by: Frank Dobson
- Succeeded by: Phil Turner

Mayor of Camden
- In office 1999–2000
- Preceded by: Bob Hall
- Succeeded by: Heather Johnson

Camden councillor for Haverstock
- In office 2002–2007
- Succeeded by: Matt Sanders

Camden councillor for Grafton
- In office 1965–2002

Personal details
- Born: Roy Edwin Shaw; 21 July 1925 Hampstead, London, England
- Died: 4 January 2008 (aged 82)
- Party: Labour

Roy Edwin Shaw OBE (21 July 1925 – 4 January 2008) was a Labour Party politician in London, England. He was the Leader of Camden London Borough Council from 1975 to 1982, serving on Camden Council and its predecessor councils continuously for 51 years until just before his death, making him the longest-serving councillor in the UK. Shaw was known nationally as an expert on local government.

== Early life and education ==
Roy Shaw was born in 1925 to Edwin Victor and Edith Lily Shaw in Hampstead as the only son in a family of six children. His family home was in Highfield Road, West Hampstead. He was educated at Emmanuel Infant School and Beckford Junior School, before winning a scholarship to William Ellis, which was a grammar school at the time. His academic ambitions were stalled by his father's sudden death, and Shaw left school aged 16 to work as a clerk for the tobacconist W.D. & H.O. Wills.

Shaw joined the army in December 1943, during the Second World War. After six weeks' basic training, he joined the Royal Armoured Corps, and in August 1944, was sent to France with a tank as a reinforcement. He was at the forefront of efforts to liberate the occupied country. It was later said by his council colleagues that "his experience of war gave him the desire to help others and led him into politics." Shaw joked about his service: "Army life was tough, but good training for Camden Labour Group meetings in the 1970s and 1980s."

It was not until 1947 that Shaw was demobbed, whereupon he applied to become a civilian intelligence officer. Whilst at William Ellis, he had learnt German, and he was thus posted to Germany, where he helped to gather information on the British-Russian border. He served in the army until 1952.

== Career ==
Shaw joined the Labour Party in 1948, and was involved in the 1951 general election in Hampstead. In 1952, he moved to Kentish Town, and became secretary of Hampstead Constituency Labour Party.

He became a councillor in the Metropolitan Borough of Hampstead in 1956, representing the Kilburn ward and serving on the borough until 1962. He was an alderman in the Metropolitan Borough of St Pancras, a borough which he was a member of from 1962 to 1965. These were two of the three boroughs which were merged to create Camden Council in 1965.

Shaw was elected to represent the safe Labour ward of Grafton in 1964 and was re-elected in the ward at each subsequent election. In 1965, he became chief whip and deputy leader, roles he held until 1973. He was also chairman of the Planning Committee from 1967 to 1968, and chairman of the Finance Committee from 1971 to 1974. The following year, he was made leader of the council. Shaw became the leader of the Labour group and of the council on the resignation of Frank Dobson. He led Labour into the 1978 and 1982 elections, both of which they narrowly won. He was replaced as leader the day after the 1982 election by leftwing faction candidate Phil Turner. From 1990 to 1994, Shaw was the council's deputy leader.

Shaw was vice-chairman of the Association of Metropolitan Authorities from 1979 to 1983. He also served as deputy chairman and leader of the Labour Party on the London Boroughs Association. From 1999 to 2000, Shaw was Camden's mayor. He was elected to represent Haverstock, Grafton's successor ward, in 2002 and 2006 (when he almost lost his seat). He resigned from office in 2007 and was made the borough's first Honorary Alderman by the council in June that year, in a town hall ceremony which he was too ill to attend. There were tributes from the then-Mayor of London Ken Livingstone, Culture Secretary Tessa Jowell (herself a former Camden councillor), Holborn and St Pancras MP Frank Dobson and Lord Clarke of Hampstead.

Shaw worked for Tribune magazine. However, he was a leading "moderate", including being a founding member of the Labour Solidarity Campaign and backing Roy Hattersley's ultimately unsuccessful campaign to be leader of the party.

During his political career, he sat on a number of boards and committees, including as a part-time member of the London Electricity Board from 1977 to 1983. He was also a member of the Transport Users' Consultative Committee for London (1974–80). Shaw was part of the Advisory Committee on Local Government Audit from 1979 to 1982, and subsequently, the Audit Commission (1983–91), which he played a key role in the foundation of. Shaw was awarded an OBE in 1991 for his work in setting up the Audit Commission. From 1978 to 1984, Shaw was a member of the Consultative Council on Local Government Finances, and he was chairman of Camden Training Centre from 1990 to 1999. He sat on the London Fire and Civil Defence Authority as its deputy leader from 1999 to 2000. Shaw was a member of the London Fire and Emergency Planning Authority from 2000 to 2007; during this time, he was its vice chairman (2000–03) and deputy chairman (2003–04).

== Personal life and death ==
Shaw never married, but was "well known for his eye for the ladies". Outside of his work, he enjoyed The Guardian's cryptic crossword and opera music. He listed his recreations in Who's Who as "Listening to music; entertaining attractive women".

He lived in a small bedsit on Malden Road, but moved out in his later years, being cared for first at a home on Wellesley Road and subsequently at Ascham Court in Kentish Town. Shaw died aged 82 on 4 January 2008, survived by his remaining sister, Pam.

== Legacy ==
In July 2008, Camden Council named a new call centre and computer headquarters in South End Green after Shaw. The building is called The Roy Shaw Centre.
