= Alan Thorpe Richard Wood =

British public servant (born 1954)

Sir Alan Thorpe Richard Wood CBE (born 4 April 1954) is a British public servant who served from 2006 to 2015 as the corporate director for Children and Young People's Services in the London Borough of Hackney.

== Career ==
Born in Stepney, Wood read social sciences at the University of York and then trained as a teacher at University of Birmingham, working as a history teacher from 1977. From 1982 until 1990 he was a Labour local councillor for the London Borough of Camden for the Kilburn ward.

After 13 years as a teacher, Wood moved to work for the London Borough of Southwark's education department in 1990 as their head of pupil support and special educational needs. In 1997 he was promoted to deputy director of education, and in 2000 further still to director of education. After one year, in 2001 Wood moved to London Borough of Hackney as their director of education for another year.

Wood was made the chief executive of The Learning Trust when it was created in 2002,. This not-for-profit organisation was responsible for delivering all education services in Hackney until it was wound up in 2012, returning responsibility to the borough.

Wood then transferred to Hackney as their overall corporate director for Children and Young People's Services in 2006, whilst continuing at The Learning Trust. During this time, he reformed how Hackney delivered children's social work, developing the "Hackney model" of pooled rather than individual case assignment. Whilst at Hackney, Wood was appointed a Commander of the Order of British Empire in the Queen's Birthday Honours for 2011 "for services to education and local government". Wood also served as president of the Association of Directors of Children's Services for 2014–15. Wood retired from Hackney at the end of 2015.

Wood has been appointed by the Department for Education to lead several reviews into children's services, in Doncaster in 2013, Birmingham in 2014, and Tower Hamlets in 2015, and then an overall review into the rôle of local safeguarding children boards in 2016.

In late 2017, Wood was appointed as chair of the new residential care leadership board, and was appointed a Knight Bachelor in the 2018 New Year Honours "for services to children's social care and education".

In late 2024, Wood was commissioned to undertake a child safeguarding practice review into the behavioural policy at Mossbourne Victoria Park Academy and Mossbourne Community Academy.

== Controversy ==
The Guardian reported on 24 July 2014 that Wood was booed at the Joint Social Work and Social Education conference, following his remark in an interview with Social Guardian that universities were churning out "crap" Social Workers. His exact wording was: "(...) all these academics turning out crap social workers writing to the Guardian". The booing was initiated by Harry Ferguson, professor of Social Work at the University of Nottingham. He said: "Now I'm going to take a bit of a risk here – I thought a collective bonding experience would be for us on the count of three to all go 'boo'." Ferguson stated that Wood's remark was "appalling", arguing that Social Work needs an alternative narrative to the constant negativity that surrounds the profession.
