= Kilburn (Camden ward) =

Ward in the London Borough of Camden

- Electoral ward for the Camden London Borough Council
- Kilburn (Camden) ward boundaries since 2022
- Borough: Camden
- County: Greater London
- Population: 12,061 (2021) (Note: 2021 Census data reported for 2022 ward boundaries)
- Electorate: 8,157 (2022)
- Area: 0.6514 square kilometres (0.2515 sq mi) (2022)

Current electoral ward
- Created: 1965
- Number of members: 3
- Councillors: Eddie Hanson; Ash Atkinson; Andre Lopez-Turner
- ONS code: 00AGGR (2002–2022)
- GSS code: E05000140 (2002–2022); E05013665 (2022–present)

Kilburn is a ward in the London Borough of Camden, in the United Kingdom. The ward has existed since the creation of the borough on 1 April 1965 and was first used in the 1964 elections. The ward was redrawn in May 1978 and May 2002. The ward underwent minor boundary changes for the 2022 election. In 2018, the ward had an electorate of 8,548. The Boundary Commission projects the electorate to rise to 9,111 in 2025.

Kilburn is also the name of a ward of Brent Council.

== List of councillors ==
| Term | Councillor | Party |
|---|---|---|
| 2010–2022 | Maryam Eslamdoust | Labour |
| 2010–2022 | Thomas Gardiner | Labour |
| 2014–2022 | Douglas Beattie | Labour |
| 2022–present | Eddie Hanson | Labour |
| 2022–2024 | Lloyd Hatton | Labour |
| 2022–2026 | Nanouche Umeadi | Labour |
| 2024–2026 | Robert Thompson | Labour |
| 2026-present | Ash Atikson | Green |
| 2026-present | Andre-Lopez Turner | Green |

== Summary ==
Councillors elected by party at each general borough election.

- Labour
- Liberal Democrat
- Green

== Camden council elections since 2022 ==
There was a revision of ward boundaries in Camden in 2022.

=== 2026 election ===
The election took place on 7 May 2026.

Kilburn (3 seats)
| Party | Candidate | Votes | % | ±% |
|---|---|---|---|---|
| Labour | Eddie Hanson* | 970 | | |
| Green | Ash Atkinson | 954 | | |
| Green | Andre Lopez-Turner | 880 | | |
| Labour | Robert Thompson* | 828 | | |
| Green | Mukhtar Moalin | 795 | | |
| Labour | Nanouche Umeadi* | 732 | | |
| Conservative | Ben Storrs | 307 | | |
| Conservative | Rahoul Bhansali | 293 | | |
| Reform | Andrew Preston | 292 | | |
| Conservative | Carole Ricketts | 278 | | |
| Reform | Mac Harwood | 269 | | |
| Liberal Democrats | Tracey Shackle | 261 | | |
| Liberal Democrats | Hamir Patel | 220 | | |
| Liberal Democrats | Daviyan Kothari | 208 | | |
| Turnout | | | | |

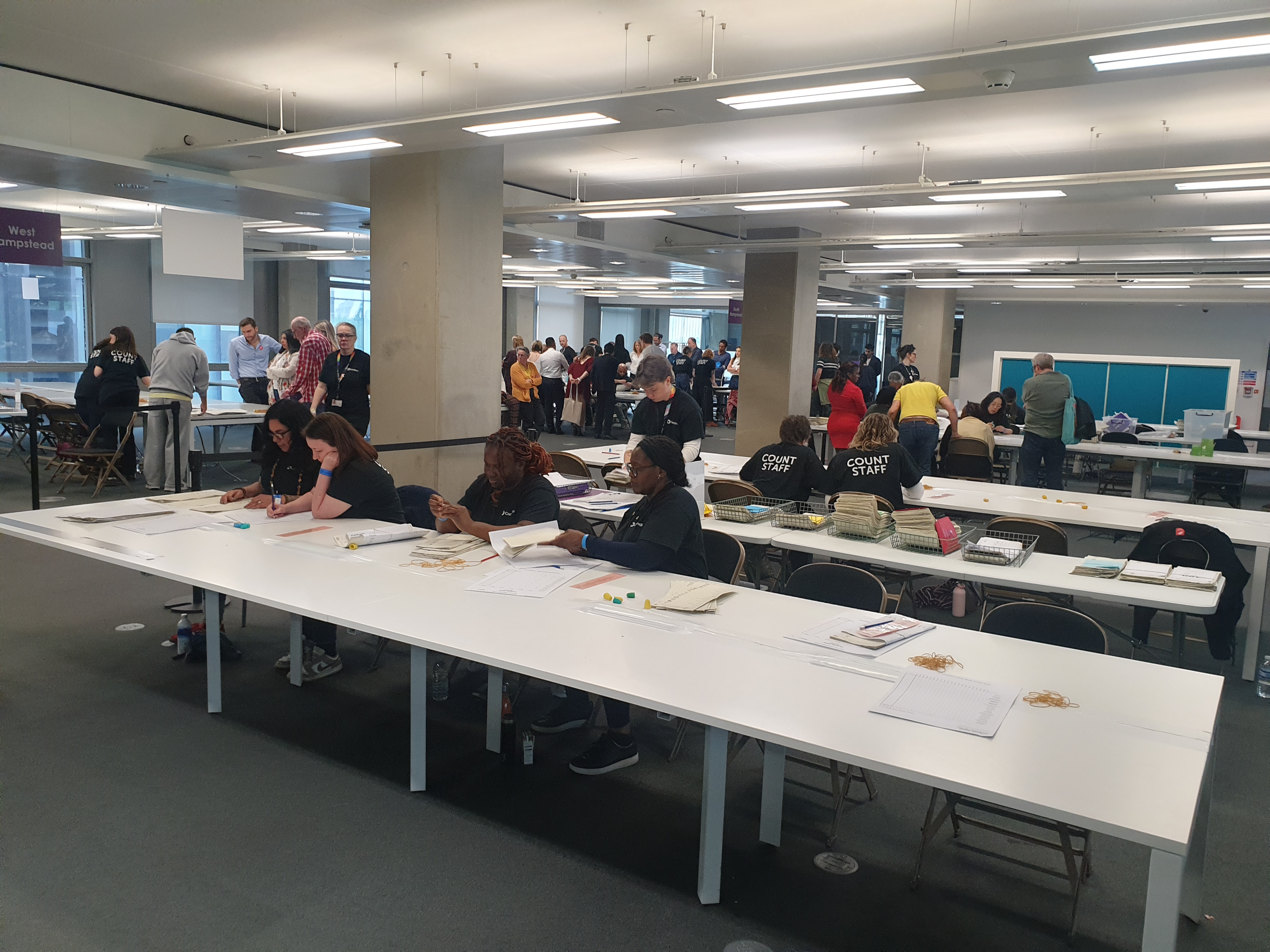
The count for the 7 May 2026 Camden Council elections in Kilburn ward

=== 2024 by-election ===
The by-election took place on 5 September 2024, following the resignation of Lloyd Hatton.

2024 Kilburn by-election
| Party | Candidate | Votes | % | ±% |
|---|---|---|---|---|
| Labour | Robert Thompson | 583 | 51.5 | −15.2 |
| Conservative | Peter Hornsby | 253 | 22.3 | +4.2 |
| Green | Michael Vieira | 198 | 17.5 | +17.5 |
| Liberal Democrats | David Elkan | 98 | 8.7 | −6.5 |
| Turnout | | | | |
| Labour hold | | Swing | | |

=== 2022 election ===
The election took place on 5 May 2022.

2022 Camden London Borough Council election: Kilburn
| Party | Candidate | Votes | % | ±% |
|---|---|---|---|---|
| Labour | Eddie Hanson | 1,646 | 68.2 | |
| Labour | Lloyd Hatton | 1,521 | 63.0 | |
| Labour | Nanouche Umeadi | 1,405 | 58.2 | |
| Conservative | Alexander Pelling-Bruce | 447 | 18.5 | |
| Conservative | Rahoul Bhansali | 395 | 16.4 | |
| Liberal Democrats | Kathryn Sturgeon | 375 | 15.5 | |
| Conservative | Marc Nykolyszyn | 340 | 14.1 | |
| Liberal Democrats | Hamir Patel | 288 | 11.9 | |
| Liberal Democrats | Daviyani Kothari | 286 | 11.8 | |
| Turnout | | 2,414 | 29.6 | |
| Labour win (new boundaries) | | | | |
| Labour win (new boundaries) | | | | |
| Labour win (new boundaries) | | | | |

== 2002–2022 Camden council elections ==
Kilburn (Camden) ward boundaries from 2002 to 2022

There was a revision of ward boundaries in Camden in 2002.

=== 2018 election ===
The election took place on 3 May 2018.

2018 Camden London Borough Council election: Kilburn
| Party | Candidate | Votes | % | ±% |
|---|---|---|---|---|
| Labour | Douglas Beattie | 1,733 | 61.5 | +11.2 |
| Labour | Maryam Eslamdoust | 1,722 | 61.1 | +12.3 |
| Labour | Thomas Gardiner | 1,613 | 57.2 | +10.5 |
| Conservative | Harry Richardson | 457 | 16.2 | +3.7 |
| Conservative | Georgina Stockley | 433 | 15.4 | +3.0 |
| Conservative | Sanjoy Sen | 416 | 14.8 | +4.0 |
| Liberal Democrats | James King | 390 | 13.8 | −12.9 |
| Liberal Democrats | Janet Grauberg | 385 | 13.7 | −12.8 |
| Liberal Democrats | Davi Kothari | 268 | 9.5 | −13.1 |
| Green | Matthew Spencer | 239 | 8.5 | −3.7 |
| Green | Carmen Mlagros Pilar Alcantara | 230 | 8.2 | −0.5 |
| Green | Sarah Nicoll | 225 | 8.0 | −0.4 |
| Turnout | | | 32.43 | |
| Labour hold | | Swing | | |
| Labour hold | | Swing | | |
| Labour hold | | Swing | | |

=== 2014 election ===
The election took place on 22 May 2014.

2014 Camden London Borough Council election: Kilburn
| Party | Candidate | Votes | % | ±% |
|---|---|---|---|---|
| Labour | Douglas Beattie | 1,661 | | |
| Labour | Maryam Eslamdoust | 1,611 | | |
| Labour | Thomas Gardine | 1,543 | | |
| Liberal Democrats | James King | 883 | | |
| Liberal Democrats | Janet Grauberg | 876 | | |
| Liberal Democrats | Jack Holroyde | 746 | | |
| Conservative | Nick Vose | 411 | | |
| Conservative | Tim Wainwright | 409 | | |
| Green | Sarah Astor | 402 | | |
| Conservative | John Whitehead | 357 | | |
| Green | Shelia Hayman | 286 | | |
| Green | Richard D. Bourn | 276 | | |
| Turnout | | | 38.3 | |
| Labour hold | | Swing | | |
| Labour hold | | Swing | | |
| Labour hold | | Swing | | |

=== 2010 election ===
Kilburn ward election, 7 May 2010
| Party | Candidate | Votes | % | ±% |
|---|---|---|---|---|
| Labour | Thomas Gardiner | 2,047 | | |
| Labour | Mike Katz | 1,819 | | |
| Labour | Maryam Eslamdoust | 1,788 | | |
| Liberal Democrats | Janet Grauberg* | 1,647 | | |
| Liberal Democrats | James King* | 1,497 | | |
| Liberal Democrats | Mukul Hira | 1,431 | | |
| Conservative | Will Davis | 1,059 | | |
| Conservative | Patricia Cook | 1,011 | | |
| Conservative | Sabah Hussain | 808 | | |
| Green | Helen Mayer | 391 | | |
| Green | Charlotte Whelan | 364 | | |
| Green | Lauren Paris | 327 | | |
| Independent | Francis Bacon | 90 | | |
| Turnout | | | | |
| Labour gain from Liberal Democrats | | Swing | | |
| Labour gain from Liberal Democrats | | Swing | | |
| Labour gain from Liberal Democrats | | Swing | | |

=== 2006 election ===
Kilburn (3)
| Party | Candidate | Votes | % | ±% |
|---|---|---|---|---|
| Liberal Democrats | David Abrahams | 1,122 | 40.4 | +23.9 |
| Liberal Democrats | Janet Grauberg | 1,084 | 39.0 | +24.3 |
| Liberal Democrats | James King | 1,071 | 38.5 | +25.4 |
| Labour | Aileen Hammond | 1,008 | 36.3 | −10.4 |
| Labour | John Rolfe * | 1,005 | 36.2 | −10.0 |
| Labour | Phil Turner * | 985 | 35.4 | −9.2 |
| Conservative | Andrew Cossar | 393 | 14.1 | −5.8 |
| Conservative | Carlo Banchero | 382 | 13.7 | −3.7 |
| Conservative | Sam Gyimah | 336 | 12.1 | −4.6 |
| Green | John Collins | 224 | 8.1 | −3.8 |
| Green | Sophia Mustoe | 214 | 7.7 | −4.8 |
| Green | Miriam Elkan | 188 | 6.8 | −3.1 |
| Turnout | | 8,012 | 34.7 | |
| Liberal Democrats gain from Labour | | Swing | | |
| Liberal Democrats gain from Labour | | Swing | | |
| Liberal Democrats gain from Labour | | Swing | | |

=== 2002 election ===
Kilburn (3)
| Party | Candidate | Votes | % | ±% |
|---|---|---|---|---|
| Labour | Charlie Hedges | 806 | 46.7 | |
| Labour | John Rolfe | 797 | 46.2 | |
| Labour | Phil Turner | 770 | 44.6 | |
| Conservative | Robert Graham | 343 | 19.9 | |
| Conservative | Rosette Irwin | 301 | 17.4 | |
| Conservative | Paul Mawdsley | 289 | 16.7 | |
| Liberal Democrats | Jeremy Allen | 285 | 16.5 | |
| Liberal Democrats | Sally Twite | 254 | 14.7 | |
| Liberal Democrats | Daviyani Kothari | 226 | 13.1 | |
| Green | Helen Mayer | 215 | 12.5 | |
| Green | John Collins | 205 | 11.9 | |
| Independent | David Reed | 174 | 10.1 | |
| Green | Debra Green | 171 | 9.9 | |
| CPA | Maria McCarten | 73 | 4.2 | |
| Turnout | | 4,909 | | |
