= Gary Raikes =

British fascist politician (born 1958)

Leader of the New British Union
- Incumbent
- Assumed office 2013
- Preceded by: Position established

Personal details
- Born: 10 August 1958 (age 68) Bristol, England
- Party: NBU (Since 2013)
- Other political affiliations: British National Party (formerly); Britain First (formerly)

Gary Raikes (born 10 August 1958) is a British politician who is leader of the New British Union (NBU), a neo-fascist group that claims to be a revival of Sir Oswald Mosley's British Union of Fascists. He was previously the leader in Scotland of the British National Party (BNP) and then Britain First.

In the 2007 Scottish elections, Raikes was a BNP candidate in the North East Scotland region.

Raikes was the BNP's prospective candidate for East Renfrewshire for the 2010 general election. When the BNP decided not to contest the seat, he stood in Aberdeenshire West & Kincardine instead, receiving 513 votes (1.1%).

Raikes' New British Union was formed in 2013. He has said on YouTube that the NBU does not intend to seek power through the ballot box, but would adapt to the conditions around it and maintain its fascist purity. Its constitution says that the NBU aims to be a registered political party but it has not registered with the Electoral Commission.

The party expounds a number of fascist policies and supports fascist groups such as Golden Dawn in Greece. It took part in a rally outside the Greek Embassy in London in support of Golden Dawn. It has few members, and has been accused of appointing to regional officer posts people who were not members or supporters. Raikes has been photographed dressed in full fascist uniform and members are encouraged to dress in Blackshirt style uniforms.

In 2024, The Times reported that 41 of the Reform UK candidates for the 2024 general election were Facebook friends with Raikes, including Robert Kenyon, their candidate for the 2026 Makerfield by-election.

== Elections contested ==
Scottish Parliament election

Date of election	Constituency	Party	Votes	%
2007	North East Scotland	BNP	2,764	1.1

UK general elections

Date of election	Constituency	Party	Votes	%
2010	Aberdeenshire West & Kincardine	BNP	513	1.1
