= 2026 Arbroath and Broughty Ferry by-election =

2026 United Kingdom parliamentary by-election

- 18 June 2026

Arbroath and Broughty Ferry constituency
- Registered: 75,985
- Turnout: 23,870; 31.4% (▼26.5pp)
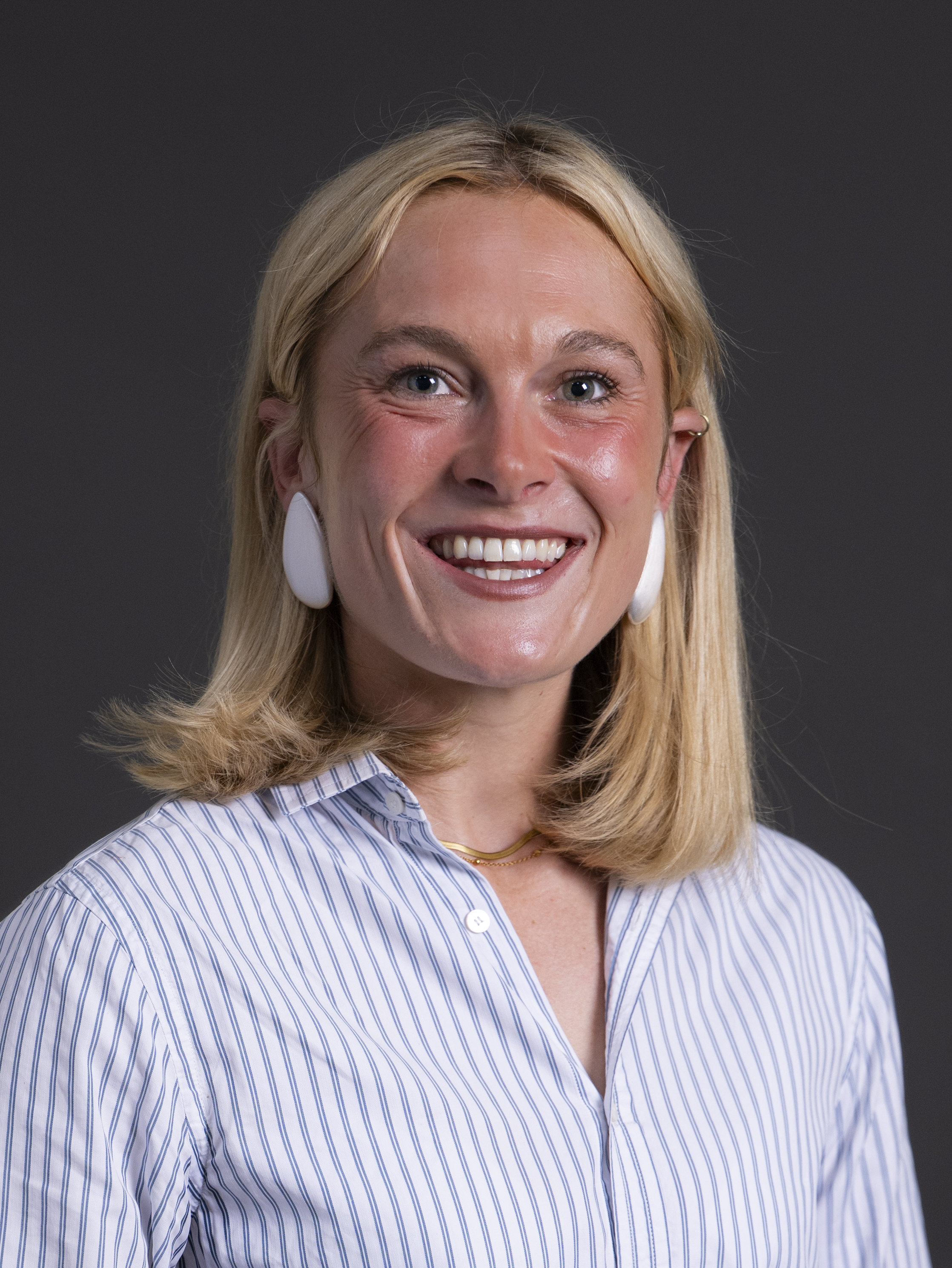

	First party	Second party	Third party
Candidate	Lara Bird	Jack Cruickshanks	Bill Reid
Party	SNP	Conservative	Reform
Popular vote	9,802	4,524	4,341
Percentage	41.1%	19.4%	18.2%
Swing	▲5.9pp	▲3.5pp	▲9.6pp
	Fourth party	Fifth party
Candidate	Heather Doran	Tanvir Ahmad
Party	Labour	Liberal Democrats
Popular vote	3,651	1,452
Percentage	15.3%	6.1%
Swing	▼18.0pp	▲1.0pp
MP before election
Stephen Gethins
SNP
Elected MP
Lara Bird
SNP

A by-election for the United Kingdom parliamentary constituency of Arbroath and Broughty Ferry was held on 18 June 2026, triggered by the resignation of incumbent Scottish National Party (SNP) MP Stephen Gethins following his election to the Scottish Parliament; the Scottish Elections (Representation and Reform) Act 2025 prohibits individuals from serving simultaneously as an MP and an MSP. It was won by SNP candidate Lara Bird, who held the seat for the party.

The vote was one of three Westminster by-elections taking place on the same day; the others being in Aberdeen South and in Makerfield.

== Background ==
As per the Scottish Elections (Representation and Reform) Act 2025, individuals are banned from holding both a seat in the Scottish Parliament and the House of Commons, and thus Gethins resigned his Westminster seat on 14 May 2026. The consequential by-election took place on 18 June 2026, the same day as Westminster parliamentary by-elections in Aberdeen South and Makerfield.

Arbroath and Broughty Ferry was created by the 2023 review of Westminster constituencies. It contains some coastal parts of Angus as well as eastern suburbs of Dundee City.

The constituency's inhabitants are 97% ethnically White, with 56% categorised as social grades A, B and C1. The average household income is £30,186, below the averages for Great Britain as a whole and for Scotland, while the home-ownership rate is 70%, higher than both the Scotland and Great Britain averages. In the 2016 referendum, 58% of those who voted in the constituency favoured remaining in the European Union.

Gethins was elected MP for North East Fife in 2015 and lost the seat in 2019. In the 2024 United Kingdom general election, he was elected in Arbroath and Broughty Ferry; it was one of only nine seats to elect an SNP candidate. Gethins won with a narrow majority of 859 votes over the Labour candidate.

== Candidates ==
On 16 May, two SNP members launched their campaigns to be selected as the party's candidate for the by-election: Lara Bird (a PhD student at King's College London) and Douglas Bruce. Bird was announced as the party's candidate four days later.

Scottish Labour selected Heather Doran, currently the only Labour councillor on the Angus Council and the party's candidate at the 2026 Scottish Parliament election for Angus South.

Jack Cruickshanks, a councillor on the Angus Council, was the Conservative candidate.

Bill Reid was announced as Reform UK's candidate on 22 May. He had previously been their candidate in Angus South at the 2026 Holyrood election.

The Scottish Liberal Democrats selected Tanvir Ahmad, the party's candidate at the 2026 Scottish Parliament election for Dundee City East.

== Result ==
2026 Arbroath and Broughty Ferry by-election
Party	Candidate	Votes	%	±%
SNP	Lara Bird	9,802	41.2	+5.9
Conservative	Jack Cruickshanks	4,524	19.0	+3.5
Reform	Bill Reid	4,341	18.3	+9.7
Labour	Heather Doran	3,651	15.4	−18.0
Liberal Democrats	Tanvir Ahmad	1,452	6.1	+1.0
Majority		5,278	21.8	+19.9
Turnout		23,770	31.3	−26.6
Rejected ballots		57	0.2	
Registered electors		75,985		
SNP hold		Swing	+1.2	

== Previous result ==
General election 2024: Arbroath and Broughty Ferry
Party	Candidate	Votes	%	±%
SNP	Stephen Gethins	15,581	35.3	−15.6
Labour	Cheryl-Ann Cruickshank	14,722	33.4	+23.2
Conservative	Richard Brooks	6,841	15.5	−14.8
Reform	Gwen Wood	3,800	8.6	N/A
Liberal Democrats	David Evans	2,249	5.1	−2.9
Alba	Ghazi Khan	693	1.6	N/A
Sovereignty	Moira Brown	231	0.5	N/A
Majority		859	1.9	
Turnout		44,278	57.9	
SNP hold		Swing	-19.4	

== See also ==
- List of United Kingdom by-elections (2024–present)
- 2026 Aberdeen South by-election (same day)
- 2026 Makerfield by-election (same day)
