= List of United Kingdom by-elections (2010–present) =

This is a list of parliamentary by-elections in the United Kingdom from 2010 to present, with the names of the incumbent and victor and their respective parties.

Where seats changed political party at the election, the result is highlighted: green for a Green Party gain, teal for a Reform UK gain, yellow for a Scottish National Party gain, blue for a Conservative Party gain, red for a Labour Party gain, orange for a Liberal Democrat gain, purple for a UKIP gain, maroon for a Workers Party gain, grey for an Independent gain, and other colours for any other gains.

65 by-elections have been held in this period, to date. The first was held in January 2011, and the most recent in October 2026.

== Process of resignation from the House of Commons ==
Where the cause of by-election is given as "resignation" or "seeks re-election", this indicates that the incumbent was appointed on his or her own request to an "office of profit under the Crown", either the Steward of the Chiltern Hundreds or the Steward of the Manor of Northstead. Accepting an office of profit under the Crown vacates the member's seat. This process is used because members of the House of Commons are not technically permitted to resign. A member who vacates their seat in this manner may stand for re-election.

== Recall petition ==
A recall petition is created by advice of the Speaker of the House of Commons if an MP is suspended from the House for at least 10 sitting days, usually a result of a criminal conviction or breaking Commons Select Committee on Standards conventions. A petition is successful if at least 10 per cent of the constituency's electorate sign the petition. Successful petitions result in the MP vacating the seat, triggering a by-election.

As of March 2024, six petitions have been held under the Act, four resulting in by-elections and one being terminated early due to the MP's resignation.

== By-elections ==
=== 2024–present Parliament ===
There have been seven by–elections so far in the 2024 parliament.

By-election	Date	Incumbent	Party	Winner	Party	Cause
Holborn and St Pancras	8 October 2026	Keir Starmer	Labour	Sagal Abdi-Wali	Labour	Resigned to "focus on international affairs" following his resignation as Prime Minister.
Clacton	13 August 2026	Nigel Farage	Reform	Nigel Farage	Reform	Resigned to trigger by-election after controversy over his party's finances.
Aberdeen South	18 June 2026	Stephen Flynn	SNP	Douglas Lumsden	Conservative	Resigned after being elected to the Scottish Parliament. Under regulations introduced by the Scottish Government in 2025, individuals may not hold a seat in both the Scottish Parliament and the House of Commons.
Arbroath and Broughty Ferry	18 June 2026	Stephen Gethins	SNP	Lara Bird	SNP	Resigned after being elected to the Scottish Parliament. Under regulations introduced by the Scottish Government in 2025, individuals may not hold a seat in both the Scottish Parliament and the House of Commons.
Makerfield	18 June 2026	Josh Simons	Labour	Andy Burnham	Labour Co-op	Resigned to allow Burnham to stand in the resulting by-election.
Gorton and Denton	26 February 2026	Andrew Gwynne	Labour Co-op (Note: Gwynne was an independent at the time he resigned from Parliament. He was elected for Labour in 2005 until he was suspended from the party in February 2025.)	Hannah Spencer	Green	Resigned due to ill health. He lost the Labour whip after a scandal involving offensive messages in a WhatsApp groupchat.
Runcorn and Helsby	1 May 2025	Mike Amesbury	Labour (Note: Amesbury was an independent at the time he resigned from Parliament. He was elected for Labour in 2017 until he was suspended from the party in October 2024.)	Sarah Pochin	Reform	Resigned after suspension from Parliament and being liable to a recall petition after a conviction for assault.

=== 2019–2024 Parliament ===
There were twenty-three by-elections in the 2019–2024 Parliament, the most by-elections in one parliament since the 1987–1992 Parliament, which had 24. Fourteen by-elections occurred in constituencies previously represented by the governing Conservatives, seven in constituencies represented by Labour, and two in constituencies represented by the SNP. The incumbent MP's party won nine by-elections, including one at Southend West, in which the other major parties did not field candidates. Labour won thirteen by-elections, gaining seven seats from the Conservatives and one from the SNP, but losing one each to the Conservatives and the Workers Party of Britain. The Liberal Democrats gained four seats from the Conservatives, while the Conservatives gained one from Labour. Five by-elections happened due to the deaths of the incumbent MPs, three of whom represented the Conservatives and two Labour.

By-election	Date	Incumbent	Party	Winner	Party	Cause
Blackpool South (Note: Gain was retained at the subsequent general election.)	2 May 2024	Scott Benton	Conservative (Note: Benton was elected as a Conservative in 2019 until he was suspended from the party in April 2023.)	Chris Webb	Labour	Resigned after being suspended from Parliament for five weeks and being subject to a recall petition for breaching lobbying rules
Rochdale (Note: Gain not retained at the subsequent general election.)	29 February 2024	Tony Lloyd	Labour	George Galloway	Workers Party	Death (leukaemia).
Kingswood	15 February 2024	Chris Skidmore	Conservative (Note: Skidmore was an independent at the time he resigned from Parliament. He was first elected as a Conservative in 2010 but resigned from the party in January 2024.)	Damien Egan	Labour	Resignation in protest of the Conservative government's bill to grant new oil and gas licences.
Wellingborough	15 February 2024	Peter Bone	Conservative (Note: Bone was an independent at the time he was removed from his seat in Parliament. He was elected as a Conservative in 2005 and served as a Conservative MP until he was suspended from the party in October 2023.)	Gen Kitchen	Labour	Successful recall petition after allegations of bullying and sexual misconduct.
Tamworth	19 October 2023	Chris Pincher	Conservative (Note: Pincher was elected as a Conservative in 2010 but was an independent at the time he resigned. He served as a Conservative MP until he was suspended from the party in July 2022.)	Sarah Edwards	Labour	Resigned after losing his appeal to his suspension due to groping allegations.
Mid Bedfordshire	19 October 2023	Nadine Dorries	Conservative	Alistair Strathern	Labour	Resigned after being omitted from Boris Johnson's resignation honours list.
Rutherglen and Hamilton West	5 October 2023	Margaret Ferrier	SNP (Note: Ferrier was an independent at the time she was removed from her seat in Parliament. She was suspended from the SNP in October 2020.)	Michael Shanks	Labour	Recall petition after breaking COVID-19 rules in 2020.
Somerton and Frome	20 July 2023	David Warburton	Conservative (Note: Warburton was elected as a Conservative in 2015 but was an independent at the time he resigned.)	Sarah Dyke	Liberal Democrats	Resigned 14 months after suspension from the Conservative Party pending an investigation.
Selby and Ainsty	20 July 2023	Nigel Adams	Conservative	Keir Mather	Labour	Resigned after being omitted from Boris Johnson's resignation honours list.
Uxbridge and South Ruislip (Note: Hold not retained at the subsequent general election.)	20 July 2023	Boris Johnson	Conservative	Steve Tuckwell	Conservative	Resigned after a parliamentary investigation found evidence he misled Parliament over Partygate and he failed to act on warnings about Chris Pincher. This led a parliamentary committee to recommend suspending him from the House for 20 days.
West Lancashire (Note: Hold retained at the subsequent general election.)	9 February 2023	Rosie Cooper	Labour	Ashley Dalton	Labour	Resigned to be chair of Mersey Care NHS Foundation Trust.
Stretford and Urmston	15 December 2022	Kate Green	Labour	Andrew Western	Labour	Resigned to be deputy mayor of Greater Manchester.
City of Chester	1 December 2022	Chris Matheson	Labour	Samantha Dixon	Labour	Resigned after suspension for serious sexual misconduct.
Tiverton and Honiton	23 June 2022	Neil Parish	Conservative (Note: Parish was elected as a Conservative in 2010 but was an independent at the time he resigned.)	Richard Foord	Liberal Democrats	Resigned after admitting to watching pornography twice in the House of Commons.
Wakefield	23 June 2022	Imran Ahmad Khan	Conservative (Note: Ahmad Khan was elected as a Conservative in 2019 but was an independent at the time he resigned. He was suspended from the party in June 2021 and expelled in April 2022.)	Simon Lightwood	Labour Co-op	Resigned after conviction of sexually assaulting a 15-year-old boy.
Birmingham Erdington	3 March 2022	Jack Dromey	Labour	Paulette Hamilton	Labour	Death (heart failure).
Southend West	3 February 2022	David Amess	Conservative	Anna Firth	Conservative (Note: As a mark of respect for the murdered MP, Labour, the Liberal Democrats, the Greens, and Reform UK all declined to contest the by-election.)	Death (murder).
North Shropshire	16 December 2021	Owen Paterson	Conservative	Helen Morgan	Liberal Democrats	Resigned after being found to have broken lobbying rules.
Old Bexley and Sidcup	2 December 2021	James Brokenshire	Conservative	Louie French	Conservative	Death (cancer).
Batley and Spen	1 July 2021	Tracy Brabin	Labour Co-op	Kim Leadbeater	Labour	Resigned after election as Mayor of West Yorkshire.
Chesham and Amersham	17 June 2021	Cheryl Gillan	Conservative	Sarah Green	Liberal Democrats	Death (cancer).
Airdrie and Shotts	13 May 2021	Neil Gray	SNP	Anum Qaisar	SNP	Resigned to contest Airdrie and Shotts in the Scottish Parliament.
Hartlepool	6 May 2021	Mike Hill	Labour	Jill Mortimer	Conservative	Resigned following allegations of sexual harassment and victimisation.

=== 2017–2019 Parliament ===
There were five by-elections in the 2017–2019 Parliament, which was the smallest number since the six-month parliament that sat between the two general elections in February and October 1974. Three were in seats held by Labour, one by the governing Conservatives and one by Sinn Féin, who do not take up their seats in the House of Commons. Four by-elections were won by the incumbent party and the Liberal Democrats won a seat from Conservatives. One by-election was a result of the death of the incumbent MP, who represented Labour. Two by-elections were the result of recall petitions via the provisions of the Recall of MPs Act 2015, the first such in the country.

At the dissolution of Parliament in 2019 there were two vacancies: Bassetlaw, caused by the resignation of Labour member John Mann, and Buckingham, caused by the resignation of Speaker John Bercow. With the proximity of the 2019 general election, by-elections were not called for these seats. The Conservatives, the party Bercow had represented before he took up the speakership, regained Buckingham and won Bassetlaw from Labour as well.

By-election	Date	Incumbent	Party	Winner	Party	Cause
Brecon and Radnorshire	1 August 2019	Chris Davies	Conservative	Jane Dodds	Liberal Democrats	Recall petition after conviction for false expenses claims.
Peterborough	6 June 2019	Fiona Onasanya	Labour (Note: Onasanya was an independent at the time of the by-election, originally elected as a Labour candidate in 2017, and expelled from the party in December 2018.)	Lisa Forbes	Labour	Recall petition after conviction for perverting the course of justice, in relation to a motoring offence.
Newport West	4 April 2019	Paul Flynn	Labour	Ruth Jones	Labour	Death (long illness).
Lewisham East	14 June 2018	Heidi Alexander	Labour	Janet Daby	Labour	Resignation on appointment as Deputy Mayor of London.
West Tyrone	3 May 2018	Barry McElduff	Sinn Féin	Órfhlaith Begley	Sinn Féin	Resignation after a joke about the Kingsmill massacre on social media.

=== 2015–2017 Parliament ===
There were ten by-elections in the 2015–2017 Parliament (with a planned by-election in Manchester Gorton cancelled when the 2017 general election was called). Seven were in seats held by Labour, and three by the governing Conservatives. Eight by-elections were won by the incumbent party: the Conservatives won a seat from Labour and lost one to the Liberal Democrats. Three by-elections happened due to the deaths of the incumbent MPs, all of whom represented Labour.

At the dissolution of Parliament in 2017, one seat was vacant: that for Manchester Gorton, caused by the death of its Labour member Gerald Kaufman. With the close proximity of the 2017 general election on 8 June, the by-election previously called for 4 May had its writ cancelled by the House of Commons. All but two of the candidates nominated for the by-election then stood at the general election, and Labour held the seat.

By-election	Date	Incumbent	Party	Winner	Party	Cause
Stoke-on-Trent Central	23 February 2017	Tristram Hunt	Labour	Gareth Snell	Labour Co-op	Resignation to take up his new role as head of the Victoria and Albert Museum.
Copeland	23 February 2017	Jamie Reed	Labour	Trudy Harrison	Conservative	Resignation to take up his new role in the nuclear power industry.
Sleaford and North Hykeham	8 December 2016	Stephen Phillips	Conservative	Caroline Johnson	Conservative	Resignation citing irreconcilable differences with the government.
Richmond Park	1 December 2016	Zac Goldsmith	Conservative	Sarah Olney	Liberal Democrats	Sought reelection as an independent in opposition to the government's policy on Heathrow Airport expansion.
Witney	20 October 2016	David Cameron	Conservative	Robert Courts	Conservative	Resignation as MP two months after resigning as Prime Minister and Leader of Conservative Party.
Batley and Spen	20 October 2016	Jo Cox	Labour	Tracy Brabin	Labour Co-op (Note: As a mark of respect for the murdered MP, the Conservatives, the Liberal Democrats, UKIP, and the Greens all declined to contest the by-election.)	Death (murder).
Tooting	16 June 2016	Sadiq Khan	Labour	Rosena Allin-Khan	Labour	Resignation upon election as Mayor of London.
Ogmore	5 May 2016	Huw Irranca-Davies	Labour	Christopher Elmore	Labour	Resignation to contest the Welsh Assembly election.
Sheffield Brightside and Hillsborough	5 May 2016	Harry Harpham	Labour	Gill Furniss	Labour	Death (cancer).
Oldham West and Royton	3 December 2015	Michael Meacher	Labour	Jim McMahon	Labour Co-op	Death (short illness).

=== 2010–2015 Parliament ===
There were 21 by-elections in the 2010–2015 Parliament. Fourteen were in constituencies held by Labour, four by the governing Conservatives, one by their coalition partners the Liberal Democrats and two by Sinn Féin, who do not take up their seats in the House of Commons. Seventeen by-elections were won by the incumbent party: Labour won a seat from the Conservatives and lost one to Respect, while UKIP gained two seats from the Conservatives after the incumbent MPs defected to the party and were re-elected. Six by-elections happened due to the deaths of the incumbent MPs, all of whom represented Labour. In all six of those by-elections, Labour retained the seat.

By-election	Date	Incumbent	Party	Winner	Party	Cause
Rochester and Strood	20 November 2014	Mark Reckless	Conservative	Mark Reckless	UKIP	Sought re-election upon change of party allegiance.
Heywood and Middleton	9 October 2014	Jim Dobbin	Labour Co-op	Liz McInnes	Labour	Death (acute alcohol toxicity with food aspiration).
Clacton	9 October 2014	Douglas Carswell	Conservative	Douglas Carswell	UKIP	Sought re-election upon change of party allegiance.
Newark	5 June 2014	Patrick Mercer	Conservative	Robert Jenrick	Conservative	Resignation after Standards Committee recommended suspension for six months for breaching paid advocacy rules.
Wythenshawe and Sale East	13 February 2014	Paul Goggins	Labour	Mike Kane	Labour	Death (stroke/haemorrhage).
South Shields	2 May 2013	David Miliband	Labour	Emma Lewell-Buck	Labour	Resignation to join International Rescue Committee.
Mid Ulster	7 March 2013	Martin McGuinness	Sinn Féin	Francie Molloy	Sinn Féin	Resignation to end 'double-jobbing' as MP and Member of the Northern Ireland Assembly.
Eastleigh	28 February 2013	Chris Huhne	Liberal Democrats	Mike Thornton	Liberal Democrats	Resignation following pleading guilty to perverting the course of justice.
Croydon North	29 November 2012	Malcolm Wicks	Labour	Steve Reed	Labour Co-op	Death (cancer).
Middlesbrough	29 November 2012	Stuart Bell	Labour	Andy McDonald	Labour	Death (cancer).
Rotherham	29 November 2012	Denis MacShane	Labour	Sarah Champion	Labour	Resignation after Standards and Privileges Committee recommended suspension for 12 months for claiming false expenses (United Kingdom parliamentary expenses scandal).
Cardiff South and Penarth	15 November 2012	Alun Michael	Labour Co-op	Stephen Doughty	Labour Co-op	Resignation to contest South Wales Police and Crime Commissioner election.
Corby	15 November 2012	Louise Mensch	Conservative	Andy Sawford	Labour Co-op	Resignation for family reasons.
Manchester Central	15 November 2012	Tony Lloyd	Labour	Lucy Powell	Labour Co-op	Resignation to contest Greater Manchester Police and Crime Commissioner election.
Bradford West	29 March 2012	Marsha Singh	Labour	George Galloway	Respect	Resignation (serious health problems).
Feltham and Heston	15 December 2011	Alan Keen	Labour Co-op	Seema Malhotra	Labour Co-op	Death (cancer).
Inverclyde	30 June 2011	David Cairns	Labour	Iain McKenzie	Labour	Death (pancreatitis).
Belfast West	9 June 2011	Gerry Adams	Sinn Féin	Paul Maskey	Sinn Féin	Resignation (to contest Louth in the Irish general election).
Leicester South	5 May 2011	Peter Soulsby	Labour	Jonathan Ashworth	Labour Co-op	Resignation (to contest the mayoralty of Leicester).
Barnsley Central	3 March 2011	Eric Illsley	Labour (Note: Eric Illsley was elected as a Labour MP from 1987 and was re-elected at every subsequent general election as a Labour candidate, but was suspended by the Labour Party shortly afterwards after being charged with fraud arising from the United Kingdom Parliamentary expenses scandal.)	Dan Jarvis	Labour	Resignation after pleading guilty to false accounting (United Kingdom Parliamentary expenses scandal).
Oldham East and Saddleworth	13 January 2011	Phil Woolas	Labour	Debbie Abrahams	Labour	Void election under the Representation of the People Act 1983; found to personally have made false statements of fact concerning a candidate.

== See also ==
- 1986 Northern Ireland by-elections
- List of by-elections to the Scottish Parliament
- List of by-elections to the Senedd
- List of United Kingdom by-elections (1979–2010)
- List of United Kingdom MPs by seniority (2010–2015)
- List of United Kingdom MPs by seniority (2015–2017)
- List of United Kingdom MPs by seniority (2017–2019)
- List of United Kingdom MPs by seniority (2019–2024)
- United Kingdom by-election records
