= 2026 Makerfield by-election =

UK parliamentary by-election

- 18 June 2026

Makerfield constituency
- Registered: 77,462
- Turnout: 58.8% (▲6.3 pp)
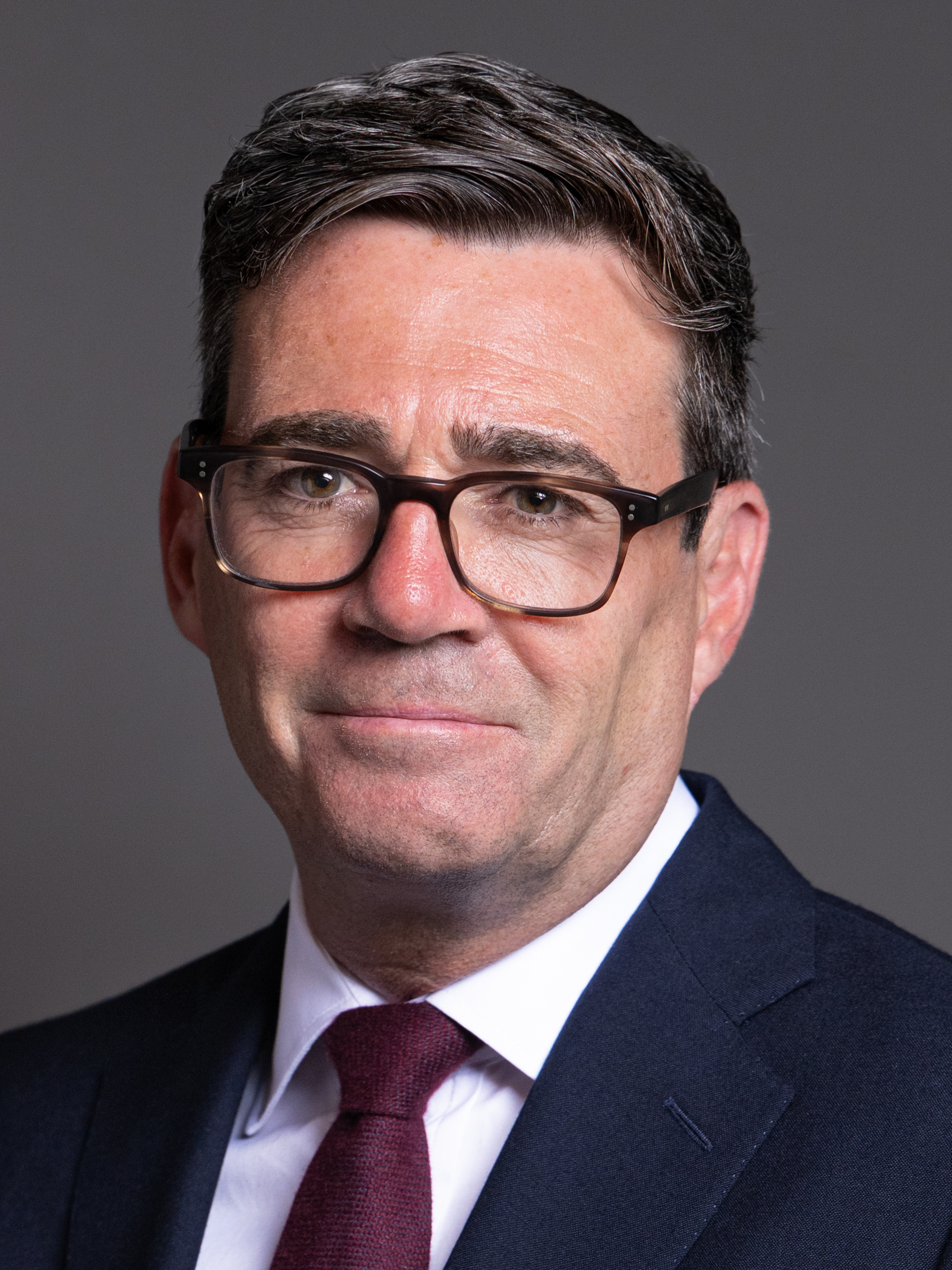

Candidate	Andy Burnham	Robert Kenyon	Rebecca Shepherd
Party	Labour Co-op	Reform	Restore
Popular vote	24,927	15,696	3,111
Percentage	54.8%	34.5%	6.8%
Swing	▲9.6 pp	▲2.7 pp	New
- Boundary of the Makerfield constituency in North West England
MP before election
Josh Simons
Labour
Elected MP
Andy Burnham
Labour Co-op

A by-election for the United Kingdom parliamentary constituency of Makerfield took place on 18 June 2026 following the resignation of Josh Simons, Member of Parliament (MP) for the Labour Party.

Amid a leadership crisis in the Labour Party, Simons resigned to allow Andy Burnham, Mayor of Greater Manchester, to stand for Parliament, in order to challenge the incumbent Prime Minister Keir Starmer for the leadership. It was the first time since the 1965 Leyton by-election that a by-election had been triggered specifically to provide a vacancy for an individual not currently in Parliament.

Burnham won the by-election with almost 25,000 votes and a majority of over 9,200 votes, exceeding expectations from opinion polls which projected that he would win by a narrow margin over Reform UK. In the event, Reform considerably underperformed compared with its showing in the 2026 local elections, while tactical squeezing of the Liberal Democrat and Green Party vote was considered to help Burnham.

Two other by-elections, in Aberdeen South and Arbroath and Broughty Ferry, took place on the same day. Following Starmer's resignation four days after the by-election, Burnham was elected unopposed to the Labour Party leadership.

== Background ==
According to a LabourList tracker, as of 14 May 2026, a total of 97 Labour MPs were calling on Prime Minister Keir Starmer to resign or announce a timetable for his resignation after the party suffered massive losses in the 2026 local elections.

Josh Simons, elected as MP for Makerfield at the 2024 general election, had previously resigned from his ministerial position as Parliamentary Secretary for the Cabinet Office on 1 March 2026. His resignation from government followed an investigation into allegations that his former think tank, Labour Together, had commissioned a private investigation into journalists' backgrounds. Although cleared of breaching the Ministerial Code, Simons described his continued presence in government as a "distraction" from the government's work.

On 14 May 2026, Simons resigned his seat in parliament in order to allow Andy Burnham to contest the by-election so as to be able to stand for the Labour leadership, in accordance with party rules that require any candidate for leader to be a member of the Parliamentary Labour Party. Simons's resignation was formalised on 18 May 2026, when he was appointed Crown Steward and Bailiff of the Chiltern Hundreds, and the writ of election was moved in the House of Commons on 19 May 2026. A notice of election was published on 20 May 2026, confirming 18 June 2026 as the date for the vote, with nominations closing on 26 May.

The National Executive Committee of the Labour Party (NEC) voted to allow Burnham to stand in the seat, and certified him as Labour's candidate for the seat. The NEC had previously blocked him from standing in the earlier 2026 Gorton and Denton by-election. If elected to Parliament, Burnham would be required to stand down as mayor of Greater Manchester, triggering a mayoral by-election. (Note: Mayors of combined authorities that hold police and crime commissioner powers are disqualified if they become a member of Parliament, triggering a mayoral by-election.)

This was the first by-election since Leyton in 1965 specifically triggered to provide a seat for a politician not currently in parliament.

=== Constituency ===
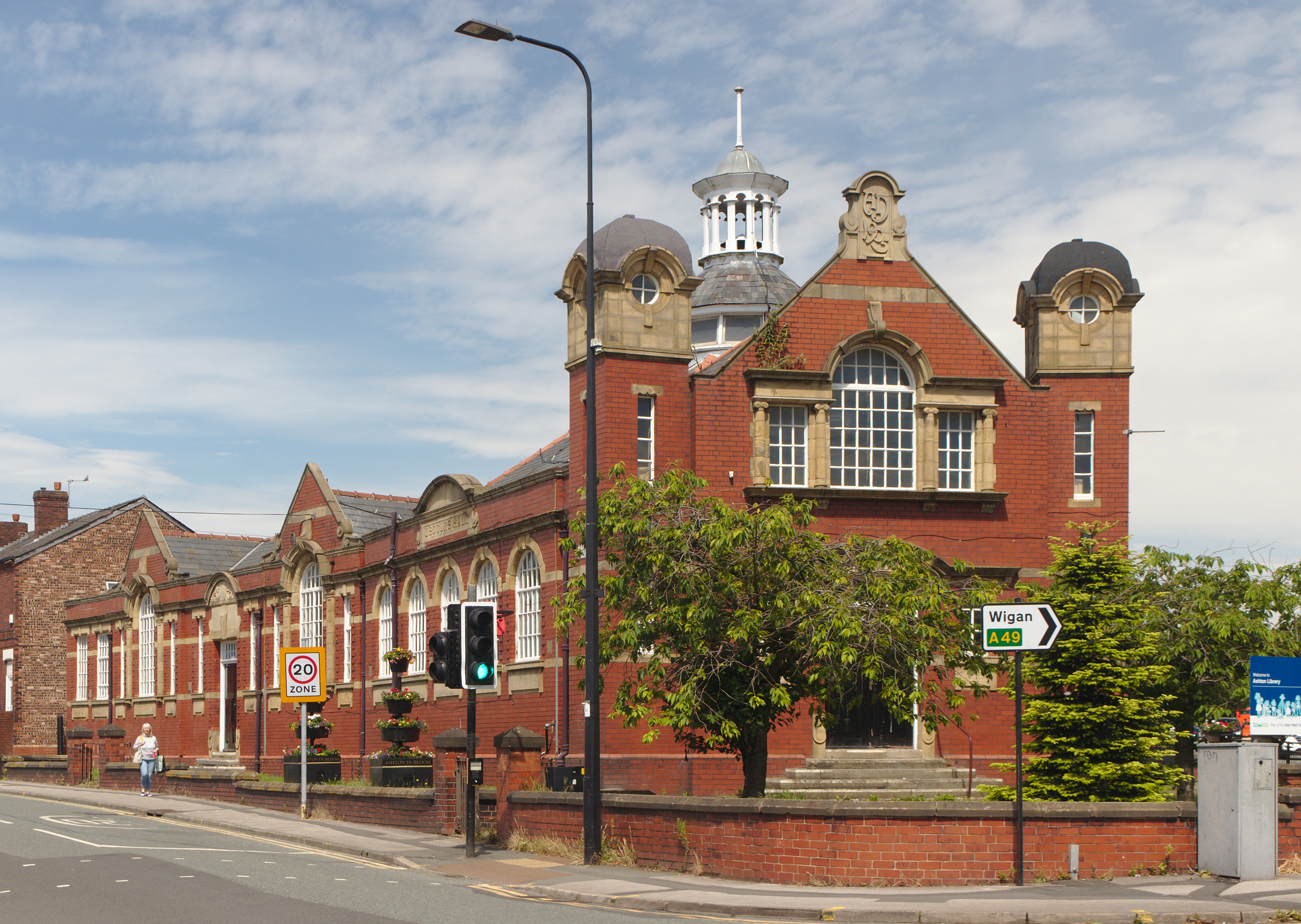
Ashton-in-Makerfield library

The Makerfield constituency contains the towns of Ashton-in-Makerfield and Hindley as well as other residential areas on the western outskirts of Greater Manchester. Considered part of the red wall of working-class areas in northern and central England that traditionally vote Labour, Makerfield has been a safe seat for the Labour Party since its creation in 1983 from parts of Ince, Wigan and Leigh. Makerfield was represented from 1987 to 2010 by one-time cabinet minister Sir Ian McCartney, then by Yvonne Fovargue until 2024. In 2024, Josh Simons held the seat with a 5,399-vote (13.4%-points) majority over Reform UK.

Ninety-seven percent of the constituency's residents are ethnically White, and 96% were born in the UK. Just over half (51%) belong to social grades A, B, and C1. The average household income is £38,810, below the average for Great Britain as a whole but slightly above that for North West England, and the home-ownership rate is 74%, against 64% nationally. In the 2016 referendum an estimated 65% of those who voted chose to leave the European Union.

=== Political context ===
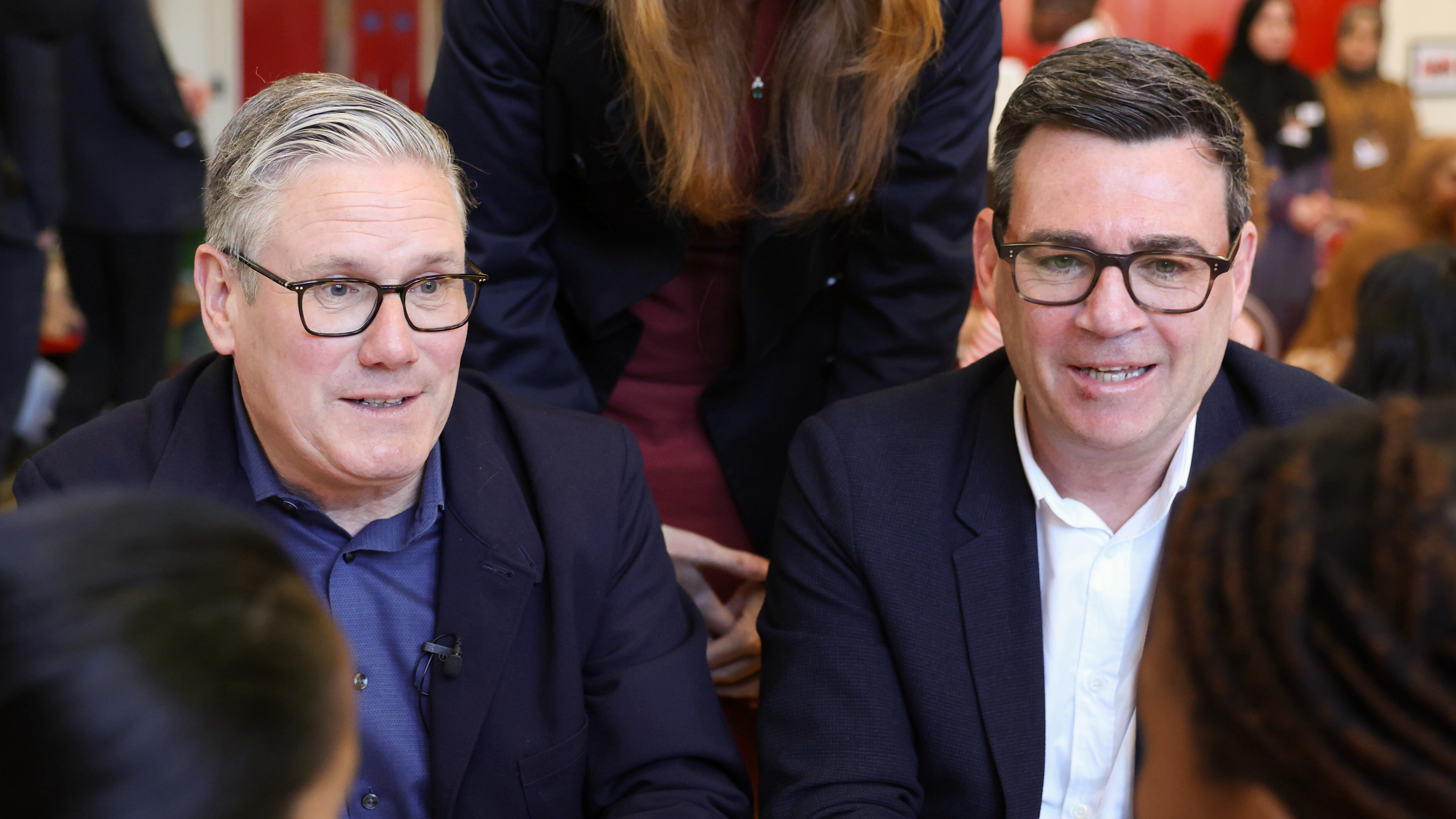
Andy Burnham (right) was the Labour candidate in the by-election. Burnham stated he would stand as a candidate against Prime Minister Keir Starmer (left) in the event of a leadership election

The Makerfield by-election took place in a significantly altered electoral landscape following the May 2026 local elections. Reform UK made large gains across Greater Manchester, while the Liberal Democrats gained control of Stockport Council. Labour suffered large losses, while the Green Party also increased its support. In the 2026 Wigan Council election, Reform UK won all eight council wards in the Makerfield constituency with around 50% of the vote. Polling analysis suggested that while no 'safe' Labour seats remained, Burnham's personal popularity in Greater Manchester would make a victory in the by-election achievable for Labour, though the party would face significant challenges from both Reform UK on the right and the Greens on the left.

Burnham's candidacy received much press attention, as he was seen as a probable challenger for the position of Labour Party leader against incumbent leader and Prime Minister Keir Starmer, opening a route to him becoming Prime Minister. The by-election was described as one of the most consequential in recent British history, with intense global media coverage, including in the constituency itself.

The by-election occurred on the same day as Westminster by-elections for two Scottish seats: Aberdeen South and Arbroath and Broughty Ferry.

== Candidates ==
=== Labour and Co-operative Party ===
Incumbent Labour MP Josh Simons resigned in order to provide a parliamentary seat for Andy Burnham, the incumbent mayor of Greater Manchester and former MP for Leigh.

As an incumbent mayor, Burnham required authorisation from the Labour Party's National Executive Committee (NEC) to stand as an MP. Burnham's previous attempt to represent Labour at the February 2026 Gorton and Denton by-election was blocked by the NEC; however, Deputy Leader of the Labour Party Lucy Powell, who serves as an officer of the NEC, and former health secretary Wes Streeting publicly supported Burnham's bid to become the Labour candidate for Makerfield. On 15 May, the NEC authorised Burnham to be considered as a candidate.

On 19 May, Burnham was confirmed as the candidate after no other names were put forward for selection by the NEC, thus bypassing the local party's voting process. He stood on behalf of both the Labour and Co-operative parties under the Labour and Co-operative Party description. Burnham was a minister in both the Blair and Brown governments, and in the shadow cabinets of Ed Miliband and Jeremy Corbyn.

=== Reform UK ===
On 19 May, Robert Kenyon, a local plumber born in the constituency, was confirmed as Reform UK's candidate. He was recently elected as the councillor for Bryn with Ashton-in-Makerfield North on Wigan Council, and ran as a Reform UK candidate in Makerfield in the 2024 general election, finishing second to Labour. He formerly served as a combat engineer in the Army Reserve within the Royal Engineers.

Shortly thereafter, Hope not Hate published a series of tweets attributed to Kenyon, which included COVID-19 conspiracies; endorsing lewd comments about presenter Carol Vorderman; and sexualised comments about female rugby players. On a separate web forum, Kenyon was also alleged to have admitted his own sexism; suggested that women make false rape accusations to access abortions "for vanity purposes"; criticised Brexit and Reform UK leader Nigel Farage; and said that Russia was "within their rights" to annex Crimea. It was also reported that Kenyon had connected on Facebook with neo-fascist campaigners such as Gary Raikes.

Reform UK said that it "fully back[ed]" Kenyon and was aware of his accounts during the party's vetting process, adding that connecting with Raikes on Facebook "does not constitute an endorsement of his views". They also stated that Kenyon did not support Russia's annexation of Crimea or their invasion of Ukraine. Reform MP Danny Kruger alleged that several of Kenyon's comments were taken out of context. After Vorderman asked for an apology, Kenyon admitted his post was "crude" but declined to apologise, stating that "no offence was meant". He also admitted making "crass" comments in the past that had been unearthed, noting they were written as a private citizen before his entry into local politics, and defended his historical posts, including a comment about Vorderman, claiming they were "jokes" from a time when he was not a public figure. The posts were criticised by a spokesperson for the Burnham campaign and by Anna Turley, the Labour Party Chair, both of whom stated that Kenyon was "not fit to represent" Makerfield; Luke Pollard, Minister of State for Defence Readiness, who stated that Kenyon was repeating "Kremlin talking points"; and Restore Britain leader Rupert Lowe, who stated Kenyon lacked "a healthy mind".

=== Conservative Party ===
It was initially reported that several figures within the Conservative Party, including Gainsborough MP and Father of the House Edward Leigh and former North East Somerset MP Jacob Rees-Mogg, were supportive of an electoral pact with Reform UK; this was later dismissed by Conservative leader Kemi Badenoch.

On 20 May, the party selected Michael Winstanley to stand as its candidate. He was born in Makerfield and had previously stood for election in the constituency in the 1997 general election. He had also stood in 2010 in Wigan, and in 2024 in Leigh and Atherton. He sat as the councillor for Orrell on Wigan Council from 2000 to 2016, serving as the Mayor of Wigan from 2010 to 2011.

=== Liberal Democrats ===
On 22 May, the Liberal Democrats introduced as their candidate Jake Austin, a councillor for Hazel Grove on Stockport Council, and candidate in the 2024 Greater Manchester mayoral election in which he placed sixth. Austin was born in the Makerfield constituency.

=== Green Party ===
On 21 May, after a hustings, the Green Party nominated local nurse Chris Kennedy as its candidate. Kennedy withdrew his candidacy later that day with the Green Party said this was due to conflict with his family's caring responsibilities. The Times later reported that it had approached him about social media comments in March 2026 in which he had referred to the 2026 Hatzola arson attack as a false flag operation, with BBC News reporting that the comments were a factor in his withdrawal. The Green Party responded, saying Kennedy apologised for the comments, which did not reflect the view of the party.

Former Green Party leader Caroline Lucas called on the party to stand down in favour of Burnham, given his support for proportional representation. The stance was also supported by another former Green leader, Jonathan Bartley, as well as former councillor Rupert Read. Baroness Jones of Moulsecoomb – one of the Greens' two Lords – disagreed, as did Hannah Spencer, who had recently been elected in Gorton and Denton.

The Greens nominated Sarah Wakefield, a charity director and a councillor in Manchester City Council, as their new candidate on 26 May. Wakefield previously attempted to stand in Gorton and Denton.

=== Restore Britain ===
Local businesswoman Rebecca Shepherd was confirmed on 18 May as Restore Britain's candidate. This was the first time the party stood a candidate for Parliament. (Note: As of May 2026, Rupert Lowe sits as a Restore Britain MP; however, he was originally elected for Reform UK and later sat as an independent before Restore was registered in February 2026.) Restore said Rebecca had spent "most of her adult life" living and working in the Wigan borough where she had run a riding school until a conflict with the local council.

=== Other candidates ===
- Libertarian Party – On 22 May, the party nominated Dan Clarke, the Libertarian candidate in the 2026 Gorton and Denton by-election. He also contested the 2024 UK general election in Runcorn and Helsby, and the subsequent by-election, as the Liberal Party candidate.
- Count Binface Party – Perennial candidate Jonathan Harvey, as his alter ego Count Binface, fought the by-election.
- John Dyer (independent)
- Climate Party – Ed Gemmell stood for the party, and was a candidate in the 2025 Buckinghamshire Council election.
- Paul Gould (independent)
- Official Monster Raving Loony Party – The party nominated their leader, Howling Laud Hope, on 19 May.
- Robert Pownall (independent) – On 25 May, Pownall, from the campaign organisation Protect The Wild, entered the race as an independent candidate. In the 2026 Scottish Parliament election he was an independent candidate in Edinburgh Central.
- Rejoin EU – The party nominated barrister Peter Ward on 23 May.

== Campaign ==
=== Labour and Co-operative Party ===
The Manchester Evening News reported that Burnham would frame his campaign around trust in politics and "economic renewal", alongside more devolution of local powers. He denied that he would campaign on a platform of rejoining the European Union "in this by-election" and stated that he would not be asking other parties to stand down for him, saying the time had come for Labour to "take [Reform] on". He named house building as one of his priorities for the area, alongside tackling anti-social behaviour by building "youth zones" in the area. He also pledged support for the area's coalfield community.

The campaign's slogan was "Andy — For Us", and a stylised cartoon image of Burnham featured on Labour's campaign material. The Manchester-based band Oasis gave Burnham permission to use their song "Some Might Say" in the campaign. Burnham's use of social media was widely noted as a strength of his campaign, with reports that he had been resharing memes and fan account content supporting his candidacy, particularly referencing his daily running routine which had become an Internet sensation.

Starmer confirmed on 21 May that he would personally campaign for Burnham in the by-election "[despite] whatever other discussions are going on". However, Politics Home reported on 3 June that several Labour MPs who remain supportive of Starmer had refused to campaign for Burnham in Makerfield, with one referring to it as "an act of [political] self-harm".

=== Reform UK ===
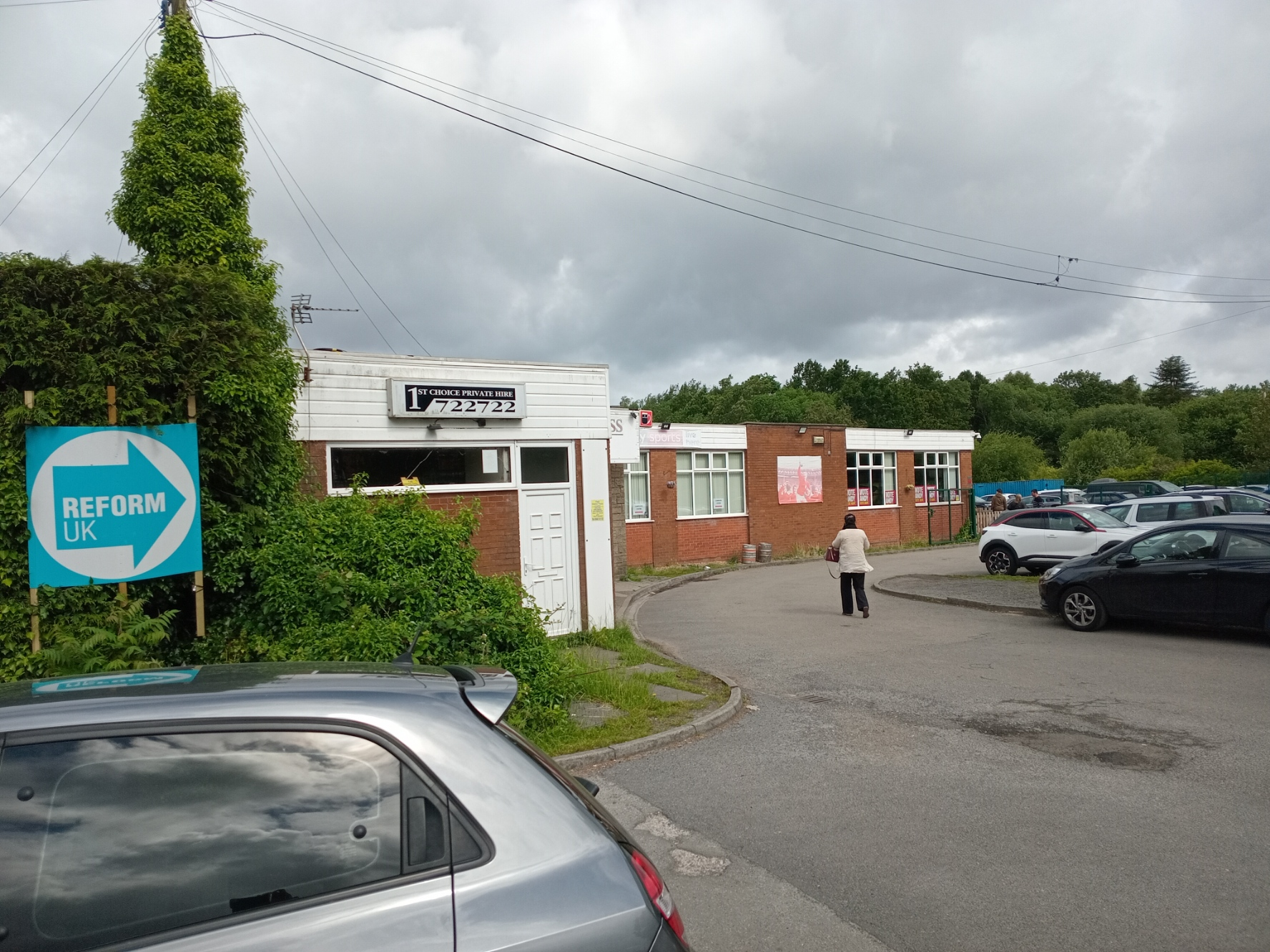
A large Reform sign next to Labour's campaign office

Makerfield would be one of Reform UK's top 10 target seats at a general election, according to journalist Stephen Bush. The party focused its early campaign to appeal to the majority of the area who "voted strongly for Brexit" in the 2016 referendum. Party leader Nigel Farage positioned the by-election as a "David versus Goliath" battle: "The Plucky Plumber [Kenyon] taking on Open Borders Burnham". Farage said that Reform's "priority" in the area would be to ease pressure on social housing, which he attributed to mass immigration. Kenyon added that, alongside concerns around social housing, his campaign priorities also included opposing greenfield development, campaigning for a new hospital, and support for struggling local pubs. Several sources noted that Reform's existing voter base in the area were largely indifferent to reports about Kenyon's historical comments on social media.

Campaign material from Reform largely targeted Burnham, including references to his historical support for the Iraq War and Jeremy Corbyn, his opposition to leaving the European Union, and accusing him of using Makerfield as a "stepping stone". Kenyon also criticised Burnham's mayoralty of Manchester, stating that "the only thing that's changed is the buses have gone yellow". Figures inside Reform reportedly later became "spooked" of the higher-than-expected support for the Restore Britain candidate Rebecca Shepherd, whom they accused of trying "to split the right of British politics", and distributed leaflets stating that Restore "can't win here".

On 12 June, Kenyon was endorsed by television personality Ant Middleton.

=== Conservative Party ===
Winstanley, the Conservative candidate, stated that he would campaign on regeneration of the high street, tackling antisocial behaviour with stronger deterrents, and easing traffic congestion by supporting the completion of the Westwood Link Road.

=== Liberal Democrats ===
The Liberal Democrat candidate Austin stated that he would campaign on the cost of living, environmental protection, and support for local businesses.

=== Green Party ===
According to Green Party leader Zack Polanski, the initial Green candidate Kennedy intended to campaign on a platform of lower bills, affordable housing, and a green economy. Polanski also stated that the Greens would use the by-election to pressure Burnham on his track record. The replacement candidate, Wakefield, stated that she would campaign locally on flood control and restoring community assets, appealing to voters to vote for "hope and joy".

Despite a spokesperson initially stating that the party was "looking forward" to the campaign, having shown they "can beat Reform" in the recent Gorton and Denton by-election, the Green Party decided early into Wakefield's candidacy to limit their campaign resources and scale back canvassing efforts. This came after several Green figures suggested limiting the party's involvement in the by-election in order to give Burnham a greater chance of winning against Kenyon, and to allow the Greens to focus on the Manchester mayoral by-election to be held on 30 July following Burnham's victory.

=== Restore Britain ===
When nominating Shepherd as its candidate on 18 May, Restore Britain said that its priorities were tackling violence against women and anti-social behaviour, opposing overdevelopment, improved support for those with special educational needs, and reinvigorating town centres. Restore Britain stated that it was the first party running in the by-election whose "thousands" of canvassers, according to the party's campaigns director Charlie Downes, had visited every property in the constituency. The Spectator reported that Restore Britain activists were involved in an altercation at the Reform UK campaign office in Makerfield, resulting in the police being called.

Shepherd's campaign was endorsed by entrepreneur Duncan Bannatyne, and by US businessman Elon Musk. The Telegraph noted Restore Britain's "highly effective social media operation" on Twitter, which is owned by Musk, as a strength of Shepherd's campaign.

=== Other candidates ===
- Robert Pownall (independent) stated he would campaign dressed as a fox, to put pressure on the government over its commitments to ban hunting with hounds.
- Libertarian Party – Clarke stated that he would campaign on personal freedom, and that he would "challenge the government [and] stand up for local constituents".
- Count Binface Party – Binface stated in his manifesto that he would cap the price of a 99 Flake at 99p, and that of a "Wigan kebab" (a butter pie in a barm cake) at £2.
- Paul Gould (independent) – He declared that he was standing in opposition to the proposed Peak Cluster carbon capture pipeline and its potential impact on the Wirral.

== Debates ==
Three debates were held between candidates.

Date	Location	Host	Candidates							
P Present A Absent I Invited S Statements only N Not invited			Austin (LibDem)	Burnham (Labour)	Clarke (LPUK)	Gould (Ind)	Kenyon (Reform)	Shepherd (Restore)	Wakefield (Green)	Winstanley (Cons)
4 June	Ashton-in-Makerfield	BBC Question Time	P	P	N	N	P	N	P	P
8 June	MediaCityUK	BBC North West	P	P	N	N	P	N	P	P
10 June (Note: This debate was primarily between the five main parties; however, Clarke and Gould were "given a chance to speak" without being part of the main debate. Shepherd was reportedly invited to the debate but did not respond to the MEN invitation.)	Winstanley College	Manchester Evening News	P	P	S	S	P	A	P	P

The 4 June edition of the BBC's Question Time was a Makerfield by-election special, with Austin, Burnham, Kenyon, Wakefield and Winstanley as panellists. In response to criticism from Restore Britain that they were not invited to the debate, the BBC stated that invitations to parties were based "on their past and current electoral support ... as is always the case".

== Opinion polling ==
Date(s) conducted	Pollster	Client	Sample size	Labour	Reform	Cons	LD	Green	Restore	Others	Lead
18 Jun 2026	2026 by-election			54.8%	34.5%	2.2%	0.4%	0.7%	6.8%	0.6% CBP 0.2% OMRLP 0.1% Dyer (Ind) 0.1% REU 0.1% LPUK 0.04% Clm 0.04% Pownall (Ind) 0.04% Gould (Ind) 0.02%	20.3
2–12 Jun 2026	Convergent Opinion	The Sunday Times	525	49%	37%	3%	1%	5%	5%	1%	12
28 May – 12 Jun 2026	More In Common		515	45%	40%	2%	1%	3%	8%	1%	5
3–11 Jun 2026	Opinium	Forward Democracy	543	46%	41%	3%	1%	2%	7%	1%	5
26 May – 1 Jun 2026	Survation		518	49%	39%	1%	1%	2%	8%	1%	10
18–22 May 2026	Survation	Election Data Ltd	504 (Note: Excluding those who would not vote or answered "Don't know", there were 369 respondents who gave an answer.)	43%	40%	2%	4%	3%	7%	1%	3
4 Jul 2024	2024 general election			45.2%	31.8%	10.9%	6.8%	4.4%	–	0.9% ED 0.9%	13.4

== Result ==
2026 Makerfield by-election
Party	Candidate	Votes	%	±%
Labour Co-op	Andy Burnham	24,927	54.8	+9.6
Reform	Robert Kenyon	15,696	34.5	+2.7
Restore	Rebecca Shepherd	3,111	6.8	New
Conservative	Michael Winstanley	997	2.2	−8.7
Green	Sarah Wakefield	308	0.7	−3.7
Liberal Democrats	Jake Austin	163	0.4	−6.4
Binface	Count Binface	95	0.2	New
Monster Raving Loony	Howling Laud Hope	45	0.1	New
Independent	John Dyer	37	0.1	New
Rejoin EU (Note: Using the description Rejoin EU Bring In PR)	Peter Ward	35	0.1	New
Libertarian	Dan Clarke	18	0.04	New
Climate	Ed Gemmell	18	0.04	New
Independent	Robert Pownall	18	0.04	New
Independent	Paul Gould	8	0.02	New
Rejected ballots		48	0.1	
Majority		9,231	20.3	+6.9
Turnout		45,524	58.8	+6.3
Registered electors		77,462		
Labour Co-op hold		Swing	+3.5	

== Previous result ==
General election 2024: Makerfield
Party	Candidate	Votes	%	±%
Labour	Josh Simons	18,202	45.2	−0.1
Reform	Robert Kenyon	12,803	31.8	+18.7
Conservative	Simon Finkelstein	4,379	10.9	−23.4
Liberal Democrats	John Skipworth	2,735	6.8	+2.0
Green	Maria Deery	1,776	4.4	+1.8
English Democrat	Thomas Bryer	368	0.9	N/A
Majority		5,399	13.4	+2.4
Turnout		40,263	52.5	−7.2
Registered electors		76,641		
Labour hold		Swing	−9.4	

== Analysis ==
Burnham won 54.8% of the vote, increasing Labour's majority from 5,399 at the 2024 general election, to 9,231. The turnout, 58.8%, was the highest for a parliamentary by-election since Brecon and Radnorshire in 2019, and the first time since Greenwich in 1987 that a by-election turnout for a constituency was higher than that of the preceding general election, with the increase of 6.2 percentage points being the third highest from a preceding general election since 1945. It was the first time since Hartlepool in 2021 that a by-election resulted in a swing towards the governing party and the first time since Beckenham in 1997 that it happened under a Labour government. Although Reform UK was defeated, it achieved its highest ever vote total, beating that in the Runcorn and Helsby by-election in 2025, and its second highest vote share, after that in the same by-election. The candidates for three main parties, the Conservatives, Liberal Democrats and Greens all lost their deposits. The Liberal Democrats scored the lowest vote share for a major party in any by-election, the party's share in the 2014 Rochester and Strood by-election being the previous lowest. The Conservative party scored its second-lowest ever by-election vote share, its lowest being in the previous by-election, Gorton and Denton in 2026.

== Aftermath ==
Burnham's victory returned him to the House of Commons for the first time since 2017 and made him eligible to stand in any Labour leadership contest. On 22 June Starmer announced that he would resign as leader of the Labour Party, remaining as prime minister until the election of a new leader. Burnham was sworn in as an MP later the same day and announced his candidacy for the leadership election.

The result also created a vacancy in the Greater Manchester mayoralty. Burnham resigned as mayor on 19 June 2026, as the office-holder cannot also serve as an MP because the mayor holds police and crime commissioner powers. Burnham's replacement Bev Craig was elected in a by-election on 30 July 2026.

=== Reactions ===
In his victory speech, Burnham said Labour had a "final chance to change" and described the result as a possible turning point in British politics. He called for a "Makerfield test" at the heart of national politics, under which policies would be judged by whether they worked for communities and delivered greater fairness to places he said had been neglected by Westminster. He also said he would prioritise local interests over party advantage, focus on practical problem-solving, seek to heal divisions after the campaign, and support greater powers for the North.

Prime Minister Keir Starmer congratulated Burnham and said the result showed that the tide was turning on Reform UK, which he said had "probably" reached the peak of its support. He also said he would stand in any Labour leadership contest and would not "walk away". The result increased pressure on Starmer within the Labour Party, with some Labour figures calling for an orderly leadership transition. In Prime Minister's Questions after the by-election, Starmer also sarcastically congratulated the Conservative Party "because they got 2.2% of the vote in Makerfield, just edging past Count Binface".

Reform UK leader Nigel Farage expressed disappointment with the result, saying Reform had been "hoist with our own petard" because Burnham's anti-Starmer message had helped him consolidate support. Farage also urged voters who had backed Restore Britain to support Reform in future elections. Conservative Party leader Kemi Badenoch contrasted the Makerfield by-election with the concurrent by-election in Aberdeen South, which saw the Conservatives gain a previously Scottish National Party seat, their first by-election gain in Scotland since 1967. Badenoch said "the Aberdeen South by-election was about thousands of jobs all over the country", with a particular emphasis on the oil and gas sector, whilst the Makerfield by-election "was about one man's job".

Political scientist Rob Ford described the by-election as part of an emerging trend of anti-Reform tactical voting in by-elections. Stephen Bush wrote that tactical voting, and the polarising nature of Reform UK, is "a serious impediment to Farage's prime ministerial ambitions", noting that Makerfield would be a top 10 target seat for Reform UK at a general election. Broadcaster Andrew Neil described a "Burnham agenda", but said there are "no policies" and that despite Labour believing they found an "antidote" to Reform in Andy Burnham, he "can't offer anything any more different" than Prime Minister Starmer.

The Wall Street Journal stated that Burnham could "sweep into Downing Street" with a plurality in a by-election in a constituency of just 77,000 voters – a political situation unprecedented in modern Britain.

== See also ==
- 1963 Kinross and Western Perthshire by-election – by-election contested and won by sitting Prime Minister Alec Douglas-Home, who renounced his peerage to become an MP
- 1965 Nuneaton by-election – MP Frank Bowles accepted a peerage to enable Frank Cousins to enter the Commons (same date as the by-election in Leyton and similar circumstances)
- List of United Kingdom by-elections (2024–present)
- Midlothian campaign – comeback campaign undertaken by William Ewart Gladstone in 1878–1880, leading to his election as MP for Midlothian in the 1880 general election and return to office as Prime Minister
- Ministerial by-election – Former type of by-election in Westminster systems
