= List of United Kingdom MPs by seniority (2015–2017) =

This is the list of United Kingdom MPs by seniority, 2015–2017. The Members of Parliament (MPs) are ranked by the beginning of their terms in office, in the House of Commons.

The House of Commons of the 56th Parliament of the United Kingdom was elected on 7 May 2015 and first met on 18 May 2015. Under the Fixed-term Parliaments Act 2011 (as amended) the next general election was scheduled to be on 7 May 2020. An early election or one delayed by up to two months were possible in certain circumstances. In the event an early general election was authorised, by a two-thirds vote of the House of Commons, with the election being arranged for 8 June 2017. The formal dissolution of Parliament takes place twenty-five working days before the polling day to elect the new Parliament.

The constituencies and party affiliations listed reflect those during the 56th Parliament. Seats and party affiliations for other Parliaments will be different for certain members.

This article describes the criteria for seniority in the House of Commons, as set out in Father of the House: a House of Commons background paper.

== Seniority criteria ==
The criteria for seniority, used in this article, are derived from the way that the Father of the House is selected. They are not laid down in Standing Orders but arise from the customary practice of the House of Commons.

The modern custom is that the Father of the House is the MP who has the longest continuous service. If two or more members were first elected in the same General Election (or at by-elections held on the same day), then priority is given to the one who was sworn in first. The order of swearing in is recorded in Hansard, the official record of proceedings.

When a member has had broken service, that does not affect his or her seniority (for the purpose of qualifying as the Father of the House) which is based on the latest period of continuous service.

The Sinn Féin members, who abstain from taking their seats at Westminster, have never been sworn in. They are ranked (in this list) after all other members who have taken their seats. Between themselves they are ranked by the first date of election, for the current period of continuous service. If that criterion is equal, then they are ranked by alphabetical order of surnames.

In the House of Commons, the sole mandatory duty of the Father of the House is to preside over the election of a new Speaker whenever that office becomes vacant. The relevant Standing Order does not refer to this member by the title "Father of the House", referring instead to the longest-serving member of the House present who is not a Minister of the Crown (meaning that if the Father is absent or a government minister, the next person in line presides).

== Summary of members elected by party ==
Affiliation	Members	
Affiliation	At 2015 election	At dissolution
Conservative	330	330
Labour	232	229
SNP	56	54
Liberal Democrats	8	9
DUP	8	8
Independent	1	5
Sinn Féin	4	4
Plaid Cymru	3	3
SDLP	3	3
UUP	2	2
Green	1	1
Speaker	1	1
UKIP	1	0
Vacant seats	0	1
Total	650	650
Government majority	16	17

Notes

- See here for a full list of changes during the fifty-sixth Parliament.
- In addition to the parties listed in the table above, the Co-operative Party was also represented in the House of Commons by Labour MPs sitting with the Labour Co-operative designation. The number of these MPs was 24 after the general election, and was 28 at dissolution.
- The actual government majority was calculated as Conservative MPs less all other parties. This calculation excluded the Speaker, Deputy Speakers (two Labour and one Conservative) and Sinn Féin (who followed a policy of abstentionism).

== List of Members of Parliament by seniority ==
This article assigns a numerical rank to each of the members elected in the 2015 general election and subsequent by-elections, except for those who were elected but never sworn in, who are displayed at the bottom without a number. Members named in italics and shaded in pink ceased to be MPs during the course of the parliament.

Rank	Member	Party	Constituency 2015	Elected	Date of birth	Notes
45th Parliament (elected: 18 June 1970, first met: 29 June 1970, dissolved: 8 February 1974)
001	The Rt Hon. Sir Gerald Kaufman	Lab	Manchester Gorton	18 June 1970	21/06/1930	Father of the House until his death on 27 February 2017.
002	The Rt Hon. Kenneth Clarke	C	Rushcliffe	18 June 1970	02/07/1940	Father of the House 27 February 2017 until 12 December 2019. Former Chancellor of the Exchequer and Lord Chancellor among other Government and opposition briefs.
003	The Rt Hon. Michael Meacher	Lab	Oldham West and Royton	18 June 1970	04/11/1939	Died 21 October 2015.
004	Dennis Skinner	Lab	Bolsover	18 June 1970	11/02/1932	Failed to be reelected in the 2019 general election.
47th Parliament (elected: 10 October 1974, first met: 22 October 1974, dissolved: 7 April 1979)
005	Sir Peter Bottomley	C	Worthing West	26 June 1975	30/07/1944	Father of the house since 13 December 2019.
006	Geoffrey Robinson	Lab	Coventry North West	4 March 1976	25/05/1938	Stood down at the 2019 general election.
007	The Rt Hon. Sir Alan Haselhurst	C	Saffron Walden	7 July 1977	23/06/1937	Previously served 1970–1974, stood down at the 2017 general election, as the oldest Conservative MP during his last Parliament, at the age of 80.
48th Parliament (elected: 3 May 1979, first met: 9 May 1979, dissolved: 13 May 1983)
008	David Winnick	Lab	Walsall North	3 May 1979	26/06/1933	Previously served 1966–1970; defeated in 2017.
009	Barry Sheerman	Lab	Huddersfield	3 May 1979	17/08/1940	
010	The Rt Hon. Frank Field	Lab	Birkenhead	3 May 1979	16/07/1942	Failed to be reelected in the 2019 general election.
011	The Rt Hon. Harriet Harman	Lab	Camberwell and Peckham	28 Oct 1982	30/07/1950	Acting Lab Leader and Leader of the Opposition 8 May 2015 – 12 September 2015.
49th Parliament (elected: 9 June 1983, first met: 15 June 1983, dissolved: 18 May 1987)
012	The Rt Hon. Sir Kevin Barron	Lab	Rother Valley	9 June 1983	26/10/1946	Stood down at the 2019 general election.
013	Sir Edward Leigh	C	Gainsborough	9 June 1983	20/07/1950	
014	The Rt Hon. Nick Brown	Lab	Newcastle upon Tyne East	9 June 1983	13/06/1950	Chief Whip, Lab 6 October 2016 – present.
015	The Rt Hon. Jeremy Corbyn	Lab	Islington North	9 June 1983	26/05/1949	Labour Party Leader and Leader of the Opposition 12 September 2015 – 4 April 2020
016	Sir David Amess	C	Southend West	9 June 1983	26/03/1952	Murdered in office in 2021
017	Sir Roger Gale	C	North Thanet	9 June 1983	20/08/1943	
018	The Rt Hon. Peter Lilley	C	Hitchin and Harpenden	9 June 1983	23/08/1943	Stood down at the 2017 general election.
019	The Rt Hon. Sir Nicholas Soames	C	Mid Sussex	9 June 1983	12/02/1948	Stood down at the 2019 general election.
020	The Rt Hon. Dame Margaret Beckett	Lab	Derby South	9 June 1983	15/01/1943	Previously served 1974–1979.
021	Sir Bill Cash	C	Stone	3 June 1984	10/05/1940	
022	The Rt Hon. Ann Clwyd	Lab	Cynon Valley	3 June 1984	21/03/1937	Stood down at the 2019 general election.
023	The Rt Hon. Sir Patrick McLoughlin	C	Derbyshire Dales	8 May 1986	30/11/1957	Chairman of the Conservative Party & Chancellor of the Duchy of Lancaster
024	The Rt Hon. George Howarth	Lab	Knowsley	13 Nov 1986	29/06/1949	
50th Parliament (elected: 11 June 1987, first met: 17 June 1987, dissolved: 16 March 1992)
025	The Rt Hon. John Redwood	C	Wokingham	11 June 1987	15/06/1951	Leadership challenger to John Major in 1995
026	Ronnie Campbell	Lab	Blyth Valley	11 June 1987	14/08/1943	Stood down at the 2019 general election.
027	The Rt Hon. David Davis	C	Haltemprice and Howden	11 June 1987	23/12/1948	
028	Sir Alan Meale	Lab	Mansfield	11 June 1987	31/07/1949	Unseated at the 2017 general election.
029	David Tredinnick	C	Bosworth	11 June 1987	19/01/1950	Stood down at the 2019 general election.
030	The Rt Hon. Andrew Smith	Lab	Oxford East	11 June 1987	01/02/1951	Stood down at the 2017 general election.
031	The Rt Hon. Sir Simon Burns	C	Chelmsford	11 June 1987	06/09/1952	Stood down at the 2017 general election.
032	The Rt Hon. Keith Vaz	Lab	Leicester East	11 June 1987	26/11/1956	Former Chair of the Home Affairs Select Committee
033	Paul Flynn	Lab	Newport West	11 June 1987	09/02/1935	Died in office in 2019
034	Graham Allen	Lab	Nottingham North	11 June 1987	11/01/1953	Stood down at the 2017 general election.
035	Sir Julian Brazier	C	Canterbury	11 June 1987	24/07/1953	Unseated at the 2017 general election.
036	The Rt Hon. Diane Abbott	Lab	Hackney North and Stoke Newington	11 June 1987	27/09/1953	Shadow Home Secretary
037	Kate Hoey	Lab	Vauxhall	15 June 1989	21/06/1946	Stood down at the 2019 general election.
51st Parliament (elected: 9 April 1992, first met: 27 April 1992, dissolved: 8 April 1997)
038	Jim Cunningham	Lab	Coventry South	9 April 1992	04/02/1941	Stood down at the 2019 general election.
039	Richard Burden	Lab	Birmingham, Northfield	9 April 1992	01/09/1954	Unseated at the 2017 general election.
040	The Rt Hon. Sir Edward Garnier	C	Harborough	9 April 1992	26/10/1952	Stood down at the 2017 general election.
041	The Rt Hon. Liam Fox	C	North Somerset	9 April 1992	22/09/1961	Secretary of State for International Trade & President of the Board of Trade; former Secretary of State for Defence
042	The Rt Hon. David Lidington	C	Aylesbury	9 April 1992	30/06/1956	Leader of the House of Commons & Lord President of the Council
043	The Rt Hon. Sir Oliver Heald	C	North East Hertfordshire	9 April 1992	15/12/1954	
044	Geoffrey Clifton-Brown	C	The Cotswolds	9 April 1992	23/03/1953	
045	The Rt Hon. David Hanson	Lab	Delyn	9 April 1992	05/07/1957	
046	Gary Streeter	C	South West Devon	9 April 1992	02/10/1955	
047	Michael Fabricant	C	Lichfield	9 April 1992	12/06/1950	
048	Clive Betts	Lab	Sheffield South East	9 April 1992	13/01/1950	
049	Ann Coffey	Lab	Stockport	9 April 1992	31/08/1946	
050	The Rt Hon. Sir Alan Duncan	C	Rutland and Melton	9 April 1992	31/03/1957	
051	Jim Dowd	Lab	Lewisham West and Penge	9 April 1992	05/03/1951	
052	Sir Paul Beresford	C	Mole Valley	9 April 1992	06/04/1946	
053	The Rt Hon. Iain Duncan Smith	C	Chingford and Woodford Green	9 April 1992	09/04/1954	Former Secretary of State for Work and Pensions & Leader of the Opposition
054	Mike Gapes	Lab	Ilford South	9 April 1992	04/09/1952	Unseated at the 2019 general election.
055	Nigel Evans	C	Ribble Valley	9 April 1992	10/11/1957	Former First Deputy Chair of Ways and Means
056	The Rt Hon. Cheryl Gillan	C	Chesham and Amersham	9 April 1992	21/04/1952	Died in office in 2021.
057	The Hon. Bernard Jenkin	C	Harwich and North Essex	9 April 1992	09/04/1959	
058	The Rt Hon. Sir Eric Pickles	C	Brentwood and Ongar	9 April 1992	20/04/1952	Former Secretary of State for Communities and Local Government
059	Angela Eagle	Lab	Wallasey	9 April 1992	17/02/1961	Held various Shadow Cabinet positions prior to an unsuccessful challenge for the Labour Leadership
060	The Rt Hon. John Whittingdale	C	Maldon	9 April 1992	16/10/1959	Former Secretary of State for Culture, Media and Sport
061	The Rt Hon. John Spellar	Lab	Warley	9 April 1992	05/08/1947	Previously served 1982–1983.
062	Roger Godsiff	Lab	Birmingham Hall Green	9 April 1992	28/06/1946	Unseated at the 2019 general election.
063	The Rt Hon. Dame Margaret Hodge	Lab	Barking	9 June 1994	08/09/1944	Former Chair of the Public Accounts Committee
064	The Rt Hon. Stephen Timms	Lab	East Ham	9 June 1994	29/07/1955	
065	Jon Trickett	Lab	Hemsworth	1 February 1996	02/07/1950	Shadow Lord President of the Council
52nd Parliament (elected: 1 May 1997, first met: 7 May 1997, dissolved: 14 May 2001)
066	The Rt Hon. Keith Simpson	C	Broadland	1 May 1997	29/03/1949	Stood down at the 2019 general election.
067	The Rt Hon. Julian Lewis	C	New Forest East	1 May 1997	26/09/1951	Chair of the Defence Select Committee
068	The Rt Hon. Owen Paterson	C	North Shropshire	1 May 1997	24/06/1956	Former Secretary of State for Environment, Food and Rural Affairs & Secretary of State for Northern Ireland
069	Laurence Robertson	C	Tewkesbury	1 May 1997	29/03/1958	
070	Robert Syms	C	Poole	1 May 1997	15/08/1956	
071	The Rt Hon. Ben Bradshaw	Lab	Exeter	1 May 1997	30/08/1960	Former Secretary of State for Culture, Media and Sport
072	Helen Jones	Lab	Warrington North	1 May 1997	24/12/1954	Stood down at the 2019 general election.
073	Jim Fitzpatrick	Lab	Poplar and Limehouse	1 May 1997	04/04/1952	Stood down at the 2019 general election.
074	The Rt Hon. Sir Jeffrey Donaldson	DUP	Lagan Valley	1 May 1997	07/12/1962	
075	The Rt Hon. John McDonnell	Lab	Hayes and Harlington	1 May 1997	08/09/1951	Shadow Chancellor of the Exchequer
076	Gareth Thomas	Lab	Harrow West	1 May 1997	15/07/1967	
077	Eleanor Laing	C	Epping Forest	1 May 1997	01/02/1958	Deputy Speaker:1st Dep. Ch., Ways and Means
078	Stephen Pound	Lab	Ealing North	1 May 1997	03/07/1948	Stood down at the 2019 general election.
079	The Rt Hon. Lindsay Hoyle	Lab	Chorley	1 May 1997	10/06/1957	Deputy Speaker: Chairman, Ways and Means
080	The Rt Hon. John Healey	Lab	Wentworth and Dearne	1 May 1997	13/02/1960	Shadow Secretary of State for Housing
081	Louise Ellman	Lab	Liverpool Riverside	1 May 1997	14/11/1945	Stood down at the 2019 general election.
082	The Rt Hon. Philip Hammond	C	Runnymede and Weybridge	1 May 1997	04/12/1955	Chancellor of the Exchequer
083	Tim Loughton	C	East Worthing and Shoreham	1 May 1997	30/05/1962	
084	The Rt Hon. Tom Brake	LD	Carshalton and Wallington	1 May 1997	06/05/1962	Liberal Democrat Chief Whip & Liberal Democrat Foreign Affairs Spokesman
085	The Rt Hon. Fiona Mactaggart	Lab	Slough	1 May 1997	12/09/1953	Stood down at the 2017 general election.
086	Kelvin Hopkins	Lab	Luton North	1 May 1997	22/08/1941	Stood down at the 2019 general election.
087	The Rt Hon. Theresa May	C	Maidenhead	1 May 1997	01/10/1956	Leader of the Conservatives 11 July 2016 & Prime Minister 13 July 2016 – 24 July 2019.
088	Graham Brady	C	Altrincham and Sale West	1 May 1997	20/05/1967	
089	The Rt Hon. John Bercow	Spe	Buckingham	1 May 1997	19/01/1963	Speaker
090	The Rt Hon. Nick Gibb	C	Bognor Regis and Littlehampton	1 May 1997	03/09/1960	
091	Stephen Hepburn	Lab	Jarrow	1 May 1997	06/12/1959	
092	Alan Whitehead	Lab	Southampton Test	1 May 1997	15/09/1950	
093	The Rt Hon. Gisela Stuart	Lab	Birmingham Edgbaston	1 May 1997	26/11/1955	
094	The Rt Hon. Alan Johnson	Lab	Kingston upon Hull West and Hessle	1 May 1997	17/05/1950	
095	Barry Gardiner	Lab	Brent North	1 May 1997	10/03/1957	
096	The Rt Hon. Caroline Flint	Lab	Don Valley	1 May 1997	20/09/1961	
097	The Rt Hon. Andrew Tyrie	C	Chichester	1 May 1997	15/01/1957	
098	The Rt Hon. Dominic Grieve	C	Beaconsfield	1 May 1997	24/05/1956	
099	Sir David Crausby	Lab	Bolton North East	1 May 1997	17/06/1946	
100	The Rt Hon. Sir Desmond Swayne	C	New Forest West	1 May 1997	20/08/1956	
101	Fabian Hamilton	Lab	Leeds North East	1 May 1997	12/04/1955	
102	The Rt Hon. Dame Caroline Spelman	C	Meriden	1 May 1997	04/05/1958	
103	Sir Gerald Howarth	C	Aldershot	1 May 1997	12/09/1947	Previously served 1983–1992.
104	The Rt Hon. Sir Michael Fallon	C	Sevenoaks	1 May 1997	14/05/1952	Previously served 1983–1992.
105	The Rt Hon. Damian Green	C	Ashford	1 May 1997	17/01/1956	
106	James Gray	C	North Wiltshire	1 May 1997	07/11/1954	
107	The Rt Hon. Alan Campbell	Lab	Tynemouth	1 May 1997	08/07/1957	
108	Maria Eagle	Lab	Garston and Halewood	1 May 1997	17/02/1961	
109	The Rt Hon. Dame Rosie Winterton	Lab	Doncaster Central	1 May 1997	10/08/1958	Chief Whip, Lab –6 October 2016
110	Ivan Lewis	Lab	Bury South	1 May 1997	04/03/1967	
111	Gordon Marsden	Lab	Blackpool South	1 May 1997	28/11/1953	
112	Clive Efford	Lab	Eltham	1 May 1997	10/07/1958	
113	Karen Buck	Lab	Westminster North	1 May 1997	30/08/1958	
114	Steve McCabe	Lab	Birmingham Selly Oak	1 May 1997	04/08/1955	
115	Graham Stringer	Lab	Blackley and Broughton	1 May 1997	17/02/1950	
116	The Rt Hon. John Hayes	C	South Holland and The Deepings	1 May 1997	23/06/1958	
117	The Rt Hon. Sir Oliver Letwin	C	West Dorset	1 May 1997	19/05/1956	
118	The Rt Hon. Yvette Cooper	Lab	Normanton, Pontefract and Castleford	1 May 1997	20/03/1969	
119	Vernon Coaker	Lab	Gedling	1 May 1997	17/06/1953	
120	Crispin Blunt	C	Reigate	1 May 1997	15/07/1960	
121	Derek Twigg	Lab	Halton	1 May 1997	09/07/1959	
122	Siobhain McDonagh	Lab	Mitcham and Morden	1 May 1997	20/02/1960	
123	Christopher Chope	C	Christchurch	1 May 1997	19/05/1947	Previously served 1983–1992.
124	The Rt Hon. Hilary Benn	Lab	Leeds Central	10 June 1999	26/11/1953	
125	The Rt Hon. David Lammy	Lab	Tottenham	22 June 2000	19/07/1972	
126	Mark Hendrick	Lab	Preston	23 November 2000	02/11/1958	
127	Adrian Bailey	Lab	West Bromwich West	23 November 2000	11/12/1945	
53rd Parliament (elected: 7 June 2001, first met: 13 June 2001, dissolved: 11 April 2005)
128	The Rt Hon. Sir Greg Knight	C	East Yorkshire	7 June 2001	04/04/1949	Previously served 1983–1997.
129	Richard Bacon	C	South Norfolk	7 June 2001	03/12/1962	
130	The Rt Hon. Nigel Dodds	DUP	Belfast North	7 June 2001	20/08/1958	Parliamentary group leader: DUP
131	Gregory Campbell	DUP	East Londonderry	7 June 2001	15/02/1953	
132	Bill Wiggin	C	North Herefordshire	7 June 2001	04/06/1966	
133	Andrew Rosindell	C	Romford	7 June 2001	17/03/1966	
134	The Rt Hon. David Cameron	C	Witney	7 June 2001	09/10/1966	Leader, C –11 July 2016. Prime Minister –13 July 2016 | Resigned seat on 12 September 2016
135	Kevin Brennan	Lab	Cardiff West	7 June 2001	16/10/1959	
136	Wayne David	Lab	Caerphilly	7 June 2001	01/07/1957	
137	The Rt Hon. Chris Grayling	C	Epsom and Ewell	7 June 2001	01/04/1962	
138	Jon Cruddas	Lab	Dagenham and Rainham	7 June 2001	07/04/1962	
139	Tom Watson	Lab	West Bromwich East	7 June 2001	08/01/1967	Deputy Leader, Lab 12 September 2015 –
140	The Rt Hon. Andy Burnham	Lab	Leigh	7 June 2001	07/01/1970	
141	John Mann	Lab	Bassetlaw	7 June 2001	10/01/1960	
142	Kevan Jones	Lab	North Durham	7 June 2001	25/04/1964	
143	The Rt Hon. Alistair Carmichael	LD	Orkney and Shetland	7 June 2001	15/07/1965	
144	Mike Weir	SNP	Angus	7 June 2001	24/03/1957	Chief Whip, SNP
145	John Baron	C	Basildon and Billericay	7 June 2001	21/06/1959	
146	Mark Prisk	C	Hertford and Stortford	7 June 2001	12/06/1962	
147	The Rt Hon. Mark Francois	C	Rayleigh and Wickford	7 June 2001	14/08/1965	
148	Andrew Selous	C	South West Bedfordshire	7 June 2001	27/04/1962	
149	The Rt Hon. Sir Hugo Swire	C	East Devon	7 June 2001	30/11/1959	
150	Khalid Mahmood	Lab	Birmingham Perry Barr	7 June 2001	13/07/1961	
151	The Rt Hon. Mark Field	C	Cities of London and Westminster	7 June 2001	06/10/1964	
152	Sir Henry Bellingham	C	North West Norfolk	7 June 2001	29/03/1955	Previously served 1983–1997.
153	Paul Farrelly	Lab	Newcastle-under-Lyme	7 June 2001	02/03/1962	
154	Dame Angela Watkinson	C	Hornchurch and Upminster	7 June 2001	18/11/1941	
155	Jonathan Djanogly	C	Huntingdon	7 June 2001	03/06/1965	
156	Andrew Murrison	C	South West Wiltshire	7 June 2001	24/04/1961	
157	Ian Liddell-Grainger	C	Bridgwater and West Somerset	7 June 2001	23/02/1959	
158	The Rt Hon. George Osborne	C	Tatton	7 June 2001	23/05/1971	
159	Ian Lucas	Lab	Wrexham	7 June 2001	18/09/1960	
160	John Pugh	LD	Southport	7 June 2001	28/06/1948	
161	Lady Hermon (Sylvia Hermon)	Ind	North Down	7 June 2001	11/08/1955	Widow of a knight
162	Mark Tami	Lab	Alyn and Deeside	7 June 2001	03/10/1962	
163	The Rt Hon. Norman Lamb	LD	North Norfolk	7 June 2001	16/09/1957	
164	Hywel Williams	PC	Arfon	7 June 2001	14/05/1953	
165	The Rt Hon. Alistair Burt	C	North East Bedfordshire	7 June 2001	25/05/1955	Previously served 1983–1997.
166	Albert Owen	Lab	Ynys Môn	7 June 2001	10/08/1959	
167	The Rt Hon. Angus Robertson	SNP	Moray	7 June 2001	28/09/1969	Parliamentary group leader, SNP
168	Andrew Turner	C	Isle of Wight	7 June 2001	24/10/1953	
169	Chris Bryant	Lab	Rhondda	7 June 2001	11/01/1962	
170	Pete Wishart	SNP	Perth and North Perthshire	7 June 2001	09/03/1962	
171	The Rt Hon. Andrew Mitchell	C	Sutton Coldfield	7 June 2001	23/03/1956	Previously served 1987–1997.
172	Huw Irranca-Davies	Lab	Ogmore	14 February 2002	22/01/1963	Resigned 23 March 2016
173	The Rt Hon. Liam Byrne	Lab	Birmingham Hodge Hill	15 July 2004	02/10/1970	
174	Iain Wright	Lab	Hartlepool	30 September 2004	09/05/1972	
54th Parliament (elected: 5 May 2005, first met: 11 May 2005, dissolved: 12 April 2010)
175	Mark Williams	LD	Ceredigion	5 May 2005	24/03/1966	
176	David Simpson	DUP	Upper Bann	5 May 2005	16/02/1959	
177	Charles Walker	C	Broxbourne	5 May 2005	11/09/1967	
178	Dave Anderson	Lab	Blaydon	5 May 2005	02/12/1953	
179	The Rt Hon. Tobias Ellwood	C	Bournemouth East	5 May 2005	12/08/1966	
180	Adam Afriyie	C	Windsor	5 May 2005	04/08/1965	
181	The Rt Hon. Nick Clegg	LD	Sheffield Hallam	5 May 2005	07/01/1967	Leader, LD –16 July 2015. Deputy Prime Minister 11 May 2010 – 8 May 2015.
182	Tim Farron	LD	Westmorland and Lonsdale	5 May 2005	27/05/1970	Leader, LD 16 July 2015 –
183	The Rt Hon. Anne Milton	C	Guildford	5 May 2005	03/11/1955	
184	Anne Main	C	St Albans	5 May 2005	17/05/1957	
185	The Rt Hon. David Evennett	C	Bexleyheath and Crayford	5 May 2005	03/06/1949	Previously served 1983–1997.
186	Stewart Hosie	SNP	Dundee East	5 May 2005	03/01/1963	Parliamentary group deputy leader, SNP
187	The Rt Hon. Grant Shapps	C	Welwyn Hatfield	5 May 2005	14/09/1968	
188	The Rt Hon. Mike Penning	C	Hemel Hempstead	5 May 2005	28/09/1957	
189	The Hon. Nick Hurd	C	Ruislip, Northwood and Pinner	5 May 2005	13/05/1962	
190	Daniel Kawczynski	C	Shrewsbury and Atcham	5 May 2005	24/01/1972	
191	The Rt Hon. Justine Greening	C	Putney	5 May 2005	30/04/1969	
192	The Rt Hon. Jeremy Wright	C	Kenilworth and Southam	5 May 2005	24/10/1972	
193	James Duddridge	C	Rochford and Southend East	5 May 2005	26/08/1971	
194	The Rt Hon. James Brokenshire	C	Old Bexley and Sidcup	5 May 2005	07/01/1968	
195	Philip Hollobone	C	Kettering	5 May 2005	07/11/1964	
196	The Rt Hon. Theresa Villiers	C	Chipping Barnet	5 May 2005	05/03/1968	
197	Rob Wilson	C	Reading East	5 May 2005	04/01/1965	
198	Peter Bone	C	Wellingborough	5 May 2005	19/10/1952	
199	The Rt Hon. David Gauke	C	South West Hertfordshire	5 May 2005	08/10/1971	
200	The Rt Hon. Nick Herbert	C	Arundel and South Downs	5 May 2005	07/04/1963	
201	The Rt Hon. Mark Harper	C	Forest of Dean	5 May 2005	26/02/1970	Chief Whip, C 9 May 2015 – 14 July 2016
202	The Rt Hon. David Mundell	C	Dumfriesshire, Clydesdale and Tweeddale	5 May 2005	27/05/1962	
203	Madeleine Moon	Lab	Bridgend	5 May 2005	27/03/1950	
204	John Penrose	C	Weston-Super-Mare	5 May 2005	22/06/1964	
205	Mark Pritchard	C	The Wrekin	5 May 2005	22/11/1966	
206	The Rt Hon. Maria Miller	C	Basingstoke	5 May 2005	26/03/1964	
207	Shailesh Vara	C	North West Cambridgeshire	5 May 2005	04/09/1960	
208	The Rt Hon. Richard Benyon	C	Newbury	5 May 2005	21/10/1960	
209	Douglas Carswell	UKIP	Clacton	5 May 2005	03/05/1971	Independent from 25 March 2017.
210	Mark Lancaster	C	Milton Keynes North	5 May 2005	12/05/1970	
211	The Rt Hon. Greg Hands	C	Chelsea and Fulham	5 May 2005	14/11/1965	
212	Sadiq Khan	Lab	Tooting	5 May 2005	08/10/1970	Resigned 9 May 2016
213	The Rt Hon. Ben Wallace	C	Wyre and Preston North	5 May 2005	15/05/1970	
214	The Rt Hon. Jeremy Hunt	C	South West Surrey	5 May 2005	01/11/1966	
215	David Davies	C	Monmouth	5 May 2005	22/07/1970	
216	The Rt Hon. David Jones	C	Clwyd West	5 May 2005	22/03/1952	
217	Lyn Brown	Lab	West Ham	5 May 2005	13/04/1960	
218	Philip Davies	C	Shipley	5 May 2005	05/01/1972	
219	Stephen Hammond	C	Wimbledon	5 May 2005	04/02/1962	
220	The Hon. Ed Vaizey	C	Wantage	5 May 2005	05/06/1968	
221	Andrew Gwynne	Lab	Denton and Reddish	5 May 2005	04/06/1974	
222	Stewart Jackson	C	Peterborough	5 May 2005	31/01/1965	
223	The Rt Hon. Stephen Crabb	C	Preseli Pembrokeshire	5 May 2005	20/01/1973	
224	Greg Mulholland	LD	Leeds North West	5 May 2005	31/08/1970	
225	Mary Creagh	Lab	Wakefield	5 May 2005	02/12/1967	
226	Mark Durkan	SDLP	Foyle	5 May 2005	26/06/1970	
227	Alasdair McDonnell	SDLP	Belfast South	5 May 2005	01/09/1949	Leader, SDLP
228	Helen Goodman	Lab	Bishop Auckland	5 May 2005	02/01/1958	
229	The Rt Hon. Pat McFadden	Lab	Wolverhampton South East	5 May 2005	26/03/1965	
230	Meg Hillier	Lab	Hackney South and Shoreditch	5 May 2005	14/02/1969	
231	Sammy Wilson	DUP	East Antrim	5 May 2005	04/04/1953	
232	Robert Goodwill	C	Scarborough and Whitby	5 May 2005	31/12/1956	
233	Adam Holloway	C	Gravesham	5 May 2005	29/07/1965	
234	Natascha Engel	Lab	North East Derbyshire	5 May 2005	09/04/1967	Deputy Speaker:2nd Dep. Ch., Ways and Means
235	Roberta Blackman-Woods	Lab	City of Durham	5 May 2005	16/08/1957	
236	Robert Flello	Lab	Stoke-on-Trent South	5 May 2005	14/01/1966	
237	The Rt Hon. Greg Clark	C	Tunbridge Wells	5 May 2005	28/08/1967	
238	The Rt Hon. Michael Gove	C	Surrey Heath	5 May 2005	26/08/1967	Chief Whip, C 15 July 2014 – 9 May 2015
239	Angela Smith	Lab	Penistone and Stocksbridge	5 May 2005	16/08/1961	
240	Kerry McCarthy	Lab	Bristol East	5 May 2005	26/03/1965	
241	Jessica Morden	Lab	Newport East	5 May 2005	29/05/1968	
242	Diana Johnson	Lab	Kingston upon Hull North	5 May 2005	25/07/1966	
243	Graham Stuart	C	Beverley and Holderness	5 May 2005	12/03/1962	
244	Nadine Dorries	C	Mid Bedfordshire	5 May 2005	21/05/1957	
245	David Burrowes	C	Enfield Southgate	5 May 2005	12/06/1969	
246	The Rt Hon. Emily Thornberry	Lab	Islington South and Finsbury	5 May 2005	27/07/1960	
247	Barbara Keeley	Lab	Worsley and Eccles South	5 May 2005	26/03/1952	
248	Sharon Hodgson	Lab	Washington and Sunderland West	5 May 2005	01/04/1966	
249	Geoffrey Cox	C	Torridge and West Devon	5 May 2005	30/04/1960	
250	Andy Slaughter	Lab	Hammersmith	5 May 2005	29/09/1960	
251	The Rt Hon. Ed Miliband	Lab	Doncaster North	5 May 2005	24/12/1969	Leader, Lab and Leader of the Opposition 25 September 2010 – 8 May 2015
252	Jamie Reed	Lab	Copeland	5 May 2005	04/08/1973	Resigned on 23 January 2017
253	Ian Austin	Lab	Dudley North	5 May 2005	06/03/1965	
254	Philip Dunne	C	Ludlow	5 May 2005	14/08/1958	
255	Angus MacNeil	SNP	Na h-Eileanan an Iar	5 May 2005	21/07/1970	
256	Rosie Cooper	Lab	West Lancashire	5 May 2005	05/09/1950	
257	Nia Griffith	Lab	Llanelli	5 May 2005	04/12/1956	
258	Bob Neill	C	Bromley and Chislehurst	29 June 2006	24/06/1952	
259	Virendra Sharma	Lab	Ealing Southall	19 July 2007	05/04/1947	
260	Phil Wilson	Lab	Sedgefield	19 July 2007	31/05/1959	
261	Edward Timpson	C	Crewe and Nantwich	22 May 2008	26/12/1973	
262	John Howell	C	Henley	26 June 2008	27/07/1955	
263	Chloe Smith	C	Norwich North	23 July 2009	17/05/1982	
55th Parliament (elected: 6 May 2010, first met: 18 May 2010, dissolved: 30 March 2015)
264	Valerie Vaz	Lab	Walsall South	6 May 2010	07/12/1954	
265	Chris Leslie	Lab	Nottingham East	6 May 2010	28/06/1972	Previously served 1997–2005.
266	Catherine McKinnell	Lab	Newcastle upon Tyne North	6 May 2010	08/06/1976	
267	Rory Stewart	C	Penrith and The Border	6 May 2010	03/01/1973	
268	Bob Stewart	C	Beckenham	6 May 2010	07/07/1949	
269	Chris Heaton-Harris	C	Daventry	6 May 2010	28/11/1967	
270	Iain Stewart	C	Milton Keynes South	6 May 2010	18/09/1972	
271	Andrew Bridgen	C	North West Leicestershire	6 May 2010	28/10/1964	
272	Nigel Mills	C	Amber Valley	6 May 2010	28/10/1974	
273	Neil Parish	C	Tiverton and Honiton	6 May 2010	26/05/1956	
274	Jack Lopresti	C	Filton and Bradley Stoke	6 May 2010	23/08/1969	
275	Jonathan Reynolds	Lab	Stalybridge and Hyde	6 May 2010	28/08/1980	
276	Pat Glass	Lab	North West Durham	6 May 2010	14/02/1957	
277	Simon Hart	C	Carmarthen West and South Pembrokeshire	6 May 2010	15/08/1963	
278	Martin Vickers	C	Cleethorpes	6 May 2010	13/09/1950	
279	Geraint Davies	Lab	Swansea West	6 May 2010	03/05/1960	Previously served 1997–2005.
280	John Cryer	Lab	Leyton and Wanstead	6 May 2010	11/04/1964	Previously served 1997–2005.
281	The Rt Hon. Priti Patel	C	Witham	6 May 2010	29/03/1972	
282	Charlie Elphicke	C	Dover	6 May 2010	14/03/1971	
283	Alec Shelbrooke	C	Elmet and Rothwell	6 May 2010	10/01/1976	
284	Nigel Adams	C	Selby and Ainsty	6 May 2010	30/11/1966	
285	Charlotte Leslie	C	Bristol North West	6 May 2010	11/08/1978	
286	Sam Gyimah	C	East Surrey	6 May 2010	10/08/1976	
287	Mel Stride	C	Central Devon	6 May 2010	30/09/1961	
288	Claire Perry	C	Devizes	6 May 2010	03/04/1964	
289	Damian Hinds	C	East Hampshire	6 May 2010	27/11/1969	
290	Guto Bebb	C	Aberconwy	6 May 2010	09/10/1968	
291	The Rt Hon. Anna Soubry	C	Broxtowe	6 May 2010	07/12/1956	
292	Mark Spencer	C	Sherwood	6 May 2010	20/01/1970	
293	Ian Lavery	Lab	Wansbeck	6 May 2010	06/01/1963	
294	Grahame Morris	Lab	Easington	6 May 2010	13/03/1961	
295	Ian Mearns	Lab	Gateshead	6 May 2010	21/04/1957	
296	Richard Harrington	C	Watford	6 May 2010	04/11/1957	
297	The Rt Hon. Sajid Javid	C	Bromsgrove	6 May 2010	05/12/1969	
298	The Rt Hon. Robert Halfon	C	Harlow	6 May 2010	22/03/1969	
299	John Glen	C	Salisbury	6 May 2010	01/04/1974	
300	Andrew Griffiths	C	Burton	6 May 2010	19/10/1970	
301	Jesse Norman	C	Hereford and South Herefordshire	6 May 2010	23/06/1962	
302	David Morris	C	Morecambe and Lunesdale	6 May 2010	03/01/1966	
303	Richard Drax	C	South Dorset	6 May 2010	29/01/1958	
304	Bob Blackman	C	Harrow East	6 May 2010	26/04/1956	
305	Fiona Bruce	C	Congleton	6 May 2010	26/03/1957	
306	Karl McCartney	C	Lincoln	6 May 2010	25/10/1968	
307	Kris Hopkins	C	Keighley	6 May 2010	08/06/1963	
308	Sarah Wollaston	C	Totnes	6 May 2010	17/02/1962	
309	Dan Poulter	C	Central Suffolk and North Ipswich	6 May 2010	30/10/1978	
310	Tracey Crouch	C	Chatham and Aylesford	6 May 2010	24/07/1975	
311	Mary Glindon	Lab	North Tyneside	6 May 2010	13/01/1957	
312	Julie Elliott	Lab	Sunderland Central	6 May 2010	29/07/1963	
313	Heather Wheeler	C	South Derbyshire	6 May 2010	14/05/1959	
314	Peter Aldous	C	Waveney	6 May 2010	26/08/1961	
315	James Morris	C	Halesowen and Rowley Regis	6 May 2010	04/02/1967	
316	Mark Garnier	C	Wyre Forest	6 May 2010	26/02/1963	
317	Pauline Latham	C	Mid Derbyshire	6 May 2010	04/02/1948	
318	Chuka Umunna	Lab	Streatham	6 May 2010	17/10/1978	
319	Andrew Percy	C	Brigg and Goole	6 May 2010	18/09/1977	
320	Dominic Raab	C	Esher and Walton	6 May 2010	25/02/1974	
321	Damian Collins	C	Folkestone and Hythe	6 May 2010	04/02/1974	
322	Caroline Nokes	C	Romsey and Southampton North	6 May 2010	26/06/1972	
323	Caroline Dinenage	C	Gosport	6 May 2010	28/10/1971	
324	Conor Burns	C	Bournemouth West	6 May 2010	24/09/1972	
325	Mark Menzies	C	Fylde	6 May 2010	18/05/1971	
326	Toby Perkins	Lab	Chesterfield	6 May 2010	12/08/1970	
327	Bill Esterson	Lab	Sefton Central	6 May 2010	27/10/1966	
328	Yasmin Qureshi	Lab	Bolton South East	6 May 2010	05/07/1963	
329	The Hon. Ian Paisley Jr	DUP	North Antrim	6 May 2010	12/12/1966	
330	Graham Evans	C	Weaver Vale	6 May 2010	10/11/1963	
331	Kate Green	Lab	Stretford and Urmston	6 May 2010	02/05/1960	
332	Rachel Reeves	Lab	Leeds West	6 May 2010	13/02/1979	
333	Jonathan Lord	C	Woking	6 May 2010	17/09/1962	
334	Richard Fuller	C	Bedford	6 May 2010	30/05/1962	
335	Julian Smith	C	Skipton and Ripon	6 May 2010	30/08/1971	
336	Lilian Greenwood	Lab	Nottingham South	6 May 2010	26/03/1966	
337	Owen Smith	Lab	Pontypridd	6 May 2010	02/05/1970	
338	Chris Evans	Lab	Islwyn	6 May 2010	07/07/1976	
339	James Wharton	C	Stockton South	6 May 2010	16/02/1984	
340	Julian Sturdy	C	York Outer	6 May 2010	03/06/1971	
341	Craig Whittaker	C	Calder Valley	6 May 2010	30/08/1962	
342	Therese Coffey	C	Suffolk Coastal	6 May 2010	18/11/1971	
343	Chris Skidmore	C	Kingswood	6 May 2010	17/05/1981	
344	Jonathan Edwards	PC	Carmarthen East and Dinefwr	6 May 2010	26/04/1976	Parliamentary group leader, PC 19 May 2015 –
345	Jeremy Lefroy	C	Stafford	6 May 2010	30/05/1959	
346	Christopher Pincher	C	Tamworth	6 May 2010	24/09/1969	
347	The Rt Hon. Nicky Morgan	C	Loughborough	6 May 2010	01/10/1972	
348	John Woodcock	Lab	Barrow and Furness	6 May 2010	14/10/1978	
349	George Freeman	C	Mid Norfolk	6 May 2010	12/07/1967	
350	Gavin Shuker	Lab	Luton South	6 May 2010	10/10/1981	
351	Bridget Phillipson	Lab	Houghton and Sunderland South	6 May 2010	19/12/1983	
352	Nick Smith	Lab	Blaenau Gwent	6 May 2010	14/01/1960	
353	David Rutley	C	Macclesfield	6 May 2010	07/03/1961	
354	Simon Kirby	C	Brighton Kemptown	6 May 2010	22/12/1964	
355	Karl Turner	Lab	Kingston upon Hull East	6 May 2010	15/04/1971	
356	Eilidh Whiteford	SNP	Banff and Buchan	6 May 2010	24/04/1969	
357	Penny Mordaunt	C	Portsmouth North	6 May 2010	04/03/1973	
358	Andrew Bingham	C	High Peak	6 May 2010	23/06/1962	
359	Alex Cunningham	Lab	Stockton North	6 May 2010	01/05/1955	
360	Chi Onwurah	Lab	Newcastle upon Tyne Central	6 May 2010	12/04/1965	
361	Heidi Alexander	Lab	Lewisham East	6 May 2010	17/04/1975	
362	Yvonne Fovargue	Lab	Makerfield	6 May 2010	29/11/1956	
363	Gloria De Piero	Lab	Ashfield	6 May 2010	21/12/1972	
364	Michael Dugher	Lab	Barnsley East	6 May 2010	26/04/1975	
365	Jenny Chapman	Lab	Darlington	6 May 2010	25/09/1973	
366	Liz Kendall	Lab	Leicester West	6 May 2010	11/06/1971	
367	Luciana Berger	Lab	Liverpool Wavertree	6 May 2010	13/05/1981	
368	The Hon. Tristram Hunt	Lab	Stoke-on-Trent Central	6 May 2010	31/05/1974	Resigned on 23 January 2017
369	Neil Carmichael	C	Stroud	6 May 2010	15/04/1961	
370	Anne Marie Morris	C	Newton Abbot	6 May 2010	05/07/1957	
371	Henry Smith	C	Crawley	6 May 2010	14/05/1969	
372	Tom Blenkinsop	Lab	Middlesbrough South and East Cleveland	6 May 2010	14/08/1980	
373	Phillip Lee	C	Bracknell	6 May 2010	28/09/1970	
374	The Rt Hon. Liz Truss	C	South West Norfolk	6 May 2010	26/07/1975	
375	Guy Opperman	C	Hexham	6 May 2010	18/05/1965	
376	David Nuttall	C	Bury North	6 May 2010	25/03/1962	
377	Sheryll Murray	C	South East Cornwall	6 May 2010	04/02/1956	
378	Gavin Barwell	C	Croydon Central	6 May 2010	23/01/1972	
379	Helen Grant	C	Maidstone and The Weald	6 May 2010	28/09/1961	
380	The Rt Hon. Andrea Leadsom	C	South Northamptonshire	6 May 2010	13/05/1963	
381	Richard Graham	C	Gloucester	6 May 2010	04/04/1958	
382	Alok Sharma	C	Reading West	6 May 2010	07/09/1967	
383	Gareth Johnson	C	Dartford	6 May 2010	12/10/1969	
384	Marcus Jones	C	Nuneaton	6 May 2010	05/04/1974	
385	Andrew Stephenson	C	Pendle	6 May 2010	17/02/1981	
386	Steve Brine	C	Winchester	6 May 2010	28/01/1974	
387	The Rt Hon. Brandon Lewis	C	Great Yarmouth	6 May 2010	20/06/1971	
388	Jackie Doyle-Price	C	Thurrock	6 May 2010	05/08/1969	
389	Jo Johnson	C	Orpington	6 May 2010	23/12/1971	
390	Margot James	C	Stourbridge	6 May 2010	28/08/1957	
391	Mike Freer	C	Finchley and Golders Green	6 May 2010	29/05/1960	
392	Jane Ellison	C	Battersea	6 May 2010	15/08/1964	
393	Stephen Metcalfe	C	South Basildon and East Thurrock	6 May 2010	09/01/1966	
394	Stephen McPartland	C	Stevenage	6 May 2010	09/08/1976	
395	Gordon Henderson	C	Sittingbourne and Sheppey	6 May 2010	27/01/1948	
396	Nicola Blackwood	C	Oxford West and Abingdon	6 May 2010	16/10/1979	
397	The Rt. Hon. Alun Cairns	C	Vale of Glamorgan	6 May 2010	30/07/1970	
398	Glyn Davies	C	Montgomeryshire	6 May 2010	16/02/1944	
399	Harriett Baldwin	C	West Worcestershire	6 May 2010	02/05/1960	
400	Steve Barclay	C	North East Cambridgeshire	6 May 2010	03/05/1972	
401	The Rt Hon. Gavin Williamson	C	South Staffordshire	6 May 2010	25/06/1976	Chief Whip, C 14 July 2016 –
402	The Hon. Robin Walker	C	Worcester	6 May 2010	12/04/1978	
403	Michael Ellis	C	Northampton North	6 May 2010	13/10/1967	
404	Nadhim Zahawi	C	Stratford-on-Avon	6 May 2010	02/06/1967	
405	George Eustice	C	Camborne and Redruth	6 May 2010	28/09/1971	
406	Karen Lumley	C	Redditch	6 May 2010	28/03/1964	
407	George Hollingbery	C	Meon Valley	6 May 2010	12/10/1963	
408	Robert Buckland	C	South Swindon	6 May 2010	22/09/1968	
409	Justin Tomlinson	C	North Swindon	6 May 2010	05/11/1976	
410	Rehman Chishti	C	Gillingham and Rainham	6 May 2010	04/10/1978	
411	The Rt Hon. Ben Gummer	C	Ipswich	6 May 2010	19/02/1978	
412	Jason McCartney	C	Colne Valley	6 May 2010	29/01/1968	
413	Paul Maynard	C	Blackpool North and Cleveleys	6 May 2010	16/12/1975	
414	Andrew Jones	C	Harrogate and Knaresborough	6 May 2010	28/11/1963	
415	Stephen Phillips	C	Sleaford and North Hykeham	6 May 2010	09/03/1970	Resigned on 4 November 2016
416	Lisa Nandy	Lab	Wigan	6 May 2010	09/08/1979	
417	Paul Blomfield	Lab	Sheffield Central	6 May 2010	25/08/1953	
418	David Mowat	C	Warrington South	6 May 2010	20/02/1957	
419	The Rt Hon. Matthew Hancock	C	West Suffolk	6 May 2010	02/10/1978	
420	Chris White	C	Warwick and Leamington	6 May 2010	28/04/1967	
421	Stuart Andrew	C	Pudsey	6 May 2010	25/11/1971	
422	Susan Elan Jones	Lab	Clwyd South	6 May 2010	01/06/1968	
423	Ian Murray	Lab	Edinburgh South	6 May 2010	10/08/1976	
424	Rebecca Harris	C	Castle Point	6 May 2010	22/12/1967	
425	Caroline Lucas	GP	Brighton Pavilion	6 May 2010	09/12/1960	
426	Matthew Offord	C	Hendon	6 May 2010	03/09/1969	
427	Steve Rotheram	Lab	Liverpool Walton	6 May 2010	04/11/1961	
428	Teresa Pearce	Lab	Erith and Thamesmead	6 May 2010	01/02/1955	
429	Jake Berry	C	Rossendale and Darwen	6 May 2010	29/12/1978	
430	Jack Dromey	Lab	Birmingham Erdington	6 May 2010	21/09/1948	
431	John Stevenson	C	Carlisle	6 May 2010	04/07/1963	
432	The Hon. Jacob Rees-Mogg	C	North East Somerset	6 May 2010	24/05/1969	
433	Nick Boles	C	Grantham and Stamford	6 May 2010	02/11/1965	
434	The Rt Hon. Amber Rudd	C	Hastings and Rye	6 May 2010	01/08/1963	
435	Sarah Newton	C	Truro and Falmouth	6 May 2010	19/07/1961	
436	Nic Dakin	Lab	Scunthorpe	6 May 2010	10/07/1955	
437	Rushanara Ali	Lab	Bethnal Green and Bow	6 May 2010	14/03/1975	
438	Shabana Mahmood	Lab	Birmingham Ladywood	6 May 2010	17/09/1980	
439	Simon Danczuk	Lab	Rochdale	6 May 2010	24/10/1966	Whip suspended and sat as Independent from 31 December 2015
440	Graham Jones	Lab	Hyndburn	6 May 2010	03/03/1966	
441	Emma Reynolds	Lab	Wolverhampton North East	6 May 2010	02/11/1977	
442	Kwasi Kwarteng	C	Spelthorne	6 May 2010	26/05/1975	
443	Zac Goldsmith	C	Richmond Park	6 May 2010	20/01/1975	Resigned on 25 October 2016
444	Mark Pawsey	C	Rugby	6 May 2010	16/01/1957	
445	Oliver Colvile	C	Plymouth Sutton and Devonport	6 May 2010	26/08/1959	
446	Steve Baker	C	Wycombe	6 May 2010	06/06/1971	
447	Stephen Twigg	Lab	Liverpool West Derby	6 May 2010	25/12/1966	Previously served 1997–2005.
448	Margaret Ritchie	SDLP	South Down	6 May 2010	25/03/1958	
449	Jim Shannon	DUP	Strangford	6 May 2010	25/03/1955	
450	The Rt Hon. Karen Bradley	C	Staffordshire Moorlands	6 May 2010	12/03/1970	
451	Stella Creasy	Lab	Walthamstow	6 May 2010	05/04/1977	
452	Alison McGovern	Lab	Wirral South	6 May 2010	30/12/1980	
453	Debbie Abrahams	Lab	Oldham East and Saddleworth	13 January 2011	15/09/1960	
454	Dan Jarvis	Lab	Barnsley Central	3 March 2011	30/11/1972	
455	Jonathan Ashworth	Lab	Leicester South	5 May 2011	14/10/1978	
456	Seema Malhotra	Lab	Feltham and Heston	15 December 2011	07/08/1972	
457	Stephen Doughty	Lab	Cardiff South and Penarth	15 November 2012	15/04/1980	
458	Lucy Powell	Lab	Manchester Central	15 November 2012	10/10/1974	
459	Sarah Champion	Lab	Rotherham	29 November 2012	10/07/1969	
460	Andy McDonald	Lab	Middlesbrough	29 November 2012	08/03/1958	
461	Steve Reed	Lab	Croydon North	29 November 2012	12/11/1963	
462	Emma Lewell-Buck	Lab	South Shields	2 May 2013	08/11/1978	
463	Mike Kane	Lab	Wythenshawe and Sale East	13 February 2014	09/01/1969	
464	Robert Jenrick	C	Newark	5 June 2014	09/01/1982	
465	Liz McInnes	Lab	Heywood and Middleton	9 October 2014	30/03/1959	
56th Parliament (elected: 7 May 2015, first met: 18 May 2015, dissolved: 3 May 2017)
466	The Rt Hon. Alex Salmond	SNP	Gordon	7 May 2015	31/12/1954	Previously served 1987–2010.
467	Simon Hoare	C	North Dorset	7 May 2015	28/06/1969	
468	Kevin Hollinrake	C	Thirsk and Malton	7 May 2015	28/09/1963	
469	Ranil Jayawardena	C	North East Hampshire	7 May 2015	03/09/1986	
470	Alan Mak	C	Havant	7 May 2015	19/11/1983	
471	Tom Tugendhat	C	Tonbridge and Malling	7 May 2015	27/06/1973	
472	Chris Philp	C	Croydon South	7 May 2015	06/07/1976	
473	Amanda Solloway	C	Derby North	7 May 2015	04/06/1961	
474	Craig Williams	C	Cardiff North	7 May 2015	07/06/1985	
475	Judith Cummins	Lab	Bradford South	7 May 2015	26/06/1967	
476	Liz Saville-Roberts	PC	Dwyfor Meirionnydd	7 May 2015	16/12/1964	
477	Kevin Foster	C	Torbay	7 May 2015	31/12/1978	
478	Conor McGinn	Lab	St Helens North	7 May 2015	31/07/1984	
479	The Rt Hon. The Lady Borwick (Victoria Borwick)	C	Kensington	7 May 2015	26/04/1956	Wife of a peer
480	Kate Hollern	Lab	Blackburn	7 May 2015	12/04/1955	
481	Peter Dowd	Lab	Bootle	7 May 2015	20/06/1957	
482	Tom Pursglove	C	Corby	7 May 2015	05/11/1988	
483	Nus Ghani	C	Wealden	7 May 2015	01/09/1972	
484	Johnny Mercer	C	Plymouth Moor View	7 May 2015	17/08/1981	
485	Anne-Marie Trevelyan	C	Berwick-upon-Tweed	7 May 2015	06/04/1969	
486	Rebecca Pow	C	Taunton Deane	7 May 2015	10/10/1960	
487	Michael Tomlinson-Mynors	C	Mid Dorset and North Poole	7 May 2015	01/10/1977	
488	Steve Double	C	St Austell and Newquay	7 May 2015	19/12/1966	
489	Mims Davies	C	Eastleigh	7 May 2015	02/06/1975	
490	Marcus Fysh	C	Yeovil	7 May 2015	08/11/1970	
491	Antoinette Sandbach	C	Eddisbury	7 May 2015	15/02/1969	
492	Danny Kinahan	UUP	South Antrim	7 May 2015	14/04/1958	
493	James Heappey	C	Wells	7 May 2015	30/01/1981	
494	Peter Heaton-Jones	C	North Devon	7 May 2015	02/08/1963	
495	Angela Rayner	Lab	Ashton-under-Lyne	7 May 2015	28/03/1980	
496	Matthew Pennycook	Lab	Greenwich and Woolwich	7 May 2015	29/10/1982	
497	Rupa Huq	Lab	Ealing Central and Acton	7 May 2015	02/04/1972	
498	Maggie Throup	C	Erewash	7 May 2015	27/01/1957	
499	Alberto Costa	C	South Leicestershire	7 May 2015	13/11/1971	
500	Chris Matheson	Lab	City of Chester	7 May 2015	02/01/1968	
501	Royston Smith	C	Southampton Itchen	7 May 2015	13/05/1964	
502	Suella Fernandes	C	Fareham	7 May 2015	03/04/1980	
503	Edward Argar	C	Charnwood	7 May 2015	09/12/1977	
504	Matt Warman	C	Boston and Skegness	7 May 2015	01/09/1981	
505	Nigel Huddleston	C	Mid Worcestershire	7 May 2015	13/10/1970	
506	Mike Wood	C	Dudley South	7 May 2015	17/03/1976	
507	Sue Hayman	Lab	Workington	7 May 2015	28/07/1962	
508	Melanie Onn	Lab	Great Grimsby	7 May 2015	19/06/1979	
509	Byron Davies	C	Gower	7 May 2015	04/09/1952	
510	The Rt Hon. Joan Ryan	Lab	Enfield North	7 May 2015	08/09/1955	Previously served 1997–2010.
511	Dawn Butler	Lab	Brent Central	7 May 2015	03/11/1969	Previously served 2005–2010.
512	Catherine West	Lab	Hornsey and Wood Green	7 May 2015	14/09/1966	
513	Ian Blackford	SNP	Ross, Skye and Lochaber	7 May 2015	14/05/1961	
514	Angela Crawley	SNP	Lanark and Hamilton East	7 May 2015	03/06/1987	
515	Mhairi Black	SNP	Paisley and Renfrewshire South	7 May 2015	12/09/1994	
516	Neil Gray	SNP	Airdrie and Shotts	7 May 2015	16/03/1986	
517	Philippa Whitford	SNP	Central Ayrshire	7 May 2015	24/12/1958	
518	Joanna Cherry	SNP	Edinburgh South West	7 May 2015	18/03/1966	
519	Michelle Thomson	SNP	Edinburgh West	7 May 2015	11/03/1965	Resigned whip and sat as an independent: 29 September 2015
520	George Kerevan	SNP	East Lothian	7 May 2015	28/09/1949	
521	Lisa Cameron	SNP	East Kilbride, Strathaven and Lesmahagow	7 May 2015	08/04/1972	
522	John McNally	SNP	Falkirk	7 May 2015	01/02/1951	
523	Hannah Bardell	SNP	Livingston	7 May 2015	01/06/1983	
524	Stewart McDonald	SNP	Glasgow South	7 May 2015	24/08/1986	
525	Martyn Day	SNP	Linlithgow and East Falkirk	7 May 2015	26/03/1971	
526	Kate Osamor	Lab	Edmonton	7 May 2015	15/08/1968	
527	Paula Sherriff	Lab	Dewsbury	7 May 2015	16/04/1975	
528	Naz Shah	Lab	Bradford West	7 May 2015	13/11/1973	
529	Nick Thomas-Symonds	Lab	Torfaen	7 May 2015	26/05/1980	
530	Drew Hendry	SNP	Inverness, Nairn, Badenoch and Strathspey	7 May 2015	21/05/1964	
531	Paul Monaghan	SNP	Caithness, Sutherland and Easter Ross	7 May 2015	11/11/1966	
532	Corri Wilson	SNP	Ayr, Carrick and Cumnock	7 May 2015	11/04/1965	
533	Carol Monaghan	SNP	Glasgow North West	7 May 2015	02/08/1972	
534	Alan Brown	SNP	Kilmarnock and Loudoun	7 May 2015	12/08/1970	
535	Ronnie Cowan	SNP	Inverclyde	7 May 2015	06/09/1959	
536	Patricia Gibson	SNP	North Ayrshire and Arran	7 May 2015	12/05/1968	
537	Tom Elliott	UUP	Fermanagh and South Tyrone	7 May 2015	11/12/1963	
538	Helen Hayes	Lab	Dulwich and West Norwood	7 May 2015	08/08/1974	
539	Vicky Foxcroft	Lab	Lewisham Deptford	7 May 2015	09/03/1977	
540	Brendan O'Hara	SNP	Argyll and Bute	7 May 2015	27/04/1963	
541	Kirsten Oswald	SNP	East Renfrewshire	7 May 2015	21/12/1972	
542	Marion Fellows	SNP	Motherwell and Wishaw	7 May 2015	05/05/1949	
543	Tasmina Ahmed-Sheikh	SNP	Ochil and South Perthshire	7 May 2015	05/10/1970	
544	Marie Rimmer	Lab	St Helens South and Whiston	7 May 2015	27/04/1947	
545	Richard Arkless	SNP	Dumfries and Galloway	7 May 2015	07/07/1975	
546	Phil Boswell	SNP	Coatbridge, Chryston and Bellshill	7 May 2015	23/07/1963	
547	Thangam Debbonaire	Lab	Bristol West	7 May 2015	03/08/1966	
548	Holly Lynch	Lab	Halifax	7 May 2015	08/10/1986	
549	Stuart Donaldson	SNP	West Aberdeenshire and Kincardine	7 May 2015	05/09/1991	
550	Stephen Gethins	SNP	North East Fife	7 May 2015	28/03/1976	
551	Patrick Grady	SNP	Glasgow North	7 May 2015	05/02/1980	
552	Owen Thompson	SNP	Midlothian	7 May 2015	17/03/1978	
553	Harry Harpham	Lab	Sheffield, Brightside and Hillsborough	7 May 2015	21/02/1954	Died 4 February 2016
554	Kirsty Blackman	SNP	Aberdeen North	7 May 2015	20/03/1986	
555	Jess Phillips	Lab	Birmingham Yardley	7 May 2015	09/10/1981	
556	Justin Madders	Lab	Ellesmere Port and Neston	7 May 2015	22/11/1972	
557	Chris Law	SNP	Dundee West	7 May 2015	21/10/1969	
558	Chris Stephens	SNP	Glasgow South West	7 May 2015	20/03/1973	
559	The Hon. Victoria Prentis	C	Banbury	7 May 2015	24/03/1971	
560	Flick Drummond	C	Portsmouth South	7 May 2015	16/06/1962	
561	Colleen Fletcher	Lab	Coventry North East	7 May 2015	23/11/1954	
562	Cat Smith	Lab	Lancaster and Fleetwood	7 May 2015	16/06/1985	
563	Deidre Brock	SNP	Edinburgh North and Leith	7 May 2015	08/12/1961	
564	Natalie McGarry	SNP	Glasgow East	7 May 2015	07/09/1981	Resigned whip and sat as an independent: 24 November 2015
565	Rebecca Long-Bailey	Lab	Salford and Eccles	7 May 2015	22/09/1979	
566	Maria Caulfield	C	Lewes	7 May 2015	06/08/1973	
567	Roger Mullin	SNP	Kirkcaldy and Cowdenbeath	7 May 2015	12/03/1948	
568	Callum McCaig	SNP	Aberdeen South	7 May 2015	06/01/1985	
569	Stuart McDonald	SNP	Cumbernauld, Kilsyth and Kirkintilloch East	7 May 2015	02/05/1978	
570	Richard Burgon	Lab	Leeds East	7 May 2015	19/09/1980	
571	Imran Hussain	Lab	Bradford East	7 May 2015	07/06/1978	
572	Alison Thewliss	SNP	Glasgow Central	7 May 2015	13/09/1982	
573	Daniel Zeichner	Lab	Cambridge	7 May 2015	09/11/1956	
574	Margaret Ferrier	SNP	Rutherglen and Hamilton West	7 May 2015	10/09/1960	
575	Douglas Chapman	SNP	Dunfermline and West Fife	7 May 2015	05/01/1955	
576	Tommy Sheppard	SNP	Edinburgh East	7 May 2015	06/03/1959	
577	Jo Cox	Lab	Batley and Spen	7 May 2015	22/06/1974	Died 16 June 2016
578	Rachael Maskell	Lab	York Central	7 May 2015	05/07/1972	
579	Louise Haigh	Lab	Sheffield Heeley	7 May 2015	22/07/1987	
580	Lucy Allan	C	Telford	7 May 2015	02/10/1964	
581	David Mackintosh	C	Northampton South	7 May 2015	02/04/1979	
582	Jo Stevens	Lab	Cardiff Central	7 May 2015	06/09/1966	
583	Lucy Frazer	C	South East Cambridgeshire	7 May 2015	17/05/1972	
584	Victoria Atkins	C	Louth and Horncastle	7 May 2015	22/03/1976	
585	Seema Kennedy	C	South Ribble	7 May 2015	06/10/1974	
586	Christopher Davies	C	Brecon and Radnorshire	7 May 2015	18/08/1967	
587	Karin Smyth	Lab	Bristol South	7 May 2015	08/09/1964	
588	Paul Scully	C	Sutton and Cheam	7 May 2015	29/04/1968	
589	James Berry	C	Kingston and Surbiton	7 May 2015	04/08/1983	
590	Clive Lewis	Lab	Norwich South	7 May 2015	11/09/1971	
591	Ben Howlett	C	Bath	7 May 2015	21/08/1986	
592	Wendy Morton	C	Aldridge-Brownhills	7 May 2015	09/11/1967	
593	Gerald Jones	Lab	Merthyr Tydfil and Rhymney	7 May 2015	21/08/1970	
594	Kit Malthouse	C	North West Hampshire	7 May 2015	27/10/1966	
595	Margaret Greenwood	Lab	Wirral West	7 May 2015	14/03/1959	
596	Luke Hall	C	Thornbury and Yate	7 May 2015	08/07/1986	
597	Scott Mann	C	North Cornwall	7 May 2015	24/06/1977	
598	Julian Knight	C	Solihull	7 May 2015	05/01/1972	
599	Craig Tracey	C	North Warwickshire	7 May 2015	21/08/1974	
600	Amanda Milling	C	Cannock Chase	7 May 2015	12/03/1975	
601	Andrea Jenkyns	C	Morley and Outwood	7 May 2015	16/06/1974	
602	Chris Green	C	Bolton West	7 May 2015	12/08/1973	
603	Jo Churchill	C	Bury St Edmunds	7 May 2015	18/03/1964	
604	James Cartlidge	C	South Suffolk	7 May 2015	30/04/1974	
605	Oliver Dowden	C	Hertsmere	7 May 2015	01/08/1978	
606	Huw Merriman	C	Bexhill and Battle	7 May 2015	13/07/1973	
607	Helen Whately	C	Faversham and Mid Kent	7 May 2015	23/06/1976	
608	Julie Cooper	Lab	Burnley	7 May 2015	20/06/1960	
609	Tulip Siddiq	Lab	Hampstead and Kilburn	7 May 2015	16/09/1982	
610	Anne McLaughlin	SNP	Glasgow North East	7 May 2015	08/03/1966	
611	Jeff Smith	Lab	Manchester Withington	7 May 2015	26/01/1963	
612	Steven Paterson	SNP	Stirling	7 May 2015	25/04/1975	
613	Sir Keir Starmer	Lab	Holborn and St Pancras	7 May 2015	02/09/1962	
614	John Nicolson	SNP	East Dunbartonshire	7 May 2015	23/06/1961	
615	Anna Turley	Lab	Redcar	7 May 2015	09/10/1978	
616	James Cleverly	C	Braintree	7 May 2015	04/09/1969	
617	Will Quince	C	Colchester	7 May 2015	27/12/1982	
618	Ruth Cadbury	Lab	Brentford and Isleworth	7 May 2015	14/05/1959	
619	Carolyn Harris	Lab	Swansea East	7 May 2015	18/09/1960	
620	Christina Rees	Lab	Neath	7 May 2015	21/02/1954	
621	Tania Mathias	C	Twickenham	7 May 2015	21/06/1964	
622	Mary Robinson	C	Cheadle	7 May 2015	23/08/1955	
623	Alex Chalk	C	Cheltenham	7 May 2015	08/08/1976	
624	Ruth Smeeth	Lab	Stoke-on-Trent North	7 May 2015	29/06/1979	
625	Wes Streeting	Lab	Ilford North	7 May 2015	21/01/1983	
626	Peter Kyle	Lab	Hove	7 May 2015	09/09/1970	
627	Rob Marris	Lab	Wolverhampton South West	7 May 2015	08/04/1955	Previously served 2001–2010.
628	Rishi Sunak	C	Richmond (Yorks)	7 May 2015	12/05/1980	
629	Calum Kerr	SNP	Berwickshire, Roxburgh and Selkirk	7 May 2015	05/04/1972	
630	Kelly Tolhurst	C	Rochester and Strood	7 May 2015	23/08/1978	
631	Craig Mackinlay	C	South Thanet	7 May 2015	07/10/1966	
632	The Hon. Stephen Kinnock	Lab	Aberavon	7 May 2015	01/01/1970	
633	Martin Docherty	SNP	West Dunbartonshire	7 May 2015	21/01/1971	
634	Jeremy Quin	C	Horsham	7 May 2015	24/09/1968	
635	Caroline Ansell	C	Eastbourne	7 May 2015	12/01/1971	
636	Neil Coyle	Lab	Bermondsey and Old Southwark	7 May 2015	30/12/1978	
637	William Wragg	C	Hazel Grove	7 May 2015	11/12/1987	
638	James Davies	C	Vale of Clwyd	7 May 2015	27/02/1980	
639	Peter Grant	SNP	Glenrothes	7 May 2015	12/10/1960	
640	Heidi Allen	C	South Cambridgeshire	7 May 2015	18/01/1975	
641	Michelle Donelan	C	Chippenham	7 May 2015	08/04/1984	
642	Gavin Newlands	SNP	Paisley and Renfrewshire North	7 May 2015	02/02/1980	
643	Derek Thomas	C	St Ives	7 May 2015	20/07/1972	
644	David Warburton	C	Somerton and Frome	7 May 2015	28/10/1965	
645	Gavin Robinson	DUP	Belfast East	7 May 2015	22/11/1984	
646	The Rt Hon. Boris Johnson	C	Uxbridge and South Ruislip	7 May 2015	19/06/1964	Previously served 2001–2008.
647	Jim McMahon	Lab	Oldham West and Royton	3 December 2015	07/07/1980	
648	Gill Furniss	Lab	Sheffield Brightside and Hillsborough	5 May 2016	14/03/1957	
649	Christopher Elmore	Lab	Ogmore	5 May 2016	23/12/1983	
650	Rosena Allin-Khan	Lab	Tooting	16 June 2016	10/05/1978	
651	Tracy Brabin	Lab	Batley and Spen	20 October 2016	09/05/1961	
652	Robert Courts	C	Witney	20 October 2016	21/10/1978	
653	Sarah Olney	LD	Richmond Park	1 December 2016	11/01/1977	
654	Caroline Johnson	C	Sleaford and North Hykeham	8 December 2016	31/12/1977	
655	Gareth Snell	Lab	Stoke-on-Trent Central	23 February 2017	01/01/1986	
656	Trudy Harrison	C	Copeland	23 February 2017	19/04/1976	
Members who have never been sworn in
–	Pat Doherty	SF	West Tyrone	7 June 2001	18/07/1945	
–	Paul Maskey	SF	Belfast West	9 June 2011	10/06/1967	
–	Francie Molloy	SF	Mid Ulster	7 March 2013	16/12/1950	
–	Mickey Brady	SF	Newry and Armagh	7 May 2015	07/10/1950	

== See also ==
- List of MPs elected in the 2015 United Kingdom general election
- List of United Kingdom by-elections (2010–present)
