= 2026 Aberdeen South by-election =

UK parliamentary by-election

- 18 June 2026

Aberdeen South constituency
- Registered: 76,033
- Turnout: 28,897; 38.0% (▼21.9 pp)
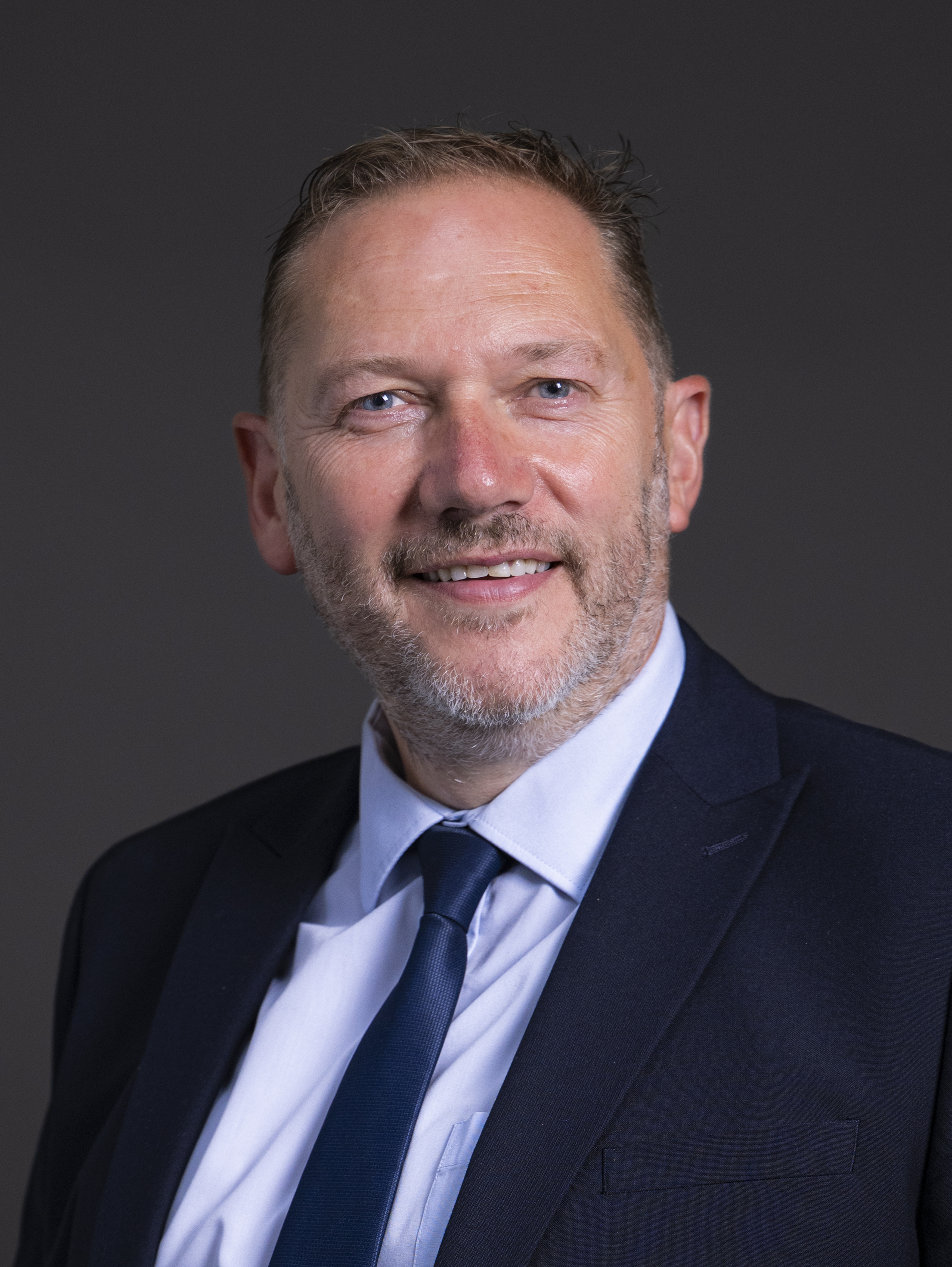

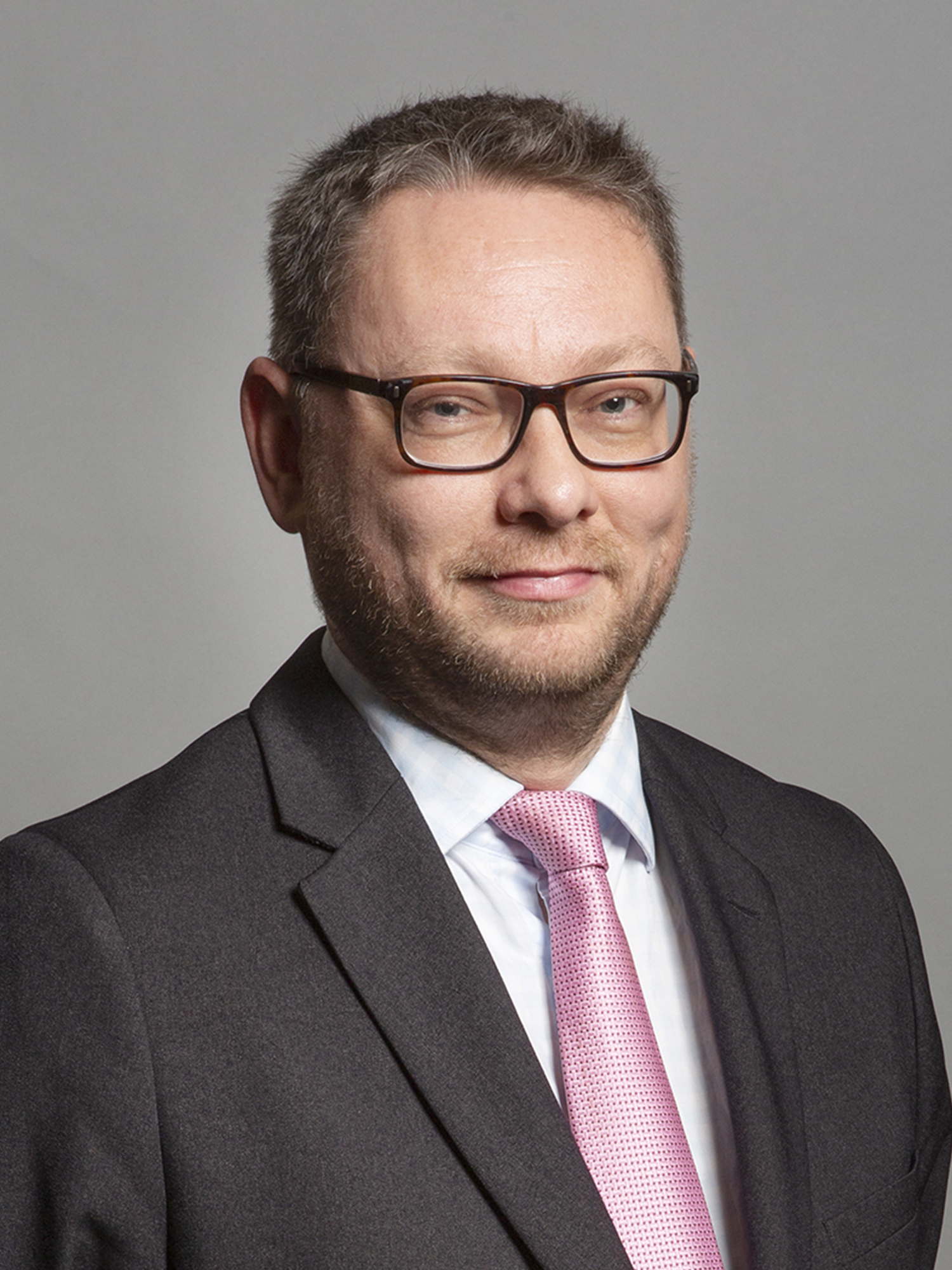
	First party	Second party
Candidate	Douglas Lumsden	Richard Thomson
Party	Conservative	SNP
Popular vote	14,308	8,258
Percentage	49.5%	28.6%
Swing	▲25.1 pp	▼4.3 pp
	Third party	Fourth party
Candidate	Jo Hart	Nurul Hoque Ali
Party	Reform	Labour
Popular vote	2,478	1,550
Percentage	8.6%	5.4%
Swing	▲1.7 pp	▼19.4 pp
- Boundary of the Aberdeen South constituency in Scotland
MP before election
Stephen Flynn
SNP
Elected MP
Douglas Lumsden
Conservative

A by-election for the United Kingdom parliamentary constituency of Aberdeen South was held on 18 June 2026 following the resignation of Stephen Flynn, Member of Parliament (MP) for the Scottish National Party (SNP), upon being elected to the Scottish Parliament. It was won by Conservative candidate Douglas Lumsden in the party's first gain at a Scottish by-election since 1967, and the first time ever, in the UK party's history, that it had won any parliamentary by-election from third place.

Flynn resigned after having been elected as a member of the Scottish Parliament (MSP) at the 2026 Scottish Parliament election on 7 May; the Scottish Elections (Representation and Reform) Act 2025 prohibits individuals from serving simultaneously as an MP and an MSP.

The vote was one of three Westminster by-elections taking place on the same day; the others being in Arbroath and Broughty Ferry and in Makerfield.

== Background ==
The by-election occurred on the same day as UK parliamentary by-elections in Arbroath and Broughty Ferry and in Makerfield. In accordance with the Scottish Elections (Representation and Reform) Act 2025, which bars individuals from simultaneously holding both Holyrood and Westminster seats, Flynn resigned his House of Commons position on 14 May 2026.

Aberdeen South was first contested at the 1885 general election. It contains southern areas in the city of Aberdeen, including the wards of George Street/Harbour, Lower Deeside, Hazlehead/Queens Cross/Countesswells, Airyhall/Broomhill/Garthdee, Torry/Ferryhill and Kincorth/Nigg/Cove.

The constituency's inhabitants are 86% ethnically White, with 67% categorised as social grades A, B and C1. The average household income is £35,675, below the average for Great Britain as a whole but above that for Scotland, and the home-ownership rate is 59%, lower than both the Scotland and Great Britain averages. In the 2016 membership referendum, in which the UK voted to leave the European Union (EU), 66% of those who voted in Aberdeen South favoured remaining in the EU.

Historically, Aberdeen South has been won by the Liberal, the Conservative and Unionist and the Labour parties. Anne Begg of Labour was elected at the 1997 general election, defeating the incumbent Conservative MP and government minister Raymond Robertson. Begg was returned in 2001, 2005 and 2010. At the 2015 general election, Begg lost her seat to the Scottish National Party (SNP) candidate, Callum McCaig. At the 2017 general election, McCaig lost his seat in a surprise result to the Conservative candidate, Ross Thomson. Flynn defeated Thomson at the 2019 general election. At the 2024 general election, Flynn was returned as MP for Aberdeen South, one of only nine seats to elect an SNP candidate. Flynn had a majority of 3,758 votes. He returned as Leader of the Scottish National Party in the House of Commons. At the 2026 Scottish Parliament election, he was elected MSP for Aberdeen Deeside and North Kincardine.

== Candidates ==
=== Alliance for Democracy and Freedom ===
David Ballantine was the Alliance for Democracy and Freedom candidate. He came sixth in Hamilton, Larkhall and Stonehouse at the 2026 Scottish Parliament election and earlier stood in Edinburgh South West for the Brexit Party at the 2019 general election, again coming sixth.

=== Conservative ===
On 12 May Douglas Lumsden, a Conservative MSP for North East Scotland who had returned to the Scottish Parliament, announced his intention to contest the by-election, and he was selected by Aberdeen Conservatives as their candidate on 15 May. He publicly urged Reform UK supporters to back him in a tactical vote. At the 2026 Scottish Parliament election, the Conservatives finished 1,244 votes behind the SNP in the overlapping seat of Aberdeen Deeside and North Kincardine, with Reform UK third.

=== Labour ===
On 22 May Scottish Labour announced Nurul Hoque Ali as its candidate for the by-election. He contested Gordon and Buchan at the 2024 general election, finishing fourth, and represents the Bridge of Don ward on Aberdeen City Council.

=== Liberal Democrats ===
On 22 May, the Scottish Liberal Democrats announced that Mel Sullivan would be their candidate for the by-election. Sullivan is a councillor for North Kincardine and was the party's candidate for Aberdeen Deeside and North Kincardine in the 2026 Scottish Parliament election.

=== Reform UK ===
On 18 May Reform UK announced Jo Hart, a former nurse, as its candidate. Hart had stood at the 2026 Scottish Parliament election for Aberdeenshire West, coming third behind the Conservatives and SNP. She also stood at the 2024 general election in Aberdeenshire North and Moray East, again coming third behind the SNP and Conservatives. Hart previously attracted controversy from past comments criticising the British royal family, which include her describing them as "benefits scroungers", as well as for comments concerning 5G masts.

=== Scottish Greens ===
On 22 May the Scottish Greens announced Jorg Shelton-Eckstein as their candidate.

=== Scottish National Party ===
On 18 May Richard Thomson, former SNP MP for Gordon, announced his candidacy for the by-election. Thomson served as MP for Gordon from 2019 until 2024, when he was defeated by the Conservative Harriet Cross in the new constituency of Gordon and Buchan. Thomson unsuccessfully attempted to stand as an SNP candidate at the 2026 Scottish Parliament election, seeking the nomination for Angus North and Mearns. On 20 May Thomson was announced as the party's candidate.

== Campaign ==
The by-election campaign had been described as a "referendum" on the oil and gas industry. Kemi Badenoch, the leader of the Conservative Party, visited Aberdeen on three separate occasions during the campaign period to support the party's candidate, Douglas Lumsden. The SNP's campaign was reportedly negatively impacted by Operation Branchform.

== Result ==
2026 Aberdeen South by-election
Party	Candidate	Votes	%	±%
Conservative	Douglas Lumsden	14,308	49.5	+25.1
SNP	Richard Thomson	8,258	28.6	−4.3
Reform	Jo Hart	2,478	8.6	+1.7
Labour	Nurul Hoque Ali	1,550	5.4	−19.4
Liberal Democrats	Mel Sullivan	1,270	4.4	−1.9
Green	Jorg Shelton-Eckstein	974	3.4	−0.1
ADF	David Ballantine	59	0.2	New
Rejected ballots		53	0.18	
Majority		6,050	20.9	N/A
Turnout		28,897	38.0	−21.9
Registered electors		76,033		
Conservative gain from SNP		Swing	+14.7	

== Previous result ==
2024 general election: Aberdeen South
Party	Candidate	Votes	%	±%
SNP	Stephen Flynn	15,213	32.8	−12.5
Labour	M. Tauqeer Malik	11,455	24.7	+15.9
Conservative	John Wheeler	11,300	24.4	−10.0
Reform	Michael Pearce	3,199	6.9	+6.5
Liberal Democrats	Jeff Goodhall	2,921	6.3	−4.4
Green	Guy Ingerson	1,609	3.5	+3.0
Scottish Family	Graeme Craib	423	0.9	N/A
Independent	Sophie Molly	225	0.5	N/A
Majority		3,758	8.1	−2.8
Turnout		46,345	59.9	−9.5
SNP hold		Swing	−14.2	

== See also ==
- 2026 Arbroath and Broughty Ferry by-election (same day)
- 2026 Makerfield by-election (same day)
- List of United Kingdom by-elections (2024–present)
