= List of MPs elected in the 2024 United Kingdom general election =

MPs in the 59th United Kingdom House of Commons

2024–present Parliament of the United Kingdom
←	2019–2024 Parliament
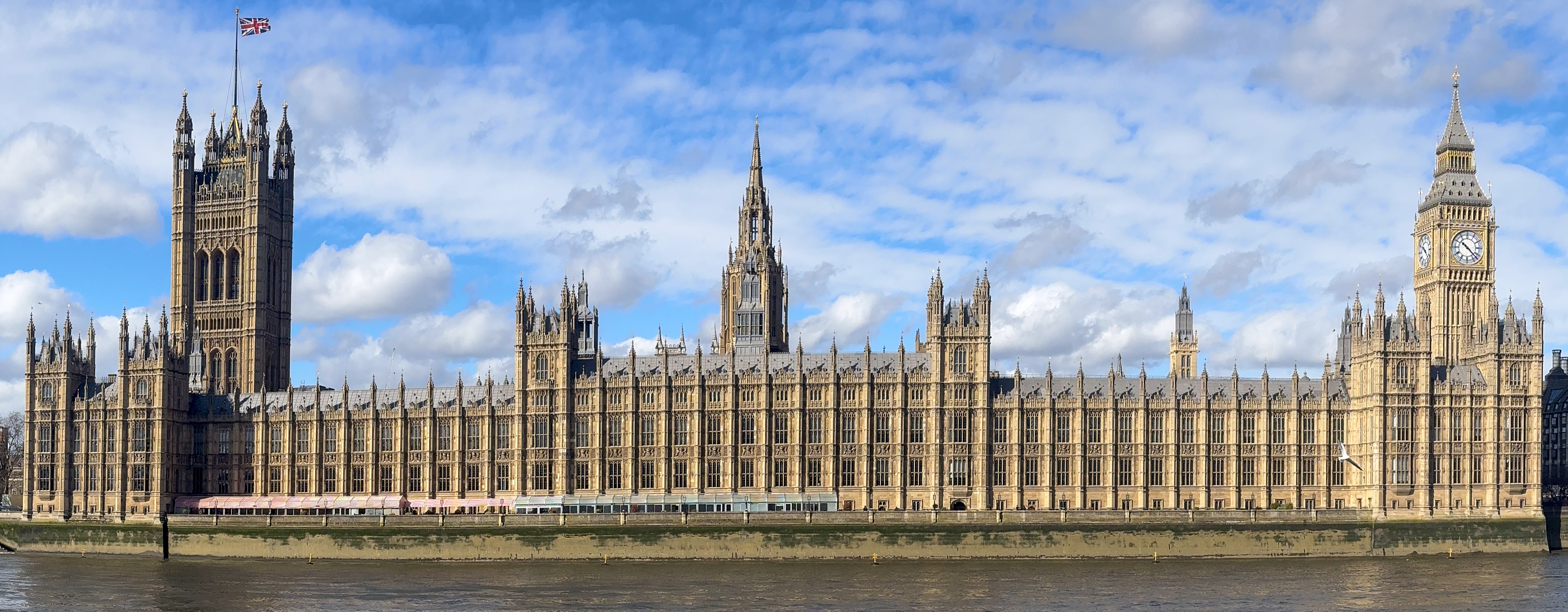
- The Palace of Westminster in 2024

Overview
- Legislative body: Parliament of the United Kingdom
- Meeting place: Palace of Westminster
- Term: 9 July 2024 –
- Election: 2024 United Kingdom general election
- Government: Burnham ministry (from 20 July 2026); Starmer ministry (until 20 July 2026)

House of Commons
- Members: 650
- Speaker: Lindsay Hoyle
- Leader: Alan Campbell (from 5 September 2025); Lucy Powell (until 5 September 2025)
- Prime Minister: Andy Burnham (from 20 July 2026); Keir Starmer (until 20 July 2026)
- Deputy Prime Minister or First Secretary of State: Louise Haigh (from 20 July 2026); David Lammy (until 20 July 2026); Angela Rayner (until 5 September 2025)
- Leader of the Opposition: Kemi Badenoch (from 2 November 2024); Rishi Sunak (until 2 November 2024)
- Third-party leader: Ed Davey

House of Lords
- Members: 783
- Lord Speaker: The Lord Forsyth of Drumlean
- Leader: The Baroness Smith of Basildon
- Leader of the Opposition: The Lord True
- Third-party leader: The Lord Purvis

Crown-in-Parliament King Charles III

Sessions
- 1st: 9 July 2024 – 29 April 2026
- 2nd: 13 May 2026 –

In the United Kingdom's 2024 general election, 650 members of Parliament were elected to the country's House of Commons – one for each parliamentary constituency.

The UK Parliament consists of the elected House of Commons, the House of Lords, and the Sovereign. The new Parliament first met on 9 July 2024. Of the 650 MPs elected, more than half (335) were new to Parliament.

== House of Commons composition ==
The Conservative Party under Prime Minister Rishi Sunak lost over 240 seats and its 14-year long tenure in government. The Labour Party formed a majority government under the leadership of Keir Starmer, winning over 400 seats. Other parties including the Liberal Democrats, Reform UK and the Green Party saw an increase in their seat share in the House of Commons at expense of the Conservatives and the Scottish National Party.

This table relates to the composition of the House of Commons after the 2024 United Kingdom general election. As of 2 November 2026, it summarises the changes in party affiliation that took place during the 2024–present Parliament.

Affiliation	Members		
Affiliation	Elected in 2024	Current	Difference
Labour (Note: The Labour total includes 43 MPs elected in 2024 (43 current MPs as at 19 June 2026) who are sponsored by the Co-operative Party and are designated Labour and Co-operative.)	411 (Note: Some media outlets, such as BBC News, listed Labour's total as 412, by including the Speaker (who, to demonstrate his neutrality, had resigned his Labour Party membership on taking office).)	404 (Note: Includes one deputy speaker) (Note: The Speaker and three deputy speakers by convention comprise two MPs from the government side and two from the opposition side. They do not vote in House of Commons divisions and exercise only a casting vote.)	▼7
Conservative	121	118 (Note: Includes two deputy speakers)	▼3
Liberal Democrats	72	71	▼1
SNP	9	8	▼1
Reform	5	8	▲3
Sinn Féin (Note: Sinn Féin's seven MPs follow a policy of abstentionism. They do not swear into the House of Commons, and do not take part in its formal processes. As a result, they are not able to sit or vote in the House of Commons.)	7	7	Steady
Green (E&W)	4	5	▲1
DUP	5	4	▼1
Plaid Cymru	4	4	Steady
Ind. Alliance (Note: Independent politicians affiliated to the Independent Alliance group of MPs. Some sources group Independent Alliance MPs with other independent MPs, instead of treating the Independent Alliance as a separate group.)	–	4	▲4
SDLP	2	2	Steady
Your Party	–	2	▲2
Alliance	1	1	Steady
UUP	1	1	Steady
TUV	1	1	Steady
Restore	–	1	▲1
Speaker	1	1	Steady
Independent (Note: Unaffiliated independent politicians)	6	8	▲2
Total MPs	650	650	Steady
Total voting	639	639	Steady
Government majority (Note: Total number of MPs on the government side minus MPs on the opposition side. The government side comprises all Labour MPs. The opposition side comprises all other MPs (except the Speaker).)	173	159	▼14
Working majority (Note: Total number of voting MPs on the government side minus voting MPs on the opposition side)	181	167	▼14

For full details of changes during the 2024–present Parliament, see By-elections and Defections, suspensions and resignations.

Composition of the House of Commons after the election

== MPs defeated and elected ==
The table below shows the movement of the number of MPs from the dissolution of the 2019–2024 parliament to those elected at the 2024 general election.

Affiliation	From 2019 to 2024		Candidacy		Lost	Elected			
Affiliation	Elected in 2019	At dissolution	Did not stand	Stood	Lost	Held	Returning	New	Total
Labour	202 (Note: Includes 26 Co-operative Party MPs, as part of the Labour-Co-op alliance)	205	33	172	4	168	12	231	411 (Note: Includes 43 Co-operative Party MPs, as part of the Labour-Co-op alliance)
Conservative	365	344	74	270	175	95	–	26	121
Liberal Democrats	11	15	–	15	–	15	2	55	72
SNP	48	43	9	34	28	6	1	2	9
Sinn Féin	7	7	3	4	–	4	–	3	7
Independent	–	17	11	6	5	1	–	5	6
DUP	8	7	–	7	2	5	–	–	5
Reform	–	1	–	1	–	1	–	4	5
Green (E&W)	1	1	1	–	–	–	–	4	4
Plaid Cymru	4	3	1	2	–	2	–	2	4
SDLP	2	2	–	2	–	2	–	–	2
Alliance (NI)	1	1	–	1	1	–	–	1	1
TUV	–	–	–	–	–	–	–	1	1
UUP	–	–	–	–	–	–	–	1	1
Speaker	1	1	–	1	–	1	–	–	1
Alba	–	2	–	2	2	–	–	–	–
Workers Party	–	1	–	1	1	–	–	–	–
Total	650	650	132	518	218	300	15	335	650

== List of MPs elected ==
Constituency	Affiliation in notional (Note: I.e., if election in 2019 were held using 2024 constituency boundaries) 2019 election	Member returned in 2024		Notes
Constituency	Affiliation in notional 2019 election	Name and picture	Affiliation	Notes
Aberafan Maesteg	Labour	Stephen Kinnock	Labour	MP for predecessor seat of Aberavon. Secretary of State for Wales (20 July 2026 – present) Minister of State for Care (8 July 2024 - 20 July 2026)
Aberdeen North	Scottish National	Kirsty Blackman	Scottish National	Chief Whip of SNP in the House of Commons (5 July 2024 - Present) SNP Spokesperson for the Equalities in the House of Commons (10 July 2024 - Present)
Aberdeen South	Scottish National	Stephen Flynn	Scottish National	Resigned on 14 May 2026
Aberdeenshire North and Moray East	Conservative	Seamus Logan	Scottish National	Defeated Douglas Ross, previously Conservative MP for Moray. David Duguid, incumbent for the predecessor seat of Banff and Buchan, did not stand
Airdrie and Shotts	Scottish National	Kenneth Stevenson	Labour	Defeated incumbent Anum Qaisar
Aldershot	Conservative	Alex Baker	Labour	Defeated incumbent Leo Docherty
Aldridge-Brownhills	Conservative	Wendy Morton	Conservative	Shadow Minister for Development (6 November 2024 - Present)
Alloa and Grangemouth	Scottish National	Brian Leishman	Labour	Defeated John Nicolson, incumbent MP for the predecessor seat of Ochil and South Perthshire
Altrincham and Sale West	Conservative	Connor Rand	Labour	Previous incumbent Graham Brady did not stand
Alyn and Deeside	Labour	Mark Tami	Labour	Govenrment Deputy Chief Whip Treasurer of the Household (10 July 2024 - Present)
Amber Valley	Conservative	Linsey Farnsworth	Labour	Defeated incumbent Nigel Mills
Angus and Perthshire Glens	Scottish National	Dave Doogan	Scottish National	MP for the predecessor seat of Angus. Leader of the House of Commons for the SNP (12 May 2026 - Present): SNP Spokesperson for Economy (10 July 2024 - Present); SNP Spokesperson for Defence (10 July 2024 - Present)
Arbroath and Broughty Ferry	Scottish National	Stephen Gethins	Scottish National Party	Previous incumbent MP Stewart Hosie did not stand. Gethins was previously MP for North East Fife 2015–2019.
Argyll, Bute and South Lochaber	Scottish National	Brendan O'Hara	Scottish National Party	MP for predecessor seat of Argyll and Bute
Arundel and South Downs	Conservative	Andrew Griffith	Conservative	Shadow Chancellor of the Exchequer (31 August 2026 - Present) Shadow Secretary of State for Business and Trade (5 November 2024 – 31 August 2026) Shadow Secretary of State for Science, Innovation and Technology (8 July 2024 – 5 November 2024)
Ashfield	Conservative	Lee Anderson	Reform UK	Anderson retained seat. He was elected as a Conservative MP in 2019 and defected to Reform UK in March 2024, following his suspension from the Conservative Party. Chairman of Reform UK (18 May 2026 - Present) Chief Whip of Reform UK in the House of Commons (11 July 2024 - Present)
Ashford	Conservative	Sojan Joseph	Labour	Defeated incumbent Damian Green
Ashton-under-Lyne	Labour	Angela Rayner	Labour	Secretary of State for Housing, Communities and Local Government (20 July 2026 – present) (5 July 2024 – 5 September 2025) Deputy Prime Minister (5 July 2024 – 5 September 2025)
Aylesbury	Conservative	Laura Kyrke-Smith	Labour	Defeated incumbent Rob Butler
Ayr, Carrick and Cumnock	Scottish National	Elaine Stewart	Labour	Defeated incumbent Allan Dorans
Banbury	Conservative	Sean Woodcock	Labour	Defeated incumbent Victoria Prentis
Bangor Aberconwy	Conservative	Claire Hughes	Labour	Defeated Robin Millar, incumbent for the predecessor seat of Aberconwy Parliamentary Under-Secretary of State for Wales (16 September 2025 - Incumbent)
Barking	Labour	Nesil Caliskan	Labour	Previous incumbent Margaret Hodge did not stand Parliamentary Under-Secretary of State for Devolution, Local Growth and Communities (12 May 2026 – 22 July 2026) Comptroller of the Household (7 September 2025 – 12 May 2026)
Barnsley North	Labour	Dan Jarvis	Labour	Minister of State for Security (6 September 2025 – 11 June 2026; 21 July 2026 - Incumbent) Secretary of State for Defence (11 June 2026 – 20 July 2026) Ministers of State at the Cabinet Office (6 September 2025 – 11 June 2026)
Barnsley South	Labour	Stephanie Peacock	Labour	Parliamentary Under-Secretary of State for Sport, Tourism, Place and Digital Government (9 July 2024 - Incumbent)
Barrow and Furness	Conservative	Michelle Scrogham	Labour	Defeated incumbent Simon Fell
Basildon and Billericay	Conservative	Richard Holden	Conservative	Formerly MP for North West Durham. Previous incumbent John Baron did not stand Shadow Secretary of State for Transport (22 July 2025 - Incumbent) Shadow Paymaster General (8 November 2024 – 22 July 2025)
Basingstoke	Conservative	Luke Murphy	Labour	Defeated incumbent Maria Miller
Bassetlaw	Conservative	Jo White	Labour	Defeated incumbent Brendan Clarke-Smith Parliamentary Under-Secretary of State for Migration and Citizenship (22 July 2026 - Incumbent)
Bath	Liberal Democrats	Wera Hobhouse	Liberal Democrats	
Bathgate and Linlithgow	Scottish National	Kirsteen Sullivan	Labour Co-op	Gain. Defeated Martyn Day, incumbent MP for predecessor seat of Linlithgow and East Falkirk
Battersea	Labour	Marsha de Cordova	Labour	Second Church Estates Commissioner (7 October 2024 - Incumbent)
Beaconsfield	Conservative	Joy Morrissey	Conservative	Shadow Minister for Women and Equalities (31 August 2026 - Incumbent) Opposition Deputy Chief Whip in the House of Commons (6 November 2024 – 31 August 2026) Shadow Minister for Energy Security and Net Zero (19 July 2024 – 6 November 2024) Opposition Whip (19 July 2024 – 6 November 2024)
Beckenham and Penge	Labour	Liam Conlon	Labour	Notional hold following boundary changes. Bob Stewart, Conservative incumbent for the predecessor seat of Beckenham, did not stand.
Bedford	Labour	Mohammad Yasin	Labour	
Belfast East	Democratic Unionist	Gavin Robinson	Democratic Unionist	Leader of the Democratic Unionist Party (29 May 2024 - Incumbent) Leader of the Democratic Unionist Party in the House of Commons (29 March 2024 - Incumbent)
Belfast North	Sinn Féin	John Finucane	Sinn Féin	
Belfast South and Mid Down	Social Democratic and Labour	Claire Hanna	Social Democratic and Labour	MP for predecessor seat of Belfast South.
Belfast West	Sinn Féin	Paul Maskey	Sinn Féin	
Bermondsey and Old Southwark	Labour	Neil Coyle	Labour	
Berwickshire, Roxburgh and Selkirk	Conservative	John Lamont	Conservative	
Bethnal Green and Stepney	Labour	Rushanara Ali	Labour	MP for predecessor seat of Bethnal Green and Bow
Beverley and Holderness	Conservative	Graham Stuart	Conservative	
Bexhill and Battle	Conservative	Kieran Mullan	Conservative	Formerly MP for Crewe and Nantwich. Previous incumbent Huw Merriman did not stand.
Bexleyheath and Crayford	Conservative	Daniel Francis	Labour	Previous incumbent David Evennett did not stand
Bicester and Woodstock	Conservative	Calum Miller	Liberal Democrats	New seat
Birkenhead	Labour	Alison McGovern	Labour	Formerly MP for abolished seat of Wirral South. Previous incumbent Mick Whitley did not stand.
Birmingham Edgbaston	Labour	Preet Gill	Labour Co-op	
Birmingham Erdington	Labour	Paulette Hamilton	Labour	Elected at 2022 by-election
Birmingham Hall Green and Moseley	Labour	Tahir Ali	Labour	MP for predecessor seat of Birmingham Hall Green
Birmingham Hodge Hill and Solihull North	Labour	Liam Byrne	Labour	MP for predecessor seat of Birmingham Hodge Hill
Birmingham Ladywood	Labour	Shabana Mahmood	Labour	Lord Chancellor, Secretary of State for Justice (5 July 2024 – 5 September 2025); Secretary of State for the Home Department (5 September 2025 – present)
Birmingham Northfield	Conservative	Laurence Turner	Labour	Defeated incumbent Gary Sambrook
Birmingham Perry Barr	Labour	Ayoub Khan	Independent	Defeated incumbent Khalid Mahmood
Birmingham Selly Oak	Labour	Alistair Carns	Labour	Previous incumbent Steve McCabe did not stand
Birmingham Yardley	Labour	Jess Phillips	Labour	
Bishop Auckland	Conservative	Sam Rushworth	Labour	Previous incumbent Dehenna Davison did not stand
Blackburn	Labour	Adnan Hussain	Independent	Defeated incumbent Kate Hollern
Blackley and Middleton South	Labour	Graham Stringer	Labour	MP for predecessor seat of Blackley and Broughton
Blackpool North and Fleetwood	Conservative	Lorraine Beavers	Labour	Gain. Defeated Paul Maynard, incumbent for predecessor seat of Blackpool North and Cleveleys
Blackpool South	Conservative	Chris Webb	Labour	Won by Labour at 2024 by-election
Blaenau Gwent and Rhymney	Labour	Nick Smith	Labour	
Blaydon and Consett	Labour	Liz Twist	Labour	Previously MP for the abolished seat of Blaydon. Incumbent of the predecessor seat of North West Durham, Conservative MP Richard Holden, stood successfully in Basildon and Billericay.
Blyth and Ashington	Labour	Ian Lavery	Labour	MP for predecessor seat of Wansbeck.
Bognor Regis and Littlehampton	Conservative	Alison Griffiths	Conservative	Previous incumbent Nick Gibb did not stand
Bolsover	Conservative	Natalie Fleet	Labour	Defeated incumbent Mark Fletcher
Bolton North East	Conservative	Kirith Entwistle	Labour	Previous incumbent MP Mark Logan did not stand
Bolton South and Walkden	Labour	Yasmin Qureshi	Labour	MP for predecessor seat of Bolton South East
Bolton West	Conservative	Phil Brickell	Labour	Defeated incumbent Chris Green
Bootle	Labour	Peter Dowd	Labour	
Boston and Skegness	Conservative	Richard Tice	Reform UK	Defeated incumbent Matt Warman
Bournemouth East	Conservative	Tom Hayes	Labour	Defeated incumbent Tobias Ellwood
Bournemouth West	Conservative	Jessica Toale	Labour	Defeated incumbent Conor Burns
Bracknell	Conservative	Peter Swallow	Labour	Defeated incumbent James Sunderland
Bradford East	Labour	Imran Hussain	Labour	
Bradford South	Labour	Judith Cummins	Labour	
Bradford West	Labour	Naz Shah	Labour	
Braintree	Conservative	James Cleverly	Conservative	
Brecon, Radnor and Cwm Tawe	Conservative	David Chadwick	Liberal Democrats	Defeated Fay Jones, incumbent MP for predecessor seat of Brecon and Radnorshire
Brent East	Labour	Dawn Butler	Labour	MP for predecessor seat of Brent Central
Brent West	Labour	Barry Gardiner	Labour	MP for predecessor seat of Brent North
Brentford and Isleworth	Labour	Ruth Cadbury	Labour	
Brentwood and Ongar	Conservative	Alex Burghart	Conservative	
Bridgend	Conservative	Chris Elmore	Labour	Formerly MP for the abolished seat of Ogmore. Previous incumbent Jamie Wallis did not stand.
Bridgwater	Conservative	Ashley Fox	Conservative	Ian Liddell-Grainger, incumbent MP for the predecessor seat of Bridgwater and West Somerset, was defeated in Tiverton and Minehead
Bridlington and The Wolds	Conservative	Charlie Dewhirst	Conservative	Greg Knight, incumbent MP for the predecessor seat of East Yorkshire, did not stand
Brigg and Immingham	Conservative	Martin Vickers	Conservative	MP for the predecessor seat of Cleethorpes.
Brighton Kemptown and Peacehaven	Labour	Chris Ward	Labour	Previous incumbent Lloyd Russell-Moyle did not stand
Brighton Pavilion	Green	Siân Berry	Green	Previous incumbent Caroline Lucas did not stand
Bristol Central	Labour	Carla Denyer	Green	Defeated Thangam Debbonaire, incumbent MP for the predecessor seat of Bristol West
Bristol East	Labour	Kerry McCarthy	Labour	
Bristol North East	Labour	Damien Egan	Labour	New seat. Elected for the abolished seat of Kingswood at 2024 by-election
Bristol North West	Labour	Darren Jones	Labour	Chief Secretary to the Treasury (5 July 2024 – 1 September 2025); Chief Secretary to the Prime Minister (1 September 2025 – 20 July 2026); Chancellor of the Duchy of Lancaster (6 September 2025 – 20 July 2026); Minister for Intergovernmental Relations (6 September 2025 – 20 July 2026)
Bristol South	Labour	Karin Smyth	Labour	
Broadland and Fakenham	Conservative	Jerome Mayhew	Conservative	
Bromley and Biggin Hill	Conservative	Peter Fortune	Conservative	Bob Neill, incumbent MP for the predecessor seat of Bromley and Chislehurst, did not stand
Bromsgrove	Conservative	Bradley Thomas	Conservative	Previous incumbent Sajid Javid did not stand
Broxbourne	Conservative	Lewis Cocking	Conservative	Previous incumbent Charles Walker did not stand
Broxtowe	Conservative	Juliet Campbell	Labour	Defeated incumbent Darren Henry
Buckingham and Bletchley	Conservative	Callum Anderson	Labour	Defeated contesting Conservative MP Iain Stewart (previously MP for Milton Keynes South). Incumbent MP for the predecessor seat of Buckingham, Greg Smith, stood successfully in the new seat of Mid Buckinghamshire.
Burnley	Conservative	Oliver Ryan	Labour Co-op	Defeated incumbent Antony Higginbotham
Burton and Uttoxeter	Conservative	Jacob Collier	Labour	Defeated incumbent Kate Kniveton
Bury North	Conservative	James Frith	Labour	Defeated incumbent James Daly
Bury South	Conservative	Christian Wakeford	Labour	Wakeford retained the seat. He was elected as a Conservative MP in 2019 and defected to Labour in 2022.
Bury St Edmunds and Stowmarket	Conservative	Peter Prinsley	Labour	Jo Churchill, incumbent MP for the predecessor seat of Bury St Edmunds, did not stand
Caerfyrddin	Conservative	Ann Davies	Plaid Cymru	Defeated Simon Hart, incumbent for Carmarthen West and South Pembrokeshire
Caerphilly	Labour	Chris Evans	Labour Co-op	Previously MP for Islwyn. Previous incumbent, Wayne David, did not stand.
Caithness, Sutherland and Easter Ross	Scottish National	Jamie Stone	Liberal Democrats	Seat held (Notional gain following boundary changes)
Calder Valley	Conservative	Josh Fenton-Glynn	Labour	Previous incumbent, Craig Whittaker, did not stand
Camborne and Redruth	Conservative	Perran Moon	Labour	Previous incumbent, George Eustice, did not stand
Cambridge	Labour	Daniel Zeichner	Labour	
Cannock Chase	Conservative	Josh Newbury	Labour	Defeated incumbent Amanda Milling
Canterbury	Labour	Rosie Duffield	Labour	Currently sits as an independent following her resignation from the Labour Party in September 2024
Cardiff East	Labour	Jo Stevens	Labour	MP for predecessor seat of Cardiff Central Secretary of State for Wales (5 July 2024 – 20 July 2026)
Cardiff North	Labour	Anna McMorrin	Labour	
Cardiff South and Penarth	Labour	Stephen Doughty	Labour Co-op	
Cardiff West	Labour	Alex Barros-Curtis	Labour	Previous incumbent, Kevin Brennan, did not stand
Carlisle	Conservative	Julie Minns	Labour	Defeated incumbent John Stevenson
Carshalton and Wallington	Conservative	Bobby Dean	Liberal Democrats	Defeated incumbent Elliot Colburn
Castle Point	Conservative	Rebecca Harris	Conservative	
Central Ayrshire	Scottish National	Alan Gemmell	Labour	Previous incumbent, Philippa Whitford, did not stand
Central Devon	Conservative	Mel Stride	Conservative	
Central Suffolk and North Ipswich	Conservative	Patrick Spencer	Conservative	Previous incumbent, Dan Poulter, who defected to Labour in April 2024, did not stand
Ceredigion Preseli	Plaid Cymru	Ben Lake	Plaid Cymru	MP for predecessor seat of Ceredigion
Chatham and Aylesford	Conservative	Tris Osborne	Labour	Previous incumbent, Tracey Crouch, did not stand
Cheadle	Conservative	Tom Morrison	Liberal Democrats	Defeated incumbent Mary Robinson
Chelmsford	Conservative	Marie Goldman	Liberal Democrats	Defeated incumbent Vicky Ford
Chelsea and Fulham	Conservative	Ben Coleman	Labour	Defeated incumbent Greg Hands
Cheltenham	Conservative	Max Wilkinson	Liberal Democrats	Defeated incumbent Alex Chalk
Chesham and Amersham	Conservative	Sarah Green	Liberal Democrats	Won by Liberal Democrats at 2021 by-election
Chester North and Neston	Labour	Samantha Dixon	Labour	MP for predecessor seat of City of Chester
Chester South and Eddisbury	Conservative	Aphra Brandreth	Conservative	Edward Timpson, previous incumbent for the predecessor seat of Eddisbury, did not stand
Chesterfield	Labour	Toby Perkins	Labour	
Chichester	Conservative	Jess Brown-Fuller	Liberal Democrats	Defeated incumbent Gillian Keegan
Chingford and Woodford Green	Conservative	Iain Duncan Smith	Conservative	
Chippenham	Conservative	Sarah Gibson	Liberal Democrats	Previous incumbent, Michelle Donelan, unsuccessfully contested the new seat of Melksham and Devizes
Chipping Barnet	Conservative	Dan Tomlinson	Labour	Defeated incumbent Theresa Villiers
Chorley	Speaker	Lindsay Hoyle	Speaker	Seat held
Christchurch	Conservative	Christopher Chope	Conservative	
Cities of London and Westminster	Conservative	Rachel Blake	Labour Co-op	Previous incumbent, Nickie Aiken, did not stand
City of Durham	Labour	Mary Foy	Labour	
Clacton	Conservative	Nigel Farage	Reform UK	Defeated incumbent Giles Watling
Clapham and Brixton Hill	Labour	Bell Ribeiro-Addy	Labour	MP for predecessor seat of Streatham
Clwyd East	Conservative	Becky Gittins	Labour	Defeated Rob Roberts, incumbent for the predecessor seat of Delyn who stood as an independent, having been elected as a Conservative in 2019. Also defeated James Davies, previously MP for the abolished constituency of Vale of Clwyd.
Clwyd North	Conservative	Gill German	Labour	Previous incumbent for the predecessor seat of Clwyd West, David Jones, did not stand
Coatbridge and Bellshill	Scottish National	Frank McNally	Labour	Defeated incumbent Steven Bonnar
Colchester	Conservative	Pam Cox	Labour	Previous incumbent, Will Quince, did not stand
Colne Valley	Conservative	Paul Davies	Labour	Defeated incumbent, Jason McCartney
Congleton	Conservative	Sarah Russell	Labour	Defeated incumbent, Fiona Bruce
Corby and East Northamptonshire	Conservative	Lee Barron	Labour	Defeated incumbent, Tom Pursglove
Coventry East	Labour	Mary Creagh	Labour	Previous incumbent, Colleen Fletcher, did not stand
Coventry North West	Labour	Taiwo Owatemi	Labour	
Coventry South	Labour	Zarah Sultana	Labour	
Cowdenbeath and Kirkcaldy	Scottish National	Melanie Ward	Labour	Defeated incumbent, Neale Hanvey
Cramlington and Killingworth	Labour	Emma Foody	Labour Co-op	Defeated Ian Levy, incumbent Conservative MP for the predecessor seat of Blyth Valley (notional hold following boundary changes)
Crawley	Conservative	Peter Lamb	Labour	Previous incumbent, Henry Smith, did not stand
Crewe and Nantwich	Conservative	Connor Naismith	Labour	Previous incumbent, Kieran Mullan, stood successfully in Bexhill and Battle
Croydon East	Labour	Natasha Irons	Labour	Sarah Jones, previous incumbent in the predecessor seat of Croydon Central, stood successfully in Croydon West.
Croydon South	Conservative	Chris Philp	Conservative	
Croydon West	Labour	Sarah Jones	Labour	Previously MP for Croydon Central. Incumbent for the predecessor seat of Croydon North, Steve Reed, stood successfully in the new seat of Streatham and Croydon North.
Cumbernauld and Kirkintilloch	Scottish National	Katrina Murray	Labour	Defeated incumbent, Stuart McDonald
Dagenham and Rainham	Labour	Margaret Mullane	Labour	Previous incumbent, Jon Cruddas, did not stand
Darlington	Conservative	Lola McEvoy	Labour	Defeated incumbent, Peter Gibson
Dartford	Conservative	Jim Dickson	Labour	Defeated incumbent, Gareth Johnson
Daventry	Conservative	Stuart Andrew	Conservative	Moved constituencies – formerly MP for Pudsey. Previous incumbent, Chris Heaton-Harris, did not stand
Derby North	Conservative	Catherine Atkinson	Labour	Defeated incumbent, Amanda Solloway
Derby South	Labour	Baggy Shanker	Labour Co-op	Previous incumbent, Margaret Beckett, did not stand
Derbyshire Dales	Conservative	John Whitby	Labour	Defeated incumbent, Sarah Dines
Dewsbury and Batley	Labour	Iqbal Mohamed	Independent	Notional Labour seat in 2019 following boundary changes. Mark Eastwood, Conservative incumbent for the predecessor constituency of Dewsbury, stood unsuccessfully in Ossett and Denby Dale.
Didcot and Wantage	Conservative	Olly Glover	Liberal Democrats	Defeated incumbent, David Johnston
Doncaster Central	Labour	Sally Jameson	Labour Co-op	Previous incumbent, Rosie Winterton, did not stand
Doncaster East and the Isle of Axholme	Conservative	Lee Pitcher	Labour	Defeated Nick Fletcher, incumbent for the predecessor seat of Don Valley
Doncaster North	Labour	Ed Miliband	Labour	Secretary of State for Foreign, Commonwealth and Development Affairs (20 July 2026 – present); Secretary of State for Energy Security and Net Zero (5 July 2024 – 20 July 2026)
Dorking and Horley	Conservative	Chris Coghlan	Liberal Democrats	Paul Beresford, MP for the predecessor seat of Mole Valley, did not stand.
Dover and Deal	Conservative	Mike Tapp	Labour	Previous incumbent, Natalie Elphicke, who defected to Labour in May 2024, stood down
Droitwich and Evesham	Conservative	Nigel Huddleston	Conservative	MP for the predecessor seat of Mid Worcestershire
Dudley	Conservative	Sonia Kumar	Labour	Defeated Marco Longhi, incumbent for the predecessor seat of Dudley North
Dulwich and West Norwood	Labour	Helen Hayes	Labour	
Dumfries and Galloway	Conservative	John Cooper	Conservative	Previous incumbent, Alister Jack, did not stand
Dumfriesshire, Clydesdale and Tweeddale	Conservative	David Mundell	Conservative	
Dundee Central	Scottish National	Chris Law	Scottish National	MP for the predecessor seat of Dundee West
Dunfermline and Dollar	Scottish National	Graeme Downie	Labour	Douglas Chapman, MP for the predecessor seat of Dunfermline and West Fife, did not stand
Dunstable and Leighton Buzzard	Conservative	Alex Mayer	Labour	Defeated Andrew Selous, incumbent for the predecessor seat of South West Bedfordshire
Dwyfor Meirionnydd	Plaid Cymru	Liz Saville Roberts	Plaid Cymru	
Ealing Central and Acton	Labour	Rupa Huq	Labour	
Ealing North	Labour	James Murray	Labour Co-op	Secretary of State for Health and Social Care (14 May 2026 – 20 July 2026)
Ealing Southall	Labour	Deirdre Costigan	Labour	Previous incumbent, Virendra Sharma, did not stand
Earley and Woodley	Conservative	Yuan Yang	Labour	New seat
Easington	Labour	Grahame Morris	Labour	
East Antrim	Democratic Unionist	Sammy Wilson	Democratic Unionist	
East Grinstead and Uckfield	Conservative	Mims Davies	Conservative	New seat. Davies was previously MP for Mid Sussex.
East Ham	Labour	Stephen Timms	Labour	
East Hampshire	Conservative	Damian Hinds	Conservative	
East Kilbride and Strathaven	Scottish National	Joani Reid	Labour	Previous incumbent for the predecessor seat of East Kilbride, Strathaven and Lesmahagow, Lisa Cameron, who defected to the Conservative Party in 2023, did not stand
East Londonderry	Democratic Unionist	Gregory Campbell	Democratic Unionist	
East Renfrewshire	Scottish National	Blair McDougall	Labour	Defeated incumbent, Kirsten Oswald
East Surrey	Conservative	Claire Coutinho	Conservative	
East Thanet	Conservative	Polly Billington	Labour	Craig Mackinlay, incumbent for the predecessor seat of South Thanet, did not stand
East Wiltshire	Conservative	Danny Kruger	Conservative	MP for the predecessor constituency of Devizes
East Worthing and Shoreham	Conservative	Tom Rutland	Labour	Previous incumbent, Tim Loughton, did not stand
Eastbourne	Conservative	Josh Babarinde	Liberal Democrats	Defeated incumbent, Caroline Ansell
Eastleigh	Conservative	Liz Jarvis	Liberal Democrats	Previous incumbent, Paul Holmes stood in Hamble Valley
Edinburgh East and Musselburgh	Scottish National	Chris Murray	Labour	Defeated Tommy Sheppard, incumbent for the predecessor seat of Edinburgh East
Edinburgh North and Leith	Scottish National	Tracy Gilbert	Labour	Defeated incumbent, Deidre Brock
Edinburgh South	Labour	Ian Murray	Labour	Secretary of State for Scotland (5 July 2024 – 5 September 2025)
Edinburgh South West	Scottish National	Scott Arthur	Labour	Defeated incumbent, Joanna Cherry
Edinburgh West	Liberal Democrats	Christine Jardine	Liberal Democrats	
Edmonton and Winchmore Hill	Labour	Kate Osamor	Labour Co-op	MP for the predecessor seat of Edmonton
Ellesmere Port and Bromborough	Labour	Justin Madders	Labour	MP for the predecessor seat of Ellesmere Port and Neston
Eltham and Chislehurst	Conservative	Clive Efford	Labour	MP for the predecessor seat of Eltham. Notional gain following boundary changes.
Ely and East Cambridgeshire	Conservative	Charlotte Cane	Liberal Democrats	Defeated Lucy Frazer, incumbent for the predecessor seat of South East Cambridgeshire
Enfield North	Labour	Feryal Clark	Labour	
Epping Forest	Conservative	Neil Hudson	Conservative	Previous incumbent, Eleanor Laing, did not stand
Epsom and Ewell	Conservative	Helen Maguire	Liberal Democrats	Previous incumbent, Chris Grayling, did not stand
Erewash	Conservative	Adam Thompson	Labour	Defeated incumbent, Maggie Throup
Erith and Thamesmead	Labour	Abena Oppong-Asare	Labour	Seat held
Esher and Walton	Conservative	Monica Harding	Liberal Democrats	Previous incumbent, Dominic Raab, did not stand
Exeter	Labour	Steve Race	Labour	Previous incumbent, Ben Bradshaw, did not stand
Exmouth and Exeter East	Conservative	David Reed	Conservative	Simon Jupp, MP for the predecessor seat of East Devon, stood unsuccessfully in Honiton and Sidmouth
Falkirk	Scottish National	Euan Stainbank	Labour	Previous incumbent, John McNally, did not stand
Fareham and Waterlooville	Conservative	Suella Braverman	Conservative	MP for the predecessor seat of Fareham
Farnham and Bordon	Conservative	Greg Stafford	Conservative	Jeremy Hunt, MP for the predecessor seat of South West Surrey, stood successfully in the new seat of Godalming and Ash.
Faversham and Mid Kent	Conservative	Helen Whately	Conservative	
Feltham and Heston	Labour	Seema Malhotra	Labour Co-op	
Fermanagh and South Tyrone	Sinn Féin	Pat Cullen	Sinn Féin	Previous incumbent, Michelle Gildernew, did not stand
Filton and Bradley Stoke	Conservative	Claire Hazelgrove	Labour	Defeated incumbent, Jack Lopresti
Finchley and Golders Green	Conservative	Sarah Sackman	Labour	Previous incumbent, Mike Freer, did not stand
Folkestone and Hythe	Conservative	Tony Vaughan	Labour	Defeated incumbent, Damian Collins
Forest of Dean	Conservative	Matt Bishop	Labour	Defeated incumbent, Mark Harper
Foyle	Social Democratic and Labour	Colum Eastwood	Social Democratic and Labour	
Frome and East Somerset	Conservative	Anna Sabine	Liberal Democrats	New seat
Fylde	Conservative	Andrew Snowden	Conservative	Previous incumbent, Mark Menzies, did not stand
Gainsborough	Conservative	Edward Leigh	Conservative	
Gateshead Central and Whickham	Labour	Mark Ferguson	Labour	Ian Mearns, incumbent for the predecessor seat of Gateshead, did not stand
Gedling	Conservative	Michael Payne	Labour	Defeated incumbent, Tom Randall
Gillingham and Rainham	Conservative	Naushabah Khan	Labour	Defeated incumbent, Rehman Chishti
Glasgow East	Scottish National	John Grady	Labour	Defeated incumbent, David Linden
Glasgow North	Scottish National	Martin Rhodes	Labour	Defeated Alison Thewliss, previously MP for the abolished seat of Glasgow Central. Incumbent Patrick Grady did not stand.
Glasgow North East	Scottish National	Maureen Burke	Labour	Defeated incumbent, Anne McLaughlin
Glasgow South	Scottish National	Gordon McKee	Labour	Defeated incumbent, Stewart McDonald
Glasgow South West	Scottish National	Zubir Ahmed	Labour	Defeated incumbent, Chris Stephens
Glasgow West	Scottish National	Patricia Ferguson	Labour	Defeated incumbent, Carol Monaghan
Glastonbury and Somerton	Conservative	Sarah Dyke	Liberal Democrats	Predecessor seat of Somerton and Frome gained by Liberal Democrats in 2023 by-election
Glenrothes and Mid Fife	Scottish National	Richard Baker	Labour	Previous incumbent, Peter Grant, did not stand
Gloucester	Conservative	Alex McIntyre	Labour	Defeated incumbent, Richard Graham
Godalming and Ash	Conservative	Jeremy Hunt	Conservative	New seat. Hunt was previously MP for South West Surrey.
Goole and Pocklington	Conservative	David Davis	Conservative	MP for the predecessor seat of Haltemprice and Howden
Gordon and Buchan	Conservative	Harriet Cross	Conservative	Defeated Richard Thomson, incumbent SNP MP for the predecessor constituency of Gordon. Notional hold following boundary changes.
Gorton and Denton	Labour	Andrew Gwynne	Labour Co-op	Previously Labour MP for the abolished seat of Denton and Reddish.
Gosport	Conservative	Caroline Dinenage	Conservative	
Gower	Labour	Tonia Antoniazzi	Labour	
Grantham and Bourne	Conservative	Gareth Davies	Conservative	MP for the predecessor seat of Grantham and Stamford
Gravesham	Conservative	Lauren Sullivan	Labour	Defeated incumbent, Adam Holloway
Great Grimsby and Cleethorpes	Conservative	Melanie Onn	Labour	Defeated Lia Nici-Townend, incumbent for the predecessor seat of Great Grimsby.
Great Yarmouth	Conservative	Rupert Lowe	Reform UK	Previous incumbent, Brandon Lewis, did not stand
Greenwich and Woolwich	Labour	Matthew Pennycook	Labour	
Guildford	Conservative	Zöe Franklin	Liberal Democrats	Defeated incumbent, Angela Richardson
Hackney North and Stoke Newington	Labour	Diane Abbott	Labour	
Hackney South and Shoreditch	Labour	Meg Hillier	Labour Co-op	
Halesowen	Conservative	Alex Ballinger	Labour	Defeated James Morris, incumbent for the predecessor seat of Halesowen and Rowley Regis
Halifax	Labour	Kate Dearden	Labour Co-op	Incumbent Holly Lynch did not stand
Hamble Valley	Conservative	Paul Holmes	Conservative	New seat. Holmes was previously MP for Eastleigh.
Hamilton and Clyde Valley	Scottish National	Imogen Walker	Labour	Angela Crawley, MP for the predecessor seat of Lanark and Hamilton East, did not stand
Hammersmith and Chiswick	Labour	Andy Slaughter	Labour	MP for the predecessor seat of Hammersmith
Hampstead and Highgate	Labour	Tulip Siddiq	Labour	MP for the predecessor seat of Hampstead and Kilburn
Harborough, Oadby and Wigston	Conservative	Neil O'Brien	Conservative	
Harlow	Conservative	Chris Vince	Labour Co-op	Incumbent Robert Halfon did not stand
Harpenden and Berkhamsted	Conservative	Victoria Collins	Liberal Democrats	Won new seat
Harrogate and Knaresborough	Conservative	Tom Gordon	Liberal Democrats	Defeated incumbent, Andrew Jones
Harrow East	Conservative	Bob Blackman	Conservative	
Harrow West	Labour	Gareth Thomas	Labour Co-op	
Hartlepool	Labour	Jonathan Brash	Labour	Defeated Conservative incumbent Jill Mortimer who was elected in 2021 by-election
Harwich and North Essex	Conservative	Bernard Jenkin	Conservative	
Hastings and Rye	Conservative	Helena Dollimore	Labour Co-op	Defeated incumbent Sally-Ann Hart
Havant	Conservative	Alan Mak	Conservative	
Hayes and Harlington	Labour	John McDonnell	Labour	
Hazel Grove	Conservative	Lisa Smart	Liberal Democrats	Incumbent William Wragg did not stand
Hemel Hempstead	Conservative	David Taylor	Labour	Incumbent Mike Penning did not stand
Hendon	Conservative	David Pinto-Duschinsky	Labour	Incumbent Matthew Offord did not stand
Henley and Thame	Conservative	Freddie van Mierlo	Liberal Democrats	Incumbent John Howell did not stand
Hereford and South Herefordshire	Conservative	Jesse Norman	Conservative	
Herne Bay and Sandwich	Conservative	Roger Gale	Conservative	MP for the predecessor seat of North Thanet
Hertford and Stortford	Conservative	Josh Dean	Labour	Defeated incumbent, Julie Marson
Hertsmere	Conservative	Oliver Dowden	Conservative	
Hexham	Conservative	Joe Morris	Labour	Defeated incumbent, Guy Opperman
Heywood and Middleton North	Labour	Elsie Blundell	Labour	Notional hold following boundary changes. Incumbent Conservative MP Chris Clarkson stood unsuccessfully in Stratford-on-Avon
High Peak	Conservative	Jon Pearce	Labour	Defeated incumbent, Robert Largan
Hinckley and Bosworth	Conservative	Luke Evans	Conservative	
Hitchin	Conservative	Alistair Strathern	Labour	Defeated Bim Afolami, incumbent for the predecessor seat of Hitchin and Harpenden; Strathern won the 2023 Mid Bedfordshire by-election and a small part of that constituency was transferred to Hitchin.
Holborn and St Pancras	Labour	Keir Starmer	Labour	Prime Minister of the United Kingdom (5 July 2024 – 20 July 2026)
Honiton and Sidmouth	Conservative	Richard Foord	Liberal Democrats	Foord won the predecessor seat of Tiverton and Honiton in the 2022 by-election. He defeated Simon Jupp, previously MP for East Devon.
Hornchurch and Upminster	Conservative	Julia Lopez	Conservative	
Hornsey and Friern Barnet	Labour	Catherine West	Labour	MP for the predecessor seat of Hornsey and Wood Green
Horsham	Conservative	John Milne	Liberal Democrats	Defeated incumbent, Jeremy Quin
Houghton and Sunderland South	Labour	Bridget Phillipson	Labour	Minister for Women and Equalities (8 July 2024 – present); Secretary of State for Education (5 July 2024 – 20 July 2026)
Hove and Portslade	Labour	Peter Kyle	Labour	Secretary of State for Business and Trade, President of the Board of Trade (5 September 2025 – 20 July 2026)
Huddersfield	Labour	Harpreet Uppal	Labour	Incumbent Barry Sheerman did not stand
Huntingdon	Conservative	Ben Obese-Jecty	Conservative	Incumbent Jonathan Djanogly did not stand
Hyndburn	Conservative	Sarah Smith	Labour	Defeated incumbent Sara Britcliffe
Ilford North	Labour	Wes Streeting	Labour	Secretary of State for Defence (20 July 2026 – present); Secretary of State for Health and Social Care (5 July 2024 – 14 May 2026)
Ilford South	Labour	Jas Athwal	Labour	Incumbent Sam Tarry did not stand
Inverclyde and Renfrewshire West	Scottish National	Martin McCluskey	Labour	Defeated Ronnie Cowan, incumbent for the predecessor seat of Inverclyde
Inverness, Skye and West Ross-shire	Scottish National	Angus MacDonald	Liberal Democrats	Defeated Drew Hendry, incumbent for the predecessor seat of Inverness, Nairn, Badenoch and Strathspey
Ipswich	Conservative	Jack Abbott	Labour Co-op	Defeated incumbent, Tom Hunt
Isle of Wight East	Conservative	Joe Robertson	Conservative	New seat won
Isle of Wight West	Conservative	Richard Quigley	Labour	Defeated Bob Seely, incumbent MP for Isle of Wight
Islington North	Labour	Jeremy Corbyn	Independent	Seat held. Corbyn was elected for Labour in 2019, but had sat as an independent since 2020.
Islington South and Finsbury	Labour	Emily Thornberry	Labour	
Jarrow and Gateshead East	Labour	Kate Osborne	Labour	MP for the predecessor seat of Jarrow
Keighley and Ilkley	Conservative	Robbie Moore	Conservative	
Kenilworth and Southam	Conservative	Jeremy Wright	Conservative	
Kensington and Bayswater	Labour	Joe Powell	Labour	Notional hold. Defeated Felicity Buchan, incumbent Conservative MP for the predecessor seat of Kensington.
Kettering	Conservative	Rosie Wrighting	Labour	Defeated incumbent, Philip Hollobone
Kilmarnock and Loudoun	Scottish National	Lillian Jones	Labour	Defeated incumbent, Alan Brown
Kingston and Surbiton	Liberal Democrats	Ed Davey	Liberal Democrats	
Kingston upon Hull East	Labour	Karl Turner	Labour	
Kingston upon Hull North and Cottingham	Labour	Diana Johnson	Labour	MP for predecessor seat of Kingston upon Hull North
Kingston upon Hull West and Haltemprice	Conservative	Emma Hardy	Labour	Notional gain following boundary changes. Hardy was previously MP for the predecessor seat of Kingston upon Hull West and Hessle.
Kingswinford and South Staffordshire	Conservative	Mike Wood	Conservative	Previously MP for the abolished seat of Dudley South
Knowsley	Labour	Anneliese Midgley	Labour	Previous incumbent, George Howarth, did not stand Parliamentary Secretary to the Treasury (Chief Whip) (20 July 2026 – present)
Lagan Valley	Democratic Unionist	Sorcha Eastwood	Alliance	Previous incumbent, Jeffrey Donaldson, did not stand
Lancaster and Wyre	Conservative	Cat Smith	Labour	Notional gain following boundary changes. Smith was previously MP for the predecessor seat of Lancaster and Fleetwood.
Leeds Central and Headingley	Labour	Alex Sobel	Labour Co-op	New seat. Sobel was previously MP for Leeds North West
Leeds East	Labour	Richard Burgon	Labour	
Leeds North East	Labour	Fabian Hamilton	Labour	
Leeds North West	Conservative	Katie White	Labour	Notional gain following boundary changes. Incumbent Labour MP, Alex Sobel, stood successfully for the new seat of Leeds Central and Headingley.
Leeds South	Labour	Hilary Benn	Labour	MP for the predecessor seat of Leeds Central Secretary of State for Northern Ireland (5 July 2024 – 20 July 2026)
Leeds South West and Morley	Conservative	Mark Sewards	Labour	Defeated Andrea Jenkyns, incumbent for the predecessor seat of Morley and Outwood.
Leeds West and Pudsey	Labour	Rachel Reeves	Labour	Notional hold following boundary changes. Reeves was MP for the abolished seat of Leeds West. Previous incumbent for the predecessor seat of Pudsey, Stuart Andrew, stood in Daventry Chancellor of the Exchequer (5 July 2024 – 20 July 2026)
Leicester East	Labour	Shivani Raja	Conservative	Defeated incumbent, Claudia Webbe, who stood as an independent. She was elected for Labour in 2019, but had sat as an independent since 2021.
Leicester South	Labour	Shockat Adam	Independent	Defeated incumbent, Jonathan Ashworth
Leicester West	Labour	Liz Kendall	Labour	Secretary of State for Work and Pensions (5 July 2024 – 5 September 2025); Secretary of State for Science, Innovation and Technology (5 September 2025 – 20 July 2026)
Leigh and Atherton	Conservative	Jo Platt	Labour Co-op	Previous incumbent for the predecessor seat of Leigh, James Grundy, did not stand
Lewes	Conservative	James MacCleary	Liberal Democrats	Defeated incumbent, Maria Caulfield
Lewisham East	Labour	Janet Daby	Labour	
Lewisham North	Labour	Vicky Foxcroft	Labour	MP for the predecessor seat of Lewisham Deptford
Lewisham West and East Dulwich	Labour	Ellie Reeves	Labour	MP for predecessor seat of Lewisham West and Penge. Attorney General and Advocate General for Northern Ireland (20 July 2026 – present); Minister of State (Minister without Portfolio)(2 December 2024 – 6 September 2025)
Leyton and Wanstead	Labour	Calvin Bailey	Labour	Previous incumbent, John Cryer, did not stand
Lichfield	Conservative	Dave Robertson	Labour	Defeated incumbent, Michael Fabricant
Lincoln	Conservative	Hamish Falconer	Labour	Defeated incumbent, Karl McCartney
Liverpool Garston	Labour	Maria Eagle	Labour	MP for the predecessor seat of Garston and Halewood
Liverpool Riverside	Labour	Kim Johnson	Labour	
Liverpool Walton	Labour	Dan Carden	Labour	
Liverpool Wavertree	Labour	Paula Barker	Labour	
Liverpool West Derby	Labour	Ian Byrne	Labour	
Livingston	Scottish National	Gregor Poynton	Labour	Defeated incumbent, Hannah Bardell
Llanelli	Labour	Nia Griffith	Labour	
Lothian East	Scottish National	Douglas Alexander	Labour Co-op	Previous incumbent, Kenny MacAskill, stood in Alloa and Grangemouth for the Alba Party. Secretary of State for Scotland (5 September 2025 – present) Minister of State (also Minister for Trade Policy and Economic Security) (10 February 2025– 5 September 2025)
Loughborough	Conservative	Jeevun Sandher	Labour	Defeated incumbent, Jane Hunt
Louth and Horncastle	Conservative	Victoria Atkins	Conservative	
Lowestoft	Conservative	Jessica Asato	Labour	Defeated Peter Aldous, incumbent for the predecessor seat of Waveney
Luton North	Labour	Sarah Owen	Labour	
Luton South and South Bedfordshire	Labour	Rachel Hopkins	Labour	
Macclesfield	Conservative	Tim Roca	Labour	Defeated incumbent, David Rutley
Maidenhead	Conservative	Joshua Reynolds	Liberal Democrats	Previous incumbent, Theresa May, did not stand
Maidstone and Malling	Conservative	Helen Grant	Conservative	MP for the predecessor seat of Maidstone and The Weald
Makerfield	Labour	Josh Simons	Labour	Previous incumbent, Yvonne Fovargue, did not stand
Maldon	Conservative	John Whittingdale	Conservative	
Manchester Central	Labour	Lucy Powell	Labour Co-op	Secretary of State for Education (20 July 2026 – present); Lord President of the Council and Leader of the House of Commons (5 July 2024 – 5 September 2025)
Manchester Rusholme	Labour	Afzal Khan	Labour	New seat. Khan was previously MP for Manchester Gorton
Manchester Withington	Labour	Jeff Smith	Labour	
Mansfield	Conservative	Steve Yemm	Labour	Defeated incumbent, Ben Bradley
Melksham and Devizes	Conservative	Brian Mathew	Liberal Democrats	New seat. Mathew defeated Michelle Donelan, who was previously MP for Chippenham.
Melton and Syston	Conservative	Edward Argar	Conservative	New seat. Argar was previously MP for Charnwood.
Meriden and Solihull East	Conservative	Saqib Bhatti	Conservative	MP for the predecessor seat of Meriden
Merthyr Tydfil and Aberdare	Labour	Gerald Jones	Labour	MP for the predecessor seat of Merthyr Tydfil and Ryhmney
Mid and South Pembrokeshire	Conservative	Henry Tufnell	Labour	Defeated Stephen Crabb, incumbent for the predecessor seat of Preseli Pembrokeshire
Mid Bedfordshire	Conservative	Blake Stephenson	Conservative	Won by Alistair Strathern for Labour in 2023 by-election. Strathern stood in Hitchin in 2024.
Mid Buckinghamshire	Conservative	Greg Smith	Conservative	New seat. Smith was previously the MP for Buckingham.
Mid Cheshire	Conservative	Andrew Cooper	Labour	New seat
Mid Derbyshire	Conservative	Jonathan Davies	Labour	Previous incumbent, Pauline Latham, did not stand
Mid Dorset and North Poole	Conservative	Vikki Slade	Liberal Democrats	Defeated incumbent, Michael Tomlinson
Mid Dunbartonshire	Scottish National	Susan Murray	Liberal Democrats	Defeated Amy Callaghan, incumbent for the predecessor seat of East Dunbartonshire
Mid Leicestershire	Conservative	Peter Bedford	Conservative	Incumbent for the predecessor seat of Charnwood, Edward Argar, stood in the new seat of Melton and Syston
Mid Norfolk	Conservative	George Freeman	Conservative	
Mid Sussex	Conservative	Alison Bennett	Liberal Democrats	Previous incumbent, Mims Davies, stood in the new seat of East Grinstead and Uckfield
Mid Ulster	Sinn Féin	Cathal Mallaghan	Sinn Féin	Previous incumbent, Francie Molloy, did not stand
Middlesbrough and Thornaby East	Labour	Andy McDonald	Labour	MP for the predecessor seat of Middlesbrough
Middlesbrough South and East Cleveland	Conservative	Luke Myer	Labour	Defeated incumbent, Simon Clarke
Midlothian	Scottish National	Kirsty McNeill	Labour Co-op	Defeated incumbent, Owen Thompson
Milton Keynes Central	Conservative	Emily Darlington	Labour	Iain Stewart, incumbent MP for the predecessor seat of Milton Keynes South, stood unsuccessfully in the new seat of Buckingham and Bletchley
Milton Keynes North	Conservative	Chris Curtis	Labour	Defeated incumbent, Ben Everitt
Mitcham and Morden	Labour	Siobhain McDonagh	Labour	
Monmouthshire	Conservative	Catherine Fookes	Labour	Defeated incumbent, David TC Davies
Montgomeryshire and Glyndŵr	Conservative	Steve Witherden	Labour	Defeated Craig Williams, incumbent for the predecessor seat of Montgomeryshire
Moray West, Nairn and Strathspey	Scottish National	Graham Leadbitter	Scottish National	Notional hold following boundary changes. Douglas Ross, incumbent Conservative MP for the predecessor seat of Moray, stood unsuccessfully in Aberdeenshire North and Moray East
Morecambe and Lunesdale	Conservative	Lizzi Collinge	Labour	Defeated incumbent, David Morris
Motherwell, Wishaw and Carluke	Scottish National	Pamela Nash	Labour	Defeated Marion Fellows, incumbent for the predecessor seat of Motherwell and Wishaw
Na h-Eileanan an Iar	Scottish National	Torcuil Crichton	Labour	Defeated incumbent, Angus MacNeil
Neath and Swansea East	Labour	Carolyn Harris	Labour	Formerly MP for the abolished seat of Swansea East. Previous incumbent for the predecessor seat of Neath, Christina Rees, did not stand
New Forest East	Conservative	Julian Lewis	Conservative	
New Forest West	Conservative	Desmond Swayne	Conservative	
Newark	Conservative	Robert Jenrick	Conservative	
Newbury	Conservative	Lee Dillon	Liberal Democrats	Defeated incumbent, Laura Farris
Newcastle upon Tyne Central and West	Labour	Chi Onwurah	Labour	MP for the predecessor seat of Newcastle upon Tyne Central
Newcastle upon Tyne East and Wallsend	Labour	Mary Glindon	Labour	Formerly MP for the abolished seat of North Tyneside. Previous incumbent for the predecessor seat of Newcastle upon Tyne East, Nick Brown, did not stand.
Newcastle upon Tyne North	Labour	Catherine McKinnell	Labour	
Newcastle-under-Lyme	Conservative	Adam Jogee	Labour	Previous incumbent, Aaron Bell, did not stand
Newport East	Labour	Jessica Morden	Labour	
Newport West and Islwyn	Labour	Ruth Jones	Labour	Formerly MP for the abolished seat of Newport West. Previous incumbent for the predecessor seat of Islwyn, Chris Evans, stood successfully for Caerphilly.
Newry and Armagh	Sinn Féin	Dáire Hughes	Sinn Féin	Previous incumbent, Mickey Brady, did not stand
Newton Abbot	Conservative	Martin Wrigley	Liberal Democrats	Defeated incumbent, Anne Marie Morris
Newton Aycliffe and Spennymoor	Conservative	Alan Strickland	Labour	Defeated Paul Howell, incumbent for the predecessor seat of Sedgefield
Normanton and Hemsworth	Labour	Jon Trickett	Labour	MP for the predecessor seat of Hemsworth
North Antrim	Democratic Unionist	Jim Allister	Traditional Unionist Voice	Defeated incumbent, Ian Paisley Jr
North Ayrshire and Arran	Scottish National	Irene Campbell	Labour	Defeated incumbent, Patricia Gibson
North Bedfordshire	Conservative	Richard Fuller	Conservative	MP for the predecessor seat of North East Bedfordshire
North Cornwall	Conservative	Ben Maguire	Liberal Democrats	Defeated incumbent, Scott Mann
North Cotswolds	Conservative	Geoffrey Clifton-Brown	Conservative	New seat. Clifton-Brown was previously MP for The Cotswolds
North Devon	Conservative	Ian Roome	Liberal Democrats	Defeated incumbent, Selaine Saxby
North Dorset	Conservative	Simon Hoare	Conservative	Seat held
North Down	Alliance	Alex Easton	Independent	Defeated incumbent, Stephen Farry
North Durham	Labour	Luke Akehurst	Labour	Previous incumbent, Kevan Jones, did not stand
North East Cambridgeshire	Conservative	Steve Barclay	Conservative	
North East Derbyshire	Conservative	Louise Jones	Labour	Defeated incumbent, Lee Rowley
North East Fife	Scottish National	Wendy Chamberlain	Liberal Democrats	Seat held. Nominal gain following boundary changes.
North East Hampshire	Conservative	Alex Brewer	Liberal Democrats	Defeated incumbent, Ranil Jayawardena
North East Hertfordshire	Conservative	Chris Hinchliff	Labour	Previous incumbent, Oliver Heald, did not stand
North East Somerset and Hanham	Conservative	Dan Norris	Labour	Defeated Jacob Rees-Mogg, incumbent for the predecessor seat of North East Somerset
North Herefordshire	Conservative	Ellie Chowns	Green	Defeated incumbent, Bill Wiggin
North Norfolk	Conservative	Steffan Aquarone	Liberal Democrats	Defeated incumbent, Duncan Baker
North Northumberland	Conservative	David Smith	Labour	Defeated Anne-Marie Trevelyan, incumbent for the predecessor seat of Berwick-upon-Tweed
North Shropshire	Conservative	Helen Morgan	Liberal Democrats	Won by Liberal Democrats at 2021 by-election
North Somerset	Conservative	Sadik Al-Hassan	Labour	Defeated incumbent, Liam Fox
North Warwickshire and Bedworth	Conservative	Rachel Taylor	Labour	Defeated incumbent, Craig Tracey
North West Cambridgeshire	Conservative	Sam Carling	Labour	Defeated incumbent, Shailesh Vara
North West Essex	Conservative	Kemi Badenoch	Conservative	MP for predecessor seat of Saffron Walden
North West Hampshire	Conservative	Kit Malthouse	Conservative	
North West Leicestershire	Conservative	Amanda Hack	Labour	Defeated incumbent, Andrew Bridgen, who had been elected as a Conservative MP in 2019, but stood as an independent in 2024
North West Norfolk	Conservative	James Wild	Conservative	
Northampton North	Conservative	Lucy Rigby	Labour	Previous incumbent, Michael Ellis, did not stand. Chief Secretary to the Treasury (14 May 2026 – 20 July 2026)
Northampton South	Conservative	Mike Reader	Labour	Defeated incumbent, Andrew Lewer
Norwich North	Conservative	Alice Macdonald	Labour Co-op	Previous incumbent, Chloe Smith, did not stand
Norwich South	Labour	Clive Lewis	Labour	
Nottingham East	Labour	Nadia Whittome	Labour	
Nottingham North and Kimberley	Labour	Alex Norris	Labour Co-op	MP for the predecessor seat of Nottingham North. Lord Chancellor and Secretary of State for Justice (20 July 2026 – present)
Nottingham South	Labour	Lilian Greenwood	Labour	
Nuneaton	Conservative	Jodie Gosling	Labour	Defeated incumbent, Marcus Jones
Old Bexley and Sidcup	Conservative	Louie French	Conservative	
Oldham East and Saddleworth	Labour	Debbie Abrahams	Labour	
Oldham West, Chadderton and Royton	Labour	Jim McMahon	Labour Co-op	
Orkney and Shetland	Liberal Democrats	Alistair Carmichael	Liberal Democrats	
Orpington	Conservative	Gareth Bacon	Conservative	
Ossett and Denby Dale	Conservative	Jade Botterill	Labour	Defeated Mark Eastwood, previous MP for Dewsbury. Simon Lightwood, incumbent MP for the predecessor seat of Wakefield, stood successfully for the new seat of Wakefield and Rothwell.
Oxford East	Labour	Anneliese Dodds	Labour Co-op	Minister of State (Development) and Minister of State (Minister for Women and Equalities) (8 July 2024 – 28 February 2025)
Oxford West and Abingdon	Liberal Democrats	Layla Moran	Liberal Democrats	
Paisley and Renfrewshire North	Scottish National	Alison Taylor	Labour	Defeated incumbent, Gavin Newlands
Paisley and Renfrewshire South	Scottish National	Johanna Baxter	Labour	Previous incumbent, Mhairi Black, did not stand
Peckham	Labour	Miatta Fahnbulleh	Labour Co-op	Previous incumbent for the predecessor seat of Camberwell and Peckham, Harriet Harman, did not stand Secretary of State for Energy Security and Net Zero (20 July 2026 – present)
Pendle and Clitheroe	Conservative	Jonathan Hinder	Labour	Defeated Andrew Stephenson, incumbent for the predecessor seat of Pendle
Penistone and Stocksbridge	Conservative	Marie Tidball	Labour	Defeated incumbent, Miriam Cates
Penrith and Solway	Conservative	Markus Campbell-Savours	Labour	Defeated Mark Jenkinson, incumbent for the predecessor seat of Workington
Perth and Kinross-shire	Scottish National	Pete Wishart	Scottish National	MP for the predecessor seat of Perth and North Perthshire
Peterborough	Conservative	Andrew Pakes	Labour Co-op	Defeated incumbent, Paul Bristow
Plymouth Moor View	Conservative	Fred Thomas	Labour	Defeated incumbent, Johnny Mercer
Plymouth Sutton and Devonport	Labour	Luke Pollard	Labour Co-op	
Pontefract, Castleford and Knottingley	Labour	Yvette Cooper	Labour	MP for the predecessor seat of Normanton, Pontefract and Castleford. Secretary of State for Health and Social Care (20 July 2026 – present); Secretary of State for the Home Department (5 July 2024 – 5 September 2025) Secretary of State for Foreign, Commonwealth and Development Affairs (5 September 2025 – 17 July 2026)
Pontypridd	Labour	Alex Davies-Jones	Labour	
Poole	Conservative	Neil Duncan-Jordan	Labour	Defeated incumbent, Robert Syms
Poplar and Limehouse	Labour	Apsana Begum	Labour	
Portsmouth North	Conservative	Amanda Martin	Labour	Defeated incumbent, Penny Mordaunt
Portsmouth South	Labour	Stephen Morgan	Labour	
Preston	Labour	Mark Hendrick	Labour Co-op	
Putney	Labour	Fleur Anderson	Labour	
Queen's Park and Maida Vale	Labour	Georgia Gould	Labour	Previous incumbent for the predecessor seat of Westminster North, Karen Buck, did not stand
Rawmarsh and Conisbrough	Labour	John Healey	Labour	MP for the predecessor seat of Wentworth and Dearne. Chancellor of the Exchequer (20 July 2026 – present); Secretary of State for Defence (5 July 2024 – 11 June 2026)
Rayleigh and Wickford	Conservative	Mark Francois	Conservative	
Reading Central	Labour	Matt Rodda	Labour	MP for the predecessor seat of Reading East
Reading West and Mid Berkshire	Conservative	Olivia Bailey	Labour	Previous incumbent for the predecessor seat of Reading West, Alok Sharma, did not stand
Redcar	Conservative	Anna Turley	Labour Co-op	Defeated incumbent, Jacob Young. Minister of State (Minister without Portfolio) (6 September 2025 – 20 July 2026)
Redditch	Conservative	Chris Bloore	Labour	Defeated incumbent, Rachel Maclean
Reigate	Conservative	Rebecca Paul	Conservative	Previous incumbent, Crispin Blunt, did not stand
Rhondda and Ogmore	Labour	Chris Bryant	Labour	MP for the predecessor seat of Rhondda; Secretary of State for Northern Ireland (20 July 2026 – present)
Ribble Valley	Conservative	Maya Ellis	Labour	Defeated incumbent, Nigel Evans
Richmond and Northallerton	Conservative	Rishi Sunak	Conservative	MP for the predecessor seat of Richmond (Yorks)
Richmond Park	Liberal Democrats	Sarah Olney	Liberal Democrats	
Rochdale	Labour	Paul Waugh	Labour Co-op	Defeated incumbent, George Galloway, who had been elected four months prior in the 2024 by-election for the Workers Party
Rochester and Strood	Conservative	Lauren Edwards	Labour	Defeated incumbent, Kelly Tolhurst
Romford	Conservative	Andrew Rosindell	Conservative	
Romsey and Southampton North	Conservative	Caroline Nokes	Conservative	
Rossendale and Darwen	Conservative	Andy MacNae	Labour	Defeated incumbent, Jake Berry
Rother Valley	Conservative	Jake Richards	Labour	Defeated incumbent, Alexander Stafford
Rotherham	Labour	Sarah Champion	Labour	
Rugby	Conservative	John Slinger	Labour	Previous incumbent, Mark Pawsey, did not stand
Ruislip, Northwood and Pinner	Conservative	David Simmonds	Conservative	
Runcorn and Helsby	Labour	Mike Amesbury	Labour	MP for the predecessor seat of Weaver Vale
Runnymede and Weybridge	Conservative	Ben Spencer	Conservative	
Rushcliffe	Conservative	James Naish	Labour	Defeated incumbent, Ruth Edwards
Rutherglen	Scottish National	Michael Shanks	Labour	Predecessor seat of Rutherglen and Hamilton West won by Labour at 2023 by-election
Rutland and Stamford	Conservative	Alicia Kearns	Conservative	MP for the predecessor seat of Rutland and Melton
Salford	Labour	Rebecca Long-Bailey	Labour	
Salisbury	Conservative	John Glen	Conservative	
Scarborough and Whitby	Conservative	Alison Hume	Labour	Previous incumbent, Robert Goodwill, did not stand
Scunthorpe	Conservative	Nic Dakin	Labour	Defeated incumbent, Holly Mumby-Croft
Sefton Central	Labour	Bill Esterson	Labour	
Selby	Conservative	Keir Mather	Labour	Predecessor seat of Selby and Ainsty won by Labour at 2023 by-election
Sevenoaks	Conservative	Laura Trott	Conservative	
Sheffield Brightside and Hillsborough	Labour	Gill Furniss	Labour	
Sheffield Central	Labour	Abtisam Mohamed	Labour	Previous incumbent, Paul Blomfield, did not stand
Sheffield Hallam	Labour	Olivia Blake	Labour	
Sheffield Heeley	Labour	Louise Haigh	Labour	First Secretary of State, Chancellor of the Duchy of Lancaster and Minister for the Cabinet Office (20 July 2026 – present); Secretary of State for Transport (5 July 2024 – 28 November 2024)
Sheffield South East	Labour	Clive Betts	Labour	
Sherwood Forest	Conservative	Michelle Welsh	Labour	Defeated incumbent, Mark Spencer
Shipley	Conservative	Anna Dixon	Labour	Defeated incumbent, Philip Davies
Shrewsbury	Conservative	Julia Buckley	Labour	Defeated incumbent, Daniel Kawczynski
Sittingbourne and Sheppey	Conservative	Kevin McKenna	Labour	Previous incumbent, Gordon Henderson, did not stand
Skipton and Ripon	Conservative	Julian Smith	Conservative	
Sleaford and North Hykeham	Conservative	Caroline Johnson	Conservative	
Slough	Labour	Tan Dhesi	Labour	
Smethwick	Labour	Gurinder Josan	Labour	Previous incumbent for the predecessor seat of Warley, John Spellar, did not stand
Solihull West and Shirley	Conservative	Neil Shastri-Hurst	Conservative	Defeated incumbent, Julian Knight, who had been elected as a Conservative MP in 2019, but stood as an independent in 2024
South Antrim	Democratic Unionist	Robin Swann	Ulster Unionist	Defeated incumbent, Paul Girvan
South Basildon and East Thurrock	Conservative	James McMurdock	Reform UK	Defeated incumbent, Stephen Metcalfe
South Cambridgeshire	Conservative	Pippa Heylings	Liberal Democrats	Previous incumbent, Anthony Browne, stood unsuccessfully in the new seat of St Neots and Mid Cambridgeshire
South Cotswolds	Conservative	Roz Savage	Liberal Democrats	Defeated James Gray, who was incumbent for the abolished seat of North Wiltshire
South Derbyshire	Conservative	Samantha Niblett	Labour	Defeated incumbent, Heather Wheeler
South Devon	Conservative	Caroline Voaden	Liberal Democrats	Defeated Anthony Mangnall, incumbent for the predecessor seat of Totnes
South Dorset	Conservative	Lloyd Hatton	Labour	Defeated incumbent, Richard Drax
South Down	Sinn Féin	Chris Hazzard	Sinn Féin	
South East Cornwall	Conservative	Anna Gelderd	Labour	Defeated incumbent, Sheryll Murray
South Holland and the Deepings	Conservative	John Hayes	Conservative	
South Leicestershire	Conservative	Alberto Costa	Conservative	
South Norfolk	Conservative	Ben Goldsborough	Labour	Previous incumbent, Richard Bacon, did not stand
South Northamptonshire	Conservative	Sarah Bool	Conservative	Previous incumbent, Andrea Leadsom, did not stand
South Ribble	Conservative	Paul Foster	Labour	Defeated incumbent, Katherine Fletcher
South Shields	Labour	Emma Lewell-Buck	Labour	
South Shropshire	Conservative	Stuart Anderson	Conservative	Previous incumbent for the predecessor seat of Ludlow, Philip Dunne, did not stand
South Suffolk	Conservative	James Cartlidge	Conservative	
South West Devon	Conservative	Rebecca Smith	Conservative	Previous incumbent, Gary Streeter, did not stand
South West Hertfordshire	Conservative	Gagan Mohindra	Conservative	
South West Norfolk	Conservative	Terry Jermy	Labour	Defeated incumbent, former Prime Minister Liz Truss
South West Wiltshire	Conservative	Andrew Murrison	Conservative	
Southampton Itchen	Conservative	Darren Paffey	Labour	Previous incumbent, Royston Smith, did not stand
Southampton Test	Labour	Satvir Kaur	Labour	Previous incumbent, Alan Whitehead, did not stand
Southend East and Rochford	Conservative	Bayo Alaba	Labour	Previous incumbent, James Duddridge, did not stand
Southend West and Leigh	Conservative	David Burton-Sampson	Labour	Defeated incumbent, Anna Firth
Southgate and Wood Green	Labour	Bambos Charalambous	Labour	MP for the predecessor seat of Enfield Southgate
Southport	Conservative	Patrick Hurley	Labour	Defeated incumbent, Damien Moore
Spelthorne	Conservative	Lincoln Jopp	Conservative	Previous incumbent, Kwasi Kwarteng, did not stand
Spen Valley	Conservative	Kim Leadbeater	Labour	MP for the predecessor seat of Batley and Spen
St Albans	Liberal Democrats	Daisy Cooper	Liberal Democrats	
St Austell and Newquay	Conservative	Noah Law	Labour	Defeated incumbent, Steve Double
St Helens North	Labour	David Baines	Labour	Previous incumbent, Conor McGinn, did not stand
St Helens South and Whiston	Labour	Marie Rimmer	Labour	
St Ives	Conservative	Andrew George	Liberal Democrats	Defeated incumbent, Derek Thomas
St Neots and Mid Cambridgeshire	Conservative	Ian Sollom	Liberal Democrats	New seat. Defeated Anthony Browne, incumbent for South Cambridgeshire
Stafford	Conservative	Leigh Ingham	Labour	Defeated incumbent, Theo Clarke
Staffordshire Moorlands	Conservative	Karen Bradley	Conservative	
Stalybridge and Hyde	Labour	Jonathan Reynolds	Labour Co-op	Secretary of State for Business, Innovation, Science and Trade and President of the Board of Trade (20 July 2026 – present); Secretary of State for Business and Trade and President of the Board of Trade (5 July 2024 – 5 September 2025); Parliamentary Secretary to the Treasury (Chief Whip) (5 September 2025 – 20 July 2026)
Stevenage	Conservative	Kevin Bonavia	Labour	Previous incumbent, Stephen McPartland, did not stand
Stirling and Strathallan	Scottish National	Chris Kane	Labour	Defeated Alyn Smith, incumbent for the predecessor seat of Stirling
Stockport	Labour	Navendu Mishra	Labour	
Stockton North	Labour	Chris McDonald	Labour	Previous incumbent, Alex Cunningham, did not stand
Stockton West	Conservative	Matt Vickers	Conservative	MP for the predecessor seat of Stockton South
Stoke-on-Trent Central	Conservative	Gareth Snell	Labour Co-op	Previous incumbent, Jo Gideon, did not stand
Stoke-on-Trent North	Conservative	David Williams	Labour	Defeated incumbent, Jonathan Gullis
Stoke-on-Trent South	Conservative	Allison Gardner	Labour	Defeated incumbent, Jack Brereton
Stone, Great Wyrley and Penkridge	Conservative	Gavin Williamson	Conservative	New seat. Previously MP for South Staffordshire
Stourbridge	Conservative	Cat Eccles	Labour	Defeated incumbent, Suzanne Webb
Strangford	Democratic Unionist	Jim Shannon	Democratic Unionist	
Stratford and Bow	Labour	Uma Kumaran	Labour	New seat
Stratford-on-Avon	Conservative	Manuela Perteghella	Liberal Democrats	Previous incumbent, Nadhim Zahawi, did not stand
Streatham and Croydon North	Labour	Steve Reed	Labour Co-op	New seat. Previously MP for Croydon North. Secretary of State for Environment, Food and Rural Affairs (5 July 2024 – 5 September 2025); Secretary of State for Housing, Communities and Local Government (5 September 2025 – 20 July 2026)
Stretford and Urmston	Labour	Andrew Western	Labour	
Stroud	Conservative	Simon Opher	Labour	Defeated incumbent, Siobhan Baillie
Suffolk Coastal	Conservative	Jenny Riddell-Carpenter	Labour	Defeated incumbent, Thérèse Coffey
Sunderland Central	Labour	Lewis Atkinson	Labour	Previous incumbent, Julie Elliott, did not stand
Surrey Heath	Conservative	Al Pinkerton	Liberal Democrats	Previous incumbent, Michael Gove, did not stand
Sussex Weald	Conservative	Nus Ghani	Conservative	MP for the predecessor seat of Wealden
Sutton and Cheam	Conservative	Luke Taylor	Liberal Democrats	Previous incumbent, Paul Scully, did not stand
Sutton Coldfield	Conservative	Andrew Mitchell	Conservative	
Swansea West	Labour	Torsten Bell	Labour	Previous incumbent, Geraint Davies, did not stand
Swindon North	Conservative	Will Stone	Labour	Defeated incumbent, Justin Tomlinson
Swindon South	Conservative	Heidi Alexander	Labour	Defeated incumbent, Robert Buckland Secretary of State for Transport (24 September 2024 – present)
Tamworth	Conservative	Sarah Edwards	Labour	Won by Labour at 2023 by-election. Defeated Eddie Hughes, previously Conservative MP for Walsall North.
Tatton	Conservative	Esther McVey	Conservative	
Taunton and Wellington	Conservative	Gideon Amos	Liberal Democrats	Defeated Rebecca Pow, incumbent for the predecessor seat of Taunton Deane
Telford	Conservative	Shaun Davies	Labour	Previous incumbent, Lucy Allan, did not stand
Tewkesbury	Conservative	Cameron Thomas	Liberal Democrats	Defeated incumbent, Laurence Robertson
The Wrekin	Conservative	Mark Pritchard	Conservative	
Thirsk and Malton	Conservative	Kevin Hollinrake	Conservative	
Thornbury and Yate	Conservative	Claire Young	Liberal Democrats	Defeated incumbent, Luke Hall
Thurrock	Conservative	Jen Craft	Labour	Defeated incumbent, Jackie Doyle-Price
Tipton and Wednesbury	Conservative	Antonia Bance	Labour	Defeated Shaun Bailey, incumbent MP for the predecessor seat of West Bromwich West
Tiverton and Minehead	Conservative	Rachel Gilmour	Liberal Democrats	New seat. Defeated Ian Liddell-Grainger, incumbent MP Bridgwater and West Somerset.
Tonbridge	Conservative	Tom Tugendhat	Conservative	MP for the predecessor seat of Tonbridge and Malling
Tooting	Labour	Rosena Allin-Khan	Labour	
Torbay	Conservative	Steve Darling	Liberal Democrats	Defeated incumbent, Kevin Foster
Torfaen	Labour	Nick Thomas-Symonds	Labour	Paymaster General, Minister for the Cabinet Office (Minister for the Constitution and European Union Relations) (8 July 2024 – 20 July 2026)
Torridge and Tavistock	Conservative	Geoffrey Cox	Conservative	MP for the predecessor seat of Torridge and West Devon
Tottenham	Labour	David Lammy	Labour	Secretary of State for Foreign, Commonwealth and Development Affairs (5 July 2024 – 5 September 2025); Deputy Prime Minister and Secretary of State for Justice (5 September 2025 – 20 July 2026)
Truro and Falmouth	Conservative	Jayne Kirkham	Labour Co-op	Defeated incumbent, Cherilyn Mackrory
Tunbridge Wells	Conservative	Mike Martin	Liberal Democrats	Previous incumbent, Greg Clark, did not stand
Twickenham	Liberal Democrats	Munira Wilson	Liberal Democrats	
Tynemouth	Labour	Alan Campbell	Labour	Lord President of the Council and Leader of the House of Commons (5 September 2025 – present); Parliamentary Secretary to the Treasury (5 July 2024 – 5 September 2025)
Upper Bann	Democratic Unionist	Carla Lockhart	Democratic Unionist	
Uxbridge and South Ruislip	Conservative	Danny Beales	Labour	Defeated incumbent, Steve Tuckwell who was elected at the 2023 by-election.
Vale of Glamorgan	Conservative	Kanishka Narayan	Labour	Defeated incumbent, Alun Cairns; Minister for Artificial Intelligence (20 July 2026 – present)
Vauxhall and Camberwell Green	Labour	Florence Eshalomi	Labour Co-op	MP for the predecessor seat of Vauxhall
Wakefield and Rothwell	Conservative	Simon Lightwood	Labour Co-op	New seat. Previously MP for Wakefield (Labour gain at 2022 by-election)
Wallasey	Labour	Angela Eagle	Labour	Secretary of State for Environment, Food and Rural Affairs (20 July 2026 – present); Minister of State for Security (12 June 2026 – 20 July 2026)
Walsall and Bloxwich	Conservative	Valerie Vaz	Labour	Previously MP for the abolished seat of Walsall South. Incumbent for the predecessor seat of Walsall North, Eddie Hughes, who stood unsuccessfully in Tamworth.
Walthamstow	Labour	Stella Creasy	Labour Co-op	
Warrington North	Labour	Charlotte Nichols	Labour	
Warrington South	Labour	Sarah Hall	Labour Co-op	Notional hold. Defeated Conservative incumbent, Andy Carter
Warwick and Leamington	Labour	Matt Western	Labour	
Washington and Gateshead South	Labour	Sharon Hodgson	Labour	MP for the predecessor seat of Washington and Sunderland West
Watford	Conservative	Matt Turmaine	Labour	Defeated incumbent, Dean Russell
Waveney Valley	Conservative	Adrian Ramsay	Green	New seat
Weald of Kent	Conservative	Katie Lam	Conservative	New seat
Wellingborough and Rushden	Conservative	Gen Kitchen	Labour	Won by Labour at 2024 by-election
Wells and Mendip Hills	Conservative	Tessa Munt	Liberal Democrats	Previous incumbent for the predecessor seat of Wells, James Heappey, did not stand
Welwyn Hatfield	Conservative	Andrew Lewin	Labour	Defeated incumbent, Grant Shapps
West Aberdeenshire and Kincardine	Conservative	Andrew Bowie	Conservative	
West Bromwich	Conservative	Sarah Coombes	Labour	Previous incumbent for the predecessor seat of West Bromwich East, Nicola Richards, did not stand
West Dorset	Conservative	Edward Morello	Liberal Democrats	Defeated incumbent, Chris Loder
West Dunbartonshire	Scottish National	Douglas McAllister	Labour	Defeated incumbent, Martin Docherty-Hughes
West Ham and Beckton	Labour	James Asser	Labour	Previous incumbent for the predecessor seat of West Ham, Lyn Brown, did not stand
West Lancashire	Labour	Ashley Dalton	Labour	
West Suffolk	Conservative	Nick Timothy	Conservative	Previous incumbent, Matt Hancock, did not stand
West Tyrone	Sinn Féin	Órfhlaith Begley	Sinn Féin	
West Worcestershire	Conservative	Harriett Baldwin	Conservative	
Westmorland and Lonsdale	Conservative	Tim Farron	Liberal Democrats	Seat held. Nominal gain following boundary changes.
Weston-super-Mare	Conservative	Dan Aldridge	Labour	Defeated incumbent, John Penrose
Wetherby and Easingwold	Conservative	Alec Shelbrooke	Conservative	MP for the predecessor seat of Elmet and Rothwell
Whitehaven and Workington	Conservative	Josh MacAlister	Labour	Previous incumbent for the predecessor seat of Copeland, Trudy Harrison, did not stand
Widnes and Halewood	Labour	Derek Twigg	Labour	MP for the predecessor seat of Halton
Wigan	Labour	Lisa Nandy	Labour	Secretary of State for Digital, Culture, Media and Sport (20 July 2026 – present); Secretary of State for Culture, Media and Sport (5 July 2024 – 20 July 2026)
Wimbledon	Conservative	Paul Kohler	Liberal Democrats	Previous incumbent, Stephen Hammond, did not stand
Winchester	Conservative	Danny Chambers	Liberal Democrats	Previous incumbent, Steve Brine, did not stand
Windsor	Conservative	Jack Rankin	Conservative	Previous incumbent, Adam Afriyie, did not stand
Wirral West	Labour	Matthew Patrick	Labour	Previous incumbent, Margaret Greenwood, did not stand
Witham	Conservative	Priti Patel	Conservative	
Witney	Conservative	Charlie Maynard	Liberal Democrats	Defeated incumbent, Robert Courts
Woking	Conservative	Will Forster	Liberal Democrats	Defeated incumbent, Jonathan Lord
Wokingham	Conservative	Clive Jones	Liberal Democrats	Previous incumbent, John Redwood, did not stand
Wolverhampton North East	Conservative	Sureena Brackenridge	Labour	Defeated incumbent, Jane Stevenson
Wolverhampton South East	Labour	Pat McFadden	Labour	Seat held. Nominal gain following boundary changes. Chancellor of the Duchy of Lancaster (5 July 2024 – 5 September 2025); Minister for Intergovernmental Relations (5 September 2024 – 6 September 2025); Secretary of State for Work and Pensions (5 September 2025 – present)
Wolverhampton West	Conservative	Warinder Juss	Labour	Previous incumbent for the predecessor seat of Wolverhampton South West, Stuart Anderson, stood successfully in South Shropshire
Worcester	Conservative	Tom Collins	Labour	Previous incumbent, Robin Walker, did not stand
Worsley and Eccles	Labour	Michael Wheeler	Labour	Previous incumbent, Barbara Keeley, did not stand
Worthing West	Conservative	Beccy Cooper	Labour	Defeated incumbent, Peter Bottomley
Wrexham	Conservative	Andrew Ranger	Labour	Defeated incumbent, Sarah Atherton
Wycombe	Conservative	Emma Reynolds	Labour	Defeated incumbent, Steve Baker; Chief Secretary to the Treasury (20 July 2026 – present); Secretary of State for Environment, Food and Rural Affairs (5 September 2025 – 20 July 2026)
Wyre Forest	Conservative	Mark Garnier	Conservative	
Wythenshawe and Sale East	Labour	Mike Kane	Labour	
Yeovil	Conservative	Adam Dance	Liberal Democrats	Defeated incumbent, Marcus Fysh
Ynys Môn	Conservative	Llinos Medi	Plaid Cymru	Defeated incumbent, Virginia Crosbie
York Central	Labour	Rachael Maskell	Labour Co-op	
York Outer	Conservative	Luke Charters	Labour	Defeated incumbent, Julian Sturdy

== By-elections ==
Constituency	Date	Incumbent	Party	Winner	Party	Cause
Runcorn and Helsby	1 May 2025	Mike Amesbury	Labour (Note: Elected as Labour, sitting as an independent MP at the time of their resignation.)	Sarah Pochin	Reform	Resigned following conviction of assaulting a man
Gorton and Denton	26 February 2026	Andrew Gwynne	Labour Co-op (Note: Elected as Labour Co-op, sitting as an independent MP at the time of their resignation.)	Hannah Spencer	Green	Resigned, citing ill health
Aberdeen South	18 June 2026	Stephen Flynn	SNP	Douglas Lumsden	Conservative	Resigned after being elected to the Scottish Parliament for Aberdeen Deeside and North Kincardine
Arbroath and Broughty Ferry	18 June 2026	Stephen Gethins	SNP	Lara Bird	SNP	Resigned after being elected to the Scottish Parliament for Dundee City East
Makerfield	18 June 2026	Josh Simons	Labour	Andy Burnham	Labour Co-op	Resigned to allow Andy Burnham to return to Parliament
Clacton	13 August 2026	Nigel Farage	Reform	Nigel Farage	Reform	Resigned to contest by-election after controversy over his finances
Holborn and St Pancras	8 October 2026	Keir Starmer	Labour	Sagal Abdi-Wali	Labour	Resigned to focus on "international affairs" following his resignation as Prime Minister.

== Defections, suspensions and resignations ==
The label under which MPs sit in the House of Commons can change if they leave or are suspended from or expelled by their party. When suspended, they effectively become independents.

Name	Date	From	To	Constituency	Reason
Zarah Sultana	23 July 2024	Labour	Independent	Coventry South	Whip suspended (initially for six months) after voting against the government retaining the two-child benefit cap. Resigned from Labour to form a new party along with Jeremy Corbyn but first joined the Independent Alliance. Officially listed as Your Party from November 2025.
Zarah Sultana	24 July 2025	Independent	Ind. Alliance	Coventry South	Whip suspended (initially for six months) after voting against the government retaining the two-child benefit cap. Resigned from Labour to form a new party along with Jeremy Corbyn but first joined the Independent Alliance. Officially listed as Your Party from November 2025.
Zarah Sultana	18 November 2025	Ind. Alliance	Your Party	Coventry South	Whip suspended (initially for six months) after voting against the government retaining the two-child benefit cap. Resigned from Labour to form a new party along with Jeremy Corbyn but first joined the Independent Alliance. Officially listed as Your Party from November 2025.
Richard Burgon	23 July 2024	Labour	Independent	Leeds East	Whip suspended for six months after voting against the government retaining the two-child benefit cap. Reinstated.
Richard Burgon	5 February 2025	Independent	Labour	Leeds East	Whip suspended for six months after voting against the government retaining the two-child benefit cap. Reinstated.
Ian Byrne	23 July 2024	Labour	Independent	Liverpool West Derby	Whip suspended for six months after voting against the government retaining the two-child benefit cap. Reinstated.
Ian Byrne	5 February 2025	Independent	Labour	Liverpool West Derby	Whip suspended for six months after voting against the government retaining the two-child benefit cap. Reinstated.
Imran Hussain	23 July 2024	Labour	Independent	Bradford East	Whip suspended for six months after voting against the government retaining the two-child benefit cap. Reinstated.
Imran Hussain	5 February 2025	Independent	Labour	Bradford East	Whip suspended for six months after voting against the government retaining the two-child benefit cap. Reinstated.
Rebecca Long-Bailey	23 July 2024	Labour	Independent	Salford	Whip suspended for six months after voting against the government retaining the two-child benefit cap. Reinstated.
Rebecca Long-Bailey	5 February 2025	Independent	Labour	Salford	Whip suspended for six months after voting against the government retaining the two-child benefit cap. Reinstated.
Apsana Begum	23 July 2024	Labour	Independent	Poplar and Limehouse	Whip suspended for six months after voting against the government retaining the two-child benefit cap. Reinstated.
Apsana Begum	27 September 2025	Independent	Labour	Poplar and Limehouse	Whip suspended for six months after voting against the government retaining the two-child benefit cap. Reinstated.
John McDonnell	23 July 2024	Labour	Independent	Hayes and Harlington	Whip suspended for six months after voting against the government retaining the two-child benefit cap. Reinstated.
John McDonnell	27 September 2025	Independent	Labour	Hayes and Harlington	Whip suspended for six months after voting against the government retaining the two-child benefit cap. Reinstated.
Jeremy Corbyn	2 September 2024	Independent	Ind. Alliance	Islington North	Formed technical group opposing austerity, two-child benefit cap, and arms sales to Israel. Was a member of Your Party but was listed as an independent until June 2026. Elected as parliamentary leader of Your Party in March 2026.
Jeremy Corbyn	10 June 2026	Ind. Alliance	Your Party	Islington North	Formed technical group opposing austerity, two-child benefit cap, and arms sales to Israel. Was a member of Your Party but was listed as an independent until June 2026. Elected as parliamentary leader of Your Party in March 2026.
Shockat Adam	2 September 2024	Independent	Ind. Alliance	Leicester South	Formed technical group opposing austerity, two-child benefit cap, and arms sales to Israel. Adam and Khan are members of Your Party but remain listed as independents.
Adnan Hussain	2 September 2024	Independent	Ind. Alliance	Blackburn	Formed technical group opposing austerity, two-child benefit cap, and arms sales to Israel. Adam and Khan are members of Your Party but remain listed as independents.
Ayoub Khan	2 September 2024	Independent	Ind. Alliance	Birmingham Perry Barr	Formed technical group opposing austerity, two-child benefit cap, and arms sales to Israel. Adam and Khan are members of Your Party but remain listed as independents.
Iqbal Mohamed	2 September 2024	Independent	Ind. Alliance	Dewsbury and Batley	Formed technical group opposing austerity, two-child benefit cap, and arms sales to Israel. Adam and Khan are members of Your Party but remain listed as independents.
Rosie Duffield	28 September 2024	Labour	Independent	Canterbury	Resigned from Labour, citing the freebies controversy.
Mike Amesbury	27 October 2024	Labour	Independent	Runcorn and Helsby	Suspended from Labour after altercation with constituent. Resigned from Labour after pleading guilty to common assault in January 2025 and as an MP two months later.
Mike Amesbury	17 March 2025	Independent	Resigned	Runcorn and Helsby	Suspended from Labour after altercation with constituent. Resigned from Labour after pleading guilty to common assault in January 2025 and as an MP two months later.
Andrew Gwynne	8 February 2025	Labour Co-op	Independent	Gorton and Denton	Suspended from Labour after discovery of insulting messages about constituents and party colleagues. Resigned in January 2026, citing ill health.
Andrew Gwynne	23 January 2026	Independent	Resigned	Gorton and Denton	Suspended from Labour after discovery of insulting messages about constituents and party colleagues. Resigned in January 2026, citing ill health.
Oliver Ryan	10 February 2025	Labour Co-op	Independent	Burnley	Suspended from Labour after being the second MP named as being part of the WhatsApp scandal. Reinstated.
Oliver Ryan	2 September 2025	Independent	Labour Co-op	Burnley	Suspended from Labour after being the second MP named as being part of the WhatsApp scandal. Reinstated.
Rupert Lowe	7 March 2025	Reform	Independent	Great Yarmouth	Suspended from Reform UK after alleged bullying and verbal abuse of two female staff members and alleged threats to Reform Chairman, Zia Yusuf. Announced formation of a new party in February 2026. Officially listed as Restore Britain from March 2026.
Rupert Lowe	20 March 2026	Independent	Restore	Great Yarmouth	Suspended from Reform UK after alleged bullying and verbal abuse of two female staff members and alleged threats to Reform Chairman, Zia Yusuf. Announced formation of a new party in February 2026. Officially listed as Restore Britain from March 2026.
Dan Norris	4 April 2025	Labour	Independent	North East Somerset and Hanham	Suspended from Labour after being arrested on suspicion of rape and child sex offences.
Patrick Spencer	13 May 2025	Conservative	Independent	Central Suffolk and North Ipswich	Suspended after being charged with two counts of sexual assault. Reinstated after being found not guilty.
Patrick Spencer	17 July 2026	Independent	Conservative	Central Suffolk and North Ipswich	Suspended after being charged with two counts of sexual assault. Reinstated after being found not guilty.
James McMurdock	5 July 2025	Reform	Independent	South Basildon and East Thurrock	Removed the party whip from himself over an investigation into alleged business impropriety during the COVID-19 pandemic.
Neil Duncan-Jordan	16 July 2025	Labour	Independent	Poole	Suspended for "breaches of party discipline" after voting against the government on welfare reforms. Reinstated.
Neil Duncan-Jordan	7 November 2025	Independent	Labour	Poole	Suspended for "breaches of party discipline" after voting against the government on welfare reforms. Reinstated.
Chris Hinchliff	16 July 2025	Labour	Independent	North East Hertfordshire	Suspended for "breaches of party discipline" after voting against the government on welfare reforms. Reinstated.
Chris Hinchliff	7 November 2025	Independent	Labour	North East Hertfordshire	Suspended for "breaches of party discipline" after voting against the government on welfare reforms. Reinstated.
Brian Leishman	16 July 2025	Labour	Independent	Alloa and Grangemouth	Suspended for "breaches of party discipline" after voting against the government on welfare reforms. Reinstated.
Brian Leishman	7 November 2025	Independent	Labour	Alloa and Grangemouth	Suspended for "breaches of party discipline" after voting against the government on welfare reforms. Reinstated.
Rachael Maskell	16 July 2025	Labour Co-op	Independent	York Central	Suspended for "breaches of party discipline" after voting against the government on welfare reforms. Reinstated.
Rachael Maskell	7 November 2025	Independent	Labour Co-op	York Central	Suspended for "breaches of party discipline" after voting against the government on welfare reforms. Reinstated.
Diane Abbott	17 July 2025	Labour	Independent	Hackney North and Stoke Newington	Suspended after a BBC Sounds interview in which she retracted an apology she had earlier made over remarks about racism in a 2023 editorial in The Observer. Reinstated.
Diane Abbott	30 July 2026	Independent	Labour	Hackney North and Stoke Newington	Suspended after a BBC Sounds interview in which she retracted an apology she had earlier made over remarks about racism in a 2023 editorial in The Observer. Reinstated.
Danny Kruger	15 September 2025	Conservative	Reform	East Wiltshire	Defected to Reform UK.
Markus Campbell-Savours	3 December 2025	Labour	Independent	Penrith and Solway	Suspended after voting against plans to extend inheritance tax to farmers. Reinstated.
Markus Campbell-Savours	6 March 2026	Independent	Labour	Penrith and Solway	Suspended after voting against plans to extend inheritance tax to farmers. Reinstated.
Robert Jenrick	15 January 2026	Conservative	Independent	Newark	Suspended after evidence presented to party leader that he was plotting to defect to another party. Joined Reform UK later that same day.
Robert Jenrick	15 January 2026	Independent	Reform	Newark	Suspended after evidence presented to party leader that he was plotting to defect to another party. Joined Reform UK later that same day.
Andrew Rosindell	18 January 2026	Conservative	Reform	Romford	Defected to Reform UK.
Suella Braverman	26 January 2026	Conservative	Reform	Fareham and Waterlooville	Defected to Reform UK.
Joani Reid	5 March 2026	Labour	Independent	East Kilbride and Strathaven	Voluntarily suspended herself following arrest of husband on suspicion of spying for China. Whip returned after investigation
Joani Reid	30 July 2026	Independent	Labour	East Kilbride and Strathaven	Voluntarily suspended herself following arrest of husband on suspicion of spying for China. Whip returned after investigation
Karl Turner	31 March 2026	Labour	Independent	Kingston upon Hull East	Suspended for "uncollegiate" comments and opposing government plans to limit jury trials. Reinstated after a public apology.
Karl Turner	21 October 2026	Independent	Labour	Kingston upon Hull East	Suspended for "uncollegiate" comments and opposing government plans to limit jury trials. Reinstated after a public apology.
Stephen Flynn	14 May 2026	SNP	Resigned	Aberdeen South	Resigned following election to the Scottish Parliament
Stephen Gethins	14 May 2026	SNP	Resigned	Arbroath and Broughty Ferry	Resigned following election to the Scottish Parliament
Josh Simons	18 May 2026	Labour	Resigned	Makerfield	Resigned following poor local election results for Labour, citing a wish for Andy Burnham to stand in the resultant by-election and return to Parliament.
Cameron Thomas	18 June 2026	Liberal Democrats	Independent	Tewkesbury	Suspended amidst police investigation and arrest.
Nigel Farage	8 July 2026	Reform	Resigned	Clacton	Resigned amid controversy over finances, stating that he would stand in the subsequent by-election.
Bayo Alaba	17 August 2026	Labour	Independent	Southend East and Rochford	Suspended amidst allegation of attempting to not repay Covid-19 pandemic bounceback loan.
Keir Starmer	1 September 2026	Labour	Resigned	Holborn and St Pancras	Resigned to focus on "international affairs" following his resignation as Prime Minister.
Perran Moon	20 October 2026	Labour	Independent	Camborne and Redruth	Suspended amidst allegation of attempting to not repay Covid-19 pandemic bounceback loan.
Carla Lockhart	2 November 2026	DUP	Independent	Upper Bann	Resigned whip in a row over the party's response to the Drumcree parading dispute.

== Progression of government majority and party totals ==
Date	Event	Majority	Working majority	Voting MPs																Non-voting MPs				Vacant seats
Date	Event	Majority	Working majority	Lab	Con	LD	SNP	DUP	Ref	Grn	PC	SDLP	APNI	TUV	UUP	Your	RB	IA	Ind	SF	Spk	Lab	Con	Vacant seats
4 July 2024	General election	174	181	411 +1	121	72	9	5	5	4	4	2	1	1	1	0	0	0	6	7	0	0	0	0
9 July 2024	Hoyle re-elected Speaker	173	180	411	121	72	9	5	5	4	4	2	1	1	1	0	0	0	6	7	1	0	0	0
23 July 2024	Deputy Speakers elected	174	181	410	119	72	9	5	5	4	4	2	1	1	1	0	0	0	6	7	1	1	2	0
23 July 2024	7 Labour MPs lose whip (Note: Apsana Begum, Richard Burgon, Ian Byrne, Imran Hussain, Rebecca Long-Bailey, John McDonnell and Zarah Sultana.)	160	167	403	119	72	9	5	5	4	4	2	1	1	1	0	0	0	13	7	1	1	2	0
2 September 2024	5 independent MPs form Independent Alliance	160	167	403	119	72	9	5	5	4	4	2	1	1	1	0	0	5	8	7	1	1	2	0
28 September 2024	Duffield leaves Labour	158	165	402	119	72	9	5	5	4	4	2	1	1	1	0	0	5	9	7	1	1	2	0
27 October 2024	Amesbury has whip suspended	156	163	401	119	72	9	5	5	4	4	2	1	1	1	0	0	5	10	7	1	1	2	0
5 February 2025	4 ex-Labour MPs readmitted to Labour (Note: Richard Burgon, Ian Byrne, Imran Hussain and Rebecca Long-Bailey)	164	171	405	119	72	9	5	5	4	4	2	1	1	1	0	0	5	6	7	1	1	2	0
8 February 2025	Gwynne has membership suspended	162	169	404	119	72	9	5	5	4	4	2	1	1	1	0	0	5	7	7	1	1	2	0
10 February 2025	Ryan has membership suspended	160	167	403	119	72	9	5	5	4	4	2	1	1	1	0	0	5	8	7	1	1	2	0
7 March 2025	Lowe has whip suspended	160	167	403	119	72	9	5	4	4	4	2	1	1	1	0	0	5	9	7	1	1	2	0
17 March 2025	Amesbury resigns as an MP	161	168	403	119	72	9	5	4	4	4	2	1	1	1	0	0	5	8	7	1	1	2	1
4 April 2025	Norris has whip suspended	159	166	402	119	72	9	5	4	4	4	2	1	1	1	0	0	5	9	7	1	1	2	1
1 May 2025	Pochin elected in Runcorn and Helsby	158	165	402	119	72	9	5	5	4	4	2	1	1	1	0	0	5	9	7	1	1	2	0
13 May 2025	P. Spencer has whip suspended	158	165	402	118	72	9	5	5	4	4	2	1	1	1	0	0	5	10	7	1	1	2	0
5 July 2025	McMurdock resigns whip	158	165	402	118	72	9	5	4	4	4	2	1	1	1	0	0	5	11	7	1	1	2	0
16 July 2025	4 Labour MPs lose whip (Note: Neil Duncan-Jordan, Chris Hinchliff, Brian Leishman and Rachael Maskell)	150	157	398	118	72	9	5	4	4	4	2	1	1	1	0	0	5	15	7	1	1	2	0
17 July 2025	Abbott suspended from Labour Party	148	155	397	118	72	9	5	4	4	4	2	1	1	1	0	0	5	16	7	1	1	2	0
24 July 2025	Sultana joins Independent Alliance	148	155	397	118	72	9	5	4	4	4	2	1	1	1	0	0	6	15	7	1	1	2	0
2 September 2025	Ryan has Labour whip returned	150	157	398	118	72	9	5	4	4	4	2	1	1	1	0	0	6	14	7	1	1	2	0
15 September 2025	Kruger defects to Reform	150	157	398	117	72	9	5	5	4	4	2	1	1	1	0	0	6	14	7	1	1	2	0
26 September 2025	McDonnell and Begum have Labour whip returned	154	161	400	117	72	9	5	5	4	4	2	1	1	1	0	0	6	12	7	1	1	2	0
7 November 2025	4 MPs have Labour whip restored	162	169	404	117	72	9	5	5	4	4	2	1	1	1	0	0	6	8	7	1	1	2	0
18 November 2025	Sultana moves to Your Party	162	169	404	117	72	9	5	5	4	4	2	1	1	1	1	0	5	8	7	1	1	2	0
3 December 2025	Campbell-Savours suspended	160	167	403	117	72	9	5	5	4	4	2	1	1	1	1	0	5	9	7	1	1	2	0
15 January 2026	Jenrick has whip suspended	160	167	403	116	72	9	5	5	4	4	2	1	1	1	1	0	5	10	7	1	1	2	0
15 January 2026	Jenrick joins Reform	160	167	403	116	72	9	5	6	4	4	2	1	1	1	1	0	5	9	7	1	1	2	0
18 January 2026	Rosindell defects to Reform	160	167	403	115	72	9	5	7	4	4	2	1	1	1	1	0	5	9	7	1	1	2	0
23 January 2026	Gwynne resigns as an MP	161	168	403	115	72	9	5	7	4	4	2	1	1	1	1	0	5	8	7	1	1	2	1
26 January 2026	Braverman defects to Reform	161	168	403	114	72	9	5	8	4	4	2	1	1	1	1	0	5	8	7	1	1	2	1
26 February 2026	H. Spencer elected in Gorton and Denton	160	167	403	114	72	9	5	8	5	4	2	1	1	1	1	0	5	8	7	1	1	2	0
5 March 2026	Reid resigns whip	158	165	402	114	72	9	5	8	5	4	2	1	1	1	1	0	5	9	7	1	1	2	0
6 March 2026	Campbell-Savours has whip restored	160	167	403	114	72	9	5	8	5	4	2	1	1	1	1	0	5	8	7	1	1	2	0
20 March 2026	Lowe moves to Restore Britain	160	167	403	114	72	9	5	8	5	4	2	1	1	1	1	1	5	7	7	1	1	2	0
31 March 2026	Turner loses whip	158	165	402	114	72	9	5	8	5	4	2	1	1	1	1	1	5	8	7	1	1	2	0
14 May 2026	Gethins & Flynn resign	160	167	402	114	72	7	5	8	5	4	2	1	1	1	1	1	5	8	7	1	1	2	2
18 May 2026	Simons resigns	159	166	401	114	72	7	5	8	5	4	2	1	1	1	1	1	5	8	7	1	1	2	3
10 June 2026	Corbyn moves to Your Party	159	166	401	114	72	7	5	8	5	4	2	1	1	1	2	1	4	8	7	1	1	2	3
18 June 2026	Thomas has whip suspended	159	166	401	114	71	7	5	8	5	4	2	1	1	1	2	1	4	9	7	1	1	2	3
19 June 2026	Bird, Burnham, Lumsden elected in by-elections	158	165	402	115	71	8	5	8	5	4	2	1	1	1	2	1	4	9	7	1	1	2	0
8 July 2026	Farage resigns	159	166	402	115	71	8	5	7	5	4	2	1	1	1	2	1	4	9	7	1	1	2	1
17 July 2026	P. Spencer has whip restored	159	166	402	116	71	8	5	7	5	4	2	1	1	1	2	1	4	8	7	1	1	2	1
30 July 2026	Abbott and Reid have whip restored	162	169	404	116	71	8	5	7	5	4	2	1	1	1	2	1	4	6	7	1	1	2	1
13 August 2026	Farage elected in Clacton	161	168	404	116	71	8	5	8	5	4	2	1	1	1	2	1	4	6	7	1	1	2	0
17 August 2026	Alaba suspended	160	167	403	116	71	8	5	8	5	4	2	1	1	1	2	1	4	7	7	1	1	2	0
1 September 2026	Starmer resigns	159	166	402	116	71	8	5	8	5	4	2	1	1	1	2	1	4	7	7	1	1	2	1
8 October 2026	Abdi-Wali elected in Holborn and St Pancras	160	167	403	116	71	8	5	8	5	4	2	1	1	1	2	1	4	7	7	1	1	2	0
20 October 2026	Moon suspended	159	166	402	116	71	8	5	8	5	4	2	1	1	1	2	1	4	8	7	1	1	2	0
21 October 2026	Turner has whip restored	160	167	403	116	71	8	5	8	5	4	2	1	1	1	2	1	4	7	7	1	1	2	0
2 November 2026	Lockhart leaves DUP	160	167	403	116	71	8	4	8	5	4	2	1	1	1	2	1	4	8	7	1	1	2	0

== Select committee chairs ==
The chairs of the 26 select committees were elected in September 2024.
Select Committee	Chair	Party	Constituency
Business and Trade	Liam Byrne	Labour	Birmingham Hodge Hill and Solihull North
Culture, Media and Sport	Caroline Dinenage	Conservative	Gosport
Defence	Tan Dhesi	Labour	Slough
Education	Helen Hayes	Labour	Dulwich and West Norwood
Energy Security and Net Zero	Bill Esterson	Labour	Sefton Central
Environmental Audit	Toby Perkins	Labour	Chesterfield
Environment, Food and Rural Affairs	Alistair Carmichael	Liberal Democrats	Orkney and Shetland
Finance	Steve Barclay	Conservative	North East Cambridgeshire
Foreign Affairs	Emily Thornberry	Labour	Islington South and Finsbury
Health and Social Care	Layla Moran	Liberal Democrats	Oxford West and Abingdon
Home Affairs	Karen Bradley	Conservative	Staffordshire Moorlands
Housing, Communities and Local Government	Florence Eshalomi	Labour Co-op	Vauxhall and Camberwell Green
International Development	Sarah Champion	Labour	Rotherham
Justice	Andy Slaughter	Labour	Hammersmith and Chiswick
Northern Ireland	Tonia Antoniazzi	Labour	Gower
Petitions	Jamie Stone	Liberal Democrats	Caithness, Sutherland and Easter Ross
Procedure	Cat Smith	Labour	Lancaster and Wyre
Public Accounts	Geoffrey Clifton-Brown	Conservative	North Cotswolds
Public Administration and Constitutional Affairs	Simon Hoare	Conservative	North Dorset
Science, Innovation and Technology	Chi Onwurah	Labour	Newcastle upon Tyne Central and West
Scottish Affairs	Patricia Ferguson	Labour	Glasgow West
Standards	Alberto Costa	Conservative	South Leicestershire
Transport	Ruth Cadbury	Labour	Brentford and Isleworth
Treasury	Meg Hillier	Labour Co-op	Hackney South and Shoreditch
Welsh Affairs	Ruth Jones	Labour	Newport West and Islwyn
Women and Equalities	Sarah Owen	Labour	Luton North
Work and Pensions	Debbie Abrahams	Labour	Oldham East and Saddleworth

== See also ==
- List of United Kingdom MPs by seniority (2024–present)
