= Peter Bedford =

Peter Bedford may refer to:

- Peter Bedford (sportsman) (born 1947), Australian rules footballer and cricketer
- Peter Bedford (politician) (born 1986), British politician
- Peter Bedford (Home and Away), fictional character
