= Melton and Syston =

UK Parliament constituency (since 2024)

- County constituency for the House of Commons
- Interactive map of boundaries since 2024
- Location within the East Midlands
- County: Leicestershire
- Electorate: 71,615 (March 2020)
- Major settlements: Melton Mowbray, Sileby, Syston

Current constituency
- Created: 2024
- Member of Parliament: Edward Argar (Conservative)
- Seats: One
- Created from: Rutland and Melton, Charnwood, Loughborough

Melton and Syston is a county constituency of the House of Commons in the UK Parliament. It was first contested at the 2024 general election. The seat is currently represented by Edward Argar of the Conservative Party. Argar previously represented the former constituency of Charnwood.

== Constituency profile ==
Melton and Syston is a constituency in Leicestershire. Its largest town is Melton Mowbray, which has a population of around 29,000. Other settlements include the small town of Syston and the villages of Thurmaston, Queniborough, Sileby, Asfordby and Bottesford.

This is a large, rural constituency with many small villages. The area has a significant food industry; Melton Mowbray promotes itself as the country's "rural capital of food" and is known for its production of pork pies, and Syston is home to the headquarters of Pukka Pies. The constituency contains three of the six dairies in the country licensed to manufacture Stilton cheese, at Melton Mowbray and the villages of Long Clawson and Saxelbye. Syston, Queniborough and Thurmaston lie on the outskirts of Leicester and form part of the city's wider urban area. The constituency is generally affluent with low levels of deprivation. House prices are lower than the national average but higher than the rest of the East Midlands.

In general, residents of Melton and Syston are older and have high rates of homeownership. Levels of income and education are average, and a high proportion of residents work in manufacturing and professional occupations. Rates of unemployment and child poverty are low. White people made up 89% of the population at the 2021 census. Asians, most of whom were of Indian origin, were the largest ethnic minority group at 8%, although they made up around a third of the population in Thurmaston.

At the local council level, most of the constituency is represented by Conservatives, with some Green Party councillors in the villages and rural areas north of Syston and some Labour Party representatives in Melton Mowbray. At the county council, which held elections in 2025, Melton Mowbray elected Reform UK councillors. Voters in Melton and Syston strongly supported leaving the European Union in the 2016 referendum; an estimated 60% voted in favour of Brexit compared to 52% nationwide.

== Boundaries ==
Further to the 2023 review of Westminster constituencies, the composition of the constituency was defined as follows (as they existed on 1 December 2020):

- The Borough of Charnwood wards of: East Goscote; Queniborough; Sileby; Syston East; Syston West; Thurmaston; Wreake Villages.
- The Borough of Melton.

It includes the following areas:

- The whole of the Borough of Melton, including the town of Melton Mowbray, transferred from Rutland and Melton (abolished, with Rutland now included in Rutland and Stamford).
- Syston, East Goscote and Thurmaston, transferred from Charnwood (abolished and largely replaced by Mid Leicestershire)
- Sileby, transferred from Loughborough.

Following a local government boundary review in Charnwood which came into effect in May 2023, the constituency now comprises the following from the 2024 general election:

- The Borough of Charnwood wards of: Sileby & Seagrave (most); South Charnwood; Syston; Thurmaston; Wreake Valley.
- The Borough of Melton.

== Members of Parliament ==
Rutland and Melton, Charnwood and Loughborough prior to 2024

Election	Member	Party
2024	Edward Argar	Conservative

== Elections ==
=== Elections in the 2020s ===
General election 2024: Melton and Syston
Party	Candidate	Votes	%	±%
Conservative	Edward Argar	17,526	38.1	−25.2
Labour	Zafran Khan	12,130	26.4	+2.9
Reform	Peter Morris	8,945	19.5	N/A
Green	Alastair McQuillan	3,685	8.0	+2.5
Liberal Democrats	Andy Konieczko	2,547	5.5	−2.2
Independent	Marilyn Gordon	517	1.1	N/A
ADF	Teck Khong	348	0.8	N/A
Rejoin EU	Matt Shouler	288	0.6	N/A
Majority		5,396	11.7	−28.1
Turnout		45,986	61.9	−4.8
Registered electors		74,316		
Conservative win (new seat)				
