= Edward Argar =

British politician

The Right Honourable Edward Argar MP
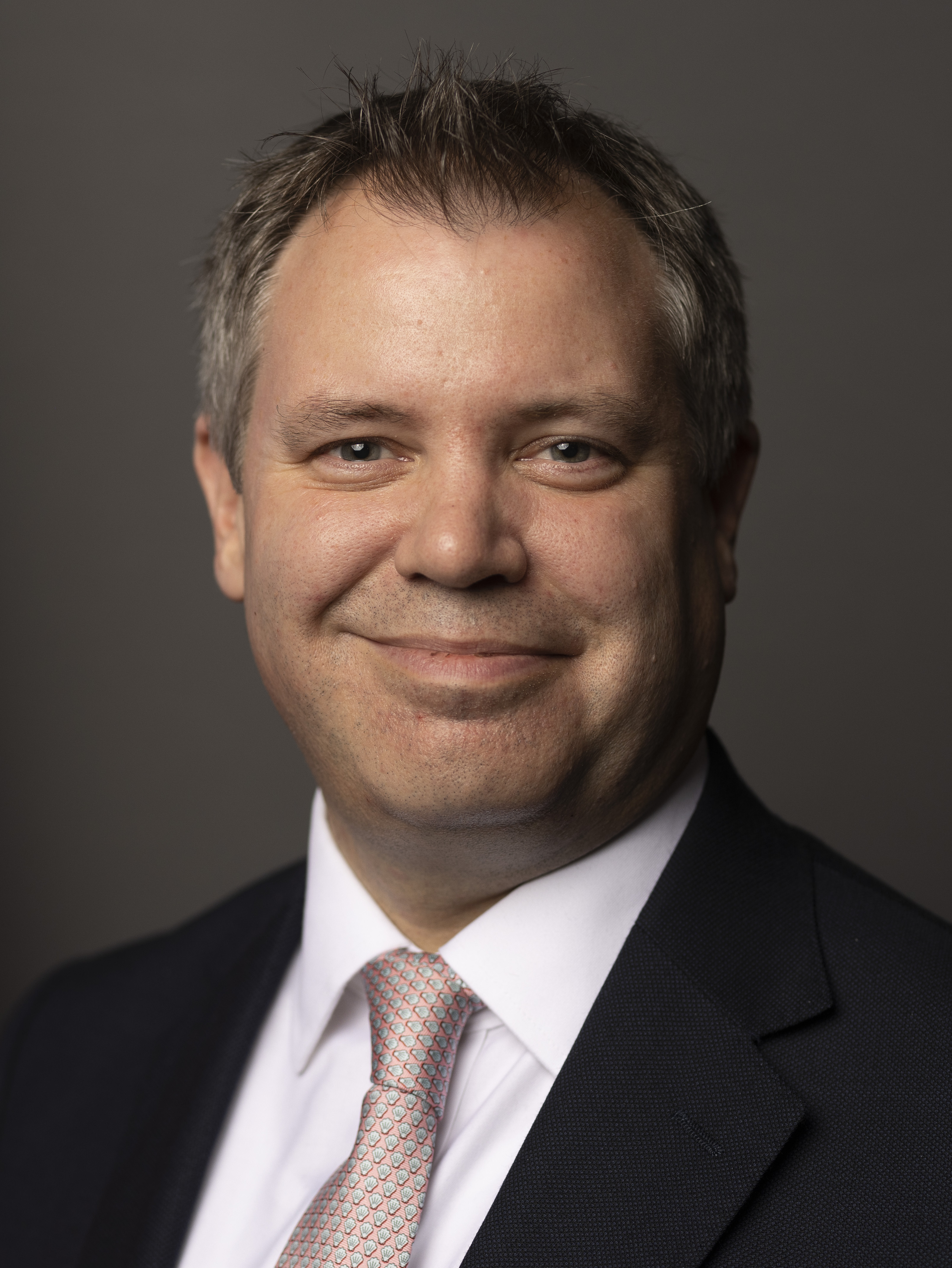
- Official portrait, 2022

Shadow Secretary of State for Health and Social Care
- In office 5 November 2024 – 22 July 2025
- Leader: Kemi Badenoch
- Preceded by: Victoria Atkins
- Succeeded by: Stuart Andrew

Shadow Secretary of State for Justice Shadow Lord Chancellor
- In office 8 July 2024 – 4 November 2024
- Leader: Rishi Sunak
- Preceded by: Shabana Mahmood
- Succeeded by: Robert Jenrick

Minister of State for Prisons, Parole and Probation
- In office 13 November 2023 – 5 July 2024
- Prime Minister: Rishi Sunak
- Preceded by: Damian Hinds
- Succeeded by: The Lord Timpson

Parliamentary Under-Secretary of State for Victims and Sentencing (Note: Parliamentary Under-Secretary of State from 2018 to 2019)
- In office 27 October 2022 – 13 November 2023
- Prime Minister: Rishi Sunak
- Preceded by: Rachel Maclean
- Succeeded by: Laura Farris (Victims); Gareth Bacon (Sentencing)
- In office 14 June 2018 – 10 September 2019
- Prime Minister: Theresa May; Boris Johnson
- Preceded by: Phillip Lee (Victims); Sam Gyimah (Sentencing)
- Succeeded by: Chris Philp

Chief Secretary to the Treasury
- In office 14 October 2022 – 25 October 2022
- Prime Minister: Liz Truss
- Chancellor: Jeremy Hunt
- Preceded by: Chris Philp
- Succeeded by: John Glen

Minister for the Cabinet Office Paymaster General
- In office 6 September 2022 – 14 October 2022
- Prime Minister: Liz Truss
- Preceded by: Michael Ellis
- Succeeded by: Chris Philp

Minister of State for Health
- In office 10 September 2019 – 6 July 2022
- Prime Minister: Boris Johnson
- Preceded by: Chris Skidmore
- Succeeded by: Maria Caulfield

Member of Parliament for Melton and Syston Charnwood (2015–2024)
- Incumbent
- Assumed office 7 May 2015
- Preceded by: Stephen Dorrell
- Majority: 5,396 (11.7%)

Personal details
- Born: 9 December 1977 (age 48) Ashford, Kent, England
- Party: Conservative
- Education: Oriel College, Oxford
- Website: www.edwardargar.org.uk

Edward John Comport Argar (born 9 December 1977) is a British politician who was Shadow Secretary of State for Justice and Shadow Lord Chancellor from July to November 2024. He most recently served as Minister of State for Prisons, Parole and Probation from November 2023 to July 2024 and as Chief Secretary to the Treasury in October 2022.

A member of the Conservative Party, he previously served as Parliamentary Under-Secretary of State for Justice from 2018 to 2019, Minister of State for Health from 2019 to 2022, and as Paymaster General from September to October 2022. Argar was the Member of Parliament (MP) for Charnwood from the 2015 general election until the seat was abolished for the 2024 general election.

He subsequently stood for election in the newly formed Melton and Syston seat in which he was elected.

== Early life ==
Argar was born in Ashford, Kent, and educated at the Harvey Grammar School, before earning a 2:1 in modern history at Oriel College, Oxford.

== Early career and Westminster council career ==
After leaving university, he spent four years working as Press Secretary for Shadow Foreign Secretary Michael Ancram, who at the time shared an office with then Shadow Cabinet Minister Sir Alan Duncan.

After working for Ancram, he worked for Hedra, a management consultancy which was taken over by Mouchel. In February 2013, he was elected onto the South East Regional Council of the CBI, describing himself as 'Head of Public Affairs, Serco UK & Europe'.

He became a Conservative member of Westminster City Council in 2006 and a cabinet member in 2008. He contested the council leadership in 2012, but lost to Philippa Roe.

=== Parliament ===
He stood in Oxford East in the 2010 general election, with his election leaflet promising a Conservative government would deliver a fairer society with improved public services and more NHS investment. However, he was defeated by Andrew Smith, the former Work and Pensions minister. Argar subsequently attended selections in the constituencies of Newark, Tonbridge and Malling, Wealden and Mid Worcestershire, before being selected to contest the safe seat of Charnwood previously held by Stephen Dorrell; a Daily Telegraph article praising open primaries referred to him as a "serial candidate". The Leicester Mercury, noting his selection had attracted criticism, asked whether Parliamentary candidates should have a link to the constituency.

Argar gave his maiden speech on 4 June 2015. He praised his predecessor, Stephen Dorrell and described the constituency as a post 2010 success story but said he would be "continuing to campaign for fairer funding ... for its schools." On other issues, he said that although the Government had made significant progress in dementia care and mental health provision, more was needed and he promised to vocally support those committed to further improvement. However he was there to represent the whole community in Charnwood, including those on the fringes and he passionately believed in one-nationism. Argar was opposed to Brexit prior to the 2016 referendum.

==== Dementia awareness campaign ====
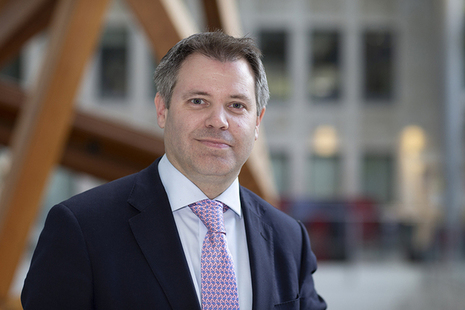
Edward Argar MP

Argar opened a debate on dementia in September 2015. He praised the work done by the previous Labour government in formulating a dementia strategy and described a visit to a Syston community centre. He said some 21m people have a close friend or family member with the disease, and stated that the government has committed £66m to research. He also paid tribute to the Alzheimer's Society, Alzheimer's Research UK and Age UK for their work.

Writing in the Tribune in October 2015, Argar put the annual cost of the disease, which affects 850,000 people, at £23 billion, and argued for government departments, including hospitals, to become dementia-friendly places. He hoped Leicestershire County Council, which had amongst the lowest Government funding, would get a better deal to help provide care support for rural areas. According to Argar, people with dementia stay 20% longer than average in hospitals, and he expressed concern that 41% of hospitals do not include awareness training during staff induction.

=== Ministerial career ===
Argar was appointed Parliamentary Private Secretary to the Home Secretary in the January 2019 reshuffle. He was later appointed Under-Secretary of State for Justice in June 2018 replacing Philip Lee. Argar was appointed Minister of State at the Department of Health and Social Care on 10 September 2019. Argar was previously Parliamentary Under Secretary of State at the Ministry of Justice between 14 June 2018 and 10 September 2019. The website Conservative Home noted that by appointing someone who always followed the party line, Theresa May had missed an opportunity to silence a potential critic. The Law Gazette described him as 'a little-known backbencher' and said that like Lee his role would include responsibility for treatment of women and child offenders.

Argar's appointment as Minister of State for Health preceded the start of the COVID-19 virus arrival in January 2020. In June 2020, Argar was interviewed by Nick Robinson on the BBC Today programme. His new quarantine policy was designed to stop travellers from high risk countries from importing the disease. However, asked three times to name European countries with a higher infection rate, Argar repeatedly described the policy leading Robinson to interrupt him saying he was either unable or unwilling to answer the question.

On 6 July 2022, Argar resigned from government in the wake of widespread criticism of Boris Johnson's handling of the Chris Pincher scandal, following a large number of other ministerial resignations.

On 7 September 2022, he was appointed Paymaster General and Minister for the Cabinet Office in Liz Truss's first cabinet. He was sworn in as a member of the Privy Council on 13 September 2022 following his appointment.

On 14 October 2022, following the dismissal of Kwasi Kwarteng as Chancellor of the Exchequer, Argar was appointed as Chief Secretary to the Treasury replacing Chris Philp.

Upon the appointment of Rishi Sunak as Prime Minister, Argar left the Cabinet and was appointed Minister of State for Victims and Sentencing in the Ministry of Justice.

=== In opposition ===
Following the Conservative Party's defeat in the 2024 United Kingdom general election and the subsequent formation of the Starmer ministry, Argar was appointed Shadow Secretary of State for Justice in Rishi Sunak's caretaker Shadow Cabinet.

Argar left the Shadow Cabinet of Kemi Badenoch as Shadow Health Secretary in July 2025 due to ill health.

== Personal life ==
According to his 2015 election leaflets, he owns a house in Syston, and Westminster City Council documents in 2015 showed that also rents a flat in Pimlico.

Argar married Laetitia Glossop on 3 September 2022, at the parish church in Hindon, Wiltshire.

== Notes ==
Parliament of the United Kingdom
Preceded by Stephen Dorrell	Member of Parliament for Charnwood; 2015–2024	Constituency abolished
New constituency	Member of Parliament for Melton and Syston; 2024–present	Incumbent
Preceded by Michael Ellis	Minister for the Cabinet Office; 2022	Succeeded by Chris Philp
Preceded by Michael Ellis	Paymaster General; 2022	Succeeded by Chris Philp
Preceded by Chris Philp	Chief Secretary to the Treasury; 2022	Succeeded by John Glen
Preceded by Rachel Maclean	Minister of State for Victims and Sentencing; 2022–2023	Succeeded by Laura Farris (Victims); Gareth Bacon (Sentencing)
Preceded by Damian Hinds	Minister of State for Prisons, Parole and Probation; 2023–2024	Succeeded by The Lord Timpson
Preceded by Shabana Mahmood	Shadow Secretary of State for Justice; 2024	Succeeded by Robert Jenrick
Preceded by Shabana Mahmood	Shadow Lord Chancellor; 2024	Succeeded by Robert Jenrick
