= Charnwood (constituency) =

UK Parliament constituency (1997–2024)

Coordinates: 52.7°N 1.2°W

- Former county constituency for the House of Commons
- Boundary of Charnwood in Leicestershire for the 2019 general election

- Location of Leicestershire within England
- County: Leicestershire
- Population: 94,748 (2011 census)
- Electorate: 75,454 (December 2010)
- Major settlements: Anstey, Birstall, East Goscote, Queniborough, Rothley, Syston, Thurmaston, Woodhouse Eaves, Glenfield, Kirby Muxloe, Leicester Forest East, Groby

1997–2024
- Seats: One
- Created from: Loughborough, Rutland and Melton, Blaby, Bosworth
- Replaced by: Mid Leicestershire, Melton and Syston

Charnwood was a constituency (Note: A county constituency (for the purposes of election expenses and type of returning officer)) of the House of Commons in the UK Parliament from 1997 to 2024.

Further to the completion of the 2023 Periodic Review of Westminster constituencies, the seat was abolished for the 2024 general election, with the majority of the electorate being included in the new constituency of Mid Leicestershire. Syston, East Goscote and Thurmaston were included in the newly created constituency of Melton and Syston.

== Constituency profile ==
The seat emerged from the Boundary Commission report of 1995 reflecting population increases in Leicestershire for the 1997 general election; the largest part of it was previously in Loughborough. During its existence, Charnwood was a Conservative Party stronghold. It mostly comprised affluent commuter villages to the north of Leicester and south of Loughborough; its residents were slightly wealthier than the UK average.

Map of boundaries 2010–2024

== Boundaries ==
1997–2010: The Borough of Charnwood wards of Birstall Goscote, Birstall Greengate, Birstall Netherhall, Birstall Riverside, Birstall Stonehill, Bradgate, East Goscote, Mountsorrel and Rothley, Queniborough, Six Hills, Syston, Thurcaston, Thurmaston, Woodhouse and Swithland, the District of Blaby wards of Ellis, Fairestone, Kirby, Leicester Forest East, the Borough of Hinckley and Bosworth wards of Groby and Ratby.

2010–2024: The Borough of Charnwood wards of Anstey, Birstall Wanlip, Birstall Watermead, East Goscote, Forest Bradgate, Mountsorrel, Queniborough, Rothley and Thurcaston, Syston East, Syston West, Thurmaston, Wreake Villages, the District of Blaby wards of Ellis, Fairestone, Forest, Muxloe, the Borough of Hinckley and Bosworth ward of Groby.

The seat was close to Leicester, between the city and Nottingham; it covered slightly more than half of the local government district of Charnwood to the north of Leicester. The town of Loughborough is the largest in the borough, but lies in a separate constituency.

== Members of Parliament ==
Election	Member	Party
1997	Stephen Dorrell	Conservative
2015	Edward Argar	Conservative

== Elections ==
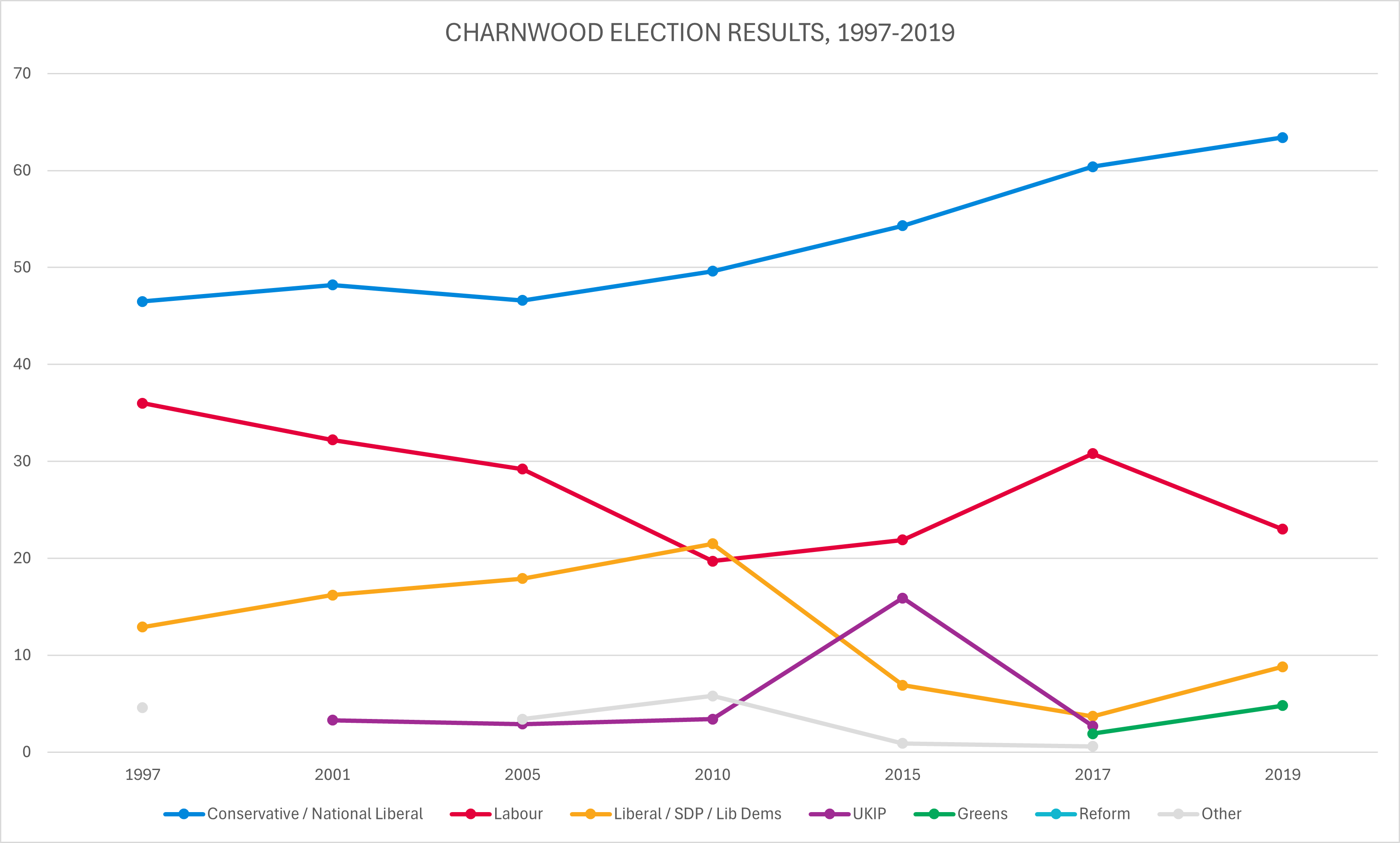
Election results 1997–2019

=== Elections in the 2010s ===
General election 2019: Charnwood
Party	Candidate	Votes	%	±%
Conservative	Edward Argar	35,121	63.4	+3.0
Labour	Gary Godden	12,724	23.0	−7.8
Liberal Democrats	Kate Tipton	4,856	8.8	+5.1
Green	Laurie Needham	2,664	4.8	+2.9
Majority		22,397	40.4	+10.8
Turnout		55,365	69.6	−1.1
Conservative hold		Swing	+5.45	

General election 2017: Charnwood
Party	Candidate	Votes	%	±%
Conservative	Edward Argar	33,318	60.4	+6.1
Labour	Sean Kelly-Walsh	16,977	30.8	+8.9
Liberal Democrats	Simon Sansome	2,052	3.7	−3.2
UKIP	Victoria Connor	1,471	2.7	−13.2
Green	Nick Cox	1,036	1.9	New
BNP	Stephen Denham	322	0.6	−0.3
Majority		16,341	29.6	−2.8
Turnout		55,176	70.7	+3.1
Conservative hold		Swing	+1.4	

General election 2015: Charnwood
Party	Candidate	Votes	%	±%
Conservative	Edward Argar	28,384	54.3	+4.7
Labour	Sean Kelly-Walsh	11,453	21.9	+2.2
UKIP	Lynton Yates	8,330	15.9	+12.5
Liberal Democrats	Simon Sansome	3,605	6.9	−14.6
BNP	Cathy Duffy	489	0.9	−4.9
Majority		16,931	32.4	+4.3
Turnout		52,261	67.6	−4.3
Conservative hold		Swing	+1.25	

General election 2010: Charnwood
Party	Candidate	Votes	%	±%
Conservative	Stephen Dorrell	26,560	49.6	+3.0
Liberal Democrats	Robin Webber-Jones	11,531	21.5	+3.2
Labour	Eric Goodyer	10,536	19.7	−8.9
BNP	Cathy Duffy	3,116	5.8	+2.2
UKIP	Miles Storier	1,799	3.4	+0.4
Majority		15,029	28.1	+10.7
Turnout		53,542	71.9	+5.6
Conservative hold		Swing	-0.1	

=== Elections in the 2000s ===
General election 2005: Charnwood
Party	Candidate	Votes	%	±%
Conservative	Stephen Dorrell	23,571	46.6	−1.6
Labour	Richard Robinson	14,762	29.2	−3.0
Liberal Democrats	Sue King	9,057	17.9	+1.7
BNP	Andrew Holders	1,737	3.4	New
UKIP	Jamie Bye	1,489	2.9	−0.4
Majority		8,809	17.4	+1.4
Turnout		50,616	66.4	+2.0
Conservative hold		Swing	+0.7	

General election 2001: Charnwood
Party	Candidate	Votes	%	±%
Conservative	Stephen Dorrell	23,283	48.2	+1.7
Labour	Sean Sheahan	15,544	32.2	−3.8
Liberal Democrats	Susan King	7,835	16.2	+3.3
UKIP	Jamie Bye	1,603	3.3	New
Majority		7,739	16.0	+6.5
Turnout		48,265	64.4	−12.9
Conservative hold		Swing	+2.8	

=== Elections in the 1990s ===
General election 1997: Charnwood
Party	Candidate	Votes	%	±%
Conservative	Stephen Dorrell	26,110	46.5	
Labour	David Knaggs	20,210	36.0	
Liberal Democrats	Roger Wilson	7,224	12.9	
Referendum	Hugh Meechan	2,104	3.7	
BNP	Matthew Palmer	525	0.9	
Majority		5,900	10.5	
Turnout		56,173	77.3	
Conservative win (new seat)				

== See also ==
- List of parliamentary constituencies in Leicestershire and Rutland
