= Peter Bedford (politician) =

British politician

Peter Bedford MP
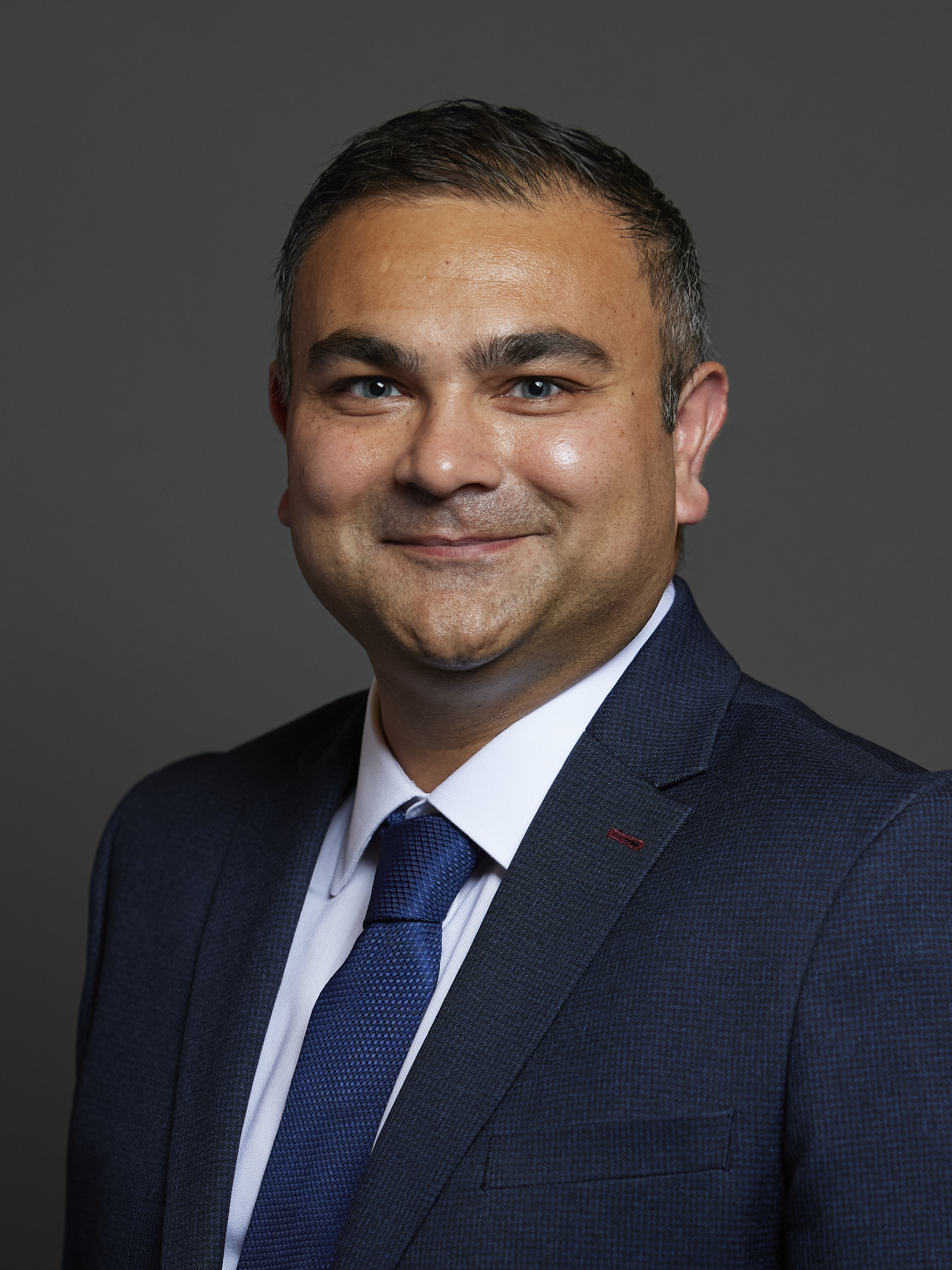
- Official portrait, 2024

Shadow Pension Minister
- Incumbent
- Assumed office 31 August 2026
- Leader: Kemi Badenoch

Member of Parliament for Mid Leicestershire
- Incumbent
- Assumed office 4 July 2024
- Preceded by: Constituency established
- Majority: 2,201 (4.6%)

Personal details
- Born: 3 February 1986 (age 40) Rushden, Northamptonshire, England
- Party: Conservative
- Education: University of Leicester
- Website: www.peterbedford.uk

Peter Alexander Bedford (born 3 February 1986) is a British Conservative Party politician who has been Member of Parliament for Mid Leicestershire since 2024.

== Early life and career ==
Bedford studied law at the University of Leicester. After graduating from university, he qualified as a chartered accountant with PwC.

Bedford contested the Bolsover parliamentary constituency at the 2015 General Election, coming runner up to Dennis Skinner MP.

He was elected to Leicestershire County Council in May 2017 and held several positions including as a Scrutiny Commissioner, Chairman of Corporate Governance, and finally in Cabinet as the portfolio holder for 'Recovery & Transformation'.

== Personal life ==
Bedford was born and raised in Rushden, Northamptonshire, within a single parent family, before relocating to Leicestershire to read law at the University of Leicester.

He claims to have been inspired to get involved in politics after meeting Peter Bone, an ex MP, being advised to "grill him" on many issues as Bone was standing to be a Conservative MP in his hometown of Rushden. Bedford also states he is mixed race, being of Indian and English heritage.

== Electoral history ==
General election 2024: Mid Leicestershire
Party	Candidate	Votes	%	±%
Conservative	Peter Bedford	17,735	36.9	−25.3
Labour	Robert Martin	15,534	32.3	+6.7
Reform	Tom Smith	8,923	18.6	N/A
Green	Tony Deakin	3,414	7.1	+3.0
Liberal Democrats	Ian Bradwell	2,444	5.1	−2.9
Majority		2,201	4.6	
Turnout		48,235	63.5	
Registered electors		75,933		
Conservative win (new seat)				

General election 2015: Bolsover
Party	Candidate	Votes	%	±%
Labour	Dennis Skinner	22,542	51.2	+1.2
Conservative	Peter Bedford	10,764	24.5	−0.1
UKIP	Ray Calladine	9,228	21.0	+17.1
Liberal Democrats	David Lomax	1,464	3.3	−12.2
Majority		11,778	26.7	+1.3
Turnout		43,998	61.1	+0.6
Labour hold		Swing	+0.7	

Parliament of the United Kingdom
New constituency	Member of Parliament for Mid Leicestershire; 2024–present	Incumbent
