= Mid Leicestershire =

UK Parliament constituency (since 2024)

- County constituency for the House of Commons
- Interactive map of boundaries since 2024
- Location within the East Midlands
- County: Leicestershire
- Electorate: 75,924 (2024)
- Major settlements: Anstey, Birstall, Braunstone Town, Rothley, Woodhouse Eaves, Glenfield, Kirby Muxloe, Markfield, Leicester Forest East, Groby

Current constituency
- Created: 2024
- Member of Parliament: Peter Bedford (Conservative)
- Seats: One
- Created from: Charnwood, Bosworth, South Leicestershire

Mid Leicestershire is a constituency first contested at the 2024 United Kingdom general election, since when it has been represented in the House of Commons of the UK Parliament by Peter Bedford, a Conservative. It comprises the majority of the abolished constituency of Charnwood.

== Constituency profile ==
Mid Leicestershire is a constituency in Leicestershire, covering suburban and rural areas on the western and northern edges of the city of Leicester. Settlements in the constituency including Braunstone Town and the villages of Leicester Forest East, Kirby Muxloe, Ratby, Groby, Glenfield, Anstey, Birstall, Rothley, Mountsorrel and Markfield.

The constituency contains part of the ancient Charnwood Forest and the newly-planted National Forest. Quarrying is an important local industry, particularly in the west around Markfield. Most of the constituency's villages have historic origins but were expanded greatly during the 20th century to accommodate middle-class commuters to Leicester. The constituency is generally affluent with low levels of deprivation, and house prices are higher than the rest of the East Midlands.

Residents of Mid Leicestershire are generally older and have average levels of education. They have high rates of income and homeownership, and the child poverty rate is low. A high proportion of residents work in professional occupations, particularly in manufacturing and the public sector, and few claim unemployment benefits. White people made up 82% of the population at the 2021 census. Asians were the largest ethnic minority group at 13%, most of whom were of Indian origin including a large Sikh community. The Asian population were concentrated in Braunstone Town and Birstall where they made up around a quarter of the population.

At the local district council level, most of the constituency is represented by Conservatives with some Liberal Democrat, Labour Party and Green Party councillors elected in Groby, Braunstone Town and Kirby Muxloe, respectively. At the county council, which held elections more recently, Reform UK gained councillors in Braunstone Town and Mountsorrel. An estimated 58% of voters in Mid Leicestershire supported leaving the European Union in the 2016 referendum, higher than the nationwide figure of 52%.

== Boundaries ==
Further to the 2023 review of Westminster constituencies, the composition of the constituency was defined as follows (as they existed on 1 December 2020):

- The District of Blaby wards of: Ellis; Fairestone; Forest; Millfield; Muxloe; Ravenhurst and Fosse; Winstanley.
- The Borough of Charnwood wards of: Anstey; Birstall Wanlip; Birstall Watermead; Forest Bradgate; Mountsorrel; Rothley and Thurcaston.
- The Borough of Hinckley and Bosworth wards of: Groby; Markfield, Stanton and Fieldhead; Ratby, Bagworth and Thornton.

It comprises the majority of the abolished constituency of Charnwood, together with small areas transferred from the Hinckley and Bosworth and South Leicestershire constituencies.

Following local government boundary reviews in Blaby and Charnwood which came into effect in May 2023, the constituency now comprises the following from the 2024 general election:

- The District of Blaby wards of: Braunstone Millfield; Braunstone Ravenhurst; Glenfield Ellis; Glenfield Faire; Kirby Muxloe; Leicester Forest & Lubbesthorpe (most); Thorpe Astley & St Mary's.
- The Borough of Charnwood wards of: Anstey; Birstall East & Wanlip; Birstall West; Forest Bradgate; Mountsorrel; Rothley Brook.
- The Borough of Hinckley and Bosworth wards of: Groby; Markfield, Stanton and Fieldhead; Ratby, Bagworth and Thornton.

== Members of Parliament ==
Charnwood, Hinckley and Bosworth, and South Leicestershire constituencies prior to 2024

Election	Member	Party
2024	Peter Bedford	Conservative

== Elections ==
=== Elections in the 2020s ===
General election 2024: Mid Leicestershire
Party	Candidate	Votes	%	±%
Conservative	Peter Bedford	17,735	36.9	−25.3
Labour	Robert Martin	15,534	32.3	+6.7
Reform	Tom Smith	8,923	18.6	N/A
Green	Tony Deakin	3,414	7.1	+3.0
Liberal Democrats	Ian Bradwell	2,444	5.1	−2.9
Majority		2,201	4.6	−32.0
Turnout		48,050	63.3	−9.2
Registered electors		75,933		
Conservative win (new seat)				
