= List of United Kingdom MPs by seniority (2024–present) =

The Members of Parliament (MPs) who were elected in the 2024 general election and during the 59th Parliament are ranked in the list below by the beginning of their terms in office in the House of Commons.

== Criteria ==
The seniority criteria used in this article are derived from how the Father of the House and Mother of the House are selected. They are not laid down in Standing Orders but arise from the customary practice of the House of Commons. The modern custom is that the Father and Mother of the House are the male and female MPs who have had the longest continuous service. If two or more members were first elected in the same General Election (or at by-elections held on the same day), then priority is given to the one who was sworn in first. The order of swearing in is recorded in the House of Commons Journal, the official record of proceedings.

When a member has had broken service, their seniority (for the purpose of qualifying as the Father/Mother of the House) is based on the latest period of continuous service, not any earlier entry into the House.

The Sinn Féin members, who abstain from taking their seats at Westminster, have never been sworn in. They are ranked (in this list) after all other members who have taken their seats. Between themselves, they are ranked by the first date of the election, for the current period of continuous service. If they are equal on that criterion, then they are ranked in alphabetical order by surname.

== Summary of members elected by party ==
This table relates to the composition of the House of Commons after the 2024 United Kingdom general election. As of 2 November 2026, it summarises the changes in party affiliation that took place during the 2024–present Parliament.

Affiliation	Members		
Affiliation	Elected in 2024	Current	Difference
Labour (Note: The Labour total includes 43 MPs elected in 2024 (43 current MPs as at 19 June 2026) who are sponsored by the Co-operative Party and are designated Labour and Co-operative.)	411 (Note: Some media outlets, such as BBC News, listed Labour's total as 412, by including the Speaker (who, to demonstrate his neutrality, had resigned his Labour Party membership on taking office).)	404 (Note: Includes one deputy speaker) (Note: The Speaker and three deputy speakers by convention comprise two MPs from the government side and two from the opposition side. They do not vote in House of Commons divisions and exercise only a casting vote.)	▼7
Conservative	121	118 (Note: Includes two deputy speakers)	▼3
Liberal Democrats	72	71	▼1
SNP	9	8	▼1
Reform	5	8	▲3
Sinn Féin (Note: Sinn Féin's seven MPs follow a policy of abstentionism. They do not swear into the House of Commons, and do not take part in its formal processes. As a result, they are not able to sit or vote in the House of Commons.)	7	7	Steady
Green (E&W)	4	5	▲1
DUP	5	4	▼1
Plaid Cymru	4	4	Steady
Ind. Alliance (Note: Independent politicians affiliated to the Independent Alliance group of MPs. Some sources group Independent Alliance MPs with other independent MPs, instead of treating the Independent Alliance as a separate group.)	–	4	▲4
SDLP	2	2	Steady
Your Party	–	2	▲2
Alliance	1	1	Steady
UUP	1	1	Steady
TUV	1	1	Steady
Restore	–	1	▲1
Speaker	1	1	Steady
Independent (Note: Unaffiliated independent politicians)	6	8	▲2
Total MPs	650	650	Steady
Total voting	639	639	Steady
Government majority (Note: Total number of MPs on the government side minus MPs on the opposition side. The government side comprises all Labour MPs. The opposition side comprises all other MPs (except the Speaker).)	173	159	▼14
Working majority (Note: Total number of voting MPs on the government side minus voting MPs on the opposition side)	181	167	▼14

For full details of changes during the 2024–present Parliament, see By-elections and Defections, suspensions and resignations.

== List ==
This table assigns a numerical rank to each of the members elected in the 2024 general election and subsequent by-elections, except for those who were elected but never sworn in, who are displayed at the bottom without a number. Members named in italics and shaded in pink are no longer sitting.

Notes reflect party changes and by-election wins during parliamentary terms; prior service as an MP; officers of the Commons; current party leaders, Cabinet or Shadow Cabinet members and committee chairs; honorary titles for oldest and youngest members and former party leaders and holders of Great Offices of State.

As of 2 November 2026, it has been updated to reflect by-elections, resignations and changes in party affiliation.

Rank	Member	Party	Constituency	Elected	Birth Date	Notes
49th Parliament (elected: 9 June 1983, first met: 15 June 1983, dissolved: 18 May 1987)
001	The Rt Hon Sir Edward Leigh	Conservative	Gainsborough	9 Jun 1983	20 Jul 1950	Father of the House
002	The Rt Hon Jeremy Corbyn	Your Party	Islington North	9 Jun 1983	26 May 1949	Elected as Independent in 2024; joined Independent Alliance 2 September 2024; joined Your Party 10 June 2026. Former Leader of the Labour Party and Leader of the Opposition (2015–2020).
003	The Rt Hon Sir Roger Gale	Conservative	Herne Bay and Sandwich	9 Jun 1983	20 Aug 1943	Oldest MP elected in the 2024 election.
50th Parliament (elected: 11 June 1987, first met: 17 June 1987, dissolved: 16 March 1992)
004	The Rt Hon Diane Abbott	Labour	Hackney North and Stoke Newington	11 Jun 1987	27 Sep 1953	Mother of the House
51st Parliament (elected: 9 April 1992, first met: 27 April 1992, dissolved: 8 April 1997)
005	Sir Geoffrey Clifton-Brown	Conservative	North Cotswolds	9 Apr 1992	23 Mar 1953	Chair of the Public Accounts Select Committee
006	Clive Betts	Labour	Sheffield South East	9 Apr 1992	13 Jan 1950	
007	The Rt Hon Sir Iain Duncan Smith	Conservative	Chingford and Woodford Green	9 Apr 1992	9 Apr 1954	Former Leader of the Conservative Party and Leader of the Opposition (2001–2003).
008	The Hon Sir Bernard Jenkin	Conservative	Harwich and North Essex	9 Apr 1992	9 Apr 1959	Chair of the Select Committee on Statutory Instruments and Joint Committee on Statutory Instruments
009	The Rt Hon Dame Angela Eagle	Labour	Wallasey	9 Apr 1992	17 Feb 1961	Secretary of State for Environment, Food and Rural Affairs
010	The Rt Hon Sir John Whittingdale	Conservative	Maldon	9 Apr 1992	16 Oct 1959	
011	The Rt Hon Sir Stephen Timms	Labour	East Ham	9 Jun 1994	29 Jul 1955	Elected at the 1994 Newham North East by-election.
012	Jon Trickett	Labour	Normanton and Hemsworth	1 Feb 1996	2 Jul 1950	Elected at the 1996 Hemsworth by-election.
52nd Parliament (elected: 1 May 1997, first met: 7 May 1997, dissolved: 14 May 2001)
013	The Rt Hon Sir Julian Lewis	Conservative	New Forest East	1 May 1997	26 Sep 1951	
014	The Rt Hon John McDonnell	Labour	Hayes and Harlington	1 May 1997	8 Sep 1951	
015	Gareth Thomas	Labour Co-op	Harrow West	1 May 1997	15 Jul 1967	
016	The Rt Hon Sir Lindsay Hoyle	Speaker	Chorley	1 May 1997	10 Jun 1957	Speaker of the House of Commons
017	The Rt Hon John Healey	Labour	Rawmarsh and Conisbrough	1 May 1997	13 Feb 1960	Chancellor of the Exchequer
018	Barry Gardiner	Labour	Brent West	1 May 1997	10 Mar 1957	
019	The Rt Hon Sir Desmond Swayne	Conservative	New Forest West	1 May 1997	20 Aug 1956	
020	Fabian Hamilton	Labour	Leeds North East	1 May 1997	12 Apr 1955	
021	The Rt Hon Sir Alan Campbell	Labour	Tynemouth	1 May 1997	8 Jul 1957	Leader of the House of Commons, Lord President of the Council and Chair of the Select Committee on the Modernisation of the House of Commons
022	The Rt Hon Maria Eagle	Labour	Liverpool Garston	1 May 1997	17 Feb 1961	
023	Clive Efford	Labour	Eltham and Chislehurst	1 May 1997	10 Jul 1958	
024	Graham Stringer	Labour	Blackley and Middleton South	1 May 1997	17 Feb 1950	
025	The Rt Hon Sir John Hayes	Conservative	South Holland and The Deepings	1 May 1997	23 Jun 1958	
026	The Rt Hon Yvette Cooper	Labour	Pontefract, Castleford and Knottingley	1 May 1997	20 Mar 1969	Secretary of State for Health and Social Care. Former Foreign Secretary (2025–2026) and Home Secretary (2024–2025).
027	Derek Twigg	Labour	Widnes and Halewood	1 May 1997	9 Jul 1959	
028	Dame Siobhain McDonagh	Labour	Mitcham and Morden	1 May 1997	20 Feb 1960	
029	Sir Christopher Chope	Conservative	Christchurch	1 May 1997	19 May 1947	Previously served 1983–1992.
030	The Rt Hon Hilary Benn	Labour	Leeds South	10 Jun 1999	26 Nov 1953	Elected at the 1999 Leeds Central by-election.
031	The Rt Hon David Lammy	Labour	Tottenham	22 Jun 2000	19 Jul 1972	Former Deputy Prime Minister (2025–2026) and Foreign Secretary (2024–2025). Elected at the 2000 Tottenham by-election.
032	Sir Mark Hendrick	Labour Co-op	Preston	23 Nov 2000	2 Nov 1958	Elected at the 2000 Preston by-election.
53rd Parliament (elected: 7 June 2001, first met: 13 June 2001, dissolved: 11 April 2005)
033	Gregory Campbell	DUP	East Londonderry	7 Jun 2001	15 Feb 1953	
034	Andrew Rosindell	Reform	Romford	7 Jun 2001	17 Mar 1966	Elected as Conservative; defected to Reform 18 January 2026.
035	The Rt Hon Alistair Carmichael	Liberal Democrat	Orkney and Shetland	7 Jun 2001	15 Jul 1965	Chair of the Environment, Food and Rural Affairs Select Committee
036	The Rt Hon Mark Francois	Conservative	Rayleigh and Wickford	7 Jun 2001	14 Aug 1965	
037	The Rt Hon Andrew Murrison	Conservative	South West Wiltshire	7 Jun 2001	24 Apr 1961	
038	The Rt Hon Sir Mark Tami	Labour	Alyn and Deeside	7 Jun 2001	3 Oct 1962	
039	The Rt Hon Sir Chris Bryant	Labour	Rhondda and Ogmore	7 Jun 2001	11 Jan 1962	Secretary of State for Northern Ireland
040	Pete Wishart	SNP	Perth and Kinross-shire	7 Jun 2001	9 Mar 1962	
041	The Rt Hon Sir Andrew Mitchell	Conservative	Sutton Coldfield	7 Jun 2001	23 Mar 1956	Previously served 1987–1997.
042	The Rt Hon Liam Byrne	Labour	Birmingham Hodge Hill and Solihull North	15 Jul 2004	2 Oct 1970	Chair of the Business and Trade Select Committee. Elected at the 2004 Birmingham Hodge Hill by-election.
54th Parliament (elected: 5 May 2005, first met: 11 May 2005, dissolved: 12 April 2010)
043	Tim Farron	Liberal Democrat	Westmorland and Lonsdale	5 May 2005	27 May 1970	Former Leader of the Liberal Democrats (2015–2017).
044	The Rt Hon Sir Jeremy Wright	Conservative	Kenilworth and Southam	5 May 2005	24 Oct 1972	
045	The Rt Hon David Mundell	Conservative	Dumfriesshire, Clydesdale and Tweeddale	5 May 2005	27 May 1962	
046	The Rt Hon Mark Pritchard	Conservative	The Wrekin	5 May 2005	22 Nov 1966	
047	The Rt Hon Sir Jeremy Hunt	Conservative	Godalming and Ash	5 May 2005	1 Nov 1966	Former Chancellor of the Exchequer (2022–2024) and Foreign Secretary (2018–2019).
048	Andrew Gwynne	Independent	Gorton and Denton	5 May 2005	4 Jun 1974	Elected as Labour; whip suspended 8 February 2025. Resigned 23 January 2026, triggering the 2026 Gorton and Denton by-election.
049	The Rt Hon Pat McFadden	Labour	Wolverhampton South East	5 May 2005	26 Mar 1965	Secretary of State for Work and Pensions
050	Dame Meg Hillier	Labour Co-op	Hackney South and Shoreditch	5 May 2005	14 Feb 1969	Chair of the Treasury Select Committee and Liaison Committee
051	The Rt Hon Sammy Wilson	DUP	East Antrim	5 May 2005	4 Apr 1953	
052	Kerry McCarthy	Labour	Bristol East	5 May 2005	26 Mar 1965	
053	Dame Jessica Morden	Labour	Newport East	5 May 2005	29 May 1968	Chair of the Committee of Selection. Chair of the Parliamentary Labour Party.
054	The Rt Hon Dame Diana Johnson	Labour	Kingston upon Hull North and Cottingham	5 May 2005	25 Jul 1966	
055	The Rt Hon Graham Stuart	Conservative	Beverley and Holderness	5 May 2005	12 Mar 1962	
056	The Rt Hon Dame Emily Thornberry	Labour	Islington South and Finsbury	5 May 2005	27 Jul 1960	Chair of the Foreign Affairs Select Committee
057	Sharon Hodgson	Labour	Washington and Gateshead South	5 May 2005	1 Apr 1966	
058	The Rt Hon Sir Geoffrey Cox	Conservative	Torridge and Tavistock	5 May 2005	30 Apr 1960	
059	Andy Slaughter	Labour	Hammersmith and Chiswick	5 May 2005	29 Sep 1960	
060	The Rt Hon Ed Miliband	Labour	Doncaster North	5 May 2005	24 Dec 1969	Foreign Secretary. Former Leader of the Labour Party and Leader of the Opposition (2010–2015).
061	Dame Nia Griffith	Labour	Llanelli	5 May 2005	4 Dec 1956	
062	The Rt Hon Sir David Davis	Conservative	Goole and Pocklington	10 Jul 2008	23 Dec 1948	Elected at the 2008 Haltemprice and Howden by-election. Previously served 1987–2008.
55th Parliament (elected: 6 May 2010, first met: 18 May 2010, dissolved: 30 March 2015)
063	The Rt Hon Valerie Vaz	Labour	Walsall and Bloxwich	6 May 2010	7 Dec 1954	
064	Catherine McKinnell	Labour	Newcastle upon Tyne North	6 May 2010	8 Jun 1976	
065	The Rt Hon Jonathan Reynolds	Labour Co-op	Stalybridge and Hyde	6 May 2010	28 Aug 1980	Secretary of State for Business, Innovation, Science and Trade and President of the Board of Trade
066	Martin Vickers	Conservative	Brigg and Immingham	6 May 2010	13 Sep 1950	
067	The Rt Hon Dame Priti Patel	Conservative	Witham	6 May 2010	29 Mar 1972	Former Home Secretary (2019–2022).
068	The Rt Hon Sir Alec Shelbrooke	Conservative	Wetherby and Easingwold	6 May 2010	10 Jan 1976	
069	The Rt Hon Sir Mel Stride	Conservative	Central Devon	6 May 2010	30 Sep 1961	
070	The Rt Hon Damian Hinds	Conservative	East Hampshire	6 May 2010	27 Nov 1969	Shadow Secretary of State for Health and Social Care
071	Ian Lavery	Labour	Blyth and Ashington	6 May 2010	6 Jan 1963	
072	Grahame Morris	Labour	Easington	6 May 2010	13 Mar 1961	
073	The Rt Hon John Glen	Conservative	Salisbury	6 May 2010	1 Apr 1974	
074	The Rt Hon Jesse Norman	Conservative	Hereford and South Herefordshire	6 May 2010	23 Jun 1962	Shadow Leader of the House of Commons
075	Bob Blackman	Conservative	Harrow East	6 May 2010	26 Apr 1956	Chair of the Backbench Business Committee. Chair of the 1922 Committee.
076	Mary Glindon	Labour	Newcastle upon Tyne East and Wallsend	6 May 2010	13 Jan 1957	
077	Mark Garnier	Conservative	Wyre Forest	6 May 2010	26 Feb 1963	
078	The Rt Hon Caroline Nokes	Conservative	Romsey and Southampton North	6 May 2010	26 Jun 1972	Second Deputy Chairman of Ways and Means (Deputy Speaker of the House of Commons)
079	The Rt Hon Dame Caroline Dinenage	Conservative	Gosport	6 May 2010	28 Oct 1971	Chair of the Culture, Media and Sport Committee
080	Toby Perkins	Labour	Chesterfield	6 May 2010	12 Aug 1970	Chair of the Environmental Audit Select Committee
081	Bill Esterson	Labour	Sefton Central	6 May 2010	27 Oct 1966	Chair of the Energy Security and Net Zero Select Committee
082	Yasmin Qureshi	Labour	Bolton South and Walkden	6 May 2010	5 Jul 1963	
083	The Rt Hon Rachel Reeves	Labour	Leeds West and Pudsey	6 May 2010	13 Feb 1979	Former Chancellor of the Exchequer (2024–2026)
084	The Rt Hon Sir Julian Smith	Conservative	Skipton and Ripon	6 May 2010	30 Aug 1971	
085	Lilian Greenwood	Labour	Nottingham South	6 May 2010	26 Mar 1966	
086	Chris Evans	Labour Co-op	Caerphilly	6 May 2010	17 Jul 1977	
087	George Freeman	Conservative	Mid Norfolk	6 May 2010	12 Jul 1967	
088	Bridget Phillipson	Labour	Houghton and Sunderland South	6 May 2010	19 Dec 1983	Minister for Women and Equalities and Chair of the Labour Party
089	Nick Smith	Labour	Blaenau Gwent and Rhymney	6 May 2010	14 Jan 1960	Chair of the Administration Committee
090	Karl Turner	Labour	Kingston upon Hull East	6 May 2010	15 Apr 1971	
091	Dame Chi Onwurah	Labour	Newcastle upon Tyne Central and West	6 May 2010	12 Apr 1965	Chair of the Science, Innovation and Technology Select Committee
092	The Rt Hon Liz Kendall	Labour	Leicester West	6 May 2010	11 Jun 1971	
093	Helen Grant	Conservative	Maidstone and Malling	6 May 2010	28 Sep 1961	
094	Dame Harriett Baldwin	Conservative	West Worcestershire	6 May 2010	2 May 1960	
095	The Rt Hon Steve Barclay	Conservative	North East Cambridgeshire	6 May 2010	3 May 1972	Chair of the Finance Committee
096	The Rt Hon Sir Gavin Williamson	Conservative	Stone, Great Wyrley and Penkridge	6 May 2010	25 Jun 1976	
097	The Rt Hon Lisa Nandy	Labour	Wigan	6 May 2010	9 Aug 1979	Secretary of State for Digital, Culture, Media and Sport
098	The Rt Hon Stuart Andrew	Conservative	Daventry	6 May 2010	25 Nov 1971	
099	The Rt Hon Ian Murray	Labour	Edinburgh South	6 May 2010	10 Aug 1976	
100	Dame Rebecca Harris	Conservative	Castle Point	6 May 2010	22 Dec 1967	Opposition Chief Whip in the House of Commons
101	Rushanara Ali	Labour	Bethnal Green and Stepney	6 May 2010	14 Mar 1975	
102	The Rt Hon Shabana Mahmood	Labour	Birmingham Ladywood	6 May 2010	17 Sep 1980	Home Secretary
103	Jim Shannon	DUP	Strangford	6 May 2010	25 Mar 1955	
104	The Rt Hon Dame Karen Bradley	Conservative	Staffordshire Moorlands	6 May 2010	12 Mar 1970	Chair of the Home Affairs Select Committee
105	Stella Creasy	Labour Co-op	Walthamstow	6 May 2010	5 Apr 1977	
106	Alison McGovern	Labour	Birkenhead	6 May 2010	30 Dec 1980	
107	Debbie Abrahams	Labour	Oldham East and Saddleworth	13 Jan 2011	15 Sep 1960	Chair of the Work and Pensions Select Committee. Elected at the 2011 Oldham East and Saddleworth by-election.
108	The Rt Hon Dan Jarvis	Labour	Barnsley North	3 Mar 2011	30 Nov 1972	Elected at the 2011 Barnsley Central by-election.
109	Seema Malhotra	Labour Co-op	Feltham and Heston	15 Dec 2011	7 Aug 1972	Elected at the 2011 Feltham and Heston by-election.
110	Stephen Doughty	Labour Co-op	Cardiff South and Penarth	15 Nov 2012	15 Apr 1980	Elected at the 2012 Cardiff South and Penarth by-election.
111	The Rt Hon Lucy Powell	Labour Co-op	Manchester Central	15 Nov 2012	10 Oct 1974	Secretary of State for Education and Deputy Leader of the Labour Party. Elected at the 2012 Manchester Central by-election.
112	Sarah Champion	Labour	Rotherham	29 Nov 2012	10 Jul 1969	Chair of the International Development Select Committee. Elected at the 2012 Rotherham by-election.
113	Andy McDonald	Labour	Middlesbrough and Thornaby East	29 Nov 2012	8 Mar 1958	Elected at the 2012 Middlesbrough by-election.
114	The Rt Hon Steve Reed	Labour Co-op	Streatham and Croydon North	29 Nov 2012	12 Nov 1963	Elected at the 2012 Croydon North by-election.
115	Emma Lewell-Buck	Labour	South Shields	2 May 2013	8 Nov 1978	Elected at the 2013 South Shields by-election.
116	Mike Kane	Labour	Wythenshawe and Sale East	13 Feb 2014	9 Jan 1969	Elected at the 2014 Wythenshawe and Sale East by-election.
117	The Rt Hon Robert Jenrick	Reform	Newark	5 Jun 2014	9 Jan 1982	Elected at the 2014 Newark by-election. Elected as Conservative; joined Reform 15 January 2026.
56th Parliament (elected: 7 May 2015, first met: 18 May 2015, dissolved: 3 May 2017)
118	Simon Hoare	Conservative	North Dorset	7 May 2015	28 Jun 1969	Chair of the Public Administration and Constitutional Affairs Select Committee
119	Kevin Hollinrake	Conservative	Thirsk and Malton	7 May 2015	28 Sep 1963	Chairman of the Conservative Party and the Conservative Party Board
120	Alan Mak	Conservative	Havant	7 May 2015	19 Nov 1983	
121	The Rt Hon Tom Tugendhat	Conservative	Tonbridge	7 May 2015	27 Jun 1973	Shadow Foreign Secretary
122	The Rt Hon Chris Philp	Conservative	Croydon South	7 May 2015	6 Jul 1976	Shadow Home Secretary
123	Judith Cummins	Labour	Bradford South	7 May 2015	26 Jun 1967	First Deputy Chairman of Ways and Means (Deputy Speaker of the House of Commons)
124	The Rt Hon Liz Saville Roberts	Plaid Cymru	Dwyfor Meirionnydd	7 May 2015	16 Dec 1964	Plaid Cymru Westminster Group Leader
125	Peter Dowd	Labour	Bootle	7 May 2015	20 Jun 1957	
126	Nus Ghani	Conservative	Sussex Weald	7 May 2015	1 Sep 1972	Chairman of Ways and Means (Deputy Speaker of the House of Commons)
127	Mims Davies	Conservative	East Grinstead and Uckfield	7 May 2015	2 Jun 1975	Shadow Secretary of State for Wales
128	The Rt Hon Angela Rayner	Labour	Ashton-under-Lyne	7 May 2015	28 Mar 1980	Secretary of State for Housing, Communities and Local Government. Former Deputy Prime Minister (2024–2025) and Deputy Leader of the Labour Party (2020–2025).
129	The Rt Hon Matthew Pennycook	Labour	Greenwich and Woolwich	7 May 2015	29 Oct 1982	Minister of State for Housing and Planning
130	Rupa Huq	Labour	Ealing Central and Acton	7 May 2015	2 Apr 1972	
131	Alberto Costa	Conservative	South Leicestershire	7 May 2015	13 Nov 1971	Chair of the Committee on Standards and Committee of Privileges
132	The Rt Hon Suella Braverman	Reform	Fareham and Waterlooville	7 May 2015	3 Apr 1980	Elected as Conservative; defected to Reform 26 January 2026. Former Home Secretary (2022–2023 and 2022).
133	The Rt Hon Edward Argar	Conservative	Melton and Syston	7 May 2015	9 Dec 1977	
134	Nigel Huddleston	Conservative	Droitwich and Evesham	7 May 2015	13 Oct 1970	
135	Mike Wood	Conservative	Kingswinford and South Staffordshire	7 May 2015	17 Mar 1976	
136	Dawn Butler	Labour	Brent East	7 May 2015	3 Nov 1969	Previously served 2005–2010.
137	Catherine West	Labour	Hornsey and Friern Barnet	7 May 2015	14 Sep 1966	
138	The Hon Kate Osamor	Labour Co-op	Edmonton and Winchmore Hill	7 May 2015	15 Aug 1968	
139	Naz Shah	Labour	Bradford West	7 May 2015	13 Nov 1973	
140	The Rt Hon Nick Thomas-Symonds	Labour	Torfaen	7 May 2015	26 May 1980	
141	Helen Hayes	Labour	Dulwich and West Norwood	7 May 2015	8 Aug 1974	Chair of the Education Select Committee
142	Vicky Foxcroft	Labour	Lewisham North	7 May 2015	9 Mar 1977	
143	Brendan O'Hara	SNP	Argyll, Bute and South Lochaber	7 May 2015	27 Apr 1963	
144	Marie Rimmer	Labour	St Helens South and Whiston	7 May 2015	27 Apr 1947	
145	Kirsty Blackman	SNP	Aberdeen North	7 May 2015	20 Mar 1986	
146	Jess Phillips	Labour	Birmingham Yardley	7 May 2015	9 Oct 1981	
147	Justin Madders	Labour	Ellesmere Port and Bromborough	7 May 2015	22 Nov 1972	
148	Chris Law	SNP	Dundee Central	7 May 2015	21 Oct 1969	
149	Cat Smith	Labour	Lancaster and Wyre	7 May 2015	16 Jun 1985	Chair of the Procedure Committee
150	Rebecca Long-Bailey	Labour	Salford	7 May 2015	22 Sep 1979	
151	Richard Burgon	Labour	Leeds East	7 May 2015	19 Sep 1980	
152	Imran Hussain	Labour	Bradford East	7 May 2015	7 Jun 1978	
153	Daniel Zeichner	Labour	Cambridge	7 May 2015	9 Nov 1956	
154	Rachael Maskell	Labour Co-op	York Central	7 May 2015	5 Jul 1972	
155	The Rt Hon Louise Haigh	Labour	Sheffield Heeley	7 May 2015	22 Jul 1987	First Secretary of State, Chancellor of the Duchy of Lancaster and Minister for the Cabinet Office
156	Jo Stevens	Labour	Cardiff East	7 May 2015	6 Sep 1966	
157	The Rt Hon Victoria Atkins	Conservative	Louth and Horncastle	7 May 2015	22 Mar 1976	Shadow Secretary of State for Environment, Food and Rural Affairs
158	Karin Smyth	Labour	Bristol South	7 May 2015	8 Sep 1964	
159	Clive Lewis	Labour	Norwich South	7 May 2015	11 Sep 1971	
160	The Rt Hon Wendy Morton	Conservative	Aldridge-Brownhills	7 May 2015	9 Nov 1967	
161	Gerald Jones	Labour	Merthyr Tydfil and Aberdare	7 May 2015	21 Aug 1970	
162	The Rt Hon Kit Malthouse	Conservative	North West Hampshire	7 May 2015	27 Oct 1966	
163	James Cartlidge	Conservative	South Suffolk	7 May 2015	30 Apr 1974	Shadow Secretary of State for Defence
164	The Rt Hon Sir Oliver Dowden	Conservative	Hertsmere	7 May 2015	1 Aug 1978	Former Deputy Prime Minister (2023–2024).
165	Helen Whately	Conservative	Faversham and Mid Kent	7 May 2015	23 Jun 1976	Shadow Secretary of State for Work and Pensions
166	Tulip Siddiq	Labour	Hampstead and Highgate	7 May 2015	16 Sep 1982	
167	Jeff Smith	Labour	Manchester Withington	7 May 2015	26 Jan 1963	
168	The Rt Hon Sir Keir Starmer	Labour	Holborn and St Pancras	7 May 2015	2 Sep 1962	Former Prime Minister (2024–2026), Leader of the Labour Party (2020–2026) and Leader of the Opposition (2020–2024). Resigned on 1 September 2026, triggering the 2026 Holborn and St Pancras by-election.
169	The Rt Hon Sir James Cleverly	Conservative	Braintree	7 May 2015	4 Sep 1969	Former Home Secretary (2023–2024) and Foreign Secretary (2022–2023).
170	Ruth Cadbury	Labour	Brentford and Isleworth	7 May 2015	14 May 1959	Chair of the Transport Select Committee
171	Carolyn Harris	Labour	Neath and Swansea East	7 May 2015	18 Sep 1960	
172	The Rt Hon Wes Streeting	Labour	Ilford North	7 May 2015	21 Jan 1983	Secretary of State for Defence
173	The Rt Hon Peter Kyle	Labour	Hove and Portslade	7 May 2015	9 Sep 1970	
174	The Rt Hon Rishi Sunak	Conservative	Richmond and Northallerton	7 May 2015	12 May 1980	Former Prime Minister and Leader of the Conservative Party (2022–2024), Leader of the Opposition (2024) and Chancellor of the Exchequer (2020–2022).
175	The Rt Hon Stephen Kinnock	Labour	Aberafan Maesteg	7 May 2015	1 Jan 1970	Secretary of State for Wales
176	Neil Coyle	Labour	Bermondsey and Old Southwark	7 May 2015	30 Dec 1978	
177	The Rt Hon Gavin Robinson	DUP	Belfast East	7 May 2015	22 Nov 1984	Leader of the DUP
178	Jim McMahon	Labour Co-op	Oldham West, Chadderton and Royton	3 Dec 2015	7 Jul 1980	Chair of the Co-operative Party. Elected at the 2015 Oldham West and Royton by-election.
179	Gill Furniss	Labour	Sheffield Brightside and Hillsborough	5 May 2016	14 Mar 1957	Elected at the 2016 Sheffield Brightside and Hillsborough by-election.
180	Christopher Elmore	Labour	Bridgend	5 May 2016	23 Dec 1983	Elected at the 2016 Ogmore by-election.
181	Rosena Allin-Khan	Labour	Tooting	16 Jun 2016	1 Jan 1977	Elected at the 2016 Tooting by-election.
182	Caroline Johnson	Conservative	Sleaford and North Hykeham	8 Dec 2016	31 Dec 1977	Elected at the 2016 Sleaford and North Hykeham by-election.
57th Parliament (elected: 8 June 2017, first met: 13 June 2017, dissolved: 6 November 2019)
183	The Rt Hon Sir Ed Davey	Liberal Democrat	Kingston and Surbiton	8 Jun 2017	25 Dec 1965	Leader of the Liberal Democrats. Previously served 1997–2015.
184	The Rt Hon Esther McVey	Conservative	Tatton	8 Jun 2017	24 Oct 1967	Previously served 2010–2015.
185	Tan Dhesi	Labour	Slough	8 Jun 2017	17 Aug 1978	Chair of the Defence Select Committee
186	Afzal Khan	Labour	Manchester Rusholme	8 Jun 2017	5 Apr 1958	
187	Luke Pollard	Labour Co-op	Plymouth Sutton and Devonport	8 Jun 2017	10 Apr 1980	
188	The Rt Hon Alex Norris	Labour Co-op	Nottingham North and Kimberley	8 Jun 2017	4 Feb 1984	Lord Chancellor and Secretary of State for Justice
189	Andrew Bowie	Conservative	West Aberdeenshire and Kincardine	8 Jun 2017	28 May 1987	Shadow Secretary of State for Energy Security
190	Marsha de Cordova	Labour	Battersea	8 Jun 2017	23 Jan 1976	
191	Matt Western	Labour	Warwick and Leamington	8 Jun 2017	7 Nov 1962	Chair of the Joint Committee on the National Security Strategy
192	Wera Hobhouse	Liberal Democrat	Bath	8 Jun 2017	8 Feb 1960	
193	Tonia Antoniazzi	Labour	Gower	8 Jun 2017	5 Oct 1971	Chair of the Northern Ireland Affairs Committee
194	Jamie Stone	Liberal Democrat	Caithness, Sutherland and Easter Ross	8 Jun 2017	16 Jun 1954	Chair of the Petitions Committee
195	Mike Amesbury	Independent	Runcorn and Helsby	8 Jun 2017	7 May 1969	Elected as Labour; whip suspended 27 October 2024; resigned 17 March 2025, triggering the 2025 Runcorn and Helsby by-election.
196	Christine Jardine	Liberal Democrat	Edinburgh West	8 Jun 2017	24 Nov 1960	
197	Ben Lake	Plaid Cymru	Ceredigion Preseli	8 Jun 2017	22 Jan 1993	
198	Dame Anneliese Dodds	Labour Co-op	Oxford East	8 Jun 2017	16 Mar 1978	
199	Mohammad Yasin	Labour	Bedford	8 Jun 2017	15 Oct 1971	
200	Alex Sobel	Labour Co-op	Leeds Central and Headingley	8 Jun 2017	26 Apr 1975	Chair of the Joint Committee on Human Rights
201	Emma Hardy	Labour	Kingston upon Hull West and Haltemprice	8 Jun 2017	17 Jul 1979	
202	Darren Jones	Labour	Bristol North West	8 Jun 2017	13 Nov 1986	
203	John Lamont	Conservative	Berwickshire, Roxburgh and Selkirk	8 Jun 2017	15 Apr 1976	
204	Bambos Charalambous	Labour	Southgate and Wood Green	8 Jun 2017	2 Dec 1967	
205	Dan Carden	Labour	Liverpool Walton	8 Jun 2017	28 Oct 1986	
206	The Rt Hon Ellie Reeves	Labour	Lewisham West and East Dulwich	8 Jun 2017	11 Dec 1980	Attorney General for England and Wales and Advocate General for Northern Ireland
207	Stephanie Peacock	Labour	Barnsley South	8 Jun 2017	19 Dec 1986	
208	Liz Twist	Labour	Blaydon and Consett	8 Jun 2017	10 Jul 1956	
209	Neil O'Brien	Conservative	Harborough, Oadby and Wigston	8 Jun 2017	6 Nov 1978	Shadow Minister for Policy Renewal
210	Alex Burghart	Conservative	Brentwood and Ongar	8 Jun 2017	7 Sep 1977	Deputy Leader of the Conservative Party, Deputy Leader of the Opposition, Shadow Chancellor of the Duchy of Lancaster and Shadow Secretary of State for Northern Ireland
211	Julia Lopez	Conservative	Hornchurch and Upminster	8 Jun 2017	4 Jun 1984	Shadow Secretary of State for Business, Innovation, Science and Trade (acting)
212	Stephen Morgan	Labour	Portsmouth South	8 Jun 2017	17 Jan 1981	
213	Anna McMorrin	Labour	Cardiff North	8 Jun 2017	24 Sep 1971	
214	Preet Gill	Labour Co-op	Birmingham Edgbaston	8 Jun 2017	21 Nov 1972	
215	Matt Rodda	Labour	Reading Central	8 Jun 2017	15 Dec 1966	
216	The Rt Hon Kemi Badenoch	Conservative	North West Essex	8 Jun 2017	2 Jan 1980	Leader of the Opposition and Leader of the Conservative Party
217	Layla Moran	Liberal Democrat	Oxford West and Abingdon	8 Jun 2017	12 Sep 1982	Chair of the Health and Social Care Select Committee
218	Sarah Jones	Labour	Croydon West	8 Jun 2017	20 Dec 1972	
219	Rosie Duffield	Independent	Canterbury	8 Jun 2017	1 Jul 1971	Elected as Labour; resigned the Labour whip 28 September 2024.
220	Janet Daby	Labour	Lewisham East	14 June 2018	15 Dec 1970	Elected at the 2018 Lewisham East by-election.
221	Ruth Jones	Labour	Newport West and Islwyn	5 Apr 2019	23 Apr 1962	Chair of the Welsh Affairs Select Committee. Elected at the 2019 Newport West by-election.
58th Parliament (elected: 12 December 2019, first met: 17 December 2019, dissolved: 30 May 2024)
222	Richard Fuller	Conservative	North Bedfordshire	12 Dec 2019	30 May 1962	Shadow Chief Secretary to the Treasury. Previously served 2010–2017.
223	Greg Smith	Conservative	Mid Buckinghamshire	12 Dec 2019	3 Mar 1979	
224	Tahir Ali	Labour	Birmingham Hall Green and Moseley	12 Dec 2019	15 Oct 1971	
225	Kieran Mullan	Conservative	Bexhill and Battle	12 Dec 2019	6 Jun 1984	
226	Gareth Bacon	Conservative	Orpington	12 Dec 2019	7 Apr 1972	
227	Ben Spencer	Conservative	Runnymede and Weybridge	12 Dec 2019	11 Dec 1981	
228	Christian Wakeford	Labour	Bury South	12 Dec 2019	9 Nov 1984	
229	Paul Holmes	Conservative	Hamble Valley	12 Dec 2019	25 Aug 1988	
230	Feryal Clark	Labour	Enfield North	12 Dec 2019	6 Jan 1979	
231	The Rt Hon Richard Holden	Conservative	Basildon and Billericay	12 Dec 2019	11 Mar 1985	Shadow Secretary of State for Transport and Shadow Paymaster General
232	Danny Kruger	Reform	East Wiltshire	12 Dec 2019	23 Oct 1974	Elected as Conservative; defected to Reform 15 September 2025.
233	Lee Anderson	Reform	Ashfield	12 Dec 2019	6 Jan 1967	Chair of Reform UK
234	Sarah Olney	Liberal Democrat	Richmond Park	12 Dec 2019	11 Jan 1977	Previously served 2016–2017.
235	Daisy Cooper	Liberal Democrat	St Albans	12 Dec 2019	29 Oct 1981	
236	Wendy Chamberlain	Liberal Democrat	North East Fife	12 Dec 2019	20 Dec 1976	
237	Claire Hanna	SDLP	Belfast South and Mid Down	12 Dec 2019	19 Jun 1980	Leader of the SDLP
238	Alicia Kearns	Conservative	Rutland and Stamford	12 Dec 2019	11 Nov 1987	
239	Joy Morrissey	Conservative	Beaconsfield	12 Dec 2019	30 Jan 1981	Shadow Secretary of State for Women and Equalities
240	Luke Evans	Conservative	Hinckley and Bosworth	12 Dec 2019	10 Jan 1983	
241	Zarah Sultana	Your Party	Coventry South	12 Dec 2019	31 Oct 1993	Elected as Labour; whip suspended 23 July 2024; joined Independent Alliance 24 July 2025; left Independent Alliance 18 September 2025; joined Your Party 18 November 2025.
242	Apsana Begum	Labour	Poplar and Limehouse	12 Dec 2019	25 May 1990	
243	The Hon Jerome Mayhew	Conservative	Broadland and Fakenham	12 Dec 2019	11 Apr 1970	
244	James Wild	Conservative	North West Norfolk	12 Dec 2019	5 Jan 1977	
245	Gareth Davies	Conservative	Grantham and Bourne	12 Dec 2019	31 Mar 1984	
246	Stuart Anderson	Conservative	South Shropshire	12 Dec 2019	17 Jul 1976	
247	Munira Wilson	Liberal Democrat	Twickenham	12 Dec 2019	26 Apr 1978	
248	The Rt Hon Claire Coutinho	Conservative	East Surrey	12 Dec 2019	8 Jul 1985	Shadow Secretary of State for Business, Innovation, Science and Trade (on leave)
249	David Simmonds	Conservative	Ruislip, Northwood and Pinner	12 Dec 2019	Feb 1976	
250	Matt Vickers	Conservative	Stockton West	12 Dec 2019	24 Sep 1983	
251	Robbie Moore	Conservative	Keighley and Ilkley	12 Dec 2019	28 Nov 1984	
252	Abena Oppong-Asare	Labour	Erith and Thamesmead	12 Dec 2019	8 Feb 1983	Chair of the Housing, Communities and Local Government Committee
253	The Rt Hon James Murray	Labour Co-op	Ealing North	12 Dec 2019	13 Jul 1983	
254	Saqib Bhatti	Conservative	Meriden and Solihull East	12 Dec 2019	18 Jun 1985	
255	Bell Ribeiro-Addy	Labour	Clapham and Brixton Hill	12 Dec 2019	1 Mar 1985	
256	Mary Foy	Labour	City of Durham	12 Dec 2019	27 Feb 1968	
257	Paula Barker	Labour	Liverpool Wavertree	12 Dec 2019	9 May 1972	
258	Kim Johnson	Labour	Liverpool Riverside	12 Dec 2019	25 Aug 1966	
259	Navendu Mishra	Labour	Stockport	12 Dec 2019	22 Aug 1989	
260	Carla Lockhart	Ind. Unionist	Upper Bann	12 Dec 2019	28 Feb 1985	Elected as DUP; resigned whip on 2 November 2026.
261	Ian Byrne	Labour	Liverpool West Derby	12 Dec 2019	10 May 1972	
262	Dave Doogan	SNP	Angus and Perthshire Glens	12 Dec 2019	4 Mar 1973	SNP Westminster Group Leader
263	Alex Davies-Jones	Labour	Pontypridd	12 Dec 2019	5 Apr 1989	
264	Rachel Hopkins	Labour	Luton South and South Bedfordshire	12 Dec 2019	30 Mar 1972	
265	Kate Osborne	Labour	Jarrow and Gateshead East	12 Dec 2019		
266	Gagan Mohindra	Conservative	South West Hertfordshire	12 Dec 2019	7 Apr 1978	
267	Nadia Whittome	Labour	Nottingham East	12 Dec 2019	29 Aug 1996	
268	Taiwo Owatemi	Labour	Coventry North West	12 Dec 2019	22 Jul 1992	
269	Fleur Anderson	Labour	Putney	12 Dec 2019	6 Feb 1971	
270	Florence Eshalomi	Labour Co-op	Vauxhall and Camberwell Green	12 Dec 2019	18 Sep 1980	
271	Sarah Owen	Labour	Luton North	12 Dec 2019	11 Jan 1983	
272	Andrew Griffith	Conservative	Arundel and South Downs	12 Dec 2019	23 Feb 1971	Shadow Chancellor of the Exchequer
273	The Hon Olivia Blake	Labour	Sheffield Hallam	12 Dec 2019	10 Mar 1990	
274	Charlotte Nichols	Labour	Warrington North	12 Dec 2019	5 Apr 1991	
275	The Rt Hon Laura Trott	Conservative	Sevenoaks	12 Dec 2019	7 Dec 1984	Shadow Secretary of State for Education
276	Neil Hudson	Conservative	Epping Forest	12 Dec 2019	1969	
277	Colum Eastwood	SDLP	Foyle	12 Dec 2019	30 Apr 1983	Former Leader of the SDLP (2015–2024).
278	The Rt Hon Stephen Flynn	SNP	Aberdeen South	12 Dec 2019	13 Oct 1988	SNP Westminster Group Leader. Resigned 14 May 2026, triggering the 2026 Aberdeen South by-election.
279	Sarah Green	Liberal Democrat	Chesham and Amersham	17 Jun 2021	25 Apr 1982	Elected at the 2021 Chesham and Amersham by-election.
280	Kim Leadbeater	Labour	Spen Valley	1 Jul 2021	1 May 1976	Elected at the 2021 Batley and Spen by-election.
281	Louie French	Conservative	Old Bexley and Sidcup	2 Dec 2021	14 Feb 1988	Elected at the 2021 Old Bexley and Sidcup by-election.
282	Helen Morgan	Liberal Democrat	North Shropshire	16 Dec 2021	9 Apr 1975	Elected at the 2021 North Shropshire by-election.
283	Paulette Hamilton	Labour	Birmingham Erdington	3 Mar 2022	1962/63	Elected at the 2022 Birmingham Erdington by-election.
284	Simon Lightwood	Labour Co-op	Wakefield and Rothwell	24 June 2022	15 Dec 1980	Elected at the 2022 Wakefield by-election.
285	Richard Foord	Liberal Democrat	Honiton and Sidmouth	24 June 2022	13 Feb 1978	Elected at the 2022 Tiverton and Honiton by-election.
286	Samantha Dixon	Labour	Chester North and Neston	1 Dec 2022	23 Sep 1965	Elected at the 2022 City of Chester by-election.
287	Andrew Western	Labour	Stretford and Urmston	15 Dec 2022	18 Mar 1985	Elected at the 2022 Stretford and Urmston by-election.
288	Ashley Dalton	Labour	West Lancashire	9 Feb 2023	15 Aug 1972	Elected at the 2023 West Lancashire by-election.
289	Keir Mather	Labour	Selby	20 July 2023	29 Jan 1998	Elected at the 2023 Selby and Ainsty by-election.
290	Sarah Dyke	Liberal Democrat	Glastonbury and Somerton	20 July 2023	1971	Elected at the 2023 Somerton and Frome by-election.
291	Michael Shanks	Labour	Rutherglen	5 Oct 2023	4 Mar 1988	Elected at the 2023 Rutherglen and Hamilton West by-election.
292	Sarah Edwards	Labour	Tamworth	19 Oct 2023	17 Jun 1988	Elected at the 2023 Tamworth by-election.
293	Alistair Strathern	Labour	Hitchin	19 Oct 2023	5 Mar 1990	Elected at the 2023 Mid Bedfordshire by-election.
294	Gen Kitchen	Labour	Wellingborough and Rushden	15 Feb 2024	5 May 1995	Elected at the 2024 Wellingborough by-election.
295	Damien Egan	Labour	Bristol North East	15 Feb 2024	8 Jul 1983	Elected at the 2024 Kingswood by-election.
296	Chris Webb	Labour	Blackpool South	2 May 2024	26 Apr 1986	Elected at the 2024 Blackpool South by-election.
59th Parliament (elected: 4 July 2024, first met: 9 July 2024)
297	The Rt Hon Douglas Alexander	Labour Co-op	Lothian East	4 Jul 2024	26 Oct 1967	Secretary of State for Scotland. Previously served 1997–2015.
298	The Rt Hon Heidi Alexander	Labour	Swindon South	4 Jul 2024	17 Apr 1975	Secretary of State for Transport. Previously served 2010–2018.
299	The Rt Hon Emma Reynolds	Labour	Wycombe	4 Jul 2024	2 Nov 1977	Chief Secretary to the Treasury. Previously served 2010–2019.
300	Sorcha Eastwood	Alliance	Lagan Valley	4 Jul 2024	Oct 1985	
301	Andrew George	Liberal Democrat	St Ives	4 Jul 2024	2 Dec 1958	Previously served 1997–2015.
302	Juliet Campbell	Labour	Broxtowe	4 Jul 2024		
303	Adam Jogee	Labour	Newcastle-under-Lyme	4 Jul 2024	Dec 1991	
304	Bradley Thomas	Conservative	Bromsgrove	4 Jul 2024		
305	Matthew Patrick	Labour	Wirral West	4 Jul 2024	1987/88	
306	Lewis Cocking	Conservative	Broxbourne	4 Jul 2024	1992	
307	Leigh Ingham	Labour	Stafford	4 Jul 2024	1984	
308	Maya Ellis	Labour	Ribble Valley	4 Jul 2024	1987/88	
309	Chris McDonald	Labour	Stockton North	4 Jul 2024	1976/77	
310	Lauren Sullivan	Labour	Gravesham	4 Jul 2024		
311	Dan Norris	Independent	North East Somerset and Hanham	4 Jul 2024	28 Jan 1960	Elected as Labour; whip suspended 4 April 2025. Previously served 1997–2010.
312	Alex Mayer	Labour	Dunstable and Leighton Buzzard	4 Jul 2024	2 Jun 1981	
313	Sir Ashley Fox	Conservative	Bridgwater	4 Jul 2024	15 Nov 1969	
314	Josh Babarinde	Liberal Democrat	Eastbourne	4 Jul 2024	20 Jun 1993	President of the Liberal Democrats and Chair of the Federal Board
315	Brian Mathew	Liberal Democrat	Melksham and Devizes	4 Jul 2024	25 Jul 1960	
316	Jim Allister	TUV	North Antrim	4 Jul 2024	2 Apr 1953	Leader of the TUV
317	Alex Easton	Independent	North Down	4 Jul 2024	19 May 1969	Elected as Independent.
318	Ben Maguire	Liberal Democrat	North Cornwall	4 Jul 2024	10 Aug 1991	
319	Adam Dance	Liberal Democrat	Yeovil	4 Jul 2024	13 Jun 1992	
320	Martin Wrigley	Liberal Democrat	Newton Abbot	4 Jul 2024	Apr 1962	
321	Vikki Slade	Liberal Democrat	Mid Dorset and North Poole	4 Jul 2024	17 Dec 1972	
322	Gideon Amos	Liberal Democrat	Taunton and Wellington	4 Jul 2024	16 Jan 1965	
323	Tessa Munt	Liberal Democrat	Wells and Mendip Hills	4 Jul 2024	16 Oct 1959	Previously served 2010–2015.
324	Susan Murray	Liberal Democrat	Mid Dunbartonshire	4 Jul 2024	26 May 1957	
325	Clive Jones	Liberal Democrat	Wokingham	4 Jul 2024	10 Jul 1958	
326	Lee Dillon	Liberal Democrat	Newbury	4 Jul 2024	1983	
327	Tris Osborne	Labour	Chatham and Aylesford	4 Jul 2024		
328	Jo White	Labour	Bassetlaw	4 Jul 2024	22 Jan 1964	
329	Andrew Snowden	Conservative	Fylde	4 Jul 2024	18 Oct 1984	
330	Tom Gordon	Liberal Democrat	Harrogate and Knaresborough	4 Jul 2024	26 Feb 1994	
331	Ben Obese-Jecty	Conservative	Huntingdon	4 Jul 2024	Sep 1979	
332	Rebecca Paul	Conservative	Reigate	4 Jul 2024	1979	Shadow Secretary of State for Digital, Culture, Media and Sport
333	Jack Rankin	Conservative	Windsor	4 Jul 2024	19 Aug 1992	
334	Aphra Brandreth	Conservative	Chester South and Eddisbury	4 Jul 2024	18 Jul 1978	
335	Rebecca Smith	Conservative	South West Devon	4 Jul 2024	1981	
336	Alex Barros-Curtis	Labour	Cardiff West	4 Jul 2024	1986	
337	The Rt Hon Kanishka Narayan	Labour	Vale of Glamorgan	4 Jul 2024	1991	Minister for Artificial Intelligence
338	Torsten Bell	Labour	Swansea West	4 Jul 2024	Sep 1982	
339	Gareth Snell	Labour Co-op	Stoke-on-Trent Central	4 Jul 2024	1 Jan 1986	Previously served 2017–2019.
340	Henry Tufnell	Labour	Mid and South Pembrokeshire	4 Jul 2024	19 Jun 1992	
341	Luke Murphy	Labour	Basingstoke	4 Jul 2024		
342	Luke Myer	Labour	Middlesbrough South and East Cleveland	4 Jul 2024	5 May 1995	
343	Steffan Aquarone	Liberal Democrat	North Norfolk	4 Jul 2024	12 May 1984	
344	Peter Bedford	Conservative	Mid Leicestershire	4 Jul 2024	3 Feb 1986	
345	Caroline Voaden	Liberal Democrat	South Devon	4 Jul 2024	22 Nov 1968	
346	Roz Savage	Liberal Democrat	South Cotswolds	4 Jul 2024	23 Dec 1967	
347	Sarah Gibson	Liberal Democrat	Chippenham	4 Jul 2024	Apr 1966	
348	Anna Sabine	Liberal Democrat	Frome and East Somerset	4 Jul 2024		
349	Ian Sollom	Liberal Democrat	St Neots and Mid Cambridgeshire	4 Jul 2024		
350	Emma Foody	Labour Co-op	Cramlington and Killingworth	4 Jul 2024	Aug 1987	
351	Lisa Smart	Liberal Democrat	Hazel Grove	4 Jul 2024		
352	Pamela Nash	Labour	Motherwell, Wishaw and Carluke	4 Jul 2024	24 Jun 1984	Previously served 2010–2015.
353	Joe Robertson	Conservative	Isle of Wight East	4 Jul 2024	1984	
354	Bobby Dean	Liberal Democrat	Carshalton and Wallington	4 Jul 2024	1989/90	
355	Monica Harding	Liberal Democrat	Esher and Walton	4 Jul 2024	21 Jan 1972	
356	Joshua Reynolds	Liberal Democrat	Maidenhead	4 Jul 2024	13 Jan 1999	
357	Sarah Bool	Conservative	South Northamptonshire	4 Jul 2024	1987/88	
358	Manuela Perteghella	Liberal Democrat	Stratford-on-Avon	4 Jul 2024	1973/74	
359	Neil Shastri-Hurst	Conservative	Solihull West and Shirley	4 Jul 2024	1984	
360	Max Wilkinson	Liberal Democrat	Cheltenham	4 Jul 2024	16 Mar 1984	
361	Charlie Dewhirst	Conservative	Bridlington and The Wolds	4 Jul 2024	4 Jun 1980	
362	Ian Roome	Liberal Democrat	North Devon	4 Jul 2024	1968	
363	Oliver Ryan	Labour Co-op	Burnley	4 Jul 2024	22 Apr 1995	
364	Sir Nic Dakin	Labour	Scunthorpe	4 Jul 2024	10 Jul 1955	Previously served 2010–2019.
365	Emily Darlington	Labour	Milton Keynes Central	4 Jul 2024		
366	Dan Tomlinson	Labour	Chipping Barnet	4 Jul 2024	Jul 1992	
367	Luke Akehurst	Labour	North Durham	4 Jul 2024	2 Mar 1972	
368	Calvin Bailey	Labour	Leyton and Wanstead	4 Jul 2024	1977/78	
369	Polly Billington	Labour	East Thanet	4 Jul 2024	1967	
370	Jessica Toale	Labour	Bournemouth West	4 Jul 2024	May 1986	
371	Yuan Yang	Labour	Earley and Woodley	4 Jul 2024	1990	
372	Brian Leishman	Labour	Alloa and Grangemouth	4 Jul 2024	Jul 1982	
373	Adam Thompson	Labour	Erewash	4 Jul 2024	30 Nov 1990	
374	Matt Bishop	Labour	Forest of Dean	4 Jul 2024	1984	
375	Paul Foster	Labour	South Ribble	4 Jul 2024		
376	Ben Goldsborough	Labour	South Norfolk	4 Jul 2024	Aug 1990	
377	Peter Prinsley	Labour	Bury St Edmunds and Stowmarket	4 Jul 2024	8 Apr 1958	
378	Seamus Logan	SNP	Aberdeenshire North and Moray East	4 Jul 2024	4 Jan 1958	
379	Lorraine Beavers	Labour	Blackpool North and Fleetwood	4 Jul 2024	24 Nov 1962	
380	Freddie van Mierlo	Liberal Democrat	Henley and Thame	4 Jul 2024	1989/90	
381	Bayo Alaba	Independent	Southend East and Rochford	4 Jul 2024	1972	Elected as Labour; whip suspended 17 August 2026.
382	Claire Hazelgrove	Labour	Filton and Bradley Stoke	4 Jul 2024	16 Jul 1988	
383	Carla Denyer	Green	Bristol Central	4 Jul 2024	24 Sep 1985	Former Co-Leader of the Green Party (2021–2025)
384	Ellie Chowns	Green	North Herefordshire	4 Jul 2024	7 Mar 1975	Green Party Westminster Group Leader
385	Siân Berry	Green	Brighton Pavilion	4 Jul 2024	9 Jul 1974	Former Co-Leader of the Green Party (2018–2021).
386	Adrian Ramsay	Green	Waveney Valley	4 Jul 2024	Aug 1981	Former Co-Leader of the Green Party (2021–2025).
387	Stephen Gethins	SNP	Arbroath and Broughty Ferry	4 Jul 2024	28 Mar 1976	Previously served 2015–2019. Resigned 14 May 2026, triggering the 2026 Arbroath and Broughty Ferry by-election.
388	Blake Stephenson	Conservative	Mid Bedfordshire	4 Jul 2024		
389	Greg Stafford	Conservative	Farnham and Bordon	4 Jul 2024		
390	Lincoln Jopp	Conservative	Spelthorne	4 Jul 2024	2 Feb 1968	
391	The Hon Patrick Spencer	Conservative	Central Suffolk and North Ipswich	4 Jul 2024	2 May 1988	
392	Melanie Onn	Labour	Great Grimsby and Cleethorpes	4 Jul 2024	19 Jun 1979	Previously served 2015–2019.
393	Richard Baker	Labour	Glenrothes and Mid Fife	4 Jul 2024	29 May 1974	
394	Jack Abbott	Labour Co-op	Ipswich	4 Jul 2024	18 Oct 1990	
395	Michael Payne	Labour	Gedling	4 Jul 2024	4 Jan 1987	
396	Shaun Davies	Labour	Telford	4 Jul 2024	1986	
397	Luke Charters	Labour	York Outer	4 Jul 2024	18 Aug 1995	
398	Mike Reader	Labour	Northampton South	4 Jul 2024		
399	Callum Anderson	Labour	Buckingham and Bletchley	4 Jul 2024	1991	
400	Jonathan Brash	Labour	Hartlepool	4 Jul 2024		
401	Melanie Ward	Labour	Cowdenbeath and Kirkcaldy	4 Jul 2024	May 1981	
402	Laura Kyrke-Smith	Labour	Aylesbury	4 Jul 2024	1 Sep 1983	
403	Sadik Al-Hassan	Labour	North Somerset	4 Jul 2024	17 Dec 1984	
404	Beccy Cooper	Labour	Worthing West	4 Jul 2024		
405	Lizzi Collinge	Labour	Morecambe and Lunesdale	4 Jul 2024		
406	Julie Minns	Labour	Carlisle	4 Jul 2024	11 Dec 1968	
407	Joe Morris	Labour	Hexham	4 Jul 2024		
408	Douglas McAllister	Labour	West Dunbartonshire	4 Jul 2024	1973	
409	Martin Rhodes	Labour	Glasgow North	4 Jul 2024		
410	David Williams	Labour	Stoke-on-Trent North	4 Jul 2024		
411	Allison Gardner	Labour	Stoke-on-Trent South	4 Jul 2024		
412	Catherine Atkinson	Labour	Derby North	4 Jul 2024		Chair of the Justice Select Committee
413	The Rt Hon Lucy Rigby	Labour	Northampton North	4 Jul 2024	1982	
414	Lola McEvoy	Labour	Darlington	4 Jul 2024	29 Sep 1987	
415	Andy MacNae	Labour	Rossendale and Darwen	4 Jul 2024	29 Apr 1965	
416	David Pinto-Duschinsky	Labour	Hendon	4 Jul 2024	Jun 1974	
417	Katie White	Labour	Leeds North West	4 Jul 2024	1980/81	
418	Alex McIntyre	Labour	Gloucester	4 Jul 2024		
419	Johanna Baxter	Labour	Paisley and Renfrewshire South	4 Jul 2024	Mar 1979	
420	Chris Murray	Labour	Edinburgh East and Musselburgh	4 Jul 2024	1987/88	
421	David Taylor	Labour	Hemel Hempstead	4 Jul 2024		
422	David Smith	Labour	North Northumberland	4 Jul 2024		
423	James Naish	Labour	Rushcliffe	4 Jul 2024	20 Jul 1988	
424	Martin McCluskey	Labour	Inverclyde and Renfrewshire West	4 Jul 2024	25 Feb 1986	
425	Patricia Ferguson	Labour	Glasgow West	4 Jul 2024	24 Sep 1958	Chair of the Scottish Affairs Committee
426	Tracy Gilbert	Labour	Edinburgh North and Leith	4 Jul 2024		
427	Graeme Downie	Labour	Dunfermline and Dollar	4 Jul 2024	Dec 1980	
428	Dave Robertson	Labour	Lichfield	4 Jul 2024		
429	Gurinder Josan	Labour	Smethwick	4 Jul 2024	Aug 1972	
430	Warinder Juss	Labour	Wolverhampton West	4 Jul 2024	9 Nov 1963	
431	Jonathan Davies	Labour	Mid Derbyshire	4 Jul 2024		
432	Lillian Jones	Labour	Kilmarnock and Loudoun	4 Jul 2024		
433	Elaine Stewart	Labour	Ayr, Carrick and Cumnock	4 Jul 2024		
434	Alan Gemmell	Labour	Central Ayrshire	4 Jul 2024	6 Apr 1978	
435	Alan Strickland	Labour	Newton Aycliffe and Spennymoor	4 Jul 2024	Apr 1984	
436	John Grady	Labour	Glasgow East	4 Jul 2024		
437	Joani Reid	Labour	East Kilbride and Strathaven	4 Jul 2024	1985/86	
438	Scott Arthur	Labour	Edinburgh South West	4 Jul 2024	8 Jun 1969	
439	The Rt Hon Hamish Falconer	Labour	Lincoln	4 Jul 2024	20 Dec 1985	Minister for Intergovernmental Relations and European Relations
440	The Rt Hon Anneliese Midgley	Labour	Knowsley	4 Jul 2024		Parliamentary Secretary to the Treasury (Government Chief Whip in the House of Commons)
441	Michael Wheeler	Labour	Worsley and Eccles	4 Jul 2024		
442	Laurence Turner	Labour	Birmingham Northfield	4 Jul 2024	May 1988	
443	Margaret Mullane	Labour	Dagenham and Rainham	4 Jul 2024		
444	Terry Jermy	Labour	South West Norfolk	4 Jul 2024	Aug 1985	
445	Olivia Bailey	Labour	Reading West and Mid Berkshire	4 Jul 2024	17 Sep 1986	Chair of the Women and Equalities Committee
446	Peter Swallow	Labour	Bracknell	4 Jul 2024	1993	
447	Rachel Blake	Labour Co-op	Cities of London and Westminster	4 Jul 2024	1979	
448	Tom Rutland	Labour	East Worthing and Shoreham	4 Jul 2024	Feb 1992	
449	Sarah Coombes	Labour	West Bromwich	4 Jul 2024	Nov 1991	
450	Katie Lam	Conservative	Weald of Kent	4 Jul 2024	Aug 1991	Shadow Secretary of State for Housing, Communities and Local Government
451	Peter Lamb	Labour	Crawley	4 Jul 2024	1986	
452	Mark Sewards	Labour	Leeds South West and Morley	4 Jul 2024	6 Jan 1990	
453	Sean Woodcock	Labour	Banbury	4 Jul 2024	25 Apr 1986	
454	Deirdre Costigan	Labour	Ealing Southall	4 Jul 2024		
455	Blair McDougall	Labour	East Renfrewshire	4 Jul 2024	3 Jun 1978	
456	Alex Baker	Labour	Aldershot	4 Jul 2024	1982/83	
457	Alex Ballinger	Labour	Halesowen	4 Jul 2024	1982	
458	Chris Bloore	Labour	Redditch	4 Jul 2024	1983	
459	Sureena Brackenridge	Labour	Wolverhampton North East	4 Jul 2024	1975	
460	Jenny Riddell-Carpenter	Labour	Suffolk Coastal	4 Jul 2024	1986	
461	Andrew Lewin	Labour	Welwyn Hatfield	4 Jul 2024	7 Jan 1987	
462	Joshua Dean	Labour	Hertford and Stortford	4 Jul 2024	1999/2000	
463	Chris Vince	Labour Co-op	Harlow	4 Jul 2024	24 Jun 1983	
464	Will Stone	Labour	Swindon North	4 Jul 2024	1980/81	
465	Sojan Joseph	Labour	Ashford	4 Jul 2024	Sep 1983	
466	Kirsty McNeill	Labour Co-op	Midlothian	4 Jul 2024		
467	Frank McNally	Labour	Coatbridge and Bellshill	4 Jul 2024	24 Jan 1988	
468	Kenneth Stevenson	Labour	Airdrie and Shotts	4 Jul 2024	28 Oct 1963	
469	Steve Yemm	Labour	Mansfield	4 Jul 2024	25 Jan 1964	
470	Harriet Cross	Conservative	Gordon and Buchan	4 Jul 2024	1990/91	Shadow Secretary of State for Scotland
471	Shivani Raja	Conservative	Leicester East	4 Jul 2024	21 Jul 1994	
472	Robin Swann	UUP	South Antrim	4 Jul 2024	24 Sep 1971	Former Leader of the UUP (2017–2019).
473	Euan Stainbank	Labour	Falkirk	4 Jul 2024	27 Jan 2000	
474	Amanda Hack	Labour	North West Leicestershire	4 Jul 2024	Jul 1976	
475	Jayne Kirkham	Labour Co-op	Truro and Falmouth	4 Jul 2024	26 Sep 1972	
476	Perran Moon	Independent	Camborne and Redruth	4 Jul 2024	2 Apr 1970	Elected as Labour; whip suspended 20 October 2026.
477	Noah Law	Labour	St Austell and Newquay	4 Jul 2024	1994	
478	David Reed	Conservative	Exmouth and Exeter East	4 Jul 2024	Dec 1989	
479	Jo Platt	Labour Co-op	Leigh and Atherton	4 Jul 2024	15 Jun 1973	Previously served 2017–2019.
480	Antonia Bance	Labour	Tipton and Wednesbury	4 Jul 2024	1980	
481	David Baines	Labour	St Helens North	4 Jul 2024	25 Jun 1979	
482	Richard Quigley	Labour	Isle of Wight West	4 Jul 2024	Aug 1971	
483	The Rt Hon Anna Turley	Labour Co-op	Redcar	4 Jul 2024	9 Oct 1978	Previously served 2015–2019.
484	Jas Athwal	Labour	Ilford South	4 Jul 2024	7 Sep 1963	
485	Lee Pitcher	Labour	Doncaster East and the Isle of Axholme	4 Jul 2024	18 Jul 1977	
486	Neil Duncan-Jordan	Labour	Poole	4 Jul 2024	1960s	
487	Abtisam Mohamed	Labour	Sheffield Central	4 Jul 2024	May 1980	
488	Kirith Entwistle	Labour	Bolton North East	4 Jul 2024	1991	
489	Elsie Blundell	Labour	Heywood and Middleton North	4 Jul 2024	Aug 1990	
490	Sarah Hall	Labour Co-op	Warrington South	4 Jul 2024		
491	Harpreet Uppal	Labour	Huddersfield	4 Jul 2024	1982	
492	Anna Dixon	Labour	Shipley	4 Jul 2024		
493	Lloyd Hatton	Labour	South Dorset	4 Jul 2024	1995	
494	Llinos Medi	Plaid Cymru	Ynys Môn	4 Jul 2024	1981	
495	Ann Davies	Plaid Cymru	Caerfyrddin	4 Jul 2024	22 Dec 1962	
496	Gill German	Labour	Clwyd North	4 Jul 2024		
497	Claire Hughes	Labour	Bangor Aberconwy	4 Jul 2024		
498	Andrew Ranger	Labour	Wrexham	4 Jul 2024	1971	
499	Michelle Scrogham	Labour	Barrow and Furness	4 Jul 2024	Dec 1970	
500	Katrina Murray	Labour	Cumbernauld and Kirkintilloch	4 Jul 2024		
501	Mark Ferguson	Labour	Gateshead Central and Whickham	4 Jul 2024	11 Mar 1985	
502	Alice Macdonald	Labour Co-op	Norwich North	4 Jul 2024	1 Apr 1983	
503	Linsey Farnsworth	Labour	Amber Valley	4 Jul 2024	1977	
504	Joe Powell	Labour	Kensington and Bayswater	4 Jul 2024		
505	Rachel Gilmour	Liberal Democrat	Tiverton and Minehead	4 Jul 2024	13 Oct 1964	
506	Steve Race	Labour	Exeter	4 Jul 2024	1983	
507	Jacob Collier	Labour	Burton and Uttoxeter	4 Jul 2024	20 May 1997	
508	Josh Fenton-Glynn	Labour	Calder Valley	4 Jul 2024		
509	Gregor Poynton	Labour	Livingston	4 Jul 2024	1982	
510	Jon Pearce	Labour	High Peak	4 Jul 2024	29 Jul 1977	
511	Lee Barron	Labour	Corby and East Northamptonshire	4 Jul 2024	15 May 1970	
512	John Whitby	Labour	Derbyshire Dales	4 Jul 2024	1968	
513	Baggy Shanker	Labour Co-op	Derby South	4 Jul 2024		
514	Chris Kane	Labour	Stirling and Strathallan	4 Jul 2024	Aug 1976	
515	John Milne	Liberal Democrat	Horsham	4 Jul 2024	Jan 1960	
516	Alison Bennett	Liberal Democrat	Mid Sussex	4 Jul 2024		
517	Jess Brown-Fuller	Liberal Democrat	Chichester	4 Jul 2024	Aug 1990	
518	James MacCleary	Liberal Democrat	Lewes	4 Jul 2024	Nov 1980	
519	Pippa Heylings	Liberal Democrat	South Cambridgeshire	4 Jul 2024		
520	Luke Taylor	Liberal Democrat	Sutton and Cheam	4 Jul 2024		
521	Marie Goldman	Liberal Democrat	Chelmsford	4 Jul 2024		
522	Zöe Franklin	Liberal Democrat	Guildford	4 Jul 2024	1 Jun 1981	
523	Will Forster	Liberal Democrat	Woking	4 Jul 2024	15 Aug 1986	
524	Al Pinkerton	Liberal Democrat	Surrey Heath	4 Jul 2024		
525	Alison Taylor	Labour	Paisley and Renfrewshire North	4 Jul 2024		
526	Mike Tapp	Labour	Dover and Deal	4 Jul 2024	Feb 1985	
527	Chris Ward	Labour	Brighton Kemptown and Peacehaven	4 Jul 2024	1982/83	
528	Ayoub Khan	Ind. Alliance	Birmingham Perry Barr	4 Jul 2024	1972	Elected as Independent; joined Independent Alliance 2 September 2024.
529	Zubir Ahmed	Labour	Glasgow South West	4 Jul 2024	Jul 1981	
530	Steve Darling	Liberal Democrat	Torbay	4 Jul 2024	Apr 1969	
531	Marie Tidball	Labour	Penistone and Stocksbridge	4 Jul 2024	1984	
532	Alison Griffiths	Conservative	Bognor Regis and Littlehampton	4 Jul 2024	Jun 1969	
533	Sarah Russell	Labour	Congleton	4 Jul 2024		
534	Connor Naismith	Labour	Crewe and Nantwich	4 Jul 2024	1992	
535	Chris Curtis	Labour	Milton Keynes North	4 Jul 2024	17 Mar 1994	
536	Natasha Irons	Labour	Croydon East	4 Jul 2024		
537	Jess Asato	Labour	Lowestoft	4 Jul 2024	30 Apr 1981	
538	Danny Beales	Labour	Uxbridge and South Ruislip	4 Jul 2024	1988	
539	Paul Davies	Labour	Colne Valley	4 Jul 2024	6 Oct 1957	
540	Calum Miller	Liberal Democrat	Bicester and Woodstock	4 Jul 2024		
541	Alison Hume	Labour	Scarborough and Whitby	4 Jul 2024		
542	Sonia Kumar	Labour	Dudley	4 Jul 2024		
543	Angus MacDonald	Liberal Democrat	Inverness, Skye and West Ross-shire	4 Jul 2024	7 Nov 1962	
544	Chris Coghlan	Liberal Democrat	Dorking and Horley	4 Jul 2024	1981	
545	Olly Glover	Liberal Democrat	Didcot and Wantage	4 Jul 2024	1984/85	
546	Sally Jameson	Labour Co-op	Doncaster Central	4 Jul 2024		
547	Danny Chambers	Liberal Democrat	Winchester	4 Jul 2024	12 Jan 1982	
548	Tom Morrison	Liberal Democrat	Cheadle	4 Jul 2024	May 1982	
549	Victoria Collins	Liberal Democrat	Harpenden and Berkhamsted	4 Jul 2024	1987	
550	Liz Jarvis	Liberal Democrat	Eastleigh	4 Jul 2024		
551	Alex Brewer	Liberal Democrat	North East Hampshire	4 Jul 2024		
552	Darren Paffey	Labour	Southampton Itchen	4 Jul 2024		
553	Satvir Kaur	Labour	Southampton Test	4 Jul 2024	Sep 1984	
554	Tom Hayes	Labour	Bournemouth East	4 Jul 2024	26 Feb 1983	
555	David Burton-Sampson	Labour	Southend West and Leigh	4 Jul 2024	Nov 1977	
556	Charlotte Cane	Liberal Democrat	Ely and East Cambridgeshire	4 Jul 2024	3 Jun 1958	
557	Claire Young	Liberal Democrat	Thornbury and Yate	4 Jul 2024	16 Mar 1974	
558	Irene Campbell	Labour	North Ayrshire and Arran	4 Jul 2024	6 Oct 1963	
559	Maureen Burke	Labour	Glasgow North East	4 Jul 2024	29 Sep 1958	
560	Simon Opher	Labour	Stroud	4 Jul 2024	29 Jan 1964	
561	Sam Carling	Labour	North West Cambridgeshire	4 Jul 2024	2002	Baby of the House
562	Richard Tice	Reform	Boston and Skegness	4 Jul 2024	13 Sep 1964	Former Leader of Reform UK (2021–2024)
563	Rupert Lowe	Restore	Great Yarmouth	4 Jul 2024	31 Oct 1957	Leader of Restore. Elected as Reform; whip suspended 7 March 2025. Joined Restore 20 March 2026.
564	James McMurdock	Independent	South Basildon and East Thurrock	4 Jul 2024	Jun 1986	Elected as Reform; resigned whip 5 July 2025.
565	The Hon Markus Campbell-Savours	Labour	Penrith and Solway	4 Jul 2024	Jan 1981	
566	John Slinger	Labour	Rugby	4 Jul 2024	Jan 1975	
567	Catherine Fookes	Labour	Monmouthshire	4 Jul 2024	21 Oct 1970	
568	Kate Dearden	Labour Co-op	Halifax	4 Jul 2024	Apr 1994	
569	Connor Rand	Labour	Altrincham and Sale West	4 Jul 2024		
570	Patrick Hurley	Labour	Southport	4 Jul 2024	25 Aug 1976	
571	Nesil Caliskan	Labour	Barking	4 Jul 2024	27 Oct 1988	
572	Naushabah Khan	Labour	Gillingham and Rainham	4 Jul 2024	26 Feb 1986	
573	Lauren Edwards	Labour	Rochester and Strood	4 Jul 2024		
574	Samantha Niblett	Labour	South Derbyshire	4 Jul 2024	Dec 1979	
575	Dan Aldridge	Labour	Weston-super-Mare	4 Jul 2024	24 Aug 1984	
576	Gordon McKee	Labour	Glasgow South	4 Jul 2024	30 Sep 1994	
577	Chris Hinchliff	Labour	North East Hertfordshire	4 Jul 2024	Dec 1993	
578	Louise Sandher-Jones	Labour	North East Derbyshire	4 Jul 2024	1989/90	
579	Rachel Taylor	Labour	North Warwickshire and Bedworth	4 Jul 2024		
580	Jeevun Sandher	Labour	Loughborough	4 Jul 2024	Sep 1990	
581	James Asser	Labour	West Ham and Beckton	4 Jul 2024	2 Jul 1975	
582	Andrew Pakes	Labour Co-op	Peterborough	4 Jul 2024	24 Apr 1973	
583	Helena Dollimore	Labour Co-op	Hastings and Rye	4 Jul 2024	1994	
584	Jim Dickson	Labour	Dartford	4 Jul 2024	16 Jan 1964	
585	Jake Richards	Labour	Rother Valley	4 Jul 2024	5 Jul 1989	
586	Jonathan Hinder	Labour	Pendle and Clitheroe	4 Jul 2024	3 Mar 1991	
587	Mike Martin	Liberal Democrat	Tunbridge Wells	4 Jul 2024		
588	Peter Fortune	Conservative	Bromley and Biggin Hill	4 Jul 2024	Aug 1978	
589	Kirsteen Sullivan	Labour Co-op	Bathgate and Linlithgow	4 Jul 2024	Jul 1975	
590	Daniel Francis	Labour	Bexleyheath and Crayford	4 Jul 2024		
591	Edward Morello	Liberal Democrat	West Dorset	4 Jul 2024		
592	Phil Brickell	Labour	Bolton West	4 Jul 2024	1986/87	
593	Rosie Wrighting	Labour	Kettering	4 Jul 2024	28 Jul 1997	
594	Fred Thomas	Labour	Plymouth Moor View	4 Jul 2024	Mar 1992	
595	Sarah Sackman	Labour	Finchley and Golders Green	4 Jul 2024	Oct 1984	
596	Sam Rushworth	Labour	Bishop Auckland	4 Jul 2024	1984	
597	Kevin Bonavia	Labour	Stevenage	4 Jul 2024	1978	
598	Kevin McKenna	Labour	Sittingbourne and Sheppey	4 Jul 2024	1974	
599	Jade Botterill	Labour	Ossett and Denby Dale	4 Jul 2024	Dec 1990	
600	Imogen Walker	Labour	Hamilton and Clyde Valley	4 Jul 2024		
601	Ben Coleman	Labour	Chelsea and Fulham	4 Jul 2024	Jul 1962	
602	John Cooper	Conservative	Dumfries and Galloway	4 Jul 2024	11 Feb 1967	
603	Tom Collins	Labour	Worcester	4 Jul 2024		
604	David Chadwick	Liberal Democrat	Brecon, Radnor and Cwm Tawe	4 Jul 2024	1992	
605	Paul Waugh	Labour Co-op	Rochdale	4 Jul 2024	1966/67	
606	Josh Newbury	Labour	Cannock Chase	4 Jul 2024		
607	Cameron Thomas	Independent	Tewkesbury	4 Jul 2024	Dec 1982	Elected as Liberal Democrat, whip suspended 18 June 2026
608	Anna Gelderd	Labour	South East Cornwall	4 Jul 2024	3 Jul 1986	
609	Julia Buckley	Labour	Shrewsbury	4 Jul 2024		
610	Matt Turmaine	Labour	Watford	4 Jul 2024	1969	
611	Cat Eccles	Labour	Stourbridge	4 Jul 2024		
612	Jodie Gosling	Labour	Nuneaton	4 Jul 2024	4 Jul 1972	
613	Josh MacAlister	Labour	Whitehaven and Workington	4 Jul 2024	Mar 1987	
614	Charlie Maynard	Liberal Democrat	Witney	4 Jul 2024	Feb 1971	
615	Helen Maguire	Liberal Democrat	Epsom and Ewell	4 Jul 2024	11 Jul 1977	
616	Alistair Carns	Labour	Birmingham Selly Oak	4 Jul 2024	27 Mar 1980	
617	Georgia Gould	Labour	Queen's Park and Maida Vale	4 Jul 2024	18 May 1986	
618	Torcuil Crichton	Labour	Na h-Eileanan an Iar	4 Jul 2024	Dec 1964	
619	Becky Gittins	Labour	Clwyd East	4 Jul 2024	1994	
620	James Frith	Labour	Bury North	4 Jul 2024	23 Apr 1977	Previously served 2017–2019.
621	Nick Timothy	Conservative	West Suffolk	4 Jul 2024	Mar 1980	Shadow Secretary of State for Justice and Shadow Lord Chancellor
622	The Hon Liam Conlon	Labour	Beckenham and Penge	4 Jul 2024	Mar 1988	
623	The Rt Hon Miatta Fahnbulleh	Labour Co-op	Peckham	4 Jul 2024	29 Sep 1979	Secretary of State for Energy Security and Net Zero
624	Josh Simons	Labour	Makerfield	4 Jul 2024	24 Jul 1993	Resigned 18 May 2026, triggering the 2026 Makerfield by-election.
625	Lewis Atkinson	Labour	Sunderland Central	4 Jul 2024	1983	
626	Tim Roca	Labour	Macclesfield	4 Jul 2024	14 Nov 1985	
627	Amanda Martin	Labour	Portsmouth North	4 Jul 2024		
628	Michelle Welsh	Labour	Sherwood Forest	4 Jul 2024		
629	Nigel Farage	Reform	Clacton	4 Jul 2024	3 Apr 1964	Leader of Reform UK. Resigned 8 July 2026, triggering the 2026 Clacton by-election, in which he was subsequently re-elected (see entry #649).
630	Andrew Cooper	Labour	Mid Cheshire	4 Jul 2024	Feb 1984	
631	Jen Craft	Labour	Thurrock	4 Jul 2024	1985/86	
632	Paul Kohler	Liberal Democrat	Wimbledon	4 Jul 2024	15 Mar 1959	
633	Graham Leadbitter	SNP	Moray West, Nairn and Strathspey	4 Jul 2024		
634	Sarah Smith	Labour	Hyndburn	4 Jul 2024	c. 1986	
635	Shockat Adam	Ind. Alliance	Leicester South	4 Jul 2024	Nov 1972	Elected as Independent; joined Independent Alliance 2 September 2024.
636	Iqbal Mohamed	Ind. Alliance	Dewsbury and Batley	4 Jul 2024	1970/71	Elected as Independent; joined Independent Alliance 2 September 2024.
637	Mary Creagh	Labour	Coventry East	4 Jul 2024	2 Dec 1967	Previously served 2005–2019.
638	Natalie Fleet	Labour	Bolsover	4 Jul 2024	24 May 1984	
639	Pam Cox	Labour	Colchester	4 Jul 2024		
640	Tony Vaughan	Labour	Folkestone and Hythe	4 Jul 2024	Mar 1982	
641	Uma Kumaran	Labour	Stratford and Bow	4 Jul 2024		
642	Steve Witherden	Labour	Montgomeryshire and Glyndŵr	4 Jul 2024		
643	Adnan Hussain	Ind. Alliance	Blackburn	4 Jul 2024	Jul 1989	Elected as Independent; joined Independent Alliance 2 September 2024.
644	Sarah Pochin	Reform	Runcorn and Helsby	1 May 2025	Jun 1969	Elected at the 2025 Runcorn and Helsby by-election.
645	Hannah Spencer	Green	Gorton and Denton	26 Feb 2026	19 Apr 1991	Elected at the 2026 Gorton and Denton by-election.
646	Lara Bird	SNP	Arbroath and Broughty Ferry	18 Jun 2026	1998	Elected at the 2026 Arbroath and Broughty Ferry by-election.
647	Douglas Lumsden	Conservative	Aberdeen South	18 Jun 2026	31 Aug 1971	Elected at the 2026 Aberdeen South by-election.
648	The Rt Hon Andy Burnham	Labour Co-op	Makerfield	18 Jun 2026	7 Jan 1970	Prime Minister and Leader of the Labour Party. Elected at the 2026 Makerfield by-election. Previously served 2001–2017.
649	Nigel Farage	Reform	Clacton	13 Aug 2026	3 Apr 1964	Leader of Reform UK. Elected at the 2026 Clacton by-election. Previously served 2024–2026 (see entry #629).
650	Sagal Abdi-Wali	Labour	Holborn and St Pancras	8 Oct 2026	1984	Elected at the 2026 Holborn and St Pancras by-election.
Members who have never been sworn in
–	Paul Maskey	Sinn Féin	Belfast West	9 Jun 2011	10 Jun 1967	Elected at the 2011 Belfast West by-election.
–	Chris Hazzard	Sinn Féin	South Down	8 Jun 2017	20 Aug 1984	
–	Órfhlaith Begley	Sinn Féin	West Tyrone	3 May 2018	19 Dec 1991	Elected at the 2018 West Tyrone by-election.
–	John Finucane	Sinn Féin	Belfast North	12 Dec 2019	1980	
–	Pat Cullen	Sinn Féin	Fermanagh and South Tyrone	4 Jul 2024	2 Jun 1965	
–	Dáire Hughes	Sinn Féin	Newry and Armagh	4 Jul 2024	1990	
–	Cathal Mallaghan	Sinn Féin	Mid Ulster	4 Jul 2024	Dec 1982	

== See also ==
- List of MPs elected in the 2024 United Kingdom general election
- List of United Kingdom by-elections (2010–present)
