= Holborn and St Pancras =

UK Parliament constituency (since 1983)

Coordinates: 51.535°N 0.135°W

- Borough constituency for the House of Commons
- Interactive map of boundaries from 2024
- Location within Greater London
- County: Greater London
- Electorate: 75,475 (March 2020)

Current constituency
- Created: 1983
- Member of Parliament: Sagal Abdi-Wali (Labour)
- Seats: One
- Created from: St Pancras North and Holborn & St Pancras South

Holborn and St Pancras (/ˈhoʊbərn ən sənt ˈpæŋkrəs/) is a parliamentary constituency in Greater London that was created in 1983. It is represented by Sagal Abdi-Wali, who was elected on 8 October 2026. From 2015 to 2026 it was represented in the House of Commons of the UK Parliament by Sir Keir Starmer, who served as Prime Minister from 2024 to 2026 and Leader of the Labour Party from 2020 to 2026. He announced his resignation from parliament on 1 September 2026, triggering the 2026 Holborn and St Pancras by-election.

== Constituency ==
Holborn and St Pancras as drawn in 2010 included all but a small western portion of the London Borough of Camden. After the completion of the 2023 review of Westminster constituencies, boundary changes led to 29.7% of the geographical area of the constituency transferring to the Hampstead and Highgate constituency for the 2024 general election.

Within the constituency, 18.5% of people are living in fuel poverty (2023), 36.3% of children are living in poverty (2024) and 16.7% of people are considered to have a disability (2024). There is a higher than national average number of people living in social housing or in private rented accommodation (2024). King's Cross, St Pancras International, and Euston railway termini are within the geographical area.

=== Political history ===
Labour Party MPs have served this constituency since its creation in 1983. The majorities achieved have been varied, from a relatively marginal 13.9% in 2005 (making it within the lowest 150 seats for the party in that year by percentage of majority) to a landslide 51.7% in 2017. The 2015 result ranked the seat as the 77th safest of the party's 232 seats (by percentage majority). Political groups active in the constituency include Camden Labour Left.

== Boundaries ==
=== Historic ===
The seat was created in 1983 as a successor to Holborn and St Pancras South. The constituency has contained the following wards of the London Borough of Camden:

1983–1997

Bloomsbury, Brunswick, Camden, Castlehaven, Caversham, Chalk Farm, Gospel Oak, Grafton, Holborn, King's Cross, Regent's Park, St John's, St Pancras, and Somers Town.

1997–2010

As above, less Gospel Oak.

Map of boundaries 2010–2024.

2010–2024

Bloomsbury, Camden Town with Primrose Hill, Cantelowes, Gospel Oak, Haverstock, Highgate, Holborn and Covent Garden, Kentish Town, King's Cross, Regent's Park, and St Pancras and Somers Town.

The fifth periodic review of Westminster constituencies by the Boundary Commission for England was implemented nationally in 2010. Parts of Highgate, Gospel Oak, Haverstock, Camden Town and Primrose Hill wards were transferred from the former constituency of Hampstead and Highgate, when it was abolished.

=== Current ===
Further to the 2023 review of Westminster constituencies, which came into effect for the 2024 general election, the constituency is composed of the following London Borough of Camden wards:

- Bloomsbury; Camden Square; Camden Town; Haverstock; Holborn and Covent Garden; Kentish Town North; Kentish Town South; King's Cross; Primrose Hill (part); Regent's Park; St. Pancras and Somers Town.

== Members of Parliament ==
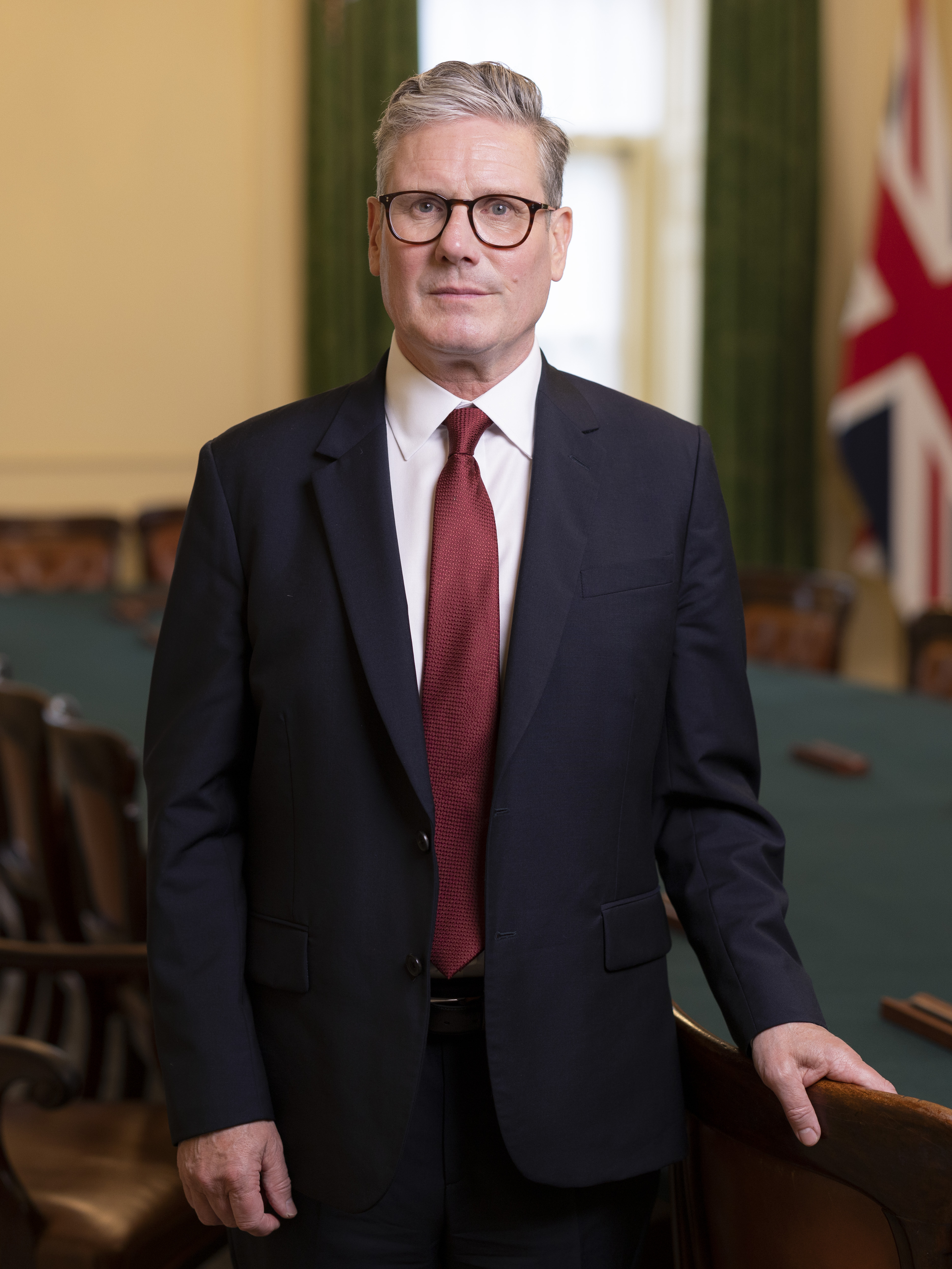
Keir Starmer represented the constituency from 2015 until his resignation in 2026.

The seat was held from 1983 to 2015 by Frank Dobson of the Labour Party, who had been elected in 1979 to the predecessor seat of Holborn & St Pancras South. Dobson was the longest-serving Labour MP in London until he stood down in 2015. The constituency has been represented by Keir Starmer from the 2015 general election until his resignation in 2026. Starmer served as Leader of the Labour Party (consequently Leader of the Opposition until his 2024 election victory) from April 2020 to July 2026, and the Prime Minister from July 2024 to July 2026.

Election	Member	Party	Notes
1983	Frank Dobson	Labour	Secretary of State for Health (1997–1999)
2015	Keir Starmer	Labour	Leader of the Labour Party (2020–2026); Prime Minister of the United Kingdom (2024–2026)
2026 by-election	Sagal Abdi-Wali	Labour	

== Election results ==
Election results (1983–2026)

=== Elections in the 2020s ===
2026 Holborn and St Pancras by-election
Party	Candidate	Votes	%	±%
Labour	Sagal Abdi-Wali	12,292	45.2	−3.7
Green	Zack Polanski	8,928	32.8	+22.4
Conservative	Ewan Cameron	1,922	7.1	−0.1
Reform	Peter Newman	1,612	5.9	−0.2
Liberal Democrats	Patrick Stillman	924	3.4	−2.4
Restore	Tyler Johnson	692	2.5	N/A
Workers Party	George Galloway	314	1.1	N/A
Rejoin EU	Briony Kapoor	236	0.8	N/A
Monster Raving Loony	Barmy Brunch	87	0.3	−0.1
CPA	Helen Spiby-Vann	63	0.2	N/A
Climate	Clare Fischer	51	0.2	N/A
UKIP	Ben Walker	51	0.2	±0.0
UK Voice	Ketankumar Pipaliya	23	0.1	N/A
Communist League	Jonathan Silberman	9	0.03	N/A
No description (Note: Darwood had no description on the statement of persons nominated. Some sources have referred to him as an independent.)	Tom Darwood	7	0.03	N/A
Majority		3,364	12.4	−17.6
Turnout		27,211	38.8	−15.3
Rejected ballots		108	0.4	
Registered electors		70,449		
Labour hold		Swing	-13.1	

General election 2024: Holborn and St Pancras
Party	Candidate	Votes	%	±%
Labour	Keir Starmer	18,884	48.9	−17.4
Independent	Andrew Feinstein	7,312	18.9	N/A
Green	David Stansell	4,030	10.4	+6.4
Conservative	Mehreen Malik	2,776	7.2	−8.0
Reform	David Roberts	2,371	6.1	+4.2
Liberal Democrats	Charlie Clinton	2,236	5.8	−6.5
Independent	Wais Islam	636	1.6	N/A
Monster Raving Loony	Nick the Incredible Flying Brick	162	0.4	N/A
UKIP	John Poynton	75	0.2	−0.1
Socialist Equality	Tom Scripps	61	0.2	+0.1
Independent	Senthil Kumar	40	0.1	N/A
No description	Bobby Smith	19	0.0	N/A
Majority		11,572	30.0	−21.1
Turnout		38,602	54.1	−5.0
Registered electors		71,300		
Labour hold		Swing		

=== Elections in the 2010s ===
2019 notional result
Party	Vote	%
Labour	29,537	66.3
Conservative	6,771	15.2
Liberal Democrats	5,473	12.3
Green	1,790	4.0
Brexit Party	836	1.9
Others	175	0.4
Turnout	44,582	59.1
Electorate	75,475	

General election 2019: Holborn and St Pancras
Party	Candidate	Votes	%	±%
Labour	Keir Starmer	36,641	64.5	−5.6
Conservative	Alexandra Hayward	8,878	15.6	−2.8
Liberal Democrats	Matthew Kirk	7,314	12.9	+6.1
Green	Kirsten De Keyser	2,746	4.8	+1.4
Brexit Party	Hector Birchwood	1,032	1.8	N/A
UKIP	Mohammad Bhatti	138	0.2	−1.0
Socialist Equality	Thomas Scripps	37	0.1	N/A
Majority		27,763	48.9	−2.8
Turnout		56,786	65.1	−1.9
Registered electors		87,236		
Labour hold		Swing	−1.4	

General election 2017: Holborn and St Pancras
Party	Candidate	Votes	%	±%
Labour	Keir Starmer	41,343	70.1	+17.2
Conservative	Timothy Barnes	10,834	18.4	−3.5
Liberal Democrats	Stephen Crosher	4,020	6.8	+0.3
Green	Siân Berry	1,980	3.4	−9.4
UKIP	Giles Game	727	1.2	−3.8
English Democrat	Janus Polenceus	93	0.2	N/A
Majority		30,509	51.7	+20.7
Turnout		58,997	67.0	+3.7
Registered electors		88,088		
Labour hold		Swing	+10.3	

General election 2015: Holborn and St Pancras
Party	Candidate	Votes	%	±%
Labour	Keir Starmer	29,062	52.9	+6.8
Conservative	Will Blair	12,014	21.9	+1.5
Green	Natalie Bennett	7,013	12.8	+10.1
Liberal Democrats	Jill Fraser	3,555	6.5	−21.4
UKIP	Maxine Spencer	2,740	5.0	+3.9
CISTA	Shane O'Donnell	252	0.5	N/A
Animal Welfare	Vanessa Hudson	173	0.3	N/A
Socialist Equality	David O'Sullivan	108	0.2	N/A
Majority		17,048	31.0	+13.2
Turnout		54,917	63.3	+0.4
Registered electors		86,764		
Labour hold		Swing	+2.6	

General election 2010: Holborn and St Pancras
Party	Candidate	Votes	%	±%
Labour	Frank Dobson	25,198	46.1	+1.0
Liberal Democrats	Jo Shaw	15,256	27.9	+1.8
Conservative	George Lee	11,134	20.4	−0.5
Green	Natalie Bennett	1,480	2.7	−4.8
BNP	Robert Carlyle	779	1.4	N/A
UKIP	Max Spencer	587	1.1	N/A
Independent	John Chapman	96	0.2	N/A
English Democrat	Mikel Susperregi	75	0.1	N/A
Independent	Iain Meek	44	0.1	N/A
Majority		9,942	18.2	
Turnout		54,649	62.9	
Registered electors		86,563		
Labour hold		Swing		

=== Elections in the 2000s ===
General election 2005: Holborn and St Pancras
Party	Candidate	Votes	%	±%
Labour	Frank Dobson	14,857	43.2	−10.7
Liberal Democrats	Jill Fraser	10,070	29.3	+11.3
Conservative	Margot James	6,482	18.9	+2.0
Green	Adrian J. Oliver	2,798	8.1	+2.1
Rainbow Dream Ticket	Rainbow George Weiss	152	0.4	N/A
Majority		4,787	13.9	−22.0
Turnout		34,359	50.4	+0.8
Registered electors		68,327		
Labour hold		Swing	−11.0	

General election 2001: Holborn and St Pancras
Party	Candidate	Votes	%	±%
Labour	Frank Dobson	16,770	53.9	−11.1
Liberal Democrats	Nathaniel Green	5,595	18.0	+5.5
Conservative	Roseanne Serrelli	5,258	16.9	−1.0
Green	Robert Whitley	1,875	6.0	N/A
Socialist Alliance	Candy Udwin	971	3.1	N/A
Socialist Labour	Novjot (Joti) Brar	359	1.2	N/A
UKIP	Magnus Nielsen	301	1.0	N/A
Majority		11,175	35.9	−11.2
Turnout		31,129	49.6	−10.7
Registered electors		62,722		
Labour hold		Swing	−8.3	

=== Elections in the 1990s ===
General election 1997: Holborn and St Pancras
Party	Candidate	Votes	%	±%
Labour	Frank Dobson	24,707	65.0	+10.8
Conservative	Julian L. Smith	6,804	17.9	−10.3
Liberal Democrats	Justine McGuiness	4,758	12.5	−1.4
Referendum	Julia T.G. Carr	790	2.1	N/A
Natural Law	Timothy P.J. Bedding	191	0.5	0.0
Independent	Stephen Smith	173	0.5	N/A
Workers Revolutionary	Brigid Conway	171	0.4	N/A
Rainbow Dream Ticket	Martin Rosenthal	157	0.4	N/A
Independent	Peter Rice-Evans	140	0.4	N/A
ProLife Alliance	Bruno F. Quintavalle	114	0.3	N/A
Majority		17,903	47.1	+20.4
Turnout		38,005	60.3	−2.4
Registered electors		63,037		
Labour hold		Swing	+10.5	

General election 1992: Holborn and St Pancras
Party	Candidate	Votes	%	±%
Labour	Frank Dobson	22,243	54.8	+4.2
Conservative	Andrew J. McHallam	11,419	28.1	−3.0
Liberal Democrats	Jennifer Horne-Roberts	5,476	13.5	−4.1
Green	Paul A. Wolf-Light	959	2.4	N/A
Natural Law	Mark K. Hersey	212	0.5	N/A
Socialist (GB)	Richard Headicar	175	0.4	N/A
Independent	Nigel Lewis	133	0.3	N/A
Majority		10,824	26.7	+7.2
Turnout		40,617	62.7	−1.6
Registered electors		64,480		
Labour hold		Swing	+3.6	

=== Elections in the 1980s ===
General election 1987: Holborn and St Pancras
Party	Candidate	Votes	%	±%
Labour	Frank Dobson	22,966	50.6	+3.1
Conservative	Peter Luff	14,113	31.1	+0.4
Liberal	Simon McGrath	7,994	17.6	−3.8
Red Front	Michael Gavan	300	0.7	N/A
Majority		8,853	19.5	+2.7
Turnout		45,373	64.3	+4.1
Registered electors		70,589		
Labour hold		Swing		

General election 1983: Holborn and St Pancras
Party	Candidate	Votes	%	±%
Labour	Frank Dobson	20,486	47.5	
Conservative	Tony Kerpel	13,227	30.7	
Liberal	William Jones	9,242	21.4	
Workers Revolutionary	R. Price	155	0.4	
Majority		7,259	16.8	
Turnout		43,110	60.2	
Registered electors		71,604		
Labour win (new seat)				

== See also ==
- Parliamentary constituencies in London

== Notes ==
Parliament of the United Kingdom
Preceded by Islington North	Constituency represented by the leader of the opposition 2020–2024	Succeeded by Richmond and Northallerton
Preceded by Richmond and Northallerton	Constituency represented by the prime minister 2024–2026	Succeeded by Makerfield
