= Danny Beales =

British politician (born 1988)

Danny Beales MP
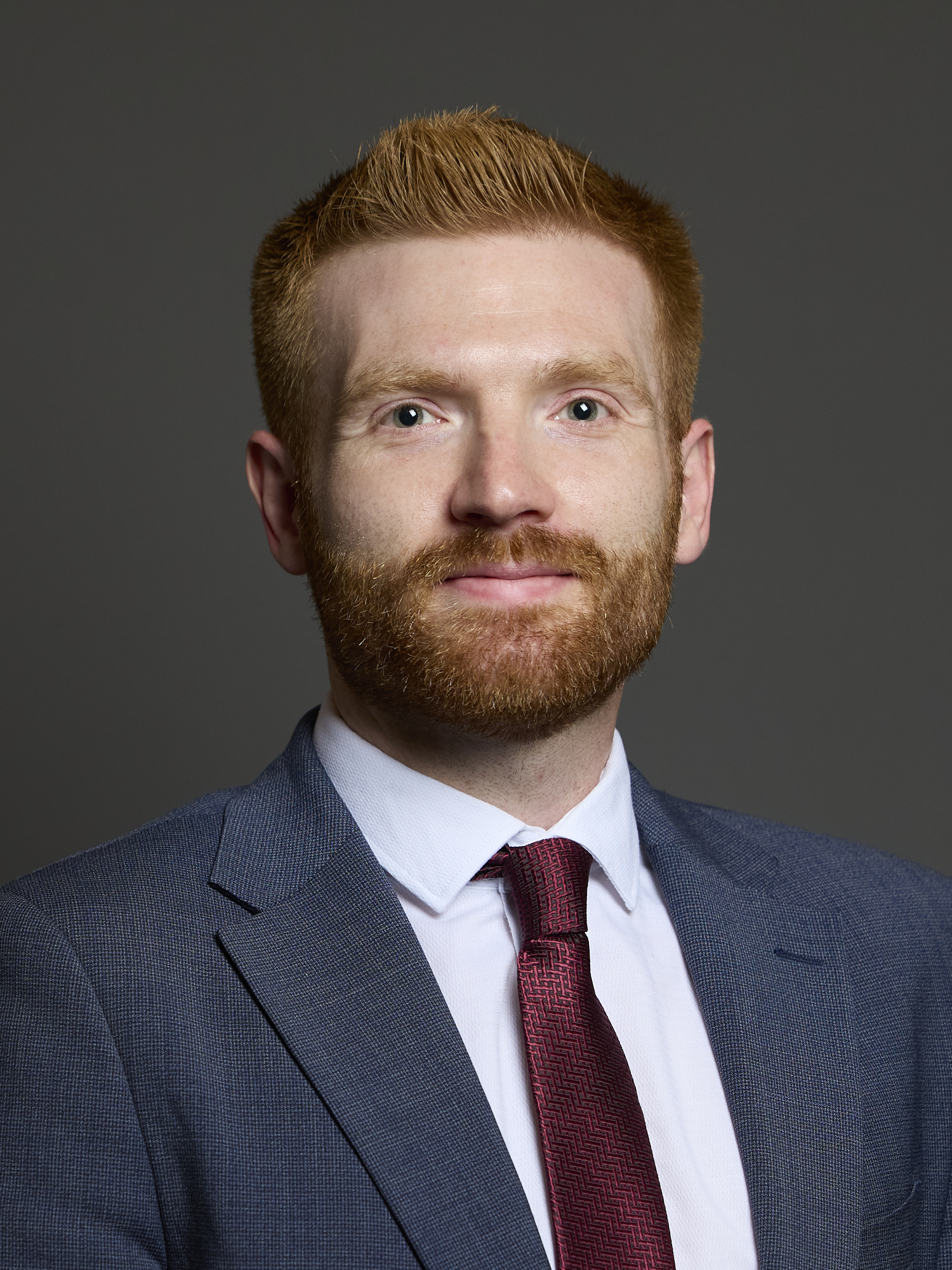
- Official portrait, 2024

Member of Parliament for Uxbridge and South Ruislip
- Incumbent
- Assumed office 4 July 2024
- Preceded by: Steve Tuckwell
- Majority: 587 (1.3%)

Member of Camden Borough Council for Camden Square Cantelowes (2014–2022)
- In office 22 May 2014 – 12 July 2024
- Preceded by: Paul Braithwaite
- Succeeded by: Patricia Leman

Personal details
- Born: Danny Boy Beales; 1988 (age 37–38) Hillingdon, London, England
- Party: Labour
- Education: London School of Economics (BSc, MSc)

Danny Boy Beales (born 1988) is a British politician who has been the Member of Parliament for Uxbridge and South Ruislip since 2024. A member of the Labour Party, he was previously a member of Camden London Borough Council from 2014 until his election to Parliament.

== Early life ==
Danny Boy Beales was born in 1988 at Hillingdon Hospital. He was raised in South Ruislip by his mother, a single parent. He was made homeless twice while a teenager, both times after his mother was made redundant from work, living for a while with his grandparents in Northampton, and then in a council house in the area. He benefitted from an Education Maintenance Allowance (EMA), allowing him to complete his A-Levels. He joined the Labour Party around this time, frustrated by the financial difficulties his family faced. Beales studied politics and social policy at the London School of Economics.

== Political career ==
=== Camden Council ===
Following his studies, Beales went on to work in campaigning and communications with the Labour Party.

He was first elected at the 2014 Camden London Borough Council election, and was re-elected at the next two subsequent council elections. Beales was initially elected to represent Cantelowes, unseating the ward's sole Liberal Democrat councillor. Cantelowes was abolished for the 2022 elections, and Beales was subsequently elected for the Camden Square ward. He was a governor at Torriano Primary School, on his local street.

Since his election, Beales has been one of the most high-profile councillors, with the local paper writing of him, "With an ever-expanding brief, Cllr Beales has been there for every Camden policy, every flashpoint." He is quoted nearly every week in the local press.

Beales served as Camden Council's Cabinet Member for New Homes, Jobs and Community Investment. In this role he was responsible for the Community Investment Programmes which is Camden's estate regeneration and property development programme. CIP - and Beales personally - has been criticised on a cross-party basis for failing to meet its own target for building council homes and for allowing private developers to 'seize' part of sites for their own use.

He supported adding a pedestrian crossing in Camden with the transgender flag, the first of its kind in London.

Beales resigned from being a Camden councillor on 12 July 2024, a week after being elected as an MP.

=== Uxbridge and South Ruislip by-election ===
In December 2022, Beales was selected as the Labour candidate for Uxbridge and South Ruislip to become the candidate at the by-election, which was announced less than a day after the constituency's MP, former Prime Minister Boris Johnson, had resigned. This was just prior to the publication of the Commons Privileges Committee investigation into Johnson's involvement in Partygate. Beales then began campaigning with the party's national campaign co-ordinator, Shabana Mahmood. He remained a Camden Council Cabinet Member throughout the by-election.

During campaigning, Beales challenged the Mayor of London Sadiq Khan's policy to expand the Ultra Low Emission Zone into outer London, including Uxbridge and South Ruislip. Beales suggested the scheme should be delayed, while the successful Conservative candidate, Steve Tuckwell, wanted to scrap the scheme completely.

=== 2024 general election ===
Beales was reselected as the Labour candidate for the 2024 general election. This time, he won narrowly over Tuckwell, defeating him by 587 votes.

In November 2024, Beales voted in favour of the Terminally Ill Adults (End of Life) Bill, which proposes to legalise assisted suicide.

Since 2024, Beales has served as a member of the Health and Social Care Select Committee.

== Personal life ==
Beales is a gay man.

== Electoral results ==
2014 Camden local election - Cantelowes ward (3 seats)
Party	Candidate	Votes	%	±%
Labour	Danny Beales	2,002	56.1	+23.1
Labour	Phil Jones *	1,966	55.1	+16.1
Labour	Angela Mason *	1,899	53.3	+13.2
Liberal Democrats	Paul Braithwaite *	725	20.3	−17.2
Green	Fran Bury	639	17.9	+3.7
Green	Fiona Ann Firman	632	17.7	+8.8
Green	Victoria Green	546	15.3	+9.1
Conservative	Robyn Gardner	375	10.5	−3.0
Conservative	Robert Anthony Ricketts	361	10.1	−3.2
Liberal Democrats	Margaret Jackson-Roberts	355	10.0	−22.0
Conservative	Will Timmins	346	9.7	−2.3
Liberal Democrats	Catherine Felicity Jane Sinclair Jones	344	9.6	−19.1
Turnout		10,221	40.6	
Labour hold		Swing		
Labour hold		Swing		
Labour gain from Liberal Democrats		Swing		

2018 Camden local election - Cantelowes ward (3 seats)
Party	Candidate	Votes	%	±%
Labour	Angela Mason *	1,829	59.8	+6.5
Labour	Danny Beales *	1,780	58.2	+2.1
Labour	Ranjit Singh	1,503	49.1	−6.0
Liberal Democrats	Catherine Wakefield Hays	804	26.3	+6.0
Liberal Democrats	Christopher William Hattam	488	16.0	+6.0
Green	Fran Bury	449	14.7	−3.2
Liberal Democrats	Max Karasinski	442	14.5	+4.9
Green	Catherine Anee Keshishian	435	14.2	−3.5
Green	Trevor O'Farrell	301	9.8	−5.5
Conservative	Ben Tansey	276	9.0	−1.5
Conservative	Robert Fox	270	8.8	−1.3
Conservative	Alexi Susiluoto	240	7.8	−1.9
Turnout			36.19	
Labour hold		Swing		
Labour hold		Swing		
Labour hold		Swing		

2022 Camden local election - Camden Square ward (2 seats)
Party	Candidate	Votes	%
Labour	Danny Beales^{†}	1,309	74.0
Labour	Sagal Abdi-Wali	1,275	72.1
Liberal Democrats	Anne Wright	244	13.8
Liberal Democrats	Lawrence Nicholson	218	12.3
Conservative	Catherine McQueen	180	10.2
Conservative	Jack Tinley	146	8.3
Turnout		1,769	31.8
Labour win (new seat)			
Labour win (new seat)			

2023 Uxbridge and South Ruislip by-election
Party	Candidate	Votes	%	±%
Conservative	Steve Tuckwell	13,965	45.2	−7.4
Labour	Danny Beales	13,470	43.6	+6.0
Green	Sarah Green	893	2.9	+0.7
Reclaim	Laurence Fox	714	2.3	New
Liberal Democrats	Blaise Baquiche	526	1.7	−4.6
SDP	Steve Gardner	248	0.8	New
Independent	Kingsley Hamilton Anti-Ulez	208	0.7	New
Count Binface	Count Binface	190	0.6	+0.5
Independent	No-Ulez Leo Phaure	186	0.6	New
Rejoin EU	Richard Hewison	105	0.3	New
Let London Live	Piers Corbyn	101	0.3	New
Independent	Cameron Bell	91	0.3	New
CPA	Enomfon Ntefon	78	0.3	New
UKIP	Rebecca Jane	61	0.2	−0.4
Climate	Ed Gemmell	49	0.2	New
Monster Raving Loony	Howling Laud Hope	32	0.1	−0.2
Independent	77 Joseph	8	< 0.1	New
Majority		495	1.6	−13.4
Turnout		30,925	46.2	▼17.3
Registered electors				
Conservative hold		Swing	-6.7	

General election 2024: Uxbridge and South Ruislip
Party	Candidate	Votes	%	±%
Labour	Danny Beales	16,599	36.2	–0.8
Conservative	Steve Tuckwell	16,012	34.9	–17.7
Reform	Tim Wheeler	6,610	14.4	N/A
Green	Sarah Green	4,354	9.5	+6.8
Liberal Democrats	Ian Rex-Hawkes	1,752	3.8	–2.8
TUSC	Gary Harbord	223	0.5	N/A
SDP	Stephen Gardner	200	0.4	N/A
UKIP	Geoff Courtenay	164	0.4	+0.2
Majority		587	1.3	N/A
Turnout		45,914	61.4	–6.3
Registered electors		74,746		
Labour gain from Conservative		Swing	▲8.5	
