= Cantelowes (ward) =

Former ward in the London Borough of Camden

- Former electoral ward for the Camden London Borough Council
- Cantelowes ward boundaries
- Borough: Camden
- County: Greater London
- Population: 11,925 (2011)
- Electorate: 7,368 (2002); 8,494 (2018)

Former electoral ward
- Created: 2002
- Abolished: 2022
- Councillors: 3
- Replaced by: Camden Square, Camden Town, Kentish Town South
- ONS code: 00AGGG
- GSS code: E05000131

Cantelowes was an electoral ward in the London Borough of Camden, in the United Kingdom. The ward was created in 2002 and abolished in 2022. It was first used for the 2002 elections and last used for the 2018 elections. It covered an area between Kentish Town Road and York Way.

The population of the ward at the 2011 Census was 11,925. Most of its area became part of the newly created Camden Square and Kentish Town South wards, with a small area becoming part of the Camden Town ward.

== List of councillors ==
Term	Councillor	Party
2002–2006	Dermot Greene	Labour
2002–2006	Gerald Harrison	Labour
2002–2006	Judith Pattison	Labour
2006–2014	Paul Braithwaite	Liberal Democrats
2006–2010	Benjamin Rawlings	Liberal Democrats
2006–2010	Frederic Carver	Liberal Democrats
2010–2022	Angela Mason	Labour
2010–2018	Phil Jones	Labour
2014–2022	Danny Beales	Labour
2018–2022	Ranjit Singh	Labour

== Summary ==
Councillors elected by party at each general borough election.

- Labour
- Liberal Democrats

== Camden council elections ==
=== 2018 election ===
The election took place on 3 May 2018.

2018 Camden London Borough Council election: Cantelowes
Party	Candidate	Votes	%	±%
Labour	Angela Mason	1,829	59.8	+6.5
Labour	Danny Beales	1,780	58.2	+2.1
Labour	Ranjit Singh	1,503	49.1	−6.0
Liberal Democrats	Catherine Hays	804	26.3	+6.0
Liberal Democrats	Christopher Hattam	488	16.0	+6.0
Green	Fran Bury	449	14.7	−3.2
Liberal Democrats	Max Karasinski	442	14.5	+4.9
Green	Catherine Keshishian	435	14.2	−3.5
Green	Trevor O'Farrell	301	9.8	−5.5
Conservative	Ben Tansey	276	9.0	−1.5
Conservative	Robert Fox	270	8.8	−1.3
Conservative	Alexi Susiluoto	240	7.8	−1.9
Turnout			36.19	
Labour hold		Swing		
Labour hold		Swing		
Labour hold		Swing		

=== 2014 election ===
The election took place on 22 May 2014.

2014 Camden London Borough Council election: Cantelowes
Party	Candidate	Votes	%	±%
Labour	Danny Beales	2,002	56.1	+23.1
Labour	Phil Jones	1,966	55.1	+16.1
Labour	Angela Mason	1,899	53.3	+13.2
Liberal Democrats	Paul Braithwaite	725	20.3	−17.2
Green	Fran Bury	639	17.9	+3.7
Green	Fiona Firman	632	17.7	+8.8
Green	Victoria Green	546	15.3	+9.1
Conservative	Robyn Gardner	375	10.5	−3.0
Conservative	Robert Ricketts	361	10.1	−3.2
Liberal Democrats	Margaret Jackson-Roberts	355	10.0	−22.0
Conservative	Will Timmins	346	9.7	−2.3
Liberal Democrats	Catherine Jones	344	9.6	−19.1
Turnout		10,221	40.6	
Labour hold		Swing		
Labour hold		Swing		
Labour gain from Liberal Democrats		Swing		

=== 2010 election ===
The election on 6 May 2010 took place on the same day as the United Kingdom general election.

2010 Camden London Borough Council election: Cantelowes
Party	Candidate	Votes	%	±%
Labour	Angela Mason	2,109	40.1	+8..3
Labour	Phil Jones	2,049	39.0	+8.3
Liberal Democrats	Paul Braithwaite	1,972	37.5	−3.5
Labour	Warwick Sharp	1,734	33.0	+2.6
Liberal Democrats	Sarah Hoyle	1,681	32.0	−6.8
Liberal Democrats	Rocky Lorusso	1,507	28.7	−9.2
Green	Sheila Hayman	752	14.3	−2.8
Conservative	Rohit Grover	712	13.5	+0.7
Conservative	Iain Martin	699	13.3	+1.8
Conservative	Carole Ricketts	631	12.0	+1.5
Green	Colin Houston	469	8.9	−6.2
Green	Rachel Zatz	326	6.2	−6.9
UKIP	Max Spencer	147	2.8	N/A
Turnout		5,257	60.8	+25.5
Labour gain from Liberal Democrats		Swing		
Labour gain from Liberal Democrats		Swing		
Liberal Democrats hold		Swing		

=== 2006 election ===
The election took place on 4 May 2006.

2006 Camden London Borough Council election: Cantelowes
Party	Candidate	Votes	%	±%
Liberal Democrats	Paul Braithwaite	1,193	41.0	+19.4
Liberal Democrats	Benjamin Rawlings	1,129	38.8	+18.7
Liberal Democrats	Frederic Carver	1,101	37.9	+21.7
Labour	John Doolan	923	31.8	−13.6
Labour	Dermot Greene	891	30.7	−15.3
Labour	Hilary Lowe	884	30.4	−11.2
Green	Elizabeth Wilson	497	17.1	−1.5
Green	Francesca Bury	440	15.1	−2.5
Green	Rachel Zatz	380	13.1	−4.9
Conservative	Judith Barnes	372	12.8	−0.4
Conservative	Richard Dollimore	334	11.5	−1.6
Conservative	Carole Ricketts	305	10.5	−2.2
Turnout		8,449	35.3	
Liberal Democrats gain from Labour		Swing		
Liberal Democrats gain from Labour		Swing		
Liberal Democrats gain from Labour		Swing		

=== 2002 election ===
The election took place on 2 May 2002.

2002 Camden London Borough Council election: Cantelowes
Party	Candidate	Votes	%	±%
Labour	Dermot Greene	861	46.0	
Labour	Gerald Harrison	850	45.4	
Labour	Judith Pattison	779	41.6	
Liberal Democrats	Soren Agerholm	404	21.6	
Liberal Democrats	Gerald Wall	377	20.1	
Green	Gaie Houston	348	18.6	
Green	Rachel Zatz	337	18.0	
Green	Rob Whitley	329	17.6	
Liberal Democrats	Simeon Litman	303	16.2	
Conservative	Sylvia Currie	247	13.2	
Conservative	Marcus Lloyd-Davy	245	13.1	
Conservative	Oliver Milne	237	12.7	
Turnout		5,320		
Labour win (new seat)				
Labour win (new seat)				
Labour win (new seat)				
