= 2026 Holborn and St Pancras by-election =

UK parliamentary by-election

- 8 October 2026

Holborn and St Pancras constituency
- Registered: 70,204
- Turnout: 38.8% (▼15.3 pp)

Candidate	Sagal Abdi-Wali	Zack Polanski
Party	Labour	Green
Popular vote	12,292	8,928
Percentage	45.2%	32.8%
Swing	▼3.7 pp	▲22.4 pp
Candidate	Ewan Cameron	Pete Newman
Party	Conservative	Reform
Popular vote	1,922	1,612
Percentage	7.1%	5.9%
Swing	▼0.1 pp	▼0.2 pp
- Boundary of the Holborn and St Pancras constituency in Greater London
MP before election
Keir Starmer
Labour
Elected MP
Sagal Abdi-Wali
Labour

A by-election for the United Kingdom parliamentary constituency of Holborn and St Pancras in London was held on 8 October 2026, following the resignation from the House of Commons of former prime minister Sir Keir Starmer on 1 September 2026.

The by-election was won by Sagal Abdi-Wali of the Labour Party with 45% of the vote.

== Background ==
The seat is in Inner London, in the London Borough of Camden, and includes Camden Town. Keir Starmer was first elected for Holborn and St Pancras in the 2015 general election. He became leader of the Labour Party in 2020, and led the party to a landslide victory at the 2024 general election. Starmer resigned as prime minister in 2026 and was replaced by the former mayor of Greater Manchester, Andy Burnham. On 1 September 2026, Starmer announced to the Camden New Journal his intention to stand down as a member of parliament. The same day, he was formally appointed as Steward of the Chiltern Hundreds in order to vacate the seat.

The Guardian reported that the seat was likely to be targeted by the Green Party, that finished third there at the 2024 general election with 10.4 per cent of the vote, behind independent candidate Andrew Feinstein in second place. The party's leader, Zack Polanski, had stated while Starmer was still PM that he was "tempted" to challenge him in the seat.

In the 2026 Camden London Borough Council election, the Labour Party won the most votes (32.8%), with the Green Party in second place (27.1%), though the Greens stood down in two wards for the Camden People's Alliance, a local left-wing party founded by Feinstein.

== Candidates ==
The Statement of Persons Nominated was published on 15 September. A total of 15 candidates stood in the by-election.

=== Green Party ===
On 3 September, following speculation, Green Party leader Zack Polanski announced his intention to stand in the by-election. Polanski said that he will remain as the party leader regardless of the outcome of the by-election. On 7 September, Hamza Chowdhury, a Camden councillor for Holborn and Covent Garden ward, announced he would put himself forward for selection to be the party's candidate. He was nominated by 6 of the 10 other Green councillors in Camden, who did so to give party members a choice as opposed to favouring Chowdhury over Polanski. Following a formal selection meeting on 10 September, it was announced on 11 September that Polanski had been voted to be the party's candidate by members of the Camden Green Party.

=== Labour Party ===
Applications for the Labour Party candidacy were due by 4 September, and the party received 96 applications. On 7 September, the party announced a shortlist of three candidates, all Labour councillors on Camden Borough Council: Sagal Abdi-Wali (who is also the leader of the council), Camron Aref-Adib, and Nasrine Djemai. Abdi-Wali, an ally of Keir Starmer, was selected as the candidate at a hustings meeting on 9 September. The Middle East Eye has reported that Abdi-Wali "is unpopular among local pro-Palestine activists because Camden council has resisted calls to divest from companies allegedly complicit in Israel's Gaza genocide".

=== Other candidates ===
On 14 September, the Conservative Party announced Ewan Cameron, who was a Camden councillor for Belsize ward from 1998 to 2002, as its candidate.

On 14 September, the Liberal Democrats announced Patrick Stillman, a Camden councillor for West Hampstead ward, as their candidate.

On 14 September, Reform UK announced Pete Newman, a former Metropolitan Police detective, as their candidate.

On 14 September, Workers Party of Britain leader George Galloway stated on his podcast The Mother of All Talk Shows that he would stand "unless the Greens make an offer we can't refuse". At the time of announcement, Galloway was still living in "self-imposed exile" in Moscow, Russia, following his detention by counter-terrorism police in late 2025. He confirmed later that day that he would stand as the Workers Party candidate. Galloway has previously served as an MP seven times for five different constituencies, most recently for Rochdale for three months in 2024 following a by-election. Chris Williamson, a former MP, resigned as deputy leader of the Workers Party in protest at Galloway's decision to stand, and called for him to support Polanski's candidacy. James Giles, who was Galloway's Chief of Staff when he was the MP for Rochdale, also endorsed Polanski. By 22 September, Galloway relocated from Moscow to South Africa to start a political tour; he claimed he will return to the UK when the Home Office confirms that he will not be detained upon arrival.

Restore Britain announced Tyler Johnson, a London-based lawyer, as its candidate. He is legal counsel for CNOOC International, whose parent firm, China National Offshore Oil Corporation, was prohibited from receiving any US investment in 2021. On Johnson's nomination forms, the proposer was Patrick McGinnis, leader of the National Housing Party UK and candidate for that party in a 2022 Camden Council by-election, who has said "Jewish ideas are destroying our country".

Rejoin EU announced Briony Kapoor, who previously served two terms as an independent town councillor in Folkestone and Hythe, as its candidate.

The Official Monster Raving Loony Party selected Barmy Brunch, who previously stood in the 2024 general election in the North East Somerset and Hanham constituency, as its candidate.

Ketankumar Pipaliya, leader of UK Voice, stood in the by-election, having previously been a candidate in the last United Kingdom by-election, the 2026 Clacton by-election. Another by-election candidate, Tom Darwood, also stood in the Clacton by-election, under the pseudonym Joseph 77.

=== Declined to stand ===
Former foreign secretary David Miliband was suggested as a possible Labour candidate, but declined to contest the seat. Novelty candidate Count Binface announced on social media that he had declined to stand.

Andrew Feinstein, who came second to Starmer standing as an independent in 2024, said in an interview with Novara Media in July 2026 that he "didn't want it to be [him]" replacing Starmer, but said whoever did replace Starmer should be "the antithesis of Starmer in every possible way". When the by-election was announced, Feinstein declined to stand, stating that he was "not in a position" to contest the seat again. He endorsed Polanski in the 2026 by-election.

== Campaign ==
Campaigners for the Labour Party standing outside a polling station in Regent's Park ward during the 2026 Holborn & St Pancras by-election

The by-election was the first of Andy Burnham's premiership, with some Labour figures describing it as a test of how much he has "nullified the threat from the Green Party" in the event of calling an early general election.

On 2 September, Zia Yusuf, Reform UK's spokesperson for home affairs, criticised the possible choice of Sagal Abdi-Wali as the Labour candidate (prior to her selection) as she was born in Somalia. His comments were criticised as racist by political figures from multiple parties, and criticised by Reform UK figure Nadine Dorries as "nasty". Reform MP Robert Jenrick defended Yusuf's comments, saying they were not racist and suggesting that it was legitimate to question the loyalties of foreign-born candidates.

The London Standard reported on 5 September that the Green Party had "knocked on nearly 1,500 doors in the first three days" since Keir Starmer's resignation, despite having not yet selected a candidate at the time.

Andrew Feinstein endorsed Polanski in the by-election. The Camden People's Alliance also endorsed Polanski after he signed up to the group's key pledges, including support for social housing, opposition to austerity, anti-racism, backing trade unions, and campaigning against the Gaza genocide.

Polanski released campaign videos in Urdu and French, which were criticised by Conservative MP Katie Lam, who said "When candidates campaign in a foreign language ... [i]t makes it impossible to hold our would-be representatives to account. We must ban this practice". Defending the videos, the Greens argued that "democracy does not discriminate by language spoken". On 19 September, Polanski released another campaign video, this time in Bengali.

On 19 September, an altercation took place in the constituency between Restore Britain campaigners, including Patrick McGinnis, and Stand Up to Racism campaigners. A Stand Up to Racism campaigner punched a Restore Britain campaigner who was canvassing. She was then arrested.

On 22 September, the Camden Muslim Network organised a campaign hustings at an art gallery in the constituency. The only candidates to attend were Polanski and Patrick Stillman of the Liberal Democrats. Organisers of the event told Middle East Eye that the Labour Party's campaign team had said that Abdi-Wali could not attend because of another commitment. Middle East Eye attempted to contact Abdi-Wali to ask why she did not attend, but did not receive a reply.

The London Standard reported on 5 October that Emma Dent Coad, a former Labour MP, had endorsed Polanski. It reported that she stated "that residents should be looking for somebody to stand up for them on housing policy".

== Opinion polls ==
Date(s) conducted	Pollster	Client	Sample size	Lab	Grn	Con	Ref	LD	WPB	Others	Lead			
Date(s) conducted	Pollster	8 Oct 2026	Sample size	2026 by-election			45.2%	32.8%	7.1%	5.9%	3.4%	1.1%	4.43% Restore 2.5% Rejoin EU 0.8% OMRLP 0.3% CPA 0.2% Climate 0.2% UKIP 0.2% UK Voice 0.2% Communist 0.03%	12.4
20 Sep – 8 Oct 2026 (Note: Most of the fieldwork was conducted between 1st and 8th October.)	Convergent Opinion (Note: Figures are weighted to include the real result of the by-election.)	Persuasion UK	405	45%	32%	8%	7%	4%	–	4%	13			
29 Sep – 6 Oct 2026	Survation	Dale Vince	504	40%	33%	8%	9%	5%	2%	3%	7			
4 Jul 2024	2024 general election			48.9%	10.4%	7.2%	6.1%	5.8%	N/A	21.4% Andrew Feinstein (Ind) 18.9% Independents 1.7% OMRLP 0.4% UKIP 0.2% Socialist Equality 0.2%	30.0 (Note: Lead over second placed candidate Andrew Feinstein (Independent), who had 18.9% of the vote.)			

== Result ==
A sign showing the way in to the Camden Town Library polling station, Regent's Park ward, during the election

2026 Holborn and St Pancras by-election
Party	Candidate	Votes	%	±%
Labour	Sagal Abdi-Wali	12,292	45.2	−3.7
Green	Zack Polanski	8,928	32.8	+22.4
Conservative	Ewan Cameron	1,922	7.1	−0.1
Reform	Peter Newman	1,612	5.9	−0.2
Liberal Democrats	Patrick Stillman	924	3.4	−2.4
Restore	Tyler Johnson	692	2.5	N/A
Workers Party	George Galloway	314	1.1	N/A
Rejoin EU	Briony Kapoor	236	0.8	N/A
Monster Raving Loony	Barmy Brunch	87	0.3	−0.1
CPA	Helen Spiby-Vann	63	0.2	N/A
Climate	Clare Fischer	51	0.2	N/A
UKIP	Ben Walker	51	0.2	±0.0
UK Voice	Ketankumar Pipaliya	23	0.1	N/A
Communist League	Jonathan Silberman	9	0.03	N/A
No description (Note: Darwood had no description on the statement of persons nominated. Some sources have referred to him as an independent.)	Tom Darwood	7	0.03	N/A
Majority		3,364	12.4	−17.6
Turnout		27,211	38.8	−15.3
Rejected ballots		108	0.4	
Registered electors		70,449		
Labour hold		Swing	-13.1	

== Previous result ==
General election 2024: Holborn and St Pancras
Party	Candidate	Votes	%	±%
Labour	Keir Starmer	18,884	48.9	−17.4
Independent	Andrew Feinstein	7,312	18.9	N/A
Green	David Stansell	4,030	10.4	+6.4
Conservative	Mehreen Malik	2,776	7.2	−8.0
Reform	David Roberts	2,371	6.1	+4.2
Liberal Democrats	Charlie Clinton	2,236	5.8	−6.5
Independent	Wais Islam	636	1.6	N/A
Monster Raving Loony	Nick the Incredible Flying Brick	162	0.4	N/A
UKIP	John Poynton	75	0.2	−0.1
Socialist Equality	Tom Scripps	61	0.2	+0.1
Independent	Senthil Kumar	40	0.1	N/A
No description	Bobby Smith	19	0.0	N/A
Majority		11,572	30.0	−21.1
Turnout		38,602	54.1	−5.0
Registered electors		71,300		
Labour hold		Swing		

== See also ==
- List of United Kingdom by-elections (2010–present)
