= Camden Square (ward) =

Electoral ward in the London Borough of Camden

- Electoral ward for the Camden London Borough Council
- Camden Square ward boundaries since 2022
- Borough: Camden
- County: Greater London
- Population: 7,557 (2021) (Note: 2021 Census data reported for 2022 ward boundaries)
- Electorate: 5,559 (2022)
- Area: 0.4948 square kilometres (0.1910 sq mi) (2022)

Current electoral ward
- Created: 2022
- Number of members: 2
- Councillors: Sagal Abdi-Wali; Tricia Leman
- Created from: Cantelowes; St Pancras and Somers Town
- GSS code: E05013654

Camden Square is an electoral ward in the London Borough of Camden. The ward was created in 2022 and was first used in the 2022 elections. It returns two councillors to Camden London Borough Council. It covers an area around Camden Square that was previously part of Cantelowes and St Pancras and Somers Town wards.

== List of councillors ==
Seat	Councillor	Took office	Left office	Party	Election
1	Danny Beales	2022	2024	Labour	2022
2	Sagal Abdi-Wali	2022	Incumbent	Labour	2022, 2026
1	Tricia Leman	2024	Incumbent	Labour	2024, 2026

== Camden council elections ==
The ward was created in 2022 from parts of Cantelowes and St Pancras and Somers Town wards.

=== 2026 election ===
The election took place 7 May 2026.

2026 Camden London Borough Council election: Camden Square
Party	Candidate	Votes	%	±%
Labour	Sagal Abdi-Wali	890	42.3	
Labour	Tricia Leman	848	40.3	
Green	Helen Doyle	830	39.4	
Green	Adam Haswell	687	32.6	
Liberal Democrats	Benjamin Newman	164	7.8	
Independent	Michael Britton	162	7.7	
Reform	Oliver Pearce	162	7.7	
Reform	Juan Ojeda-Sanchez	151	7.2	
Conservative	Roger Freeman	119	5.7	
Liberal Democrats	Tomas Samel	106	5.0	
Conservative	Jamie Webb	93	4.4	
Turnout			36.89	+5.09
Labour hold		Swing		
Labour hold		Swing		

=== 2024 by-election ===
The by-election was held on 5 September 2024, following the resignation on 12 July 2024 of Danny Beales who had been elected to the UK Parliament in the 2024 general election.

2024 Camden Square by-election
Party	Candidate	Votes	%	±%
Labour	Tricia Leman	465	47.7	−27.8
Independent	Mohammed Farah	164	16.8	+16.8
Green	James Dicker	133	13.7	+13.7
Liberal Democrats	Alexander Matthews	89	9.1	−5.0
Independent	Jasper Warwick	75	7.7	+7.7
Conservative	Esmerelda Akpoke	48	4.9	−5.5
Turnout				
Labour hold		Swing		

=== 2022 election ===
The election took place on 5 May 2022.

2022 Camden London Borough Council election: Camden Square
Party	Candidate	Votes	%
Labour	Danny Beales	1,309	74.0
Labour	Sagal Abdi-Wali	1,275	72.1
Liberal Democrats	Anne Wright	244	13.8
Liberal Democrats	Lawrence Nicholson	218	12.3
Conservative	Catherine McQueen	180	10.2
Conservative	Jack Tinley	146	8.3
Turnout		1,769	31.8
Labour win (new seat)			
Labour win (new seat)			
