= Sagal Abdi-Wali =

British politician (born 1984)

Sagal Abdi-Wali MP
- Official portrait, 2026

Member of Parliament for Holborn and St Pancras
- Incumbent
- Assumed office 8 October 2026
- Preceded by: Keir Starmer
- Majority: 3,364 (12.4%)

Leader of Camden Council
- In office 20 May 2026 – 16 November 2026
- Deputy: Pat Callaghan; Adam Harrison
- Preceded by: Richard Olszewski
- Succeeded by: James Slater

Member of Camden Council for Camden Square
- Incumbent
- Assumed office 6 May 2022 Serving with Tricia Leman
- Preceded by: Ward established
- Majority: 60 (2.9%)

Personal details
- Born: 1984 (age 41–42) Somalia
- Party: Labour
- Education: University of Leeds (BA)
- Website: sagalabdi-wali.co.uk

Sagal Abdi-Wali (born 1984) is a British Labour Party politician who has served as the member of Parliament (MP) for Holborn and St Pancras since 2026. She has also served as leader of Camden London Borough Council from May to November 2026 and as a councillor for Camden Square since 2022. She is the first Black woman to lead Camden Council and the first British Somali woman to become an MP.

Born in Somalia, Abdi-Wali came to the United Kingdom as a child refugee during the Somali Civil War and grew up in Gospel Oak, Camden. She was elected to Camden Council in 2022, became Cabinet Member for Better Homes in 2024 and was elected council leader in 2026. In the 2026 Holborn and St Pancras by-election, held following Starmer's resignation from Parliament, she defeated Green Party leader Zack Polanski with 45.2% of the vote.

== Early life and career ==
Abdi-Wali was born in Somalia in 1984. She came to the United Kingdom at the age of seven with her mother and four brothers after the family fled the Somali Civil War; her father joined them later. After a brief period in Walthamstow, the family settled in Gospel Oak. Her mother, who had trained as a lawyer in Somalia, later set up the British Somali Centre in Camden.

Abdi-Wali attended Parliament Hill School, where she later became a governor. She studied political science at the University of Leeds.

She worked for Camden Council as a housing officer. She joined the Labour Party in 2015 and has said that increasing homelessness around King's Cross prompted her involvement in party politics. She later chaired the Holborn and St Pancras Constituency Labour Party for four years. She became chair of Labour's National Women's Committee in 2023.

== Political career ==
=== Camden Council ===
Abdi-Wali was elected as a councillor for the newly created Camden Square ward at the 2022 Camden London Borough Council election, receiving 1,275 votes.

In May 2024, she was appointed Cabinet Member for Better Homes. Her portfolio included council homes and estates, landlord services, repairs and maintenance, tenant and leaseholder participation and standards in the private rented sector.

Abdi-Wali was re-elected in the 2026 Camden London Borough Council election on 7 May 2026, receiving 890 votes. Following the election, in which council leader Richard Olszewski lost his seat, Labour councillors selected Abdi-Wali to succeed him. The first ballot between Abdi-Wali and Adam Harrison was tied; she won a second ballot by one vote. She was elected Leader of Camden Council on 20 May, becoming the first Black woman to hold the position.

In the run-up to the 2026 Holborn and St Pancras by-election, the Middle East Eye reported that Abdi-Wali "is unpopular among local pro-Palestine activists because Camden council has resisted calls to divest from companies allegedly complicit in Israel's Gaza genocide".

=== 2026 Holborn and St Pancras by-election ===
Following Keir Starmer's resignation from the House of Commons, Abdi-Wali was selected as Labour's candidate for the 2026 Holborn and St Pancras by-election on 9 September 2026. She had been chosen from a longlist of more than 100 candidates. Her main opponent was Zack Polanski, leader of the Green Party of England and Wales. Her campaign focused particularly on housing and homelessness. Abdi-Wali is an ally of Keir Starmer.

During the selection period, Zia Yusuf, Reform UK's spokesperson on home affairs, criticised Abdi-Wali's prospective candidacy in a social media post referring to her having been born in Somalia. The remarks were criticised by Labour politicians and senior figures in Reform UK. Abdi-Wali said they strengthened her determination to stand for Parliament.

Asked about the Gaza war during the campaign, Abdi-Wali welcomed government measures against Israeli settlements in the West Bank and said the conflict had contributed to increased hate within local communities.

The by-election was held on 8 October 2026. Abdi-Wali received 12,292 votes (45.2%), compared with Polanski's 8,928 (32.8%), giving Labour a majority of 3,364. She became the first woman to represent Holborn and St Pancras since the constituency was created in 1983.

After her election, Abdi-Wali named housing and homelessness among her priorities as an MP. She also called for Thames Water to be brought into public ownership and for greater access to jobs and apprenticeships for young people.

== Personal life ==
Abdi-Wali lives in Gospel Oak. She is a governor of Parliament Hill School, which she attended as a pupil.

Parliament of the United Kingdom
Preceded by Keir Starmer	Member of Parliament for Holborn and St Pancras; 2026–present	Incumbent
Political offices
Preceded by Richard Olszewski	Leader of Camden London Borough Council; 2026	Succeeded by James Slater
