= Climate Party =

British political party

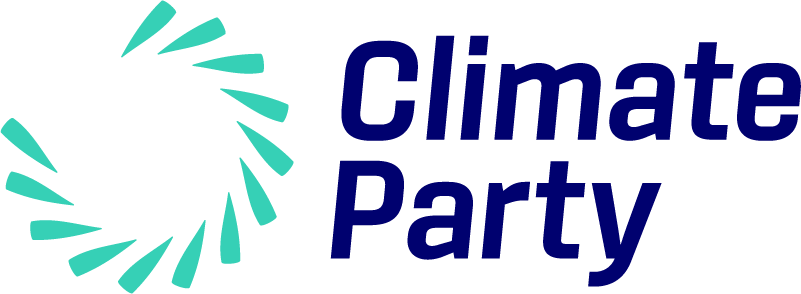
- Leader: Edmund Gemmell
- Treasurer: Andy Hill
- Founded: 5 September 2022; 4 years ago
- Ideology: Green conservatism
- Political position: Centre-right
- Colours: Teal; Blue
- House of Commons: 0 / 650
- Local government: 0 / 19,481

Website
- https://theclimate.party/

The Climate Party is a minor green conservative political party in the United Kingdom.

The party was founded in 2022 by Ed Gemmell, a councillor for Hazlemere in Buckinghamshire. Gemmell describes the party as a "business-friendly and climate-serious alternative" to the Conservative Party.

The party stood thirteen candidates in the 2024 general election, targeting Conservative-held marginal seats and MPs who 'obstruct climate action'.

== Ideology ==
The party's core focus is on tackling climate change and decarbonising the economy by 2030. It describes itself as "100% focused on climate change". Its policy proposals include abolishing all fossil fuel subsidies, implementing "polluter-pays policies" and investing in green technology. It aims to lead the UK to economic revival and increased prosperity through a commitment to net zero by 2030, while restoring nature and decreasing pollution.

== Electoral history ==
The Climate Party contested the July 2023 Uxbridge and South Ruislip and Selby and Ainsty by-elections, with Gemmell running in Uxbridge and Luke Wellock in Selby. Both candidates lost their deposits.

The Climate Party fielded thirteen candidates in 2024 general election, with leader Ed Gemmell standing in Wycombe. All Climate Party candidates lost their deposits, with only Gemmell reaching over one percent of the vote in his constituency.

=== By-elections ===
==== 2019–2024 ====
Constituency	Date	Candidate	Number of votes	% of votes	Position	Winner
Selby and Ainsty	20 July 2023	Luke Wellock	39	0.1	13th of 13	Labour
Uxbridge and South Ruislip	20 July 2023	Ed Gemmell	49	0.2	15th of 17	Conservative

==== 2024–present ====
Constituency	Date	Candidate	Number of votes	% of votes	Position	Winner
Makerfield	18 June 2026	Ed Gemmell	18	0.04	12th of 14	Labour Co-op
Holborn and St Pancras	8 October 2026	Clare Fischer	51	0.2	11th of 15	Labour

=== General elections ===
2024 general election
Constituency	Candidate	Votes	%
Banbury	Chris Nevile	242	0.5
Bangor Aberconwy	Steve Marshall	104	0.2
Bromley and Biggin Hill	Karen Miller	94	0.2
Clacton	Craig Jamieson	48	0.1
Colchester	James Rolfe	74	0.2
Doncaster East and the Isle of Axholme	Michael Longfellow	146	0.4
Exmouth and Exeter East	Mark Baldwin	134	0.3
Greenwich and Woolwich	Priyank Bakshi	173	0.4
Leeds North East	Stewart Hey	91	0.2
Mid Buckinghamshire	Wisdom Da Costa	147	0.3
Northampton South	Penelope Tollitt	98	0.2
Salisbury	Chris Harwood	127	0.3
Wycombe	Ed Gemmell	489	1.1
