= List of MPs for constituencies in England (2024–present) =

- Colours on map indicate the party allegiance of each constituency's MP on the day of the 2024 UK election

This is a list of members of Parliament (MPs) elected to the House of Commons of the United Kingdom by English constituencies for the fifty-ninth Parliament of the United Kingdom (2024–present).

It includes MPs elected at the 2024 general election, held on 4 July 2024.

The number of constituencies in England increased from 533 to 543 at this election. The Labour Party's vote went up by 0.5% and their number of MPs increased from 184 to 347. This was at the expense of the Conservatives, whose vote share dropped by 21% and their number of MPs reducing to 116.

The list is sorted by the name of the MP, and MPs who did not serve throughout the Parliament are italicised. New MPs elected since the general election are noted at the bottom of the page.

== Composition ==
Number of seats by party (at election)
1. Labour (63.9%)
2. Conservative (21.4%)
3. Lib Dems (12.0%)
4. Reform (0.92%)
5. Independent (0.92%)
6. Greens (0.74%)
7. Speaker (0.19%)

=== Election ===
Affiliation	Members
Labour Party	347
Conservative Party	116
Liberal Democrats	65
Reform UK	5
Independent	5
Green Party	4
Speaker	1
Total	543

== MPs in the East of England region ==
Affiliation	Members
Labour	26
Conservative	23
Liberal Democrats	7
Reform UK	1
Restore Britain	1
Green	1
Independent	2
Total	61

MP	Constituency	Party	In constituency since	Majority	Majority (%)
Jack Abbott	Ipswich	Labour Co-op	2024	7,403	16.8
Bayo Alaba	Southend East and Rochford	Independent (Note: Alaba was suspended from Labour in August 2026. He sits as an independent.)	2024	4,027	10.1
Steffan Aquarone	North Norfolk	Liberal Democrats	2024	2,585	5.5
Jess Asato	Lowestoft	Labour	2024	2,016	4.8
Kemi Badenoch	North West Essex	Conservative	2024 (Note: Badenoch was formerly the MP for Saffron Walden from 2017 until the constituency was abolished.)	2,610	4.8
Steve Barclay	North East Cambridgeshire	Conservative	2010	7,189	18.4
Kevin Bonavia	Stevenage	Labour	2024	6,618	15.5
Alex Burghart	Brentwood and Ongar	Conservative	2017	5,980	12.4
David Burton-Sampson	Southend West and Leigh	Labour	2024	1,949	4.1
Charlotte Cane	Ely and East Cambridgeshire	Liberal Democrats	2024	495	0.9
Sam Carling	North West Cambridgeshire	Labour	2024	39	0.09
James Cartlidge	South Suffolk	Conservative	2015	3,047	6.3
James Cleverly	Braintree	Conservative	2015	3,670	7.5
Lewis Cocking	Broxbourne	Conservative	2024	2,858	6.6
Victoria Collins	Harpenden and Berkhamsted	Liberal Democrats	2024	10,708	19.7
Daisy Cooper	St Albans	Liberal Democrats	2019	19,834	38.4
Pam Cox	Colchester	Labour	2024	8,250	18.4
Jen Craft	Thurrock	Labour	2024	6,474	17.2
Josh Dean	Hertford and Stortford	Labour	2024	4,748	8.8
Oliver Dowden	Hertsmere	Conservative	2015	7,992	16.7
Nigel Farage	Clacton	Reform	2024	12,784	36.4
Mark Francois	Rayleigh and Wickford	Conservative	2010 (Note: Francois was formerly the MP for Rayleigh from 2001 until the constituency was abolished.)	5,621	11.7
George Freeman	Mid Norfolk	Conservative	2010	3,054	6.7
Richard Fuller	North Bedfordshire	Conservative	2024 (Note: Fuller was formerly the MP for North East Bedfordshire from 2019 until the constituency was abolished, and previously served as MP for Bedford from 2010 until 2017.)	5,414	10.5
Marie Goldman	Chelmsford	Liberal Democrats	2024	4,753	9.4
Ben Goldsborough	South Norfolk	Labour	2024	2,826	5.7
Rebecca Harris	Castle Point	Conservative	2010	3,251	8.0
Pippa Heylings	South Cambridgeshire	Liberal Democrats	2024	10,641	19.4
Chris Hinchliff	North East Hertfordshire	Labour	2024	1,923	3.7
Richard Holden	Basildon and Billericay	Conservative	2024 (Note: Holden was formerly the MP for North West Durham since 2019 until the constituency was abolished.)	20	0.04
Rachel Hopkins	Luton South and South Bedfordshire	Labour	2019	6,858	17.9
Neil Hudson	Epping Forest	Conservative	2024 (Note: Hudson was formerly the MP for Penrith and The Border since 2019 until the constituency was abolished.)	5,682	13.6
Bernard Jenkin	Harwich and North Essex	Conservative	2010 (Note: Jenkin was formerly the MP for North Essex from 1997 until the constituency was abolished, and previously Colchester North from 1992 until the constituency was abolished.)	1,162	2.4
Terry Jermy	South West Norfolk	Labour	2024	630	1.4
Andrew Lewin	Welwyn Hatfield	Labour	2024	3,799	7.8
Clive Lewis	Norwich South	Labour	2015	13,239	29.3
Rupert Lowe	Great Yarmouth	Restore (Note: Lowe was elected from Reform UK, but lost its whip in March 2025 and sat as an independent until March 2026, when Restore Britain already transitioned to a new party.)	2024	1,426	3.5
Alice Macdonald	Norwich North	Labour	2024	10,850	23.7
Alex Mayer	Dunstable and Leighton Buzzard	Labour	2024	667	1.4
Jerome Mayhew	Broadland and Fakenham	Conservative	2019	719	1.5
James McMurdock	South Basildon and East Thurrock	Independent (Note: McMurdock resigned from Reform UK in July 2025. He sits as an independent.)	2024	98	0.2
Gagan Mohindra	South West Hertfordshire	Conservative	2019	4,456	9.2
Ben Obese-Jecty	Huntingdon	Conservative	2024	1,499	2.9
Sarah Owen	Luton North	Labour	2019	7,510	19.4
Andrew Pakes	Peterborough	Labour Co-op	2024	118	0.2
Priti Patel	Witham	Conservative	2010	5,145	10.2
Peter Prinsley	Bury St Edmunds and Stowmarket	Labour	2024	1,452	2.9
Adrian Ramsay	Waveney Valley	Green	2024	5,593	11.4
Jenny Riddell-Carpenter	Suffolk Coastal	Labour	2024	1,070	2.2
Ian Sollom	St Neots and Mid Cambridgeshire	Liberal Democrats	2024	4,648	8.7
Patrick Spencer	Central Suffolk and North Ipswich	Conservative	2024	4,290	9.2
Blake Stephenson	Mid Bedfordshire	Conservative	2024	1,321	3.3
Alistair Strathern	Hitchin	Labour	2024 (Note: Strathern previously served as MP for Mid Bedfordshire from 2023 to 2024.)	7,109	13.6
David Taylor	Hemel Hempstead	Labour	2024	4,857	11.0
Nick Timothy	West Suffolk	Conservative	2024	3,247	7.1
Matt Turmaine	Watford	Labour	2024	4,723	10.6
Chris Vince	Harlow	Labour Co-op	2024	2,504	5.8
John Whittingdale	Maldon	Conservative	2010 (Note: Whittingdale was formerly the MP for Maldon and East Chelmsford from 1997 until the constituency was abolished, and previously South Colchester and Maldon from 1992 until the constituency was abolished.)	6,906	13.9
James Wild	North West Norfolk	Conservative	2019	4,954	11.1
Mohammad Yasin	Bedford	Labour	2017	9,430	23.2
Daniel Zeichner	Cambridge	Labour	2015	11,078	26.3

== MPs in the East Midlands region ==
Affiliation	Members
Labour	29
Conservative	14
Reform UK	3
Independent	1
Total	47

MP	Constituency	Party	In constituency since	Majority	Majority (%)
Shockat Adam	Leicester South	Independent	2024	979	2.3
Lee Anderson	Ashfield	Reform	2019	5,509	13.8
Stuart Andrew	Daventry	Conservative	2024 (Note: Andrew was formerly the MP for Pudsey since 2010 until the constituency was abolished.)	3,012	5.7
Edward Argar	Melton and Syston	Conservative	2024 (Note: Argar was formerly the MP for Charnwood since 2015 until the constituency was abolished.)	5,396	11.7
Victoria Atkins	Louth and Horncastle	Conservative	2015	5,506	11.8
Catherine Atkinson	Derby North	Labour	2024	8,915	21.8
Lee Barron	Corby and East Northamptonshire	Labour	2024	6,331	12.8
Peter Bedford	Mid Leicestershire	Conservative	2024	2,201	4.6
Sarah Bool	South Northamptonshire	Conservative	2024	3,687	6.8
Juliet Campbell	Broxtowe	Labour	2024	8,403	17.6
Alberto Costa	South Leicestershire	Conservative	2015	5,508	10.8
Gareth Davies	Grantham and Bourne	Conservative	2024 (Note: Davies was formerly the MP for Grantham and Stamford since 2019 until the constituency was abolished.)	4,496	9.7
Jonathan Davies	Mid Derbyshire	Labour	2024	1,878	4.0
Luke Evans	Hinckley and Bosworth	Conservative	2019	5,408	11.3
Hamish Falconer	Lincoln	Labour	2024	8,793	20.8
Linsey Farnsworth	Amber Valley	Labour	2024	3,554	8.3
Natalie Fleet	Bolsover	Labour	2024	6,323	14.9
Lilian Greenwood	Nottingham South	Labour	2010	10,294	31.3
Amanda Hack	North West Leicestershire	Labour	2024	1,012	2.0
John Hayes	South Holland and The Deepings	Conservative	1997	6,856	14.9
Robert Jenrick	Newark	Reform (Note: Jenrick was re-elected as a Conservative, but defected to Reform UK in January 2026 after losing the Conservative whip.)	2014	3,572	6.7
Caroline Johnson	Sleaford and North Hykeham	Conservative	2016	4,346	8.9
Alicia Kearns	Rutland and Stamford	Conservative	2024 (Note: Kearns was formerly the MP for Rutland and Melton since 2019 until the constituency was abolished.)	10,394	21.4
Liz Kendall	Leicester West	Labour	2010	8,777	24.8
Gen Kitchen	Wellingborough and Rushden	Labour	2024	5,486	12.5
Edward Leigh	Gainsborough	Conservative	1997 (Note: Leigh was formerly the MP for Gainsborough and Horncastle since 1983 until the constituency was abolished.)	3,532	7.6
James Naish	Rushcliffe	Labour	2024	7,426	12.8
Samantha Niblett	South Derbyshire	Labour	2024	4,168	9.1
Alex Norris	Nottingham North and Kimberley	Labour Co-op	2024 (Note: Norris was formerly the MP for Nottingham North since 2017 until the constituency was abolished.)	9,427	26.9
Neil O'Brien	Harborough, Oadby and Wigston	Conservative	2017	2,378	4.7
Michael Payne	Gedling	Labour	2024	11,881	24.4
Jon Pearce	High Peak	Labour	2024	7,908	16.1
Toby Perkins	Chesterfield	Labour	2010	10,820	26.1
Shivani Raja	Leicester East	Conservative	2024	4,426	9.5
Mike Reader	Northampton South	Labour	2024	4,071	9.3
Lucy Rigby	Northampton North	Labour	2024	9,014	21.5
Jeevun Sandher	Loughborough	Labour	2024	4,960	11.7
Louise Sandher-Jones	North East Derbyshire	Labour	2024	1,753	3.9
Baggy Shanker	Derby South	Labour Co-op	2024	6,002	16.1
Adam Thompson	Erewash	Labour	2024	5,859	13.6
Richard Tice	Boston and Skegness	Reform	2024	2,010	5.0
Michelle Welsh	Sherwood Forest	Labour	2024	5,443	11.2
John Whitby	Derbyshire Dales	Labour	2024	350	0.6
Jo White	Bassetlaw	Labour	2024	5,768	12.9
Nadia Whittome	Nottingham East	Labour	2019	15,162	42.0
Rosie Wrighting	Kettering	Labour	2024	3,900	7.8
Steve Yemm	Mansfield	Labour	2024	3,485	8.5

== MPs in the London region ==
Affiliation	Members
Labour	59
Conservative	8
Liberal Democrats	6
Reform UK	1
Your Party	1
Total	75

MP	Constituency	Party	In constituency since	Majority	Majority (%)
Diane Abbott	Hackney North and Stoke Newington	Labour	1987	15,080	36.8
Sagal Abdi-Wali	Holborn and St Pancras	Labour	2026 by-election	71,300	12.4
Rushanara Ali	Bethnal Green and Stepney	Labour	2024 (Note: Ali was formerly the MP for Bethnal Green and Bow since 2010 until the constituency was abolished.)	1,689	3.6
Rosena Allin-Khan	Tooting	Labour	2016	19,487	36.8
Fleur Anderson	Putney	Labour	2019	10,941	25.6
James Asser	West Ham and Beckton	Labour	2024	9,254	25.7
Jas Athwal	Ilford South	Labour	2024	6,896	16.8
Gareth Bacon	Orpington	Conservative	2019	5,118	11.1
Calvin Bailey	Leyton and Wanstead	Labour	2024	13,964	32.0
Danny Beales	Uxbridge and South Ruislip	Labour	2024	587	1.3
Apsana Begum	Poplar and Limehouse	Labour	2019	12,560	29.2
Bob Blackman	Harrow East	Conservative	2010	11,680	24.4
Rachel Blake	Cities of London and Westminster	Labour	2024	2,708	6.9
Dawn Butler	Brent East	Labour	2024 (Note: Butler was formerly the MP for Brent Central since 2015 until the constituency was abolished.)	13,047	34.5
Ruth Cadbury	Brentford and Isleworth	Labour	2015	9,824	21.7
Nesil Caliskan	Barking	Labour	2024	11,054	30.3
Bambos Charalambous	Southgate and Wood Green	Labour	2024 (Note: Charalambous was formerly the MP for Enfield Southgate since 2017 until the constituency was abolished.)	15,300	33.5
Feryal Clark	Enfield North	Labour	2019	12,736	29.3
Ben Coleman	Chelsea and Fulham	Labour	2024	152	0.3
Liam Conlon	Beckenham and Penge	Labour	2024	12,905	24.7
Jeremy Corbyn	Islington North	Your Party (Note: Corbyn was re-elected as an independent in 2024 and was listed as Your Party's second MP in June 2026.)	1983	7,247	14.8
Deirdre Costigan	Ealing Southall	Labour	2024	15,793	33.7
Neil Coyle	Bermondsey and Old Southwark	Labour	2015	7,787	20.7
Stella Creasy	Walthamstow	Labour Co-op	2010	17,996	39.3
Janet Daby	Lewisham East	Labour	2018	18,073	44.5
Ed Davey	Kingston and Surbiton	Liberal Democrats	2017 (Note: Davey previously served the constituency as MP from 1997 to 2015.)	17,235	34.1
Marsha de Cordova	Battersea	Labour	2017	12,039	25.6
Bobby Dean	Carshalton and Wallington	Liberal Democrats	2024	7,905	16.9
Iain Duncan Smith	Chingford and Woodford Green	Conservative	1997 (Note: Duncan Smith was formerly the MP for Chingford since 1992 until the constituency was abolished.)	4,758	9.8
Clive Efford	Eltham and Chislehurst	Labour	2024 (Note: Efford was formerly the MP for Eltham since 1997 until the constituency was abolished.)	8,429	14.5
Florence Eshalomi	Vauxhall and Camberwell Green	Labour Co-op	2024 (Note: Eshalomi was formerly the MP for Vauxhall since 2019 until the constituency was abolished.)	15,112	40.3
Miatta Fahnbulleh	Peckham	Labour Co-op	2024	15,228	39.3
Peter Fortune	Bromley and Biggin Hill	Conservative	2024	302	0.6
Vicky Foxcroft	Lewisham North	Labour	2024 (Note: Foxcroft was formerly the MP for Lewisham Deptford since 2015 until the constituency was abolished.)	15,782	35.8
Daniel Francis	Bexleyheath and Crayford	Labour	2024	2,114	4.9
Louie French	Old Bexley and Sidcup	Conservative	2021	3,548	7.4
Barry Gardiner	Brent West	Labour	2024 (Note: Gardiner was formerly the MP for Brent North since 1997 until the constituency was abolished.)	3,793	9.2
Georgia Gould	Queen's Park and Maida Vale	Labour	2024	14,913	38.9
Helen Hayes	Dulwich and West Norwood	Labour	2015	18,789	41.4
Meg Hillier	Hackney South and Shoreditch	Labour Co-op	2005	14,737	35.3
Rupa Huq	Ealing Central and Acton	Labour	2015	13,995	29.3
Natasha Irons	Croydon East	Labour	2024	6,825	15.6
Sarah Jones	Croydon West	Labour	2024 (Note: Jones was formerly the MP for Croydon Central since 2017 until the constituency was abolished.)	14,226	37.3
Paul Kohler	Wimbledon	Liberal Democrats	2024	12,610	22.9
Uma Kumaran	Stratford and Bow	Labour	2024	11,634	26.8
David Lammy	Tottenham	Labour	2000	15,434	38.4
Julia Lopez	Hornchurch and Upminster	Conservative	2017	1,943	4.1
Seema Malhotra	Feltham and Heston	Labour Co-op	2011	7,944	20.4
Siobhain McDonagh	Mitcham and Morden	Labour	1997	18,761	41.4
John McDonnell	Hayes and Harlington	Labour	1997	12,031	31.4
Margaret Mullane	Dagenham and Rainham	Labour	2024	7,173	18.4
James Murray	Ealing North	Labour Co-op	2019	12,489	28.9
Sarah Olney	Richmond Park	Liberal Democrats	2019 (Note: Olney previously served the constituency as MP from 2016 to 2017.)	17,155	33.3
Abena Oppong-Asare	Erith and Thamesmead	Labour	2019	16,032	39.7
Kate Osamor	Edmonton and Winchmore Hill	Labour Co-op	2024 (Note: Osamor was formerly the MP for Edmonton since 2015 until the constituency was abolished.)	12,632	30.8
Matthew Pennycook	Greenwich and Woolwich	Labour	2015	18,366	43.0
Chris Philp	Croydon South	Conservative	2015	2,313	4.7
David Pinto-Duschinsky	Hendon	Labour	2024	15	0.04
Joe Powell	Kensington and Bayswater	Labour	2024	2,903	6.9
Steve Reed	Streatham and Croydon North	Labour Co-op	2024 (Note: Reed was formerly the MP for Croydon North since a by-election in November 2012 until the constituency was abolished.)	15,603	35.0
Ellie Reeves	Lewisham West and East Dulwich	Labour	2024 (Note: Reeves was formerly the MP for Lewisham West and Penge since 2017 until the constituency was abolished.)	18,397	39.7
Bell Ribeiro-Addy	Clapham and Brixton Hill	Labour	2024 (Note: Ribeiro-Addy was formerly the MP for Streatham since 2019 until the constituency was abolished.)	18,005	42.1
Andrew Rosindell	Romford	Reform (Note: Rosindell was re-elected as a Conservative, but defected to Reform UK in January 2026.)	2001	1,463	3.3
Sarah Sackman	Finchley and Golders Green	Labour	2024	4,581	9.2
Tulip Siddiq	Hampstead and Highgate	Labour	2024 (Note: Siddiq was formerly the MP for Hampstead and Kilburn since 2015 until the constituency was abolished.)	13,970	28.8
David Simmonds	Ruislip, Northwood and Pinner	Conservative	2019	7,581	16.1
Andy Slaughter	Hammersmith and Chiswick	Labour	2024 (Note: Slaughter was formerly the MP for Hammersmith since 2010 until the constituency was abolished, and previously Ealing, Acton and Shepherd's Bush from 2005 until the constituency was abolished.)	15,290	33.2
Keir Starmer	Holborn and St Pancras	Labour	2015	11,572	30.0
Wes Streeting	Ilford North	Labour	2015	528	1.2
Luke Taylor	Sutton and Cheam	Liberal Democrats	2024	3,801	8.0
Gareth Thomas	Harrow West	Labour Co-op	1997	6,642	14.6
Emily Thornberry	Islington South and Finsbury	Labour	2005	15,455	36.1
Stephen Timms	East Ham	Labour	1997 (Note: Timms was formerly the MP for Newham North East since a by-election in June 1994 until the constituency was abolished.)	12,863	33.9
Dan Tomlinson	Chipping Barnet	Labour	2024	2,914	5.7
Catherine West	Hornsey and Friern Barnet	Labour	2024 (Note: West was formerly the MP for Hornsey and Wood Green since 2015 until the constituency was abolished.)	21,475	43.9
Munira Wilson	Twickenham	Liberal Democrats	2019	21,457	40.0

== MPs in the North East region ==
Affiliation	Members
Labour	26
Conservative	1
Total	27

MP	Constituency	Party	In constituency since	Majority	Majority (%)
Luke Akehurst	North Durham	Labour	2024	5,873	14.1
Lewis Atkinson	Sunderland Central	Labour	2024	6,073	15.2
Jonathan Brash	Hartlepool	Labour	2024	7,698	21.7
Alan Campbell	Tynemouth	Labour	1997	15,455	31.9
Mark Ferguson	Gateshead Central and Whickham	Labour	2024	9,644	24.0
Emma Foody	Cramlington and Killingworth	Labour Co-op	2024	12,820	28.3
Mary Kelly Foy	City of Durham	Labour	2019	11,757	28.9
Mary Glindon	Newcastle upon Tyne East and Wallsend	Labour	2024 (Note: Glindon was formerly the MP for North Tyneside since 2010 until the constituency was abolished.)	12,817	30.3
Sharon Hodgson	Washington and Gateshead South	Labour	2024 (Note: Hodgson was formerly the MP for Washington and Sunderland West from 2010 until the constituency was abolished, and previously Gateshead East and Washington West from 2005 until the constituency was abolished.)	6,913	18.7
Ian Lavery	Blyth and Ashington	Labour	2024 (Note: Lavery was formerly the MP for Wansbeck since 2010 until the constituency was abolished.)	9,173	22.7
Emma Lewell-Buck	South Shields	Labour	2013	6,653	18.1
Andy McDonald	Middlesbrough and Thornaby East	Labour	2024 (Note: McDonald was formerly the MP for Middlesbrough since a by-election in November 2012 until the constituency was abolished.)	9,192	26.7
Chris McDonald	Stockton North	Labour	2024	7,939	21.2
Lola McEvoy	Darlington	Labour	2024	2,298	5.4
Catherine McKinnell	Newcastle upon Tyne North	Labour	2010	17,762	36.6
Grahame Morris	Easington	Labour	2010	6,542	19.1
Joe Morris	Hexham	Labour	2024	3,713	7.2
Luke Myer	Middlesbrough South and East Cleveland	Labour	2024	214	0.6
Chi Onwurah	Newcastle upon Tyne Central and West	Labour	2024 (Note: Onwurah was formerly the MP for Newcastle upon Tyne Central since 2010 until the constituency was abolished.)	11,060	26.7
Kate Osborne	Jarrow and Gateshead East	Labour	2024 (Note: Osborne was formerly the MP for Jarrow since 2019 until the constituency was abolished.)	8,946	24.4
Bridget Phillipson	Houghton and Sunderland South	Labour	2010	7,168	18.0
Sam Rushworth	Bishop Auckland	Labour	2024	6,672	16.5
David Smith	North Northumberland	Labour	2024	5,067	10.4
Alan Strickland	Newton Aycliffe and Spennymoor	Labour	2024	8,839	22.2
Anna Turley	Redcar	Labour Co-op	2024 (Note: Turley previously served the constituency as MP from 2015 to 2019.)	3,323	8.7
Liz Twist	Blaydon and Consett	Labour	2024 (Note: Twist was formerly the MP for Blaydon since 2017 until the constituency was abolished.)	11,153	26.4
Matt Vickers	Stockton West	Conservative	2024 (Note: Vickers was formerly the MP for Stockton South since 2019 until the constituency was abolished.)	2,139	4.4

== MPs in the North West region ==
Affiliation	Members
Labour	65
Conservative	3
Liberal Democrats	3
Green	1
Reform UK	1
Speaker	1
Independent	3
Total	77

MP	Constituency	Party	In constituency since	Majority	Majority (%)
Debbie Abrahams	Oldham East and Saddleworth	Labour	2011	6,357	15.9
Mike Amesbury	Runcorn and Helsby	Independent (Note: Amesbury was suspended from Labour in October 2024. He resigned from the party in January 2025 and from Parliament in March. He sat as an independent.)	2024 (Note: Amesbury was formerly the MP for Weaver Vale since 2017 until the constituency was abolished.)	14,696	34.8
David Baines	St Helens North	Labour	2024	12,169	30.1
Paula Barker	Liverpool Wavertree	Labour	2019	16,304	41.0
Lorraine Beavers	Blackpool North and Fleetwood	Labour	2024	4,647	11.1
Elsie Blundell	Heywood and Middleton North	Labour	2024	6,082	16.4
Aphra Brandreth	Chester South and Eddisbury	Conservative	2024	3,057	5.8
Phil Brickell	Bolton West	Labour	2024	4,945	11.1
Andy Burnham	Makerfield	Labour Co-op	2026 by-election (Note: Burnham was formerly the MP for Leigh from 2001 until 2017.)	9,231	20.3
Ian Byrne	Liverpool West Derby	Labour	2019	20,423	53.8
Markus Campbell-Savours	Penrith and Solway	Labour	2024	5,257	19.7
Dan Carden	Liverpool Walton	Labour	2017	20,245	54.9
Lizzi Collinge	Morecambe and Lunesdale	Labour	2024	5,815	12.1
Andrew Cooper	Mid Cheshire	Labour	2024	8,927	21.5
Ashley Dalton	West Lancashire	Labour	2023	13,625	30.8
Samantha Dixon	Chester North and Neston	Labour	2024 (Note: Dixon was formerly the MP for City of Chester since a by-election in December 2022 until the constituency was abolished.)	11,870	26.6
Peter Dowd	Bootle	Labour	2015	21,983	56.5
Angela Eagle	Wallasey	Labour	1992	17,996	42.1
Maria Eagle	Liverpool Garston	Labour	2024 (Note: Eagle was formerly the MP for Garston and Halewood since 2010 until the constituency was abolished.)	20,104	47.9
Maya Ellis	Ribble Valley	Labour	2024	856	1.6
Kirith Entwistle	Bolton North East	Labour	2024	6,653	15.3
Bill Esterson	Sefton Central	Labour	2010	18,282	38.5
Tim Farron	Westmorland and Lonsdale	Liberal Democrats	2005	21,472	43.3
Paul Foster	South Ribble	Labour	2024	6,501	13.9
James Frith	Bury North	Labour	2024 (Note: Frith previously served the constituency as MP from 2017 to 2019.)	6,944	15.2
Andrew Gwynne	Gorton and Denton	Independent (Note: Gwynne was suspended from Labour in February 2025 and resigned from Parliament in January 2026. He sat as an independent.)	2024 (Note: Gwynne was formerly the MP for Denton and Reddish since 2005 until the constituency was abolished.)	13,413	36.7
Sarah Hall	Warrington South	Labour Co-op	2024	11,340	22.8
Mark Hendrick	Preston	Labour Co-op	2000	5,291	13.2
Jonathan Hinder	Pendle and Clitheroe	Labour	2024	902	1.9
Lindsay Hoyle	Chorley	Speaker	1997	20,575	60.6
Patrick Hurley	Southport	Labour	2024	5,789	12.9
Adnan Hussain	Blackburn	Independent	2024	132	0.3
Kim Johnson	Liverpool Riverside	Labour	2019	14,793	45.7
Mike Kane	Wythenshawe and Sale East	Labour	2014	14,610	37.3
Afzal Khan	Manchester Rusholme	Labour	2024 (Note: Khan was formerly the MP for Manchester Gorton since 2017 until the constituency was abolished.)	8,235	28.4
Rebecca Long-Bailey	Salford	Labour	2024 (Note: Long-Bailey was formerly the MP for Salford and Eccles since 2015 until the constituency was abolished.)	15,101	38.0
Josh MacAlister	Whitehaven and Workington	Labour	2024	13,286	31.7
Andy MacNae	Rossendale and Darwen	Labour	2024	5,628	13.0
Justin Madders	Ellesmere Port and Bromborough	Labour	2024 (Note: Madders was formerly the MP for Ellesmere Port and Neston since 2015 until the constituency was abolished.)	16,908	40.3
Alison McGovern	Birkenhead	Labour	2024 (Note: McGovern was formerly the MP for Wirral South since 2010 until the constituency was abolished.)	13,798	32.0
Jim McMahon	Oldham West, Chadderton and Royton	Labour Co-op	2015	4,976	12.9
Esther McVey	Tatton	Conservative	2017	1,136	2.2
Anneliese Midgley	Knowsley	Labour	2024	18,319	50.9
Julie Minns	Carlisle	Labour	2024	5,200	11.3
Navendu Mishra	Stockport	Labour	2019	15,270	35.0
Tom Morrison	Cheadle	Liberal Democrats	2024	12,235	24.1
Connor Naismith	Crewe and Nantwich	Labour	2024	9,727	20.6
Lisa Nandy	Wigan	Labour	2010	9,549	23.3
Charlotte Nichols	Warrington North	Labour	2019	9,190	23.0
Matthew Patrick	Wirral West	Labour	2024	9,998	20.0
Jo Platt	Leigh and Atherton	Labour Co-op	2024 (Note: Platt previously served as MP for Leigh from 2017 to 2019.)	8,881	21.6
Sarah Pochin	Runcorn and Helsby	Reform	2025 by-election	6	0.02
Lucy Powell	Manchester Central	Labour Co-op	2012	13,797	34.7
Yasmin Qureshi	Bolton South and Walkden	Labour	2024 (Note: Qureshi was formerly the MP for Bolton South East since 2010 until the constituency was abolished.)	6,743	18.3
Connor Rand	Altrincham and Sale West	Labour	2024	4,174	8.1
Angela Rayner	Ashton-under-Lyne	Labour	2015	6,791	19.1
Jonathan Reynolds	Stalybridge and Hyde	Labour Co-op	2010	8,539	22.9
Marie Rimmer	St Helens South and Whiston	Labour	2015	11,945	31.4
Tim Roca	Macclesfield	Labour	2024	9,120	17.3
Sarah Russell	Congleton	Labour	2024	3,387	6.8
Oliver Ryan	Burnley	Labour Co-op	2024	3,420	8.6
Michelle Scrogham	Barrow and Furness	Labour	2024	5,324	12.6
Josh Simons	Makerfield	Labour	2024	5,399	13.4
Lisa Smart	Hazel Grove	Liberal Democrats	2024	6,500	14.1
Cat Smith	Lancaster and Wyre	Labour	2024 (Note: Smith was formerly the MP for Lancaster and Fleetwood since 2010 until the constituency was abolished.)	9,253	21.5
Jeff Smith	Manchester Withington	Labour	2015	13,982	33.5
Sarah Smith	Hyndburn	Labour	2024	1,687	4.6
Andrew Snowden	Fylde	Conservative	2024	561	1.2
Hannah Spencer	Gorton and Denton	Green	2026 by-election	4,402	12.0
Graham Stringer	Blackley and Middleton South	Labour	2024 (Note: Stringer was formerly the MP for Blackley and Broughton from 2010 until the constituency was abolished, and previously Manchester Blackley from 1997 until the constituency was abolished.)	10,220	32.7
Derek Twigg	Widnes and Halewood	Labour	2024 (Note: Twigg was formerly the MP for Halton since 1997 until the constituency was abolished.)	16,425	43.1
Christian Wakeford	Bury South	Labour	2019	9,361	22.2
Paul Waugh	Rochdale	Labour Co-op	2024	1,440	3.6
Chris Webb	Blackpool South	Labour	2024	6,868	19.5
Andrew Western	Stretford and Urmston	Labour	2022	16,150	35.1
Michael Wheeler	Worsley and Eccles	Labour	2024	11,091	26.1

== MPs in the South East region ==
Affiliation	Members
Labour	35
Conservative	29
Liberal Democrats	24
Green	1
Reform UK	1
Independent	1
Total	91

MP	Constituency	Party	In constituency since	Majority	Majority (%)
Callum Anderson	Buckingham and Bletchley	Labour	2024	2,421	5.0
Josh Babarinde	Eastbourne	Liberal Democrats	2024	12,204	26.8
Olivia Bailey	Reading West and Mid Berkshire	Labour	2024	1,361	3.0
Alex Baker	Aldershot	Labour	2024	5,683	11.7
Alison Bennett	Mid Sussex	Liberal Democrats	2024	6,662	12.5
Siân Berry	Brighton Pavilion	Green	2024	14,290	27.2
Polly Billington	East Thanet	Labour	2024	6,971	16.3
Suella Braverman	Fareham and Waterlooville	Reform (Note: Braverman was re-elected as a Conservative, but defected to Reform UK in January 2026.)	2024 (Note: Braverman was formerly the MP for Fareham since 2015 until the constituency was abolished.)	6,079	12.1
Alex Brewer	North East Hampshire	Liberal Democrats	2024	634	1.1
Jess Brown-Fuller	Chichester	Liberal Democrats	2024	12,172	23.5
Danny Chambers	Winchester	Liberal Democrats	2024	13,821	24.2
Chris Coghlan	Dorking and Horley	Liberal Democrats	2024	5,391	10.8
Beccy Cooper	Worthing West	Labour	2024	3,949	7.7
Claire Coutinho	East Surrey	Conservative	2019	7,450	15.2
Chris Curtis	Milton Keynes North	Labour	2024	5,430	11.8
Emily Darlington	Milton Keynes Central	Labour	2024	7,291	15.3
Mims Davies	East Grinstead and Uckfield	Conservative	2024 (Note: Davies previously served as MP for Mid Sussex from 2019 to 2024, and Eastleigh from 2015 to 2019.)	8,480	16.8
Tan Dhesi	Slough	Labour	2017	3,647	8.4
Jim Dickson	Dartford	Labour	2024	1,192	2.7
Lee Dillon	Newbury	Liberal Democrats	2024	2,377	4.8
Caroline Dinenage	Gosport	Conservative	2010	6,066	13.7
Anneliese Dodds	Oxford East	Labour Co-op	2015	14,465	36.8
Helena Dollimore	Hastings and Rye	Labour Co-op	2024	8,653	18.83
Rosie Duffield	Canterbury	Independent (Note: Duffield resigned from Labour in September 2024. She sits as an independent.)	2017	8,653	18.4
Lauren Edwards	Rochester and Strood	Labour	2024	2,293	5.4
Will Forster	Woking	Liberal Democrats	2024	11,246	23.4
Zöe Franklin	Guildford	Liberal Democrats	2024	8,429	17.5
Roger Gale	Herne Bay and Sandwich	Conservative	2024 (Note: Gale was formerly the MP for North Thanet since 1983 until the constituency was abolished.)	2,499	5.1
Nus Ghani	Sussex Weald	Conservative	2024 (Note: Ghani was formerly the MP for Wealden since 2015 until the constituency was abolished.)	6,842	13.9
Olly Glover	Didcot and Wantage	Liberal Democrats	2024	6,233	11.4
Helen Grant	Maidstone and Malling	Conservative	2024 (Note: Grant was formerly the MP for Maidstone and The Weald since 2010 until the constituency was abolished.)	1,674	3.6
Sarah Green	Chesham and Amersham	Liberal Democrats	2021	5,451	10.1
Andrew Griffith	Arundel and South Downs	Conservative	2019	12,134	22.2
Alison Griffiths	Bognor Regis and Littlehampton	Conservative	2024	3,651	7.6
Monica Harding	Esher and Walton	Liberal Democrats	2024	12,003	22.3
Damian Hinds	East Hampshire	Conservative	2010	1,275	2.5
Paul Holmes	Hamble Valley	Conservative	2024 (Note: Holmes previously served as MP for Eastleigh from 2019 to 2024.)	4,809	8.9
Jeremy Hunt	Godalming and Ash	Conservative	2024 (Note: Hunt was formerly the MP for South West Surrey since 2005 until the constituency was abolished.)	891	1.5
Liz Jarvis	Eastleigh	Liberal Democrats	2024	1,546	3.3
Clive Jones	Wokingham	Liberal Democrats	2024	8,345	15.5
Lincoln Jopp	Spelthorne	Conservative	2024	1,590	3.4
Sojan Joseph	Ashford	Labour	2024	1,779	3.8
Satvir Kaur	Southampton Test	Labour	2024	9,333	26.0
Naushabah Khan	Gillingham and Rainham	Labour	2024	3,972	9.6
Peter Kyle	Hove and Portslade	Labour	2015	19,881	38.1
Laura Kyrke-Smith	Aylesbury	Labour	2024	630	1.3
Katie Lam	Weald of Kent	Conservative	2024	8,422	16.6
Peter Lamb	Crawley	Labour	2024	5,235	11.5
Julian Lewis	New Forest East	Conservative	1997	8,495	18.8
James MacCleary	Lewes	Liberal Democrats	2024	12,624	23.8
Helen Maguire	Epsom and Ewell	Liberal Democrats	2024	3,686	6.7
Alan Mak	Havant	Conservative	2015	92	0.2
Kit Malthouse	North West Hampshire	Conservative	2015	3,288	6.5
Amanda Martin	Portsmouth North	Labour	2024	780	1.8
Mike Martin	Tunbridge Wells	Liberal Democrats	2024	8,687	16.0
Charlie Maynard	Witney	Liberal Democrats	2024	4,339	8.6
Kevin McKenna	Sittingbourne and Sheppey	Labour	2024	355	0.9
Calum Miller	Bicester and Woodstock	Liberal Democrats	2024	4,958	9.9
John Milne	Horsham	Liberal Democrats	2024	2,517	4.6
Layla Moran	Oxford West and Abingdon	Liberal Democrats	2017	14,894	32.4
Stephen Morgan	Portsmouth South	Labour	2017	13,155	33.8
Joy Morrissey	Beaconsfield	Conservative	2019	5,455	11.4
Kieran Mullan	Bexhill and Battle	Conservative	2024 (Note: Mullan previously served as MP for Crewe and Nantwich from 2019 to 2024.)	2,657	5.6
Luke Murphy	Basingstoke	Labour	2024	6,484	13.2
Caroline Nokes	Romsey and Southampton North	Conservative	2010	2,191	4.4
Tris Osborne	Chatham and Aylesford	Labour	2024	1,998	4.9
Darren Paffey	Southampton Itchen	Labour	2024	6,105	16.1
Rebecca Paul	Reigate	Conservative	2024	3,187	6.0
Al Pinkerton	Surrey Heath	Liberal Democrats	2024	5,640	11.8
Richard Quigley	Isle of Wight West	Labour	2024	3,117	9.3
Jack Rankin	Windsor	Conservative	2024	6,457	14.3
Emma Reynolds	Wycombe	Labour	2024 (Note: Reynolds previously served as MP for Wolverhampton North East from 2010 to 2019.)	4,591	10.3
Joshua Reynolds	Maidenhead	Liberal Democrats	2024	2,963	5.9
Joe Robertson	Isle of Wight East	Conservative	2024	3,323	9.8
Matt Rodda	Reading Central	Labour	2024 (Note: Rodda was formerly the MP for Reading East since 2017 until the constituency was abolished.)	12,637	27.9
Tom Rutland	East Worthing and Shoreham	Labour	2024	9,519	19.4
Greg Smith	Mid Buckinghamshire	Conservative	2024 (Note: Smith was formerly the MP for Buckingham since 2019 until the constituency was abolished.)	5,872	10.8
Ben Spencer	Runnymede and Weybridge	Conservative	2019	7,627	15.8
Greg Stafford	Farnham and Bordon	Conservative	2024	1,349	2.5
Lauren Sullivan	Gravesham	Labour	2024	2,712	6.3
Peter Swallow	Bracknell	Labour	2024	784	1.8
Desmond Swayne	New Forest West	Conservative	1997	5,600	12.1
Mike Tapp	Dover and Deal	Labour	2024	7,559	15.8
Laura Trott	Sevenoaks	Conservative	2019	5,440	10.9
Tom Tugendhat	Tonbridge	Conservative	2024 (Note: Tugendhat was formerly the MP for Tonbridge and Malling since 2015 until the constituency was abolished.)	11,166	22.0
Freddie van Mierlo	Henley and Thame	Liberal Democrats	2024	6,267	11.8
Tony Vaughan	Folkestone and Hythe	Labour	2024	3,729	8.6
Chris Ward	Brighton Kemptown and Peacehaven	Labour	2024	9,609	23.8
Helen Whately	Faversham and Mid Kent	Conservative	2015	1,469	3.2
Sean Woodcock	Banbury	Labour	2024	3,256	6.7
Yuan Yang	Earley and Woodley	Labour	2024	848	1.9

== MPs in the South West region ==
Affiliation	Members
Labour	24
Liberal Democrats	21
Conservative	10
Green	1
Reform UK	1
Independent	1
Total	58

MP	Constituency	Party	In constituency since	Majority	Majority (%)
Sadik Al-Hassan	North Somerset	Labour	2024	639	1.2
Dan Aldridge	Weston-super-Mare	Labour	2024	4,409	10.4
Heidi Alexander	Swindon South	Labour	2024 (Note: Alexander previously served as MP for Lewisham East from 2010 to 2018.)	9,606	21.5
Gideon Amos	Taunton and Wellington	Liberal Democrats	2024	11,939	23.8
Matt Bishop	Forest of Dean	Labour	2024	278	0.5
Christopher Chope	Christchurch	Conservative	1997	7,455	15.8
Geoffrey Clifton-Brown	North Cotswolds	Conservative	2024 (Note: Clifton-Brown was formerly the MP for The Cotswolds from 1997 until the constituency was abolished, and previously Cirencester and Tewkesbury from 1992 until the constituency was abolished.)	3,357	4.7
Geoffrey Cox	Torridge and Tavistock	Conservative	2024 (Note: Cox was formerly the MP for Torridge and West Devon since 2005 until the constituency was abolished.)	3,950	7.8
Adam Dance	Yeovil	Liberal Democrats	2024	12,286	25.2
Steve Darling	Torbay	Liberal Democrats	2024	5,349	11.6
Carla Denyer	Bristol Central	Green	2024	10,407	24.0
Neil Duncan-Jordan	Poole	Labour	2024	18	0.04
Sarah Dyke	Glastonbury and Somerton	Liberal Democrats	2024 (Note: Dyke was formerly the MP for Somerton and Frome since a by-election in July 2023 until the constituency was abolished.)	6,611	13.8
Damien Egan	Bristol North East	Labour	2024 (Note: Egan was formerly the MP for Kingswood since a by-election in February 2024 until the constituency was abolished.)	11,167	26.6
Richard Foord	Honiton and Sidmouth	Liberal Democrats	2024 (Note: Foord was formerly the MP for Tiverton and Honiton since a by-election in June 2022 until the constituency was abolished.)	6,700	13.2
Ashley Fox	Bridgwater	Conservative	2024	1,349	3.4
Anna Gelderd	South East Cornwall	Labour	2024	1,911	3.9
Andrew George	St Ives	Liberal Democrats	2024 (Note: George previously served the constituency as MP from 1997 to 2015.)	13,786	28.6
Sarah Gibson	Chippenham	Liberal Democrats	2024	8,138	11.2
Rachel Gilmour	Tiverton and Minehead	Liberal Democrats	2024	3,507	7.4
John Glen	Salisbury	Conservative	2010	3,807	7.6
Lloyd Hatton	South Dorset	Labour	2024	1,048	2.1
Tom Hayes	Bournemouth East	Labour	2024	5,479	12.2
Claire Hazelgrove	Filton and Bradley Stoke	Labour	2024	10,000	19.9
Simon Hoare	North Dorset	Conservative	2015	1,589	3.1
Wera Hobhouse	Bath	Liberal Democrats	2017	11,218	23.3
Darren Jones	Bristol North West	Labour	2017	15,669	32.3
Jayne Kirkham	Truro and Falmouth	Labour Co-op	2024	8,151	16.2
Danny Kruger	East Wiltshire	Reform (Note: Kruger was re-elected as a Conservative, but defected to Reform UK in September 2025.)	2024 (Note: Kruger was formerly the MP for Devizes since 2019 until the constituency was abolished.)	4,716	10.0
Noah Law	St Austell and Newquay	Labour	2024	2,470	5.2
Ben Maguire	North Cornwall	Liberal Democrats	2024	10,767	19.4
Brian Mathew	Melksham and Devizes	Liberal Democrats	2024	2,401	4.7
Kerry McCarthy	Bristol East	Labour	2005	6,606	14.3
Alex McIntyre	Gloucester	Labour	2024	3,431	7.6
Perran Moon	Camborne and Redruth	Labour	2024	7,806	16.3
Edward Morello	West Dorset	Liberal Democrats	2024	7,789	14.6
Tessa Munt	Wells and Mendip Hills	Liberal Democrats	2024 (Note: Munt previously served as MP for Wells from 2010 to 2015.)	11,121	22.1
Andrew Murrison	South West Wiltshire	Conservative	2010 (Note: Murrison was formerly the MP for Westbury since 2001 until the constituency was abolished.)	3,243	7.0
Dan Norris	North East Somerset and Hanham	Labour	2024 (Note: Norris previously served as MP for Wansdyke from 1997 to 2010.)	5,319	10.4
Simon Opher	Stroud	Labour	2024	11,411	20.7
Luke Pollard	Plymouth Sutton and Devonport	Labour Co-op	2017	13,328	31.7
Steve Race	Exeter	Labour	2024	11,937	29.7
David Reed	Exmouth and Exeter East	Conservative	2024	121	0.2
Ian Roome	North Devon	Liberal Democrats	2024	6,744	13.1
Anna Sabine	Frome and East Somerset	Liberal Democrats	2024	5,415	11.6
Roz Savage	South Cotswolds	Liberal Democrats	2024	4,973	9.5
Vikki Slade	Mid Dorset and North Poole	Liberal Democrats	2024	1,352	2.7
Rebecca Smith	South West Devon	Conservative	2024	2,112	4.0
Karin Smyth	Bristol South	Labour	2015	7,666	17.7
Will Stone	Swindon North	Labour	2024	4,103	9.3
Mel Stride	Central Devon	Conservative	2010	61	0.1
Cameron Thomas	Tewkesbury	Independent (Note: Thomas was suspended from the Liberal Democrats in June 2026. He sits as an independent.)	2024	6,262	12.9
Fred Thomas	Plymouth Moor View	Labour	2024	5,604	13.1
Jessica Toale	Bournemouth West	Labour	2024	3,224	8.1
Caroline Voaden	South Devon	Liberal Democrats	2024	7,127	10.7
Max Wilkinson	Cheltenham	Liberal Democrats	2024	7,210	14.5
Martin Wrigley	Newton Abbot	Liberal Democrats	2024	2,246	4.7
Claire Young	Thornbury and Yate	Liberal Democrats	2024	3,014	3.9

== MPs in the West Midlands region ==
Affiliation	Members
Labour	37
Conservative	15
Liberal Democrats	2
Green	1
Your Party	1
Independent	1
Total	57

MP	Constituency	Party	In constituency since	Majority	Majority (%)
Tahir Ali	Birmingham Hall Green and Moseley	Labour	2024 (Note: Ali was formerly the MP for Birmingham Hall Green since 2019 until the constituency was abolished.)	5,656	13.6
Stuart Anderson	South Shropshire	Conservative	2024 (Note: Anderson was formerly the MP for Wolverhampton South West since 2019 until the constituency was abolished.)	1,624	3.1
Harriett Baldwin	West Worcestershire	Conservative	2010	6,547	12.0
Alex Ballinger	Halesowen	Labour	2024	4,364	11.3
Antonia Bance	Tipton and Wednesbury	Labour	2024	3,385	10.6
Saqib Bhatti	Meriden and Solihull East	Conservative	2024 (Note: Bhatti was formerly the MP for Meriden since 2019 until the constituency was abolished.)	4,584	10.4
Chris Bloore	Redditch	Labour	2024	789	1.8
Sureena Brackenridge	Wolverhampton North East	Labour	2024	5,422	16.3
Karen Bradley	Staffordshire Moorlands	Conservative	2010	1,175	2.8
Julia Buckley	Shrewsbury	Labour	2024	11,355	22.0
Liam Byrne	Birmingham Hodge Hill and Solihull North	Labour	2024 (Note: Byrne was formerly the MP for Birmingham Hodge Hill since a by-election in July 2004 until the constituency was abolished.)	1,566	4.6
Alistair Carns	Birmingham Selly Oak	Labour	2024	11,537	30.1
Ellie Chowns	North Herefordshire	Green	2024	5,894	11.7
Jacob Collier	Burton and Uttoxeter	Labour	2024	2,266	5.0
Tom Collins	Worcester	Labour	2024	7,116	15.5
Sarah Coombes	West Bromwich	Labour	2024	9,554	26.1
Mary Creagh	Coventry East	Labour	2024 (Note: Creagh previously served as MP for Wakefield from 2005 to 2019.)	11,623	31.3
Shaun Davies	Telford	Labour	2024	8,102	19.9
Cat Eccles	Stourbridge	Labour	2024	3,073	7.7
Sarah Edwards	Tamworth	Labour	2023	1,382	3.1
Allison Gardner	Stoke-on-Trent South	Labour	2024	627	1.5
Mark Garnier	Wyre Forest	Conservative	2010	812	1.8
Preet Kaur Gill	Birmingham Edgbaston	Labour Co-op	2017	8,368	22.3
Jodie Gosling	Nuneaton	Labour	2024	3,479	8.4
Paulette Hamilton	Birmingham Erdington	Labour	2022	7,019	20.8
Nigel Huddleston	Droitwich and Evesham	Conservative	2024 (Note: Huddleston was formerly the MP for Mid Worcestershire since 2015 until the constituency was abolished.)	8,995	18.1
Leigh Ingham	Stafford	Labour	2024	4,595	10.0
Adam Jogee	Newcastle-under-Lyme	Labour	2024	5,069	12.8
Gurinder Josan	Smethwick	Labour	2024	11,188	31.9
Warinder Juss	Wolverhampton West	Labour	2024	7,868	18.0
Ayoub Khan	Birmingham Perry Barr	Independent	2024	507	1.4
Sonia Kumar	Dudley	Labour	2024	1,900	5.3
Shabana Mahmood	Birmingham Ladywood	Labour	2010	3,421	9.3
Pat McFadden	Wolverhampton South East	Labour	2005	9,188	27.5
Andrew Mitchell	Sutton Coldfield	Conservative	2001 (Note: Mitchell previously served as MP for Gedling from 1987 to 1997.)	2,543	5.3
Helen Morgan	North Shropshire	Liberal Democrats	2021	15,311	30.9
Wendy Morton	Aldridge-Brownhills	Conservative	2015	4,231	10.3
Josh Newbury	Cannock Chase	Labour	2024	3,125	7.3
Jesse Norman	Hereford and South Herefordshire	Conservative	2010	1,279	2.8
Taiwo Owatemi	Coventry North West	Labour	2019	11,174	26.6
Manuela Perteghella	Stratford-on-Avon	Liberal Democrats	2024	7,122	13.5
Jess Phillips	Birmingham Yardley	Labour	2015	693	1.9
Mark Pritchard	The Wrekin	Conservative	2005	883	1.8
Dave Robertson	Lichfield	Labour	2024	810	1.7
Neil Shastri-Hurst	Solihull West and Shirley	Conservative	2024	4,620	9.8
John Slinger	Rugby	Labour	2024	4,428	9.0
Gareth Snell	Stoke-on-Trent Central	Labour Co-op	2024 (Note: Snell previously served the constituency as MP from 2017 to 2019.)	6,409	18.2
Zarah Sultana	Coventry South	Your Party (Note: Sultana resigned from Labour in June 2025 and was named Your Party's first MP in November. She sat as an independent in the interim.)	2019	10,201	23.8
Rachel Taylor	North Warwickshire and Bedworth	Labour	2024	2,198	5.4
Bradley Thomas	Bromsgrove	Conservative	2024	3,016	6.0
Laurence Turner	Birmingham Northfield	Labour	2024	5,389	14.3
Valerie Vaz	Walsall and Bloxwich	Labour	2024 (Note: Vaz was formerly the MP for Walsall South since 2010 until the constituency was abolished.)	4,914	13.2
Matt Western	Warwick and Leamington	Labour	2017	12,412	25.2
David Williams	Stoke-on-Trent North	Labour	2024	5,082	14.1
Gavin Williamson	Stone, Great Wyrley and Penkridge	Conservative	2024 (Note: Williamson was formerly the MP for South Staffordshire since 2010 until the constituency was abolished.)	5,466	12.8
Mike Wood	Kingswinford and South Staffordshire	Conservative	2024 (Note: Wood was formerly the MP for Dudley South since 2015 until the constituency was abolished.)	6,303	14.0
Jeremy Wright	Kenilworth and Southam	Conservative	2010 (Note: Wright was formerly the MP for Rugby and Kenilworth since 2005 until the constituency was abolished.)	6,574	12.4

== MPs in the Yorkshire and the Humber region ==
Affiliation	Members
Labour	42
Conservative	9
Liberal Democrats	1
Independent	2
Total	54

MP	Constituency	Party	In constituency since	Majority	Majority (%)
Hilary Benn	Leeds South	Labour	2024 (Note: Benn was formerly the MP for Leeds Central since a by-election in May 1999 until the constituency was abolished.)	11,279	35.6
Clive Betts	Sheffield South East	Labour	2010 (Note: Betts was formerly the MP for Sheffield Attercliffe from 1992 until the constituency was abolished.)	12,458	34.8
Olivia Blake	Sheffield Hallam	Labour	2019	8,189	15.9
Jade Botterill	Ossett and Denby Dale	Labour	2024	4,542	10.4
Richard Burgon	Leeds East	Labour	2015	11,265	38.6
Sarah Champion	Rotherham	Labour	2012	5,490	14.9
Luke Charters	York Outer	Labour	2024	9,391	18.4
Yvette Cooper	Pontefract, Castleford and Knottingley	Labour	2024 (Note: Cooper was formerly the MP for Normanton, Pontefract and Castleford from 2010 until the constituency was abolished, and previously Pontefract and Castleford from 1997 until the constituency was abolished.)	6,630	18.4
Judith Cummins	Bradford South	Labour	2015	4,362	13.2
Nic Dakin	Scunthorpe	Labour	2024 (Note: Dakin previously served the constituency as MP from 2010 to 2019.)	3,542	9.1
Paul Davies	Colne Valley	Labour	2024	4,963	10.7
David Davis	Goole and Pocklington	Conservative	2024 (Note: Davis was formerly the MP for Haltemprice and Howden from 1997 until the constituency was abolished, and previously Boothferry from 1987 until the constituency was abolished.)	3,572	7.2
Kate Dearden	Halifax	Labour	2024	6,269	15.5
Charlie Dewhirst	Bridlington and The Wolds	Conservative	2024	3,125	7.3
Anna Dixon	Shipley	Labour	2024	8,603	17.8
Josh Fenton-Glynn	Calder Valley	Labour	2024	8,991	18.1
Gill Furniss	Sheffield Brightside and Hillsborough	Labour	2016	11,600	36.7
Tom Gordon	Harrogate and Knaresborough	Liberal Democrats	2024	8,238	15.9
Louise Haigh	Sheffield Heeley	Labour	2015	15,304	39.8
Fabian Hamilton	Leeds North East	Labour	1997	16,083	35.6
Emma Hardy	Kingston upon Hull West and Haltemprice	Labour	2024 (Note: Hardy was formerly the MP for Kingston upon Hull West and Hessle since 2017 until the constituency was abolished.)	8,979	23.5
John Healey	Rawmarsh and Conisbrough	Labour	2024 (Note: Healey was formerly the MP for Wentworth and Dearne from 2010 until the constituency was abolished, and previously Wentworth from 1997 until the constituency was abolished.)	6,908	20.4
Kevin Hollinrake	Thirsk and Malton	Conservative	2015	7,550	15.1
Alison Hume	Scarborough and Whitby	Labour	2024	5,408	12.3
Imran Hussain	Bradford East	Labour	2015	6,189	16.6
Sally Jameson	Doncaster Central	Labour Co-op	2024	9,551	25.1
Dan Jarvis	Barnsley North	Labour	2024 (Note: Jarvis was formerly the MP for Barnsley Central since a by-election in March 2011 until the constituency was abolished.)	7,811	21.1
Diana Johnson	Kingston upon Hull North and Cottingham	Labour	2024 (Note: Johnson was formerly the MP for Kingston upon Hull North since 2005 until the constituency was abolished.)	10,769	27.9
Kim Leadbeater	Spen Valley	Labour	2024 (Note: Leadbeater was formerly the MP for Batley and Spen since a by-election in July 2021 until the constituency was abolished.)	6,188	15.1
Simon Lightwood	Wakefield and Rothwell	Labour Co-op	2024 (Note: Lightwood was formerly the MP for Wakefield since a by-election in June 2022 until the constituency was abolished.)	9,346	23.0
Rachael Maskell	York Central	Labour Co-op	2015	19,154	44.2
Keir Mather	Selby	Labour	2024 (Note: Mather was formerly the MP for Selby and Ainsty since a by-election in July 2023 until the constituency was abolished.)	10,195	20.7
Ed Miliband	Doncaster North	Labour	2005	9,216	29.5
Abtisam Mohamed	Sheffield Central	Labour	2024	8,286	26.1
Iqbal Mohamed	Dewsbury and Batley	Independent	2024	6,934	18.2
Robbie Moore	Keighley and Ilkley	Conservative	2019	1,625	3.6
Melanie Onn	Great Grimsby and Cleethorpes	Labour	2024 (Note: Onn previously served as MP for Great Grimsby from 2015 to 2019.)	4,803	13.1
Stephanie Peacock	Barnsley South	Labour	2024 (Note: Peacock was formerly the MP for Barnsley East since 2017 until the constituency was abolished.)	4,748	13.5
Lee Pitcher	Doncaster East and the Isle of Axholme	Labour	2024	2,311	5.9
Rachel Reeves	Leeds West and Pudsey	Labour	2024 (Note: Reeves was formerly the MP for Leeds West since 2010 until the constituency was abolished.)	12,392	32.2
Jake Richards	Rother Valley	Labour	2024	998	2.4
Mark Sewards	Leeds South West and Morley	Labour	2024	8,423	21.0
Naz Shah	Bradford West	Labour	2015	707	1.9
Alec Shelbrooke	Wetherby and Easingwold	Conservative	2024 (Note: Shelbrooke was formerly the MP for Elmet and Rothwell from 2010 until the constituency was abolished.)	4,846	9.3
Julian Smith	Skipton and Ripon	Conservative	2010	1,650	3.1
Alex Sobel	Leeds Central and Headingley	Labour Co-op	2024 (Note: Sobel previously served as MP for Leeds North West from 2017 to 2024.)	8,422	26.7
Graham Stuart	Beverley and Holderness	Conservative	2005	124	0.3
Rishi Sunak	Richmond and Northallerton	Conservative	2024 (Note: Sunak was formerly the MP for Richmond (Yorks) from 2015 until the constituency was abolished.)	12,185	25.1
Marie Tidball	Penistone and Stocksbridge	Labour	2024	8,739	19.9
Jon Trickett	Normanton and Hemsworth	Labour	2024 (Note: Trickett was formerly the MP for Hemsworth since a by-election in February 1996 until the constituency was abolished.)	6,662	18.3
Karl Turner	Kingston upon Hull East	Independent (Note: Turner was suspended from Labour in March 2026. He sits as an independent.)	2010	3,920	13.2
Harpreet Uppal	Huddersfield	Labour	2024	4,533	11.3
Martin Vickers	Brigg and Immingham	Conservative	2024 (Note: Vickers was formerly the MP for Cleethorpes since 2010 until the constituency was abolished.)	3,243	7.6
Katie White	Leeds North West	Labour	2024	11,896	23.9

== By-elections ==
- 2025 Runcorn and Helsby by-election
- 2026 Gorton and Denton by-election
- 2026 Makerfield by-election
- 2026 Clacton by-election
- 2026 Holborn and St Pancras by-election
