= List of politicians associated with Balliol College, Oxford =

This is a list of people associated with Balliol College, Oxford who were or are politicians or senior public servants.

== Politicians currently active ==
=== Members of Parliament ===
Image	Name	Join Date & Area of Study	Background	Politics	Refs
	Yuan Yang	2008; PPE	Balliol (B.S., 2011); LSE (M.S., 2013); Foreign correspondent, Financial Times	Born in Ningbo, China; moved to England aged 4 Labour MP for Earley and Woodley (2024–present)	
	Kanishka Narayan	2008; PPE	Balliol (B.A.); Stanford (M.B.A.)	Labour MP for Vale of Glamorgan (2024–present); Parliamentary Under-Secretary of State for AI and Online Safety (2025–2026); Minister for Artificial Intelligence (2026–present)	
	Matthew Pennycook	2005; Int Rel	LSE (B.A., 2005); Balliol (M.Phil.)	Labour MP for Greenwich and Woolwich (2015–present); Minister of State for Housing and Planning (2024–present)	
	Helen Hayes	1997; PPE	Balliol (B.A.) town planner	Labour MP for Dulwich and West Norwood (2015–present); Chair of the Education Committee (2024–present)	
	Kirsty McNeill	1997; PPE	Balliol (B.A., 2001) Executive Director, Save the Children	Scottish Labour/Co-operative MP for Midlothian (2024–present); Parliamentary Under-Secretary of State for Scotland (2024–2026); Minister of State in Foreign Office (2026–present)	
	Yvette Cooper	1987; PPE	Balliol (B.A., 1991); LSE (M.S., 1993)	Labour MP from Pontefract, Castleford and Knottingley (Note: Formerly known as Pontefract and Castleford from 1997–2010 and Normanton, Pontefract and Castleford from 2010–2024.) (1997–present); Chief Secretary to the Treasury (2008–2009); Secretary of State for Work and Pensions (2009–2010); Home Secretary (2024–2025); Foreign Secretary (2025–2026); Health Secretary (2026–present)	
	Sir Julian Lewis	1970; PPE	Balliol (M.A.); St Antony's College (Ph.D., 1981)	Conservative MP for New Forest East (1997–present); Chair of the Defence Select Committee (2015–2019); Chair of the Intelligence and Security Committee (2020–2024)	

=== Members of the House of Lords ===
Image	Name	Join Date & Area of Study	Background	Politics	Refs
	The Baroness Ussher (Kitty Ussher)	1990; PPE	Balliol (B.A.); Birkbeck College, London (M.S.)	Labour MP for Burnley (2005–2010); Economic Secretary to the Treasury (2007–2008); Parliamentary Under-Secretary of State for Work and Pensions (2008–2009); Exchequer Secretary to the Treasury (2009); Life peerage (3 September 2026)	
	Baron Johnson of Marylebone (Jo Johnson)	1991; Modern History	Balliol (B.A., 1994); INSEAD (MBA, 2000)	Conservative MP for Orpington (2010–2019); Universities Minister (2015–2018, 2019); Life peerage (12 October 2020)	
	Baron Stevens of Birmingham (Simon Stevens)	1984; PPE	Balliol (M.A.); University of Strathclyde (MBA)	Labour councillor in Lambeth (1998–2002); Chief Executive of NHS England (2014–2021); Life peerage (5 July 2021)	
	Baroness Simon of Wythenshawe (Matilda Simon)	1973; Engineering	Balliol (B.S.); University of Manchester (PhD, 1983)	Succeeded father 2002, and retained title although assigned male at birth. Green party.	
	Lord Lucas and Dingwall (Ralph Palmer)	1969; Physics	Balliol (B.A.)	Hereditary peerage (31 December 1991–11 November 1999); Elected hereditary peer (11 November 1999); Owner and publisher of Good Schools Guide from 2000.	
	Baron Patten of Barnes (Chris Patten)	1962; Modern History	Balliol (B.A., 1965)	Conservative MP for Bath (1979–1992); Secretary of State for the Environment (1989–1990); Chancellor of the Duchy of Lancaster, Chairman of the Conservative Party (1990–1992); Governor of Hong Kong (1992–1997); European Commissioner (1999–2004); Chancellor of Oxford University (2003–2024); Life peerage (11 January 2005)	
	Baron Beith (Alan Beith)	1961; PPE	Balliol (B.A., 1964); Nuffield (B.Litt.)	Liberal (Democrat) MP for Berwick-upon-Tweed (1973–2015); Deputy Leader of Liberal Democrats (1992–2003); Chair of the Liaison Committee (2010–2015); Life peerage (19 October 2015)	

== MPs who completed service in 2024 ==
Image	Name	Join Date & Area of Study	Background	Politics	Refs
	David Johnston	2000; Modern History and Politics	Balliol (B.A., 2003)	CEO Social Mobility Foundation 2009-2020 Conservative MP for Wantage (2019–2024); Parliamentary Under-Secretary of State for Children, Families and Wellbeing (2023–2024)	
	Robin Walker	1997; Ancient and Modern History	Balliol (B.A.)	Conservative MP for Worcester (2010–2024); Minister of State for School Standards (2021–2022); Chair of Education Committee (2022–2024)	
	Boris Johnson	1983; Literae Humaniores	Balliol (B.A., 1987)	Conservative MP for Henley (2001–2008); Mayor of London (2008–2016); MP for Uxbridge & South Ruislip (2015–2023); Foreign Secretary (2016–2018); Prime Minister & Leader of the Conservative Party (2019–2022)	
	Damian Green	1974; PPE	Balliol (B.A., 1977)	Conservative MP for Ashford (1997–2024); Secretary of State for Work and Pensions (2016–2017); First Secretary of State and Minister for the Cabinet Office (2017)	

== UK politicians active in era 1979–2020 ==
Image	Name	Join Date & Area of Study	Background	Politics	Refs
	Charlotte Leslie	1997; Literae Humaniores	Balliol (2001)	Conservative MP for Bristol North West (2010–2017); Director of the Conservative Middle East Council (2017–present)	
	Rory Stewart	1992; History/PPE	Balliol (B.A.)	Conservative MP for Penrith and The Border (2010–2019); Minister of State for International Development (2016–2018); Minister of State for Africa (2017–2018); Minister of State for Prisons (2018–2019); Secretary of State for International Development (2019)	
	James Purnell	1988; PPE	Balliol (B.A.)	Labour MP for Stalybridge and Hyde (2001–2010); Secretary of State for Culture, Media and Sport (2007–2008); Secretary of State for Work and Pensions (2008–2009)	
	Stephen Twigg	1985; PPE	Balliol (B.A.)	Labour MP for Enfield Southgate (1997–2005); MP for Liverpool West Derby (2010–2019); Deputy Leader of the House of Commons (2001–2002); Minister for School Standards (2004–2005)	
	David Faber	1980; Modern Languages	Balliol (B.A.)	Conservative MP for Westbury (1992–2001)	
	Ian Pearson	1977; PPE	Balliol (B.A.); University of Warwick (M.A., Ph.D.)	Labour MP for Dudley West/South (1994–2010); Economic Secretary to the Treasury (2008–2010)	
	Dr Charles Tannock	1976; Medicine	Balliol; UCL Medical School	Conservative MEP for London (1999–2019)	
	Sir Nigel Sheinwald	1972	diplomacy	Permanent Representative to the EU (2000–2003); Ambassador to the United States (2007–2012)	
	Tony Wright	1971	LSE (B.A., 1970); Balliol (Ph.D., 1977)	Labour MP for Cannock and Burntwood (1992–1997) and Cannock Chase (1997–2010)	
	Sir John Holmes	1969	diplomacy	Principal Private Secretary to the Prime Minister (1997–1999); Ambassador to Portugal (1999–2001); Ambassador to France (2001–2006)	
	Sir Neil MacCormick (1941–2009)	1963	University of Glasgow (M.A.); Balliol (B.A.); University of Edinburgh (L.L.D.)	MEP for Scotland (1999–2004)	
	Stuart Holland	1960; History	Balliol (B.A.)	Labour MP for Vauxhall (1979–1989); Shadow Minister for Overseas Development (1983–1987)	

== Members of the House of Lords who have died since 2000 ==
Image	Name	Join Date	Background	Politics	Refs
	James Douglas-Hamilton (1942–2023)	1961; Modern History	Balliol (B.A.); University of Edinburgh (L.L.B.)	Conservative MP for Edinburgh West (1974–1997); Minister of State for Scotland (1995–1997); Life peerage (29 September 1997–27 July 2023)	
	Robert Maclennan (1936–2020)	1955; Modern History	Balliol; Trinity College; Columbia	Labour, SDP and Liberal Democrat MP for Caithless, Sutherland and Easter Ross (1966–2001); Leader of the Social Democratic Party (1987–1988); President of the Liberal Democrats (1988, 1995–1998); Life peerage (19 July 2001–18 January 2020)	
	Peter Brooke (1934–2023)	1953; Literae Humaniores	Balliol (B.A.); Harvard Business	Conservative MP for Cities of London and Westminster (1979–2001); Chairman of the Conservative Party & Paymaster General (1987–1989); Secretary of State for Northern Ireland (1989–1992); Secretary of State for National Heritage (1992–1994); Life peerage (30 July 2001–18 September 2015)	
	Patrick Mayhew (1929–2016)	1949; Jurisprudence	Balliol	Conservative MP for Tunbridge Wells (1974–1997); Solicitor General (1983–1987); Attorney General (1987–1992); Secretary of State for Northern Ireland (1992–1997); Life peerage (12 June 1997–1 June 2015)	
	Roger Freeman (1942–2025)	1961; PPE	Balliol (B.A., 1964)	Conservative MP for Kettering (1983–1997); Chancellor of the Duchy of Lancaster (1995–1997); Life peerage (29 October 1997–1 October 2020)	
	Dick Taverne (1928–2025)	1947; Literae humaniores	Balliol (B.A.)	Labour MP for Lincoln (1962–1974); Life peerage (5 February 1996–7 March 2025), Liberal Democrat	

== UK politicians active between World War II and the Millennium ==
Image	Name	Join Date	Background	Politics	Refs
	Mike Woodin (1965–2004)	1990	Manchester, Wolfson College; Balliol Lecturer in Psychology 1990-2004.	Oxford City Councillor for Carfax Ward (1994–2004); Principal Speaker of the Green Party (1997–2000, 2003–2004)	
	Bryan Gould	1962; Law	Auckland University College (BA/LLB, LLM)	Labour MP for Southampton Test (1974–1979); MP for Dagenham (1983–1994)	
	Lord Gowrie (1939–2021)	1959; English	Balliol	Hereditary peerage (27 November 1960–11 November 1999); Minister of State for Employment (1979–1981); Minister of State for Northern Ireland (1981–1983); Minister of State for the Arts (1983–1985); Chancellor of the Duchy of Lancaster (1984–1985)	
	Sir George Gardiner (1935–2002)	1955; PPE	Balliol (B.A., 1958)	Conservative MP for Reigate (1974–1997)	
	Toby Jessel (1934–2018)	1954; PPE	Balliol	Conservative MP for Twickenham (1970–1997)	
	Leif Mills (1936–2020)	1954; PPE	Balliol	Trade union leader. Banking, Insurance and Finance Union: Assistant General Secretary (1962–1968), Deputy General Secretary (1968–1972), General Secretary (1972–1996)	
	Mark Hughes (1932–1993)	1953; Modern History	Balliol (B.A., 1956); Newcastle University (PhD, 1958)	Labour MP for Durham (1970–1987); MEP (1975–1979)	
	John Mackintosh (1929–1978)	1950; PPE	Edinburgh; Balliol; Princeton	Labour MP for Berwick and East Lothian (1966–1974, 1974–1978)	
	Ian Gilmour (1926–2007)	1947; Modern History	Balliol	Conservative MP for Central Norfolk (1962–1974); MP for Chesham and Amersham (1974–1992); Defence Secretary (1974); Lord Privy Seal (1979–1981); Life peerage (25 August 1992–21 September 2007)	
	Sir Nicholas Ridley (1929–1993)	1946	B.A. Mathematics (1947); B.A. English (1951)	Conservative MP for Cirencester and Tewkesbury (1959–1992); Life peerage (28 July 1992–4 March 1993); Financial Secretary to the Treasury (1981–1983); Secretary of State for Transport (1983–1986); Secretary of State for the Environment (1986–1989); Secretary of State for Trade and Industry (1989–1990)	
	David Ginsburg (1921–1994)	1939; PPE	Balliol	Labour & SDP MP for Dewsbury (1959–1983)	
	David James (1919–1986)	1938; Modern History (left)		Conservative MP for Brighton Kemptown (1959–1964); MP for North Dorset (1970–1979)	
	Maurice Macmillan (1921–1984)	1938; Classical History	Balliol	Conservative MP for Halifax (1955–1964); MP for Farnham (1966–1983); MP for South West Surrey (1983–1984); Chief Secretary to the Treasury (1970–1972); Secretary of State for Employment (1972–1973); Paymaster General (1973–1974)	
	Roy Jenkins (1920–2003)	1938; PPE	Balliol	Labour MP for Southwark Central (1948–1950); MP for Birmingham Stechford (1950–1977); President of the European Commission (1977–1981); MP for Glasgow Hillhead (1982–1987); Life peerage (20 November 1987–5 January 2003); Home Secretary (1965–1967, 1974–1976); Chancellor of the Exchequer (1967–1970); Chancellor of the University of Oxford (1987–2003)	
	Julian Amery (1919–1996)	1937; Modern History	Balliol	Conservative MP for Preston North (1950–1966); MP for Brighton Pavilion (1969–1992); Minister of State for Foreign and Commonwealth Affairs (1972–1974)	
	Madron Seligman (1918–2002)	1937; PPE	Balliol	Conservative MEP for Sussex West (1979–1994)	
	Hugh Fraser (1918–1984)	1936; Modern History	Balliol	Conservative MP for Stafford and Stone (1945–1984); Secretary of State for Air (1962–1964)	
	Denis Healey (1917–2015)	1936; Literae Humaniores	Balliol (B.A., 1940)	Labour MP for Leeds (South) East (1952–1992); Life peerage (29 June 1992–3 October 2015); Defence Secretary (1964–1970); Chancellor of the Exchequer (1974–1979); Deputy Leader of the Opposition (1980–1983)	
	Sir Edward Heath (1916–2005)	1935; PPE	Balliol (B.A., 1939)	Conservative MP for Old Bexley and Sidcup (1950–2001); Chief Whip (1955–1960); Lord Privy Seal (1960–1963); President of the Board of Trade (1963–1964); Leader of the Conservative Party (1965–1975); Prime Minister (1970–1974)	
	Nigel Nicolson (1917–2004)	1935; Modern History	Balliol	Conservative MP for Bournemouth East ad Christchurch (1952–1959)	
	Sir Anthony Kershaw (1915–2008)	1934; Modern History	Balliol	Conservative MP for Stroud (1955–1987); Chair of Foreign Affairs Select Committee (1979–1987)	
	Lt Cdr John Baldock (1915–2003)	1934; Botany and Rural Economy	Balliol; Freiburg University	Conservative MP for Harborough (1950–1959)	
	Jo Grimond (1913–1993)	1932; PPE	Balliol	Liberal MP for Orkney and Shetland (1950–1983); Leader of the Liberal Party (1956–1967); Life peerage (12 October 1983–24 October 1993)	
	Anthony Greenwood (1911–1982)	1930; PPE	Balliol	Labour MP for Heywood and Radcliffe (1946–1950); MP for Rossendale (1950–1970); Secretary of State for the Colonies (1964–1965); Minister of Overseas Development (1965–1966); Minister of Housing and Local Government (1966–1970); Life peerage (22 September 1970–12 April 1982)	
	John Boyd-Carpenter (1908–1998)	1927; Modern History	Balliol (B.A., 1931)	Conservative MP for Kingston-upon-Thames (1945–1972); Chief Secretary to the Treasury (1962–1964); Life peerage (1 May 1972–11 July 1998)	
	James MacColl (1908–1971)	1927; PPE	Balliol; Chicago	Mayor of Paddington (1947–1949); Labour MP for Widnes (1950–1971)	
	Sir Dingle Foot (1905–1978)	1924; Modern History	Balliol (B.A., 1928)	Liberal MP for Dundee (1931–1945); Labour MP for Ipswich (1957–1970); Solicitor General (1964–1967)	
	George Douglas-Hamilton, 10th Earl of Selkirk (1906–1994)	1924; PPE	Balliol; University of Edinburgh (LLB)	Elected representative peer (6 July 1945–31 July 1963); Paymaster General (1953–1955); Chancellor of the Duchy of Lancaster (1955–1957); First Lord of the Admiralty (1957–1959)	
	Sir Hamilton Kerr (1903–1974)	1922; Modern History	Balliol	Conservative MP for Oldham (1935–1950); MP for Cambridge (1950–1966)	
	Henry Brooke (1903–1984)	1922; Literae Humaniores	Balliol	MP for Lewisham West (1938–1945); MP for Hampstead (1950–1966); Chief Secretary to the Treasury (1961–1962); Home Secretary (1962–1964); Life peerage (20 July 1966–1970)	
	Christopher Hollis (1902–1977)	1920; Literae Humaniores	Balliol	Conservative MP for Devizes (1945–1955)	
	Harold Macmillan (1894–1986)	1912; Literae Humaniores	Balliol	Conservative MP for Stockton-on-Tees (1924–1929, 1931–1945); MP from Bromley (1945–1964); Secretary of State for Air (1945); Housing Minister (1951–1954); Minister of Defence (1954–1955); Chancellor of the Exchequer (1955–1957); Leader of the Conservative Party & Prime Minister (1957–1963); Chancellor of Oxford University (1960–1986); Life peerage (24 February 1984–29 December 1986)	
	Sir Frank Soskice (1902–1979)	1920; PPE	Balliol	Labour MP for Birkenhead East (1945–1950); MP for Sheffield Neepsend (1951–1955); MP for Newport (1956–1966); Life peerage (7 June 1966–1 January 1979); Solicitor General (1945–1951); Attorney General (1951); Home Secretary (1964–1965); Lord Privy Seal (1965–1966)	
	Walter Monckton (1891–1965)	1910; Modern History	Balliol (1912, 1914)	Conservative MP for Bristol West (1951–1957); Minister of Labour and National Service (1951–1955); Minister of Defence (1955–1956); Paymaster General (1956–1957)	

== UK politicians active between World War I and World War II ==
Image	Name	Join Date & Area of Study	Background	Politics	Refs
	Douglas Douglas-Hamilton, 14th Duke of Hamilton (1903–1973)	1921; Chemistry	Balliol	Unionist MP for East Renfrewshire (1930–1940); Lord Steward of the Household (1940–1964); Chancellor of the University of St Andrews (1948–1973)	
	Tom Wintringham (1898–1949)	1918; Modern History	Balliol	Marxist, Joint founder of Common Wealth Party	
	R. Palme Dutt (1896–1974)	1914; Literae Humaniores	Balliol	General Secretary of Communist Party (1939–1941)	
	Sir Harold Nicolson (1886–1968)	1904; Literae Humaniores	Balliol (1909)	National Labour MP for Leicester West (1935–1945)	
	Aubrey Herbert (1880–1923)	1898; Modern History	Balliol	Conservative MP for South Somerset (1911–1918); MP for Yeovil (1918–1923)	
	Sir Arthur Steel-Maitland (1876–1935)	1895; Literae Humaniores and Jurisprudence	Balliol (B.A., 1899); All Souls College (M.A., 1903)	Unionist/Conservative MP for Birmingham East (1910–1918); MP for Birmingham Erdington (1918–1928); MP for Tamworth (1929–1935); Chairman of the Conservative Party (1911–1916); Minister of Labour (1924–1929)	
	Leo Amery (1873–1955)	1892; Literae Humaniores	Balliol (1894; 1896)	MP (Liberal Unionist) for Birmingham South (1911–1918); MP (Unionist, Conservative) for Birmingham Sparkbrook (1918–1945); First Lord of the Admiralty (1922–1923); Secretary of State for the Colonies (1924–1929); Secretary of State for India and Burma (1940–1945)	
	Herbert Samuel (1870–1963)	1889; Modern History	Balliol	Liberal MP for Cleveland (1902–1918); MP for Darwen (1929–1935); Chancellor of the Duchy of Lancaster (1909–1910, 1915–1916); Home Secretary (1916, 1931–1932); Leader of the Liberal Party (1931–1935); Leader of the Liberals in the House of Lords (1945–1955)	
	George Nathaniel Curzon (1859–1925)	1878; Literae Humaniores	Balliol	Conservative MP for Southport (1886–1898); Viceroy and Governor-General of India (1899–1905); Chancellor of the University of Oxford (1907–1925); Irish representative peer (21 January 1908–20 March 1925); Lord Privy Seal (1915–1916); Lord President of the Council (1916–1919, 1924–1925); Leader of the House of Lords (1916–1924, 1924–1925); Foreign Secretary (1919–1924)	
	Alfred Milner, Viscount Milner (1854–1925)	1872; Literae Humaniores	Balliol (1877)	Governor of the Cape Colony and High Commissioner for Southern Africa (1897–1901); Governor of the Transvaal Colony and Orange River Colony (1901–1905); Secretary of State for War (1918–1919); Secretary of State for the Colonies (1919–1921)	
	H. H. Asquith (1852–1928)	1870	Balliol (1874)	Liberal MP for East Fife (1886–1918); MP for Paisley (1920–1924); Hereditary peerage (10 February 1925–15 February 1928); Home Secretary (1892–1895); Chancellor of the Exchequer (1905–1908); Prime Minister (1908–1916)	

== UK politicians pre-World War I ==
Image	Name	Join Date & Area of Study	Background	Politics	Refs
	Edward Grey, 1st Viscount Grey of Fallodon (1862–1933)	1880; Jurisprudence	Balliol	Liberal MP for Berwick-upon-Tweed (1885–1916); Foreign Secretary (1905–1916); Hereditary peerage (27 July 1916–7 September 1933); British Ambassador to the United States (1919–1920); Chancellor of the University of Oxford (1928–1933)	
	Victor Bruce (1849–1917)	1870; Literae Humaniores	Balliol (B.A., 1873)	Viceroy and Governor-General of India (1894–1899); Secretary of State for the Colonies (1905–1908)	
	Robert Reid, 1st Earl Loreburn (1846–1923)	1864; Literae Humaniores	Balliol (1868)	Liberal MP for Hereford (1880–1885); MP for Dumfries Burghs (1886–1905); Solicitor General (1904); Attorney General (1904–1905); Lord Chancellor (1905–1912)	
	Henry Petty-Fitzmaurice, 5th Marquess of Lansdowne (1865–1927)	1863; Literae humanities	Balliol	Hereditary peerage (5 July 1866–3 June 1927); Lord Commissioner of the Treasury (1868–1872); Under-Secretary of State for War (1872–1874); Under-Secretary of State for India (1880); Governor General of Canada (1883–1888); Viceroy and Governor-General of India (1888–1894); War Secretary (1895–1900); Foreign Secretary (1900–1905); Leader of the House of Lords (1903–1905)	
	William Wickham (1831–1897)	1853	Balliol (B.A., 1853; M.A., 1857)	MP for Petersfield (1892–1897)	
	Arthur Peel, 1st Viscount Peel (1829–1912)	1848; Jurisprudence	Balliol	Liberal MP for Warwick (and Leamington) (1865–1895); Lord temporal (9 May 1895–24 October 1912); Speaker of the House of Commons (1884–1895)	
	Stafford Northcote (1818–1887)	1835; Jurisprudence	Balliol	Conservative MP for Dudley (1855–1857); MP for Stamford (1858–1866); MP for North Devon (1866–1885); Hereditary peerage (1885–12 January 1887); President of the Board of Trade (1866–1867); Secretary of State for India (1867–1868); Chancellor of the Exchequer (1874–1880); Leader of the Conservative Party (1876–1885); Leader of the House of Commons (1876–1880); First Lord of the Treasury (1885–1886); Foreign Secretary (1886–1887)	
	Edward Cardwell, 1st Viscount Cardwell	1831; Jurisprudence	Balliol (1835)	Liberal MP for Clitheroe (1842–1847); MP for Liverpool (1847–1852); MP for Oxford (1853–1874); Hereditary peerage (17 February 1874–15 February 1886); President of the Board of Trade (1852–1855); Chancellor of the Duchy of Lancaster (1861–1864); Secretary of State for the Colonies (1864–1866); Secretary of State for War (1868–1874)	

== Monarchs, statesmen, politicians and public servants in non-UK countries ==
Image	Name	Join Date	Country	Background	Politics	Refs
	Luke Bronin	2001	United States	Yale (BA, JD); Balliol (MS)	Mayor of Hartford, Connecticut (2016–2024); U.S. Representative - Connecticut 1 (2027–present)	
	Masako Owada	1988; International Relations	Japan	Harvard (BA)	Empress of Japan; College Visit July 2024	
	Ngaire Woods	1987; International Relations	New Zealand	University of Auckland (BA, LLB); Balliol (MPhil, PhD)	Founding dean of the Blavatnik School of Government; Professor of Global Economic Governance at the University of Oxford	
	Nada al-Nashif	1984; PPE	Jordan	Balliol (BA); Harvard (MPP)	Deputy High Commissioner for Human Rights (2020–present)	
	Elizabeth Sherwood-Randall	1981; International Relations	United States	Harvard (BA); Balliol (PhD)	U.S. Deputy Secretary of Energy (2014–2017); U.S. Homeland Security Advisor (2021–2025)	
	Nancy-Ann DeParle	1979; PPE	United States	University of Tennessee (BA); Balliol (BA); Harvard (JD)	Administrator of the Centers for Medicare & Medicaid Services (1997–2000); Director of the Office of Health Reform (2009–2011); Deputy Chief of Staff for Policy (2011–2013)	
	Christopher Dell	1978; International Relations	United States	Columbia (BA); Balliol (MPhil)	U.S. Ambassador to Angola (2001–2004); U.S. Ambassador to Zimbabwe (2004–2007); U.S. Ambassador to Kosovo (2009–2012)	
	Carson Wen	1975; Jurisprudence	Hong Kong	Columbia (BA); Balliol (BA, MA)	Hong Kong Deputy to the National People's Congress (1997–2012); Vice-Chairman of the Democratic Alliance for the Betterment and Progress of Hong Kong (2009–2011)	
	Kim Beazley	1974; International Relations	Australia	University of Western Australia (BA, MA); Balliol (MPhil)	MP for Swan (1980–1996); MP for Brand (1996–2007); Leader of the House (1988–1996); Deputy Prime Minister of Australia (1995–1996); Leader of the Opposition (1996–2001, 2005–2006); Governor of Western Australia (2018–2022)	
	Bob Rae	1969; Politics	Canada	University of Toronto (BA, LLB); Balliol (BPhil)	MP for Broadview-Greenwood (1978–1982); MPP for York South (1982–1996); MP for Toronto Centre (2008–2013); Premier of Ontario (1990–1995); Ambassador to the United Nations (2020–2025)	
	Abdullah Bishara	1961; Law	Kuwait	Cairo University (1959); St. John's University	Kuwait representative to the United Nations (1971–1981); Secretary-General of the Gulf Cooperation Council (1981–1993)	
	Harald V	1960; History, Economics, Politics	Norway	Norwegian Military Academy (1959)	King of Norway (1991–2026)	
	Matthew Nimetz	1960; PPE	United States	Williams College (BA; 1960); Balliol (BA-1962; MA-1966); Harvard (LLB; 1965)	Counselor of the U.S. Department of State (1977–1980); Under Secretary of State for International Security Affairs (1980); United Nations Special Representative for the naming dispute between Greece and the former Yugoslav Republic of Macedonia (now North Macedonia)	
	Lakshman Kadirgamar	1956; Law	British Ceylon; Sri Lanka	University of Ceylon (LLB; 1953); Balliol (BLitt; 1960)	Minister of Foreign Affairs of Sri Lanka (1994–2001; 2004–2005); Benefactor	
	Paul Sarbanes	1954; PPE	United States	Princeton (BA; 1954); Balliol (BA; 1957); Harvard (LLB; 1960)	Maryland House of Delegates - 2nd district (1967–1971); U.S. representative - Maryland 4 (1971–1973); U.S. representative - Maryland 3 (1973–1977); U.S. Senator from Maryland (1977–2007)	
	Tuanku Ja'afar	1951; Law	Federated Malay States; Malaysia	University of Nottingham (1947); Balliol; LSE	Ruler of Negeri Sembilan (1967–2008); King of Malaysia (1994–1999)	
	Sir Seretse Khama	1945	Bechuanaland Protectorate; Botswana	Fort Hare College (B.A., 1944); Balliol	Prime Minister of Bechuanaland (1965–1966); President of Botswana (1966–1980)	
	Eliud Mathu	1939; History	Kenya		First African member of the Legislative Council of Kenya (1944–1957)	
	Vincent Massey	1936; History	Canada	University College, Toronto (B.A., 1910); Balliol (M.A.)	Canadian Ambassador to the United States (1926–1930); High Commissioner of Canada to the United Kingdom (1935–1946); Governor General of Canada (1952–1959)	
	Philip Mayer Kaiser	1936; PPE	United States	University of Wisconsin (1935); Balliol	U.S. Ambassador to Senegal and Mauritania (1961–1964); U.S. Ambassador to Hungary (1977–1980); U.S. Ambassador to Austria (1980–1981)	
	Richard von Weizsäcker	1936; Philosophy and History	Germany	Balliol; University of Göttingen (Dr. jur.)	Mayor of West Berlin (1981–1984); President of Germany (1984–1994)	
	Adam von Trott zu Solz	1931; Politics	German Empire; Weimar Republic		Diplomat; Executed 1945 for his part in the 20 July plot to assassinate Hitler	
	James Burnham	1927; English	United States	Princeton; Balliol	Political theorist. Professor of Philosophy at NYU Leader of the American conservative movement Authored: The Managerial Revolution (1941); The Machiavellians (1943); Suicide of the West (1964)	
	Olav V	1924; Jurisprudence and economics	Norway	Norwegian Military Academy (1924); Balliol	King of Norway (1957–1991)	
	Jan Hofmeyr	1913; Literae Humaniores	South Africa	South African College (B.A., 1909 & 1910; M.A., 1911); Balliol	Administrator of the Transvaal (1924–1929); Minister of Finance and Education (1939–1948); Deputy Prime Minister (1943–1948)	
	Hardit Malik	1912; History	British Raj; India	Balliol (1915)	High Commissioner of India to Canada (1947–1949); Indian Ambassador to France (1949–1954, 1955–1956)	

== Colonial administrators ==
- Crawford Murray MacLehose Joined 1936. Diplomat: ambassador to South Vietnam 1967–9, to Denmark 1969–71, Governor of Hong Kong 1971-82 (longest serving ever) .Life peer 1982 (crossbench). Died 2000.
- Cyril George Fox Cartwright
- Sir Lionel Barnett Abrahams 1888 Senior civil servant, India Office
- Shyamji Krishna Varma 1879 India
- George Curzon, 1st Marquess Curzon of Kedleston 1878 viceroy of India
- Victor Bruce, 9th Earl of Elgin (c1867) viceroy of India
- Henry Primrose private secretary to the Viceroy of India, chair Inland Revenue
- Henry Petty-Fitzmaurice, 5th Marquess of Lansdowne 1863 listed as Lord Kerry viceroy of India
- Roger Ludlow 1609 (spelt Ludlowe) US Colonial lawmaker
