= Paul Goggins =

British politician (1953–2014)

The Right Honourable Paul Goggins MP

Minister of State for Northern Ireland
- In office 8 May 2007 – 11 May 2010
- Prime Minister: Tony Blair; Gordon Brown
- Preceded by: David Hanson
- Succeeded by: Hugo Swire

Member of Parliament for Wythenshawe and Sale East
- In office 1 May 1997 – 7 January 2014
- Preceded by: Constituency created
- Succeeded by: Mike Kane

Personal details
- Born: Paul Gerard Goggins; 16 June 1953 Manchester, England
- Died: 7 January 2014 (aged 60) Salford, England
- Party: Labour
- Spouse: Wyn Bartley (m. 1977)
- Children: 3
- Education: St Bede's College, Manchester
- Alma mater: UCE Birmingham; Manchester Metropolitan University
- Website: Official website

Paul Gerard Goggins (16 June 1953 – 7 January 2014) was a British Labour politician who served as Member of Parliament (MP) for Wythenshawe and Sale East from 1997 until his death in January 2014. He was also previously a Minister of State at the Northern Ireland Office.

== Early life ==
Paul Goggins was born in Manchester and educated at St Bede's College, before going on to study at the Roman Catholic seminary Ushaw College (1971–1973), although he did not enter the priesthood. He went on to study at the Birmingham Polytechnic (now Birmingham City University), receiving a Certificate in Residential Care of Children and Young People in 1976. Later, he earned a Certificate of Qualification in Social Work from the Manchester Polytechnic in 1982.

He worked as a child care worker with the 'Liverpool Catholic Social Services' for a year in 1974, before becoming an officer in charge at the Wigan Children's Home in 1976. He was appointed as project director for the NCH Action for Children in Salford in 1984. He became the national director for Church Action on Poverty, a national church-based campaigning organisation, in 1989 where he remained until his election to Westminster.

== Political career ==
He served as a councillor in the City of Salford from 1990 to 1998. He was elected to the House of Commons at the 1997 general election for the newly created Wythenshawe and Sale East seat vacated by the retirement of Alf Morris, the former Labour MP for Manchester Wythenshawe. Goggins held the safe Labour seat with a majority of 15,019 and remained the MP there for almost 17 years. He made his maiden speech on 20 May 1997.

He served on the social security select committee from 1997 until he was appointed as the Parliamentary Private Secretary (PPS) to Minister of State at the Department of Social Security John Denham in 1998, moving with Denham to the Department of Health in 1999.

In 2000 he was appointed PPS to the Secretary of State for Education and Employment David Blunkett, and he remained Blunketts's PPS following the 2001 General Election in his new position as Home Secretary. It is during this period that, according to Blunkett, Goggins was lumbered with the nickname 'Mrs Goggins'.

He was promoted to the government of Tony Blair in 2003, where he was made the Parliamentary Under Secretary of State at the Home Office with the role of prisons and probation minister. He became the parliamentary under Secretary for State with responsibility for the voluntary and community sector. He forged links with various community and voluntary sector organisations such as ARVAC The Association for Research in the Voluntary and Community Sector. In May 2006, he was appointed as a junior minister at the Northern Ireland Office. He was the co-founder of the All Party Parliamentary Friends of CAFOD group and was Secretary of the All Party Parliamentary Group on poverty.

In February 2013, Goggins voted against the second reading of the Marriage (Same Sex Couples) Act 2013. Subsequently, in May 2013 the MP voted against the bill’s third and final reading, opposing the legalisation of same-sex marriage within England and Wales.

== Personal life and death ==
He married Wyn Bartley in 1977 in Crosby and they had two sons and a daughter.

He was a season ticket holder at Manchester City F.C. He was also a member of the Christian socialist movement who broadcast on the BBC Radio 4 Thought for the Day slot on the Today programme. In an interview on BBC Radio 5 Live in 2004, he claimed his family was the inspiration for the "Mrs Goggins" character in the Postman Pat series.

On 30 December 2013, Goggins became seriously ill after collapsing while running, resulting in emergency surgery. He died in Salford Royal Hospital on 7 January 2014 following complications from a brain haemorrhage, having never regained consciousness.

Parliament of the United Kingdom
| New constituency | Member of Parliament for Wythenshawe and Sale East; 1997–2014 | Succeeded by Mike Kane |
