= Wythenshawe and Sale East =

UK Parliament constituency (since 1997)

Coordinates: 53°25′N 2°16′W

- Borough constituency for the House of Commons
- Interactive map of boundaries since 2010
- Location within North West England
- County: Greater Manchester
- Electorate: 76,971 (March 2020)

Current constituency
- Created: 1997
- Member of Parliament: Mike Kane (Labour)
- Seats: One
- Created from: Manchester Wythenshawe, Altrincham and Sale, Davyhulme

Wythenshawe and Sale East is a parliamentary constituency in the city of Manchester and the borough of Trafford. It returns one Member of Parliament (MP) to the House of Commons of the Parliament of the United Kingdom, elected by the first past the post system.

Wythenshawe and Sale East borders rural Cheshire to the south, and its southern tip includes Manchester Airport. The constituency has always been a safe Labour seat; the current MP is Mike Kane, who was elected at the 2014 by-election in February 2014. He succeeded Paul Goggins, who died in January 2014 having held the seat for Labour since its inception in 1997.

== Boundaries ==
1997–2010: The City of Manchester wards of Baguley, Benchill, Brooklands, Northenden, Sharston, and Woodhouse Park, and the Metropolitan Borough of Trafford wards of Brooklands, Priory, and Sale Moor.

2010–present: The City of Manchester wards of Baguley, Brooklands, Northenden, Sharston and Woodhouse Park, and the Metropolitan Borough of Trafford wards of Brooklands, Priory^{1}, and Sale Moor.

^{1} Renamed Sale Central following a local government boundary review in Trafford which became effective in May 2023.

The 2023 review of Westminster constituencies, which was based on the ward structure in place at 1 December 2020, left the boundaries unchanged.

The constituency of Wythenshawe and Sale East is one of three in the Metropolitan Borough of Trafford and one of six in the City of Manchester, encompassing three of the five electoral wards in Sale and all five wards of Wythenshawe. The constituency was created at the 1997 general election, combining all of the former Manchester Wythenshawe constituency with parts of Sale from the Altrincham and Sale and Davyhulme constituencies.

== Constituency profile ==
The seat broadly comprises two very contrasting areas – the massive post-war built council estate in Wythenshawe (which once was the biggest in Europe), eight miles south of Manchester city centre, and the eastern half of the more suburban, middle-class and affluent Sale, particularly in Brooklands, the constituency's biggest Tory ward. However, the Brooklands ward in Manchester is currently held by Labour, as are other areas around Wythenshawe such as Woodhouse Park, Baguley and Sharston, with the Priory and Sale Moor wards from Trafford also usually inclined to Labour. The southernmost Woodhouse Park ward is the largest in size as it contains mostly uninhabited land at Manchester Airport alongside the parish of Ringway, and there are green spaces at Sale Water Park and the park around the Tudor-era manor house Wythenshawe Hall.

The Wythenshawe area has historically suffered from some severe social and economic problems; in the Index of Multiple Deprivation 2000, the former ward of Benchill was assessed as the most deprived in the country.

== Members of Parliament ==
Elections	Member	Party
1997	Paul Goggins	Labour
2014 by-election	Mike Kane	Labour

== Elections ==
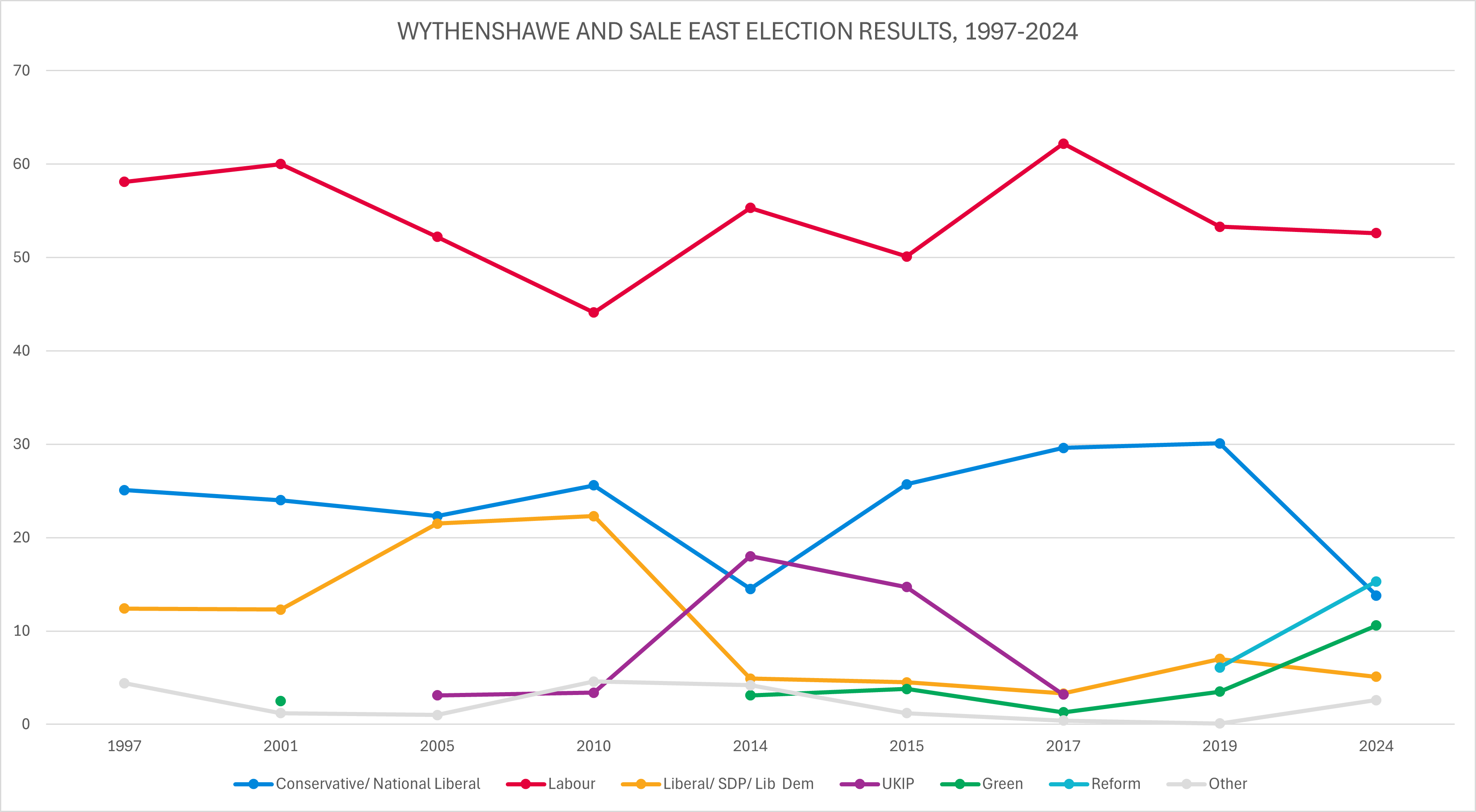
Election results 1997-2024

=== Elections in the 2020s ===
General election 2024: Wythenshawe and Sale East
Party	Candidate	Votes	%	±%
Labour	Mike Kane	20,596	52.6	▼0.7
Reform	Julie Fousert	5,986	15.3	▲9.2
Conservative	Sarah Beament	5,392	13.8	▼16.2
Green	Melanie Earp	4,133	10.6	▲7.1
Liberal Democrats	Simon Lepori	1,985	5.1	▼1.9
Workers Party	John Barstow	714	1.8	new
SDP	Hilary Salt	326	0.8	new
Majority		14,610	37.3	▲14.1
Turnout		39,132	50.3	▼7.9
Registered electors		77,765		
Labour hold		Swing	▼5.0	

=== Elections in the 2010s ===
General election 2019: Wythenshawe and Sale East
Party	Candidate	Votes	%	±%
Labour	Mike Kane	23,855	53.3	−8.9
Conservative	Peter Harrop	13,459	30.1	+0.5
Liberal Democrats	Simon Lepori	3,111	7.0	+3.7
Brexit Party	Julie Fousert	2,717	6.1	N/A
Green	Robert Nunney	1,559	3.5	+2.2
Communist League	Caroline Bellamy	58	0.1	N/A
Majority		10,396	23.2	−9.4
Turnout		44,759	58.8	−1.2
Labour hold		Swing	−4.7	

General election 2017: Wythenshawe and Sale East
Party	Candidate	Votes	%	±%
Labour	Mike Kane	28,525	62.2	+12.1
Conservative	Fiona Green	13,581	29.6	+3.9
Liberal Democrats	William Jones	1,504	3.3	−1.2
UKIP	Mike Bayley-Sanderson	1,475	3.2	−11.5
Green	Dan Jerrome	576	1.3	−2.5
Independent	Luckson Augustine	185	0.4	N/A
Majority		14,944	32.6	+8.2
Turnout		45,846	60.0	+3.1
Labour hold		Swing	+4.1	

General election 2015: Wythenshawe and Sale East
Party	Candidate	Votes	%	±%
Labour	Mike Kane	21,693	50.1	+6.0
Conservative	Fiona Green	11,124	25.7	+0.1
UKIP	Lee Clayton	6,354	14.7	+11.3
Liberal Democrats	Victor Chamberlain	1,927	4.5	−17.8
Green	Jess Mayo	1,658	3.8	N/A
Monster Raving Loony	Johnny Disco	292	0.7	N/A
TUSC	Lynn Worthington	215	0.5	−0.2
Majority		10,569	24.4	+5.9
Turnout		43,263	56.9	+2.6
Labour hold		Swing	+3.0	

By-election 13 February 2014: Wythenshawe and Sale East
Party	Candidate	Votes	%	±%
Labour	Mike Kane	13,261	55.3	+11.2
UKIP	John Bickley	4,301	18.0	+14.6
Conservative	Daniel Critchlow	3,479	14.5	−11.1
Liberal Democrats	Mary Di Mauro	1,176	4.9	−17.4
Green	Nigel Woodcock	748	3.1	N/A
BNP	Eddy O'Sullivan	708	3.0	−0.9
Monster Raving Loony	Captain Chaplington-Smythe	288	1.2	N/A
Majority		8,960	37.3	+18.8
Turnout		23,961	28.0	−26.3
Labour hold		Swing		

General election 2010: Wythenshawe and Sale East
Party	Candidate	Votes	%	±%
Labour	Paul Goggins	17,987	44.1	−8.0
Conservative	Janet Clowes	10,412	25.6	+3.3
Liberal Democrats	Martin Eakins	9,107	22.3	+0.9
BNP	Bernard Todd	1,572	3.9	N/A
UKIP	Christopher Cassidy	1,405	3.4	+0.4
TUSC	Lynn Worthington	268	0.7	−0.3
Majority		7,575	18.5	−11.4
Turnout		40,751	54.3	+3.1
Labour hold		Swing	−5.9	

This is compared to Worthington's performance as the Socialist Alternative candidate at the prior election.

=== Elections in the 2000s ===
General election 2005: Wythenshawe and Sale East
Party	Candidate	Votes	%	±%
Labour	Paul Goggins	18,878	52.2	−7.8
Conservative	Jane Meehan	8,051	22.3	−1.7
Liberal Democrats	Alison Firth	7,766	21.5	+9.2
UKIP	William Ford	1,120	3.1	N/A
Socialist	Lynn Worthington	369	1.0	N/A
Majority		10,827	29.9	−6.1
Turnout		36,184	50.4	+1.8
Labour hold		Swing	−3.0	

General election 2001: Wythenshawe and Sale East
Party	Candidate	Votes	%	±%
Labour	Paul Goggins	21,032	60.0	+1.9
Conservative	Susan Fildes	8,424	24.0	−1.1
Liberal Democrats	Yasmin Zalzala	4,320	12.3	−0.1
Green	Lance Crookes	869	2.5	N/A
Socialist Labour	Fred Shaw	410	1.2	−0.9
Majority		12,608	36.0	+3.0
Turnout		35,055	48.6	−14.6
Labour hold		Swing	+1.5	

=== Elections in the 1990s ===
General election 1997: Wythenshawe and Sale East
Party	Candidate	Votes	%	±%
Labour	Paul Goggins	26,448	58.1	+8.6
Conservative	Paul Fleming	11,429	25.1	−9.8
Liberal Democrats	Vanessa Tucker	5,639	12.4	−2.1
Referendum	Brian Stanyer	1,060	2.3	N/A
Socialist Labour	Jim Flannery	957	2.1	N/A
Majority		15,019	33.0	+18.4
Turnout		45,533	63.2	
Labour hold		Swing	+9.2	

== See also ==
- Parliamentary constituencies in Greater Manchester
