= 2014 Wythenshawe and Sale East by-election =

UK parliamentary by-election

- 13 February 2014

Wythenshawe and Sale East constituency
- Turnout: 28.2%
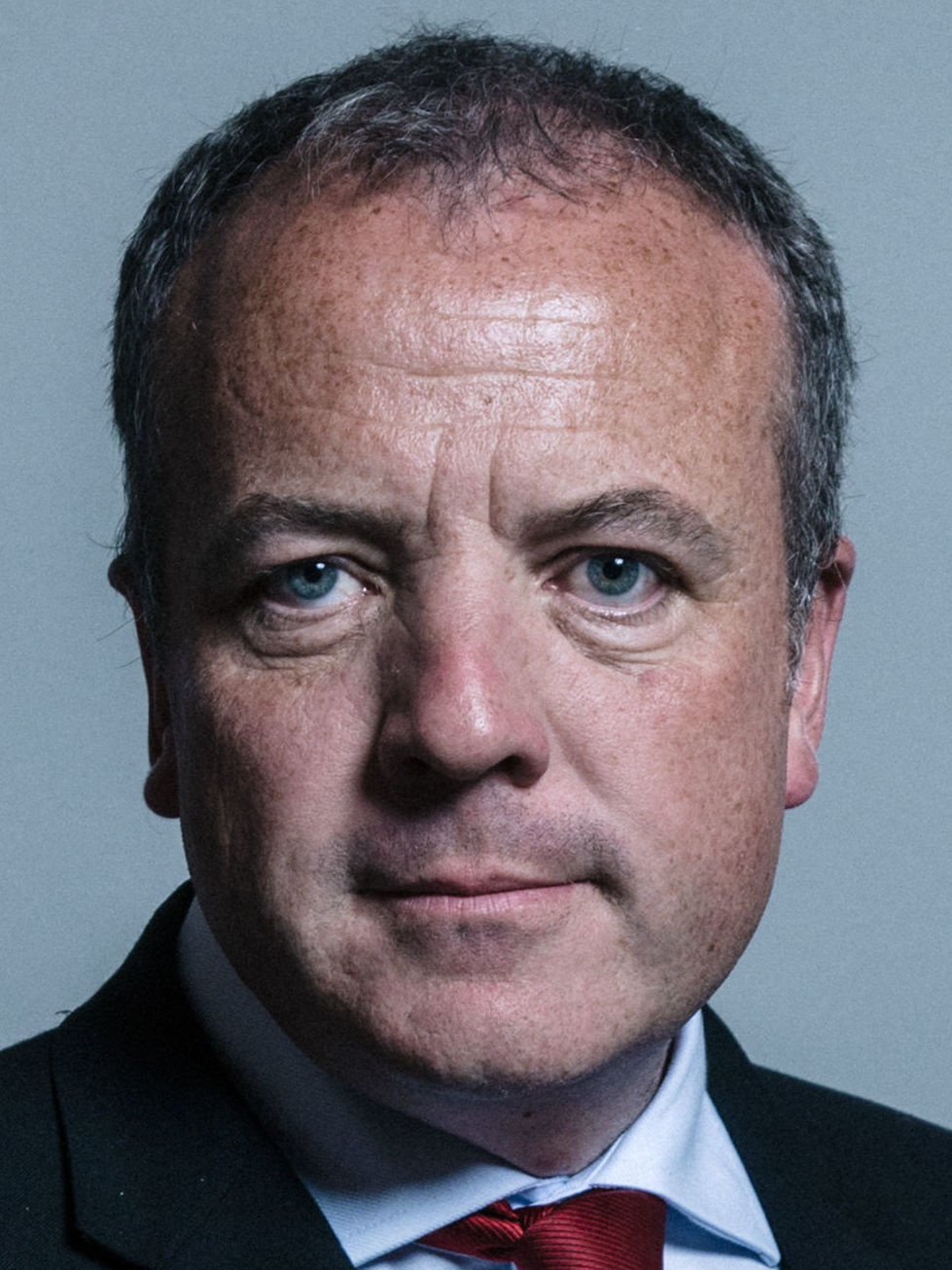

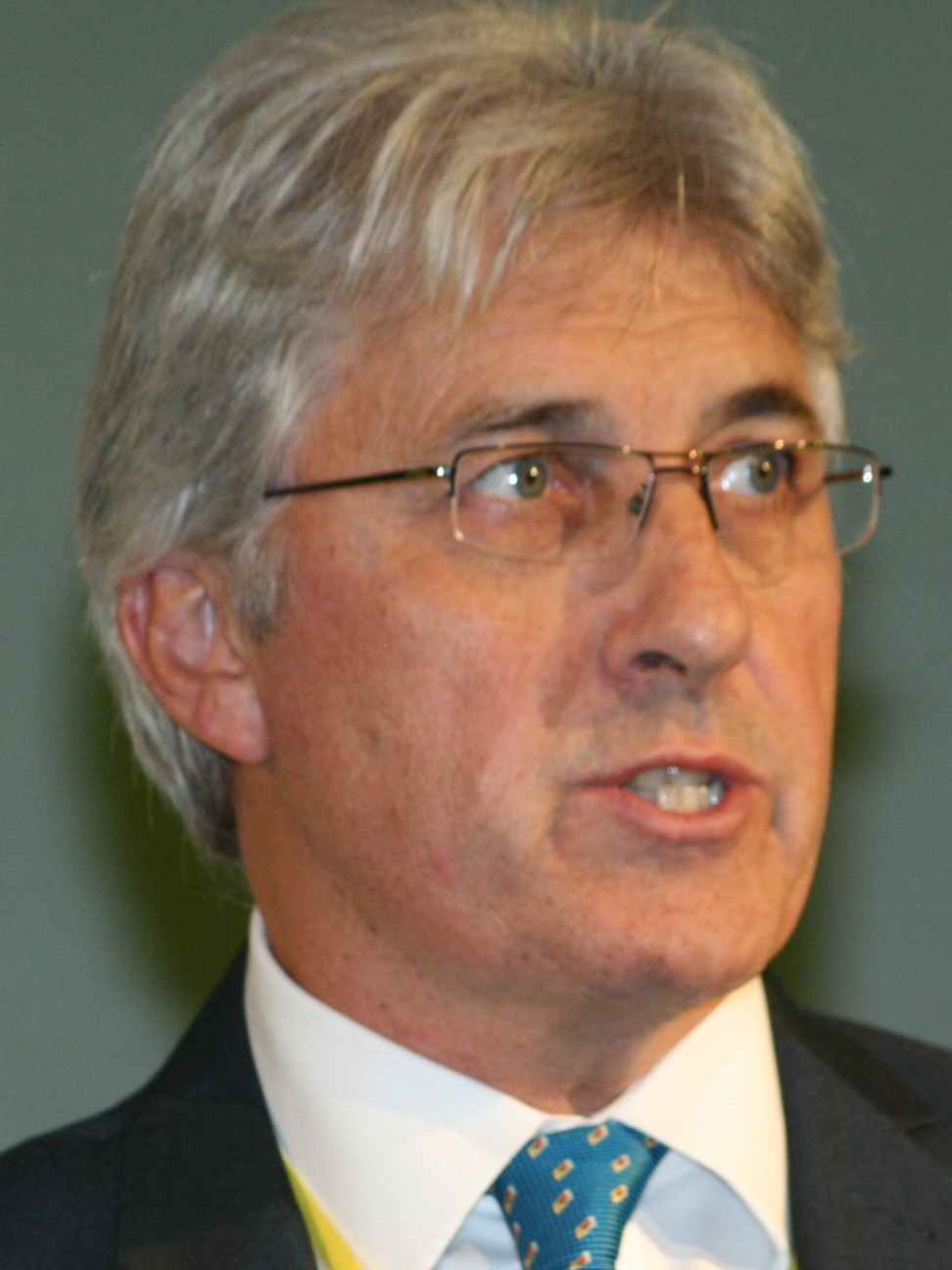
	First party	Second party	Third party
			Con
Candidate	Mike Kane	John Bickley	Daniel Critchlow
Party	Labour	UKIP	Conservative
Popular vote	13,261	4,301	3,479
Percentage	55.3%	18.0%	14.5%
Swing	▲11.2 pp	▲14.5 pp	▼11.0 pp
MP before election
Paul Goggins
Labour
Subsequent MP
Mike Kane
Labour

A by-election for the United Kingdom parliamentary constituency of Wythenshawe and Sale East was held on 13 February 2014, following the death of incumbent Labour Party MP Paul Goggins. The election was won by Labour candidate Mike Kane with a greatly increased share of the vote.

The UK Independence Party (UKIP) came second with a large increase in vote share, having previously performed underwhelmingly in the seat. Both governing parties performed poorly: the Conservative Party fell to third place, and the Liberal Democrats lost their deposit.

== Background ==
On 30 December 2013, Goggins became seriously ill after collapsing while running. He died in hospital on 7 January 2014 following complications from a brain haemorrhage.

== Result ==
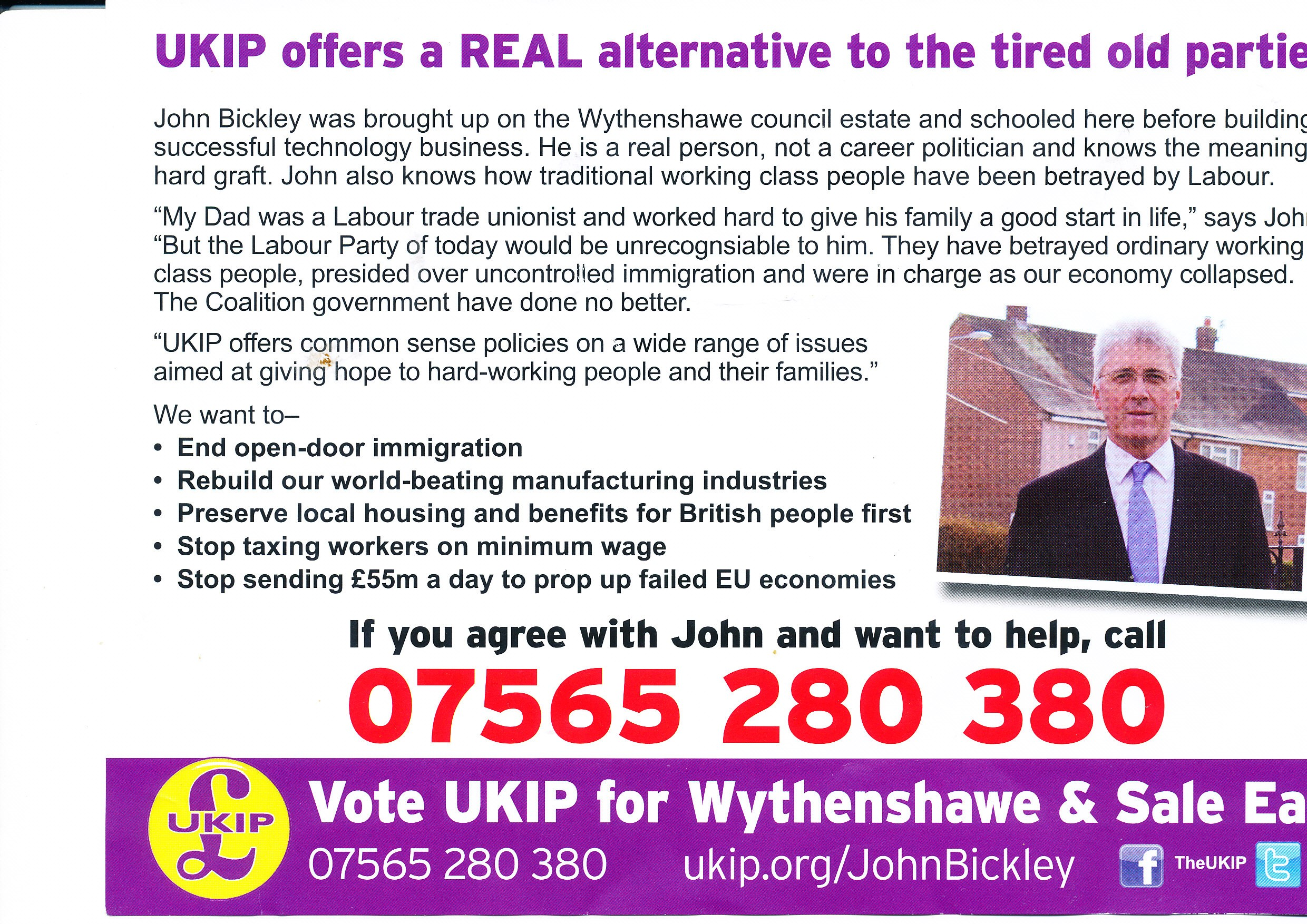
John Bickley leaflet

Applications to register to vote had to be received by Manchester City Council by 28 January. The Statement of Persons Nominated was published at 5 pm on 29 January 2014.

The result was declared at around 2.30am GMT on Friday, 14 February.

Election	Political result	Candidate	Party	Votes	%	±%
By-election 2014; Turnout: 23,961 (28.2%) –26.1	Labour hold Majority: 8,960 (37.4%) +18.8; Swing: +1.6% from Lab to UKIP	Mike Kane	Labour	13,261	55.3	+11.2
By-election 2014; Turnout: 23,961 (28.2%) –26.1	Labour hold Majority: 8,960 (37.4%) +18.8; Swing: +1.6% from Lab to UKIP	John Bickley	UKIP	4,301	18.0	+14.5
By-election 2014; Turnout: 23,961 (28.2%) –26.1	Labour hold Majority: 8,960 (37.4%) +18.8; Swing: +1.6% from Lab to UKIP	Daniel Critchlow	Conservative	3,479	14.5	–11.0
By-election 2014; Turnout: 23,961 (28.2%) –26.1	Labour hold Majority: 8,960 (37.4%) +18.8; Swing: +1.6% from Lab to UKIP	Mary di Mauro	Liberal Democrats	1,176	4.9	–17.4
By-election 2014; Turnout: 23,961 (28.2%) –26.1	Labour hold Majority: 8,960 (37.4%) +18.8; Swing: +1.6% from Lab to UKIP	Nigel Woodcock	Green	748	3.1	New
By-election 2014; Turnout: 23,961 (28.2%) –26.1	Labour hold Majority: 8,960 (37.4%) +18.8; Swing: +1.6% from Lab to UKIP	Eddy O'Sullivan	BNP	708	3.0	–0.9
By-election 2014; Turnout: 23,961 (28.2%) –26.1	Labour hold Majority: 8,960 (37.4%) +18.8; Swing: +1.6% from Lab to UKIP	Captain Chaplington-Smythe	Monster Raving Loony	288	1.2	New

Mike Kane, a former Manchester councillor and the acting chief executive of Movement for Change, was confirmed as the Labour Party candidate, on 24 January. In a selection process described as "quick-fire", London interviews on 22 January produced a short list of five local councillors and ex-councillors: Rosa Battle and Suzannah Reeves of Manchester City Council, Catherine Hynes and Sophie Taylor of Trafford Borough, and Mike Kane.

The Wythenshawe branch of the Conservative Party chose Daniel Critchlow, a Trafford-based vicar, on 23 January 2014.

The Liberal Democrats chose a Manchester City councillor, Mary di Mauro, on 26 January 2014.

On 24 January 2014, the British National Party announced Eddy O'Sullivan as its candidate. O'Sullivan had been a candidate in Salford local elections and stood for the BNP at the 2012 Manchester Central by-election, where his party's share of the vote was reduced.

The UK Independence Party selected John Bickley, 60, a former Labour supporter who grew up in Wythenshawe. Bickley, who runs a mobile app firm, told The Guardian that he felt Parliament needed to "take responsibility" having "outsourced running of the country to the EU". Bickley added that he felt "Labour had let down the working class" and that Labour's behaviour would mean his former trade unionist father would be "turning in his grave".

The Green Party selected Nigel Woodcock, a further education lecturer at The Manchester College.

The Official Monster Raving Loony Party put forward Captain Chaplington-Smythe as its candidate on 25 January 2014.

== Polling ==
Date(s) conducted	Polling organisation/client	Sample size	Lab	UKIP	Con	LD	Others	Lead
13 Feb 2014	Wythenshawe by-election Result	23,961	55.3%	18.0%	14.5%	4.9%	7.3%	37.3%
3–5 Feb 2014	Lord Ashcroft	1,009	61%	15%	14%	5%	4%	46%
6 May 2010	General Election Results	40,751	44.1%	3.4%	25.6%	22.3%	4.6%	18.6%

== Previous result ==
Election	Political result	Candidate	Party	Votes	%	±%
General election 2010; Turnout: 40,751 (54.3%) +3.1	Labour hold Majority: 7,575 (18.6%); Swing: -5.9% from Lab to Con	Paul Goggins	Labour	17,987	44.1	–8.0
General election 2010; Turnout: 40,751 (54.3%) +3.1	Labour hold Majority: 7,575 (18.6%); Swing: -5.9% from Lab to Con	Janet Clowes	Conservative	10,412	25.6	+3.3
General election 2010; Turnout: 40,751 (54.3%) +3.1	Labour hold Majority: 7,575 (18.6%); Swing: -5.9% from Lab to Con	Martin Eakins	Liberal Democrats	9,107	22.3	+0.9
General election 2010; Turnout: 40,751 (54.3%) +3.1	Labour hold Majority: 7,575 (18.6%); Swing: -5.9% from Lab to Con	Bernard Todd	BNP	1,572	3.9	New
General election 2010; Turnout: 40,751 (54.3%) +3.1	Labour hold Majority: 7,575 (18.6%); Swing: -5.9% from Lab to Con	Christopher Cassidy	UKIP	1,405	3.4	+0.4
General election 2010; Turnout: 40,751 (54.3%) +3.1	Labour hold Majority: 7,575 (18.6%); Swing: -5.9% from Lab to Con	Lynn Worthington	TUSC	268	0.7	–0.3^{1}

^{1}This is compared to Worthington's performance as the Socialist Alternative candidate at the prior election.

== See also ==
- List of United Kingdom by-elections
