= Mike Kane =

British Labour politician (born 1969)

Mike Kane MP
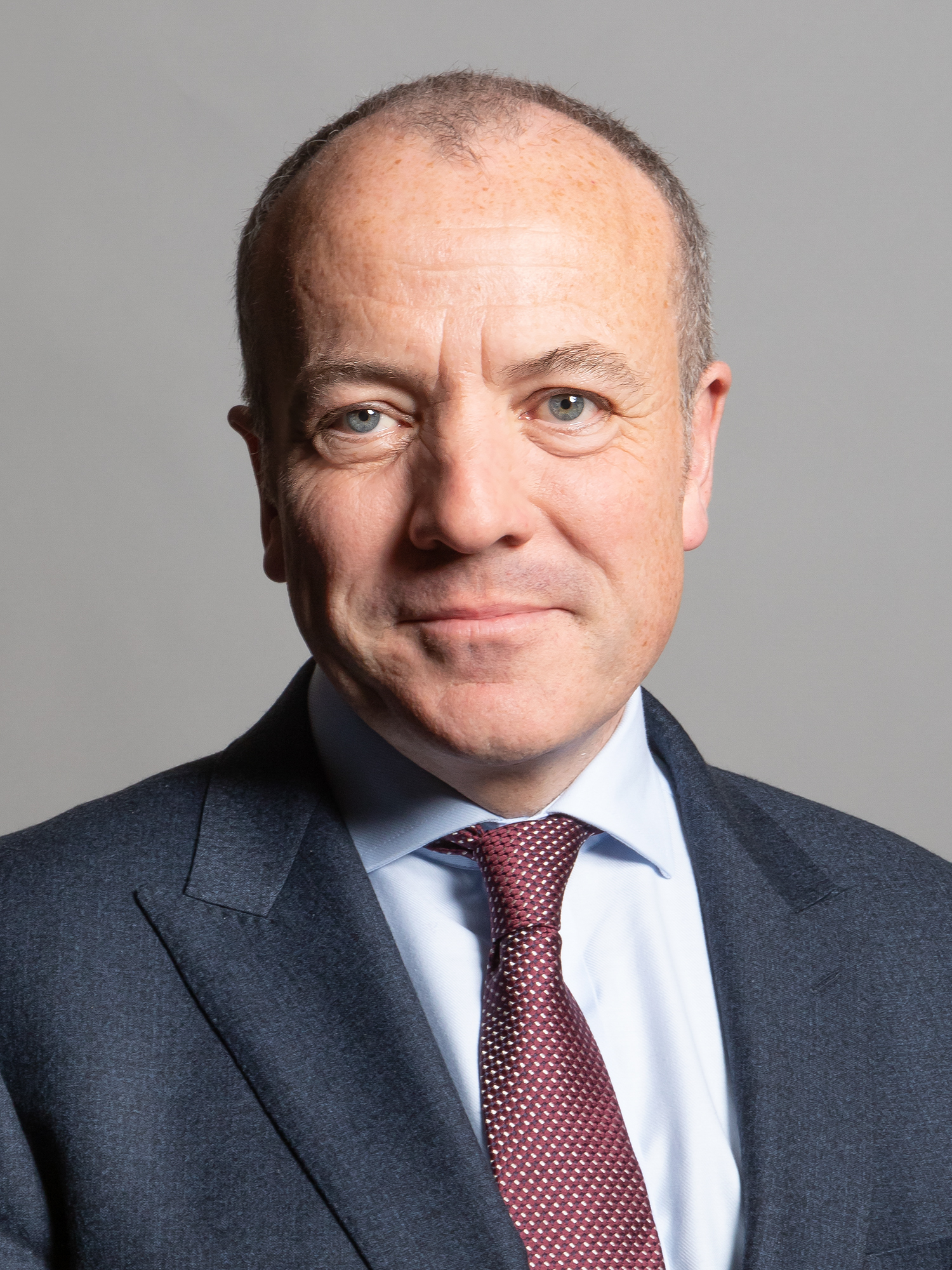
- Official portrait, 2020

Parliamentary Under-Secretary of State for Aviation, Maritime and Security
- In office 9 July 2024 – 6 September 2025
- Prime Minister: Keir Starmer
- Preceded by: The Lord Davies of Gower
- Succeeded by: Keir Mather

Member of Parliament for Wythenshawe and Sale East
- Incumbent
- Assumed office 13 February 2014
- Preceded by: Paul Goggins
- Majority: 14,610 (37.3%)

Member of Manchester City Council for Northenden
- In office 2 May 1991 – 1 May 2008
- Preceded by: Anne Carroll
- Succeeded by: Martin Eakins

Personal details
- Born: Michael Joseph Patrick Kane; 9 January 1969 (age 57) Wythenshawe, Manchester, England
- Party: Labour
- Spouse: Sandra Bracegirdle (m. 1996)
- Education: Manchester Metropolitan University (BA, PGCE)
- Occupation: Politician; teacher
- Website: Official website

Michael Joseph Patrick Kane (born 9 January 1969) is a British politician. A member of the Labour Party, Kane has served as Member of Parliament (MP) for Wythenshawe and Sale East since 2014.

He served as a Parliamentary Under-Secretary of State for Transport from July 2024 to September 2025.

== Early life and career ==
Michael Kane was born on 9 January 1969 in Wythenshawe. He was born to Joseph and Kathleen (née McGirl) Kane, both Irish immigrants who migrated separately to Manchester in 1955.

He attended St Aidan's Primary School in Northern Moor, moving on to St Paul's RC High School in Newall Green before studying for his A Levels at Loreto College, Hulme, Manchester. He graduated from Manchester Metropolitan University with a BA in Social Sciences in 1997 and a PGCE in 1999.

After university, Kane was a primary school teacher at Springfield Primary School in Sale.

== Political career ==
Kane joined the Labour Party at 18. He has described himself as a "Blairite"

In 1991 he was elected to Manchester City Council in Northenden ward, gaining his seat from the Conservatives (the sitting councillor stood as an Independent Conservative against her replacement, but Kane had more votes than both put together). He was re-elected in 1995, 1999, 2003 and 2004. Kane was appointed Executive Member for Arts and Leisure in 2007. When his was up for re-election in 2008, he was defeated by eight votes, losing to the Liberal Democrat candidate.

Kane worked behind the scenes for several politicians, including as office manager for Jonathan Reynolds, MP for Stalybridge and Hyde. He was also a parliamentary assistant to Reynolds and James Purnell, the previous MP for Stalybridge and Hyde. He worked for Tameside Council as a Senior Executive Assistant based in the council leader's office.

In July 2013, Kane became the acting chief executive of Movement for Change, an organisation set up by David Miliband to run local political campaigns and train organisers. Kane had backed David Miliband in the 2010 Labour leadership election.

== Parliamentary career ==
On 24 January 2014, Kane was selected as the Labour candidate for the 2014 Wythenshawe and Sale East by-election. He was elected as MP for Wythenshawe and Sale East with 55.3% of the vote and a majority of 8,960.

At the 2015 general election, Kane was re-elected as MP for Wythenshawe and Sale East with a decreased vote share of 50.1% and a decreased majority of 10,569. Whilst he did nominate Liz Kendall, Kane then supported Owen Smith in the failed attempt to replace Jeremy Corbyn in the 2016 Labour leadership election. In October 2016, Labour leader Jeremy Corbyn appointed Kane to the Shadow Cabinet as Shadow Minister for Education with responsibility for Schools.

In February 2017, he posed how education could be improved by making schools more democratic and accountable to parents, stating: "To coin a phrase, we need to give them back some control ...we can't have 24,000 schools run from the Department for Education...the schools commissioner regions are too large."

Kane was again re-elected at the snap 2017 general election, with an increased vote share of 62.2% and an increased majority of 14,944. He was again re-elected at the 2019 general election, with a decreased vote share of 53.3% and a decreased majority of 10,396.

=== Shadow minister for aviation and maritime ===
From April 2020 to May 2024, Kane was shadow minister for aviation and maritime. In October 2021, Kane proposed the "Amess Amendment" following the death of Sir David Amess, highlighting to parliament that "Catholics believe that extreme unction helps guide the soul to God after death, so maybe we could come up with an Amess amendment so that no matter where it is, in a care home or at a crime scene, members, or anybody, can receive that sacrament.". Formally, this amendment will ensure access for Catholic priests to administer the last rites, including at crime scenes.

In March 2022, amidst P&O's controversial sacking of 800 workers, Kane affirmed his support for their "workforce reinstated and legal action taken against P&O", and in addition, for the practice of "fire and rehire" to be outlawed. This practice involves an employer dismissing a worker and rehiring them on new, less-favourable terms.

=== Minister of maritime, aviation and security ===
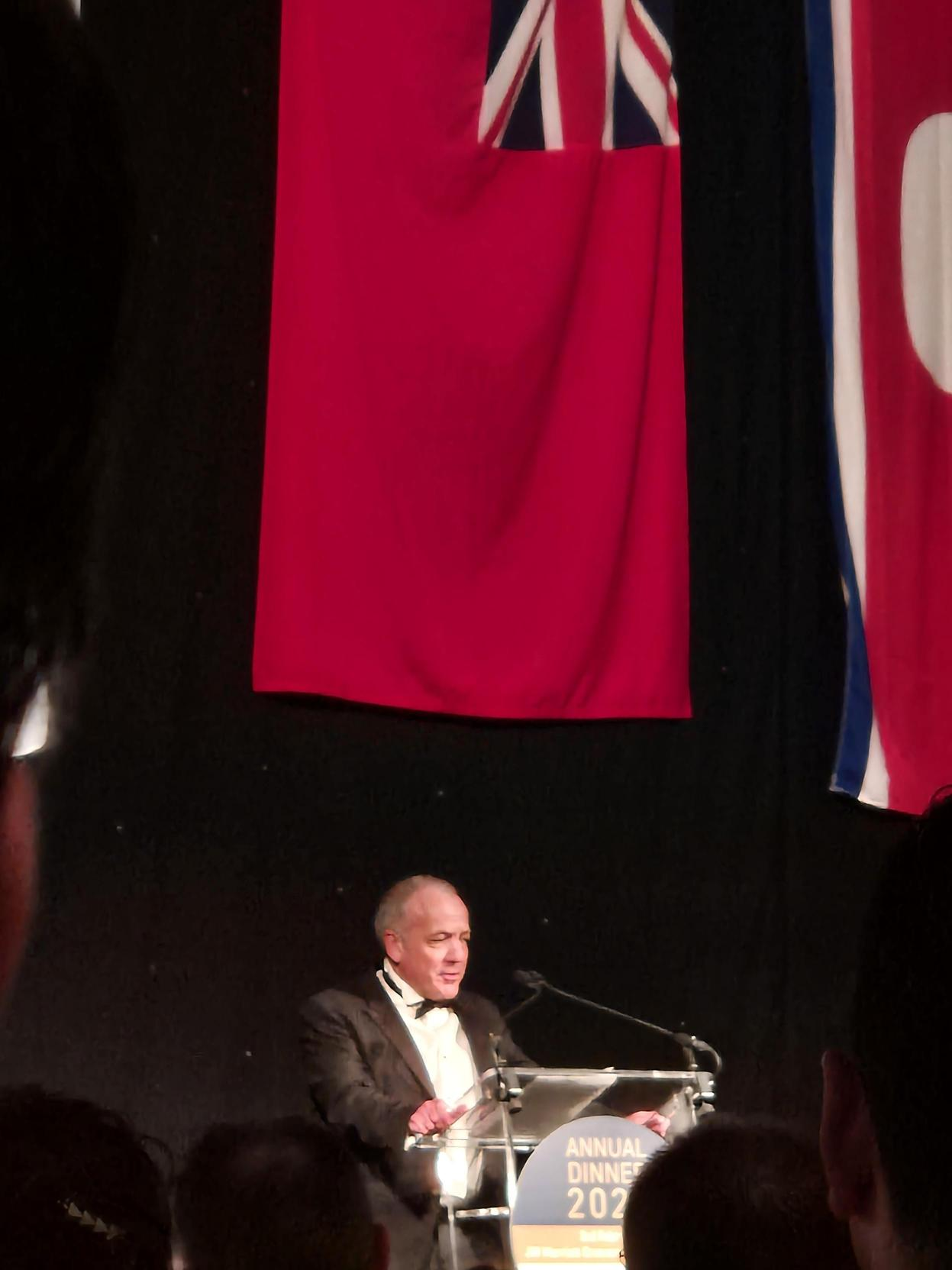
Mike Kane at the 2025 UK Chamber of Shipping Annual Dinner

At the 2024 general election, Kane was again re-elected, with a decreased vote share of 52.6% and an increased majority of 14,610.

On 11 July 2024, Kane was appointed as Parliamentary Under-Secretary of State for Transport at the Department for Transport with responsibility as minister for maritime, aviation and security.

In September 2024 at Cranfield University Kane advocated for a modernised airspace system in the UK to ease delays and support decarbonisation. In December 2024, Kane debated in parliament the safety considerations around the vessel 'MV Ruby', a ship that called at the UK after it was damaged in rough weather while carrying a potentially explosive cargo of ammonium nitrate.

In February 2025, Kane gave the keynote address at the 2025 UK Chamber of Shipping Annual Dinner at the Grosvenor House Hotel in London.

== Personal life ==
Kane married Sandra Bracegirdle in 1996, who he later served alongside on Manchester City Council. He is a Roman Catholic.

He plays a number of wind instruments including the uilleann pipes, bagpipes and the flute. He is a Manchester City season ticket holder. His favourite subject to teach was creative writing. When asked about his favourite book, he replied "War of the Worlds" and "The Ragged-Trousered Philanthropists".

=== Affiliations ===
Kane is a member of Labour Friends of Israel.

Parliament of the United Kingdom
Preceded by Paul Goggins	Member of Parliament for Wythenshawe and Sale East; 2014–present	Incumbent
