= Lord's tube station =

Former railway station in England

Lord's
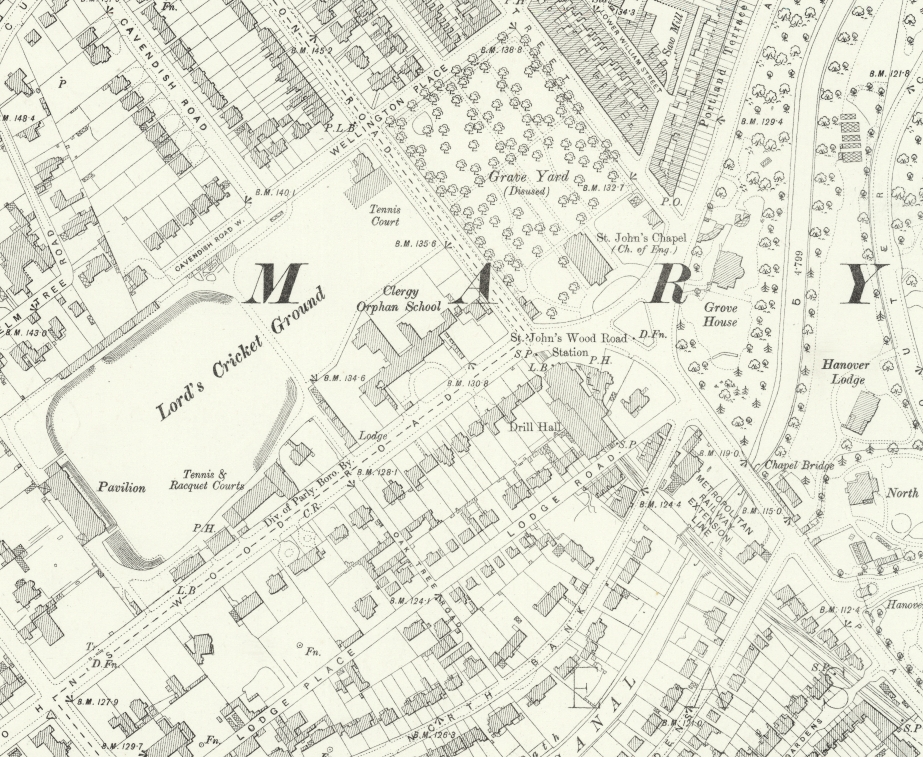
- Interactive map of Lord's

General information
- Location: St John's Wood
- Owner: Metropolitan Railway
- Number of platforms: 2

Key dates
- 13 April 1868: Opened as St. John's Wood Road
- 1 April 1925: Rebuilt; renamed St. John's Wood
- 11 June 1939: Renamed Lord's
- 20 November 1939: Closed
- Replaced by: St John's Wood

Other information
- Coordinates: 51°31′48″N 0°10′09″W

Lord's was a London Underground station located in St John's Wood, north-west London.

It was opened in 1868 by the Metropolitan Railway on its Metropolitan and St John's Wood Railway line, which is now part of the Underground's Metropolitan line. It was known by several different names throughout its history; by the time of its closure in 1939 its name was taken from the nearby Lord's Cricket Ground.

== History ==
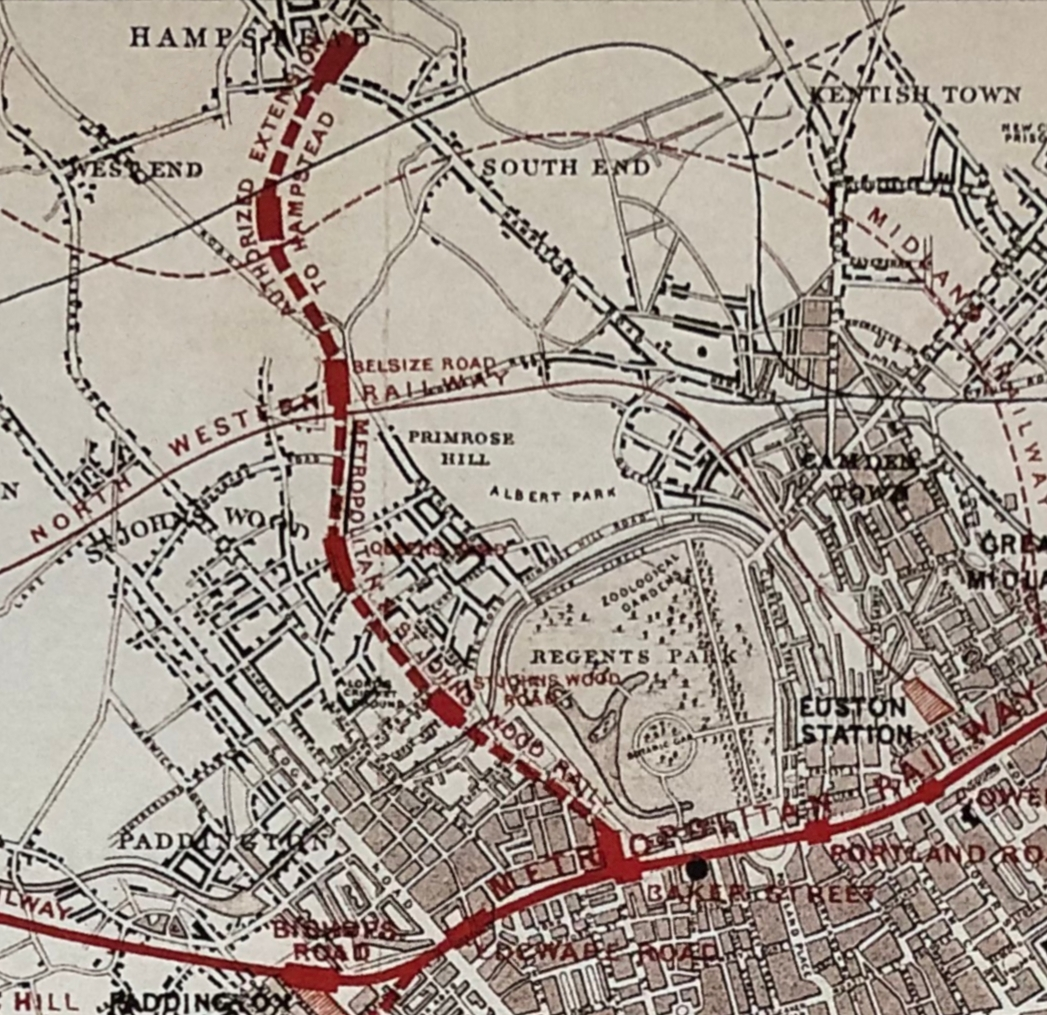
Metropolitan & St John's Wood Railway between Baker Street and Hampstead from a Metropolitan Railway map, circa 1867 (full map)

The station was opened on 13 April 1868 as St. John's Wood Road. It was on the Metropolitan and St John's Wood Railway, the first northward branch extension from Baker Street to Swiss Cottage of the Metropolitan Railway (MR), the precursor of today's Metropolitan line. The station was located at the junction of St. John's Wood Road, Wellington Road and Park Road.

The original station building was cramped and unable to cope with peak demand during matches at the nearby Lord's Cricket Ground. It was demolished and reconstructed in 1924–25, to a design by the MR's architect Charles W. Clark, with a larger building that enclosed the space above the platforms with a concrete slab to form a parking garage under the original glazed platform roof. Upon reopening, the station's name was shortened to St. John's Wood on 1 April 1925. It was renamed again, as Lord's, on 11 June 1939.

In the mid-1930s the Metropolitan line was suffering congestion at the south end of its main route, where trains from its many branches shared the limited capacity between Finchley Road and Baker Street. To ease this congestion, deep-level tunnels were built between Finchley Road station and the Bakerloo line tunnels at Baker Street station. On 20 November 1939, the Metropolitan line's service to Stanmore was transferred to the Bakerloo line and diverted to Baker Street via the new tunnels. A new Bakerloo line station named St John's Wood was opened to replace Lord's station. It had been the intention of the Underground's management to close Lord's station to normal services, but retain it for temporary use during top-class cricket matches; the advent of the Second World War led this plan to be abandoned, and the station closed permanently after the last train on 19 November 1939.

The surface building survived until the late 1960s, when it was demolished. The site is now occupied by a hotel. An emergency access point existed as of 2004 and a stairwell went to a piece of the platform remaining at the trackside as a result of it.

== See also ==
Other Metropolitan line stations that closed with the opening of the Bakerloo line tunnels:

- Swiss Cottage
- Marlborough Road

Preceding station	London Underground	Following station
Former services
Marlborough Road towards Aylesbury, Chesham, Uxbridge or Watford	Metropolitan line	Baker Street towards Baker Street or Aldgate
