= St John's Wood Church =

Coordinates: 51°31′49.5″N 0°10′05.5″W

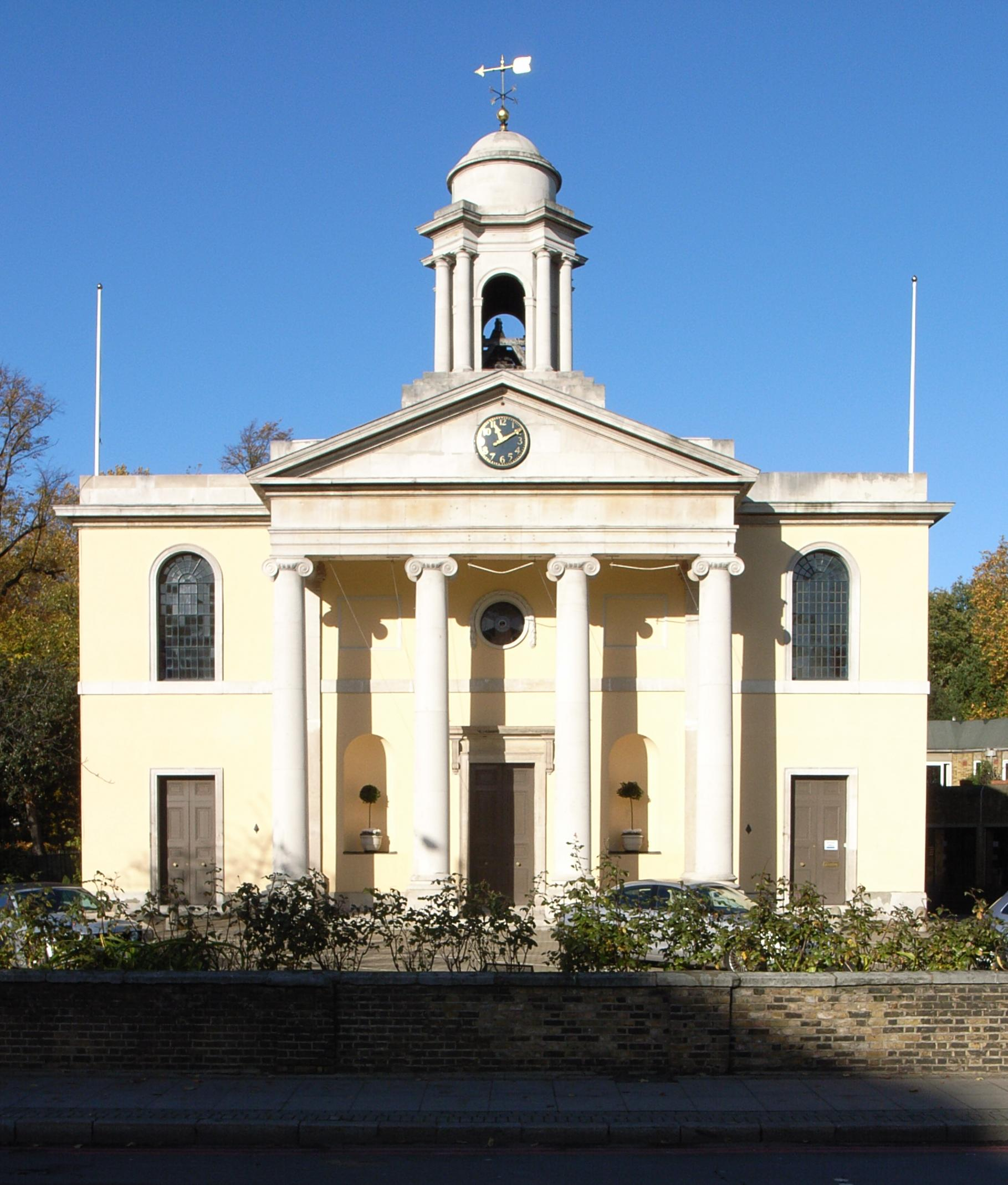
- St John's Wood Church
- Location: Lord's Roundabout, London NW8 7NE
- Country: England
- Denomination: Church of England
- Website: www.stjohnswoodchurch.org.uk

History
- Dedicated: 24 May 1814

Architecture
- Architect: Thomas Hardwick
- Style: Neo-classical

Administration
- Diocese: London

Clergy
- Vicar(s): None, in interregnum

St John's Wood Church is an Anglican parish church in St John's Wood, London.

Built in the classical style, the Grade II*-listed church is situated on Lord's Roundabout, between Lord's Cricket Ground and Regent's Park in the Deanery of Westminster St Marylebone. The parish is under the jurisdiction of the Archdeacon of Charing Cross.

== History ==
St John's Wood Church started life as a chapel of ease to St Marylebone Parish Church, and was constructed in 1814 by Thomas Hardwick, who was simultaneously constructing the current St Marylebone Church. Although the church originally had extensive burial grounds, these were closed in 1855 and opened as a public garden, St. John's Wood Church Grounds, in 1886. There are thought to be around 50,000 graves, including those of the artist John Sell Cotman and the prophetess Joanna Southcott.

In 1898 the building became a chapel of ease to Christ Church, Marylebone, and increasingly became the centre of administration for the parish.

After bomb damage during the Second World War rendered St Stephen's, Avenue Road unusable, St John's Wood Church became a parish church in its own right in 1952. As well as holding regular services for the community, the church hosted the society wedding of Peggy Cripps to Joe Appiah in June 1953, the blessing of the marriage of Paul and Linda McCartney in 1969, and the funeral of Ursula Vaughan Williams in 2007.

A Church Hall complex was constructed in the 1970s, the completion of which was marked with the erection of a statue of the church's patron, John the Baptist, by Hans Feibusch. Restoration of the church interior took place in 1991 under the supervision of Michael Reardon, when the chancel pavement was relaid in limestone and the present central altar replaced the high altar at the east end of the church.

== Present day ==
The church has between 130 and 150 regular worshippers, with an electoral roll of 225. Services aim to maintain "a tradition of thoughtful and intelligent preaching and teaching", as well as the church's musical tradition; in addition to a professional octet of singers leading the worship at the main Sunday service, an amateur Chamber Choir made up of members of the congregation sings Evensong once a month. The organ is a three manual, 52 stop instrument by B. C. Shepherd and Sons. The building is also kept open from early morning to late afternoon every day as a place of prayer and stillness.

St John's Wood Church works closely with other local churches, who together hold a monthly service with letter-writing for Amnesty International. Clergy from St John's Wood Church also meet with representatives from the nearby Liberal Jewish Synagogue and London Central Mosque to hold scriptural reasoning discussions.

During term-time the Church Hall complex is occupied by St John's Wood Pre-Preparatory School during the day,. A local youth club used to operate in the crypt on Monday, Wednesday and Friday evenings. The hall is also occasionally hired out for local residents' association meetings, and to charities such as ARC UK.

== Incumbents ==
Incumbents of St John's Wood Chapel

- Okey Belfour, 1814–18
- Gilbert Parke, 1818–25
- Thomas Wharton, 1825–55
- Henry Sandham, 1855–95
- William Ferrar, 1896–99
- James Beaumont, 1900–15
- Edward Adams, 1915–25
- Brierley Kay, 1925–40
- Oswin Gibbs-Smith, 1941–47
- Noel Perry-Gore, 1947–52

Vicars of St John's Wood Church

- Noel Perry-Gore, 1952–72
- Tim Raphael, 1973–83
- John Slater, 1983–2001
- Anders Bergquist, 2002–2026

== See also ==
- Lord's Cricket Ground
- List of churches in London
