= Swiss Cottage tube station (1868–1940) =

Disused London Underground station in Swiss Cottage

Swiss Cottage
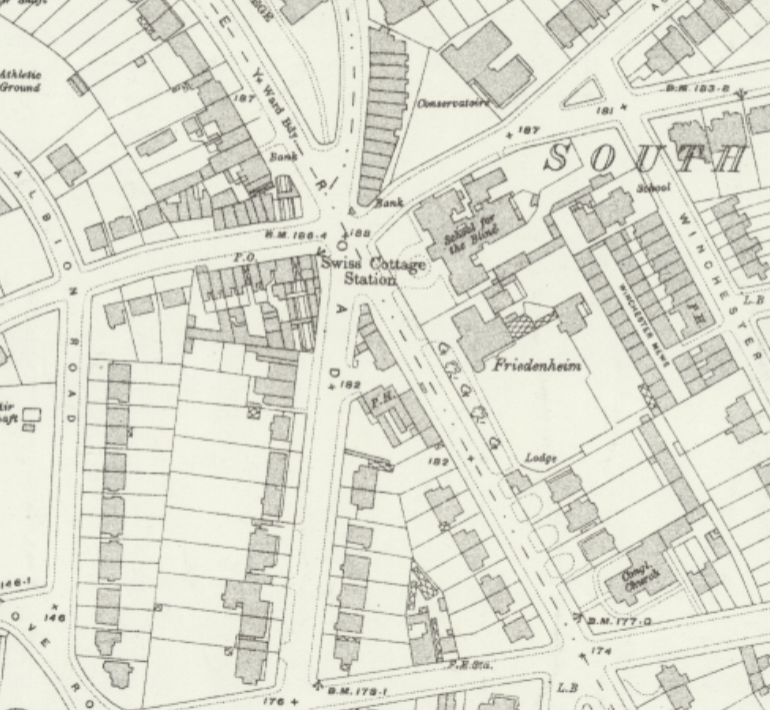
- Station on a 1915 Ordnance Survey map
- Interactive map of Swiss Cottage

General information
- Location: Swiss Cottage
- Owner: Metropolitan Railway
- Number of platforms: 2

Key dates
- 1868: Opened (terminus)
- 1879: Started (to West Hampstead)
- 1940: Closed
- Replaced by: Swiss Cottage

Other information
- Coordinates: 51°32′37.172″N 0°10′30.705″W

Swiss Cottage is a disused London Underground station in Swiss Cottage, north-west London. It was opened in 1868 as the northern terminus of the Metropolitan and St. John's Wood Railway (M&StJWR), the first northward branch extension from Baker Street of the Metropolitan Railway (now the Metropolitan line).

Subsequent to the opening of a new Swiss Cottage station, which was served initially by the Bakerloo line (1939–1979) and is now on the Jubilee line (1979–present), this Metropolitan line Swiss Cottage station was closed in 1940.

== History ==
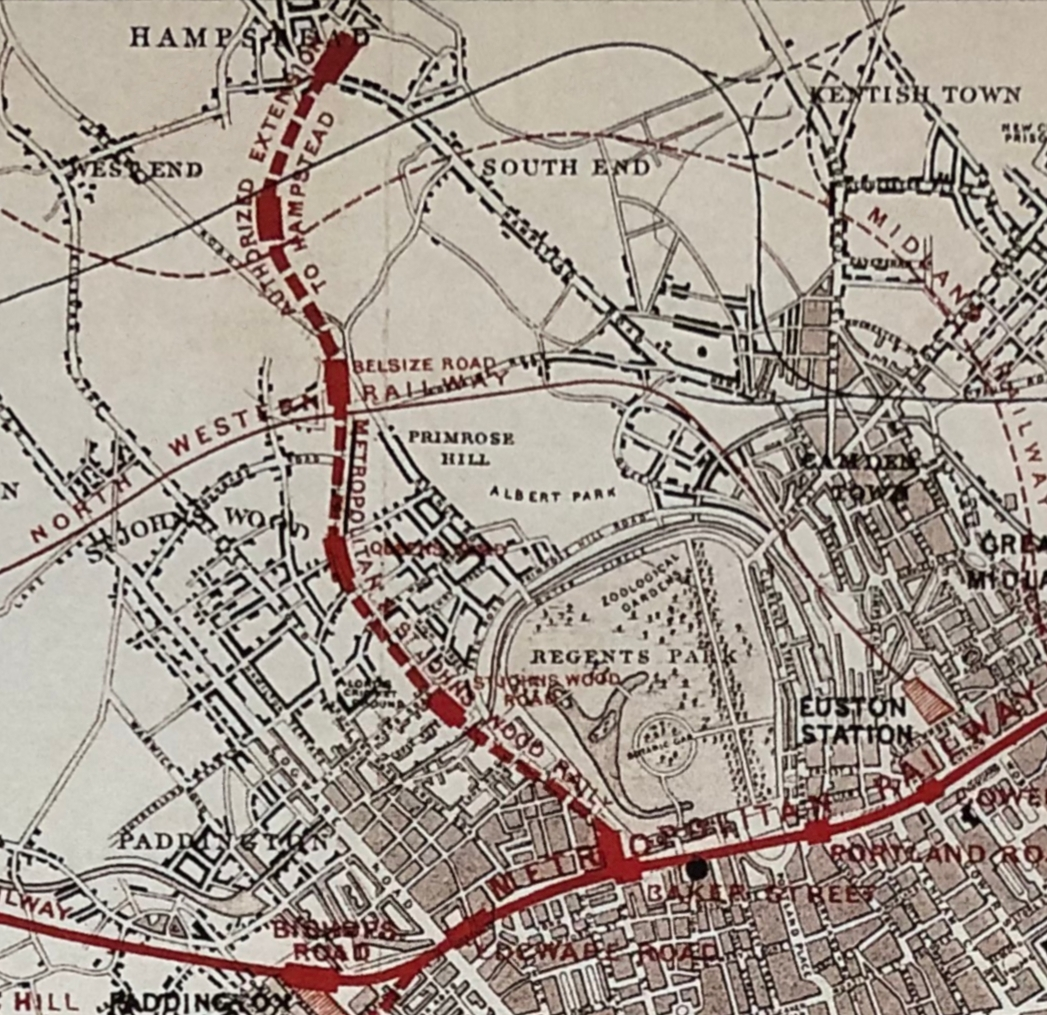
Proposed Metropolitan & St John's Wood Railway between Baker Street and Hampstead from a Metropolitan Railway map, circa 1867 (full map)

The M&StJWR was a separately promoted railway partly funded and operated by the Metropolitan Railway (MR). The line north from the MR's station at Baker Street was approved in 1864 and was to continue to a station next to the London and North Western Railway's Finchley Road station (now Finchley Road and Frognal). Financial difficulties meant the scope of the line was reduced to a single track line and only progressed as far as Swiss Cottage, which opened with the line on 13 April 1868.

On 26 April 1868, two trains collided head-on at the station. This was the result of a signaller's error, which caused an arriving train to be misrouted to the platform where another train stood awaiting departure. Three people were injured.

In 1873, the M&StJWR was authorised to extend its railway to Kingsbury and to add a second track between Swiss Cottage and Baker Street. The first extension to West Hampstead opened on 30 June 1879 as an interim single track shuttle service from Swiss Cottage before works to Willesden Green were completed and opened on 24 November 1879. The MR took control of the M&StJWR on 1 April 1882. The line was subsequently extended in stages to reach Watford, Aylesbury, Chesham and Uxbridge.

In the 1920s, the MR demolished the street-level station building on the west side of Finchley Road, and replaced it with a shopping arcade and three entrances down to the station. The structure was built to the designs of C. W. Clark.

By the mid-1930s, the Metropolitan line was suffering congestion at the south end of its main route, where trains from its many branches were struggling to share the limited capacity of its tracks between Finchley Road and Baker Street. To ease this congestion, a new section of deep-level tunnel was constructed between Finchley Road station and the Bakerloo line tunnels at Baker Street. The Metropolitan line's Stanmore branch services were then transferred to the Bakerloo line, with effect from 20 November 1939, and diverted to run into Baker Street in the new tunnels, thus reducing the number of trains using the Metropolitan line's tracks.

For the new deep-level route, a new Bakerloo line station named Swiss Cottage was opened adjacent to the existing Metropolitan line station. For a time, they operated as a single station (platforms 1 and 2 were for the Metropolitan line, and platforms 3 and 4 were for the Bakerloo line). This arrangement was short-lived, however, and the Metropolitan line Swiss Cottage station was closed after the last train on 17 August 1940 as a wartime economy. On 1 May 1979, the Stanmore branch of the Bakerloo line was transferred to the new Jubilee line.

The MR station building was demolished in the 1960s to allow the widening of Finchley Road, but the former platform area still exists in part.

== Unbuilt line to Hampstead ==
Before the line was constructed, the M&StJWR received authorisation in 1865 to continue the line northwards from Finchley Road to a station at Hampstead. This appeared on some maps. The scheme was cancelled in 1870. A 156-yard (143 m) section of tunnel was built north of Swiss Cottage station for the Hampstead extension, most of which was used for the later extension to the north-west. A short length towards Hampstead was unused. This is still visible today when travelling on a southbound Metropolitan line service.

== See also ==
Other Metropolitan line stations closed with the opening of the deep tunnel section:

- Lord's
- Marlborough Road

== Bibliography ==
- Leboff, David; Demuth, Tim (1999). No Need To Ask. Harrow Weald: Capital Transport. ISBN 185414-215-1.
- Jackson, Alan (1986). London's Metropolitan Railway. Newton Abbot: David & Charles. ISBN 0-7153-8839-8.
- Rose, Douglas (2016) [1980]. The London Underground, A Diagrammatic History (9th ed.). Douglas Rose/Capital Transport. ISBN 978-1-85414-404-1.

Preceding station	London Underground	Following station
Former services
Finchley Road towards Aylesbury, Chesham, Uxbridge or Watford	Metropolitan line	Marlborough Road towards Baker Street or Aldgate
Abandoned plans
Finchley Road towards Hampstead	Metropolitan Railway; Metropolitan and St John's Wood Railway (1864-1870)	Marlborough Road towards Baker Street
