= Wellington Hospital =

Wellington Hospital might refer to:

- Wellington Hospital, New Zealand, a hospital in Wellington, New Zealand
- Wellington Hospital, London, a hospital in London, United Kingdom
