= Marcus Cooper =

Marcus Cooper may refer to:

- Marcus Cooper (property developer) (born 1966), British property developer
- Pleasure P (Marcus Ramone Cooper Sr., born 1984), American R&B singer
  - The Introduction of Marcus Cooper, Pleasure P's 2009 debut album
- Marcus Cooper (American football) (born 1990), American football cornerback
- Marcus Cooper (canoeist) (born 1994), Spanish canoeist
