= Wellington Road, London =

Street in St John's Wood, London, England

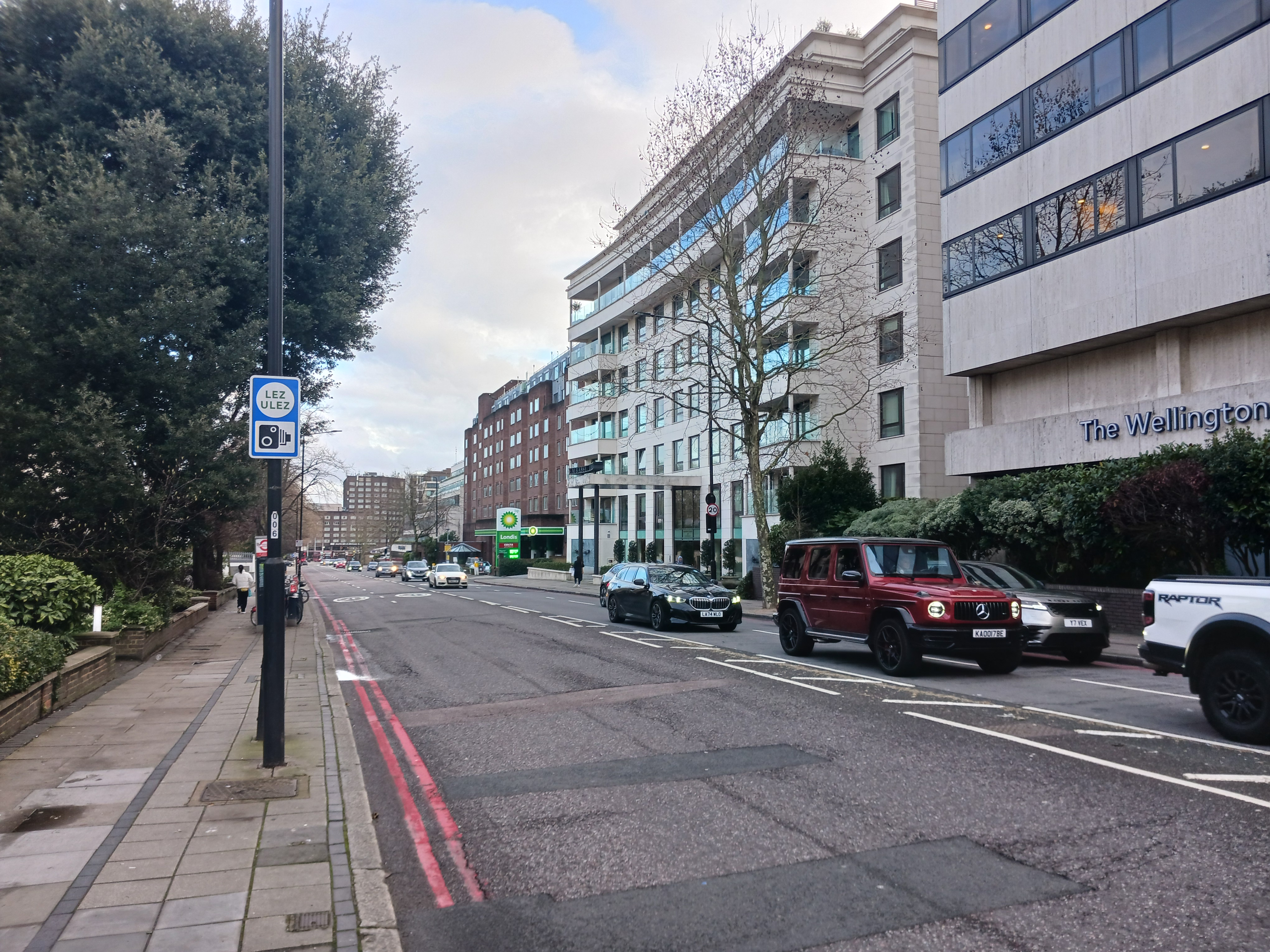
Wellington Road, facing south

Wellington Road is a street in St John's Wood, London, England. It forms part of the A41 route.

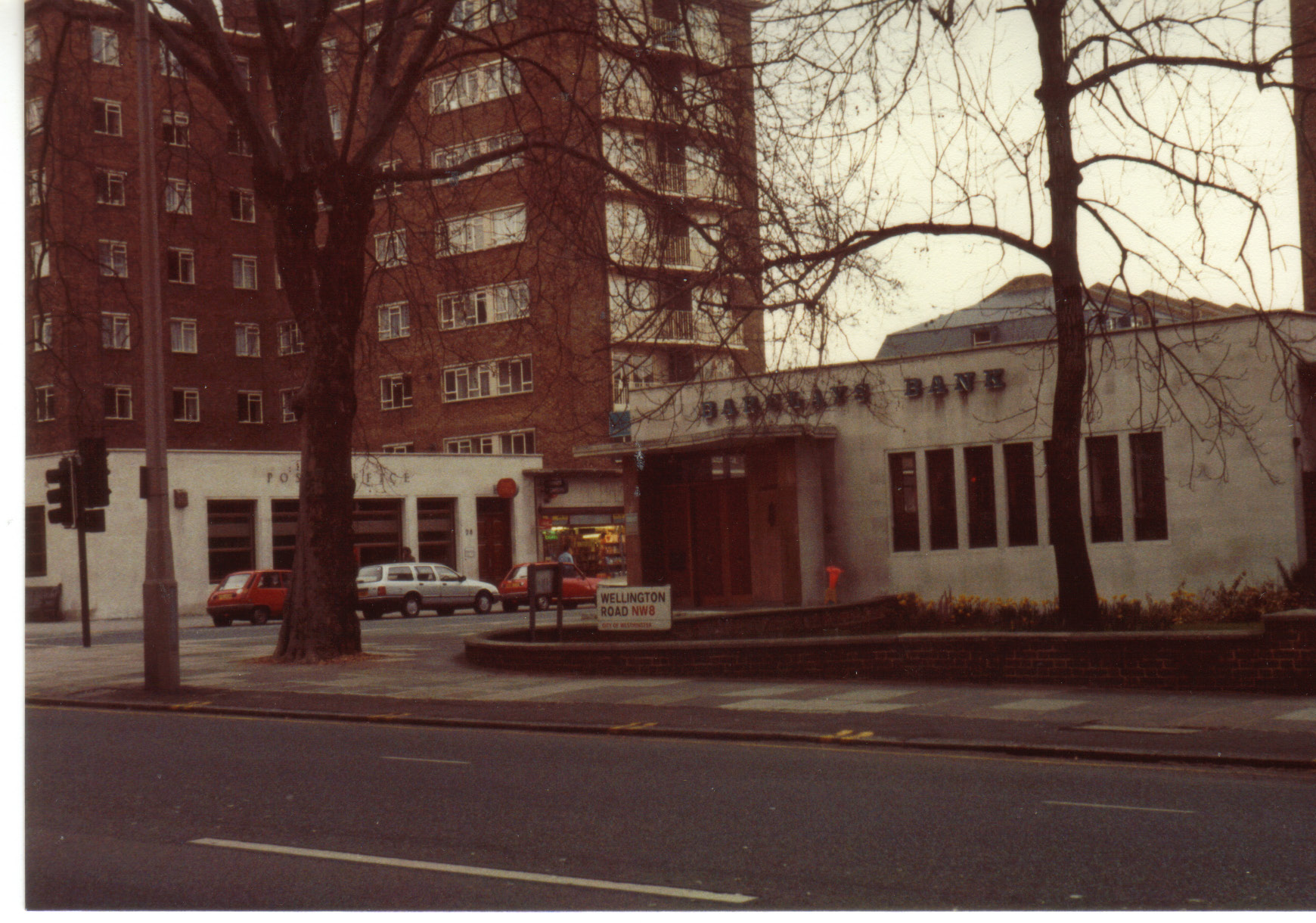
Wellington Road at the corner of Circus Road, 1989

Wellington Road runs from the junction with Prince Albert Road and Park Road in the south to the junction with Acacia Road and Grove End Road in the north, after which it continues as Finchley Road. Along the way, it crosses Wellington Place and Circus Road. The southern part of the street passes between Lord's Cricket Ground and St. John's Wood Church Grounds. At its northern end lies St John's Wood tube station.

The street was laid out in the early 19th century and named in honour of the Duke of Wellington and his victory over Napoleon at the Battle of Waterloo in 1815. At this time, St John’s Wood was still mostly rural with fields and scattered farms, but the proximity of landmarks such as Regent’s Park and Lord's Cricket Ground encouraged street building and residential development from around 1809 onward.

Wellington Hospital is located on the street. The embassies of Cambodia and South Sudan once operated out of a building at 28-32 Wellington Road. After they relocated, the building was demolished and replaced with luxury tourist apartments.

The sculptor Madame Tussaud lived at 24 Wellington Road.
