= Marlborough Place =

Street in London

Coordinates: 51.53474°N 0.18019°W

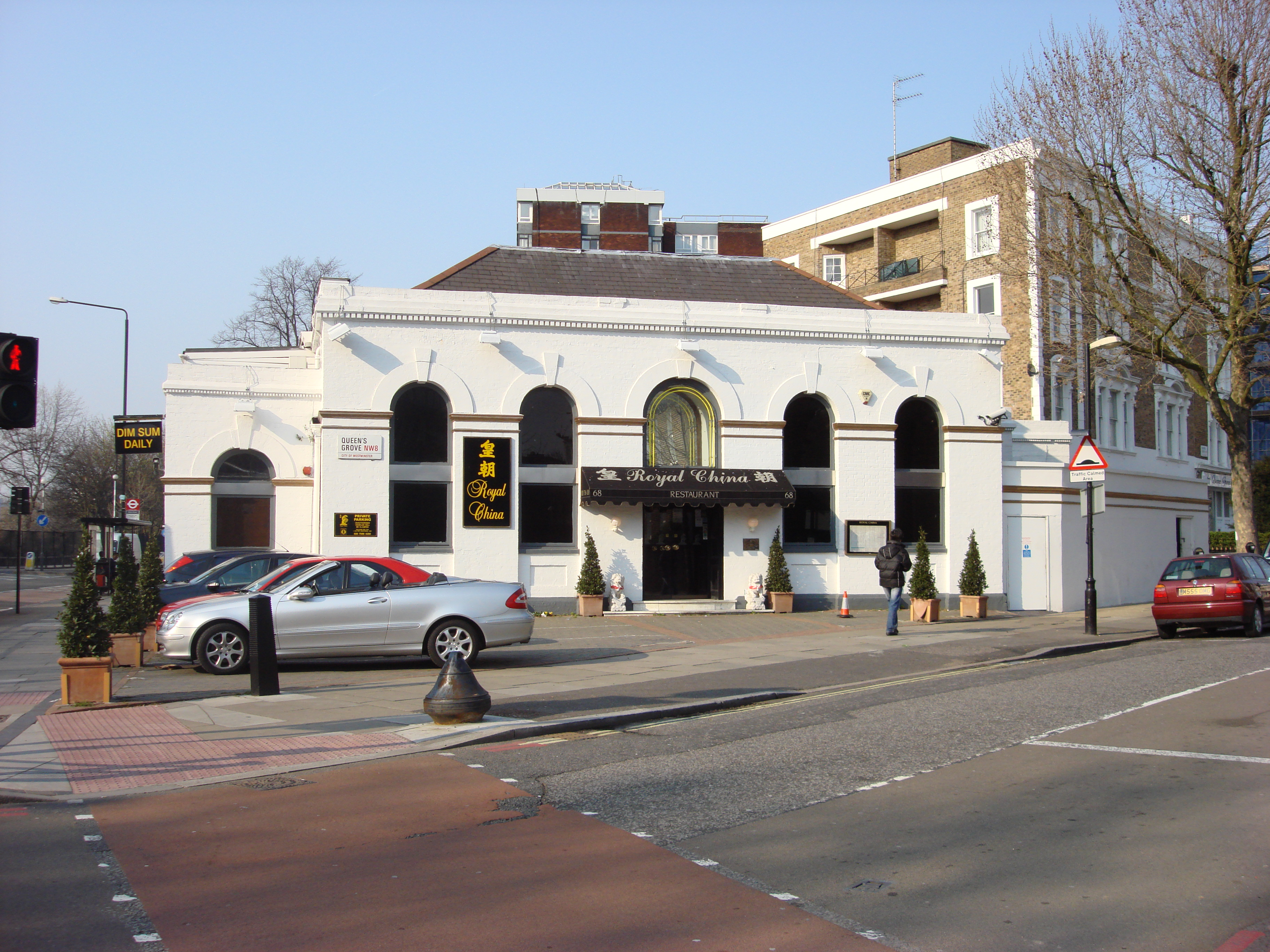
The now closed Marlborough Road tube station took its name from the street.

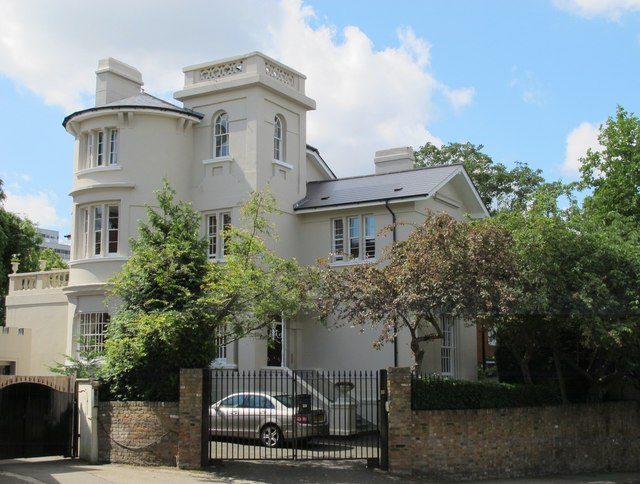
House in Marlborough Place.

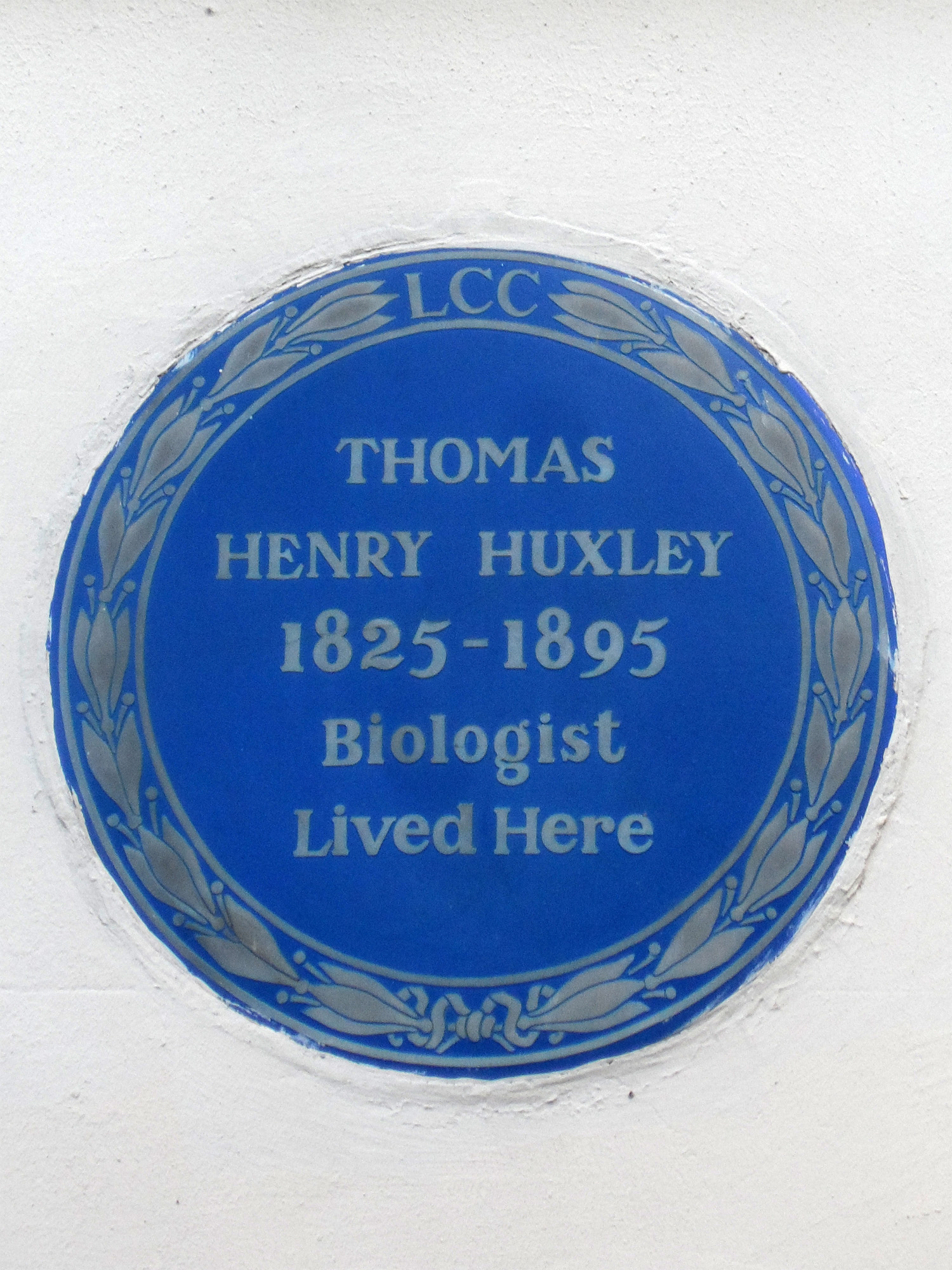
Blue plaque commemorating the biologist Thomas Henry Huxley.

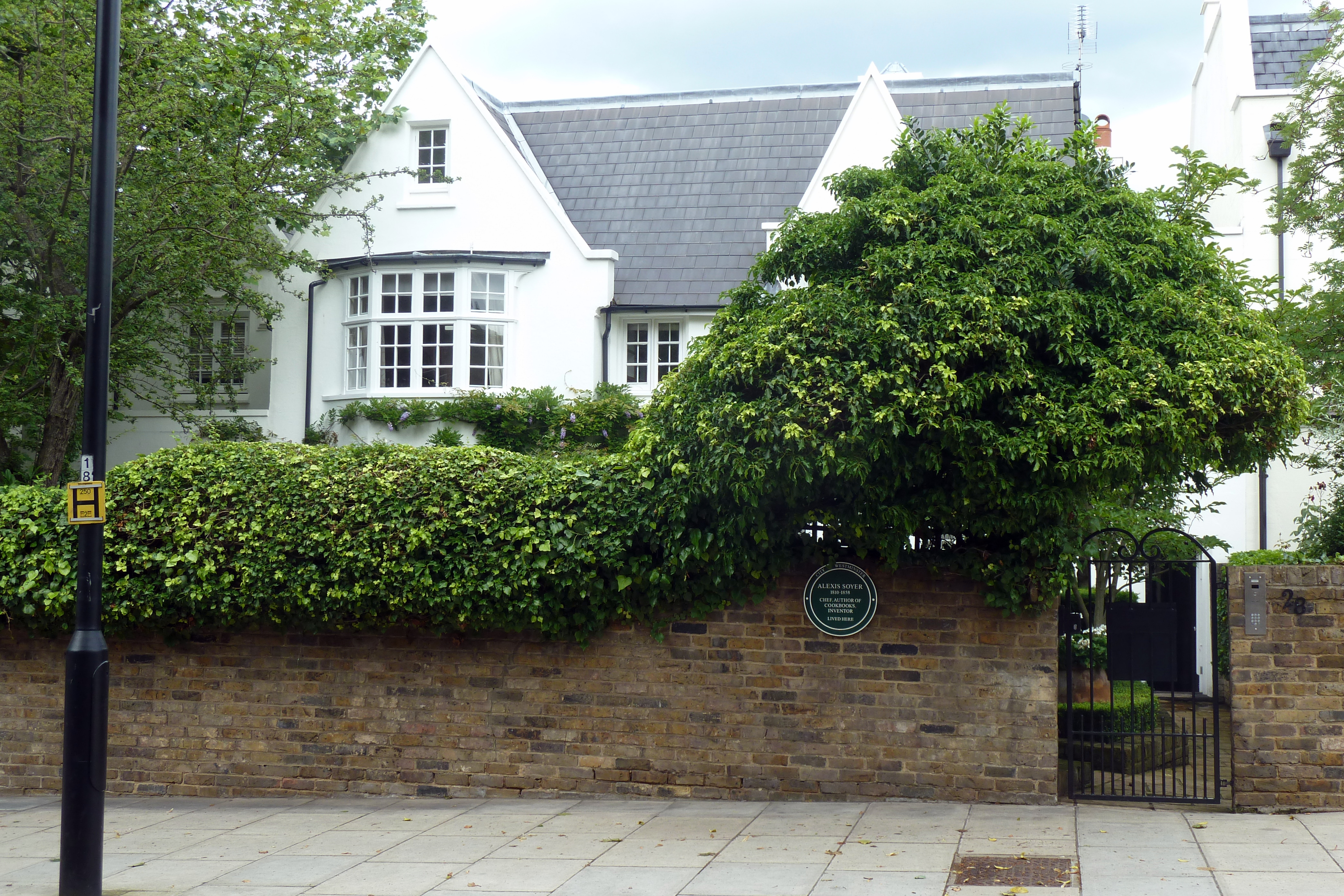
House in Marlborough Place with a plaque commeorating Alexis Soyer.

Marlborough Place is a street in St John's Wood in London, England. Located in the City of Westminster it is a residential road running from Hamilton Terrace in the west to the Finchley Road in the east. Like many British streets, its name derives from the Dukes of Marlborough.

The area was developed in the nineteenth century as the capital expanded into new suburbs, and the building designs mostly date from the Victorian era with a number of twentieth century additions. Much of the street was known as Marlborough Road before its renaming in the 1950s. The Metropolitan Line tube station Marlborough Road opened in 1868 was named after it, although its station entrance was on Queen's Grove on the opposite east side of the Finchley Road.

The biologist Thomas Henry Huxley lived in the street, and is commemorated with a blue plaque dating from 1910.

== Bibliography ==
- Bebbington, Gillian. London Street Names. Batsford, 1972.
- Bownes, David. The Metropolitan Railway. Tempus, 2004.
