= Witanhurst =

Grade II* listed mansion in north London

Coordinates: 51°34′08″N 0°09′10″W

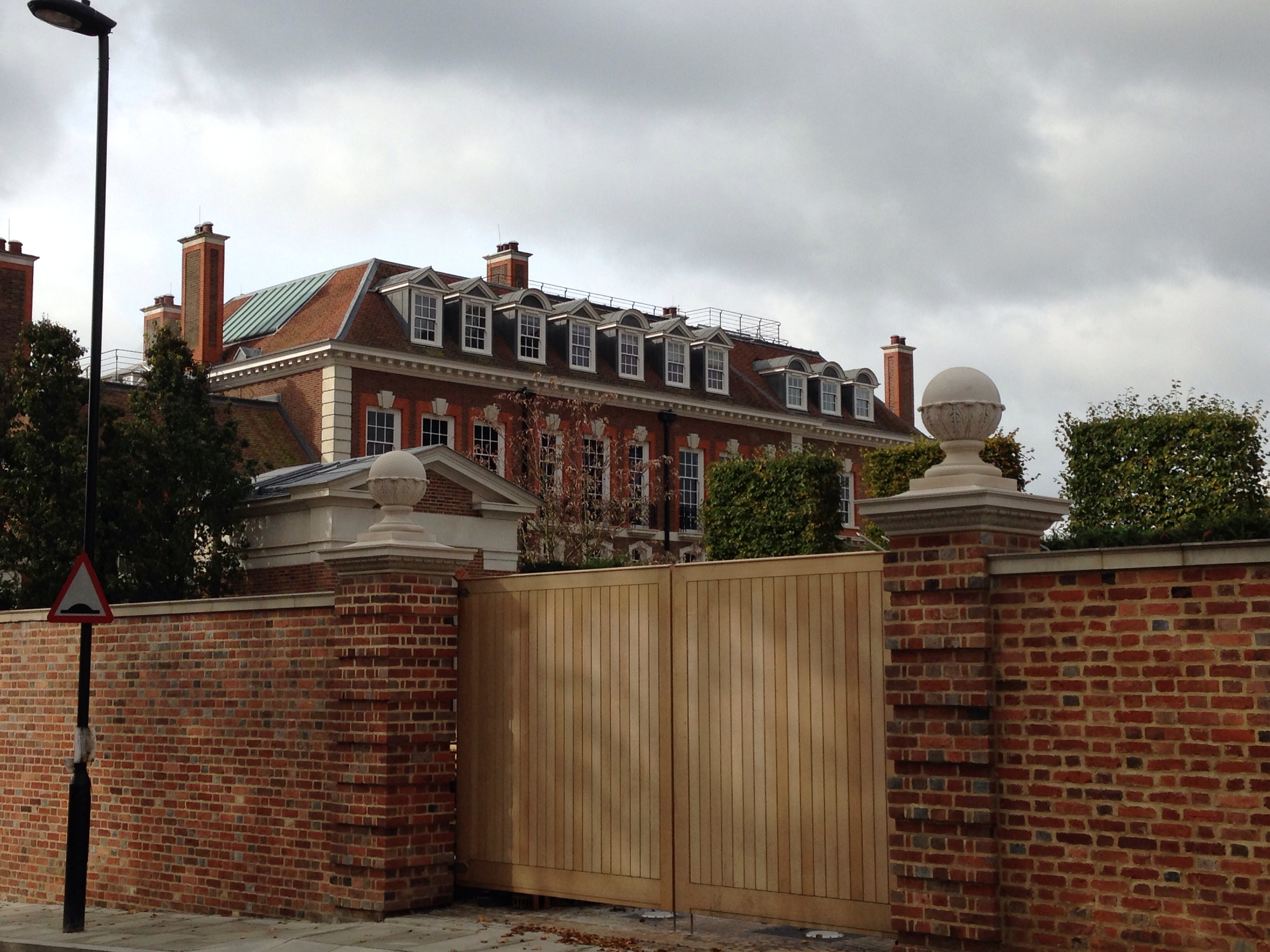
Witanhurst from Highgate West Hill, October 2016

Witanhurst is a large Grade II listed 1930s Georgian Revival mansion on 5 acres (2.0 ha) in Highgate, North London. It has had several prominent owners since being rebuilt by the soap magnate and politician Sir Arthur Crosfield. After several decades of increasing dilapidation it underwent substantial refurbishment after its sale in 2008 to an offshore company owned by the family of the Russian businessman Andrey Guryev.

== History ==
The original estate, dating from 1774, was known as Parkfield, situated at the junction of Highgate West Hill and The Grove. The current house, built between 1913 and 1920, was designed by the architect George Hubbard for the soap magnate and politician Sir Arthur Crosfield on an 11-acre (4.5 ha) site. The mansion is Grade-II* listed, meaning it has been judged to be of national historic or architectural interest. In the late 20th century and early 21st century English Heritage placed the property on its Buildings at Risk Register.

Paul Crosfield sold Witanhurst to the property-developer Lionel Green in 1970. It was possessed by banks shortly after, and owned by various other property-developers for the next fifteen years. Various schemes for redeveloping Witanhurst were proposed and rejected by Camden council during this period, including turning the house into a hotel or apartments. Various pieces of land from Witanhurst's large estate were sold.

In 1976 Witanhurst was bought by Al-Hasouwy for £1.3 million. He spent £500,000 developing the property. It was then put up for sale in 1977 for £7 million, with planning permission for 63 houses. In 1984 the property was sold for £7 million by Noble Investment Corporation, a shell company believed to have been linked to the al-Hasawi family. A revised scheme for 24 houses to be built on part of the land was sold for more than £7 million.

The buyer of the house was Mounir Developments, a company registered in the tax haven of Panama. The ultimate beneficial owner of Mounir Developments was eventually revealed in a court case to be a relation of the Assad family, the ruling family of Syria, who were then in exile in England. Somar al-Assad, a cousin of the then Syrian president Bashar al-Assad, stated in a court case that he had not slept at Witanhurst in the previous eight years of ownership, by a trust connected to the family.

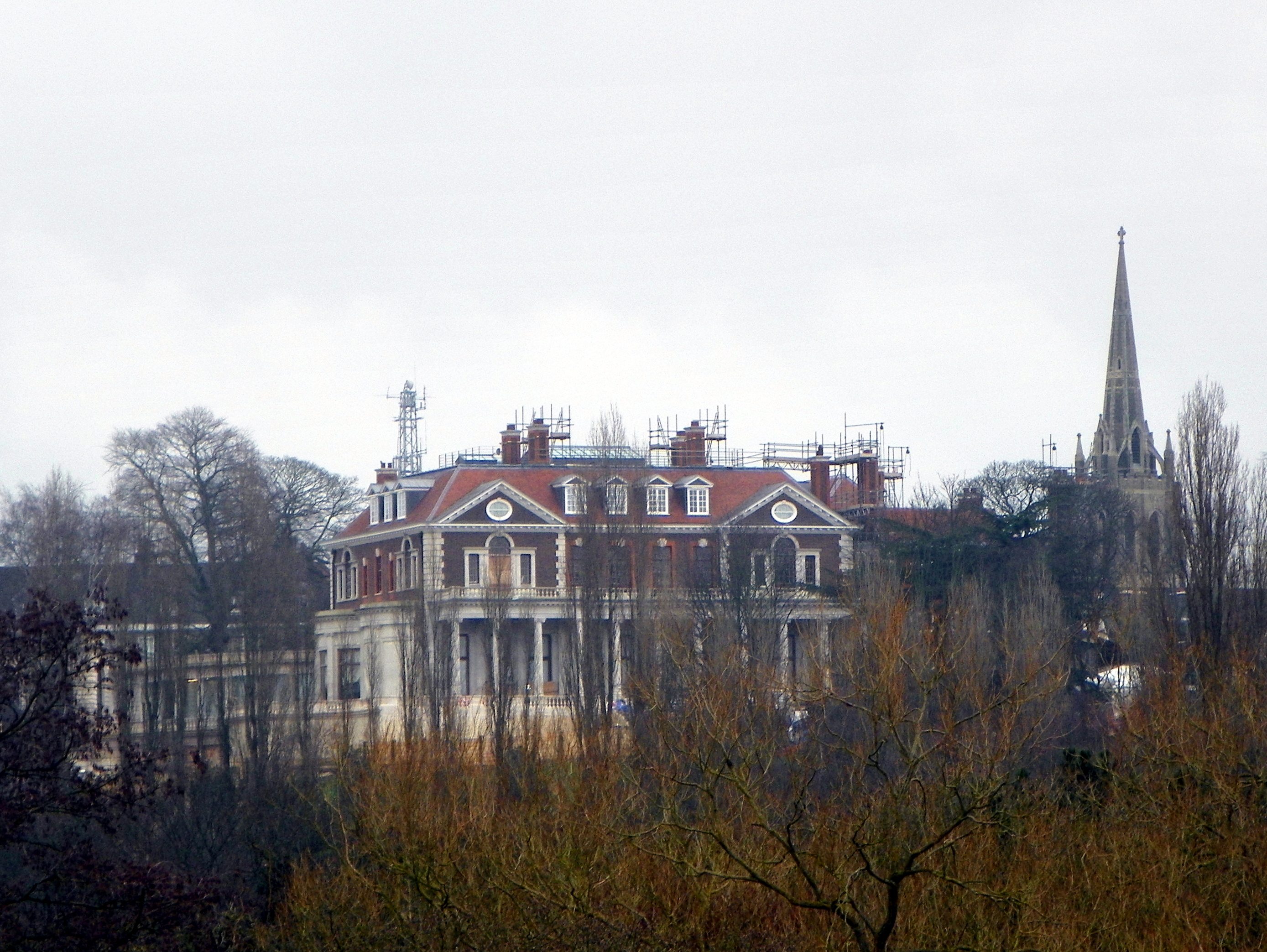
Witanhurst and Highgate's St Michael's Church as viewed from Hampstead Heath, February 2013

Witanhurst was used as the location of BBC's Fame Academy talent show from 2002 to 2004. The interior of the house was renovated to add a recording studio and gym. During its use on the show Witanhurst was on English Heritage's list of buildings "at risk". In 2002, during the first series of Fame Academy, nine portable buildings, a television studio and generators were erected in front of Witanhurst without the requisite consent required for a listed building. The production company Endemol withdrew their application to use Witanhurst for a planned third series of the show in 2004 following a critical report by planners from Camden London Borough Council.

In 2007 the Assads sold Witanhurst to the British property developer Marcus Cooper for £32.5 million. Cooper repaired Witanhurst to satisfy Camden council's previous complaints, and put the property up for sale for £75 million through the estate agents Glentree Estates and Knight Frank.

Witanhurst was bought by the family of the Russian billionaire Andrey Guryev through an offshore company called Safran Holdings, located in the tax haven of the British Virgin Islands for £50 million in 2008. The owner of Witanhurst was not publicly known from its 2008 sale until the publication of a 2015 article by Ed Caesar in The New Yorker magazine.

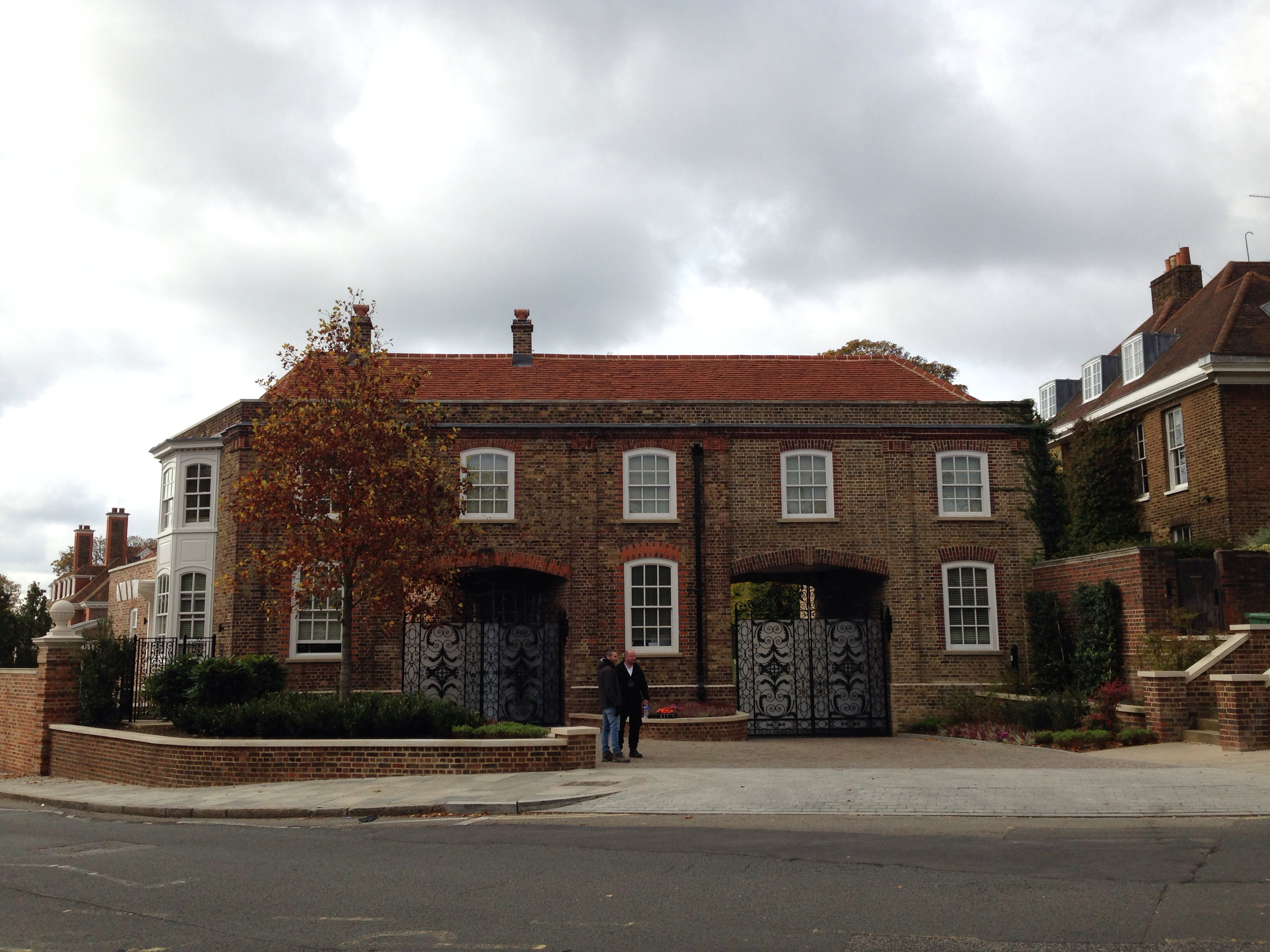
The gatehouse and main entrance to Witanhurst from Highgate's South Grove, October 2016

In September 2009 The Sunday Times erroneously stated that Witanhurst had been bought by Elena Baturina, the wife of the former mayor of Moscow Yury Luzhkov via an offshore front company. Baturina sued the newspaper's owners, Times Newspapers, a subsidiary of News International. Times Newspapers apologised for the story and paid damages to Baturina in October 2011.

Much of the redevelopment focused on the large basement extension to the main house that extends for two storeys below the entire footprint of the building. Over 90,000 square feet, Witanhurst is the second-largest private residence in London, after Buckingham Palace. It is said to be worth US$450 million.

== Facilities ==
The mansion has 65 rooms spread across three floors, including 25 bedrooms. One of the largest is the ballroom, measuring 70 feet (21 m) long with a height of 20 feet (6.1 m). It has oak flooring and the timber wall panels are in walnut, with carved cornices embellished with gold leaf.

Other rooms are the drawing room, study, entrance hall and staircase, and most of the bedrooms are all in an opulent classical style. Other richly decorated rooms include the dining room, Chinese room, billiard room and the gallery hallway. Access to the property is via a three-fingered gatehouse.

== Filming location ==
Witanhurst has been used on several occasions as a filming location by various production companies including the BBC, to shoot films and television programmes such as The Lost Prince, Tipping the Velvet and Fame Academy.
