= Marlborough Road tube station =

Former station in St John's Wood, London

Marlborough Road
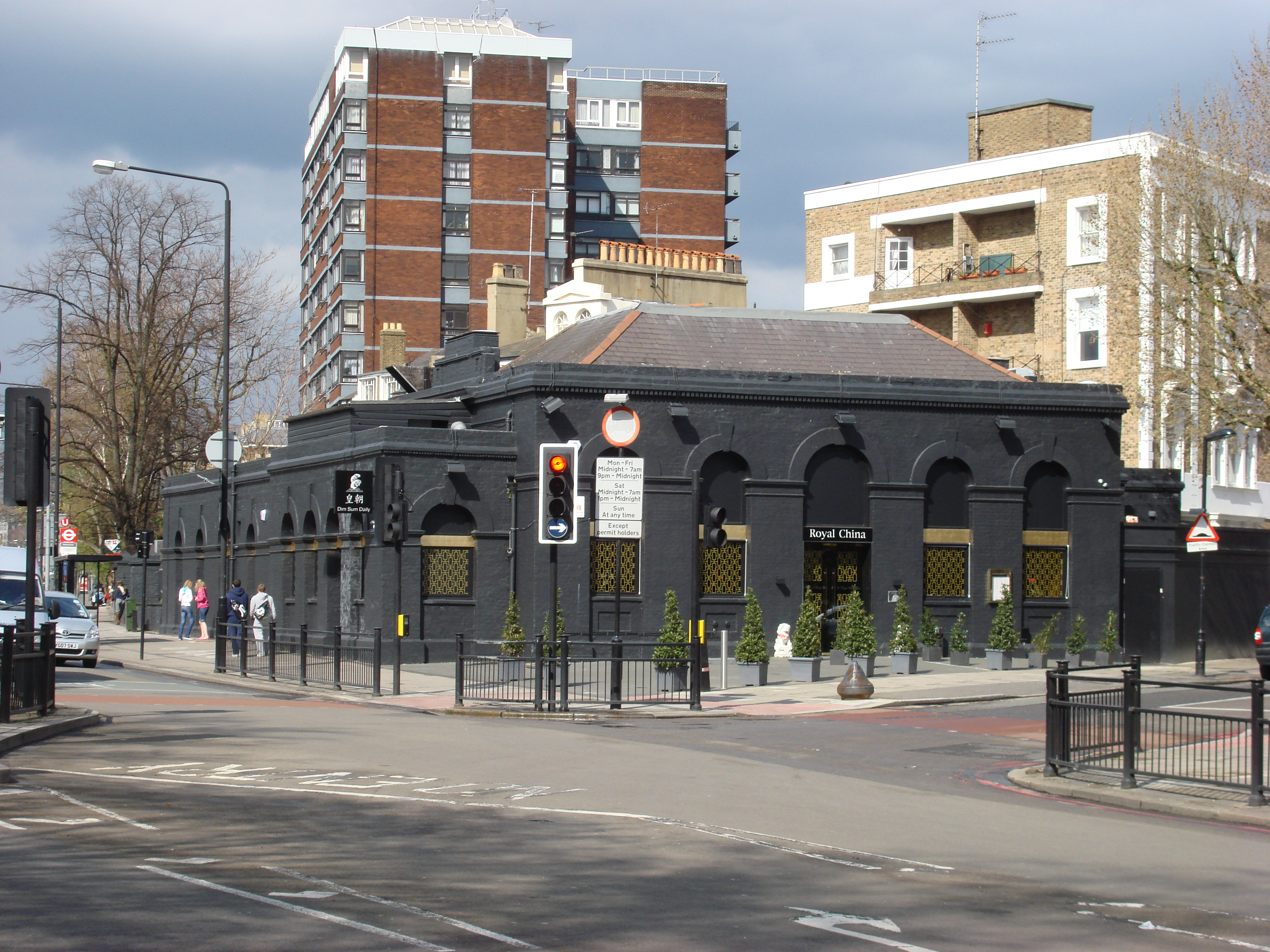
- The station building in 2008
- Interactive map of Marlborough Road

General information
- Location: St John's Wood
- Owner: Metropolitan Railway
- Number of platforms: 2

Key dates
- 13 April 1868: Opened
- 20 November 1939: Closed
- Replaced by: St John's Wood

Other information
- Coordinates: 51.53666°N 0.17593°W

Marlborough Road is a disused London Underground station in St John's Wood, northwest London NW8, England. It opened in April 1868 on the Metropolitan & St. John's Wood Railway, the first northward extension from Baker Street of the Metropolitan Railway (now the Metropolitan line). It is located at the junction of Finchley Road and Queen's Grove.

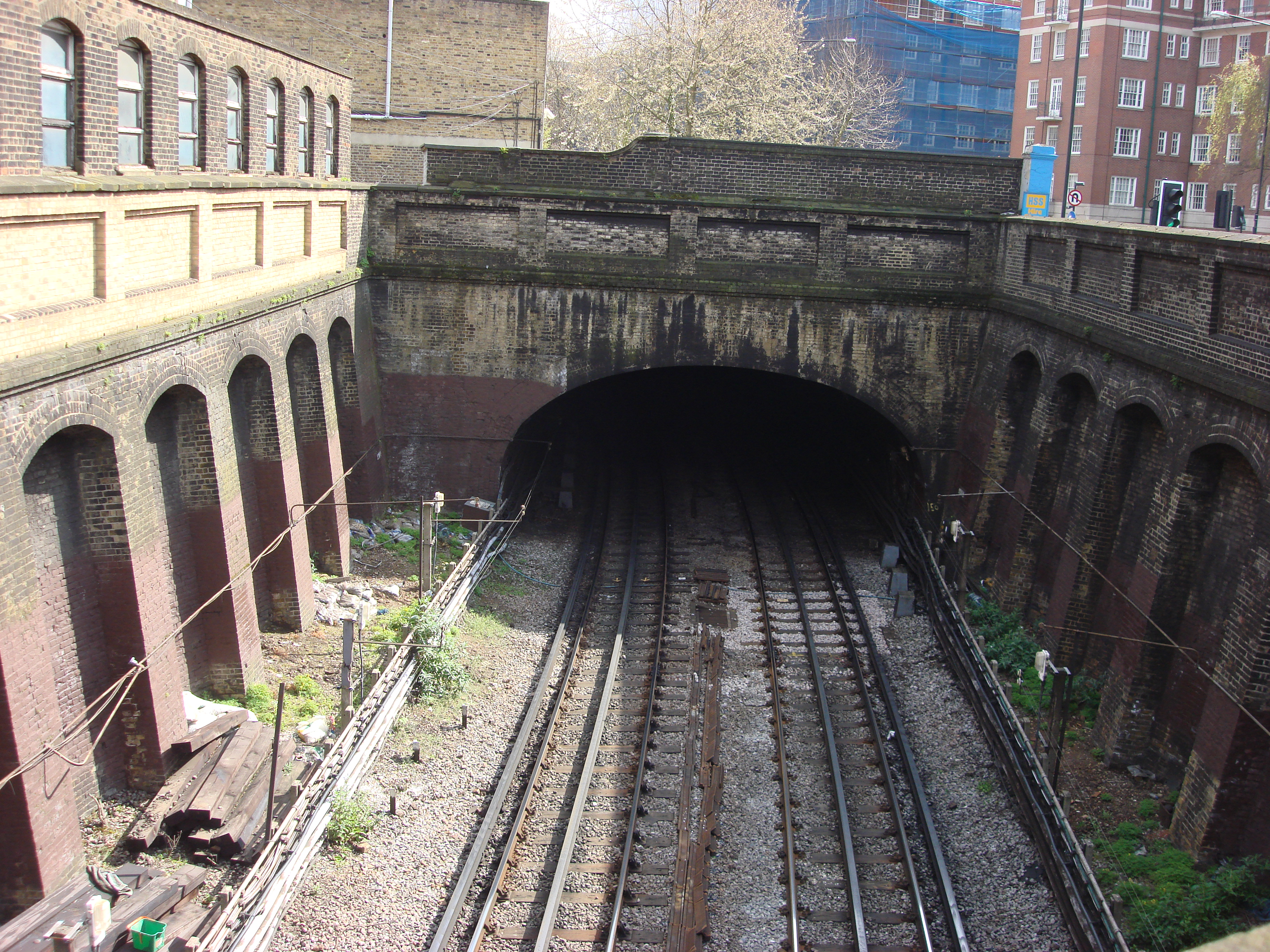
Site of the old platforms at Marlborough Road

In the mid-1930s, the Metropolitan line was suffering congestion at the south end of its main route, where trains from its many branches shared the limited capacity between Finchley Road and Baker Street. To ease this congestion, new deep-level tunnels were constructed between Finchley Road and the Bakerloo line tunnels at Baker Street; then, commencing on 20 November 1939, the Metropolitan's services toward Stanmore were transferred to the Bakerloo line (they are now on the Jubilee line) and ran to Baker Street through the new tunnels.

Upon the transfer, Marlborough Road station was closed and replaced by St John's Wood station, then on the Bakerloo line; it had been little used, except (owing to its close proximity to Lord's Cricket Ground) during the cricket season.

Shots of the remains of the platforms, and an outside shot of the station building and booking hall—which at the time was in use as a steak restaurant—were included in Metro-Land, a 1973 documentary presented by John Betjeman. The building housed a Chinese restaurant until 2009 and now contains a substation installed as part of the power upgrade programme to support the introduction of S stock on the Metropolitan line.

Marlborough Road itself was renamed Marlborough Place in the 1950s.

== See also ==
Other Metropolitan line stations that closed with the opening of the new Bakerloo tunnels:

- Swiss Cottage
- Lord's

Preceding station	London Underground	Following station
Former services
Swiss Cottage towards Aylesbury, Chesham, Uxbridge or Watford	Metropolitan line	Lord's towards Baker Street or Aldgate
