= St John's Wood tube station =

London Underground station

St. John's Wood
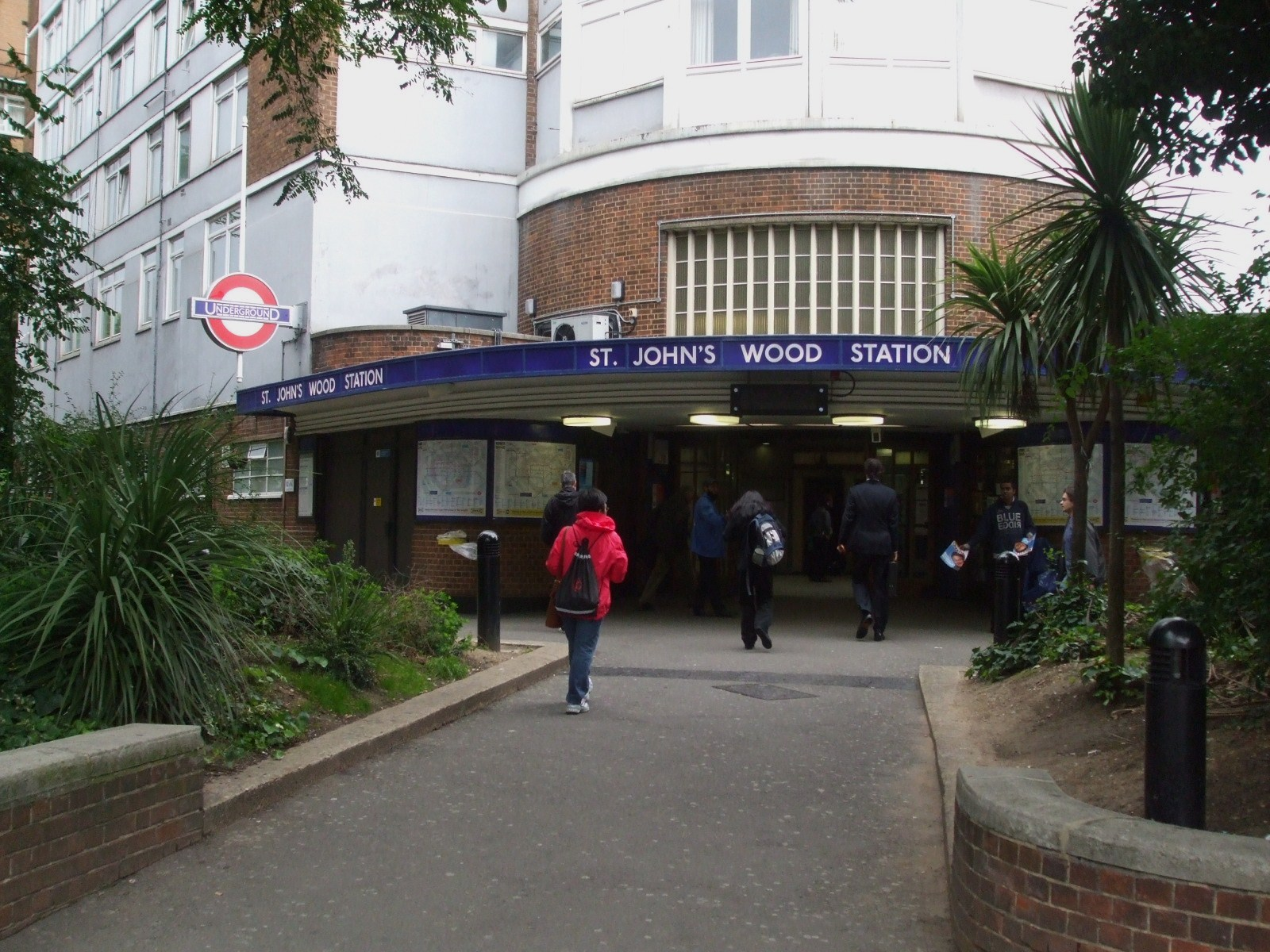
- Station entrance
- Interactive map of St. John's Wood

General information
- Location: St John's Wood
- Local authority: City of Westminster
- Managed by: London Underground
- Number of platforms: 2
- Fare zone: 2

London Underground annual entry and exit
- 2020: ▼4.11 million
- 2021: ▼3.46 million
- 2022: ▲5.63 million
- 2023: ▲5.87 million
- 2024: ▲6.17 million

Railway companies
- Original company: London Passenger Transport Board

Key dates
- 20 November 1939: Opened
- 1 May 1979: Bakerloo line service replaced by Jubilee line

Listed status
- Listing grade: II
- Entry number: 1401096
- Added to list: 20 July 2011

Other information
- Coordinates: 51.53472°N 0.17417°W

St. John's Wood is a London Underground station. It is located in St John's Wood in the City of Westminster, north-west London. The station was opened in 1939 as a stop on the Bakerloo line. Today, it is on the Jubilee line between Swiss Cottage and Baker Street stations, and is in London fare zone 2.

Essentially, St. John's Wood station is a local station with the nearby Metropolitan line bypassing this station. A Jubilee line journey between St. John's Wood and Baker Street typically takes less than three minutes.

== Location ==
The station building is located on the corner of Acacia Road and Finchley Road and tube maps from late 1938 and early 1939 indicate that it was originally to be given the name Acacia Road or Acacia. This station is the nearest to Lord's Cricket Ground and Abbey Road Studios. The station is therefore not to be confused with Abbey Road DLR station in east London.

== History ==
=== Station origin as Lord's Tube Station ===
Further Information: Lord's Tube Station

In 1868, the Tube network (a branch of the Metropolitan Railway) extended from St John's Wood to Swiss Cottage, stopping at St John’s Wood and Marlborough Road. St John’s Wood station was right next to Lord’s Cricket Ground and during matches, it even had its own ticket office at the ground.

=== Transfer from Lord's to St John's Wood ===
St John’s Wood Station was not always named St John’s Wood and nor was it always in the same location. The original station in St John’s Wood was named St John’s Wood Road, then St John’s Wood and finally Lords, which was on the Metropolitan Line. Lord’s was once the only station that allowed customers to park their cars on the roof instead of in a ground-level car park or parking garage.

Right after the start of World War II, Lord’s was renamed to St John’s Wood and the new station served the present-day Bakerloo line. Meanwhile both Lord’s and nearby Marlborough Road shut down due to the close proximity.

During the Second World War, the station was used as a shelter and even had flats that had rooms for servants. Most of the recreational facilities were a short Tube ride away near present day Finchley Road. Despite this, there were still canteens, libraries, bunks and drinking water.

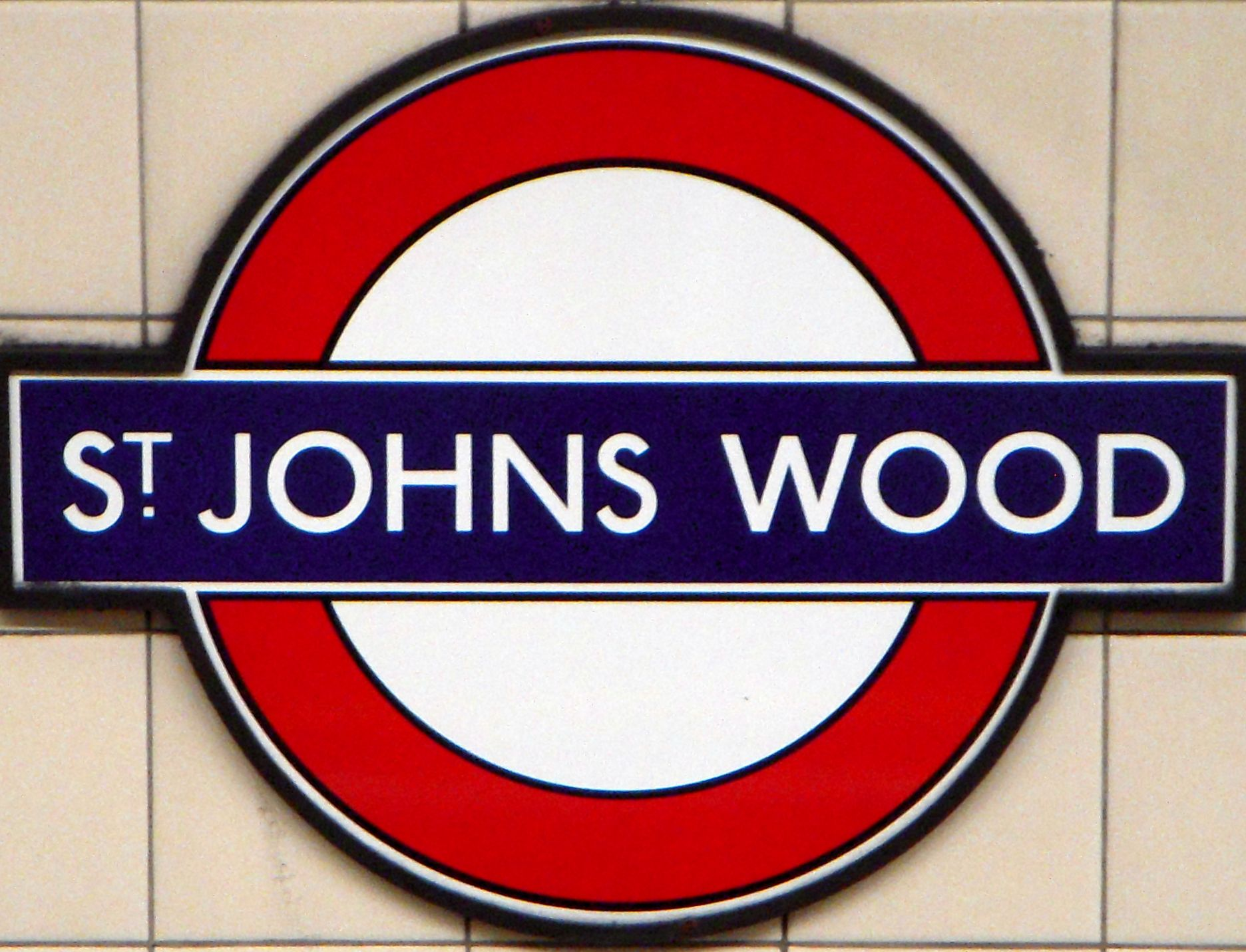
St. John's Wood station roundel

A new station was opened on 20 November 1939 on a new section of deep-level tunnel constructed between Baker Street and Finchley Road. At that point, the Metropolitan line's services on its Stanmore branch were transferred to the Bakerloo line. The new station replaced two nearby stations on the Metropolitan line which had closed the previous day. These were Lord's (originally named St. John's Wood Road, then St. John's Wood and, finally, Lord's) and Marlborough Road.

The station was transferred, along with the rest of the Stanmore branch, to the Jubilee line when it opened on 1 May 1979.

The station building designed by Stanley Heaps is Grade II listed.

The platform design remains the same as when opened in 1939, with ceramic relief tiles designed by Harold Stabler and that were also fitted to a number of other contemporary stations. In 2006, the tiles were cleaned up and replaced.

=== Transfer from Bakerloo line to Jubilee line ===
After the start of World War II, Lord's station closed and was replaced by St John's Wood, which was on the Stanmore branch of the Bakerloo line. At the time, there were two northern branches of this line: the Stanmore branch and the Watford branch. In 1979, the Jubilee line was opened and replaced the Stanmore branch of the Bakerloo line.

In March 2007, a test was held at the station to allow understanding of how toxic gas might spread throughout London Underground stations and buildings during a terrorist attack. A non-toxic test gas – Sulfur hexafluoride – was released throughout the station, and monitored as it drifted around. The station operated as normal throughout the tests.

== Services ==
St John's Wood station is on the Jubilee line in London fare zone 2. It is between Swiss Cottage to the north and Baker Street to the south. Train frequencies vary throughout the day, but generally operate every 2–5 minutes between 05:54 and 00:18 in both directions. During some events at Lord's Cricket Ground, this station sometimes becomes exit only. Other nearby stations are Maida Vale, Warwick Avenue, Swiss Cottage and Baker Street.

=== Up-lighters ===
Up-lighters are lights that are seen along the escalator as a way to help see and provide light all the way from the street to the platform. It also helps keep the passengers in line with where they are going at all times. The up-lighters date back to 1939 when the station first opened.

== Incidents ==
In the spring of 2021, there was an incident where a passenger was found on the tracks. It led to life-changing injuries and the individual was taken to hospital. There were no grounds for suspicion but police and fire officers were sent to St John’s Wood station in order to investigate the issue. This caused the Jubilee line to be suspended and then it was running on severe delays due to the incident.

== Accessibility ==
There is one gate inward and one gate outward from the Tube that is big enough to fit a buggy or wheelchair. The station is not step free and the only way to access the platforms is by escalator or stairs. Prior to 1993, it was illegal to have a wheelchair anywhere on the London Underground due to fire safety concerns.

== Connections ==
London Buses routes 13, 46, 113, 187 and night route N113 serve the station.

== Nearby points of interest ==
- Abbey Road Studio
- Lord’s Cricket Ground
- MCC Museum
- St John’s Wood Park
- London Central Mosque
- Regents Park
- The Star, former pub in operation since the 1820s, now a gastropub of the Drunch chain

== In popular culture ==
The station appeared in the music video for "Bedsitter" by Soft Cell.

The recording of the underground train heard at the beginning and end of The Jam's 1978 song "Down in the Tube Station at Midnight" was recorded at St John's Wood.

A common trivia question is, "Which London Underground station does not contain any of the letters in the word "mackerel"? The answer is St John's Wood, which does not contain any of the letters A-C-E-K-L-M-R. This is only true because the word "Saint" is always abbreviated "St" in the name, and because Hoxton is on the London Overground but not the Underground. Victoria Coren Mitchell described this as her favourite trivia question. Two former stations also fulfill the mackerel test: Wotton and Wood Siding, which were part of the Underground network between 1933 and 1935.

Preceding station	London Underground	Following station
Swiss Cottage towards Stanmore	Jubilee line	Baker Street towards Stratford
Former services
Swiss Cottage towards Stanmore	Bakerloo line Stanmore branch (1939–1979)	Baker Street towards Elephant & Castle
