= Finchley Road railway station (Metropolitan & St John's Wood Railway) =

Unbuilt London Underground station

Finchley Road
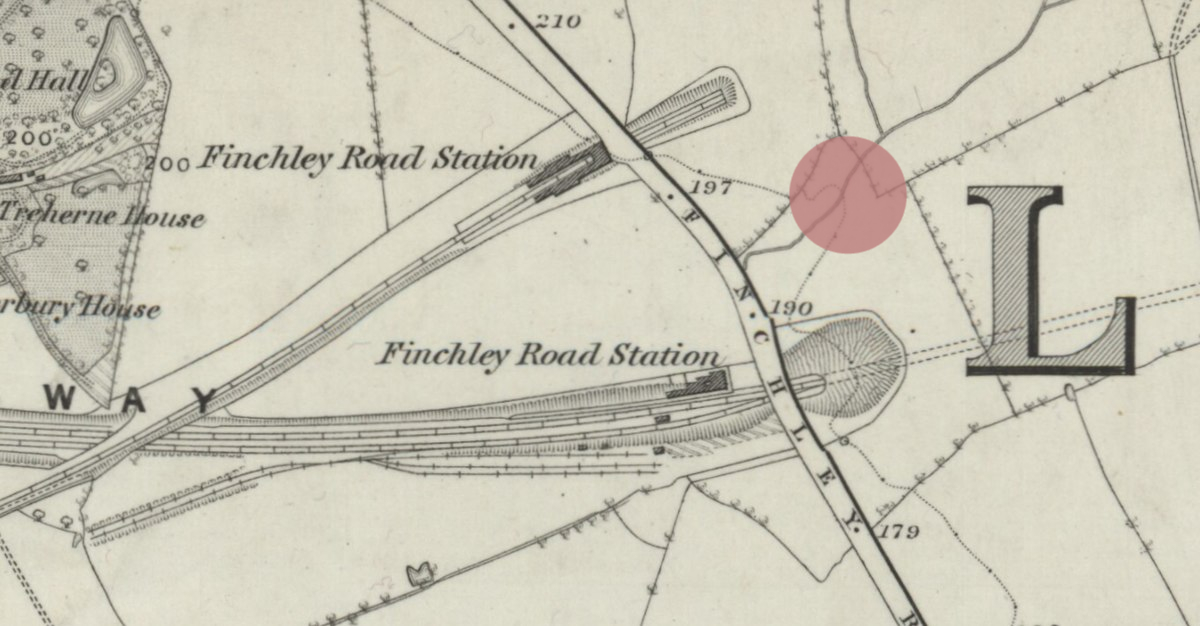
- Proposed location superimposed on Ordnance Survey map

- Location of Finchley Road in Greater London
- Location: Frognal
- Owner: Never built

Railway companies
- Original company: Metropolitan and St John's Wood Railway

Other information
- Coordinates: 51.549771°N 0.180484°W

Finchley Road was an authorised but unbuilt railway station in Frognal, north London planned by the Metropolitan and St John's Wood Railway (M&StJWR).

== Plan ==
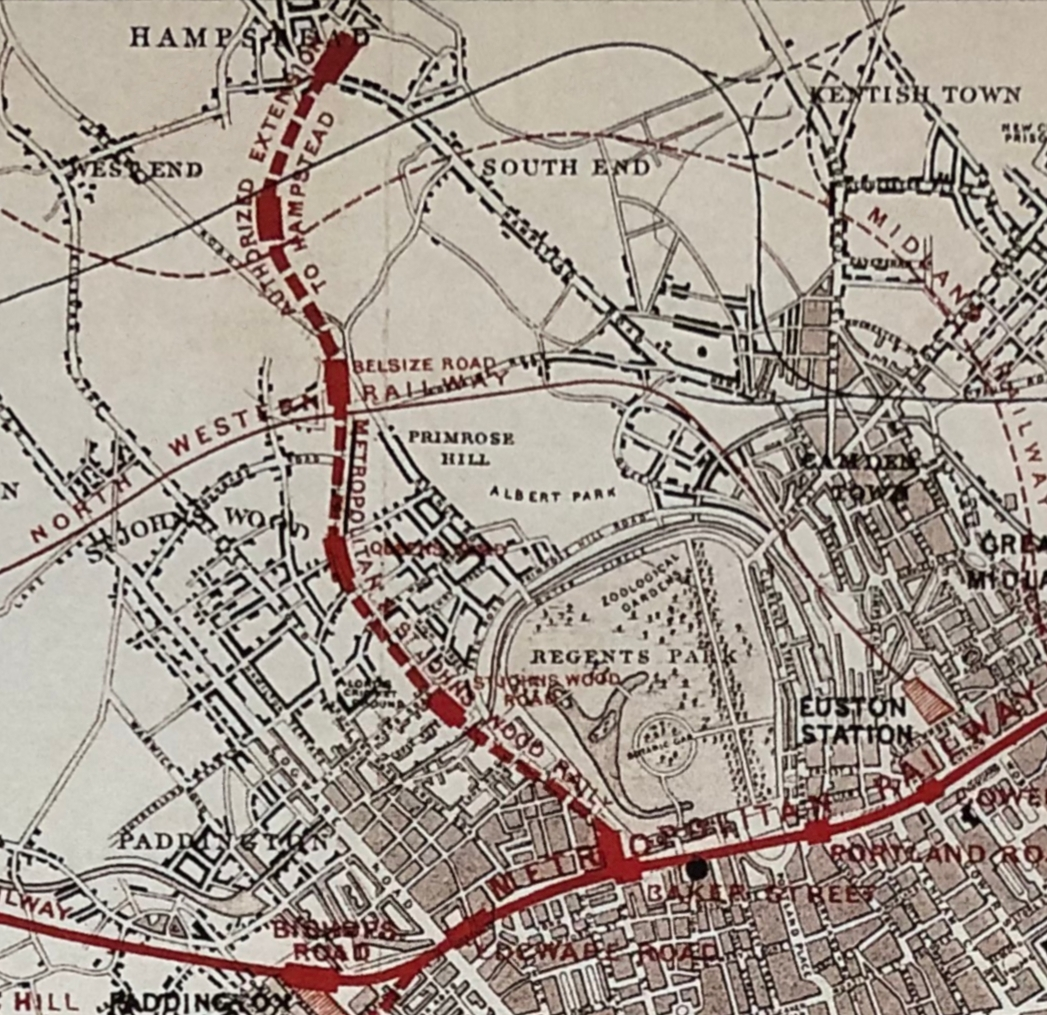
Metropolitan & St John's Wood Railway between Baker Street and Hampstead from a Metropolitan Railway map, circa 1867 (full map)

The M&StJWR had received authorisation in July 1864 to construct a railway from the Metropolitan Railway's (MR's) station at Baker Street to the London and North Western Railway's station at Finchley Road (now Finchley Road and Frognal). The line was to be partly funded and operated by the MR. The station was to be located in what at the time was partly open countryside. Before construction had begun, an extension was authorised in 1865 to the village of Hampstead.

The M&StJWR struggled financially and the plans for the line to Finchley Road and Hampstead were reduced in scope so that it opened in 1868 as a single-track line only as far as Swiss Cottage and the continuation north was postponed. The plan was formally abandoned in 1870. A 156-yard (143 m) section of tunnel built north of Swiss Cottage station in readiness for the continuation towards Hampstead was used for the MR's later extension to the north-west. and a different station of the same name was built further south on Finchley Road. A short length of tunnel on the original alignment was unused. This is still visible today when travelling on a southbound Metropolitan line service.

| | Abandoned plans | |
| Hampstead; Terminus | Metropolitan Railway; Metropolitan and St John's Wood Railway (1864-1870) | Swiss Cottage towards Baker Street |
