= St. John's Wood Church Grounds =

Graveyard in the City of Westminster, London, England

Coordinates: 51.5316°N 0.1690°W

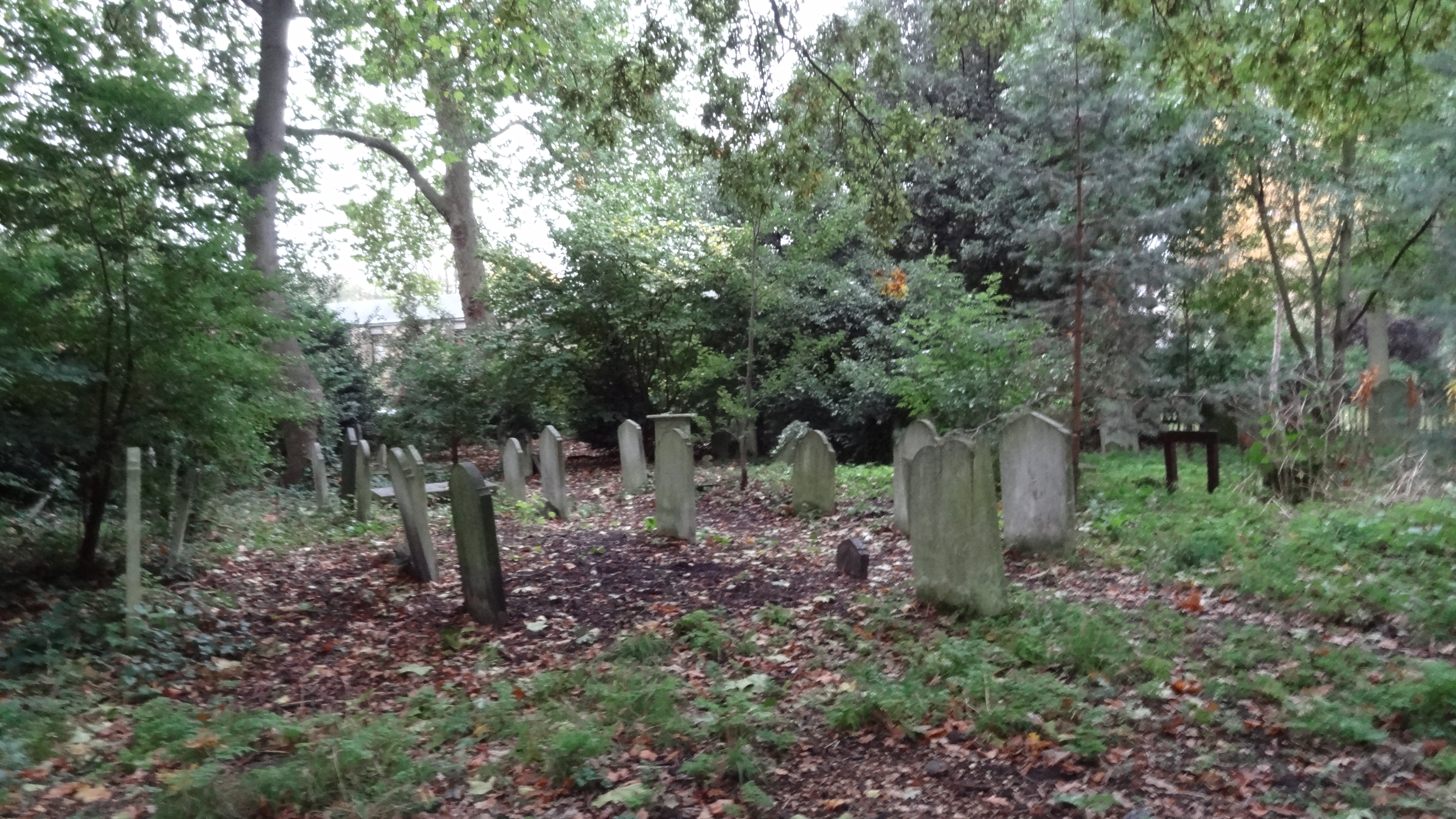
Wildlife area with gravestones

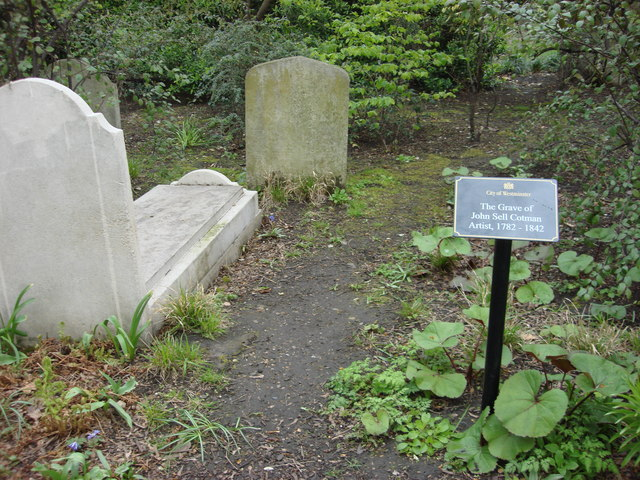
Grave of John Sell Cotman

St John's Wood Church Grounds is a disused graveyard which is now a public park in St. John's Wood in London. It is a Site of Borough Importance for Nature Conservation, Grade 1, and the only Local Nature Reserve in the City of Westminster. Since 2004 it has received the Green Flag Award for excellent green spaces. It is owned and managed by Westminster Council.

== History ==
St. John's Wood was part of the Great Forest of Middlesex in the medieval period. From 1323 the land was owned by the Knights of the Order of St. John, after whom the area is named, but at the Dissolution of the Monasteries it passed to the Crown. In the 1732 the site was sold to Henry Samuel Eyre, and in the 18th century it was agricultural land on two fields called Great Garden Field and Willow Tree Field. The area began to be developed in the 19th century, and St John's Wood Church and burial ground were consecrated in 1814. The burial ground was closed in 1855, and converted to a public garden in 1886. There are thought to be around 50,000 graves, including those of the artist John Sell Cotman and the prophetess Joanna Southcott.

== The grounds ==
The site has formal flower beds, a wildlife area and a children's playground. The wildlife area has hedges, a meadow and woodland in an area mixed with gravestones, and it is a good site for butterflies. It is located opposite Lord's between St John's Wood High Street and Wellington Road.
