= The Star, St John's Wood =

Former pub in London, England

Coordinates: 51.5350°N 0.1687°W

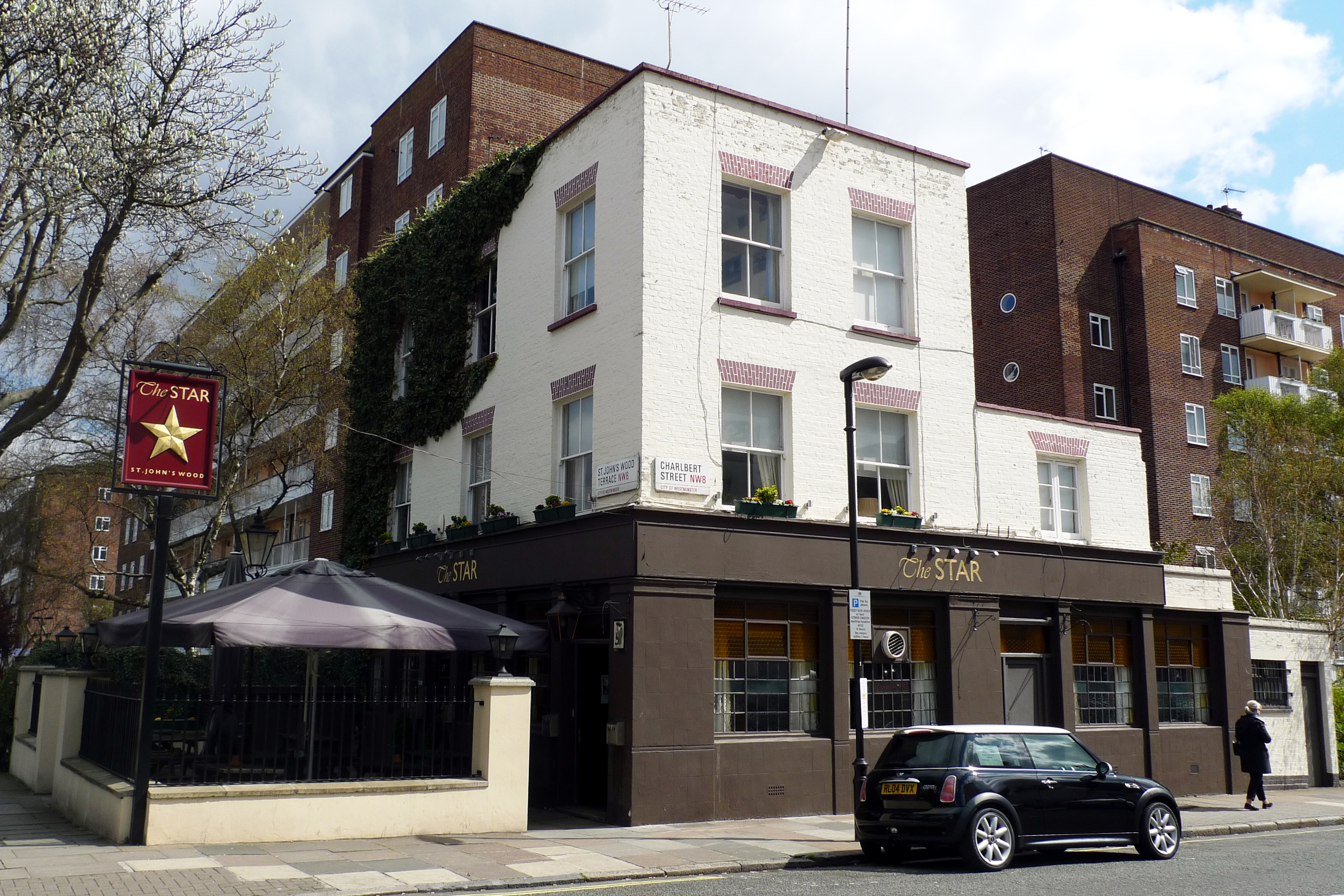
The Star, 2012

The Star was a pub at 38 St John's Wood Terrace in St John's Wood, in the City of Westminster, London. After operating for nearly 200 years it closed in 2015. Following the building being listed by Westminster City Council as an asset of community value (ACV), it reopened in 2017 as a gastropub called Drunch Regent's Park.

== History ==
The pub opened in the 1820s. In July 2013, its then-owner Punch Taverns sold it to a property developer for £2.1 million. When its landlady retired two years later after 20 years in business, the pub closed, and a branch of an estate agents chain opened on the site.

The property developer, Marcus Cooper, through his company West End Investments, had sought permission to convert it into a "single family dwelling", but this was refused by Westminster City Council after they received a petition signed by 800 people and supported by Paul Heaton of pop group The Housemartins, who had filmed the video for their song Happy Hour in The Star in 1986. Following a subsequent public campaign, Westminster City Council granted the premises ACV status to prevent it from being sold without a community consultation. At that time such status did not impose a requirement of planning permission for a change of use of the premises, allowing the estate agents office to be opened in March 2015. Pubs with ACV status gained planning protection in law the following month. In 2017 the building was reopened as a gastropub by the chain Drunch.

In addition to The Housemartins' video, the Star also appeared in the music video for Arctic Monkeys' 2007 single Teddy Picker.
