= Marcus Cooper (property developer) =

British property developer (born c.1966)

- Born: Marcus Simon Cooper c. 1966
- Education: Haberdashers' Aske's Boys' School
- Occupation: Property developer
- Website: http://www.marcuscooper.com

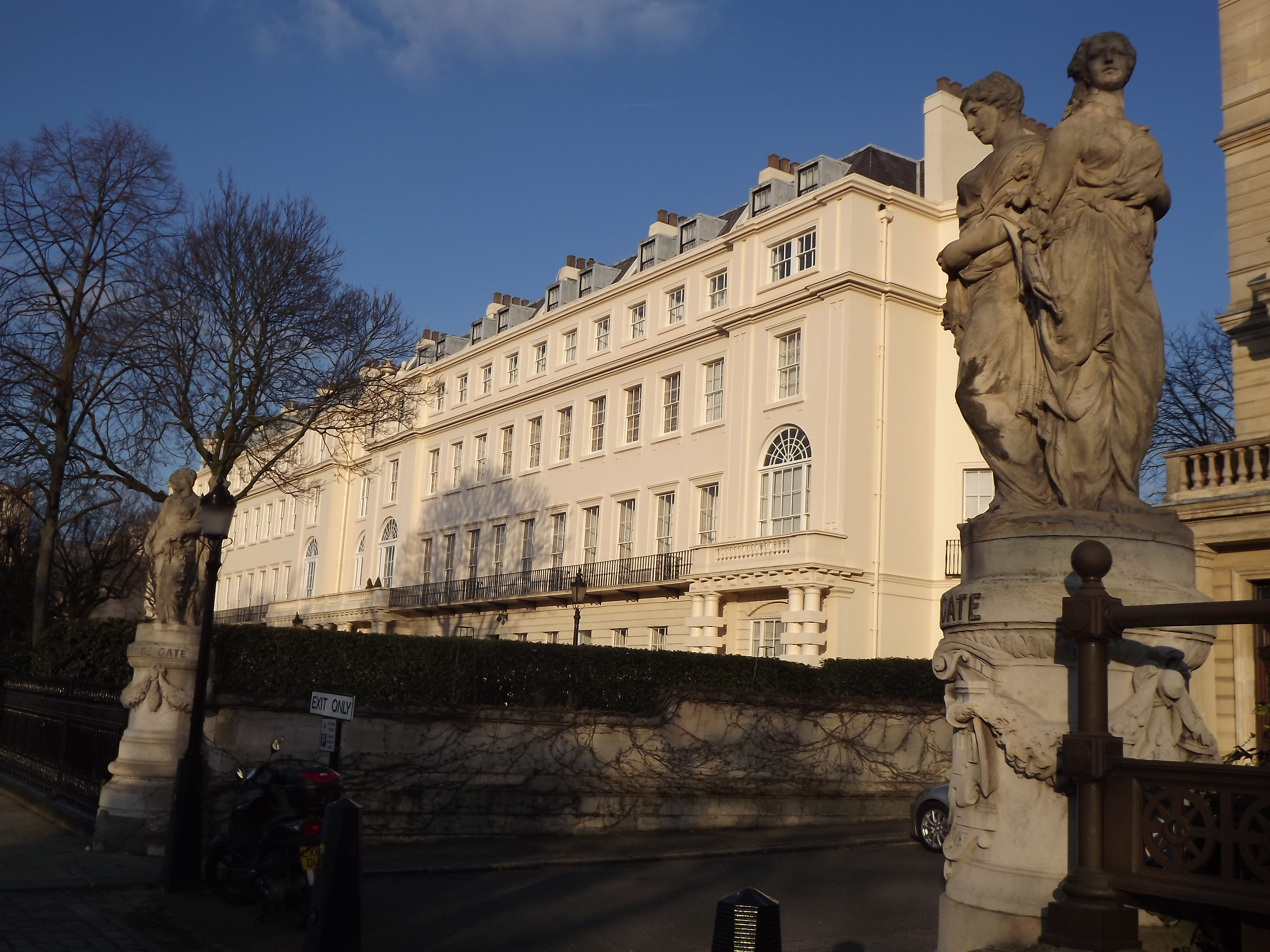
Cambridge Terrace

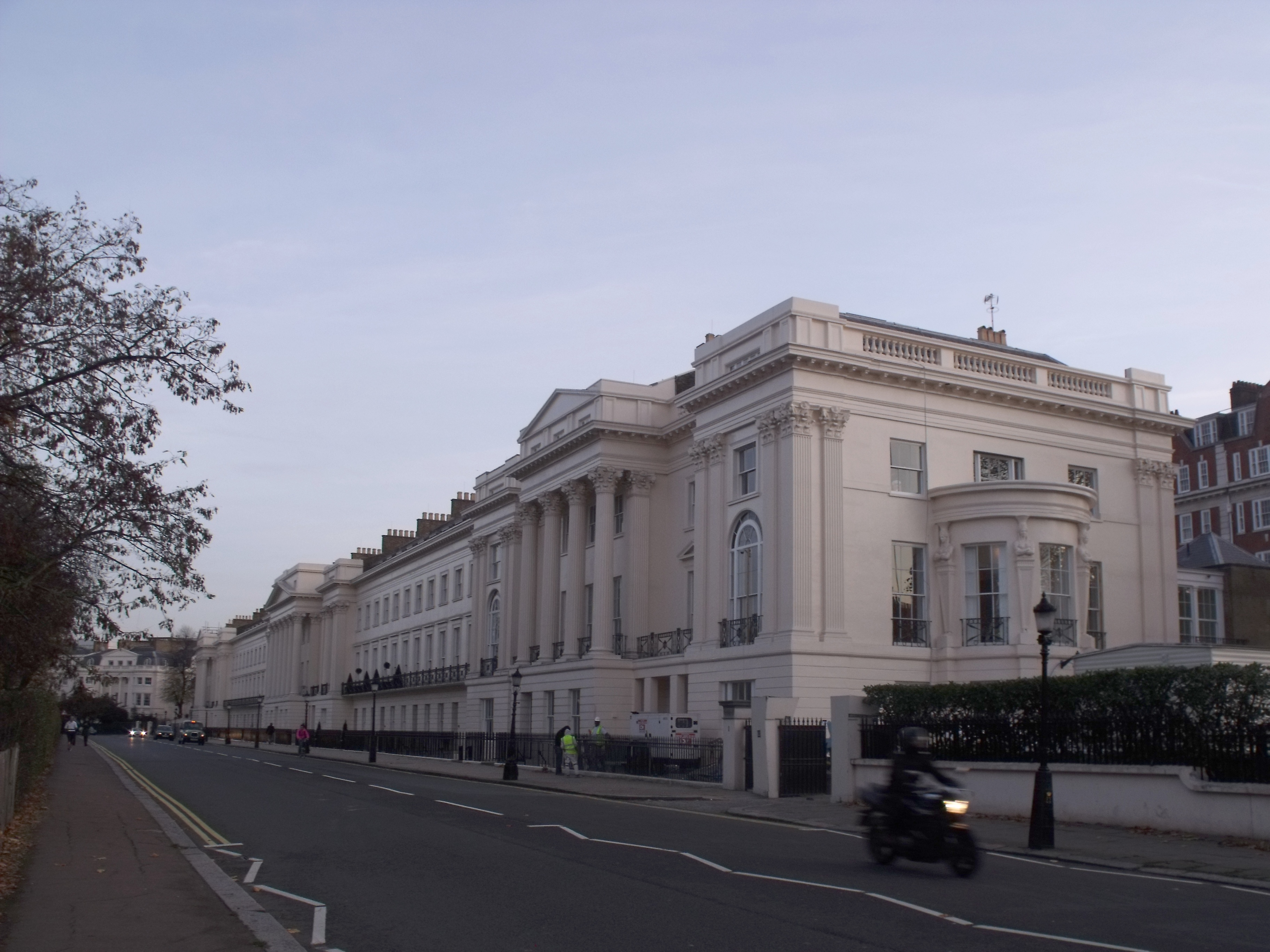
Cornwall Terrace – no.1 is at the right hand end)

Marcus Simon Cooper (born c. 1966) is a British property developer, known for buying and selling several of London's most expensive private houses, including Witanhurst, London's second largest private residence after Buckingham Palace. His companies own over 1000 rental properties, and are undertaking projects that are estimated to have a total end value of £1.5 billion.

== Early life ==
Marcus Simon Cooper was born around 1966. He was educated at Haberdashers' Aske's Boys' School

== Career ==
In 1991, he founded the Marcus Cooper Group, a property developing, trading and investment company. He also runs West End Investments Limited, set up in 2013, from offices at 16 Finchley Road, London NW8.

In 2007 Cooper bought Witanhurst in Highgate, London's second largest private residence after Buckingham Palace, for £30 million, and sold it 2008 for £50 million.

In 2012, the London Evening Standard reported that Cooper's companies owned over 1000 rental properties and "are involved in 50 development projects with an end value of £1.5 billion."

In 2013, Cooper bought the UK's "most expensive terraced house", 1 Cornwall Terrace, for £80 million.

In 2013, Cooper obtained a 150-year lease on five properties at 6–10 Cambridge Terrace and 1–2 Chester Gate, close to Regent's Park, in order to have them combined to create a £200 million seven-storey "supermansion", with 15 bedrooms and 35 bathrooms. In October 2014, The Guardian reported that fellow property developer Christian Candy had bought the "seven Grade I-listed John Nash townhouses" from Cooper for about £100 million, using a British Virgin Islands company.

In July 2013, Cooper's West End Investments bought The Star, St John’s Wood from the pub company Punch Taverns for £2.1 million, and attempted to get planning permission to turn it into a luxury house. This was unsuccessful and it is now an estate agent.

== Political donations ==
In May 2013, Cooper donated £100,000 to the British Conservative Party, in addition to £65,000 previously donated by Cooper and his company.
