= Hampstead railway station (Metropolitan & St John's Wood Railway) =

Unbuilt London Underground station

Hampstead
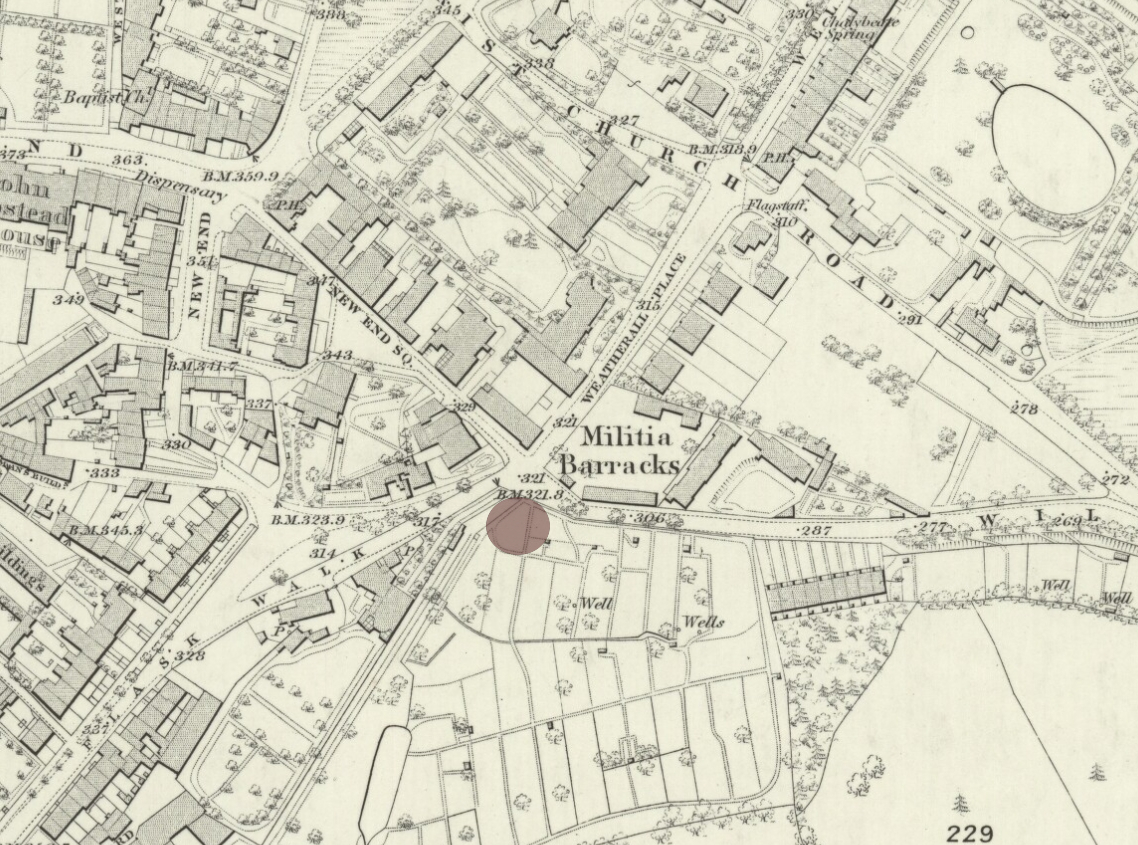
- Proposed location superimposed on Ordnance Survey map

- Location of Hampstead in Greater London
- Location: Hampstead
- Owner: Never built

Railway companies
- Original company: Metropolitan and St John's Wood Railway

Other information
- Coordinates: 51.5578098°N 0.1746429°W

Hampstead was an authorised but unbuilt railway station in Hampstead, north London planned by the Metropolitan and St John's Wood Railway (M&StJWR).

== Plan ==
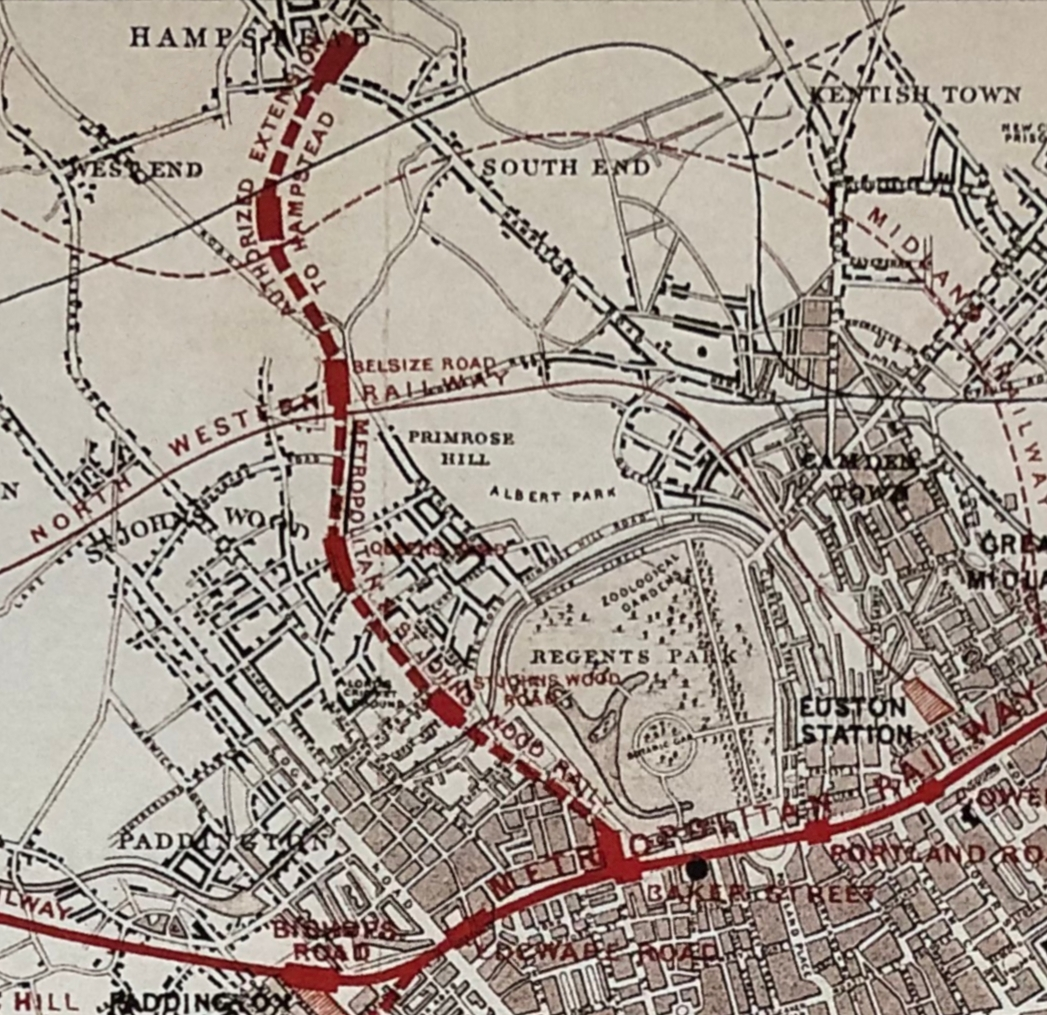
Metropolitan & St John's Wood Railway between Baker Street and Hampstead from a Metropolitan Railway map, circa 1867 (full map)

The M&StJWR had received authorisation in July 1864 to construct a railway from the Metropolitan Railway's (MR's) station at Baker Street to a station near the London and North Western Railway's station at Finchley Road. The line was to be partly funded and operated by the MR.

Before construction had begun, an extension was authorised across mostly open countryside to the village of Hampstead. The station was to be located at the junction of Willow Road, Flask Walk and Weatherall Place (now the south end of Well Walk). The extension was authorised in May 1865. The route between Swiss Cottage and Hampstead included an incline of 1 in 27 (3.7%) for which five special engines were constructed by the MR to deal with the steep grade. (Note: The special engines were 0-6-0T configuration built by the Worcester Engine Company. Not being needed for operations on the rest of the MR, four engines were sold in the 1870s to the Taff Vale Railway and one to the Sirhowy Railway.)

The M&StJWR struggled financially and the plans for the line to Finchley Road were reduced in scope so that it opened in 1868 as a single-track line only as far as Swiss Cottage and the continuation to Finchley Road and Hampstead was postponed. The plan was formally abandoned in 1870. A 156-yard (143 m) section of tunnel built north of Swiss Cottage station in readiness for the line north was used for the MR's later extension to the north-west. A short length northwards was unused. This is still visible today when travelling on a southbound Metropolitan line service.

Separate proposals by other promoters for a line from Swiss Cottage to Alexandra Palace via Hampstead were promoted in 1875 and 1877, but were withdrawn for financial reasons and lack of support from the MR.

== Notes and references ==
=== Bibliography ===
- Jackson, Alan (1986). London's Metropolitan Railway. David & Charles. ISBN 0-7153-8839-8.

	Abandoned plans	
Terminus	Metropolitan Railway; Metropolitan and St John's Wood Railway (1865–1870)	Finchley Road towards Baker Street
