= ARC UK =

British Christian charity

ARC UK

ARC UK is an ecumenical Christian non-profit organization (formerly under the charitable status number 1111651) and has been active since 2006. ARC UK runs projects in which young people from across Europe spend two to four weeks living together during the summer while working as volunteer newcomers and tour guides in a church.

The French acronym 'ARC' demonstrates the three key aspects of the organization: accueil (welcome), rencontre (encounter) and communauté (community).

Participants are provided with accommodation and living expenses, in return for providing free tours in their own language to visitors of their host church. The tours are designed to draw together the historical, artistic and religious aspects of the church, thereby placing it in its spiritual context. ARC also aims to further understanding between young people of different nationalities and Christian traditions. Although participants do not need to be deeply religious or regular churchgoers, it is desirable for them to have an active interest in the sources and expressions of religious faith, particularly as displayed in the buildings of the great Christian churches of Europe.

ARC UK is a branch of the network of ARC organizations which exist in Belgium, France, Germany, Italy, the Netherlands and Spain. ARC has facilitated many projects over the years, including successful projects in St. Paul's Cathedral in London, the Duomo in Florence, Toledo Cathedral, Christ Church Cathedral in Oxford, Westminster Abbey, Reims Cathedral, the Dom in Erfurt and the Basilica di San Marco in Venice. A number of participants are also sent each year to guide on projects run by the ARC sister organisation CASA in France, which, among others, manages projects in Notre Dame Cathedral.

ARC projects can take place in:

ARC projects by year
2008
France	Bordeaux Cathedral, Annecy Cathedral, Grenoble Cathedral, Reims Cathedral, Rouen Cathedral, Paris churches
Germany	Erfurter Dom, Speyer Cathedral
Benelux countries	Notre-Dame Cathedral, Luxembourg, Ghent Cathedral, St. Peter's Church, Leuven
Italy	Florence Cathedral, Basilica di San Marco Venice
UK	Westminster Abbey London, St. Paul's Cathedral London, Christ Church Cathedral Oxford, Winchester Cathedral
Spain	Palencia Cathedral, Toledo Cathedral
2009
France	Church of Saint-Eustache in Paris, Rouen Cathedral, Bordeaux Cathedral, Reims Cathedral, Grenoble Cathedral, Eglise Notre-Dame at Alençon, Poitiers Cathedral, Béziers Cathedral
Germany	Erfurter Dom, Speyer Cathedral
Benelux countries	Notre-Dame Cathedral, Luxembourg, Ghent Cathedral
Italy	Florence Cathedral, Basilica di San Marco Venice
UK	Westminster Abbey London, St. Paul's Cathedral London, Christ Church Cathedral Oxford
Spain	Toledo Cathedral

ARC UK sends English-speaking guides to churches across Europe every summer. Applicants must be aged between 18 and 30. No previous experience or specific expertise are required as full training is provided at a yearly Training Day in London, although an interest in such fields as art, architecture, history or theology might be useful. Knowledge of a European language can be an advantage, but is not always essential.

The charity has as patron the Rt Reverend Christopher Thomas James Chessun, Bishop of Woolwich, who has said:

ARC UK in very practical ways brings communities of young people together to celebrate the rich linguistic and cultural inheritance of Europe and to engage with those who come as visitors to our great cathedrals. I am very glad to support ARC UK as Patron.

Applications for places on projects are made through the ARC UK website. The recruitment period typically begins in January and ends in March, with interviews taking place in late March and throughout April.

ARC is affiliated with the European umbrella organisation Ars et Fides ('Art and Faith'), which is under the patronage of Monsignor Timothy Verdon, Canon of Florence Cathedral and President of the Commission for Ecumenism. In March 2009, ARC UK hosted the annual Autumn Meeting of all ARC Boards as well as the Ars et Fides Conference - an international ecumenical event that took place in Cambridge.
