= Wellington Hospital, London =

Wellington Hospital
- Hospital Corporation of America
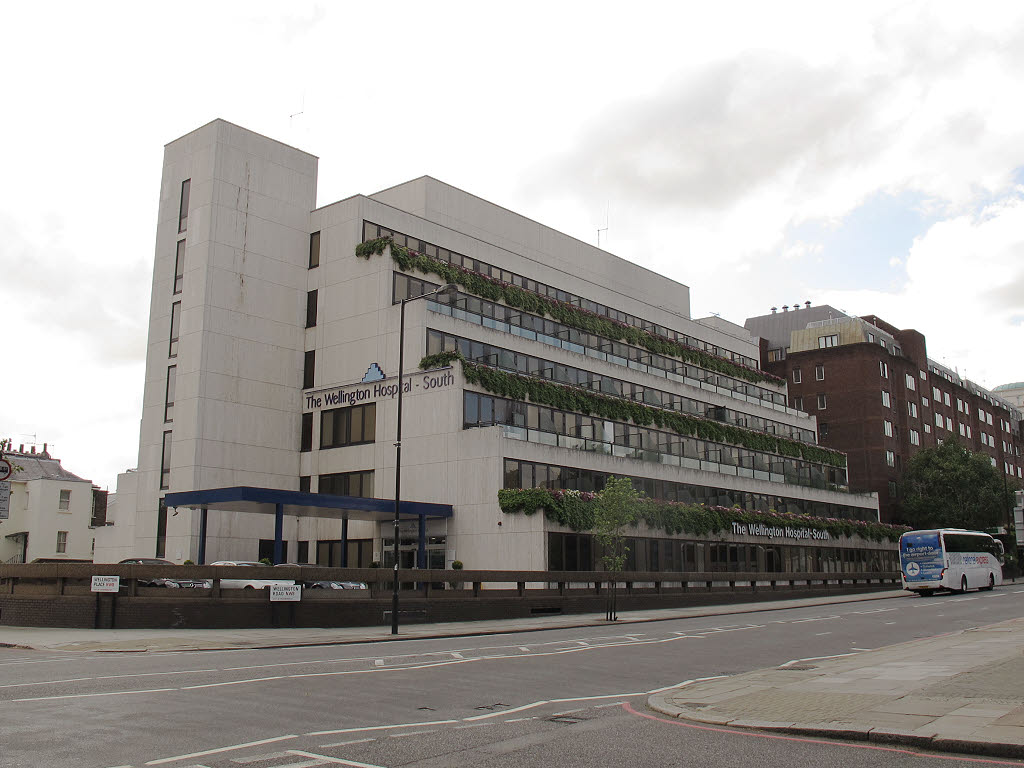
- Wellington Hospital South Building

- Location in Westminster

Geography
- Location: London, NW8; United Kingdom
- Coordinates: 51.5325°N 0.1726°W

Organisation
- Care system: Private
- Type: Specialist

Services
- Emergency department: No

Helipads
- Helipad: No

History
- Founded: April 1974

Links
- Website: www.thewellingtonhospital.com

The Wellington Hospital in St John's Wood, London is the largest private hospital in the United Kingdom, and owned by the American company, HCA Healthcare. It offers cardiac services, neurosurgery, liver and HPB medicine, rehabilitation, gynaecology, orthopaedics, and other services. It comprises a South Building, a North Building and a Diagnostics and Outpatients Centre as well as the Platinum Medical Centre, which specialises in oncology.

== History ==
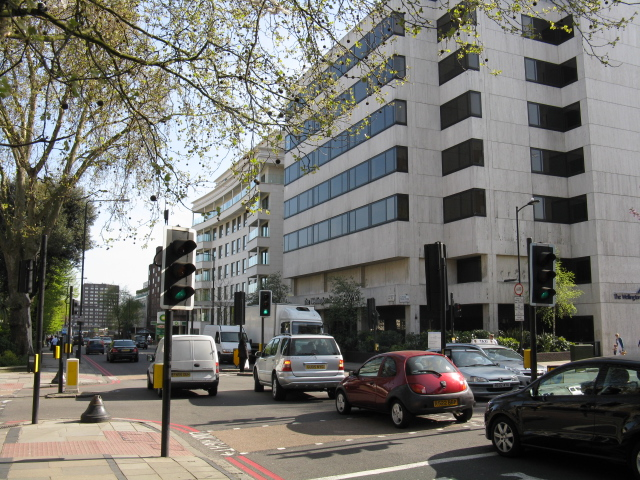
Wellington Hospital North Building

Originally commissioned by British and Commonwealth Holdings, the Wellington Hospital was founded by Dr Arthur Levin who wanted to create a modern flagship private hospital. The South Building, which was designed by Fred Woodhead, opened in April 1974. The North Building, also designed by Fred Woodhead, opened in 1978. The Wellington Diagnostics and Outpatients Centre at Golders Green opened in 2007 and the Platinum Medical Centre, which includes an oncology centre with MRI and PET CT scanners, opened in May 2011.

== Notable patients ==
- John Spencer, 8th Earl Spencer, British peer and the father of Diana, Princess of Wales died at the hospital in March 1992.
- Sir Robin Day, the broadcaster, died at the hospital in August 2000.
- Taylor Hawkins, Foo Fighters drummer, was admitted to the hospital when he overdosed on heroin during their London tour in July 2001.
- Richard Burns, rally driver and winner of the 2001 World Rally Championship, died at the hospital aged 34 from complications of an astrocytoma brain tumour on 25 November 2005, exactly 4 years after winning the title.
- Prince Friso of Orange-Nassau, a member of the Dutch Royal Family, who, after being buried under an avalanche in Lech while skiing in Austria, was admitted to the hospital on 1 March 2012. He died on 12 August 2013 in the Netherlands.
- Peter O'Toole died at the hospital on 14 December 2013.

== See also ==
- List of hospitals in England
- The Lister Hospital, London
