= O2 Centre =

Shopping and entertainment centre in London

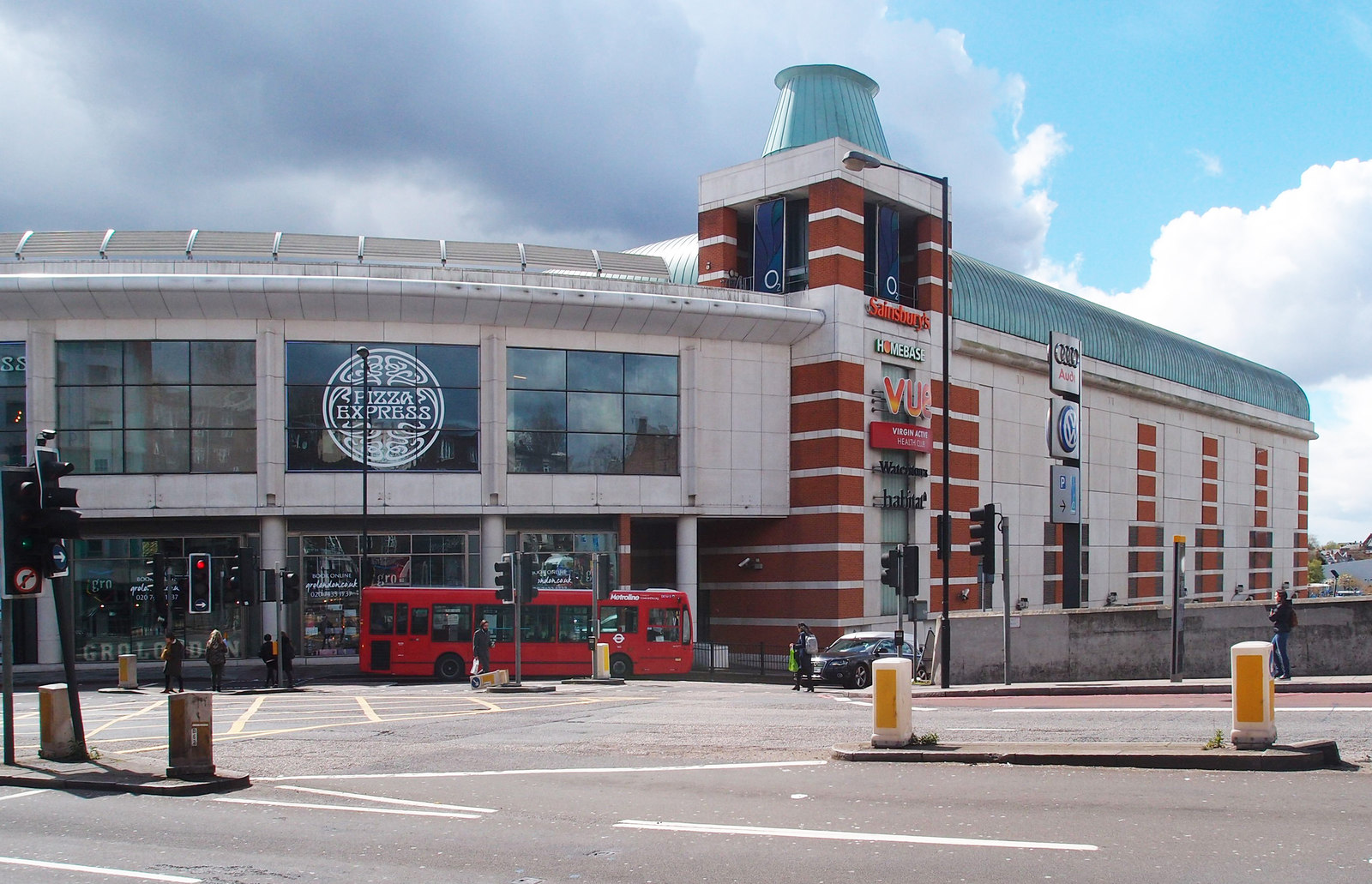
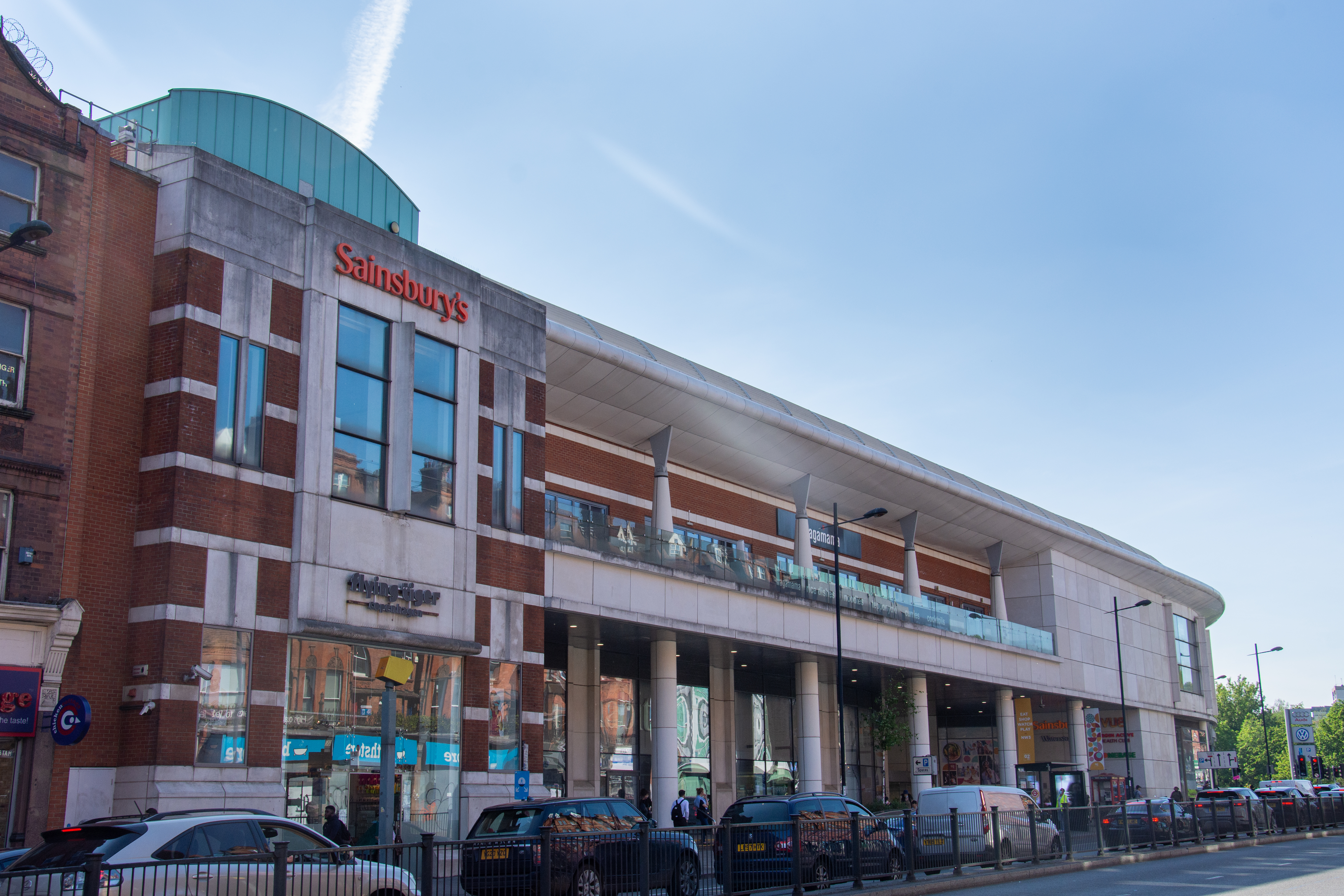
- Top to bottom: East and front side of the O2 Centre.
- Location: 255 Finchley Road, London
- Coordinates: 51.5480°N 0.1816°W
- Opened: 1998; 28 years ago
- Owner: Landsec
- Architect: HOK International
- Parking: 518 cars
- Website: o2centre.co.uk

The O2 Centre is an indoor shopping and entertainment centre located on Finchley Road in north-west London, near Hampstead, England.

Designed by HOK International and opened in 1998, it is now owned by Landsec. Despite the same name and originally very similar logo, it is no relation to the O2 telecommunications brand, which was launched four years later. The name was chosen as reference to the spacious feel of the building, as O_{2} is the chemical formula for dioxygen.

== History ==
The pre-development O2 Centre site with the modern boundary marked in red (1957)

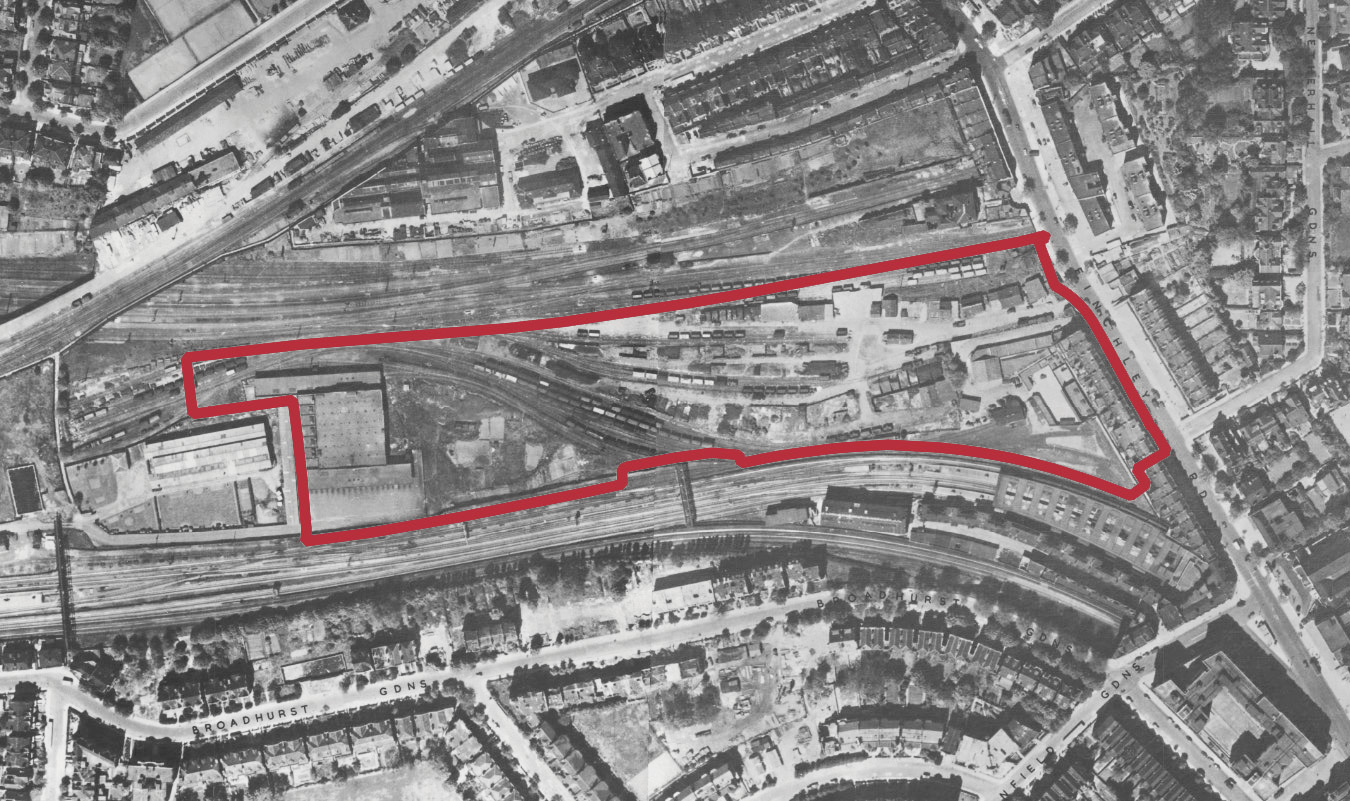
The same site in a 1946 RAF aerial photo

=== Development ===
The opening of the centre in 1998 came after many years of the site remaining derelict. In the early 1990s, the buildings along Finchley Road were demolished in preparation for the centre, but problems with planning permission, with concerns over traffic in particular, led to construction being delayed by many years. A great deal of consultation took place with local residents, including asking them to vote from a choice of three designs for the exterior of the building, relating to different kinds of periodic elements, and asking them to suggest a name. The O2 Centre opened with London's largest branch of Sainsbury's at the time, and a Warner Village cinema (now Vue). The Observer reported in 1999 that, at the time, the building was "quiet" and that "people don't seem to know it's there".

The centre was originally developed by the Burford Group and Capital & Regional's X-Leisure fund, who had joint ownership. In 2004, X-Leisure bought out Burford's share for £25 million (about £42 million in 2024). X-Leisure itself was bought out by Landsec in 2013, but not before it had sold off the O2 Centre to property partnership Matterhorn Capital in 2009 for £92.5 million (about £135 million in 2024). One year later, Landsec bought back the O2 Centre from Matterhorn for £126 million (about £181 million in 2024).

The original £15m budget for the build was exceeded in early 1997, causing a temporary delay in the build until additional capital investors could be found.

The centre contains a Sainsbury's, Aldi, Vue Cinema, Virgin Active, Waterstones, as well as a Nandos.

=== Proposed closure ===
In November 2020, following the COVID-19 pandemic, Landsec announced it intended to sell over £4bn of assets in the next four to five years. In December 2020, Landsec announced it would be closing the O2 Centre, which would be demolished for 1,800 new homes to be built, with some retail included, in the future. In March 2023, the first phase of the redevelopment plans were approved by the Camden London Borough Council's local planning authority.

== Transport ==
The closest London Underground station to the centre is Finchley Road, 100 yards south. Finchley Road & Frognal station served by the London Overground is a short walk away while West Hampstead Thameslink railway station, West Hampstead railway station and West Hampstead tube station are also in close proximity, accessed by walking along B510 West End Lane, to Blackburn Road to connect to a pedestrian and cycle path to the car park, next to the Homebase.

There are several bus and coach routes that stop right outside the O2 Centre including 13, 113, 187 and 268. Also close by on West End Lane are C11, 31, 46, 139, 328 and 603 bus stops. Local night buses are N113.

The redevelopment plans include a proposal to add a new entrance from the site to the Finchley Road tube station, potentially including making the station fully accessible.
