= 1993 Finchley Road bombings =

Provisional IRA attack in London, England

Coordinates: 51°33′55″N 0°11′47″W

- Part of the Troubles
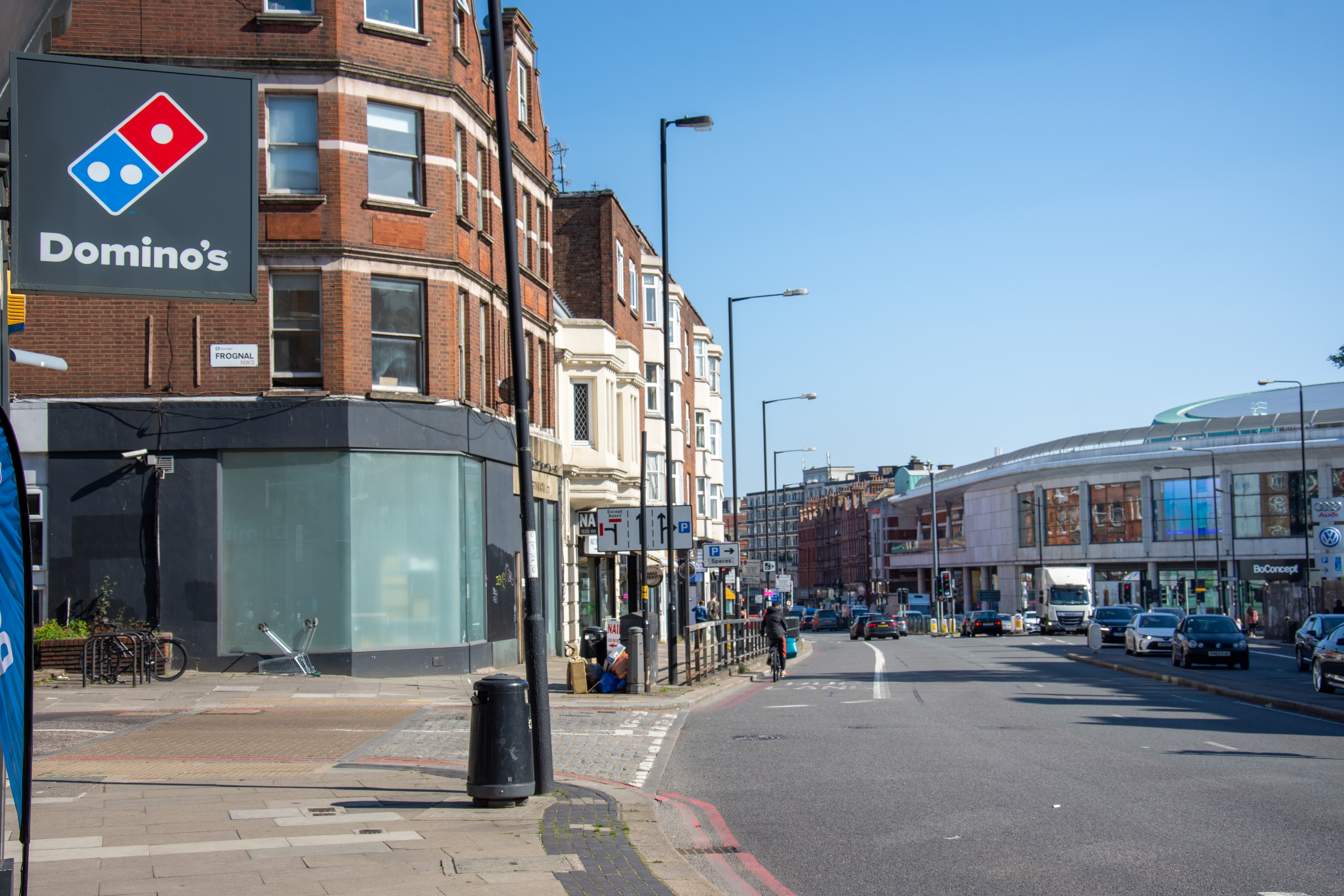
1	Domino's Pizza Finchley Road
2	Golders Green
- Location: Finchley Road, Hampstead, London, England
- Date: 2 October 1993; 00:26 (UTC)
- Target: Civilians
- Attack type: Time bombs
- Deaths: 0
- Injuries: 5
- Perpetrator: Provisional Irish Republican Army

The Finchley Road bombings occurred on 2 October 1993, when the Provisional Irish Republican Army (IRA) detonated three time bombs on Finchley Road in north London, England. Telephoned warnings were sent six minutes beforehand, at approximately 00:26 UTC, but five people were injured from falling glass as a result of the blasts, and damage was caused to some shops and flats in the surrounding area. The three bombs were planted outside a Domino's Pizza restaurant, a travel agent, and offices of the St. Pancras Building Society. Later, anti-terrorist officers discovered and subsequently safely detonated a fourth bomb in a controlled environment, 1 mile (1.6 km) north of the initial bombings, in Golders Green. Two days later, on 4 October, the IRA detonated four more bombs in north London, two in Tottenham Lane and two more in Archway Road resulting in four injuries.

The bombings were branded as "cowardly" by Home Secretary Michael Howard. They were the first IRA bombings in the capital for over five months. Following the bombings, the IRA phoned a Dublin radio station claiming responsibility for the attack.

== Background ==
The IRA had carried out many bomb attacks on military and civilian targets in England since the beginning of its campaign in the 1970s. These attacks were carried out with a goal of putting pressure on the British government to withdraw from Northern Ireland. In early 1993, the Northern Ireland peace process was at a delicate stage, with attempts to broker an IRA ceasefire ongoing. In 1994, talks were continuing between the two largest Irish nationalists in Northern Ireland; John Hume of the Social Democratic and Labour Party (SDLP), and Gerry Adams of Sinn Féin (SF). There was a high risk of IRA attacks in London in light of the refusal of political talks between the British prime minister, John Major and Sinn Féin, and all British police forces were told to remain prepared for further attacks. In the week after the attack, the Conservative Party was due to host their annual conference. Just over seven months earlier, on 27 February 1993, the IRA detonated a similar bomb in Camden Town, injuring 18 people. Prior to the Finchley Road bombings, there had not been any IRA attacks in London since the 1993 Bishopsgate bombing just over five months earlier.

== Bombings ==
At 00:20 UTC on 2 October 1993, a telephone warning was sent to a Domino's Pizza on Finchley Road, a major dual carriageway in north London. Six minutes later, at 00:26, one bomb was detonated outside the Domino's Pizza restaurant. At 00:30, another bomb was detonated outside a travel agency and the final bomb was detonated outside the offices of the St. Pancras Building Society. The three blasts injured four men and one woman in their twenties, with all injuries caused by falling glass. Police sealed off Finchley Road from Swiss Cottage to West End Lane. A fourth bomb was then found and subsequently defused by anti-terrorism officers a mile north of Finchley Road in Golders Green. All of the bombs had been placed in doorways. As a result of the blasts, dozens of shops were damaged. Following the bombing, the IRA phoned a Dublin radio station and claimed responsibility for the attacks.

== Investigation and aftermath ==
An artist's impression of the blast suspect

Home Secretary Michael Howard branded the attacks as "cowardly and contemptible". Chief Superintendent of the Metropolitan Police Tony Buchanan called the attack "murderous", citing that there had been "no opportunity whatever to effect an evacuation". He also condemned the telephone warnings as "totally inadequate" claiming that there was "every possibility a large number of people could've been seriously injured". The five people injured were sent to the Royal Free Hospital, and discharged the next day. The IRA said the bombings had been carried out by a number of active service units. On 2 October, police confirmed the locations of the bombings, and also noted that the effects of the bombings could have been much worse had it not been for a bus arriving early to collect passengers. On 4 October, police issued an artist's impression of a suspect for the blast, who was said to be wearing a duffel coat-type garment with distinctive yellow bands around it.

== See also ==
- 1993 Harrods bombing
- London Hilton bombing
- 1996 Hammersmith Bridge bombing
