= Finchley Road =

Dual carriageway in North London

Coordinates: 51°33′55″N 0°11′47″W

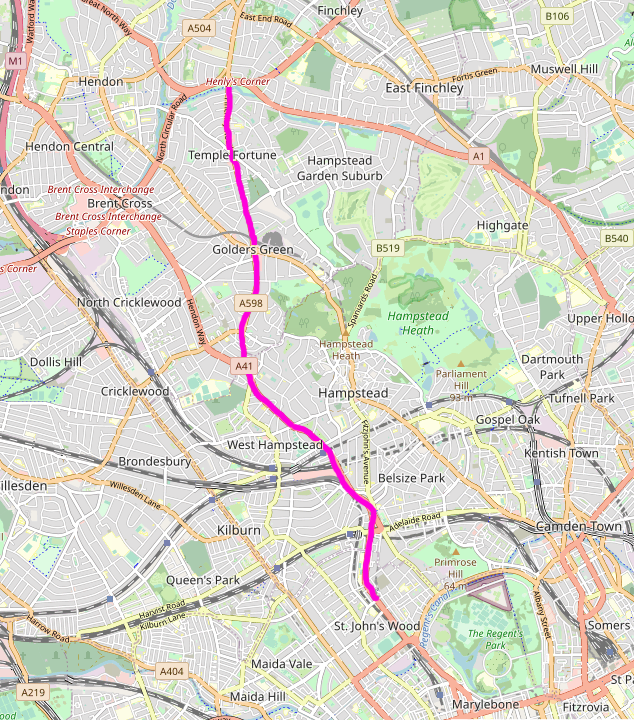
A map showing the full length of Finchley Road (labelled in pink)

Finchley Road is a designated 4.5-mile (7-kilometre) arterial road in north-west London, England. Finchley Road starts in St John's Wood near central London as part of the A41; its southern half is a major dual carriageway with high traffic levels often frequented by lorries and long-distance coaches as it connects central London, via the A41 Hendon Way, to the M1 motorway at Brent Cross and other roads at that interchange.

Its northern half, which dissects away from the A41 and is designated as the A598, runs through suburban areas via the centre of Golders Green to Henlys Corner, where the road north of it leads to Finchley, from which Finchley Road gets its name.

Its southern half, in which it gives its name to the centre-west part of Hampstead, has two current railway stations including the name Finchley Road. London Buses route 13 runs through the entire road, while the route 113 runs only in its southern half.

== History ==
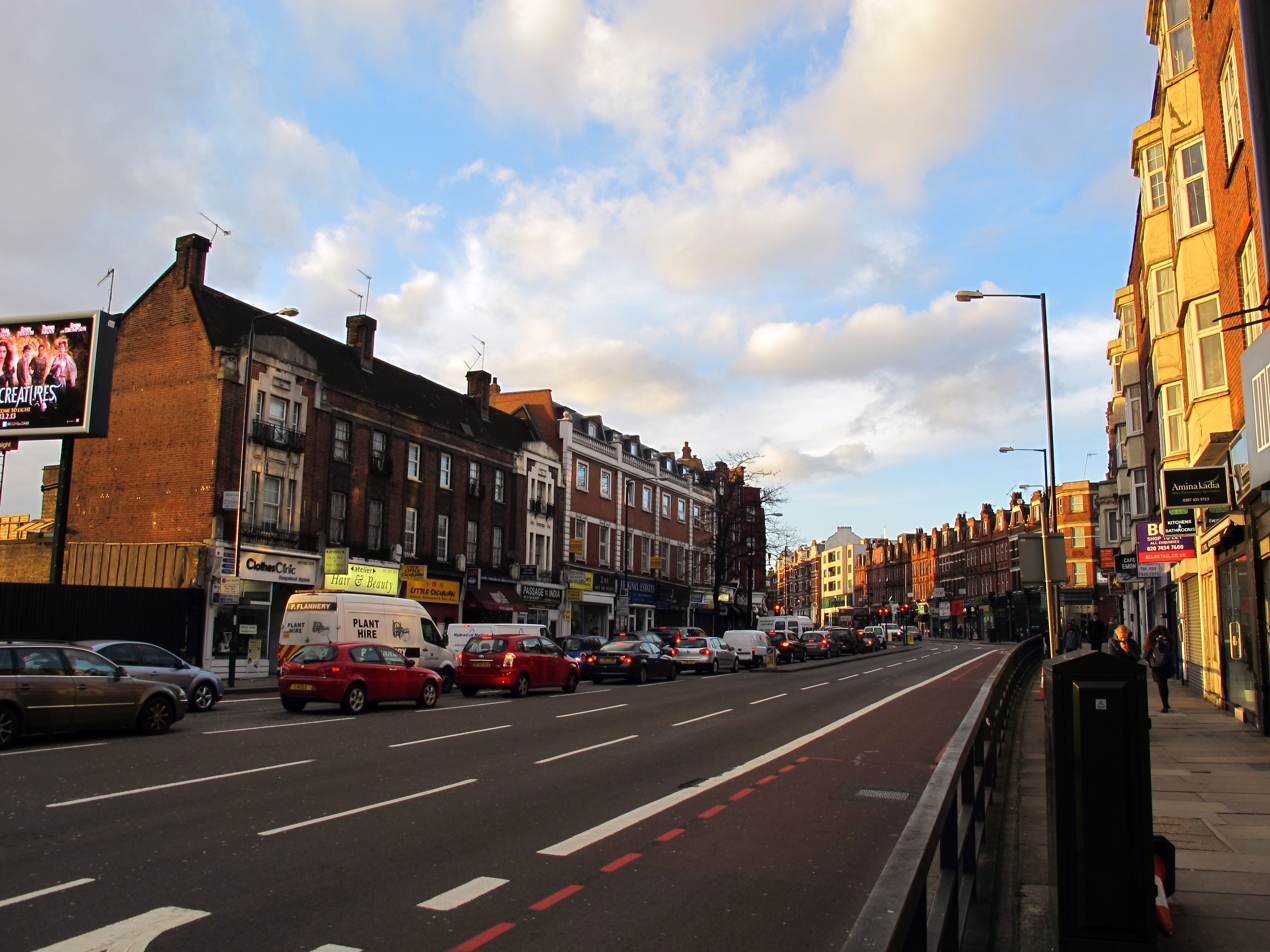
Lower Finchley Road in Hampstead

Originally named Finchley New Road, it was built as a turnpike to provide an alternative to the hillier route north from London, which ran further east through the village of Hampstead.

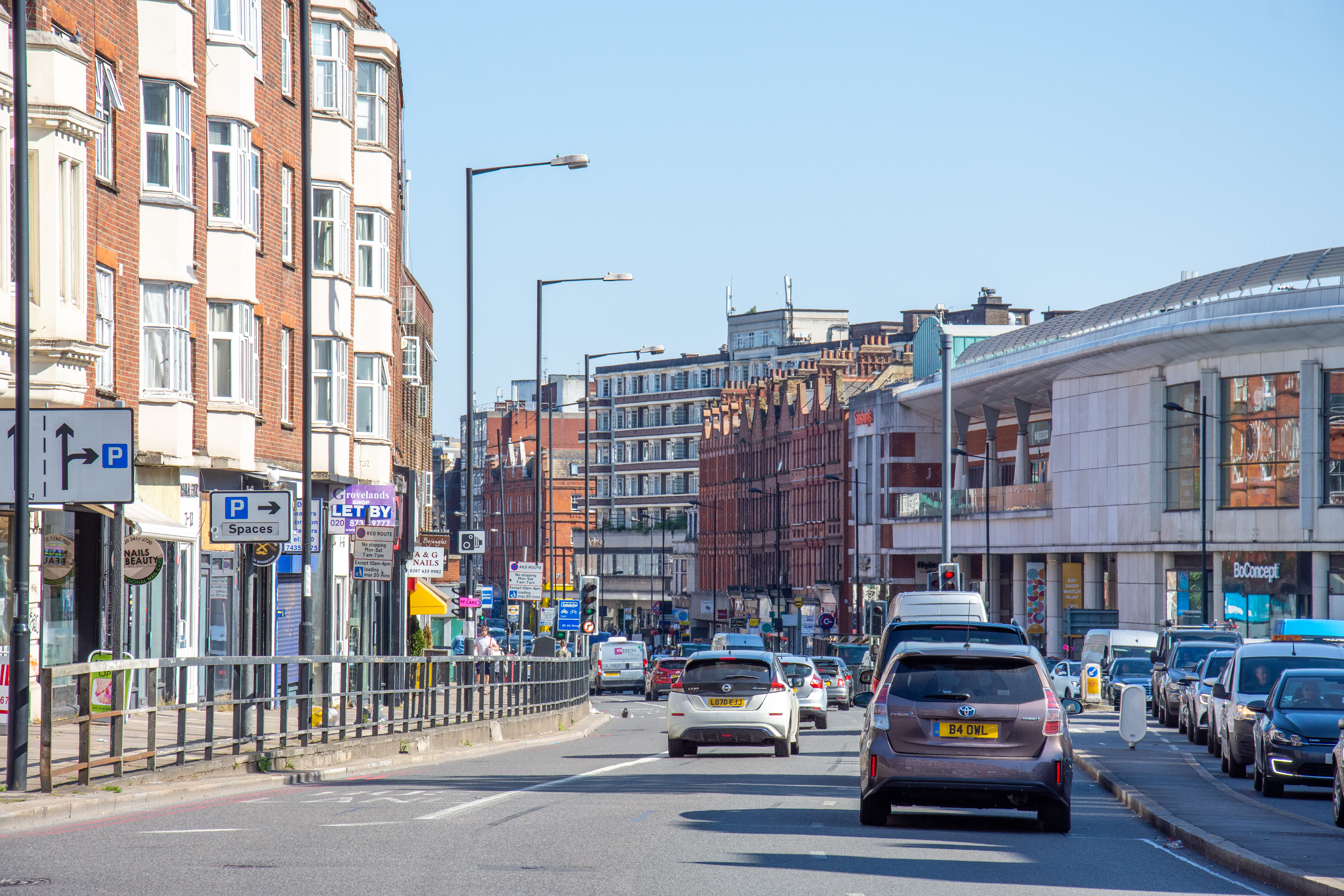
Looking south on lower Finchley Road towards the O2 Centre

The original route, now the A502, ran from Camden Town along what is now Chalk Farm Road, Haverstock Hill, Rosslyn Hill, Heath Street and North End Road to Golders Green where it joins Finchley Road. It had two steep hills either side of Hampstead Village, and was difficult for horses with carriages to negotiate when muddy. The Finchley Road Act was passed in 1826 and the new turnpike road was completed in 1835.

The new route (now the A41) started from what was then called the 'New Road' (the first London bypass) and is now Marylebone Road, and ran north, first along what are now Park Road and Wellington Road, and becomes Finchley Road at St John's Wood tube station. It goes north through Swiss Cottage, then turns slightly north west, forming an unofficial boundary between Hampstead and West Hampstead, and then turns north again at Child's Hill. The A41 diverges westward and Finchley Road becomes the A598. It continues past Golders Green Underground station (where it meets the old route), through Temple Fortune to the North Circular Road, crossing it at Henlys Corner, where it becomes Regents Park Road (perhaps after the southern end of the route). This continues as Ballards Lane through Finchley Central to North Finchley. There it joins the former Great North Road (now the A1000).

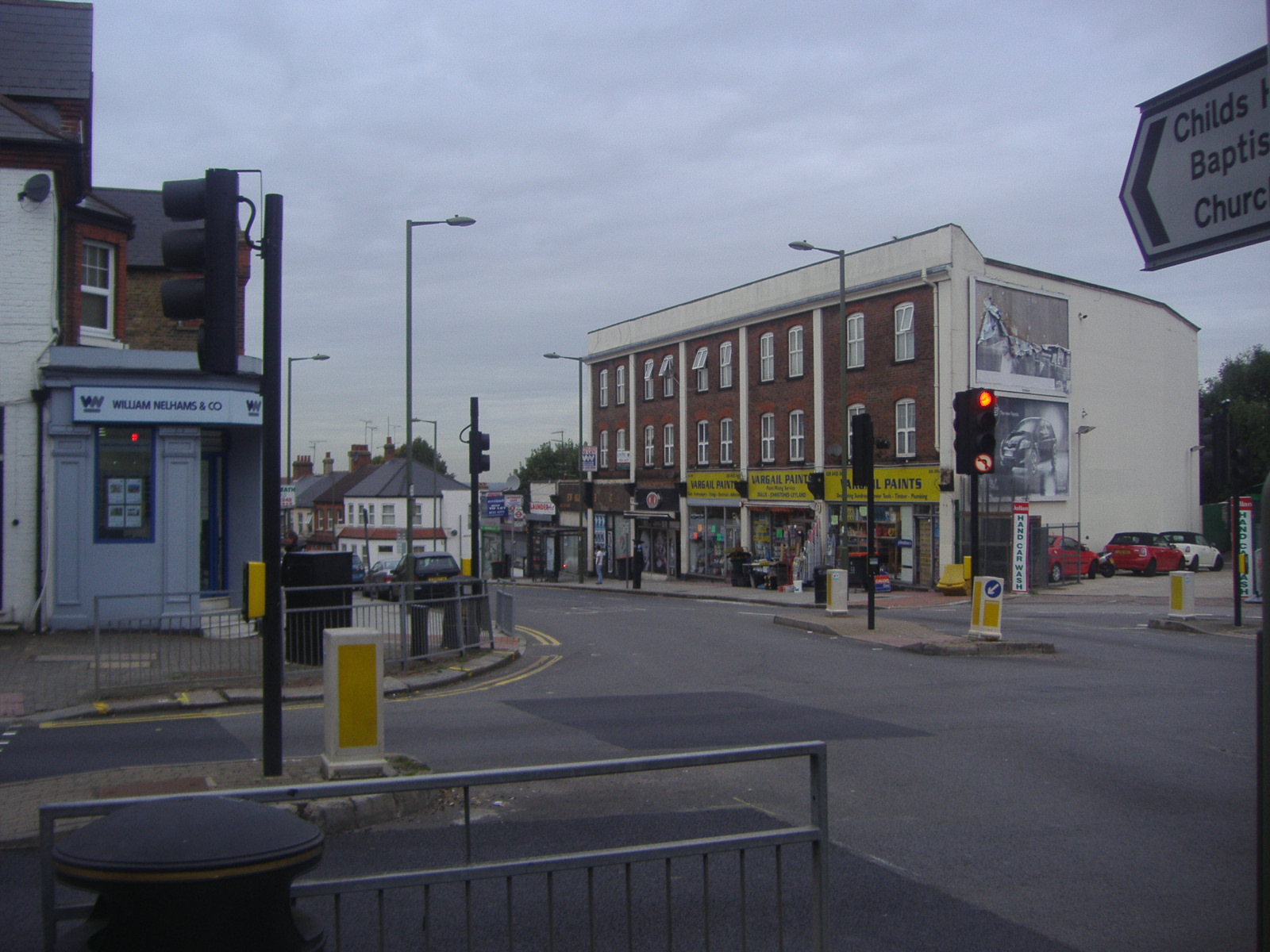
Junction of Finchley Road and Cricklewood Lane in Childs Hill, in upper Finchley Road

Tolls were collected at a tollgate at Childs Hill.

After the road was built, many grand houses were built along its length, especially near Fortune Green, Childs Hill and Golders Green.

By 1940, there were approximately 14,000 Jewish refugees living in the area, some of whom established businesses along Finchley Road. During the Second World War, bus conductors would call out "Finchleystrasse – passports please!" as they pulled up on the road, due to the high number of German speakers there.

Finchley Road remains a heavily used route in and out of London. The most commercial part of the road is between Swiss Cottage Underground station and the O2 Centre.

Stagecoaches, first omnibuses and shelved tramway proposal

In 1856 as many as ten stagecoaches a day ran along Finchley Road, serving Swiss Cottage, where the Atlas Line, a business of these, had started about six years before.

Omnibuses reached the area north of Swiss Cottage by way of Finchley Road as far as Finchley Road station before 1880. Later omnibuses were extended along Finchley Road to meet others from Edgware Road along West End Lane, continuing north to Childs Hill and Hendon. Motorbuses had replaced horse omnibuses by 1911.

Plans for an extensive network of tramways, along Adelaide and Finchley Roads, were dropped after opposition from the council, ground landlords, and residents.

On 2 October 1993 five people were injured and damage caused when three bombs planted by the Provisional IRA exploded.

== Local railway stations ==
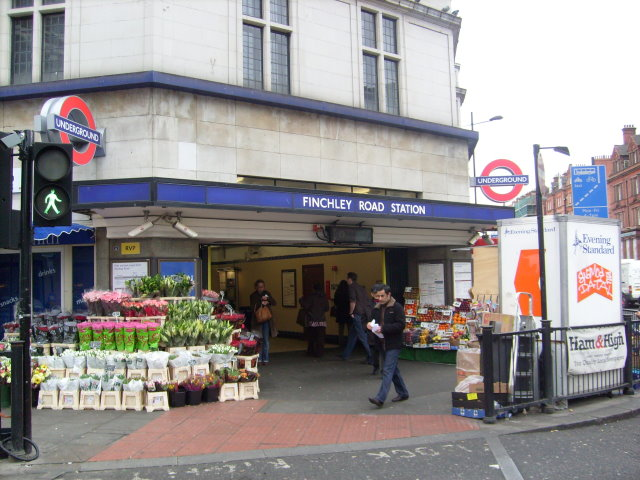
Finchley Road Tube Station in 2008

=== Today ===
Hampstead is served by Finchley Road Underground station (Jubilee and Metropolitan lines) and, 435 meters further north, Finchley Road & Frognal London Overground station (Mildmay line). The road has as such become the colloquial name for the part of Hampstead between West Hampstead and Hampstead-on-the-Hill which is centred on Hampstead Underground station (Northern line).

=== Historically ===
St John's Wood was served by Finchley Road railway station on the Midland Main Line (1868–1927).

== Memorials ==
In 1906, a stone plaque was affixed at 139 Finchley Road by Charles Wells, to commemorate the site of residence of 19th century German operatic signer Thérèse Tietjens.

A plaque marking the site of the Cosmo restaurant was unveiled in 2013 by the Association of Jewish Refugees. The venue, which was open from 1937 to 1998, was a popular meeting place for Jews who had fled from persecution in Central and Eastern Europe.
