= Swiss Cottage =

Area of Hampstead in London, England

Coordinates: 51.5424°N 0.1734°W

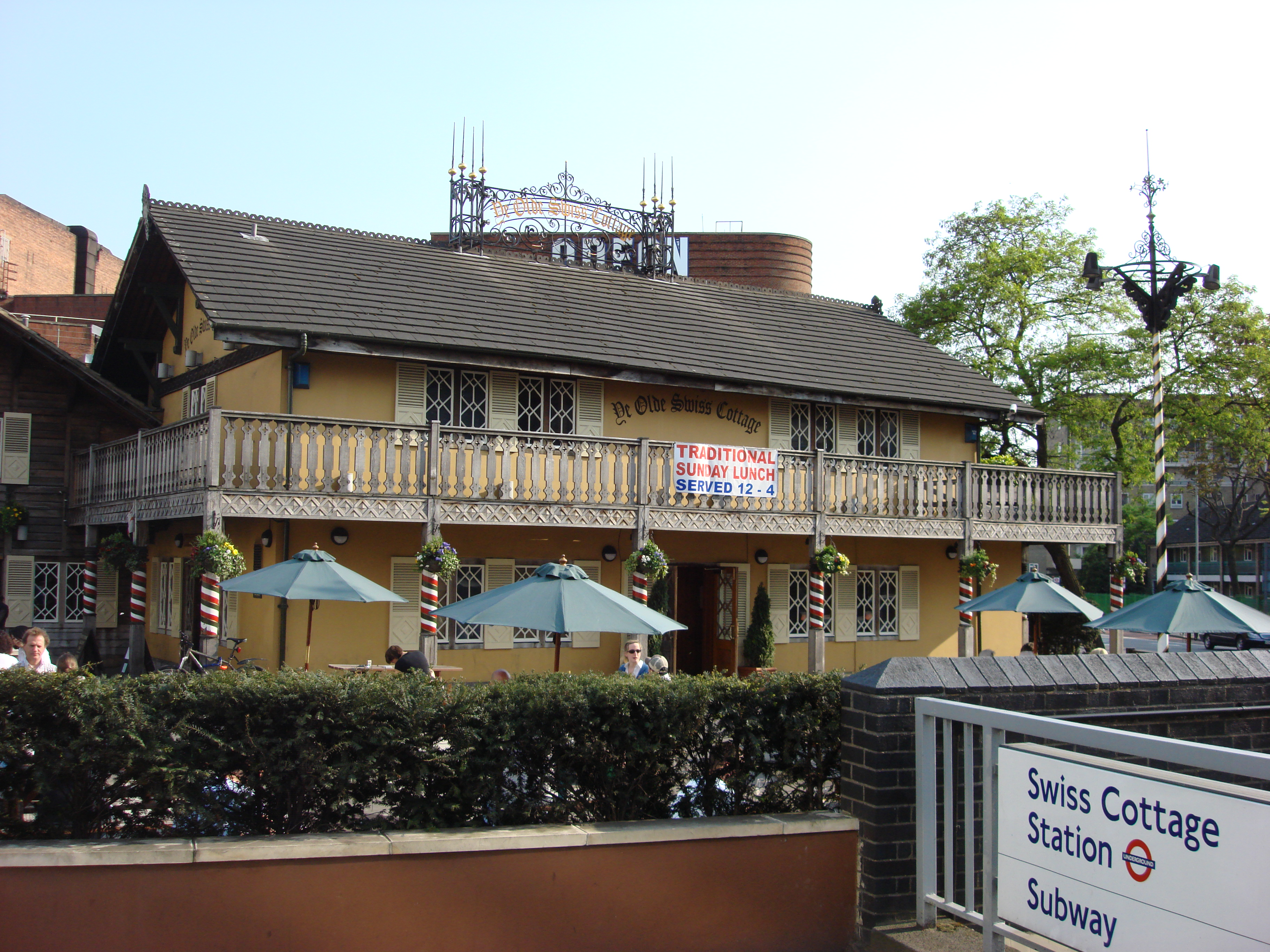
- Ye Olde Swiss Cottage public house in 2007

- Location within Greater London
- OS grid reference: TQ266842
  - Charing Cross: 3.25 mi (5.2 km) SSE
- London borough: Camden
- Ceremonial county: Greater London
- Region: London
- Country: England
- Sovereign state: United Kingdom
- Post town: LONDON
- Postcode district: NW3, NW6, NW8
- Dialling code: 020
- Police: Metropolitan
- Fire: London
- Ambulance: London
- UK Parliament: Hampstead and Highgate
- London Assembly: Barnet and Camden

Swiss Cottage is an area in the London Borough of Camden, England. It is centred on the junction of Avenue Road and Finchley Road and includes Swiss Cottage tube station. Swiss Cottage lies 3.25 miles (5.23 km) north-northwest of Charing Cross. The area was named after a public house in the centre of it, known as "Ye Olde Swiss Cottage".

== History ==
=== Toponymy ===
According to the Dictionary of London Place Names (2001), the district is named after an inn called The Swiss Tavern that was built in 1804 in the style of a Swiss chalet on the site of a former tollgate keeper's cottage, and later renamed Swiss Inn and in the early 20th century Swiss Cottage.

The inn, later known as Ye Olde Swiss Cottage pub, closed in February 2025.

=== Urban development ===
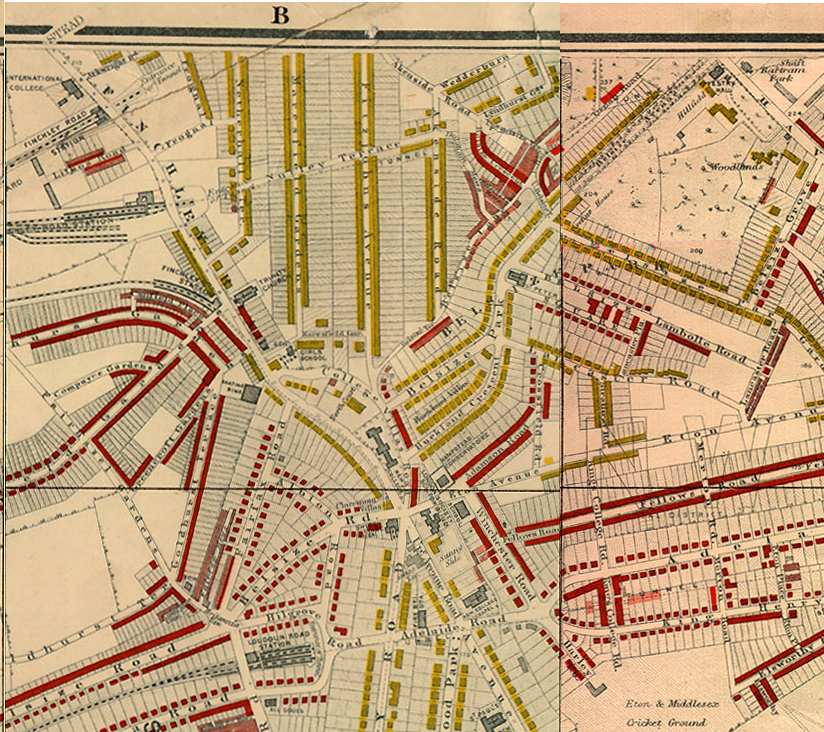
Finchley Road, Belsize Park, Frognal and Swiss Inn by Up^{r} Avenue Road in Hampstead in Charles Booth's colour coded property map. Red = Middle-class. Well-to-do. Gold = Upper-middle and Upper class. Wealthy. Gold covers the touching areas to the large traffic island in the 1890s except Belsize Road (red). The multi-road areas east and west were red.

The district formed part of the ancient parish of Hampstead. It developed following the Finchley Road Act 1826, which authorised construction of Finchley New Road and Avenue Road, with The Swiss Tavern built at the junction of the new roads. The neighbourhood around Finchley Road and Avenue Road was redeveloped in 1937 and 1938 with the opening of an Odeon cinema and the Regency Lodge flats. After World War II, local authority housing was constructed by the London County Council in the area. Council housing includes the five-tower Chalcots Estate built in the 1960s.

On 20 March 2014 a planning application was submitted for a 24-storey tower to be built next to Swiss Cottage tube station. The application was rejected by Camden Council on 11 September 2014 following mass local protests. A revised scheme received planning permission in 2016 but the developer, Essential Living, argued affordable housing requirements made the scheme uneconomic. After delaying construction for several years, it decided to start the originally approved building with construction expected to begin in 2023 and complete by 2025.

== Government ==
Swiss Cottage is in the Hampstead and Highgate constituency. It forms part of the Barnet and Camden London Assembly constituency. It is part of South Hampstead ward, electing councillors to Camden London Borough Council.

== Geography ==
Swiss Cottage is located 3.25 miles (5.23 km) north-northwest of Charing Cross. Adjoining neighbourhoods include Hampstead Village to the northeast, Chalk Farm and Camden Town to the southeast, Belsize Park to the east, St John's Wood to the south and West Hampstead to the west. Regent's Park is within walking distance of Swiss Cottage (about 1.4 km). Adelaide Road runs eastwards to Chalk Farm.

It is bounded by five conservation areas; Belsize, Elsworthy, Fitzjohns-Netherhall, South Hampstead, St. John's Wood (Camden) and St. John's Wood (Westminster).

Swiss Cottage includes part of the NW3, NW6 and NW8 postal areas.

== Demography ==
According to the 2011 census, Swiss Cottage had a population of 12,900. 67% of the Swiss Cottage ward population was white (40% British, 25% Other, 2% Irish). 7% was Other Asian and 5% Indian. 33% were Christians, 24% irreligious, 11% Jewish and 10% Muslim.

== Economy ==
Swiss Cottage/Finchley Road is identified as a district centre in the London Plan and there are assorted shops along the Finchley Road. Local major hotels include Marriott Regents Park, Danubius Regents Park, and Hampstead Britannia Hotel. There are many smaller hotels in the area. Notable restaurants provide European, South-East Asian, and Japanese cuisine.

== Transport ==
The area is served by two London Underground stations Swiss Cottage station (Jubilee line) and Finchley Road station (Jubilee line and Metropolitan line) and is a local hub for London Buses. The former Swiss Cottage station was opened by the Metropolitan Railway in 1868; the current station dates from 1939. London Overground stations South Hampstead station (Lioness line) and Finchley Road & Frognal station (Mildmay line) are also nearby. Swiss Cottage is also served by National coaches through the Finchley Road Coach Stop.

Local bus routes are:

- 13 – North Finchley to Victoria
- 31 – White City to Camden Town
- 46 – St Bartholomew's Hospital to Paddington
- 113 – Edgware to Marble Arch
- 187 – Finchley Road O2 Centre to Central Middlesex Hospital
- 268 – Golders Green to Finchley Road O2 Centre
- 603 – Muswell Hill to Swiss Cottage
- C11 – Brent Cross Shopping Centre to Archway
- N28 – Wandsworth to Camden Town
- N31 – Clapham Junction to Camden Town
- N113 – Edgware to Trafalgar Square

== Culture ==
Swiss Cottage is a cultural centre within Camden and north-west London. Local amenities include an Odeon IMAX Cinema, Sir Basil Spence's Grade II-listed Swiss Cottage Central Library, O2 Centre and the Hampstead Theatre. Swiss Cottage is the location of the Royal Central School of Speech and Drama, resident at the Embassy Theatre on Eton Avenue. Swiss Cottage Leisure Centre reopened in early 2006 after redevelopment; it now has two swimming pools, a gym and a climbing wall.

Many of the area's cityscapes and London street scenes, particularly of Swiss Cottage, Adamson Road, Eton Avenue and Belsize Park were represented by the Camden Town Group painter Robert Bevan and his wife, the Polish painter Stanisława de Karłowska. They lived at 14 Adamson Road and are commemorated with an English Heritage Blue Plaque.

== Notable residents ==
=== Commemorative blue plaques ===
- Robert Bevan (painter), 14 Adamson Road
- Clara Butt (singer), 7 Harley Road

=== Other notable residents ===
- Lillie Langtry (actress, socialite, and producer) lived in the area of Langtry Walk and was known to rendezvous nearby with Edward VII.
- Margery Mason (actress) best known for he portrayal of the Sweets Lady on the Hogwarts Express in the Harry Potter franchise
- Amy Winehouse (musician) lived near Eton Avenue
