= Frognal =

District in Hampstead, London

Coordinates: 51.553172°N 0.181249°W

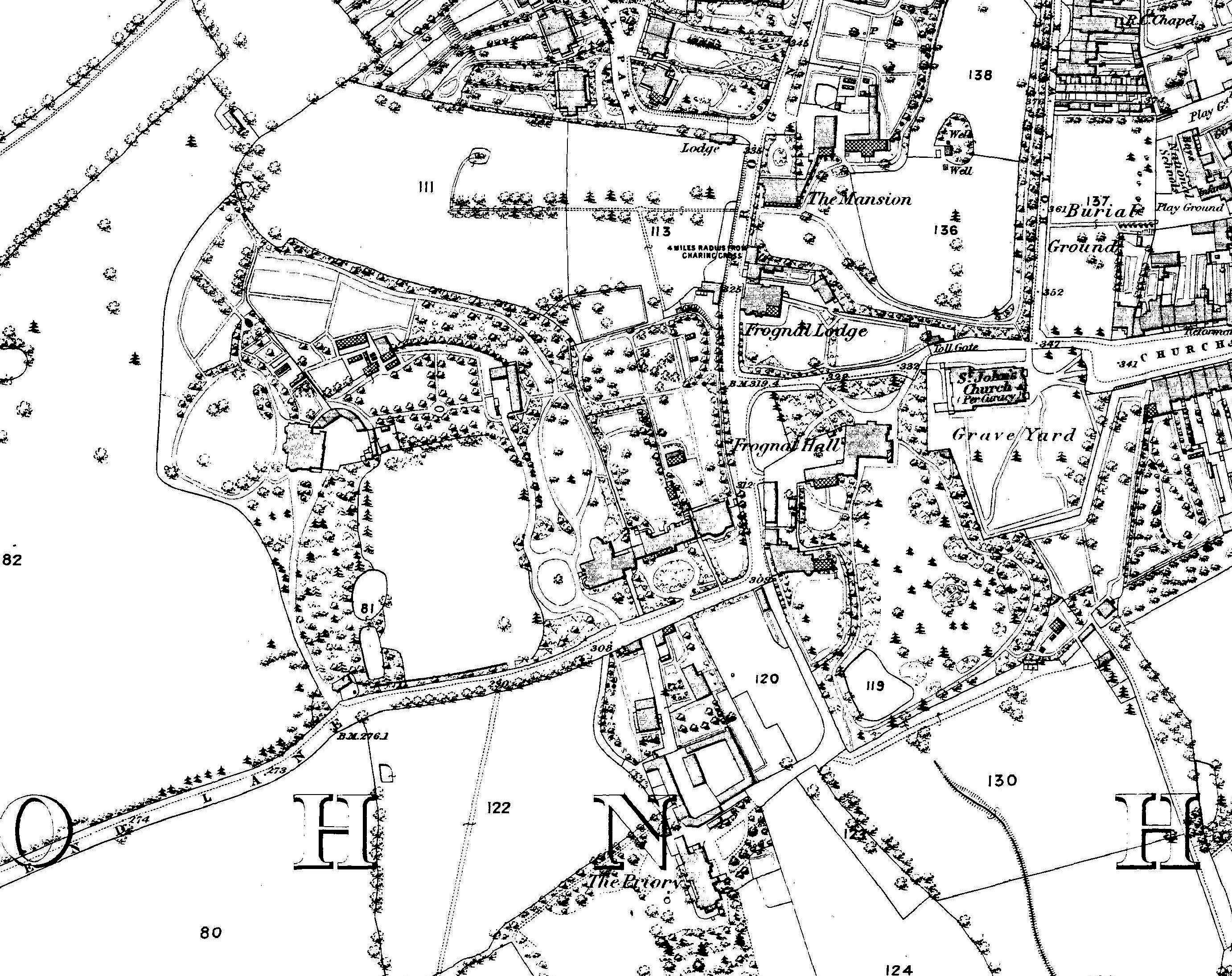
- Immediately west of St John's Church, Hampstead Village various houses included "Frognal" in the 19th century. It is today also the name of a street and part of the name of a station.

- Location within Greater London
- London borough: Camden
- Ceremonial county: Greater London
- Region: London
- Country: England
- Sovereign state: United Kingdom
- Post town: LONDON
- Postcode district: NW3
- Dialling code: 020
- Police: Metropolitan
- Fire: London
- Ambulance: London
- UK Parliament: Hampstead and Highgate
- London Assembly: Barnet and Camden

Frognal is a small area of Hampstead, North West London in the London Borough of Camden. Frognal is reinforced as the name of a minor road, which goes uphill from Finchley Road and at its upper end is in the west of Hampstead village.

== History ==
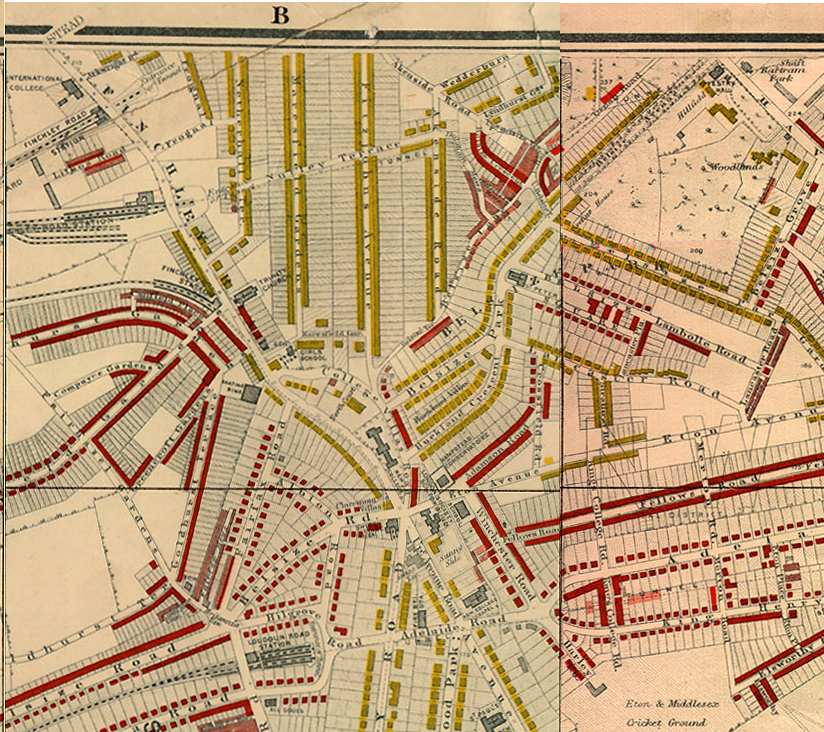
Finchley Road, Belsize Park, Frognal and Swiss Cottage in Hampstead in Charles Booth's colour coded property map. Red = Middle-class. Well-to-do. Gold = Upper-middle and Upper class. Wealthy. Gold covers Frognal itself in the 1890s.

The first reference to Frognal is as a tenement in the 15th century, probably on the site of the later Frognal House (now 99 Frognal). By the mid-eighteenth century it was a significant settlement, sought after by eminent lawyers, and infill development continued through the nineteenth and twentieth centuries.

The organist at St Andrew's Presbyterian Church was the father of composer John Tavener.

== Architecture ==
Frognal has a diverse architecture, with many architecturally notable buildings. The central area, lacking large council estates, has undergone less change than some other parts of Hampstead. University College School, an independent day school founded in 1830, relocated to Frognal (the road) in 1907. Frognal Grove, Grade II listed, (1871–72) was a large house inherited by the architect George Edmund Street, who made additions to it. It was later subdivided into four semi-detached houses.

== Notable residents ==
- Gerald Abraham, musicologist, lived at 106 Frognal from the 1940s onwards.
- Sir Walter Besant, the author, lived at 106 Frognal, and died at 18 Frognal Gardens in 1901.
- Webster Booth, the tenor and Anne Ziegler, the soprano, lived at Frognal Cottage, 102 Frognal, from 1949 to 1952.
- Dennis Brain (1921–1957), the horn player, lived at 37 Frognal.
- Kathleen Ferrier (1912–1953), the contralto, lived at 2 Frognal Mansions, 97 Frognal, from 1942.
- Charles Forte, /ˈfɔːrteɪ/ restaurant and hotel owner (Trust House Forte) lived at Greenaway Gardens in Frognal.
- The Labour Party leader Hugh Gaitskell lived at 16 Frognal Gardens and ran a salon of influence in the 1940s, and as Chancellor of the Exchequer in 1950.
- General Charles de Gaulle lived from 1942 to 1944 in 99 Frognal.
- Kate Greenaway (1846–1901), the illustrator, lived at 39 Frognal in a house designed for her by Richard Norman Shaw in 1885.
- Tamara Karsavina, the ballerina, lived at 108 Frognal in the 1950s.
- E. V. Knox (1881–1971), the editor of Punch, lived at 110 Frognal from 1945.
- The Labour Party leader Ramsay MacDonald (1836-1937) lived at Upper Frognal Lodge (103 Frognal) from 1925 until his death.
- William Page, historian and general editor of the Victoria County History, lived at Frognal Cottage (now 102 Frognal) from 1906 until 1922.
- Sir Bernard Spilsbury (1877–1947), the pathologist, died at 20 Frognal.
- Anton Walbrook, the actor, died at 69 Frognal in 1967.
- Alastair Sim, the actor, lived at 8 Frognal Gardens.

== Nearest places ==
- Hampstead village
- West Hampstead
- Swiss Cottage, Hampstead
- Belsize Park, Hampstead
- Fortune Green, West Hampstead

Overlapping (in many definitions):

- South Hampstead
- Finchley Road (a linear area)

=== Rail and London Underground stations ===
- Finchley Road & Frognal (London Overground Mildmay line)
- Hampstead (London Underground Northern line)
- Finchley Road (London Underground Jubilee and Metropolitan lines)

== See also ==
- One Oak, Frognal
- Shepherd's Well, Frognal Way
- Sun House, Frognal
- University College School
- Basil Feldman, Baron Feldman of Frognal
- Susan Garden, Baroness Garden of Frognal
