= Fortune Green (ward) =

Electoral ward in the London borough of Camden

- Electoral ward for the Camden London Borough Council
- Fortune Green ward boundaries since 2022
- Borough: Camden
- County: Greater London
- Population: 11,410 (2021) (Note: 2021 Census data reported for 2022 ward boundaries)
- Electorate: 8,590 (2022)
- Major settlements: Fortune Green
- Area: 1.006 square kilometres (0.388 sq mi)

Current electoral ward
- Created: 1978
- Number of members: 1978–2002: 2; 2002–present: 3
- Councillors: Nancy Jirira; William Coles; Farrell Monk
- ONS code: 00AGGH (2002–2022)
- GSS code: E05000132 (2002–2022); E05013655 (2022–present)

Fortune Green is an electoral ward in the London Borough of Camden, in the United Kingdom. The ward has existed since 1978 and was first used for the 1978 elections. It returns councillors to Camden London Borough Council. The ward covers the Fortune Green area in the west of Camden. The ward boundaries were revised in 2002 and 2022. The revision in 2002 increased the number of councillors returned from two to three.

== Camden council elections since 2022 ==
There was a revision of ward boundaries in Camden in 2022. The ward expanded slightly, gaining a very small area from West Hampstead.

=== 2026 election ===
The election took place on 7 May 2026.

2026 Camden London Borough Council election: Fortune Green (3)
Party	Candidate	Votes	%	±%
Liberal Democrats	Nancy Jirira	1,376		
Liberal Democrats	William Coles	1,199		
Liberal Democrats	Farrell Monk	1,151		
Green	Erin Carlson	847		
Labour	Katie Clark	746		
Labour	Kasia Kramer	646		
Green	Bruno Leipold	632		
Labour	Matthew Houlsby	623		
Green	Corne Verster	564		
Conservative	Ian Cohen	481		
Conservative	David Brierley	405		
Conservative	Dominic Parker	328		
Reform	Wendy Taylor	266		
Reform	Zachary Ilunga	248		
Turnout			37.48	+0.28
Liberal Democrats hold		Swing		
Liberal Democrats gain from Labour Co-op		Swing		
Liberal Democrats gain from Labour Co-op		Swing		

=== 2022 election ===
The election took place on 5 May 2022.

2022 Camden London Borough Council election: Fortune Green (3)
Party	Candidate	Votes	%	±%
Liberal Democrats	Nancy Jirira	1,481	16.19	
Labour Co-op	Lorna Greenwood	1,479	16.17	
Labour Co-op	Richard Olszewski	1,397	15.27	
Labour Co-op	Marcus Storm	1,288	14.08	
Liberal Democrats	Tracey Shackle	1,238	13.54	
Liberal Democrats	William Coles	1,151	12.58	
Conservative	Keith Sedgwick	376	4.11	
Conservative	Hannah David	374	4.09	
Conservative	Jamie Webb	362	3.96	
Turnout		9,146	37.2	
Liberal Democrats win (new boundaries)				
Labour win (new boundaries)				
Labour win (new boundaries)				

== 2002–2022 Camden council elections ==
Fortune Green ward boundaries from 2002 to 2022

There was a revision of ward boundaries in Camden in 2002.

=== 2021 by-election ===
The by-election took place on 22 July 2021, following the resignation of Flick Rea.

2021 Fortune Green by-election
Party	Candidate	Votes	%	±%
Liberal Democrats	Nancy Jirira	1,197	46.7	
Labour	Lorna Greenwood	849	33.1	
Conservative	Ian Cohen	518	20.2	
Majority		348	13.6	
Turnout		2,564	29.8	
Liberal Democrats hold		Swing		

=== 2018 election ===
The election took place on 3 May 2018.

2018 Camden London Borough Council election: Fortune Green (3)
Party	Candidate	Votes	%	±%
Liberal Democrats	Flick Rea	1,496	41.1	+6.1
Labour Co-op	Lorna Russell	1,468	40.3	+9.0
Labour Co-op	Richard Olszewski	1,353	37.2	+7.8
Labour Co-op	Sorin Floti	1,326	36.4	+8.9
Liberal Democrats	Adrian Bridge	1,209	33.2	+4.3
Liberal Democrats	Tracey Shackle	1,138	31.3	+5.0
Conservative	Phil Taylor	758	20.8	−6.4
Conservative	Shamim Ahmed	663	18.2	−4.3
Conservative	Axel Kaae	659	18.1	−2.8
Green	Helen Jack	378	10.4	−1.9
Turnout			41.55	
Liberal Democrats hold		Swing		
Labour Co-op hold		Swing		
Labour Co-op hold		Swing		

=== 2014 election ===
The election took place on 22 May 2014.

2014 Camden London Borough Council election: Fortune Green (3)
Party	Candidate	Votes	%	±%
Liberal Democrats	Flick Rea	1,151	35.0	−5.6
Labour	Lorna Russell	1,028	31.3	+8.2
Labour	Richard Olszewski	967	29.4	+6.6
Liberal Democrats	Nancy Jirira	950	28.9	−5.3
Labour	Phil Turner	904	27.5	+5.0
Conservative	Ian Cohen	893	27.2	+1.5
Liberal Democrats	Nick Russell	865	26.3	−10.0
Conservative	Andrew Parkinson	739	22.5	−3.1
Conservative	Tom Smith	686	20.9	−4.5
Green	Leila Mars	403	12.3	+0.9
Green	Juan Jimenez	326	9.9	−0.4
Green	Lucy Oldfield	318	9.7	+4.2
Turnout		9246	39.2	
Liberal Democrats hold		Swing		
Labour gain from Liberal Democrats		Swing		
Labour gain from Liberal Democrats		Swing		

=== 2010 election ===
The election on 6 May 2010 took place on the same day as the United Kingdom general election.

2010 Camden London Borough Council election: Fortune Green (3)
Party	Candidate	Votes	%	±%
Liberal Democrats	Flick Rea	2,123	40.6	−12.1
Liberal Democrats	Russell Eagling	1,898	36.3	−4.9
Liberal Democrats	Nancy Jirira	1,788	34.2	−9.0
Conservative	Harvard Hughes	1,342	25.7	+1.4
Conservative	Gio Spinella	1,335	25.6	+3.5
Conservative	Phil Woodward	1,326	25.4	+4.4
Labour	Phil Turner	1,207	23.1	+2.0
Labour	Enyd Norman	1,190	22.8	+2.9
Labour	Charlie Hedges	1,177	22.5	+7.9
Green	Paul Greenhalgh	595	11.4	−1.5
Green	Jane Ennis	536	10.3	−0.8
Green	Hugo Plowden	287	5.5	−5.1
Turnout		5,224	63.0	+28.4
Liberal Democrats hold		Swing		
Liberal Democrats hold		Swing		
Liberal Democrats hold		Swing		

=== 2006 election ===
The election took place on 4 May 2006.

2006 Camden London Borough Council election: Fortune Green (3)
Party	Candidate	Votes	%	±%
Liberal Democrats	Flick Rea	1,446	52.7	−8.1
Liberal Democrats	Jane Schopflin	1,187	43.2	−9.4
Liberal Democrats	Russell Eagling	1,132	41.2	−10.9
Conservative	Heather Downham	667	24.3	+8.5
Conservative	Jean Hornbuckle	608	22.1	+7.4
Labour	Miles Seaman	580	21.1	−1.6
Conservative	Peter Denison-Pender	576	21.0	+5.8
Labour	Howard Dawber	545	19.9	+0.5
Labour	Mohamoud Nur	402	14.6	−4.6
Green	Billy Murray	354	12.9	+2.5
Green	Lucia Nella	305	11.1	+1.8
Green	Benjamin Smith	291	10.6	+4.4
Turnout		8,093	34.6	
Liberal Democrats hold		Swing		
Liberal Democrats hold		Swing		
Liberal Democrats gain from Labour		Swing		

=== 2002 election ===
The election took place on 2 May 2002.

2002 Camden London Borough Council election: Fortune Green (3)
Party	Candidate	Votes	%	±%
Liberal Democrats	Flick Rea	1,295	60.8	
Liberal Democrats	Jane Schopflin	1,121	52.6	
Liberal Democrats	Jonathan Simpson	1,111	52.1	
Labour	Mike Katz	483	22.7	
Labour	Geoffrey Kingscote	414	19.4	
Labour	Miles Seaman	409	19.2	
Conservative	Richard Arthur	336	15.8	
Conservative	Esther Baroudy	323	15.2	
Conservative	Jean Hornbuckle	314	14.7	
Green	David Sunderland	221	10.4	
Green	Susan Craig	199	9.3	
Green	Stephen Dawe	132	6.2	
Turnout		6,358		
Liberal Democrats win (new boundaries)				
Liberal Democrats win (new boundaries)				
Liberal Democrats win (new boundaries)				

== 1978–2002 Camden Council elections ==
=== 1998 election ===
The election took place on 7 May 1998.

1998 Camden London Borough Council election: Fortune Green (2)
Party	Candidate	Votes	%	±%
Liberal Democrats	Felicity Rea	975		
Liberal Democrats	Jane Schopflin	829		
Labour	Michael Broughton	375		
Labour	Roy Lockett	372		
Conservative	Carrie Ruxton	228		
Conservative	Michael Prichett	226		
Turnout		3,005	39.3	
Liberal Democrats hold		Swing		
Liberal Democrats hold		Swing		
