= Childs Hill Park =

Public park in London, England

Coordinates: 51.5675°N 0.2009°W

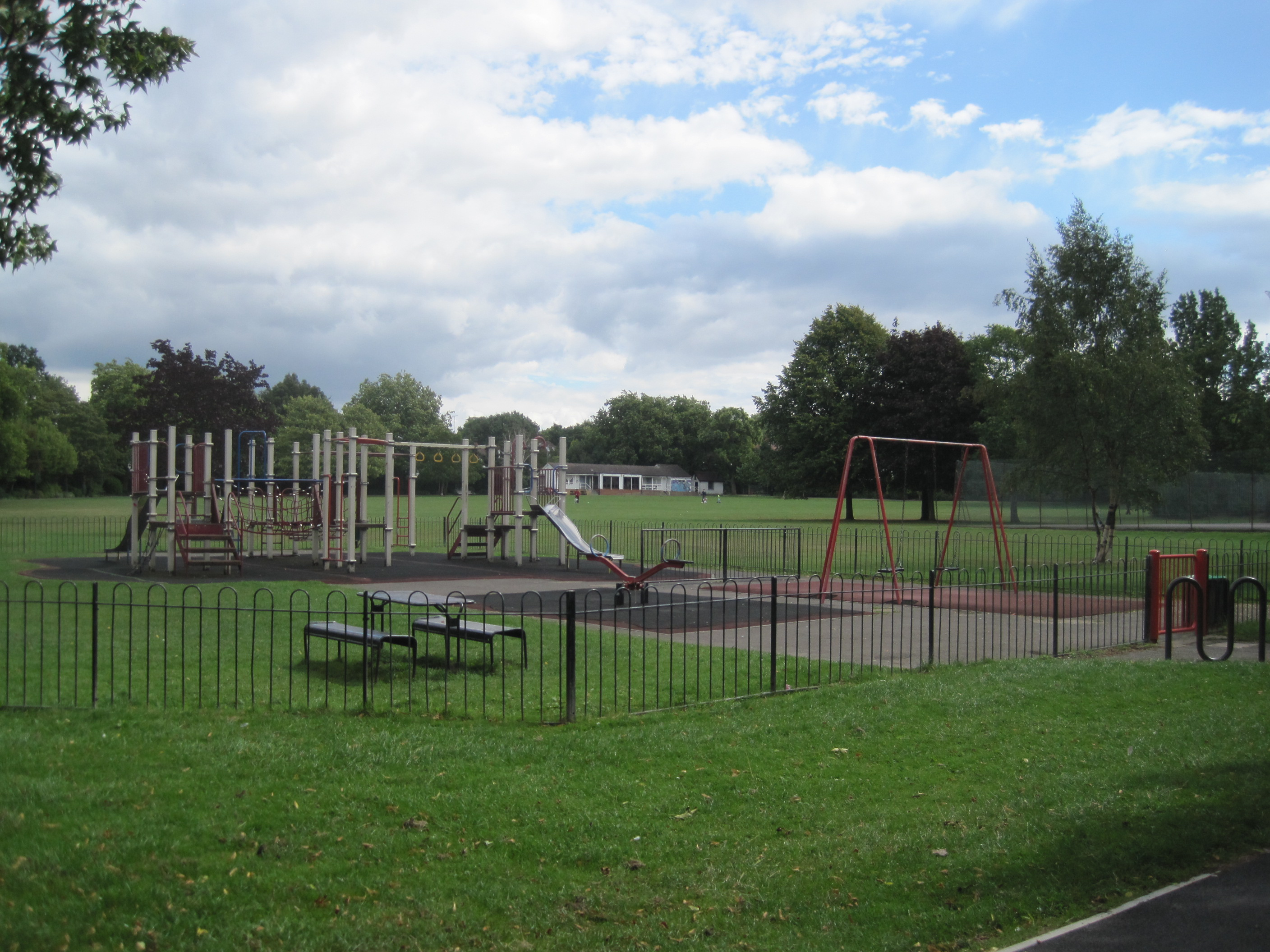

Childs Hill Park is a public park in Childs Hill in the London Borough of Barnet. Together with the neighbouring Basing Hill Park, it is one of Barnet's 'Premier Parks'.

It is a mainly grassed area with two tennis courts, a bowls club, a children's playground, a cafe and toilets. Clitterhouse Brook, a tributary of the River Brent, runs along the southern edge in a concrete pipe which is visible in places.

There is access from Nant Road, Hodford Road and Granville Road.

The old bowls club is now a fenced picnic area.

== History ==
Childs Hill was probably named after Richard le Child, a local landowner in the fourteenth century. In the late nineteenth century, there was rapid housing development, and in 1891 the land for Childs Hill Park was gifted by the Ecclesiastical Commissioners to the Hendon Local Board, which became Hendon Urban District Council in 1895. Hendon became part of the London Borough of Barnet in 1965.

== See also ==
- Parks and open spaces in the London Borough of Barnet
