= Richard Olszewski =

British Labour politician

Leader of Camden Council
- In office 2024–2026
- Preceded by: Georgia Gould
- Succeeded by: Sagal Abdi-Wali

Camden Borough Councillor
- In office 2014–2026
- Constituency: Fortune Green
- In office 1994–2002
- Constituency: Regent's Park

Personal details
- Born: Richard Janusz Olszewski; August 1961 (age 65)
- Party: Labour

Richard Janusz Olszewski (born August 1961) is a British Labour Party politician who served as the Leader of Camden London Borough Council from 2024 to 2026, when he failed to be re-elected as a councillor.

== Life ==
Olszewski grew up in Cambusbarron, Scotland. He joined the Labour Party to vote for Denis Healey to beat Tony Benn to be Deputy Leader of the Labour Party in the 1981 deputy leadership election.

Olszewski was a train guard and trade union official, working for the National Union of Railwaymen.

He was a councillor in Regent's Park in the 1990s, but stepped down to focus on being a special adviser to John Reid.

He returned to Camden Council in 2014 by narrowly winning the Fortune Green seat from the Liberal Democrats. He became the Cabinet member responsible for Finance in 2017. Olszewski succeeded Georgia Gould as Leader of the Council in 2024, after Gould was elected to Parliament. There were several contenders for the role.

He narrowly failed to be selected to stand for Parliament himself for the seat of Dudley at the 2024 general election. He was also long-listed for the seat of Welwyn Hatfield.

Olszewski made the decision to change wards for the 2026 election from his marginal ward of Fortune Green to the safe Labour ward of Holborn and Covent Garden, where he was defeated by the Green Party candidates.
