= Sun House, Frognal =

Coordinates: 51.5546°N 0.1814°W

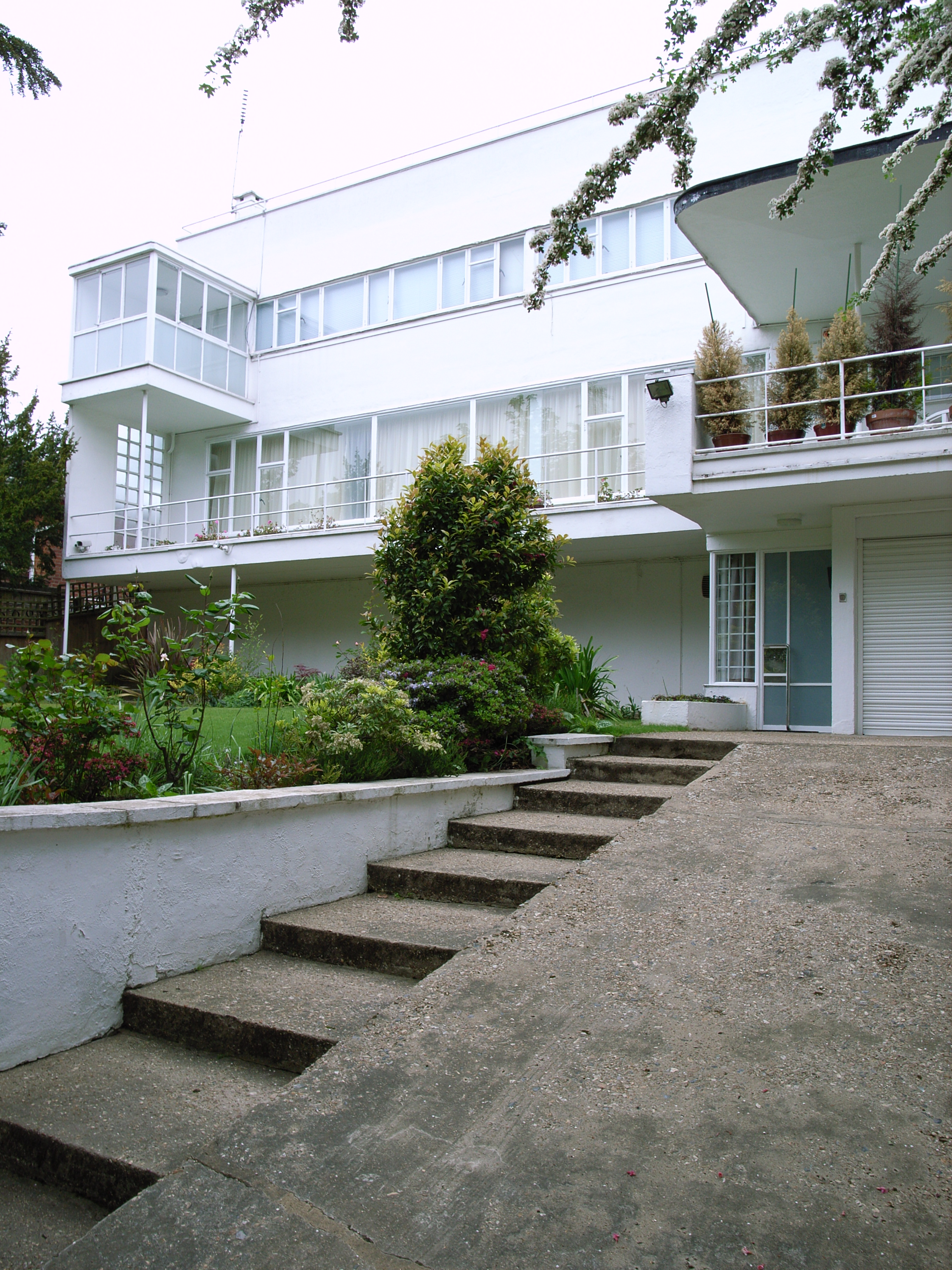
Sun House

The Sun House on Frognal Way, Frognal, Hampstead, London, UK, is a modernist house built in 1935–1936 by Maxwell Fry. It is a Grade II* listed building.
