= Swiss Cottage tube station =

London Underground station

Swiss Cottage
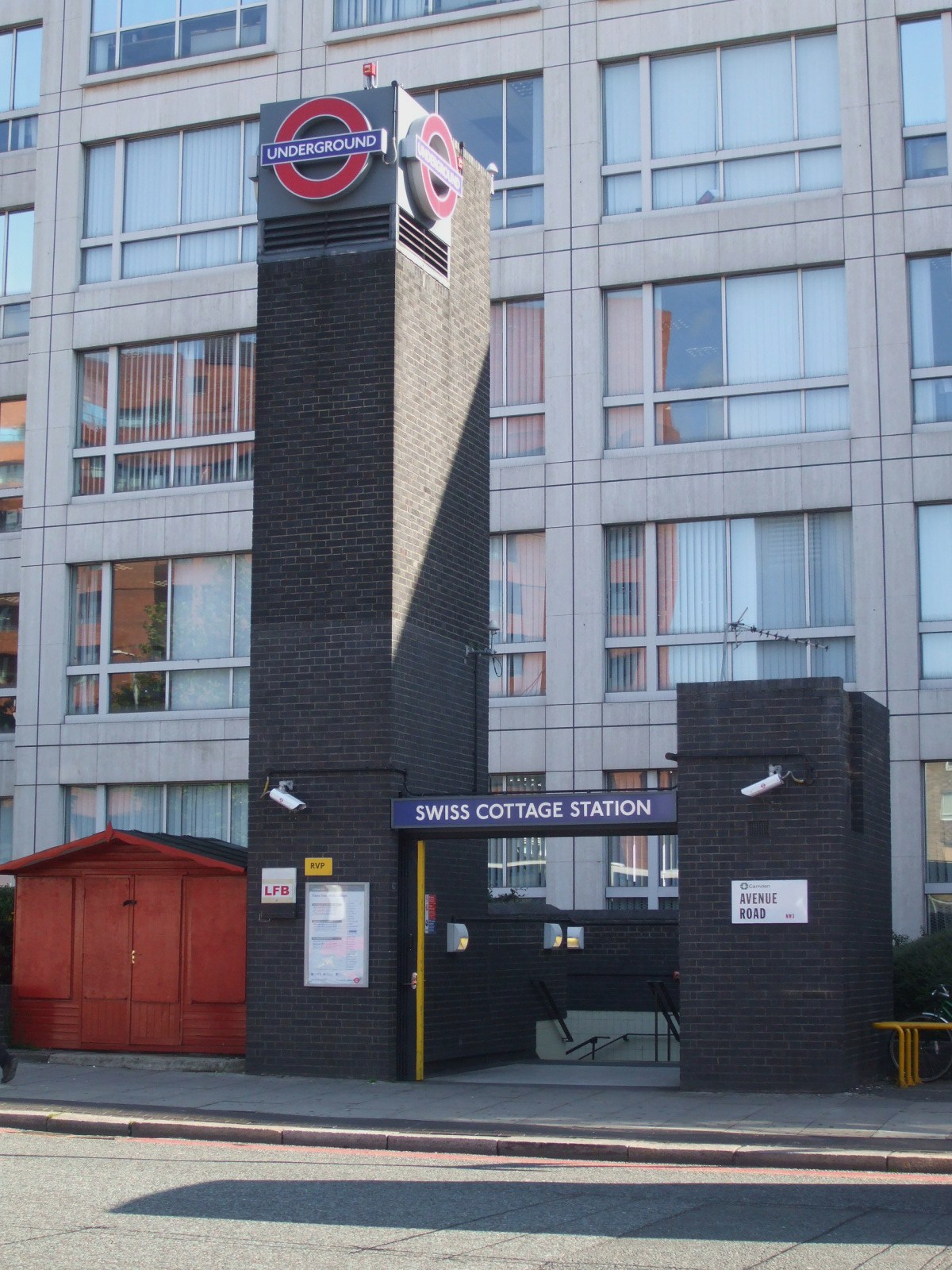
- Eastern entrance
- Interactive map of Swiss Cottage

General information
- Location: Swiss Cottage
- Local authority: London Borough of Camden
- Managed by: London Underground
- Number of platforms: 2
- Fare zone: 2

London Underground annual entry and exit
- 2020: ▼2.89 million
- 2021: ▲3.00 million
- 2022: ▲4.94 million
- 2023: ▲5.24 million
- 2024: ▲5.62 million

Railway companies
- Original company: London Passenger Transport Board

Key dates
- 20 November 1939: Station opened (Bakerloo line)
- 1 May 1979: Bakerloo service replaced by Jubilee line

Other information
- External links: TfL station info page
- Coordinates: 51.54306°N 0.17472°W

Swiss Cottage is a London Underground station at Swiss Cottage, London. It was opened in 1939 as a stop on the Bakerloo line. Today, the station is on the Jubilee line between Finchley Road and St John's Wood stations. It lies in London fare zone 2, and is located at the junction of Finchley Road, Avenue Road and College Crescent. The station is a local station, with the Metropolitan line bypassing the station nearby.

Swiss Cottage is situated 550 yards (500 m) from South Hampstead station on the London Overground's Lioness line, however this is not a recognised out-of-station interchange.

== History ==
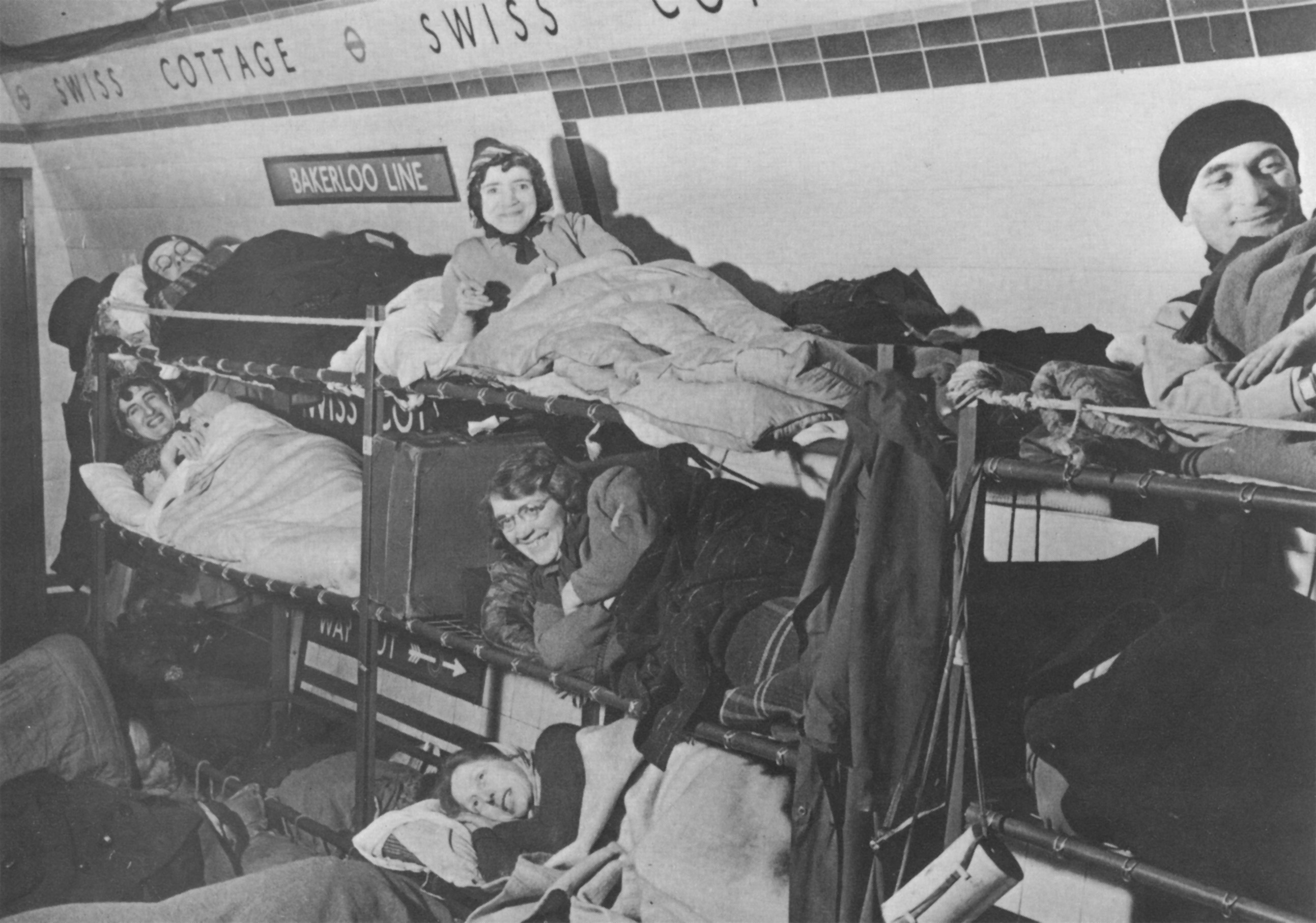
Residents sheltering in Swiss Cottage tube station during the Blitz

The station was opened on 20 November 1939, on a new section of deep-level tunnel constructed between Baker Street and Finchley Road stations when the Metropolitan line's services on its Stanmore branch were transferred to the Bakerloo line. It is named after a nearby pub built in 1803–4, originally called The Swiss Tavern and later renamed Swiss Cottage.

The new station initially operated as part of a combined station with the Metropolitan line's adjacent sub-surface Swiss Cottage station (platforms 1 and 2 were Metropolitan line and 3 and 4 were Bakerloo line), but the Metropolitan line station was closed on 17 August 1940. The Bakerloo line station was subsequently transferred (along with St John's Wood and the rest of the Stanmore branch) to the Jubilee line when it opened on 1 May 1979.

The station was used extensively during The Blitz of World War II as an air raid shelter.

== Connections ==
London Buses routes 13, 31, 46, 113, 187, 268, 603 and C11 and night routes N28, N31 and N113 serve the station.

Preceding station	London Underground	Following station
Finchley Road towards Stanmore	Jubilee line	St John's Wood towards Stratford
Former services
Finchley Road towards Stanmore	Bakerloo line Stanmore branch (1939–1979)	St John's Wood towards Elephant & Castle
