= Basing Hill Park =

Park

Coordinates: 51.5685°N 0.2060°W

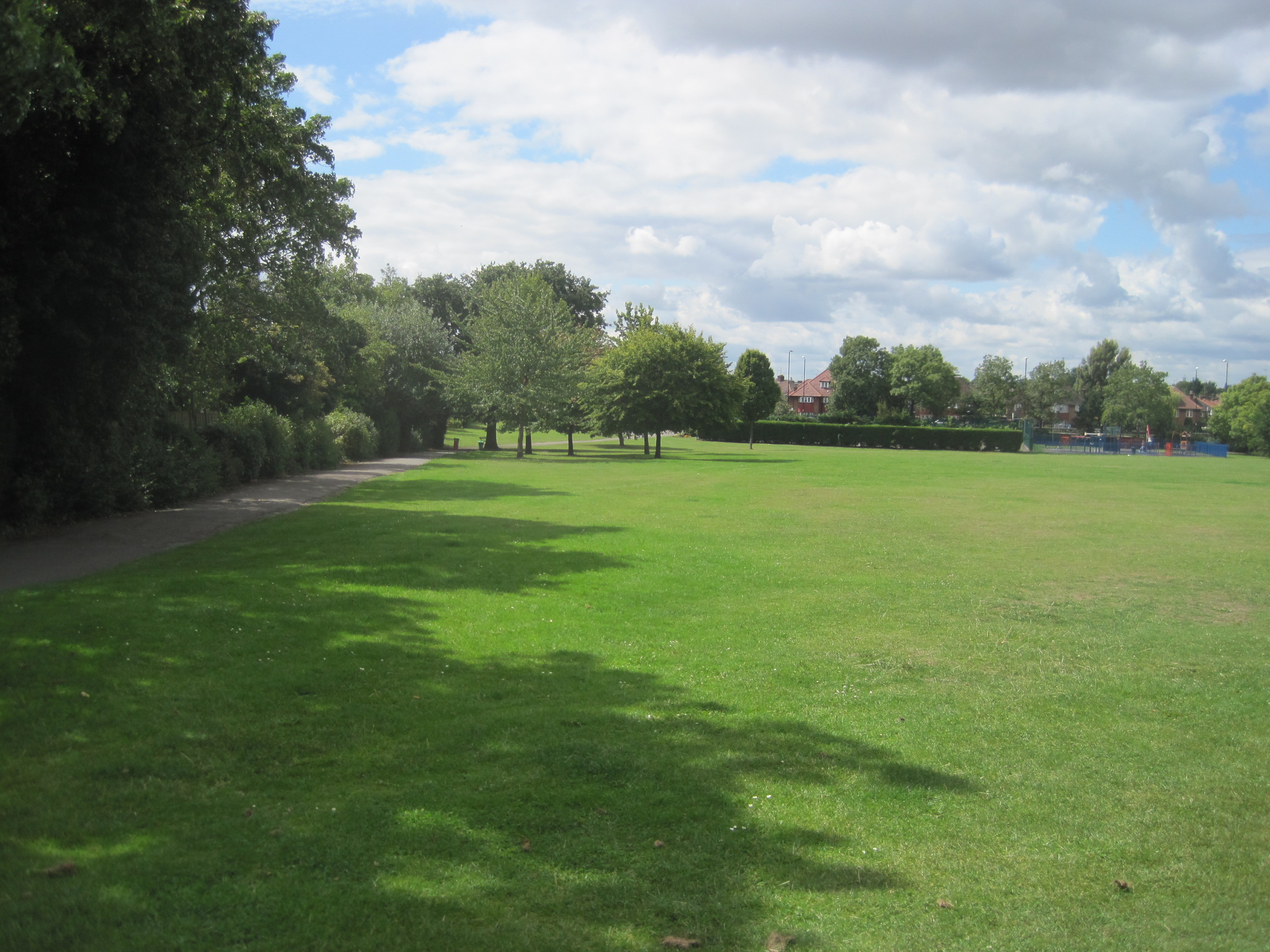

Basing Hill Park is a small public park in Childs Hill in the London Borough of Barnet. Together with the neighbouring Childs Hill Park it is one of Barnet's 'Premier Parks'. It is mainly grassed with scattered trees, a multipurpose tennis court/football pitch, basketball court, baseball pitch and a children's playground. There is also bicycle rider training in the park on Saturdays, April to November.

The area was open fields until the 1920s, when it was developed for housing, and in 1936 the ground was laid out as a park to serve the local people.

There is access from Wayside and Hendon Way.

Basing Hill Park is also home to Herts Baseball Club.

== See also ==
- Parks and open spaces in the London Borough of Barnet
