= West End Lane =

Street in London, England

Coordinates: 51.54566°N 0.19137°W

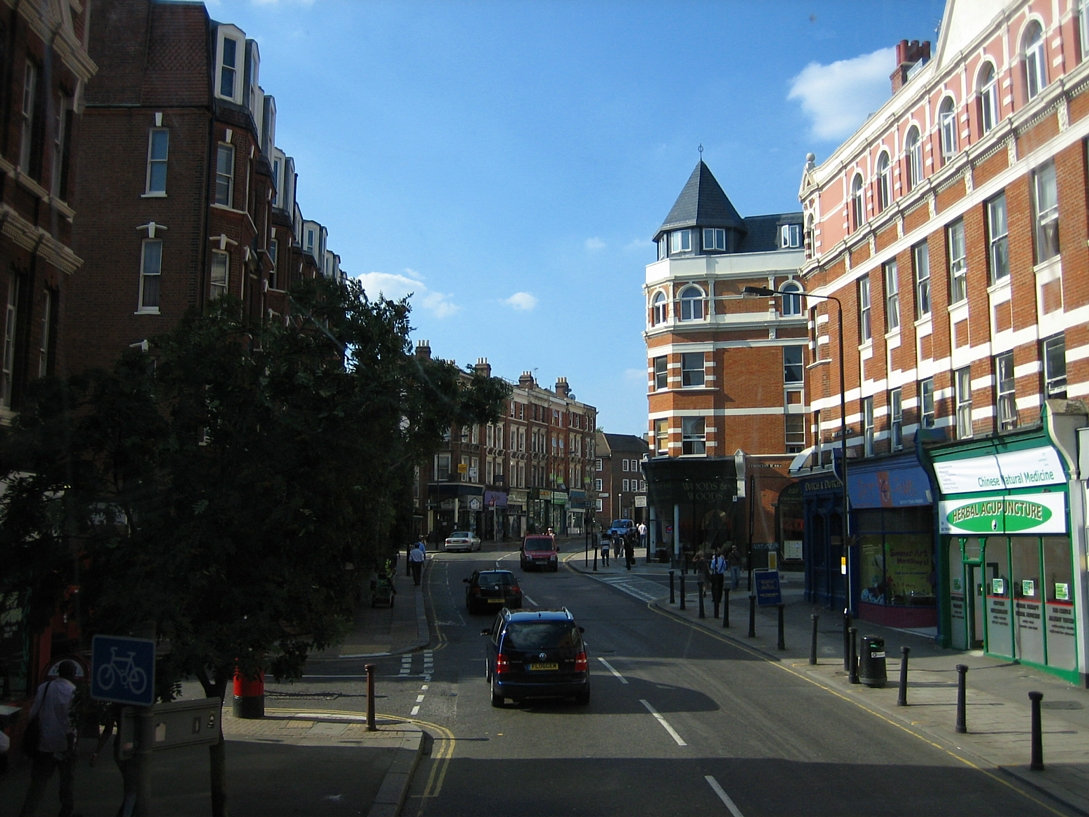
View of West End Lane.

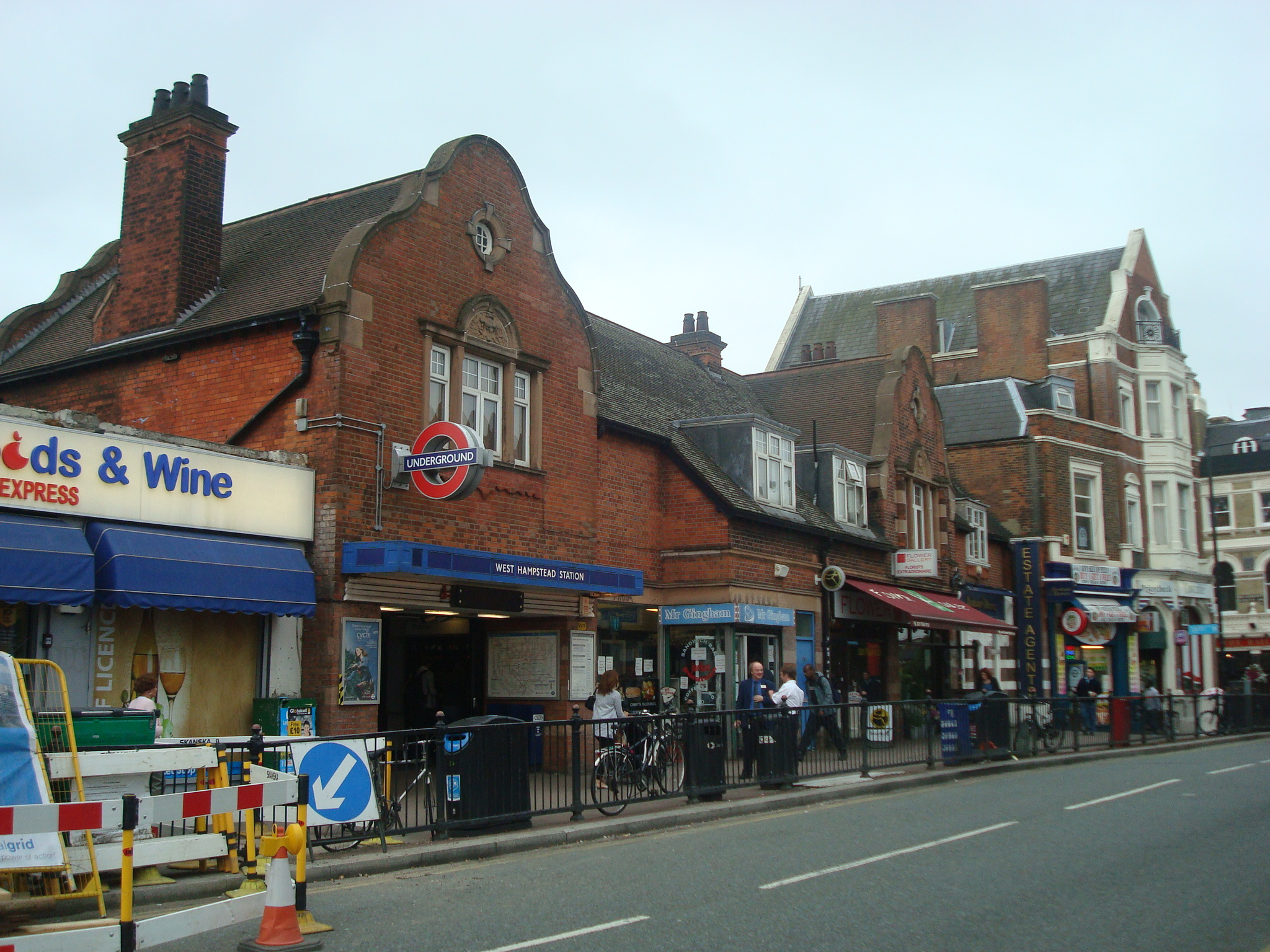
West Hampstead tube station.

West End Lane is a street in inner north-west London, England (grid reference TQ2585) that runs for about one mile between Kilburn High Road to the south and Finchley Road to the north. Located in the London Borough of Camden, and the NW6 postal district, the street winds through West Hampstead with a mix of residential and commercial buildings. The three West Hampstead stations are all located on the road at the centre of the district of that name. In the north-east (on the other side of Finchley Road) it today becomes Frognal Lane, although this stretch was once included as part of West End Lane. It also marks the western boundary of South Hampstead. It is not connected to the West End of Central London, which is around three miles to the south-east.

Most of the street is a bus route. A turning off West End Lane is Acol Road.

The lane takes its name from the Medieval West End hamlet, built on land belonging to Kilburn Priory, denoting the western extent of Hampstead. In the 19th century, the once rural area was gradually merged into the expanding London suburbs. The first station at West Hampstead was opened in 1871, with two other railway lines adding stations nearby before the end of the century as it become a popular location for commuters. Most of the buildings date from the late 19th century onwards, with a number of Edwardian redbrick mansion blocks and interwar art deco apartment buildings. West End Green is located near the northern end of the street, north of West Hampstead, just as it turns towards Frognal.

The North London Railway's West Hampstead stop was known as West End Lane station until 1975.

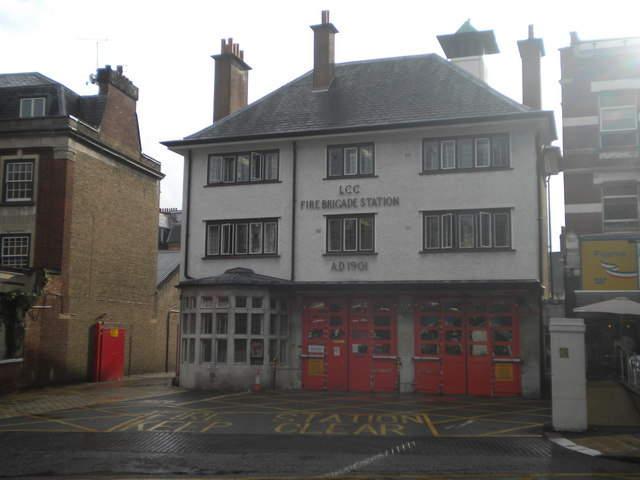
The fire station in West End Lane.

== See also ==
- North End Way, equivalent road marking the northern border of Hampstead

== Bibliography ==
- Bebbington, Gillian. London Street Names. Batsford, 1972.
- Cockburn, J. S., King, H. P. F. & McDonnell, K. G. T. & A History of the County of Middlesex. Institute of Historical Research, 1989.
- Cherry, Bridget & Pevsner, Nikolaus. London 3: North West. Yale University Press, 2002.
