= Finchley Road tube station =

London Underground station

Finchley Road
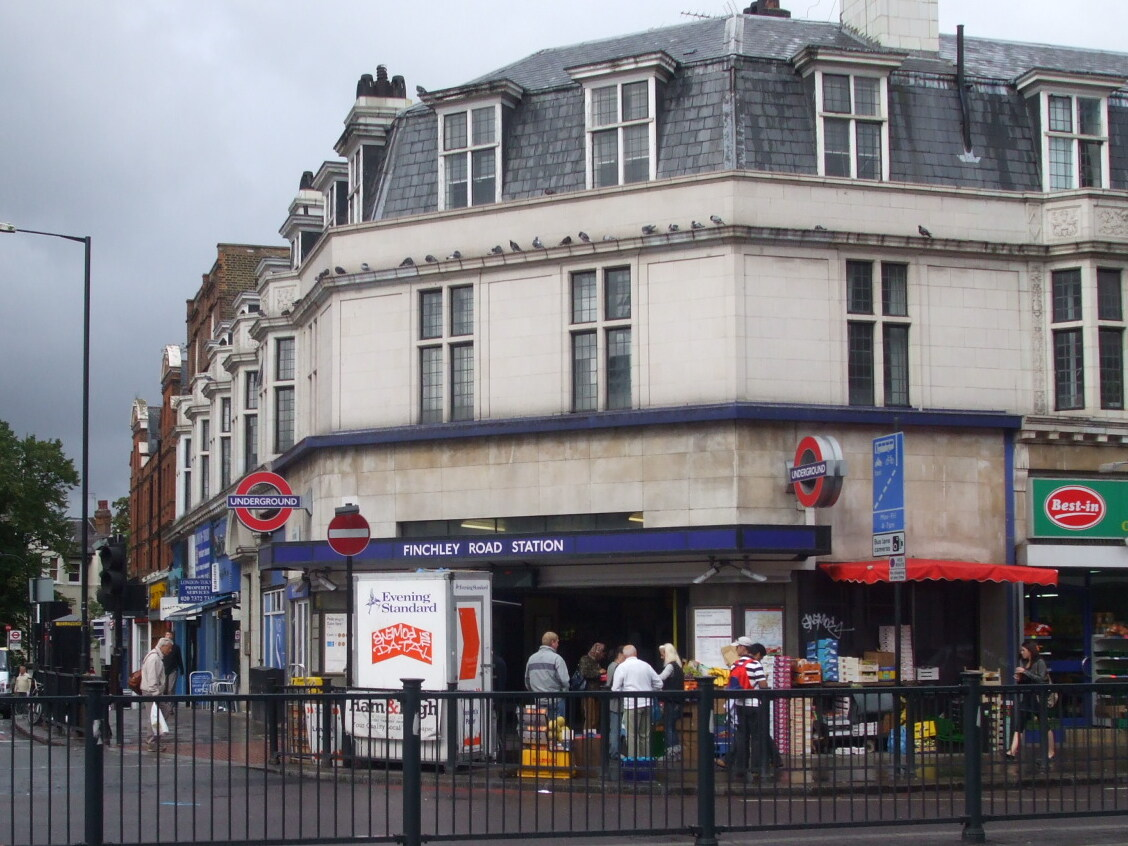
- Station entrance
- Interactive map of Finchley Road

General information
- Location: Finchley Road
- Local authority: London Borough of Camden
- Managed by: London Underground
- Number of platforms: 4
- Fare zone: 2
- OSI: Finchley Road & Frognal

London Underground annual entry and exit
- 2020: ▼4.70 million
- 2021: ▼3.91 million
- 2022: ▲6.68 million
- 2023: ▲7.05 million
- 2024: ▲7.60 million

Key dates
- 30 June 1879: Opened (MR)
- 20 November 1939: Start (Bakerloo line)
- 1 August 1941: Goods yard closed
- 1 May 1979: End (Bakerloo line)
- 1 May 1979: Start (Jubilee line)

Other information
- External links: TfL station info page
- Coordinates: 51.5472°N 0.18027°W

Finchley Road is a London Underground station at the corner of Finchley Road and Canfield Gardens in the London Borough of Camden, north-west London. It is served by the Jubilee and Metropolitan lines, and is in London fare zone 2. On the Jubilee line, the station is between West Hampstead and Swiss Cottage stations. On the Metropolitan line, it is between Wembley Park and Baker Street stations.

The station is situated 100 yards (91 m) south of the O2 Centre. It serves the Frognal and South Hampstead areas. It is also a five-minute walk from the Finchley Road & Frognal station on the London Overground's Mildmay line, and this is marked as an official out-of-station interchange. The station is in a cutting covered by a single glass and metal canopy and is the northernmost station below street level on the line.

== History ==
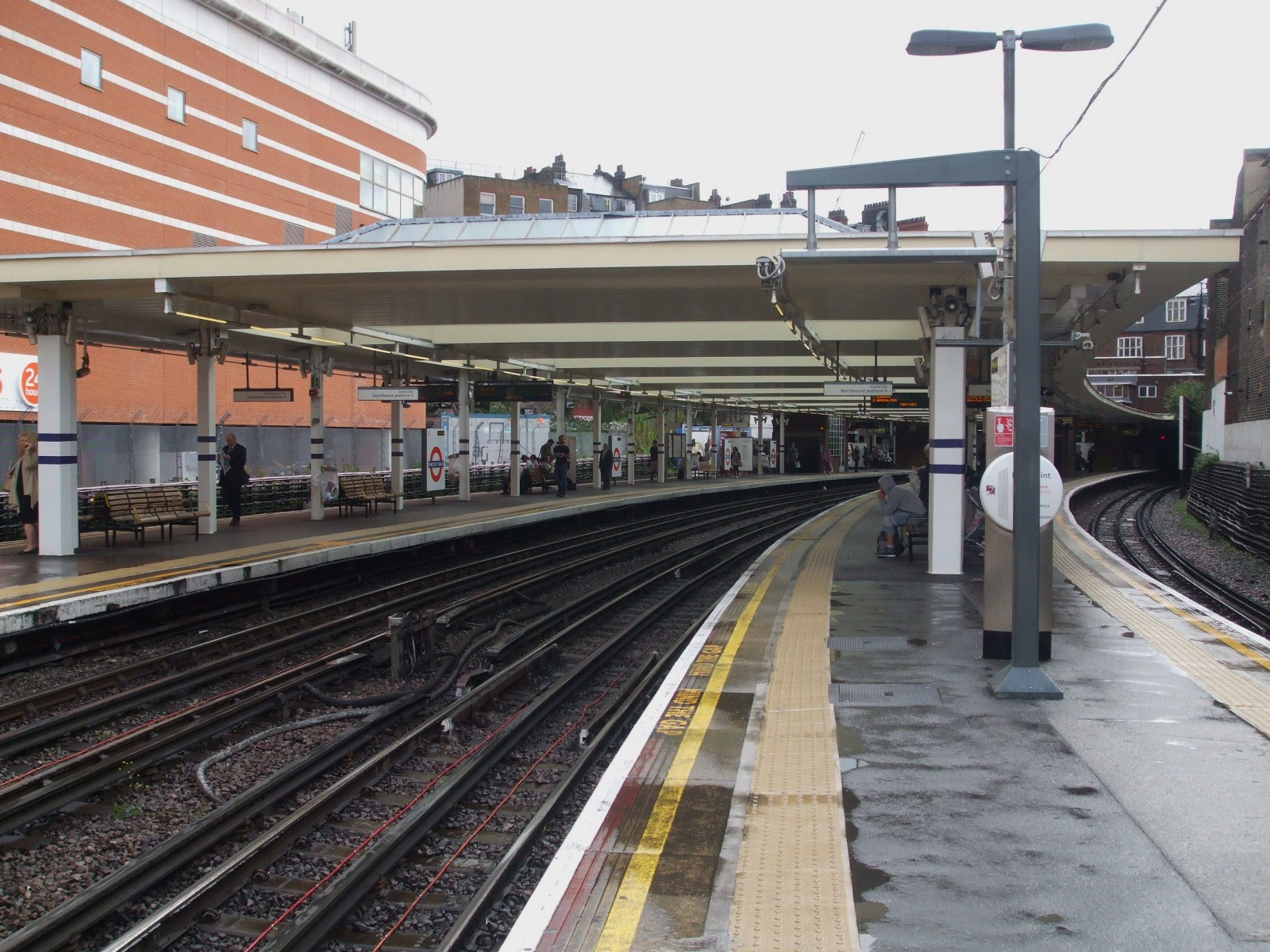
The station platforms looking south

The station was opened on 30 June 1879 by the Metropolitan Railway (MR, now the Metropolitan line) on its extension from its now closed station at Swiss Cottage (a different station from the current Swiss Cottage Jubilee line station). The station was rebuilt in 1914 with entrances incorporated into a new parade of shops.

By the mid-1930s, the Metropolitan line was suffering from congestion on its main routes from north-west London, caused by the limited capacity of its tracks between Finchley Road and Baker Street stations. To alleviate this congestion new sections of deep tube tunnels were bored between Finchley Road and Baker Street to carry some of the traffic from the Stanmore branch and stations south of Wembley Park. These new tunnels opened on 20 November 1939, and from that date Finchley Road station was also served by Bakerloo line trains running from Baker Street using the new tunnels. The Bakerloo line services were subsequently transferred to the Jubilee line when that line commenced operation on 1 May 1979.

There is a proposal to add a new entrance to the station from the site of the O2 Centre, as a part of the proposal to redevelop the site for housing.

== Services and layout ==
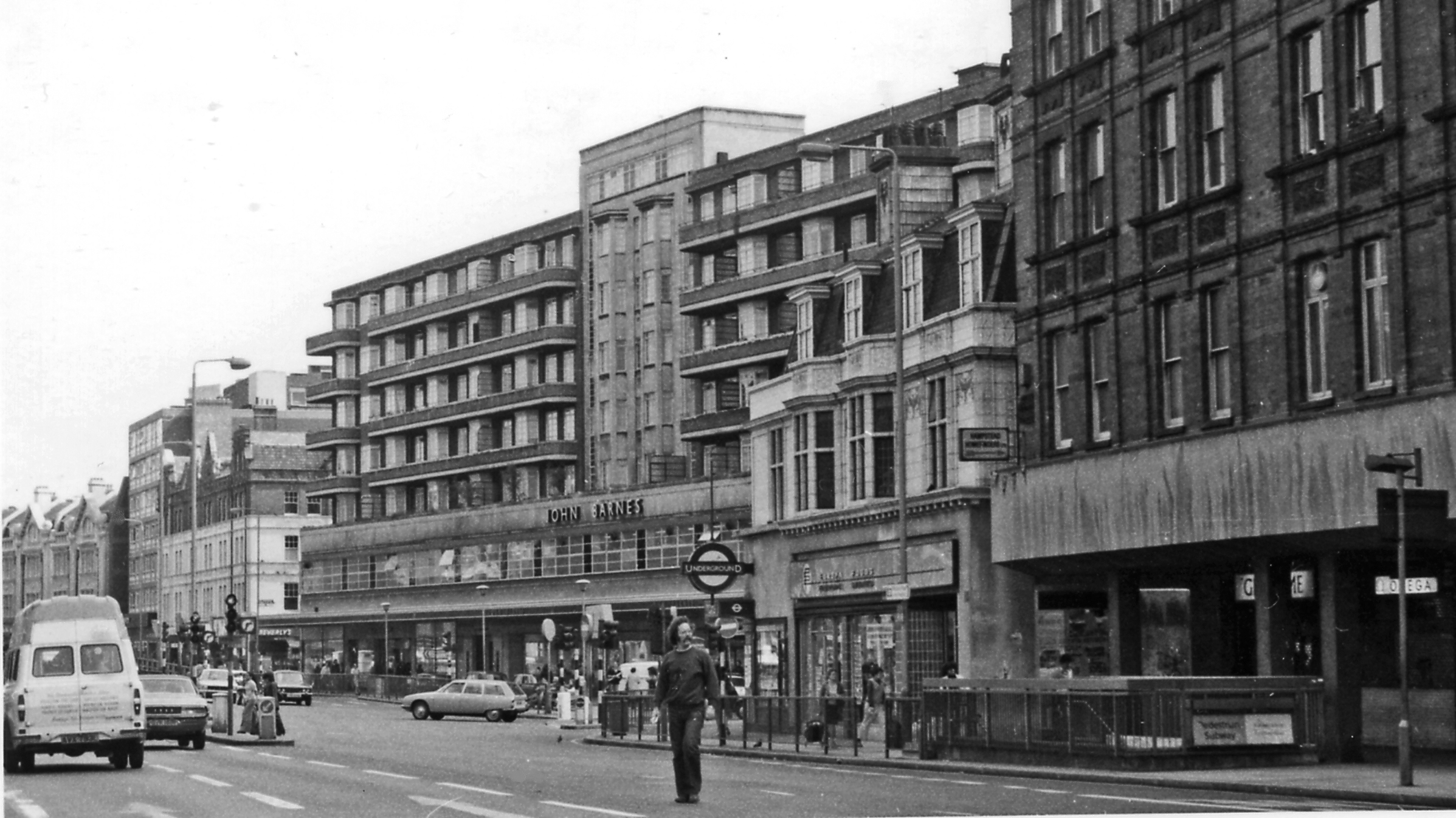
Station entrance in 1978

Finchley Road station is on the Jubilee and Metropolitan lines in London fare zone 2. On the Jubilee line, the station is between West Hampstead and Swiss Cottage. On the Metropolitan line, it is between Wembley Park and Baker Street.

The Jubilee line uses the inside tracks (platforms 2 & 3) and operates a service frequency of about 16 trains per hour between Stanmore and Stratford. The Metropolitan line uses the outside tracks (platforms 1 & 4) and offers services to the north-west of London and certain stations in the home counties.

== Connections ==
London Buses routes 13, 113, 187, 268 and C11 and night routes N113 serve the station.

Preceding station	London Underground	Following station
West Hampstead towards Stanmore	Jubilee line	Swiss Cottage towards Stratford
Wembley Park All stations towards Uxbridge, Amersham, Chesham or Watford	Metropolitan line	Baker Street towards Baker Street or Aldgate
Harrow-on-the-Hill Fast/Semi-fast (peak hours only) towards Uxbridge, Amersham, Chesham or Watford	Metropolitan line	Baker Street towards Baker Street or Aldgate
Former services
Preceding station	London Underground	Following station
West Hampstead towards Stanmore	Bakerloo line Stanmore branch (1939–1979)	Swiss Cottage towards Elephant & Castle
West Hampstead towards Stanmore	Metropolitan line Stanmore branch (1932–1939)	Swiss Cottage towards Baker Street or Aldgate
