= Hendon Way =

Road in London, England

Coordinates: 51.579°N 0.224°W

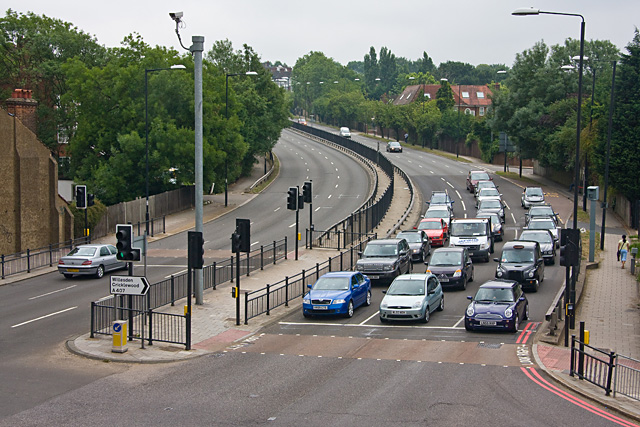
Hendon Way

Hendon Way is one of London's busiest roads. It connects Finchley Road to Watford Way. It passes through Hampstead and Hendon, and forms part of the A41 road. (London-Birkenhead). It is a road that passes Staples Corner and meets the Watford Bypass.
