= Fortune Green =

Area in London, England

Coordinates: 51.555556°N 0.194444°W

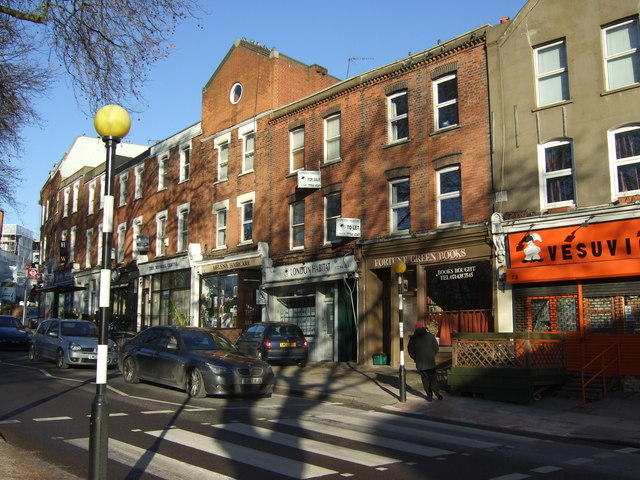

- Location within Greater London
- London borough: Camden
- Ceremonial county: Greater London
- Region: London
- Country: England
- Sovereign state: United Kingdom
- Post town: LONDON
- Postcode district: NW2, NW6
- Dialling code: 020
- Police: Metropolitan
- Fire: London
- Ambulance: London
- UK Parliament: Hampstead and Highgate
- London Assembly: Barnet and Camden

Fortune Green is a small area in West Hampstead, London Borough of Camden.

Lying on the south-west side of the Finchley Road, Hampstead town council decided to build its overflow cemetery there in the 1840s. A guide to Hampstead Cemetery, with short biographies of selected grave occupants and maps of their location and illustrations of the more prominent monuments, was published in 2000.

It now lies in the London Borough of Camden as a ward. The ward has existed since the May 1978 local elections and was redrawn in May 2002. The population of this ward at the 2011 Census was 11,740 and is associated closely with West Hampstead, evidenced in the joint Fortune Green & West Hampstead Neighbourhood Plan adopted by Camden Council in September 2015.

A literary reference: In Our Spoons Came from Woolworth's by Barbara Comyns, the narrator and her husband, Charles, move into an 'attic flat' in Fortune Green (Chapter 8).

== Nearby places ==
- Childs Hill (to the north)
- Frognal / Hampstead (to the east)
- West Hampstead (to the south)
- Kilburn (to the south-west)
- Mapesbury (to the west)
- Cricklewood (to the north-west)
