= Finchley Road & Frognal railway station =

London Overground station

Finchley Road & Frognal
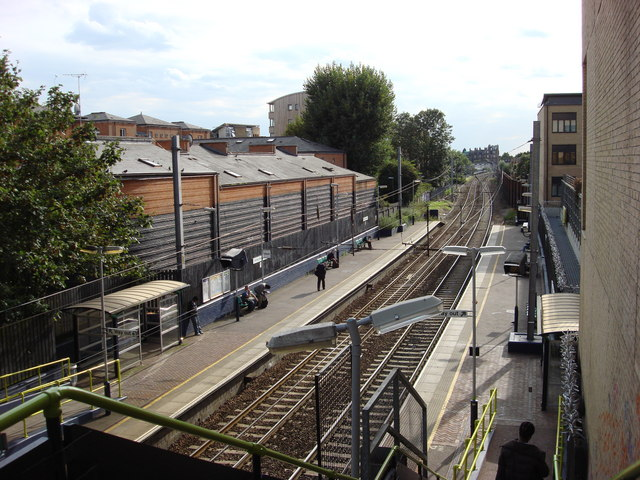
- The station in 2007
- Interactive map of Finchley Road & Frognal

General information
- Location: Frognal
- Local authority: London Borough of Camden
- Managed by: London Overground
- Owner: Network Rail
- Station code: FNY
- DfT category: E
- Number of platforms: 2
- Fare zone: 2
- OSI: Finchley Road

National Rail annual entry and exit
- 2020–21: ▼0.770 million
- 2021–22: ▲1.426 million
- 2022–23: ▲1.570 million
- 2023–24: ▲1.783 million
- 2024–25: ▲1.876 million

Key dates
- 1860: Opened

Other information
- External links: Departures; Facilities
- Coordinates: 51.5499°N 0.1837°W

Finchley Road & Frognal is a station on the Mildmay line of the London Overground, located on Finchley Road in the London Borough of Camden in north London. It is in London fare zone 2. The station is about five minutes walk from Finchley Road tube station on the Metropolitan line and Jubilee line of the London Underground, and is marked as an official out-of-station interchange. The station was opened as Finchley Road St Johns Wood in 1860 on the Hampstead Junction Railway for the connection to the North London Railway.

== Services ==
All services at Finchley Road & Frognal are operated by London Overground as part of the Mildmay line using Class 378 EMUs.

The typical off-peak service in trains per hour is:

- 8 tph to Stratford via Camden Road
- 4 tph to Richmond
- 4 tph to Clapham Junction

During the late evenings, the services to and from Clapham Junction do not operate.

Preceding station	London Overground	Following station
West Hampstead towards Clapham Junction or Richmond	Mildmay line North London line	Hampstead Heath towards Stratford

== Connections ==
London Buses routes 13 and 113 and night route N113 serve the station.
