= London Buses route 113 =

London bus route

113
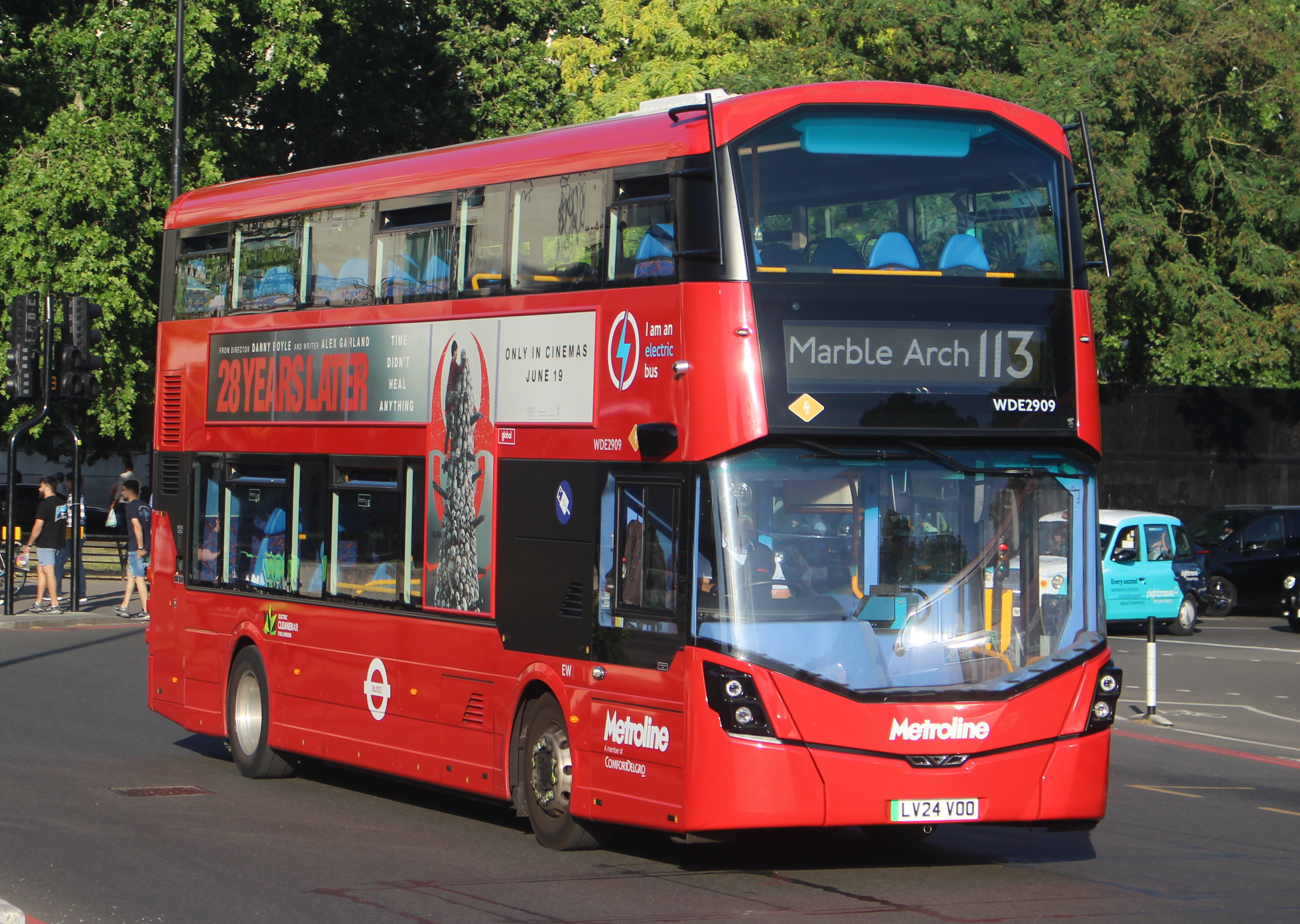
- Metroline Wright StreetDeck Electroliner at Marble Arch in June 2025

Overview
- Operator: Metroline
- Garage: Edgware
- Vehicle: Wright StreetDeck Electroliner
- Night-time: Night Bus N113

Route
- Start: Edgware bus station
- Via: Mill Hill; Hendon; Brent Cross; Swiss Cottage; Baker Street
- End: Marble Arch station

London Buses route 113 is a Transport for London contracted bus route in London, England. Running between Edgware bus station and Marble Arch station, it is operated by Metroline.

== History ==
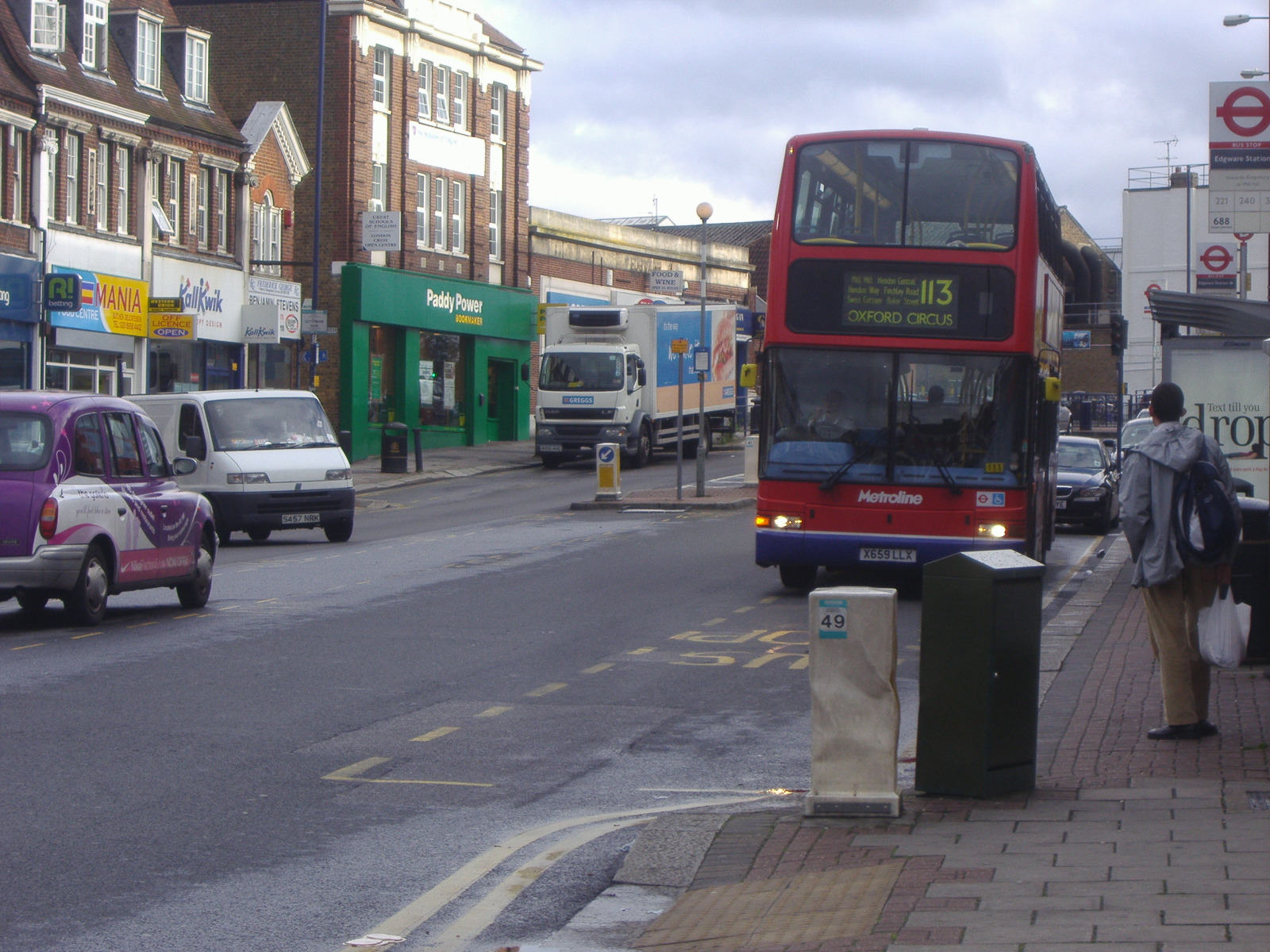
Metroline Plaxton President bodied Volvo B7TL at Edgware in August 2008

Route 113 is a particularly notable route as it ran over exactly the same routeing between Edgware and Oxford Circus for over 70 years, from before World War II until 6 November 2009.

After 70 years of operation between Edgware and Oxford Circus, the route was withdrawn between Oxford Circus and Orchard Street, and diverted to Marble Arch (returning from Portman Street) on 7 November 2009 as part of the Mayor of London's pledge to reduce the number of buses using Oxford Street, breaking some 2,100 daily passenger journeys on the route between Oxford Street, Hendon, Mill Hill and Edgware. The route was also planned for simultaneous conversion to 24-hour operation in 2009, along with improvements to evening and Sunday frequencies, and a possible diversion in Mill Hill via The Broadway, Hale Lane and Selvage Lane.

However, these improvement plans did not come to fruition at the same time as the curtailment to Marble Arch, and were postponed until the next contract commenced in March 2012. Transport for London published their proposals to create an N113 running along the normal daytime route from Edgware to Oxford Street, but additionally serving Oxford Circus, Piccadilly Circus and Trafalgar Square. The N113 was eventually introduced on 30 June 2012. Upon being re-tendered, the route was retained by Metroline with a new contract commencing on 31 March 2012. In 2015, TfL consulted on plans to restore the historic southern terminus of Oxford Circus. These plans were initially suspended but revived again in 2016. This took effect from 1 April 2017 when Metroline commenced a new contract.

On 28 August 2021, the route was once again diverted to Marble Arch due to the pedestrianisation of Oxford Circus.

== Current route ==
Route 113 operates via these primary locations:

- Edgware bus station for Edgware station
- Stoneyfields Park
- Mill Hill Circus
- Hendon War Memorial
- Hendon Central station
- Brent Cross
- Finchley Road & Frognal station
- Finchley Road station
- Swiss Cottage station
- St John's Wood station
- Lord's Cricket Ground
- London Central Mosque
- Baker Street station
- Marble Arch station
