= Adelaide Nature Reserve =

Nature reserve in London, England

Coordinates: 51.54382°N 0.161319°W

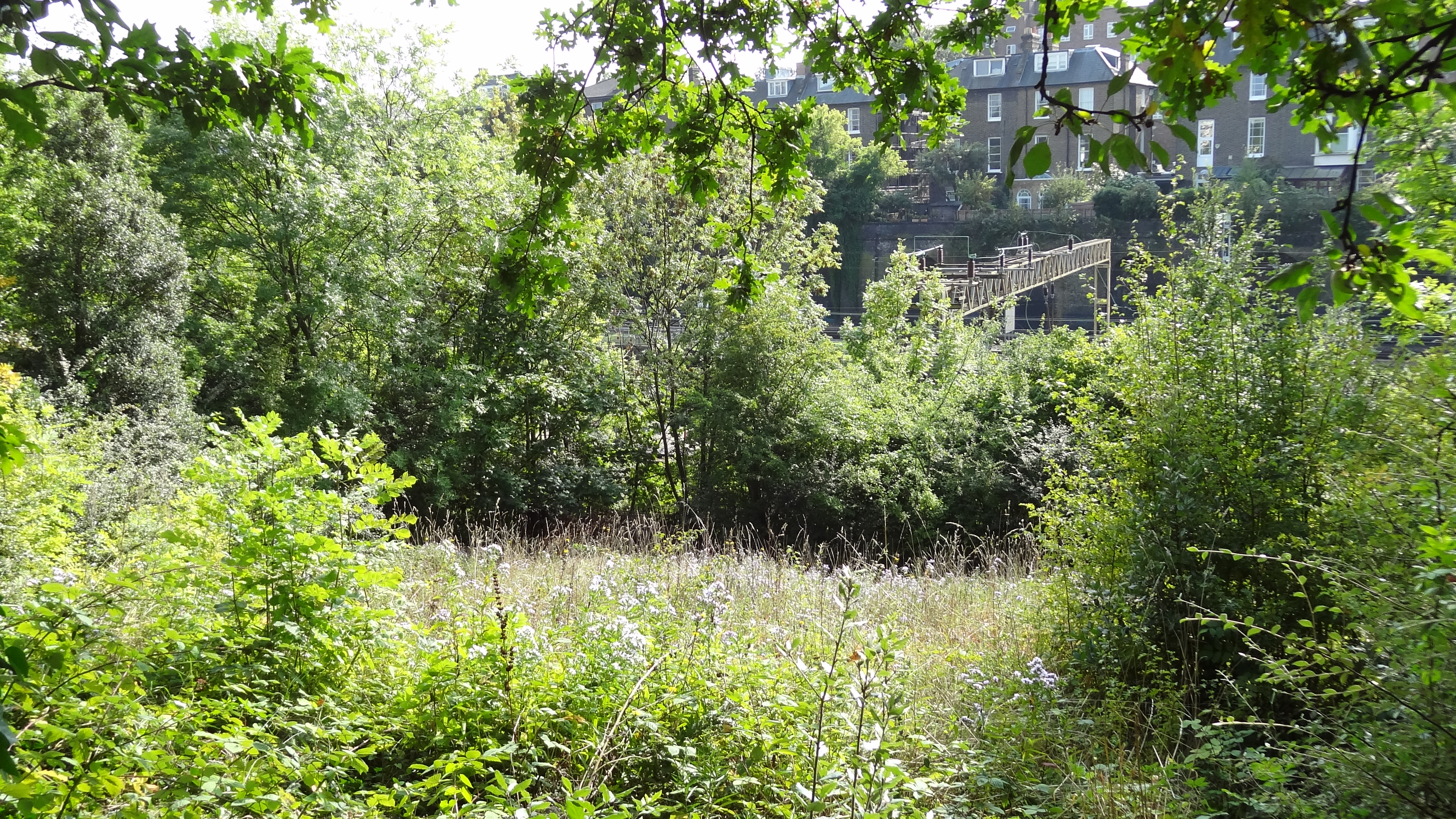
Adelaide Nature Reserve

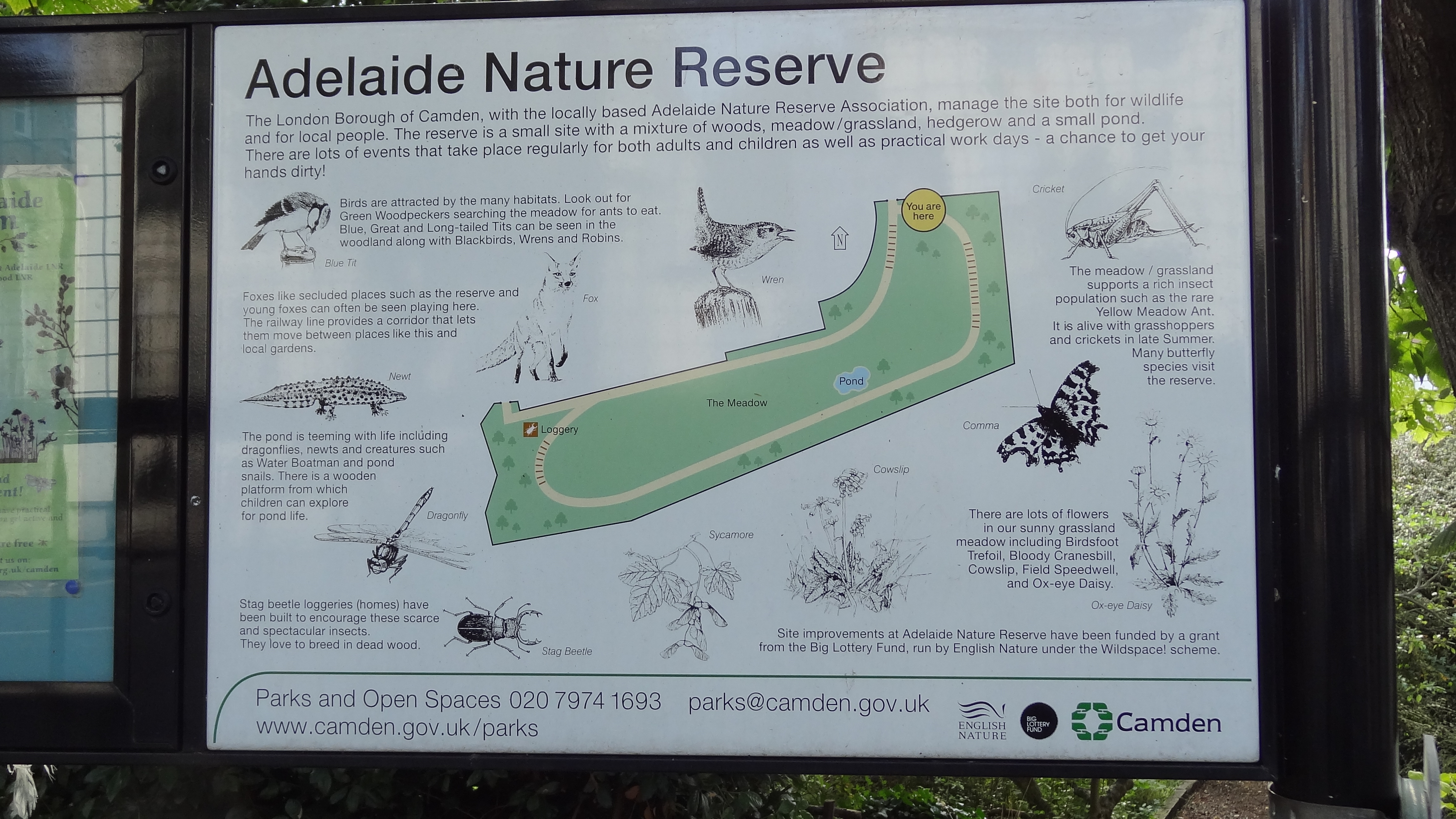
Noticeboard

Adelaide Local Nature Reserve is in north west London, in the area of Chalk Farm, Primrose Hill, Belsize Park and Swiss Cottage. It is managed by a local volunteer group, the Adelaide Nature Reserve Association, which works with the Camden Council to improve the site for wildlife and local community use and enjoyment. The site is a Local Nature Reserve and Site of Borough Importance for Nature Conservation, Grade 1.

== History ==
The site has been a nature reserve since 1984 but for hundreds of years had been a hay meadow area which provided food for London’s horses. A railway was built through the area in the 19th century and Stephenson’s railway tunnel, completed in 1837, can be seen nearby. In the 20th century, up until world war two, it was covered with domestic gardens. There was a tree nursery here at one time. The reserve was co-founded by Ursula Granville and there is a plaque to commemorate her. The land is owned by Network Rail, who lease it to the London Borough of Camden for use as a nature reserve. The site has been managed as a nature reserve since 1985 and received official Local Nature Reserve status in 2011. However, towards the close of 2011, the site has been threatened by an adjacent building project proposal.

== Habitats and access ==
The reserve is dominated by a south facing meadow with some adjacent areas of woodland. There are two ponds one of which has a dipping platform. A circular path runs around the site. A mural, which includes illustrations of site wildlife, overlooks the reserve. Due to the steep sloping nature of the site, there is no wheelchair access as of 2012. The entrance to the site is on Adelaide Road, east of Primrose Hill Road, and the reserve is open to the public on Saturdays and Sundays.

== Activities ==
There are events held on the last Sunday of the month from 11am – 3pm and at other times by arrangement. Activities have included bird and plant surveying, nature trails, wildlife arts and crafts, badge making, nature quizzes and games and much else. Volunteers from Green Gym, University College London, Interact and other groups have all worked here.

== Wildlife ==
=== Insects ===
An insect survey found a wide variety of unusual insects, including rare solitary wasps. The site has a notable variety of grasshoppers and crickets. The most notable find was a rare species of chafer beetle last seen in Britain in the 1950s in Cheshire. Lesser stag beetles are common and volunteers are encouraging the great stag beetle by building loggeries. Site volunteers leave logs in place to provide habitats for insects and fungi. A fine insect house has been built to provide winter homes for insects such as Ladybirds, Lacewings & Butterflies. There are also bee nesting boxes. Butterflies include peacock, comma, meadow brown, small heath, small skipper, Essex skipper, green-veined, large and small white, small copper, brimstone, holly blue, common blue, speckled wood and gatekeeper. Amongst moths narrow-bordered bee hawkmoth and burnet moth have been recorded. An unwelcome recent arrival has been the harlequin ladybird, which is a threat to native ladybird species. A spectacular new arrival in recent years has been the wasp spider. Yellow meadow ants make distinctive mounds in the meadow.

=== Birds ===
Birds are surveyed at regular intervals. Green woodpeckers have been seen hunting for ants in the meadow. Regular visitors have included great, blue and long-tailed tits, robin, wren, blackcap, carrion crow, jay, magpie and blackbird – all common urban birds. A more unusual visitor was a meadow pipit. Red kite and sparrowhawk have been seen overhead. A bird-feeding station has been installed and this is a good place to see the birds. There are many bird boxes in place throughout the reserve and blue tits have used them.

=== Animals ===
Foxes have dug their dens in the reserve and are often seen here by local people. Volunteers have made hedgehog hibernating boxes which provide warm and dry winter quarters. Squirrels are frequently seen high up in the trees. The pond supports a population of newts.

=== Plants ===
There is a diversity of plants, especially in the meadow area. Some recently seen plants include birdsfoot trefoil, bloody cranesbill, corncockle, cowslip, dog rose, evening primrose, field speedwell, lesser periwinkle, Michaelmas daisy, oxeye daisy, vipers bugloss, sweet violet, lucerne, wild gladiolus, green alkanet, herb-robert, lesser celandine, marsh marigold, purple loosestrife, yellow flag, wild strawberry, and yarrow. Some of these have been introduced, others found their own way here.

=== Trees and shrubs ===
Tree species include English oak, Caucasian oak, Turkey oak, holm oak and sessile oak, rowan, ash, lime, spindle, hazel, laburnum, apple, cotoneaster, hawthorn and silver birch.

=== Plant galls ===
The site has a good variety of galls, which have been surveyed in recent years, including some rarities. Some of the wasp-induced galls have a life cycle based on English and introduced Turkey oak. These species have done well as a result of the two species being present together. On oak, Andricus lucidus (hedgehog gall) and Andricus aries (ramshorn gall) are present. The well known robin’s pincushion (Diplolepis rosae) - a wasp gall on dog rose – can be found periodically. The site also has a number of mite and Hemiptera induced galls. A gall of note is Cryptosiphum artemisiae found on mugwort. C. artemisiae is a Hemiptera gall - of which the aphid inducers are preyed on by larvae of hoverfly species Triglyphus primus.
