= Fellows Road =

Road in London, England

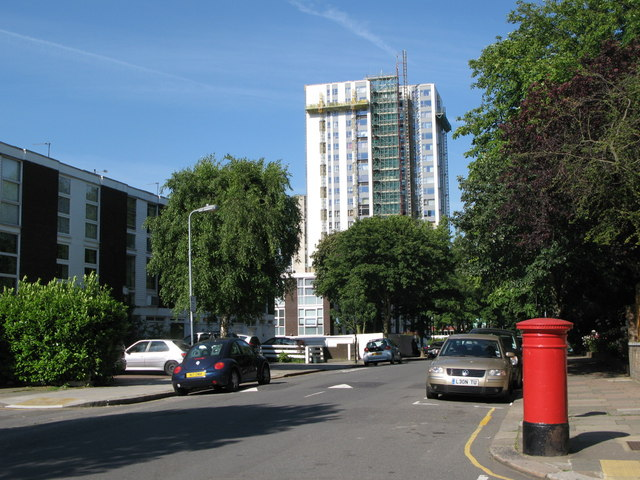
- Fellows Road in 2008

- Location within Greater London
- Part of: Eton College Estate (North)
- Length: 0.568 mi (0.914 km)
- Location: Belsize Park, London
- Postal code: NW3
- Nearest metro station: Swiss Cottage; Chalk Farm
- Coordinates: 51°32′38″N 0°10′01″W

Fellows Road is a two-lane road in the London Borough of Camden, just north of Central London. It is on the Eton College estate, a series of roads and houses built to replace the area destroyed in World War II, on land owned by Eton College. The road was originally built in 1873 and finished between 1874 and 1894, and named after the college's fellows.

Between Fellows Road and the parallel Adelaide Road is the Chalcots housing estate, which has four tower blocks: Dorney, Bray, Burnham and Taplow (all named after places near Eton). Entrances to the road can be accessed via Merton Rise, King's College Road, Winchester Road and Primrose Hill Road. The road also has a number of small closes, including Brocas Close, Tobin Close, Huson Close, Briary Close and Hornby Close.

== Appearance ==
The road has many large, grey brick houses, decorated with Corinthian capitals. These are from the Victorian era and were designed by Samuel Cumming. Unlike the south side of the road, these structures were mostly undamaged from the Blitz in World War II (though, the east part of the road was destroyed and had to be rebuilt as part of the Chalcots Estate development). When entering from the east direction, one can see that the left side of the road is decorated by many brown and white modern, cube shaped households. These were constructed after World War II, where the south side of the road was bombed in an air raid by the Blitz. Construction finished in 1968 and the south part of the road was named Chalcots Estate.
