= Adelaide Road =

Street in Swiss Cottage, London

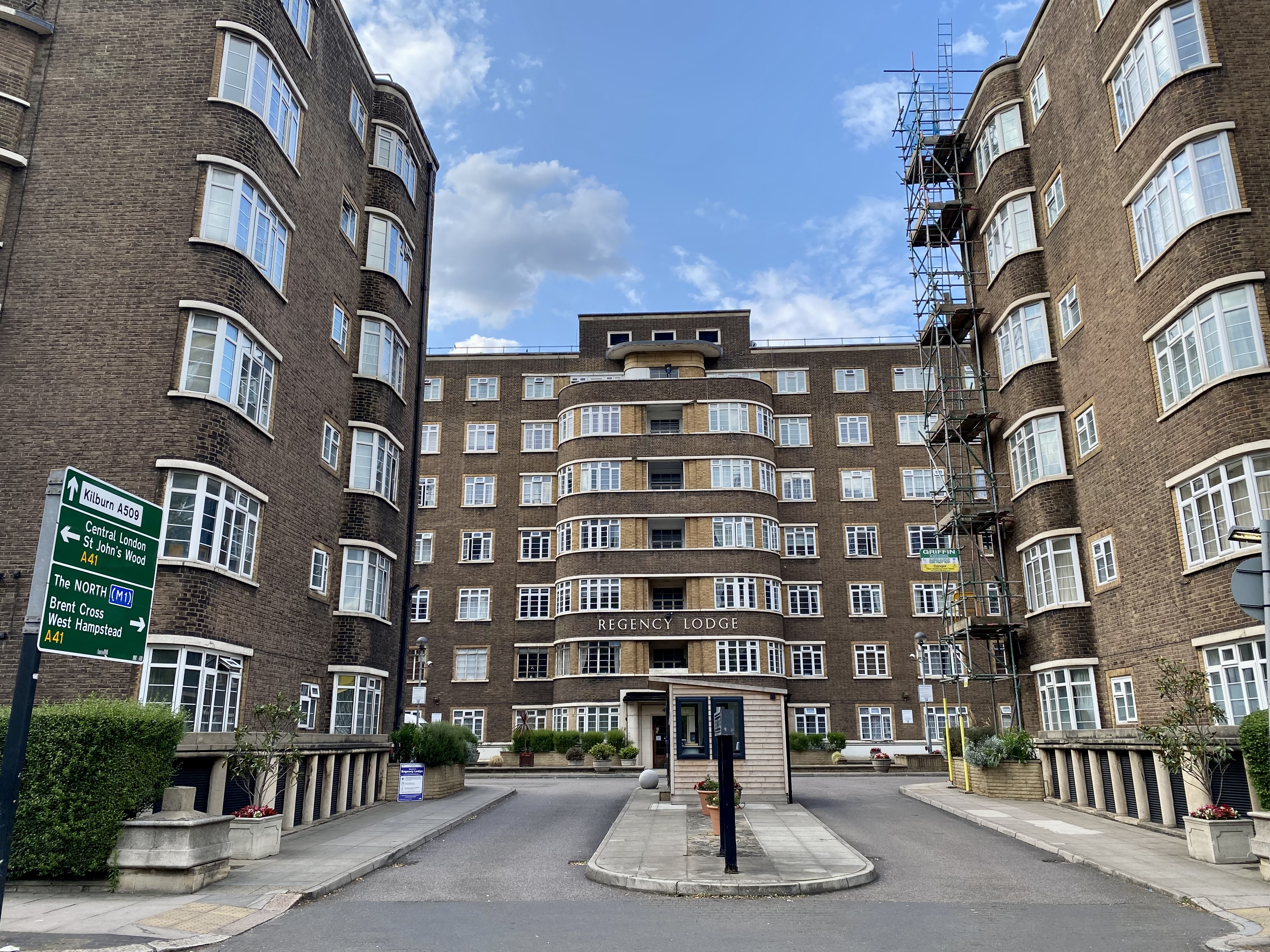
Regency Lodge, a late 1930s development near Swiss Cottage.

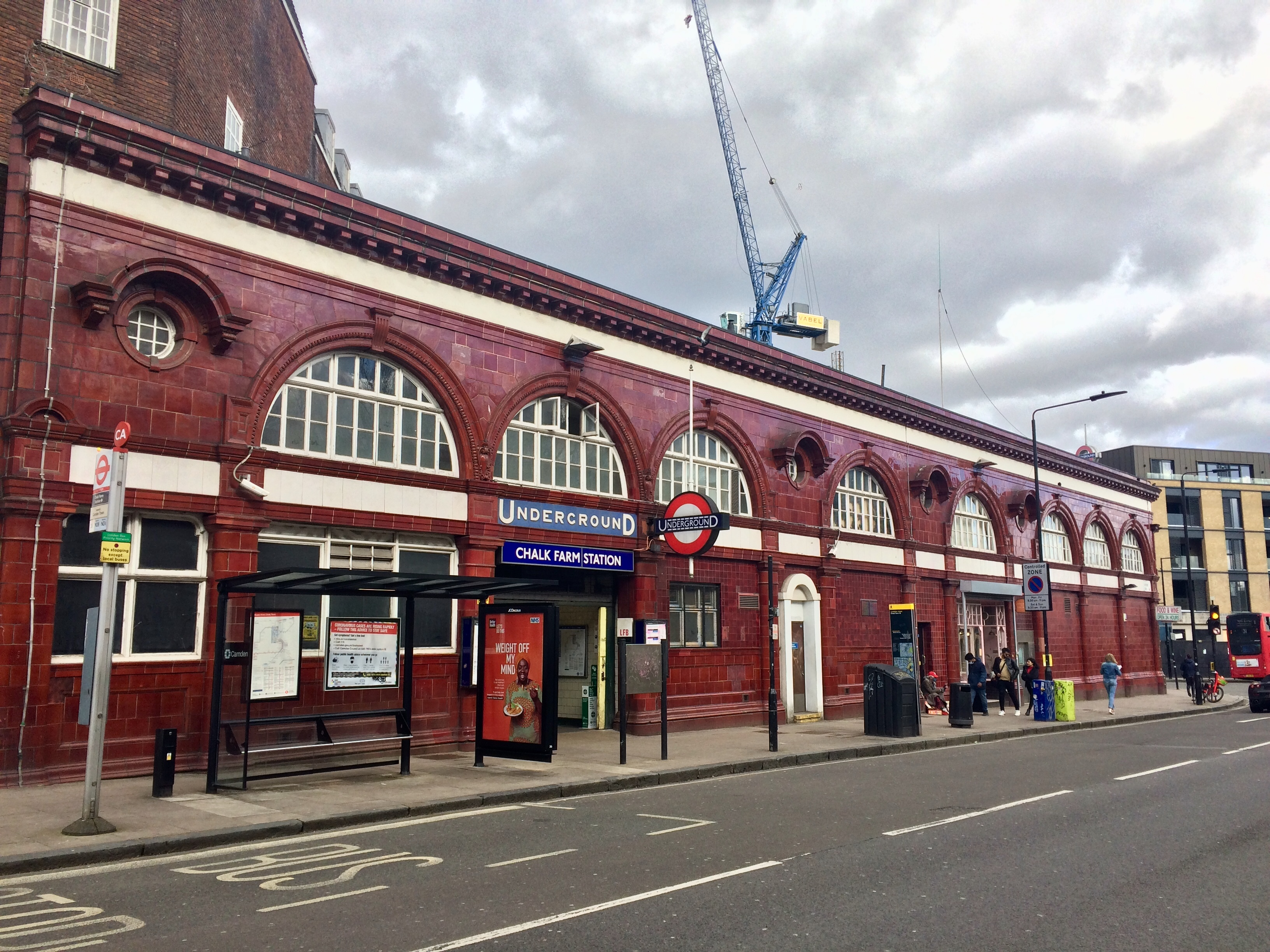
Chalk Farm tube station entrance on Adelaide Road.

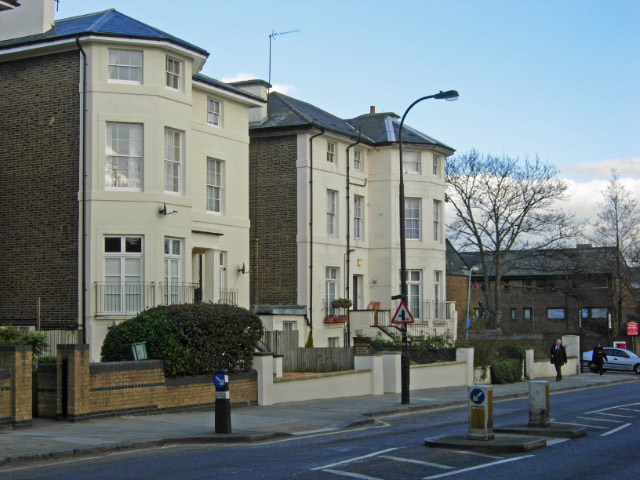
Older surviving buildings in the street.

Adelaide Road is a street in London running east to west between Chalk Farm and Swiss Cottage. Located in the London Borough of Camden it is part of the longer B509 route which continues as Belsize Road through South Hampstead. The Belsize Park area of Hampstead is to its north while Primrose Hill is to the south. It runs parallel to Fellows Road and Eton Avenue. Along its route it meets or is crossed by several streets including Primrose Hill Road and Avenue Road. At its eastern end is Chalk Farm tube station at the junction with Haverstock Hill, which opened in 1907. It takes its name from Queen Adelaide, wife of William IV.

Until the Regency era the area was largely rural, part of the Manor of Chalcot belonging to Eton College. As John Nash's development around Regent's Park neared completion, there was increasing demand for new housing for London's rapidly growing population. In 1824 the estate was surveyed and in 1829 permission for building was granted. Delays caused by the construction of the Birmingham to Euston railway meant that, although the street was laid out and named in 1830, housebuilding did not begin around 1839. Nonetheless, Adelaide Road was one of the first streets in the area to be constructed and featured neoclassical designed by Samuel Cuming. Directly to its south was the Primrose Hill Tunnel, the first railway tunnel in London, which was completed before Adelaide Road was begun. One of the first buildings in the street was the Adelaide Tavern, now demolished. Another pub The Viceroy, built in the 1850s, also briefly used the name before its own demolition.

The street was particularly badly damaged during German bombing raids during the Second World War. Postwar redevelopment led to the construction of new housing estates, such as the Chalcots Estate leaving few traces of the older Victoria era street. Chalk Farm tube station is now Grade II listed as is the 1930s Regency Lodge by Swiss Cottage. The Adelaide Nature Reserve is located to the south of the road. Swiss Cottage Library stands on the northern side with The Hampstead Figure sculpture in front of it.

== Bibliography ==
- Bebbington, Gillian. London Street Names. Batsford, 1972.
- Cherry, Bridget & Pevsner, Nikolaus. London 4: North. Yale University Press, 2002.
- Thompson, Francis Michael Longstreth. Hampstead; Building a Borough, 1650-1964. Routledge & Kegan Paul, 1974.
- Wade, Christopher. The Streets of Belsize. Camden History Society, 1991.
