= St Saviour's Church, Hampstead =

Anglican church in Chalk Farm, London

Coordinates: 51.5449°N 0.1578°W

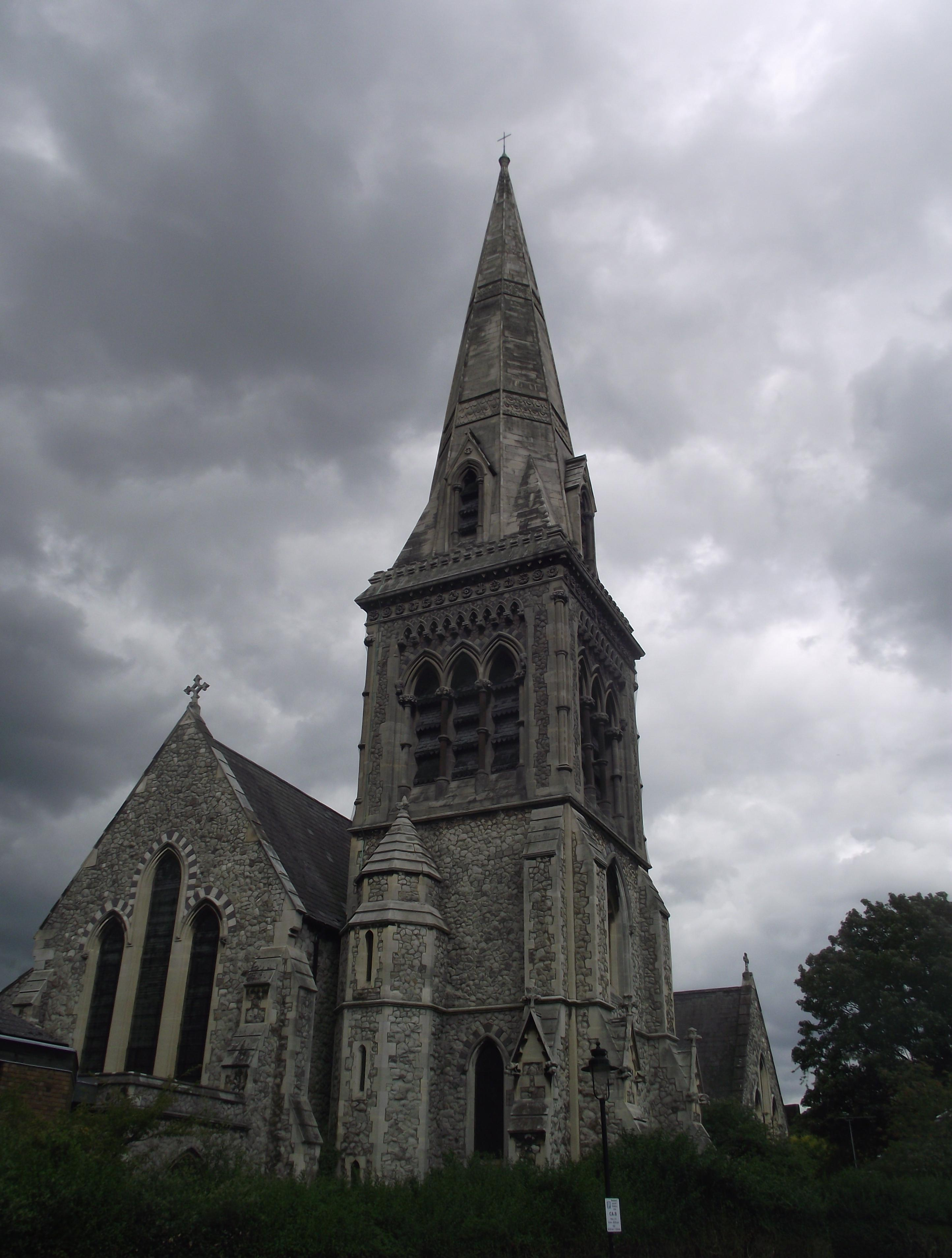
St Saviour's in 2017

St Saviour's Church is an Anglican church in Chalk Farm. It occupies a Grade II listed building designed by Edward Middleton Barry in a Gothic Revival style.

The building was the first independently designed work of Barry. It is built largely in kentish ragstone, with most of the structure completed in 1856. The spire and tower, also designed by Barry, were finished in 1864. Later additions include a vestry by Ewan Christian in 1882 and a lengthened chancel by Caröe in 1902. The building was listed in 1974.
