= Chalcots Estate =

Housing estate in the London Borough of Camden

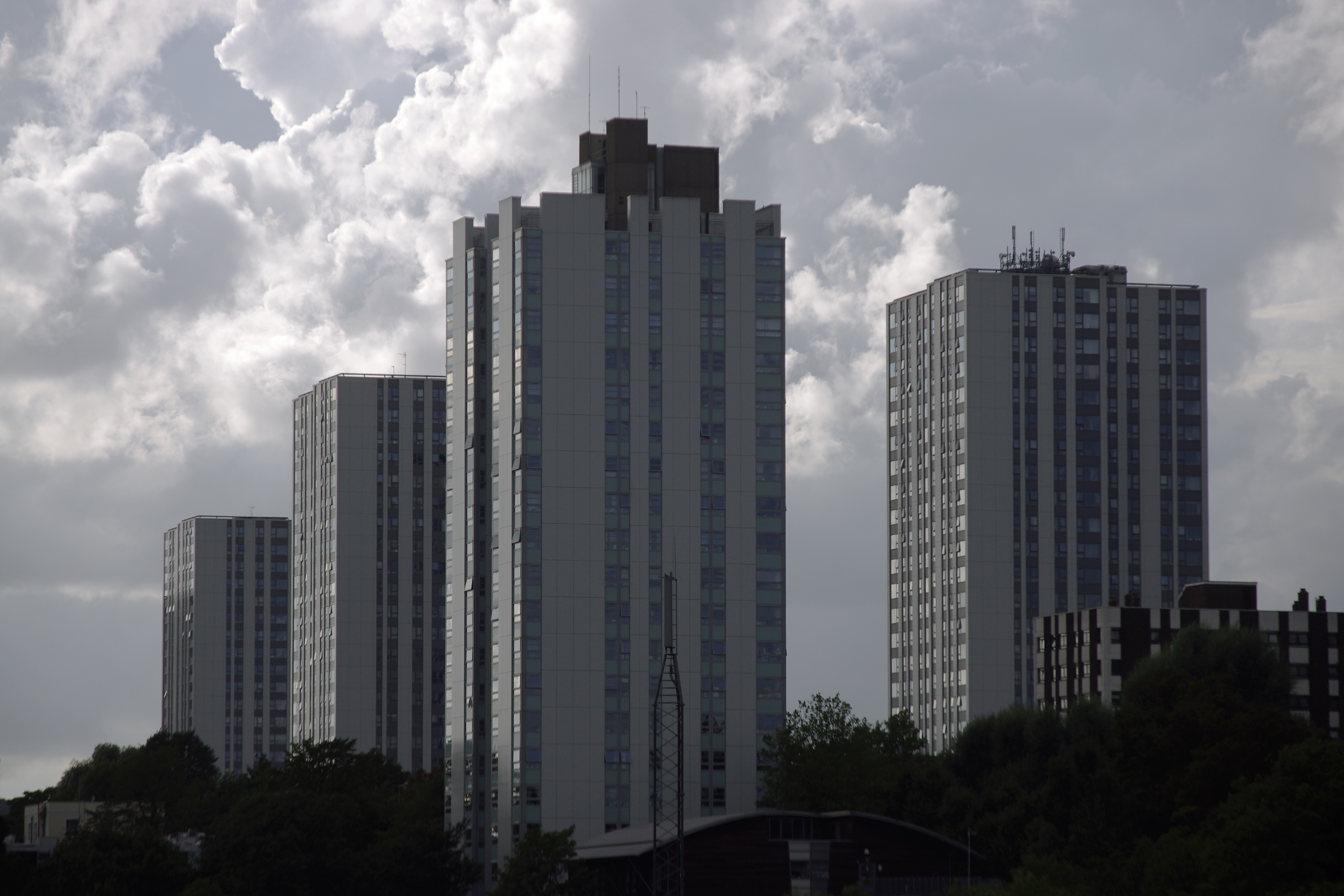
- Towers on the Chalcots Estate, in 2010
- Interactive map of the Chalcots Estate area

General information
- Location: Adelaide Road and Fellows Road, Swiss Cottage, London
- Coordinates: 51°32′36.6″N 0°10′00.8″W
- Year built: 1967–1968
- Completed: 1968
- Renovated: 2006 (cladding)
- Owner: Camden London Borough Council

Technical details
- Material: Concrete
- Floor count: 23 (Taplow, Burnham, Bray, Dorney), 19 (Blashford)

Design and construction
- Architect: Dennis Lennon and Partners

Chalcots Estate is a council housing estate on Adelaide Road and Fellows Road in Swiss Cottage in the London Borough of Camden. It was designed by Dennis Lennon and Partners. The Chalcots Estate was built on land owned by Eton College, which is reflected in the names of the individual buildings.

The Estate comprises five high-rise tower blocks with a total of 711 or 717 flats, in four identical 23-storey towers (Taplow, Burnham, Bray, and Dorney), and one smaller 19-storey block (Blashford). The blocks were built in two stages, with approvals being given in 1965 and 1966, and construction in 1967 and 1968.

In 2012, there was a fire in the estate's Taplow Block, where the fire-resistant rock-wool insulation and fire-resistant sealant between floors meant that the fire was contained.

== Cladding issues ==
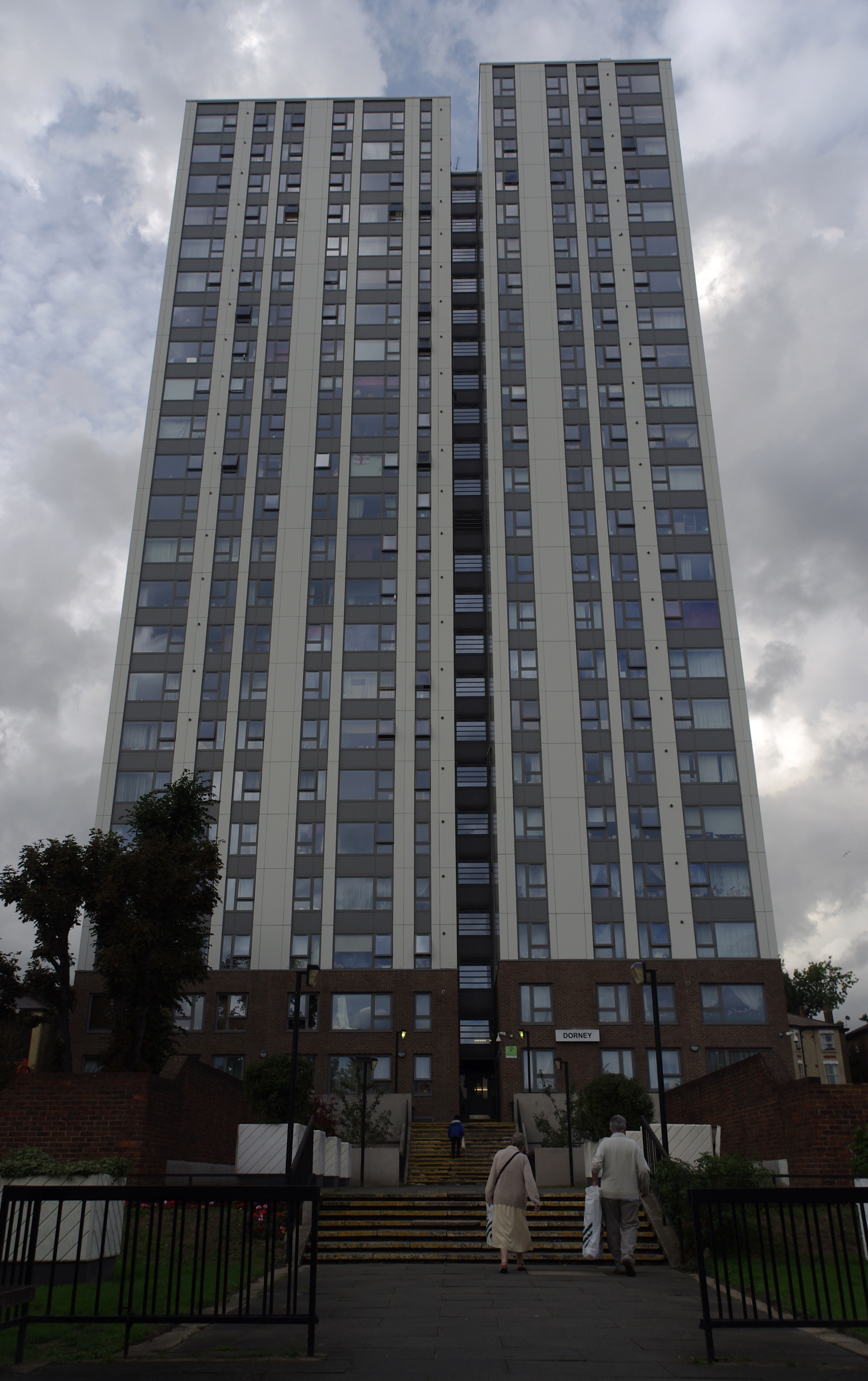
The Dorney Tower in 2010, showing the cladding

On 22 June 2017, following the Grenfell Tower fire, Camden Council said that it would remove similar outer cladding panels that were added to the five blocks in a 2006 refurbishment by the same firms who renovated Grenfell Tower, Rydon. However, Camden Council stated that the insulation used "significantly differs" from that on Grenfell Tower, as it included "fire-resistant Rockwool insulation designed to prevent the spread of fire and fire-resistant sealant between floors, designed to stop a high-intensity flat fire from spreading to neighbouring flats". On 23 June, Camden Council stated that 800 homes in the five tower blocks were being evacuated in order to undertake "urgent fire safety works". On 24 June, 83 people were refusing to leave, and council leader Georgia Gould said this would "become a matter for the fire services".

By 31 July, the decision had been reversed and residents were ordered to vacate the temporary accommodation and move back into the flats. An issue with fire doors had been found and rectified. No information had been given on the safety of the cladding. A resident, Letitia Esposito, challenged the decision in the high court. On the 31 July 2020, the high court case was rejected in the Royal Courts of Justice by Judge Juliet May.

== Notable residents ==
Drum and bass artist Goldie lived for ten years at the Dorney Tower flat of film maker and photographer Gus Coral.
