= Avenue Road, London =

Street in Camden, England

Avenue Road
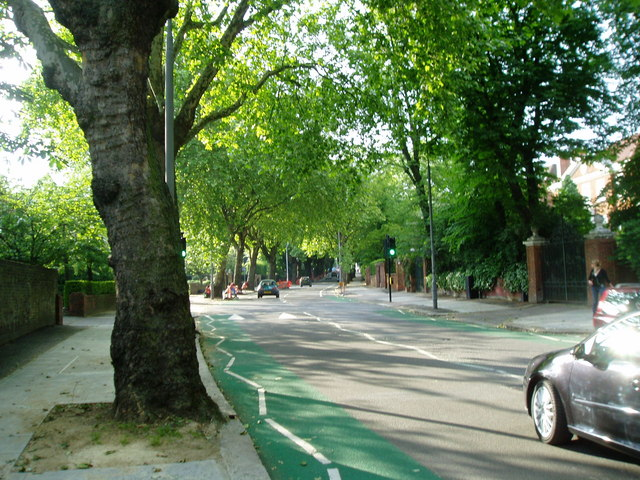

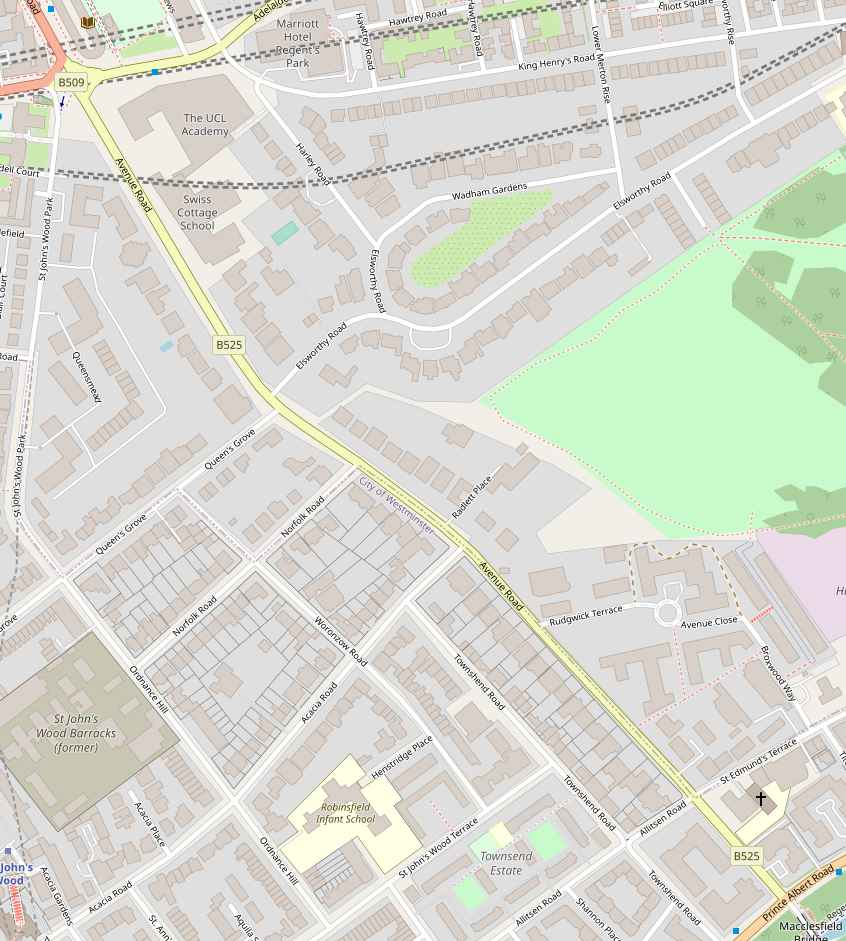
- Owner: London Borough of Camden
- Length: 1,536 m (5,039 ft)
- Location: London, England
- Postal code: NW1, NW3, NW8
- Coordinates: 51.538555°N 0.169376°W

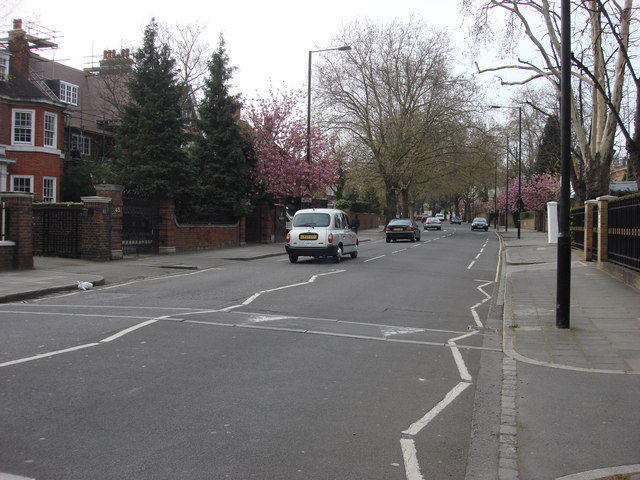
Avenue Road, looking north

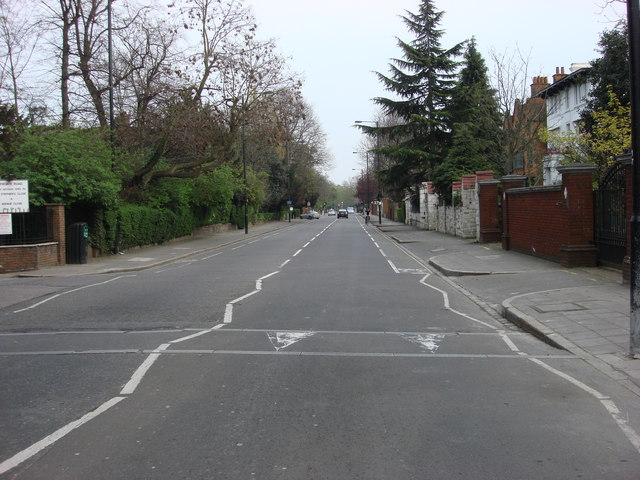
Avenue Road, looking south

Avenue Road is a street in the Swiss Cottage and St John's Wood districts of London, known for having some of the highest home property prices in the United Kingdom. The street is popular with buyers who have replaced older houses with large mansions.

== Location ==
Avenue Road forms the entire length of the B525, and runs from the Swiss Cottage gyratory system in the northwest to Prince Albert Road, near Regent's Park, in the southeast. Its short continuation southwards, on a bridge over the Regent's Canal, is called North Gate. Avenue Road is 1 km long. It has a junction near Swiss Cottage with Adelaide Road.

== History ==
Development of the Hampstead portion of Eyre Estate (known today as St. John's Wood) began in 1802 and was led by architect John Shaw Sr. In 1826, after the Finchley Road Act 1826 (7 Geo. 4. c. xc) was passed, a new road that headed northward into the Hampstead portion of Eyre Estate's land was developed. and was built by 1829. By 1842, several houses called Regent's Villas were built in the Hampstead section of Avenue Road, and by 1852, 33 houses had been built.

By the late 18th century, the street had become home to some of the most famous London artists and writers, including James McNeill Whistler and John Singer Sargent.

Although the road had had many large expensive houses for many years, in the late 2010s and early 2020s, Avenue Road saw a flurry of high-net-worth buyers who purchased houses to replace them with brand-new mega mansions.

== Property prices ==
The road mainly comprises large, detached freehold "villa-style properties" and is a key thoroughfare into central London. It leads into Regent's Park and is widely considered to be one of London's most desirable residential destinations. A 2020 survey completed by Lloyds Bank declared Avenue Road as one of the most expensive residential streets in the world and the most expensive in London. As of early 2021, current sale prices averaged over £30.5 million.

In 2015, an 11-bedroom mansion became, at the time, one of Britain's most expensive properties ever after selling for £40 million. The mansion was initially listed for £65 million but failed to find a buyer at that price point.

In 2017, a house owned by the late property developer Harry Hyams and designed in 1954 by the architect Richard Seifert was listed for sale at £16 million, with the expectation that the new owner would replace it with a larger house.

In 2019, a vast double plot of about one acre sold for £38.5 million, with planning permission for a new 36,000-square-foot mega-mansion, which would make it one of London's largest private homes.

In 2020, a 15,000 square-foot plot of land with a 6,000 square-foot mansion was put on the market with plans to develop a £40 million Malibu-style home. As of early 2021, there are believed to be 12 mansions under construction on the street with a total value of £500 million.

In 2021, a 27,000 square foot mansion was put on the market at £75 million.

== Buildings ==
At the north end are the Grade II listed block of flats and shops known as Regency Lodge (designed by Robert Atkinson and A.F.B. Anderson) and the Grade II listed architecturally notable Swiss Cottage Central Library, designed by Sir Basil Spence.

At the south end is Number 25, a detached villa built around 1830–1840 on the Portland Estate that is also Grade II listed.
