= Swiss Cottage Library =

Library in Camden, London

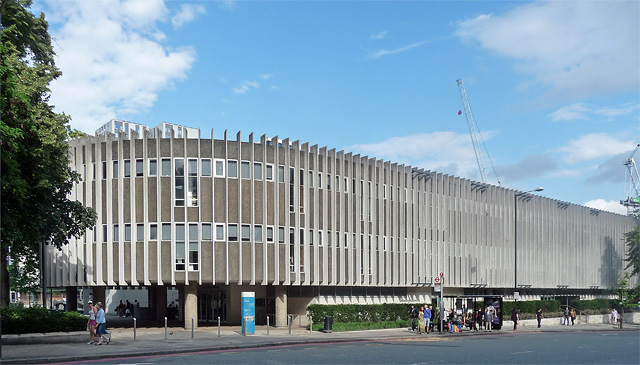
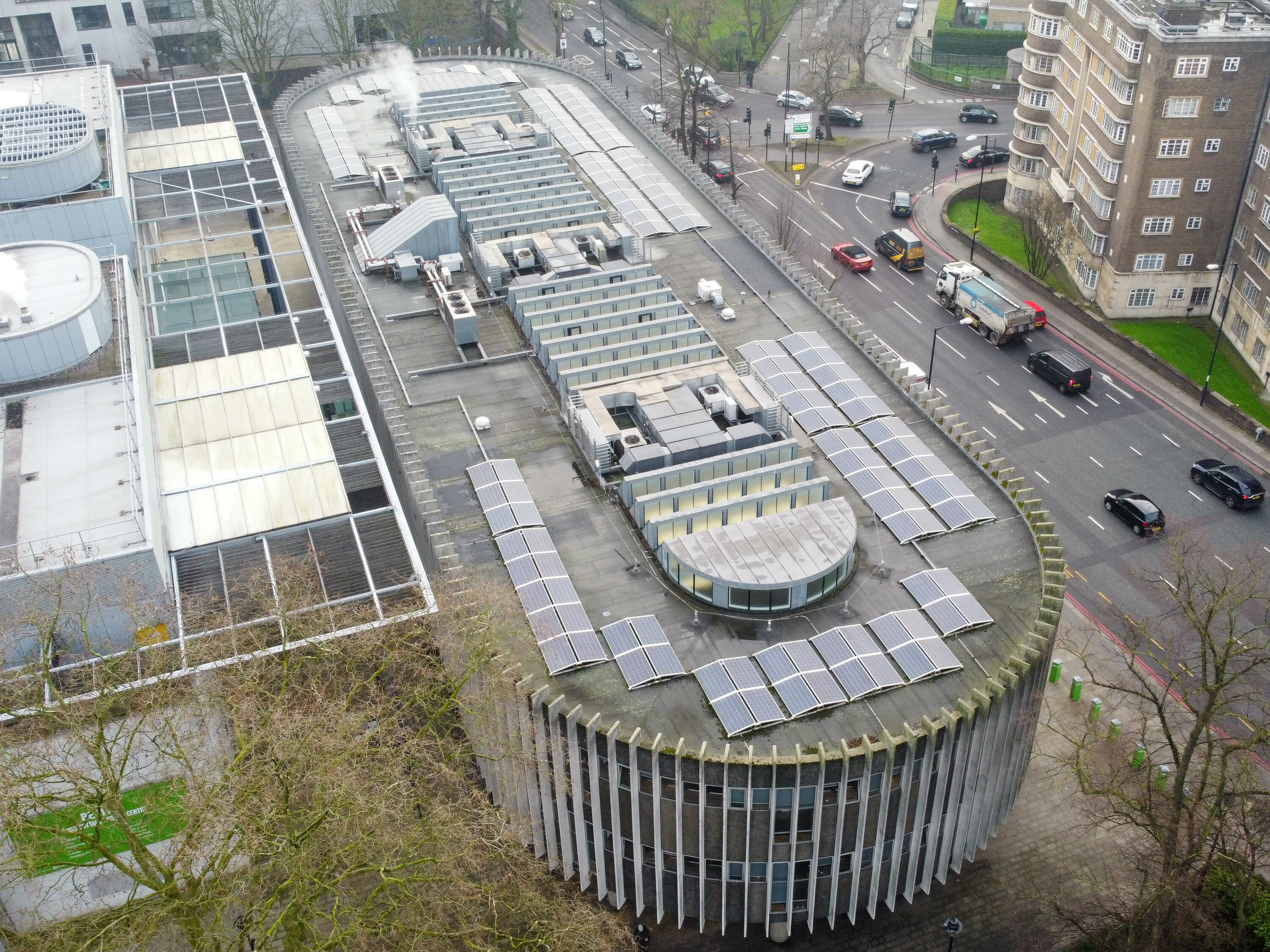
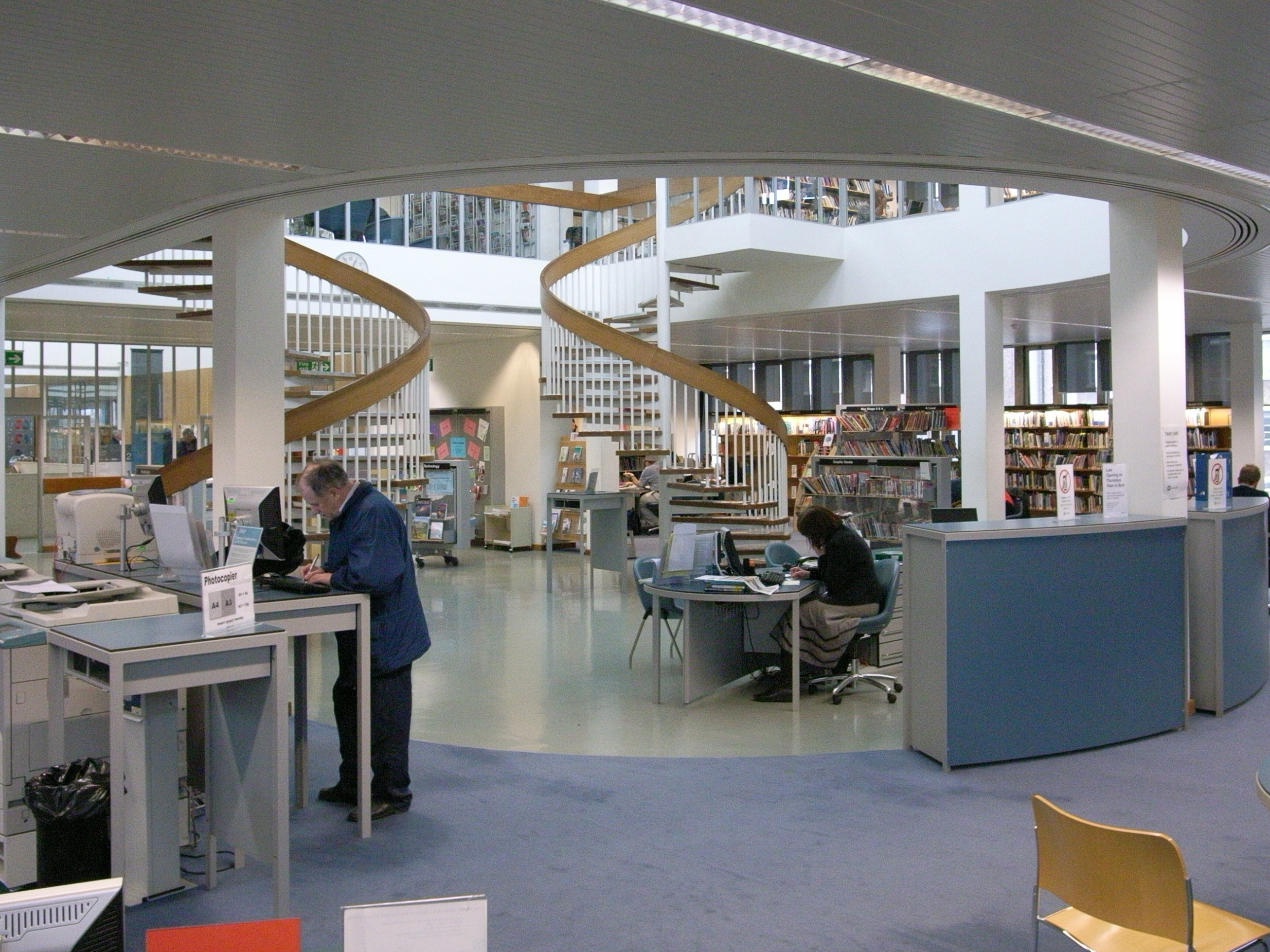
- Clockwise from top: length as viewed from Finchley Road; ground floor of the reference library; south-facing aerial view
- 51.5424°N 0.1733°W
- Type: public library
- Established: 10 November 1964; 61 years ago as Hampstead Central Library
- Architect: Basil Spence
- Service area: London Borough of Camden

Collection
- Size: 128,650

Other information
- Website: www.camden.gov.uk/swiss-cottage-library

Building details

General information
- Location: 88 Avenue Road; London NW3 3HA
- Construction started: 31 December 1962; 63 years ago
- Cost: £200,000 (equivalent to £5.9 million in 2024)
- Owner: London Borough of Camden

Technical details
- Floor count: 3
- Floor area: 5,470 square metres (58,880 sq ft)

Listed Building – Grade II
- Official name: Swiss Cottage Library
- Designated: 2 December 1997
- Reference no.: 1272259

Swiss Cottage Library is a public library in the London Borough of Camden housed in an architectural landmark building on Avenue Road. Designed by Sir Basil Spence of Spence, Bonnington & Collins, it was built between 1963 and 1964.

It replaced the former Metropolitan Borough of Hampstead's main library, Finchley Road Library, which had suffered damage during the Blitz and lacked sufficient capacity. The new library was originally part of a larger civic project designed to regenerate the wider Swiss Cottage area, but following reorganisations in local government only it and the adjoining swimming baths were built.

The building shows a more open, fluid architectural style compared to other contemporary libraries, with distinct fins revolving around the exterior. Opened by Queen Elizabeth II on 10 November 1964, the library has been Grade II listed since 1997, and was refurbished in the early 2000s as part of the Swiss Cottage Centre redevelopment.

== Background ==
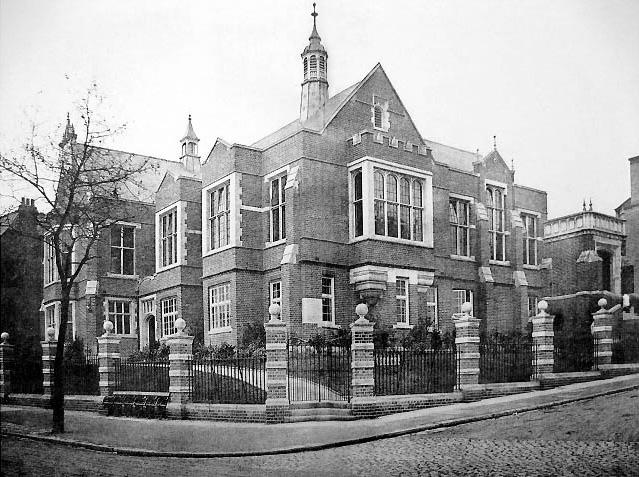
Finchley Road Library as published in a 1900 architecture magazine

The Metropolitan Borough of Hampstead's first library, Kilburn Library, opened in 1894 and was soon succeeded by Finchley Road Library in 1897. Then known as Hampstead Central Library, this became Camden Arts Centre in 1965. By the 1950s, the Central Library was in need of expansion, having served the same role since establishment. Soon after a refurbishment, it suffered severe damage during the Blitz in World War II, leaving it with only half the required capacity. The borough desperately needed more space for books, and incorporated a new library into its plans for a new civic centre to house its headquarters and other services.

The Library Association reported in 1959 that, whilst hardly any new public library buildings had been built, library usage had risen by 75% since 1939, with most buildings being over 50 years old. Post-war, the British government had prioritised housing and education, resulting in wartime restrictions remaining in force and many libraries being designed for fewer users than needed. With additional damage and destruction to other libraries, Hampstead lacked the infrastructure needed for storing and cataloguing media.

== History ==
=== Founding ===
Swiss Cottage Library was planned as part of the Hampstead Civic Centre development by the Metropolitan Borough of Hampstead in the 1950s, which was originally intended to offer a new master site for Hampstead's governance. In 1959, British architect Sir Basil Spence of Spence, Bonnington & Collins created a scheme for the Civic Centre, including a library and sports centre (which contained the swimming baths), on land purchased from the Eyre and Eton College (Chalcots) estates in 1956 at a cost of £200,000 (equivalent to £5.9 million in 2025). The Metropolitan Borough of Hampstead became part of the larger London Borough of Camden under the London Government Act 1963, bringing complications to the scheme: Camden Council instead wanted to focus on its Euston Road developments; Spence described the fate of the project as being "in the lap of the Gods".

As Hampstead's final major infrastructure project, the original "masterplan" was downgraded to include only a sports centre and a library, per demands from the Greater London Council and central government. Furthermore, the library, which was originally intended to be built next to Winchester Road, was instead moved west to be beside Avenue Road, to accommodate the changes.

Construction was undertaken by McAlpine & Sons and was accelerated by the use of a 164 ft (50 m) tower crane, the tallest in the UK at the time. Construction began on 31 December 1962, with the mayor, Luigi Carlo Denza, shovelling the first pile of earth for the site. Succeeding weeks brought difficulties due to unusually heavy snow, leading to concrete needing additional protection. Later building strikes exacerbated the problem, and construction was delayed, but eventually finished in 1964.

Soon after opening the University of Sussex's new library, also by Spence, Queen Elizabeth II opened the library as Hampstead Public Library on 10 November 1964. On opening, the library superseded Finchley Road Library as Hampstead's Central Library. Present, amongst others, were Councillor Luigi Carlo Denza, then Mayor of Hampstead, Basil Spence and Sir Edwin McAlpine, acting head of the library's construction firm at the time. Its title as Hampstead Central Library was later amended in light of the Hampstead's amalgamation and it was renamed as Swiss Cottage Central Library before its shortened name today.

=== Refurbishment and expansion ===
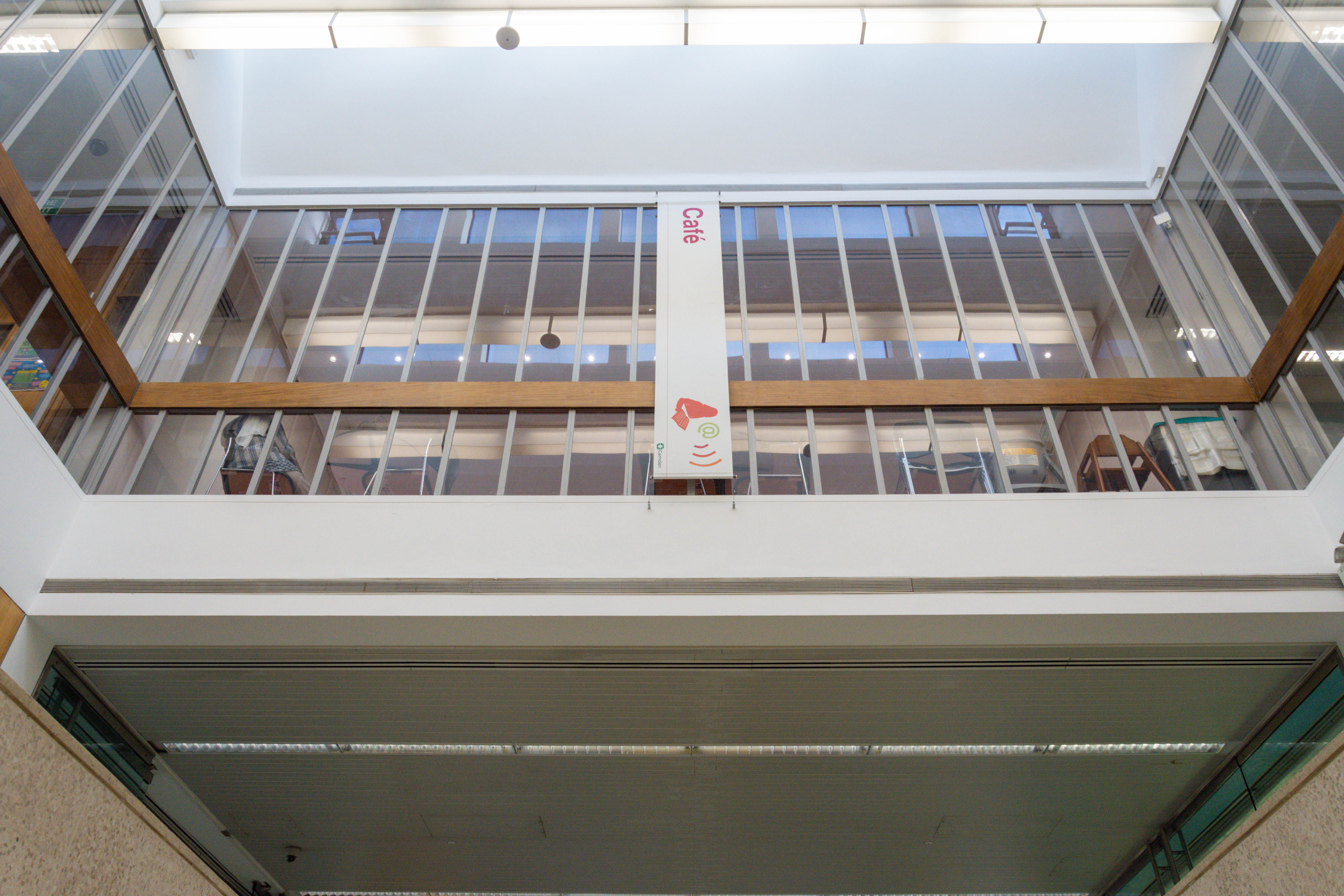
Café added in the refurbishment

In 1989, Camden reported that the swimming baths were underperforming and that Swiss Cottage Library, then being the largest and most used in the borough, had structural issues that required immediate address, even after remedial works in 1984. The council announced in the late 1990s that it intended to regenerate Swiss Cottage Centre, and in 2003 John McAslan & Partners finished a refurbishment of Swiss Cottage Library to include a children's library and improved accessibility facilities, at a cost of £7.9 million (equivalent to £13.4 million in 2024). The overall centre redevelopment plan, including the demolition of Swiss Cottage Sports Centre (with the swimming baths) and the construction of Sir Terry Farrell's Swiss Cottage Leisure Centre on the demolished site, was finished in 2007 at a cost of £85 million.

The accompanying sport centre's demolition was not uncontroversial, as it removed the library's complementing twin, which was factored into new designs. Camden originally planned to demolish the library with Swiss Cottage Sports Centre, but was forced to instead refurbish it as a result of English Heritage designating it with a Grade II listing in December 1997; following the library's refurbishment, the Council acknowledged that demolition "would have been a mistake". The library was officially reopened by Tessa Jowell MP, the then Secretary of State for Culture, Media and Sport, who praised the building as "magnificently refurbished" and "an excellent example of the new face of public libraries".

When Camden began irreversible works on the library in 1996, the then Department for National Heritage warned them of section 3 "spot-listing" powers they held, allowing them to list a building under emergency procedures if it was being considered for listing and at risk of demolition: English Heritage claimed their swift responses had been a result of a lack of notification for the developments in advance. Subsequently, the library was included in English Heritage's "Something Worth Keeping" exhibition of 65 buildings for possible listing, with the public being encouraged to comment: Swiss Cottage Library was later listed alongside the Royal College of Physicians building.

In late 1997, English Heritage controversially decided to list the library, against the council's wishes. Camden Council opposed the listing vehemently from its first consideration in early 1996 and the Evening Standard described the building, alongside the Swimming Baths, as a "drab concrete complex", with the Ham & High additionally recording residents as calling the pair the "ugliest buildings in the borough", though most criticism was directed at the baths. Local councillors were dismayed and the Council argued it was more important to support private investors in funding a new library through the private finance initiative than the maintenance of a building with chronic issues, whilst others argued listing would encourage a more preservative restoration.

The refurbishment, despite being widely acclaimed, was subject to numerous delays and significantly overbudget, in part a result of the project's primary contractor going into administration; McAslan and Camden's relationship was described as "bumpy". Later in 2006, Camden Council sued McAslan & Partners for £500,000 as a result of delays in supply and a cost increase in the contract by £1.5 million. McAslan defended the delays, arguing "It was less than 10% late", a comparatively small delay in construction, and commenting on additional removals needing to be carried out.

In spite of refurbishments, Camden began a major overhaul of its library service in 2011, looking to cut its budget by £2 million due to falling borrower numbers. Swiss Cottage Library, costing the council £1.2 million per year at the time, was on a list of potential libraries to be closed, with McAslan remarking that the library's closure would be a "tragedy" for the community. The library remained open and underwent a low-carbon retrofit in 2023.

== Details ==
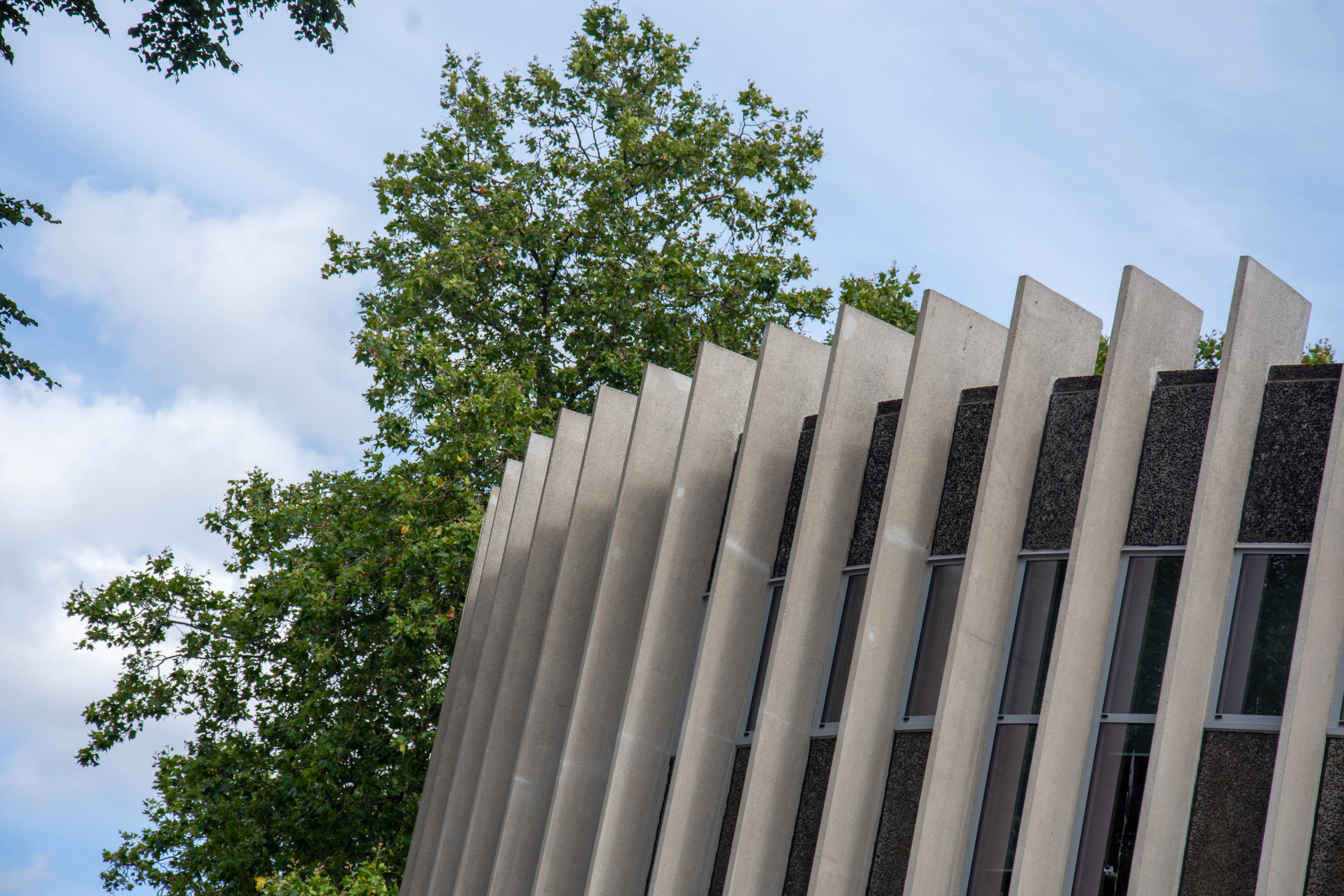
"Fins" on the exterior of the library

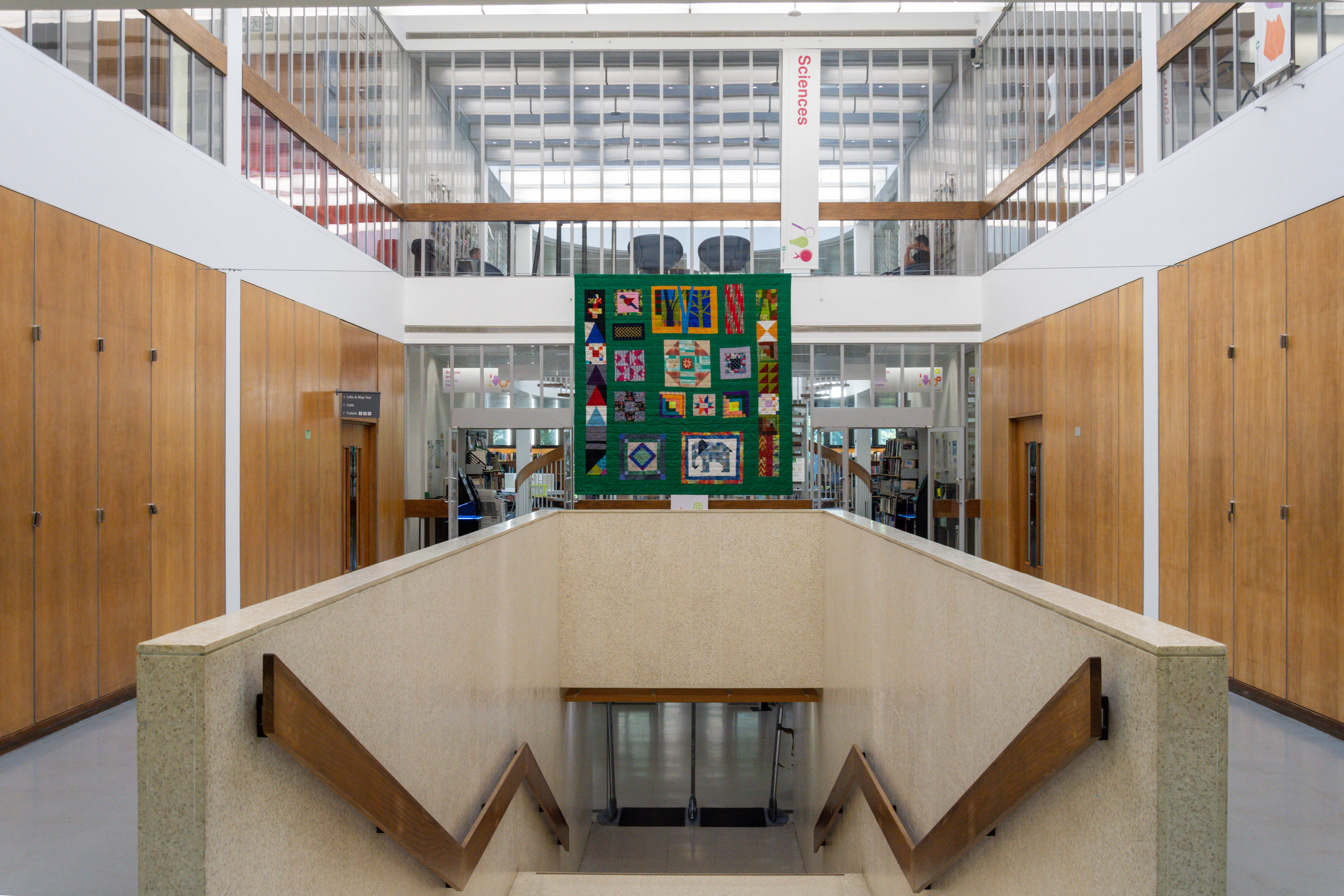
First floor, facing the reference library

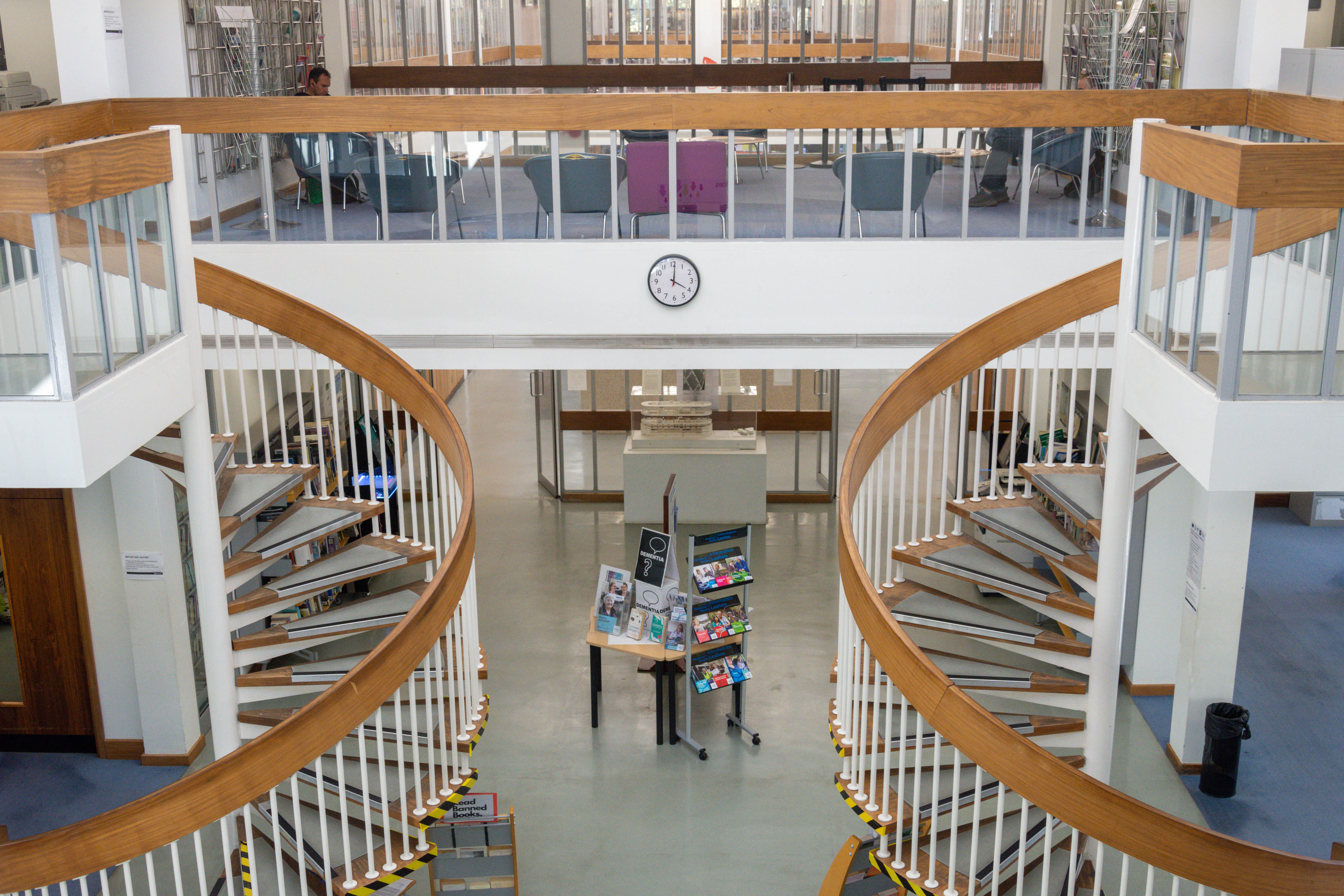
Spiral staircases in the reference library

Built in the ubiquitous Modernist style of the 1960s, Spence took inspiration from the vast open-space and minimalism of Scandinavian libraries, visiting them to take notes on the designs.

=== Exterior ===
The library measures 250 feet (76 m) by 75 feet (23 m) with three storeys, and features 238 narrow 2-tonne "fins" made from a Portland stone aggregate on a pill-shaped structure, resembling the leaves of a book. The fins were designed to protect readers from strong sunlight and additionally block noise pollution, whilst the semi-circular structure was reminiscent of some of Spence's earlier home designs. The library's location in Swiss Cottage, described by Spence as the "gateway to North London", was criticised due to significant noise pollution from the arterial Finchley Road that it borders.

The borough council complemented the library by commissioning a bronze sculpture by F. E. McWilliam, titled The Hampstead Figure, as part of the initial stages of landscaping, which was unveiled by the Queen following the library.

=== Interior ===
Entry is via a semi-circular foyer with the main staircase in front on entrance; originally lending and return counters were positioned on either side, though these were moved to their respective libraries following the refurbishment. Spence made use of a lowered ground floor roof to hide the upper floors, revealing the vast atrium as one ascends the terrazzo-lined staircase, with an initial view of the lending library: the upper floors are cantilevered to create the entrance area. A private staff area from the ground floor leads to a two-storey bookstack, which has capacity for 200,000 books. The wider atrium of the first floor is an exhibition space with the two lending and reference libraries positioned around it, on either pole of the structure. Along the length there is a children's library, with more open usage of colour to contrast with the mostly monotone grey throughout; additionally there are study areas, a periodicals room and formerly the borough's local history department, now relocated to Holborn Library. Nine study carrels were available for library users, including one typing carrel, soundproofed, and an artist's carrel with running water.

Both the lending and reference libraries retain their unique spiral staircases which in the reference library leads to an upper floor that includes 40 desks. The second floor hosts music and philosophy libraries, the latter being the library's specialisation; a café was added alongside in the 2000s refurbishment. Throughout the library transparent partitions are used to create a more fluid and open feeling, in keeping with Spence's Scandinavian inspiration, and consistency through colouring and flooring serves to join the different sections into one, rather than the feeling of a divided library. Furniture was specially designed by Spence for the library, though most was controversially removed in the refurbishment and replaced with furnishings of a similar style. Whilst the RIBA Journal defended the new furniture, calling it "pretty good" for local authority standards, Camden Arts Centre director Jenni Lomax, writing in The Guardian, argued that the removal "[destroyed] its initial integrity". Spence's "floating" bookshelves additionally delineate the floor into casual studying areas: the library's fins also hide the bookcases' backs, preventing an unsatisfying effect from the outside.

== Commentary ==
May I say how pleased I am to come here to see these fine buildings[...]
There is ample opportunity to enrich the mind and exercise the body in surroundings as we can all see are architecturally most attractive.

— Queen Elizabeth II, Opening Speech

Speaking to thousands at the opening, the Queen acclaimed Spence's library as "really wonderful" and described Hampstead as "so interesting". She heralded the specialised facilities available for readers in the library as well as accessibility measures for the disabled.

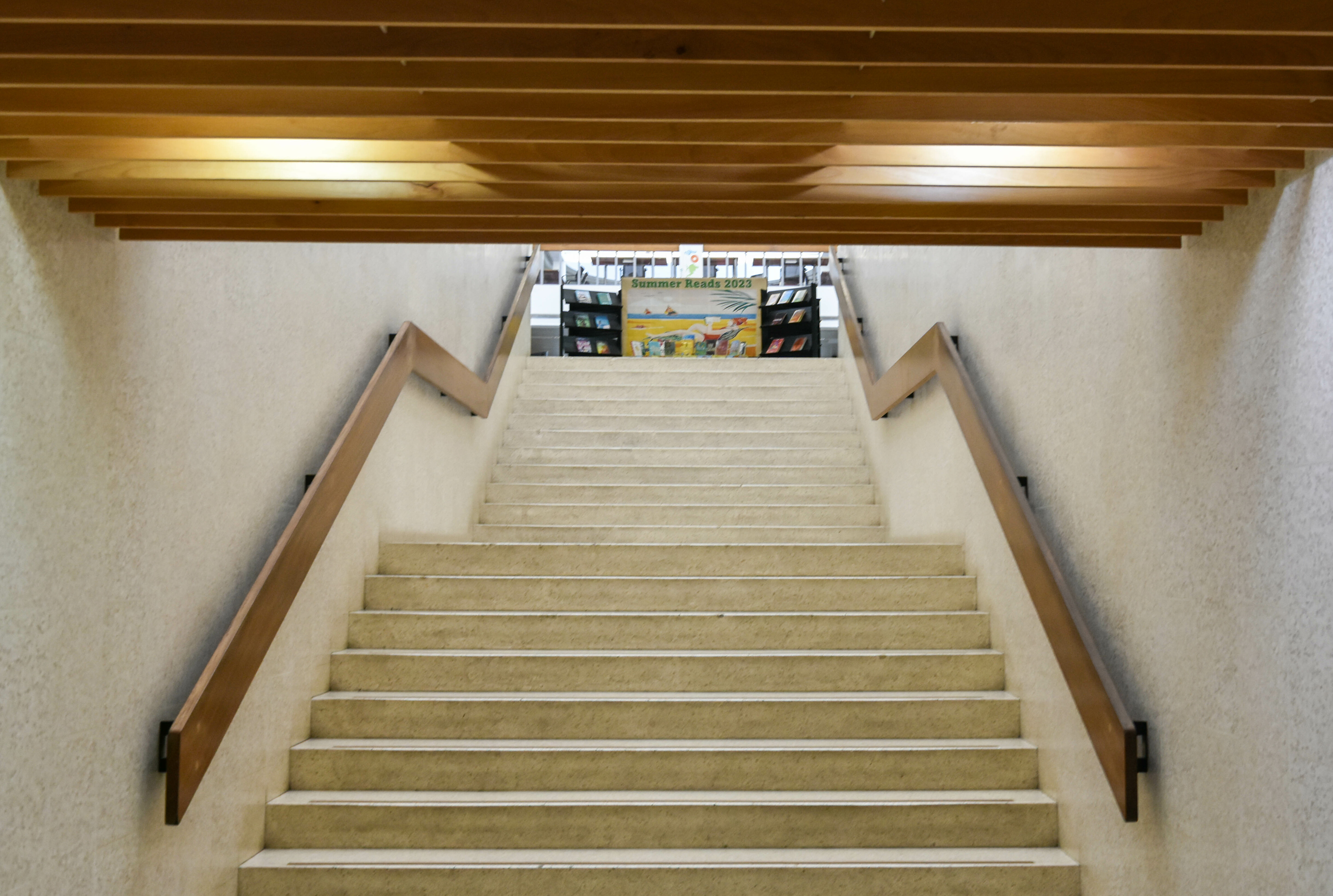
The ground floor's lowered roof

The library was viewed positively by reviewers, with many commenting on the fluidity of the library's line work complementing the louvres of the adjacent swimming baths, bringing together two buildings with great differences in purpose. Concrete Quarterly called the building "spacious and well-equipped", while the Library Association Record was also greatly appreciative, praising it as "another splendid library building", though in their conclusion they noted that it was an "architect's building first, and a librarian's second".

In the Hampstead & Highgate Express however, some residents disapproved of the earlier opening hours compared to libraries in other boroughs like Greenwich, with others defending the older library as "perfectly adequate", with no need to waste the Borough's remaining funds on the project. The library's entrance was criticised as "unimpressive" and the entrance "gloomy" and "uninviting", a side-effect of Spence's design to open up the floors as the visitor progresses up the stairs.

The library's refurbishment was acclaimed by English Heritage as "a success in both architectural and heritage terms". Elain Harwood, writing for Historic England, named it as one of the few post-war libraries that had been "sensitively refurbished", and Historic England also highlighted it "amongst the most ambitious architectural designs for a library found anywhere" in its Grade II listing. CILIP, the UK's professional body for librarians, awarded the refurbishment the Public Library Building Award in 2005, and called the refurbishment "sensitive [and] intelligent" in its journal.
