= The Hampstead Figure =

Sculpture by F. E. McWilliam

Coordinates: 51°32′32″N 0°10′21″W

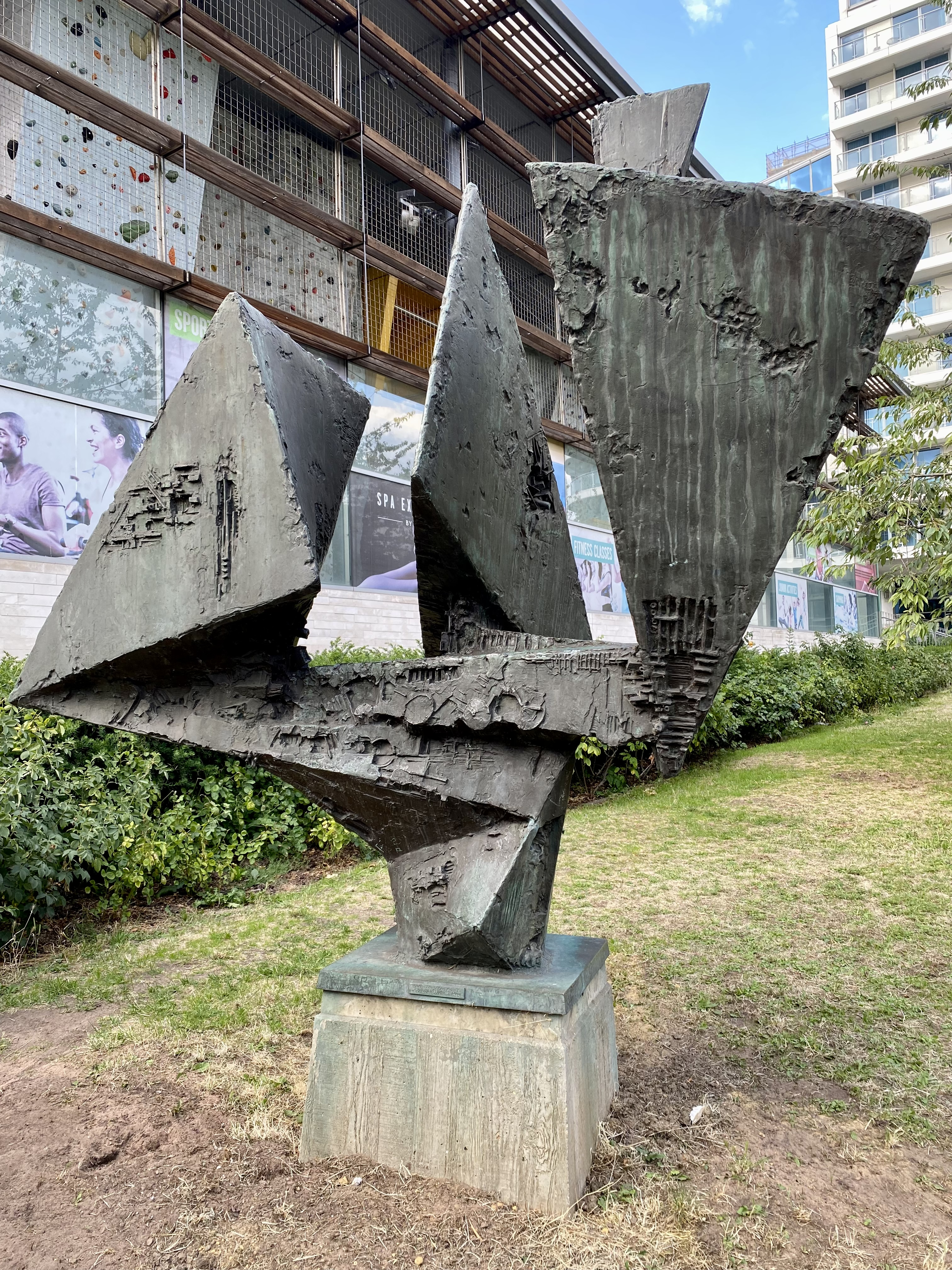
- Location: London, England
- Type: Sculpture
- Material: Bronze
- Completion date: 1964

The Hampstead Figure is an abstract bronze sculpture by F. E. McWilliam. It was commissioned by Basil Spence and was completed in 1964 for the new Hampstead Civic Centre. It was moved in 2019 to its present location on the Adelaide Road side of the Swiss Cottage Library.

The sculpture represents a reclining female figure in abstract form in bronze. It is sited on a plinth. It is inscribed "The Hampstead Figure, 1964" and signed by McWilliam.

The National Heritage List for England listing describes it as forming a "close and complementary grouping" with the civic buildings, which include the Swiss Cottage Library.

The Hampstead Figure was listed at Grade II on the National Heritage List for England in August 1999.

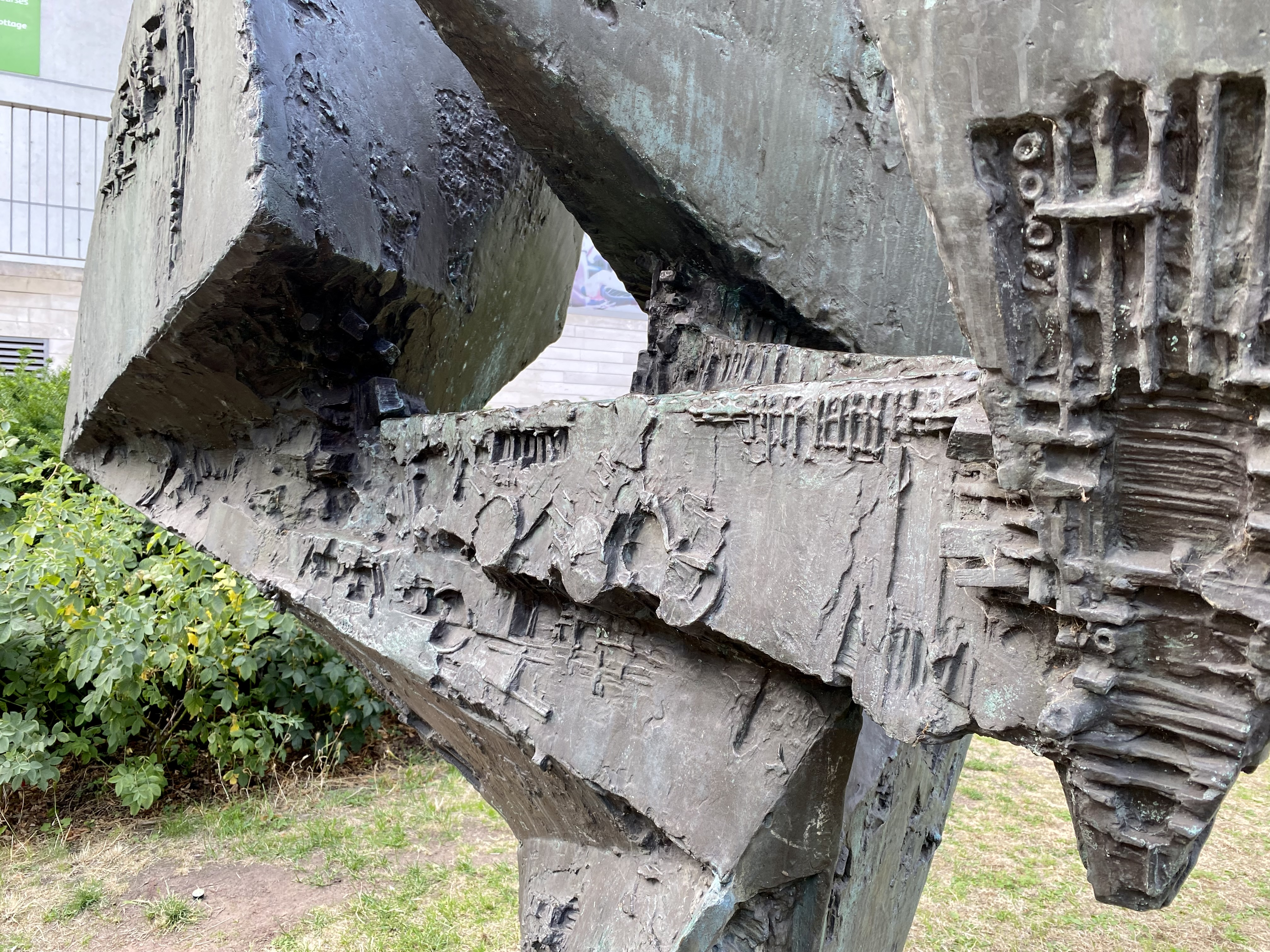
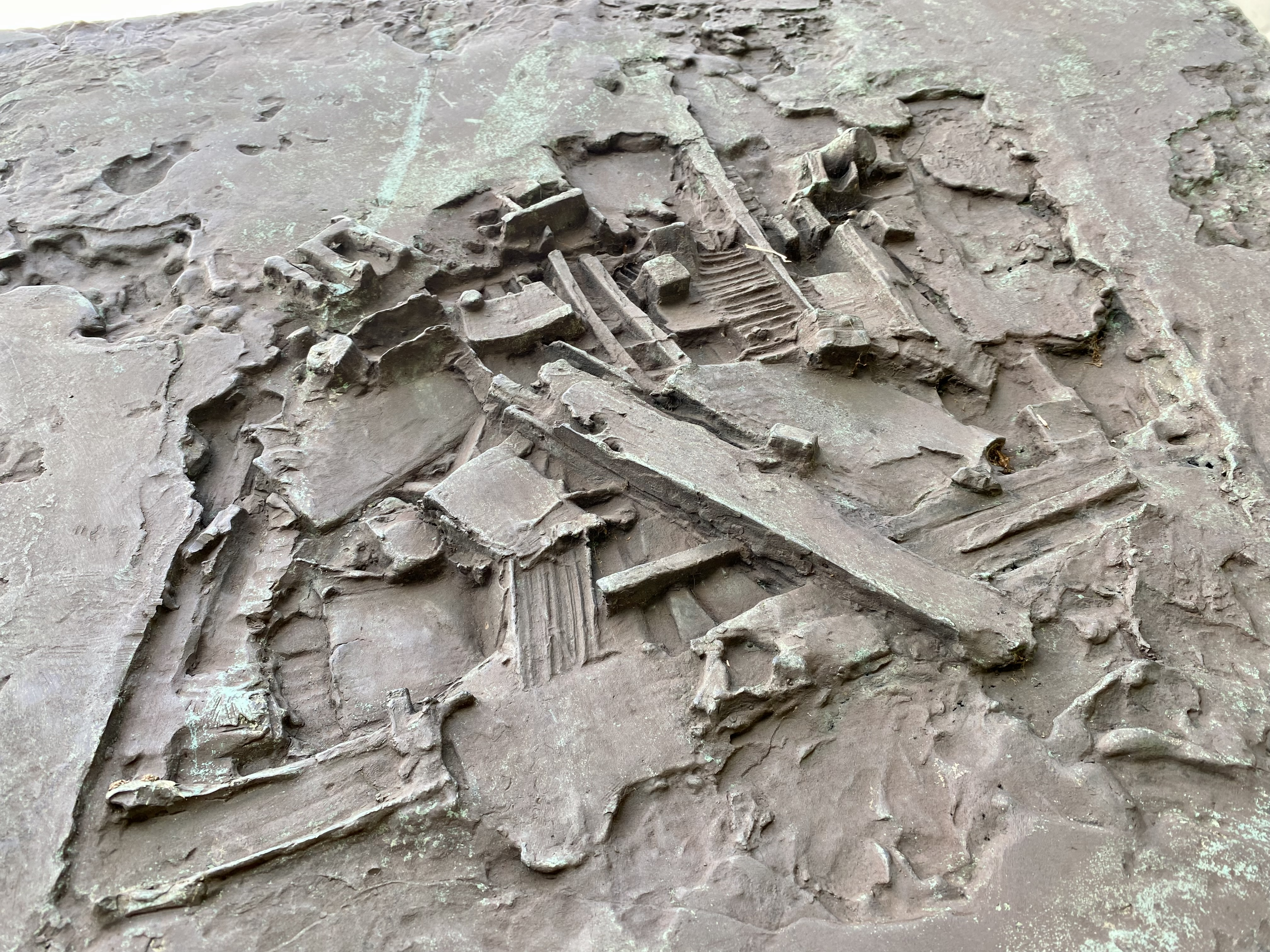
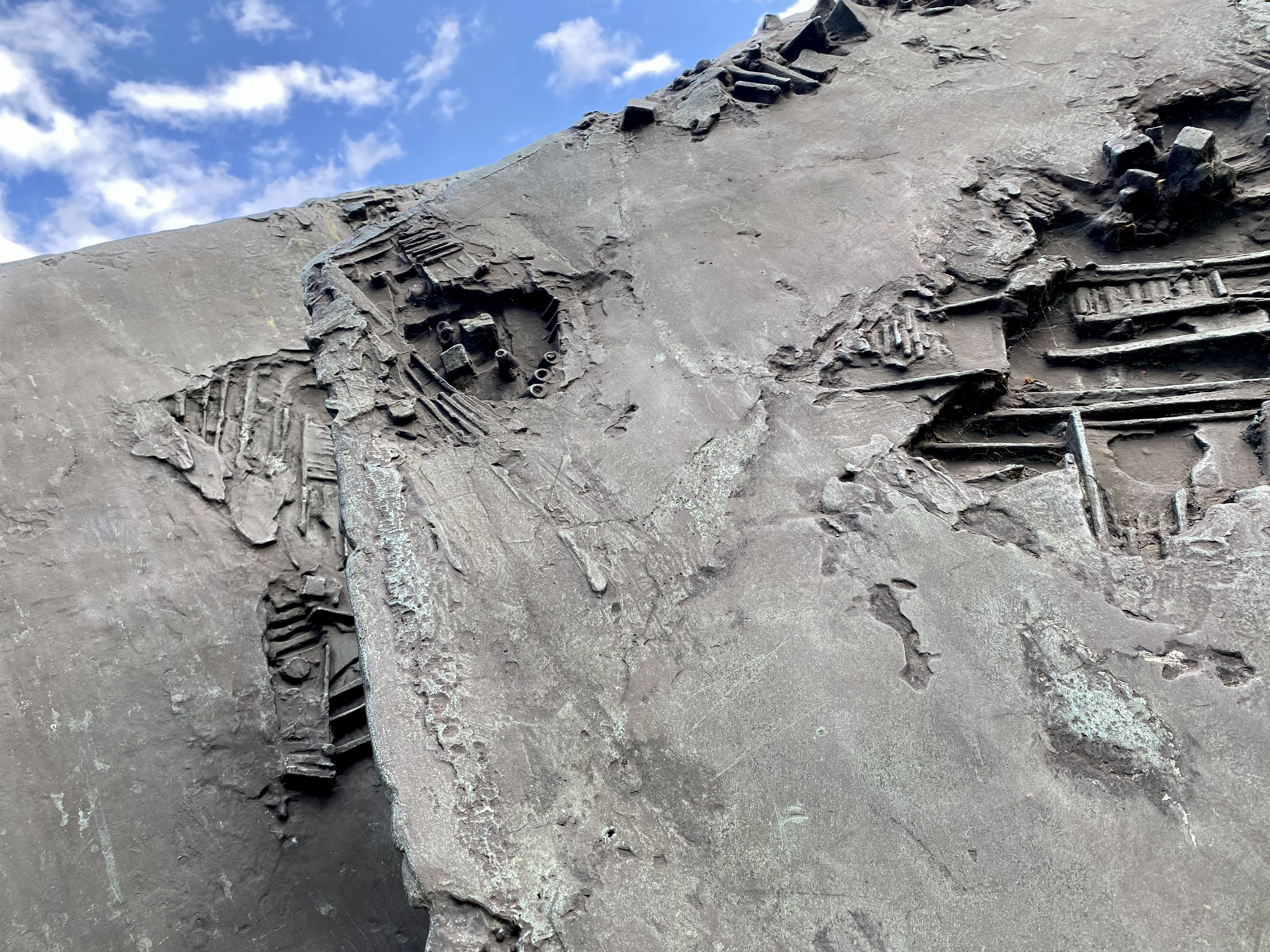
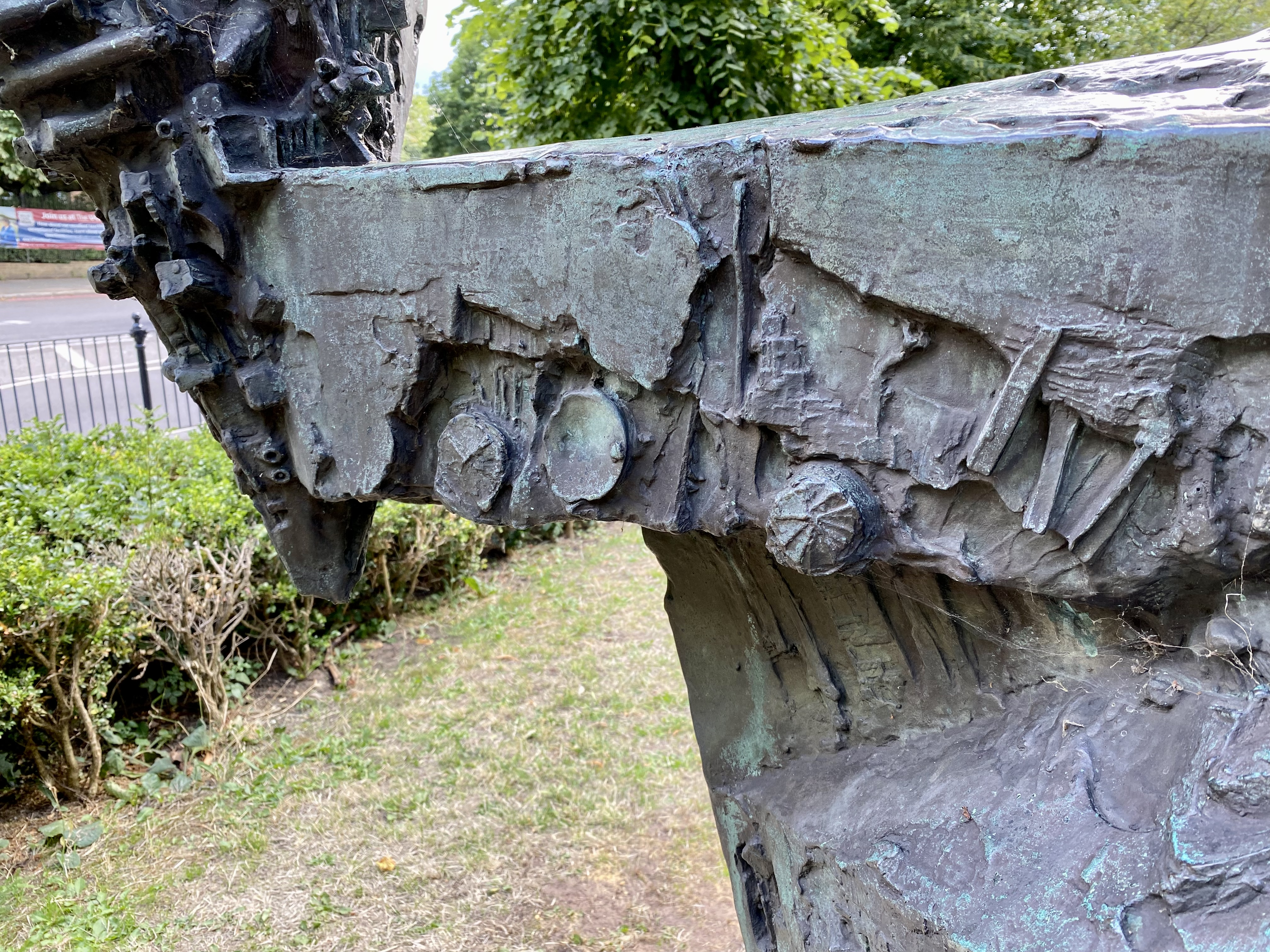
Details in the Hampstead Figure
