= Chalk Farm tube station =

London Underground station

Chalk Farm
- The station building on Adelaide Road
- Interactive map of Chalk Farm

General information
- Location: Chalk Farm
- Local authority: London Borough of Camden
- Managed by: London Underground
- Number of platforms: 2
- Fare zone: 2

London Underground annual entry and exit
- 2021: ▲2.20 million
- 2022: ▲4.00 million
- 2023: ▲4.53 million
- 2024: ▲4.74 million
- 2025: ▼4.68 million

Railway companies
- Original company: Charing Cross, Euston and Hampstead Railway

Key dates
- 22 June 1907: Station opened

Listed status
- Listing grade: II
- Entry number: 1401028
- Added to list: 20 July 2011; 15 years ago

Other information
- External links: TfL station info page
- Coordinates: 51°32′39″N 0°09′12″W

Chalk Farm is a London Underground station near Camden Town in the London Borough of Camden. It is on the Edgware branch of the Northern line, between Belsize Park and Camden Town stations. For ticketing purposes, the station falls in London fare zone 2. With slightly under five million entries and exits in 2011, Chalk Farm is one of the busiest stations on the Edgware branch of the Northern line.

== History ==
The northbound platform

The station was opened on 22 June 1907 by the Charing Cross, Euston & Hampstead Railway (CCE&HR). Trains originally operated between Golders Green and Charing Cross, with extensions to Edgware and Kennington in 1923–24 and 1926, respectively. All trains ran via the Charing Cross branch. As part of a comprehensive signing scheme, the 'UndergrounD' lettering was added in 1908.

With the subsequent extension of the City and South London Railway (C&SLR) to Camden Town in 1924, the CCE&HR and C&SLR were joined, allowing through running on the Bank branch and service as far south as Clapham Common, extending to Morden in 1926.

== Station layout ==
Chalk Farm station lies at the intersection of Haverstock Hill (the northern extension of Chalk Farm Road) and Adelaide Road, which create an angular intersection that forms the centre of the neighbourhood of the same name.

=== Architecture ===
Chalk Farm's narrow, wedge-shaped station building gives it the longest frontage of any of the stations designed by architect Leslie Green for the three tube lines owned by the Underground Electric Railways Company of London and opened in 1906 and 1907. It also has the shallowest lift shafts of any Underground station (21 ft). Station refurbishment by Tube Lines was completed in 2005. The station is a Grade II listed building.

== Connections ==
London Buses routes 1, 31, 393 and night routes N5, N28 and N31 serve the station.

== In popular culture ==
The station appears on the front cover of the 1980 album, Absolutely by Madness. Scenes from the 1988 film, Just Ask for Diamond, were filmed above the station.

Preceding station	London Underground	Following station
Belsize Park towards Edgware	Northern line Edgware branch	Camden Town towards Battersea Power Station, Morden or Kennington
