= Laburnum (disambiguation) =

Laburnum may refer to:

== Places ==
- Laburnum, Victoria, an area of Melbourne, Australia
  - Laburnum railway station
- Laburnum Avenue, in Richmond, Virginia, United States

Laburnum Avenue in Flushing, New York, United States

== Plants ==
- Broom laburnum (+ Laburnocytisus 'Adamii'), a graft-chimaera
- Dalmatian laburnum (Petteria ramentacea)
- Indian laburnum (Cassia fistula)
- Laburnum, a toxic, yellow-flowered Southern European pea tree genus in Fabaceae family

== Ships ==
- HMMS Laburnum, a minelayer of the Royal Malaysian Navy
- HMS Laburnum (1915), a sloop of the Royal Navy
- USS Laburnum (1864), a steamer of the United States Navy
