= Haverstock Hill =

Haverstock Hill is a street in the London Borough of Camden.

The origin of the name is unclear, despite being one of the earliest recorded in the area.

In 1871, Haverstock Hill was described as a suburb of London divided between the parishes of Hampstead and St Pancras, taking in the churches of Holy Trinity Haverstock Hill, St Peters Belsize Square and St Saviour Hampstead.
