= Chalk Farm =

Urban district of London, England

Coordinates: 51.544°N 0.152°W

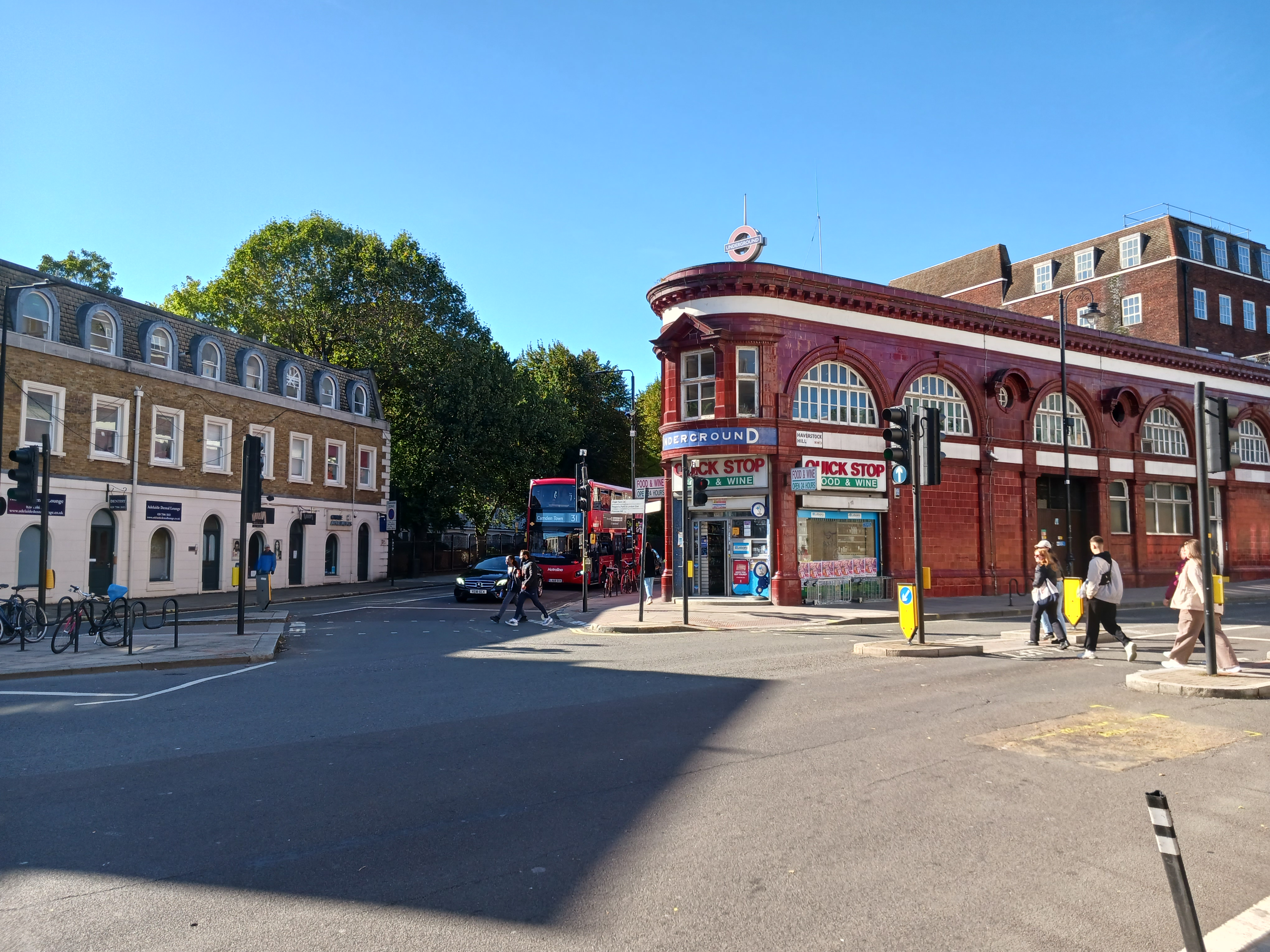
- Chalk Farm Underground station at the junction of Adelaide Road and Haverstock Hill

- Location within Greater London
- Population: 24,977 Based on maximal two-ward definition based on 2011 census
- OS grid reference: TQ2884
- London borough: Camden
- Ceremonial county: Greater London
- Region: London
- Country: England
- Sovereign state: United Kingdom
- Post town: LONDON
- Postcode district: NW1, NW3, NW5
- Dialling code: 020
- Police: Metropolitan
- Fire: London
- Ambulance: London
- UK Parliament: Holborn and St Pancras
- London Assembly: Barnet and Camden

Chalk Farm is an urban district lying immediately north of Camden Town, in the London Borough of Camden.

== History ==
=== Manor of Rugmere ===
Chalk Farm was originally known as the Manor of Rugmere, an estate that was mentioned in the Domesday Book of 1086. The manor was one of five which made up the large Ancient Parish of St Pancras. Rugmere is thought to mean the Woodcock's Pool.

Henry VIII bought part of the manor, detaching it to form the north-eastern part of what would become Regent's Park, the remainder subsequently become more commonly known as Chalk Farm. Both the detached area and the remainder remained part of the parish of St Pancras.

In 1786 the estate was sold to Charles FitzRoy, 1st Baron Southampton, it was described as commonly known as Chalk Farm. The term Rugmere (or Rug Moor) appeared to have endured for some time as a field name.

=== Etymology ===
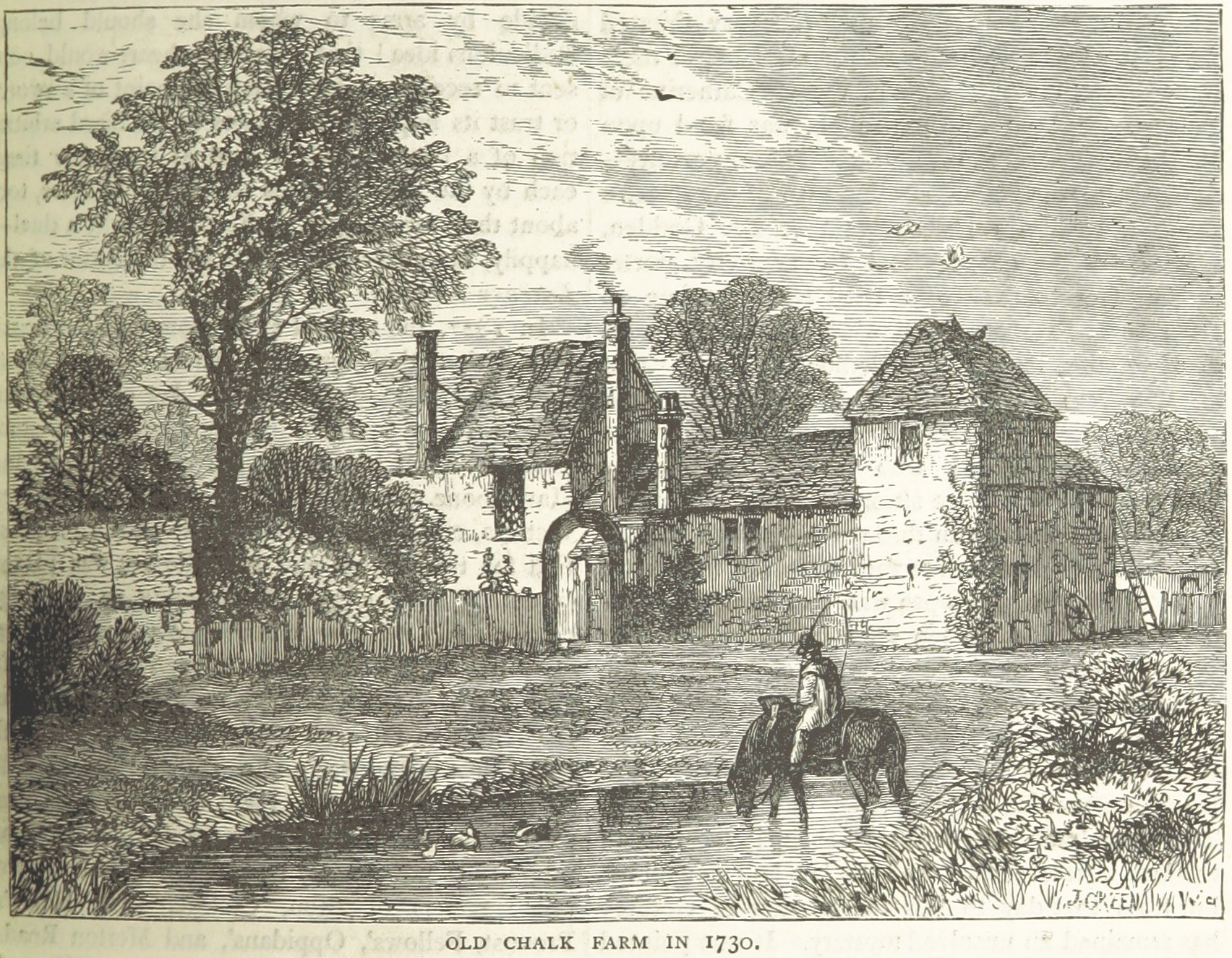
Old Chalk Farm in 1870

The origin of the name is disputed: it certainly does not derive from the soil, as the area is built on London Clay. The consensus view is that "Chalk Farm" derives from Middle English Chaldecote or Caldecote, a common English toponym meaning "cold cottage" first attested in the area of Chalk Farm in 1256. This had become Chalcotts by the 16th century, and Chalk by 1746. The full form "Chalk Farm" is a 19th-century coinage, though "Chalcott" remained in use in the early 19th century for a nearby estate, formerly the Upper and Lower Chalcot Farms.

The Chalcott estate was farmed from England's Lane in Belsize Park, in the parish of Hampstead, half a mile to the north-west (first recorded as Chaldecotes in the 13th century). The estate had split into Upper and Lower Chalcot Farms by 1720, but reunited and farmed from Upper Chalcot Farmhouse around 1797. The counter argument is that Lower Chalcot Farm was not Chalk Farm as often claimed, but actually farmed from another farmhouse on England's Lane. If that argument is correct then Chalk Farm was never known as Chalcot, but probably named for the whitewashed farm buildings. Chalk has often been used as a product in whitewash. The farmhouse at Lower Chalcot was sometimes referred to as the White House.

== Geography ==
The area is not formally defined, though the former Manor of Chalk Farm was a component part of the Ancient Parish and Borough of St Pancras. The core area lies between Chalk Farm Road in the east and St Pancras' western boundary to the west; an area that extends to Ainger Road and takes in part of the Primrose Hill open space, though the hill itself is in Hampstead. Modern conventions, however, take the railway line as the western border of Chalk Farm, with the area on the other side of the line being seen as part of Primrose Hill neighbourhood.

Chalk Farm includes part of the Camden Town with Primrose Hill ward, and perhaps also part of the Haverstock ward. As of 2020, Camden's wards are being reviewed and these wards will be abolished or have their boundaries redrawn.

=== Neighbouring places ===
- Primrose Hill
- Camden Town
- Regent's Park
- Kentish Town
- Maitland Park
- St John's Wood
- Swiss Cottage

== Culture and nightlife ==
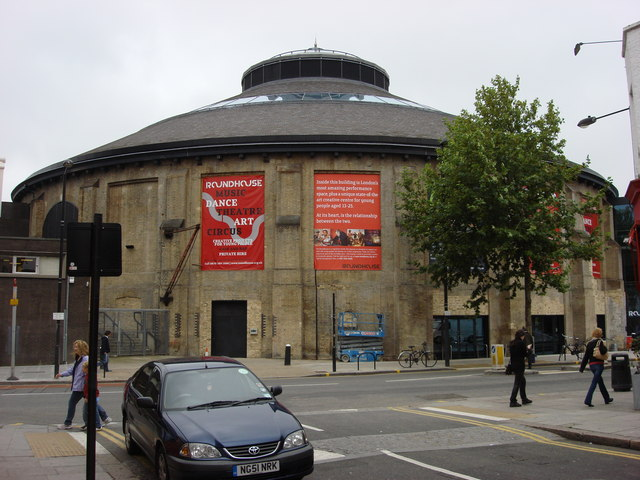
The Roundhouse, Chalk Farm

Chalk Farm is well known for the Roundhouse arts and concert venue on Chalk Farm Road.

== Social conditions ==
The south of the area has regular residents on its broadest definition, which is capable of including Jude Law, Sadie Frost and Sienna Miller among the highest-grossing early 21st century 'Camden set' of writers, artists and actors, but equally, parts of both wards have some stubborn poverty and a significant minority of their housing is social housing.

Census data for local wards gives an indication of varied social conditions in the area.

2011 Published Statistics: Population, home ownership and extracts from Physical Environment, surveyed in 2005
Output area	Homes owned outright	Owned with a loan	Socially rented	Privately rented	Other	km^{2} green spaces	km^{2} roads	km^{2} water	km^{2} domestic gardens	km^{2} domestic buildings	km^{2} non-domestic buildings	Usual residents	km^{2}
Haverstock	677	727	2,583	1,156	111	0.10	0.01	0.00	0.15	0.10	0.08	12,364	0.73
Camden Town with Primrose Hill	1,122	882	1,802	1,974	125	0.16	0.02	0.02	0.18	0.15	0.17	12,613	1.17

== Transport ==
Chalk Farm on the north–south Northern line, Edgware branch. The nearest London Overground station (east–west) is centred 0.5 miles (0.80 km) east: Kentish Town West.
