= Hampstead Theatre =

Theatre in London, England

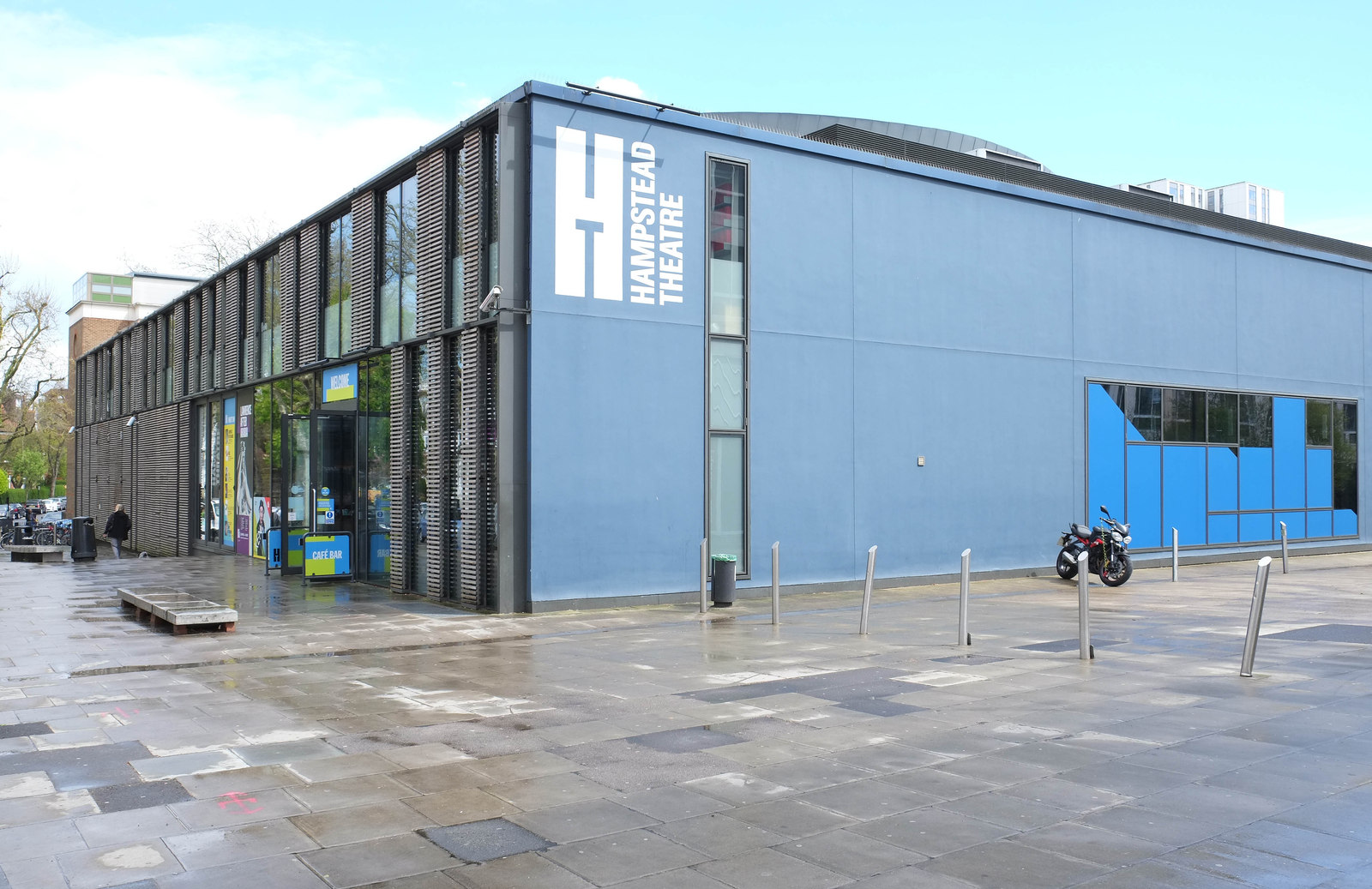
- Hampstead Theatre in April 2016
- Interactive map of Hampstead Theatre
- Address: Eton Avenue; London, England
- Coordinates: 51.543333°N 0.174167°W
- Owner: Hampstead Theatre Company
- Capacity: Main House; Configuration: End On 374; Thrust 370; Traverse 383; Hampstead Downstairs: 90
- Type: Flexible stage and seating
- Designation: RIBA Award 2003
- Public transit: Swiss Cottage; South Hampstead; Finchley Road & Frognal

Construction
- Opened: 2003
- Years active: Since 1959; 67 years ago (various locations)
- Architect: Bennetts Associates

Website
- www.hampsteadtheatre.com

Hampstead Theatre is a theatre in South Hampstead, in the London Borough of Camden. It specialises in commissioning and producing new writing, supporting and developing the work of new writers.

== History ==
The original Hampstead Theatre Club was formed in 1959, in Moreland Hall, a parish church school hall in Holly Bush Vale, Hampstead. James Roose-Evans was the founder and first Artistic Director, and the 1959–1960 season included The Dumb Waiter and The Room by Harold Pinter, Eugène Ionesco's Jacques and The Sport of My Mad Mother by Ann Jellicoe.

In 1962, the company moved to a "temporary" prefabricated building with an audience capacity of 157 (Note: Stephen Joseph quoted a figure of 90 in 1968.) on land now occupied by Swiss Cottage Library and adjoining leisure centre. It remained there until 2003, when the purpose-built Hampstead Theatre became the first completely new theatre to open in London since the National Theatre in 1975. The main auditorium seats 373 people. The studio theatre, Hampstead Downstairs, seats up to 100 people and was turned into a laboratory for new writing in 2010.

In 2022, Arts Council England removed the theatre's public funding.

== Artistic directors ==
- James Roose-Evans (1959–1971)
- Vivian Matalon (1971–1973)
- Michael Rudman (1973–1978)
- David Aukin (1978–1984)
- Michael Attenborough (1984–1988)
- Jenny Topper (1988–2003)
- Anthony Clark (2003–2010)
- Edward Hall (2010–2019)
- Roxana Silbert (2019–2022)

== Playwrights ==
Playwrights who have had their early work produced at the theatre include:

- Mike Bartlett
- Alistair Beaton
- Simon Block
- Al Blyth
- Jeremy Brock
- Michael Frayn
- Brian Friel
- Rebecca Gilman
- Daniel Hill
- Terry Johnson
- Dennis Kelly
- Hanif Kureishi
- Mike Leigh
- Abi Morgan
- Tom Morton-Smith
- Rona Munro
- Harold Pinter
- Bernard Pomerance
- Nina Raine
- Philip Ridley
- Saman Shad
- Martin Sherman
- Shelagh Stephenson
- Hugh Whitemore
- Crispin Whittell
- Roy Williams
