= Priory Road =

Street in Kilburn, London

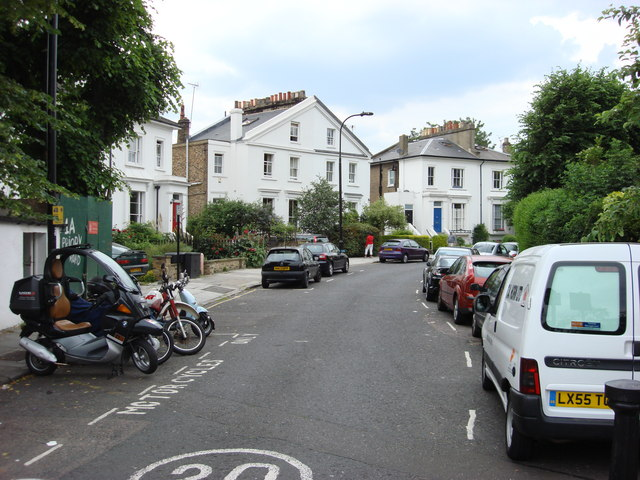
Houses at the southern end of Priory Road.

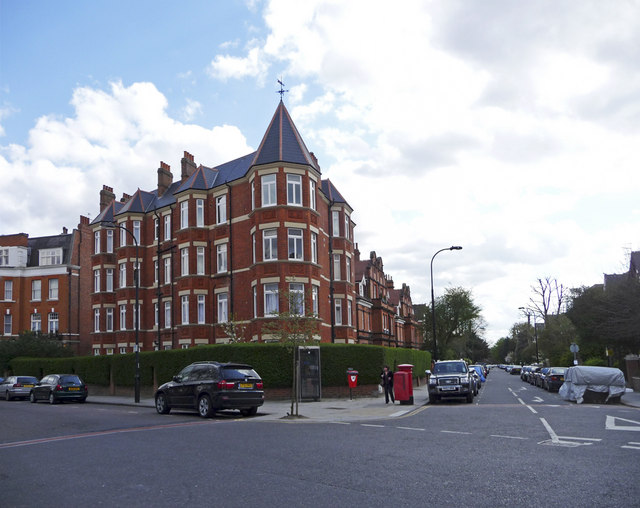
Redbrick apartment block at the junction of Priory Road with Broadstone Gardens.

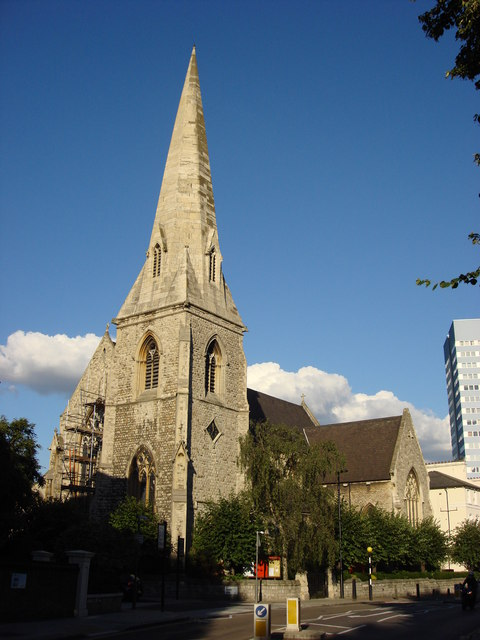
St Mary's Church, Kilburn.

Priory Road is a street in Kilburn. Located in the London Borough of Camden it runs northwards from Belsize Road through South Hampstead crossing several streets including Abbey Road before finishing at a junction with Broadhurst Gardens, not far from West Hampstead tube station. It takes its name from the old Kilburn Priory located in the area until the dissolution of the monasteries under Henry VIII.

The street marked the boundary between two separate estates that were redeveloped from the mid-Victorian era and was jointly constructed between them. It followed a very old track linking the priory with Hampstead. Originally known as Canfield Road, the name was changed in 1880 to reflect the area's connection with the former priory. The Anglican St Mary's Church was built between 1857 and 1862 at the junction with Abbey Road and is now Grade II listed. Part of the street was built over the ground of Hampstead Cricket Club who were forced to relocate in 1876. From 1895 to 1901 Kilburn Library, the Borough of Hampstead's first public library, was based in the street. The southern stretch of the street features a large number of white stucco houses and is part of a Conservation area along with nearby Priory Terrace. During the nineteenth century, the road continuing south beyond Belsize Road was considered an extension of Priory Road, but is now named Kilburn Priory.

== Priory Terrace ==
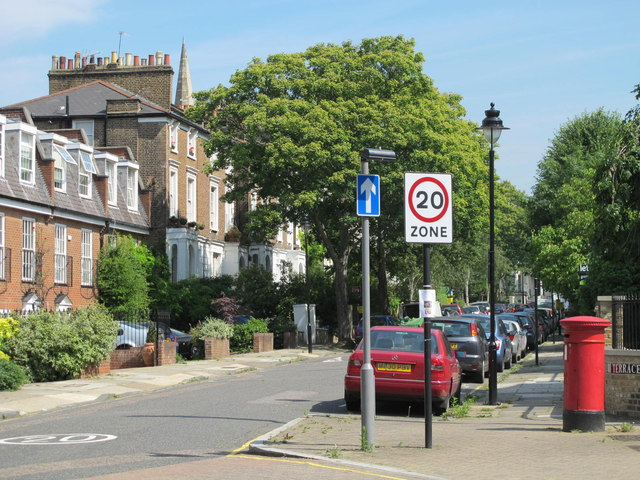
Priory Terrace from Belsize Road.

Priory Terrace runs parallel to the east of the southern stretch of Priory Road connecting Belsize Road and Abbey Road. It was laid out in around 1850, It was originally known as St George's Road before being renamed by the London County Council in 1937. Notable residents have included the bibliophile and forger Thomas James Wise, the composer Bernard van Dieren and the artist Bernard Meninsky while actor Dirk Bogarde was born there in 1921.

== Bibliography ==
- Bebbington, Gillian. London Street Names. Batsford, 1972.
- Cherry, Bridget & Pevsner, Nikolaus. London 4: North. Yale University Press, 2002.
- Thompson, Francis Michael Longstreth. Hampstead; Building a Borough, 1650–1964. Routledge & Kegan Paul, 1974.
- Wade, Christopher (ed.) The Streets of West Hampstead. Camden History Society, 1992.
