= Belsize Road =

Street in London

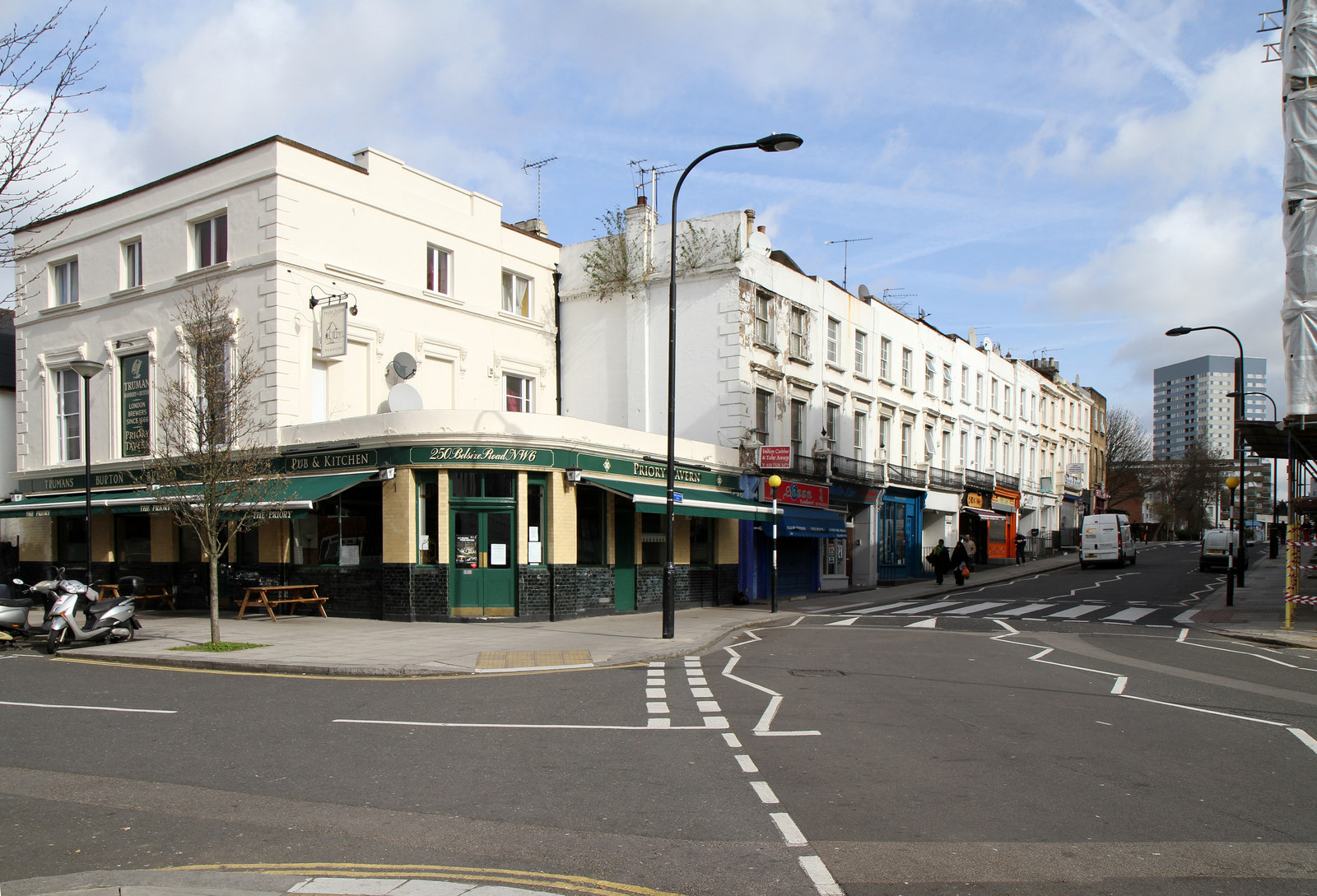
The Kilburn end of the street with the Priory Tavern.

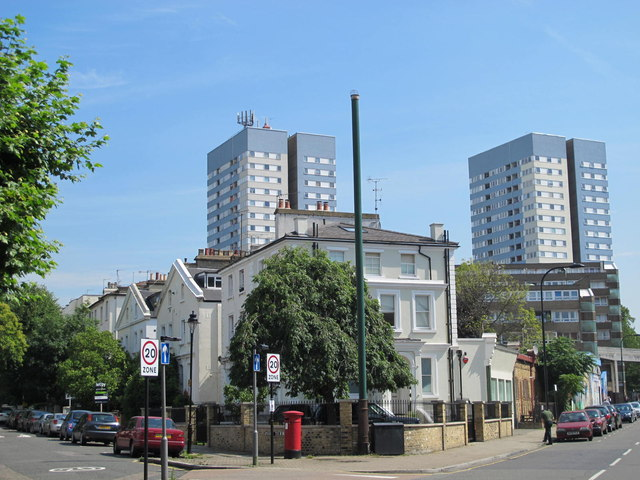
The junction with Priory Terrace.

Belsize Road is a street in the London Borough of Camden. It runs west to east from Kilburn High Road to close to Finchley Road in the Swiss Cottage area of Hampstead. It is part of the B509 route which continues eastwards as Adelaide Road to Chalk Farm tube station. Despite its name it is located to the west of Belsize Park in the South Hampstead area. Much of its route runs parallel to the Midland Main Line and Kilburn High Road station is at its eastern end. It meets a number of streets including Loudoun Road, Abbey Road and Priory Road.

It was the route from Kilburn to the old Belsize House estate, hence its name, although a stretch of it was initially called Adelaide Road North. Laid out in the mid-Victorian era many of the early buildings were designed by Robert Yeo, an assistant of Samuel Cuming. Kilburn Priory was located at what is now the junction between Belsize Road and Kilburn High Street. The western stretch of Belsize Road is the oldest and was marked on a map of 1702 and formed the approach road to the Priory estate. The old Priory was closed down during the Tudor Dissolution of the monasteries but the name is still commemorated in the Victorian-built Priory Tavern and the nearby Priory Road. Later Kilburn Wells, a well-known spa, was located in the area during the eighteenth century.

== Bibliography ==
- Bebbington, Gillian. London Street Names. Batsford, 1972.
- Cherry, Bridget & Pevsner, Nikolaus. London 4: North. Yale University Press, 2002.
- Thompson, Francis Michael Longstreth. Hampstead; Building a Borough, 1650–1964. Routledge & Kegan Paul, 1974.
- Wade, Christopher (ed.) The Streets of West Hampstead. Camden History Society, 1992.
