= Loudoun Road =

Street in St John's Wood, London

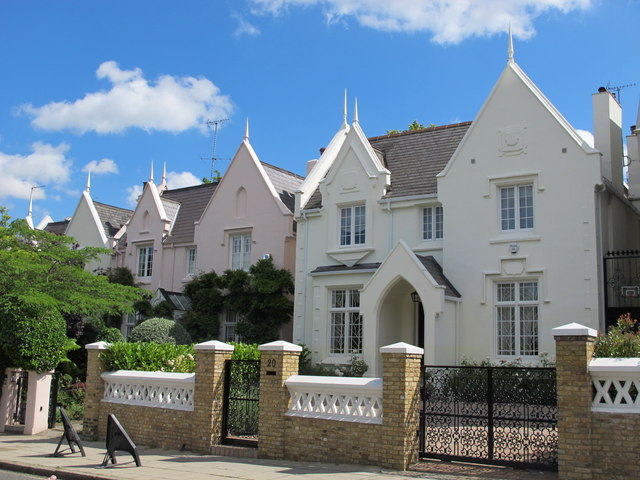
Victorian era houses in the street.

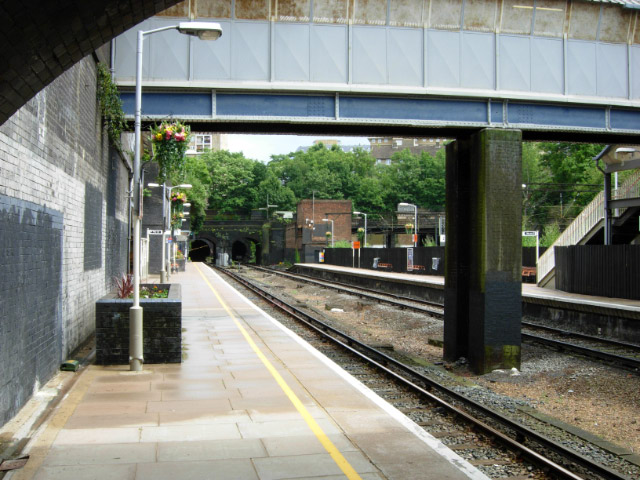
South Hampstead station was known as Loudoun Road until 1922.

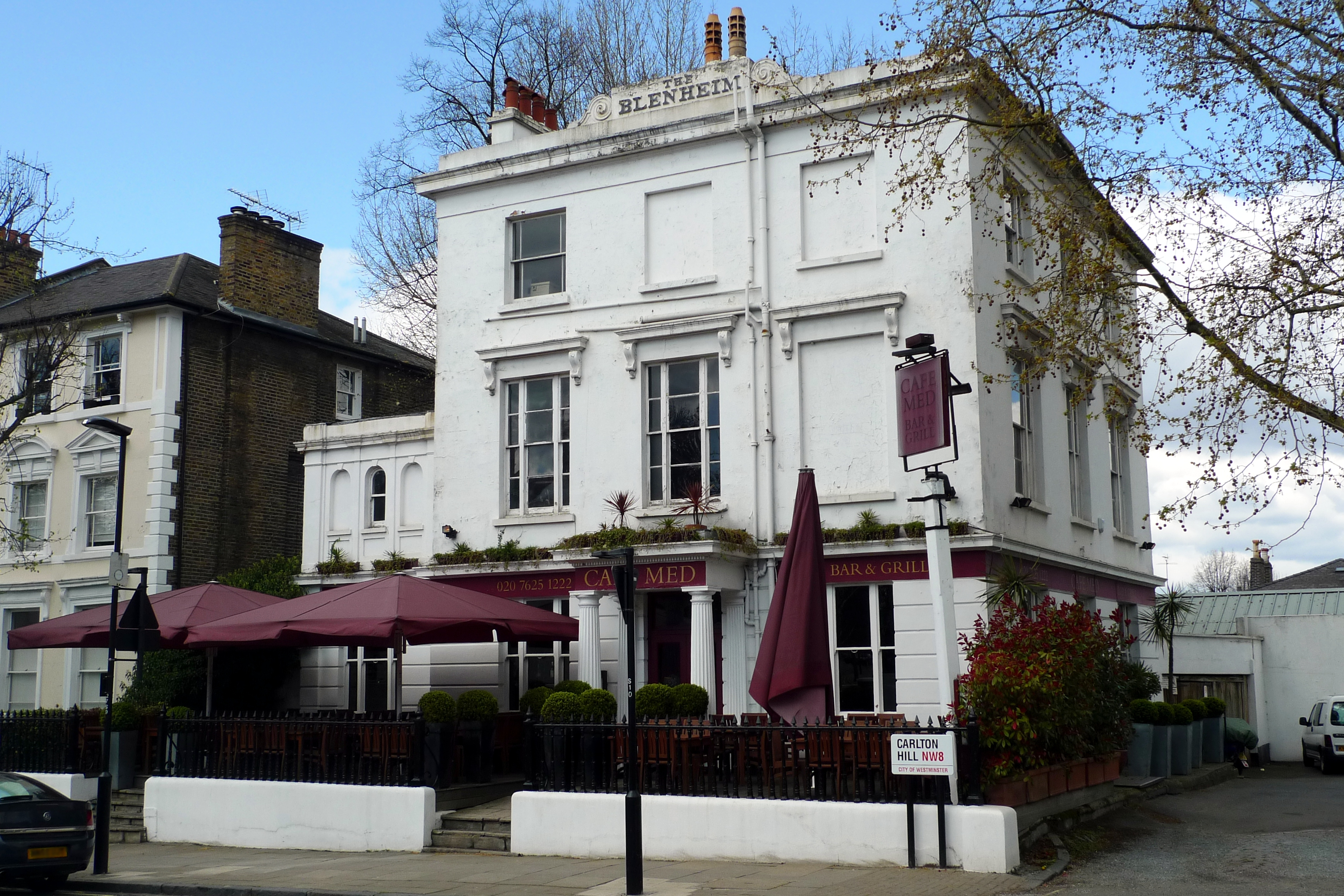
The former Blenheim Arms pub on the junction with Carlton Hill.

Loudoun Road is a street in the St John's Wood area of London. Most of its route is in the City of Westminster, but it crosses into the London Borough of Camden at its northern end in South Hampstead. It runs roughly parallel to Finchley Road to its east while Abbey Road, London is to the west. It runs north from Grove End Road, not far from St John's Wood tube station, and crosses or is joined by a number of streets including Marlborough Place, Carlton Hill and Boundary Road. It finishes at a roundabout junction with several streets including Belsize Road and Fairhazel Gardens. South Hampstead railway station is at the northern end of the street.

The road was laid out in the 1840s and 1850s, and takes its name from the Scottish landscape gardener John Claudius Loudon. Initially only the southern section was named Loudon Street with the northern stretch known as Bridge Road after the road bridge carrying it across West Coast Main Line. By 1878 the whole street was known by the name and when a new railway station opened that year it was named after the street. Located at the entrance to the lengthy Primrose Hill Tunnel, it was known as Loudoun Road until its renaming as South Hampstead station in 1922.

The street is primarily residential featuring a variety of architectural styles, including a number of the original buildings. The former Anglican Church of All Souls was built in 1864 and is now Grade II listed. A number of other buildings are listed. In the 1970s the Alexandra Road Estate was constructed on the western side of Loudoun Road and is now Grade II* listed.

== Bibliography ==
- Bailey, Justin. Today's London Overground: A Pictorial Overview. Pen and Sword Transport, 2021.
- Bebbington, Gillian. London Street Names. Batsford, 1972.
- Cherry, Bridget & Pevsner, Nikolaus. London 4: North. Yale University Press, 2002.
- Thompson, Francis Michael Longstreth. Hampstead; Building a Borough, 1650-1964. Routledge & Kegan Paul, 1974.
- Wade, Christopher (ed.) The Streets of West Hampstead. Camden History Society, 1992.
