= Kilburn Library =

Public library in London, England

Coordinates: 51.5363°N 0.1913°W

Kilburn Library (Camden)
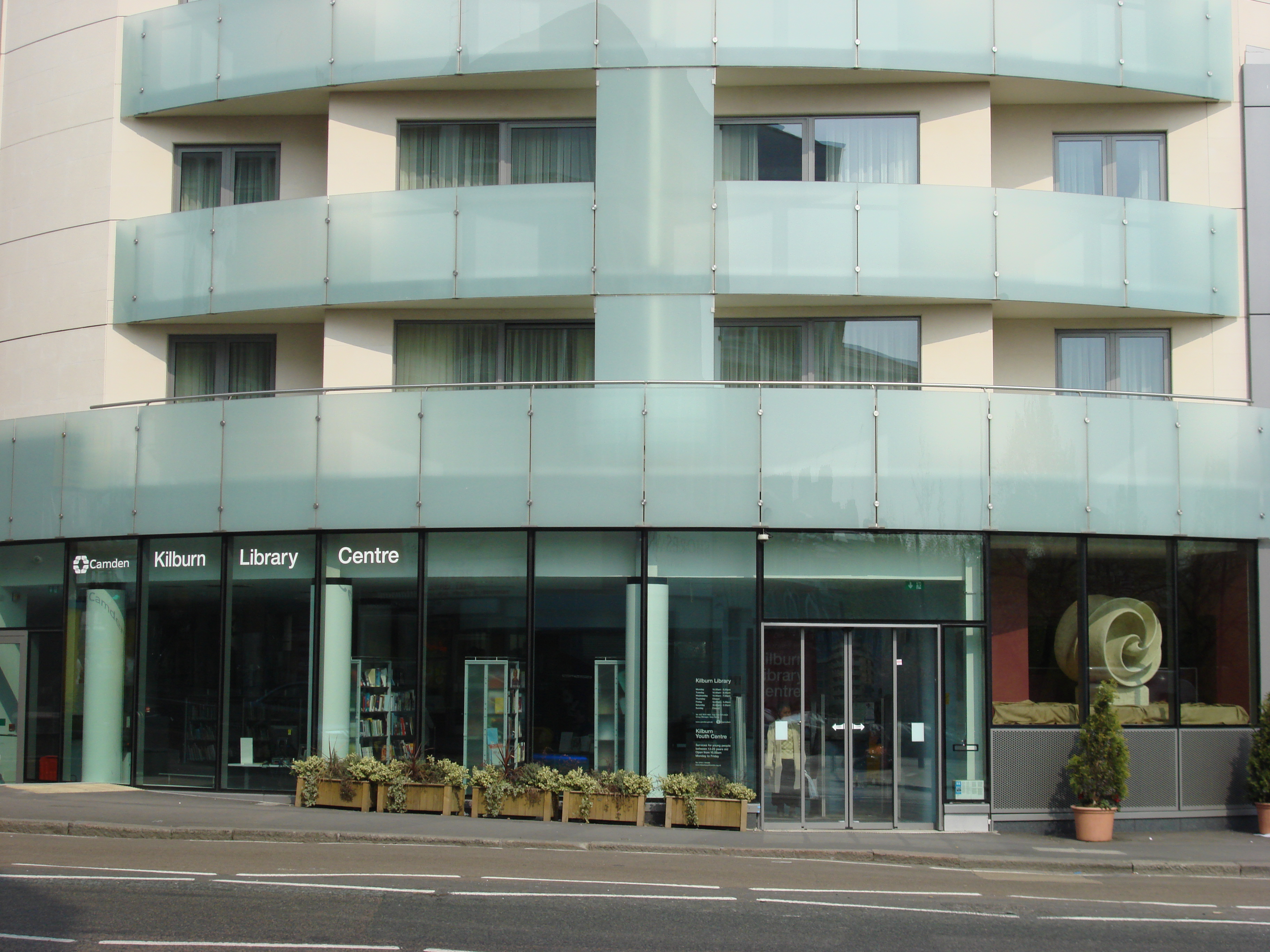
- The library on Kilburn High Road
- Location: Kilburn High Road, NW6, London Borough of Camden, North London
- Established: October 1894 (first location) / 1902 (current location)
- Closed: 31 December 1901 (first location)

There are two library buildings in North London called Kilburn Library. One is in the London Borough of Camden and located in the Kilburn High Road, NW6, and the other is in the London Borough of Brent and located in Salusbury Road. NW6.

Camden's Kilburn Library was first located in Priory Road, NW6, as a temporary arrangement. It operated from October 1894 until 31 December 1901. In 1902 it relocated to Cotleigh Road, NW6, and remained there for a little over a hundred years. Its current layout comprises mezzanine with children's, family and learning facilities, quiet reading lounge, computers with free internet and wifi, book, CD and DVD lending making it an essential library service and gateway to other Council services to the local community. It is also home to the Kilburn Youth Centre.
