= Kilburn Priory =

Historic monastic community Northwest of London

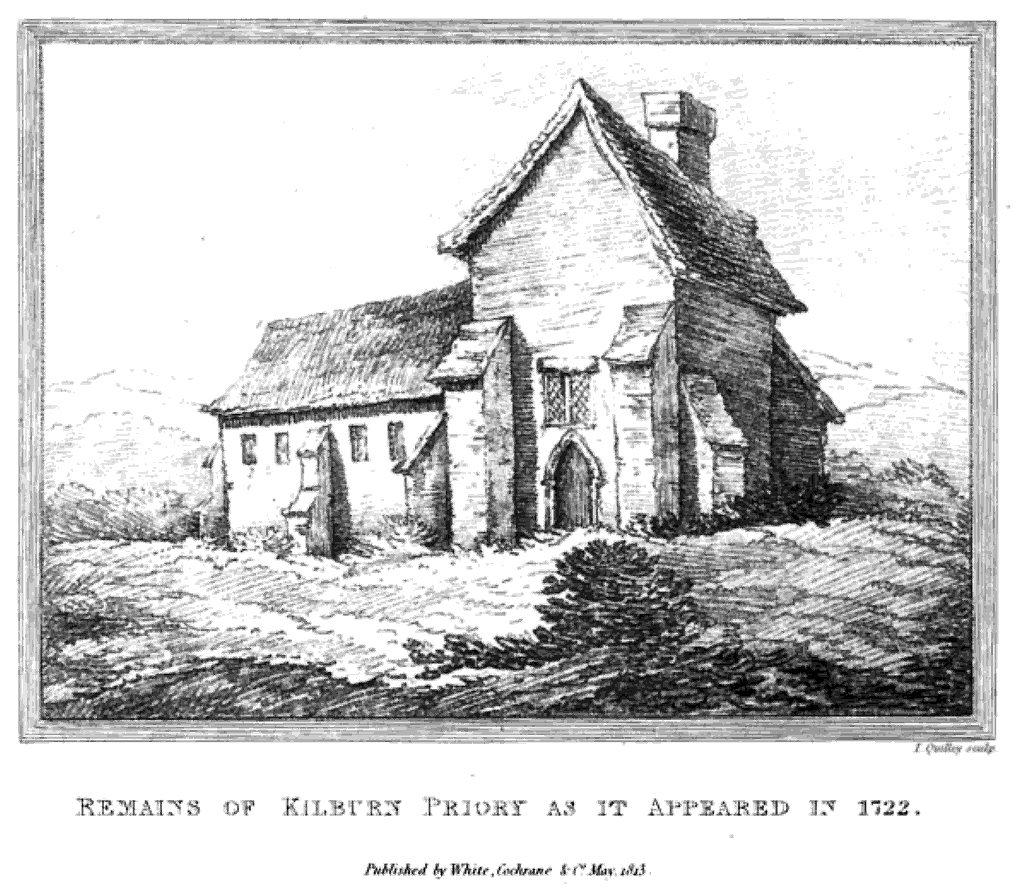
- Kilburn Priory as it appeared in 1722

- Location within London Borough of Camden
- Interactive map of Kilburn Priory

Monastery information
- Full name: Primo fundatio monialium de Kylborne per abbatem Westmonasterii Herebertum
- Order: Augustinian
- Established: 1130–1134
- Disestablished: 1537
- Mother house: St Peter at Westminster
- Dedication: St. John the Baptist

Site
- Location: Kilburn, Middlesex, England
- Coordinates: 51.541°N 0.1896°W

Kilburn Priory was a small monastic community of nuns established around 1130–1134 three miles north-west of the City of London, where Watling Street (now Kilburn High Road) met the stream now known as the Westbourne, but variously known as Cuneburna, Keneburna, Keeleburne, Coldburne, or Caleburn, meaning either the royal or cow's stream. The priory gave its name to the area now known as Kilburn, and the local streets Priory Road, Kilburn Priory, Priory Terrace, and Abbey Road. Kilburn Lane connected the priory to the village of Kensal to the west.

The site was used until 1130 as a hermitage by Godwyn, a recluse, who subsequently gave the property to the conventual church of St. Peter, Westminster. The priory was established with the consent of Gilbert Universalis, bishop of London, before his death in August 1134. Though it was originally subordinate to Westminster Abbey, whose monks followed the Benedictine rule, by 1377 it was described as being an order of Augustinian canonesses. It was once believed that the Ancrene Riwle was written for the first three nuns of Kilburn, but this is now thought unlikely.

Agnes Strickland states that the priory was established in 1128 for the three pious and charitable ladies-in-waiting of Queen Matilda of Scotland, consort of Henry I, named Emma, Gunilda, and Cristina.

After the death of the queen [in 1118] these ladies retired to the hermitage of Kilburn near London, where there was a holy well, or medicinal spring. This was changed to a priory in 1128, as the deed says, for the reception of these . . . damsels who had belonged to the chamber of Matilda.

Kilburn Priory was dissolved by Henry VIII in 1537 and its site in Kilburn was given to the Knights of St. John in exchange for other property, and then seized back by the crown in 1540.
