= Abbey Road, London =

Road in London

Abbey Road
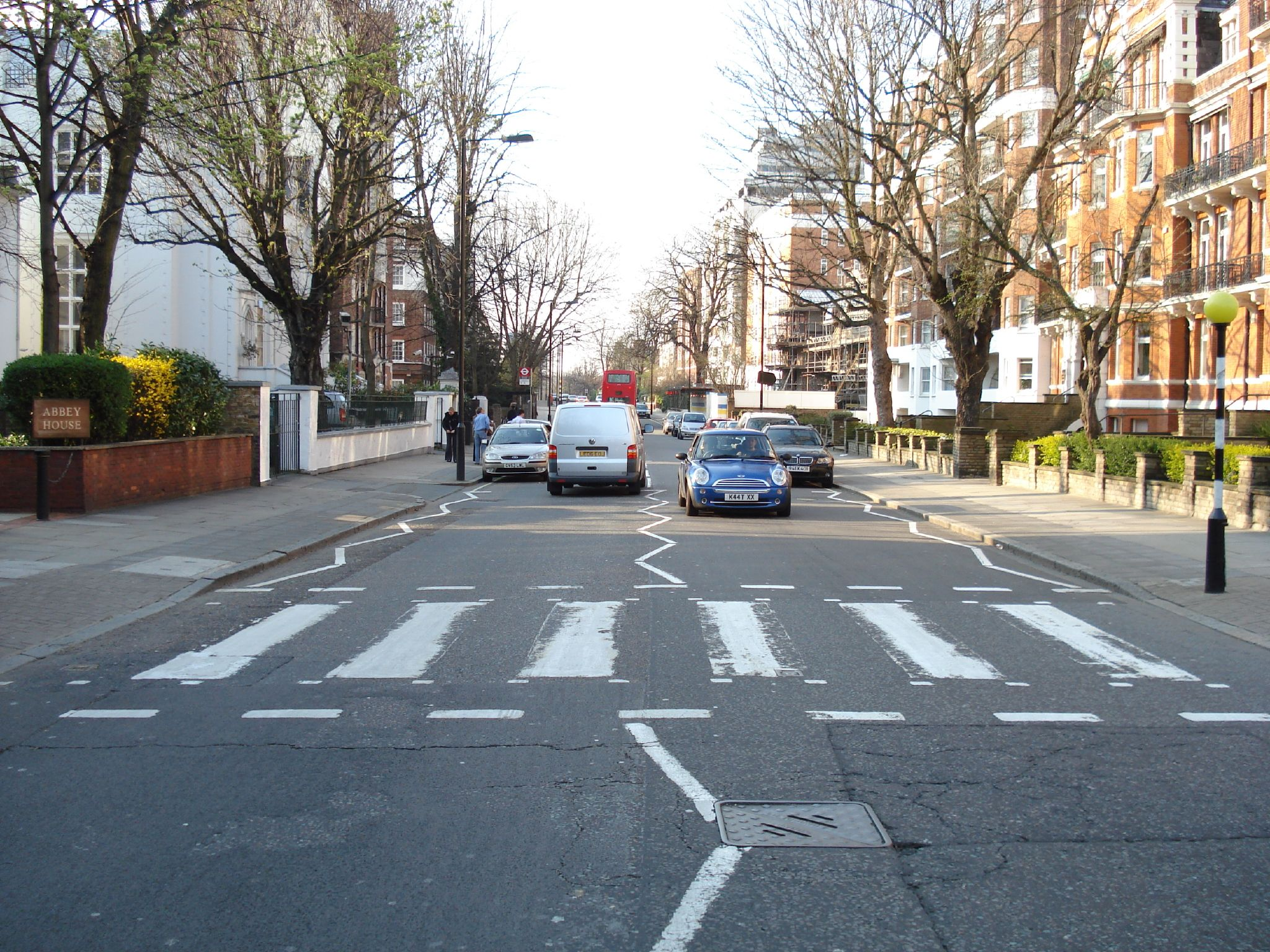
- The crossing in the spring of 2007
- Abbey Road highlighted in red
- Length: 0.9 mi (1.4 km)
- Location: St John's Wood, Greater London
- Postal code: NW8
- Nearest Tube station: St John's Wood
- Coordinates: 51°31′55.4″N 0°10′38.4″W
- South end: Quex Road, Kilburn
- East end: Grove End Road; St John's Wood

Other
- Known for: Abbey Road Studios; The Beatles' album cover

Abbey Road is a thoroughfare in the borough of Camden and the City of Westminster in Greater London running roughly northwest to southeast through St John's Wood near Lord's Cricket Ground. It is part of the road B507. The road is best known for the Abbey Road Studios and for featuring on the cover of the Beatles' album of the same name, which was released in September 1969.

== Location ==
The northwestern end of Abbey Road begins in Kilburn at the junction with Quex Road and West End Lane. The road was once a track leading to Kilburn Priory and its associated Abbey Farm and was developed in the beginning of the nineteenth century. It continues southeast for roughly one mile crossing Priory Road, Belsize Road, Boundary Road (which forms the Camden/Westminster boundary), Clifton Hill, Carlton Hill and Marlborough Place, ending at the junction of Grove End Road and Garden Road. It is joined from the west by Abercorn Place.

== History ==
The Abbey National Building Society (now Santander UK) was founded in 1874 as The Abbey Road & St John's Wood Permanent Benefit Building Society in one Baptist Church on Abbey Road.

EMI's Abbey Road Studios is located at the southeastern end at 3 Abbey Road, St John's Wood. The Beatles, Kanye West, Glenn Miller, Queen, Radiohead, Lady Gaga, Shirley Bassey, Aretha Franklin, ABBA, Cliff Richard, Kate Bush, Brockhampton, Kylie Minogue, Pink Floyd, and many other famous popular music performers have recorded at this studio. The Beatles named their last studio LP after this street, and the album's cover photograph shows the four group members walking across the zebra crossing just outside the studio entrance.

As a result of its association with the Beatles, this part of Abbey Road has been featured on the London tourism circuit. The crossing was given the official status of Grade II listed building by English Heritage in December 2010. The zebra crossing featured on the Beatles cover has become a popular photo opportunity area, despite the road still being a busy thoroughfare for traffic.

The crossing may have been relocated several metres as part of traffic management work in the 1970s, with a spokesperson for Westminster City Council saying in 2010 that "by comparing photographs with the Ordnance Survey maps, we believe that the crossing might have been further north nearer 3 Abbey Road, which was the front house of the EMI Studios, because the steps of Neville Court appear to the right of the crossing in original photographs of the crossing, whereas the present crossing is near the junction of Abbey Road and Grove End Road".

The Beatles' album cover has been parodied many times over the years. The street sign on the corner of Grove End Road and Abbey Road, which was frequently defaced or stolen, is now mounted high on the building on the corner to save the local council the expense of cleaning and replacing it. The council repaints the wall next to the zebra crossing every three months to cover fans' graffiti. In 2019, Thames Water installed a commemorative manhole cover at the site of the crossing to mark the album's 50th anniversary.

Abbey Road is also an electoral ward in the City of Westminster. At the 2011 census, it had a population of 11,250.

== Gallery ==
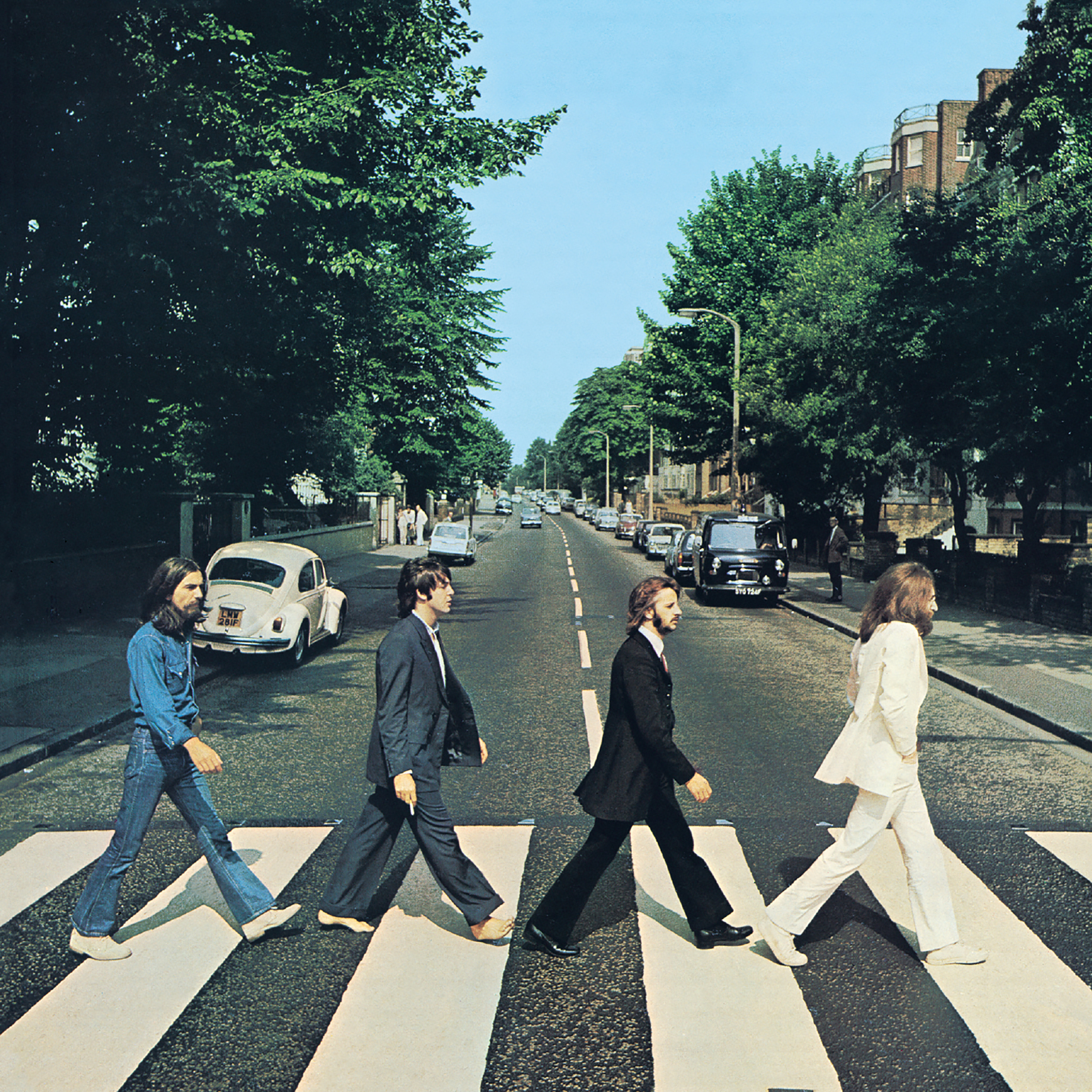
The cover of Abbey Road by The Beatles, showing the band walking across the street in 1969.

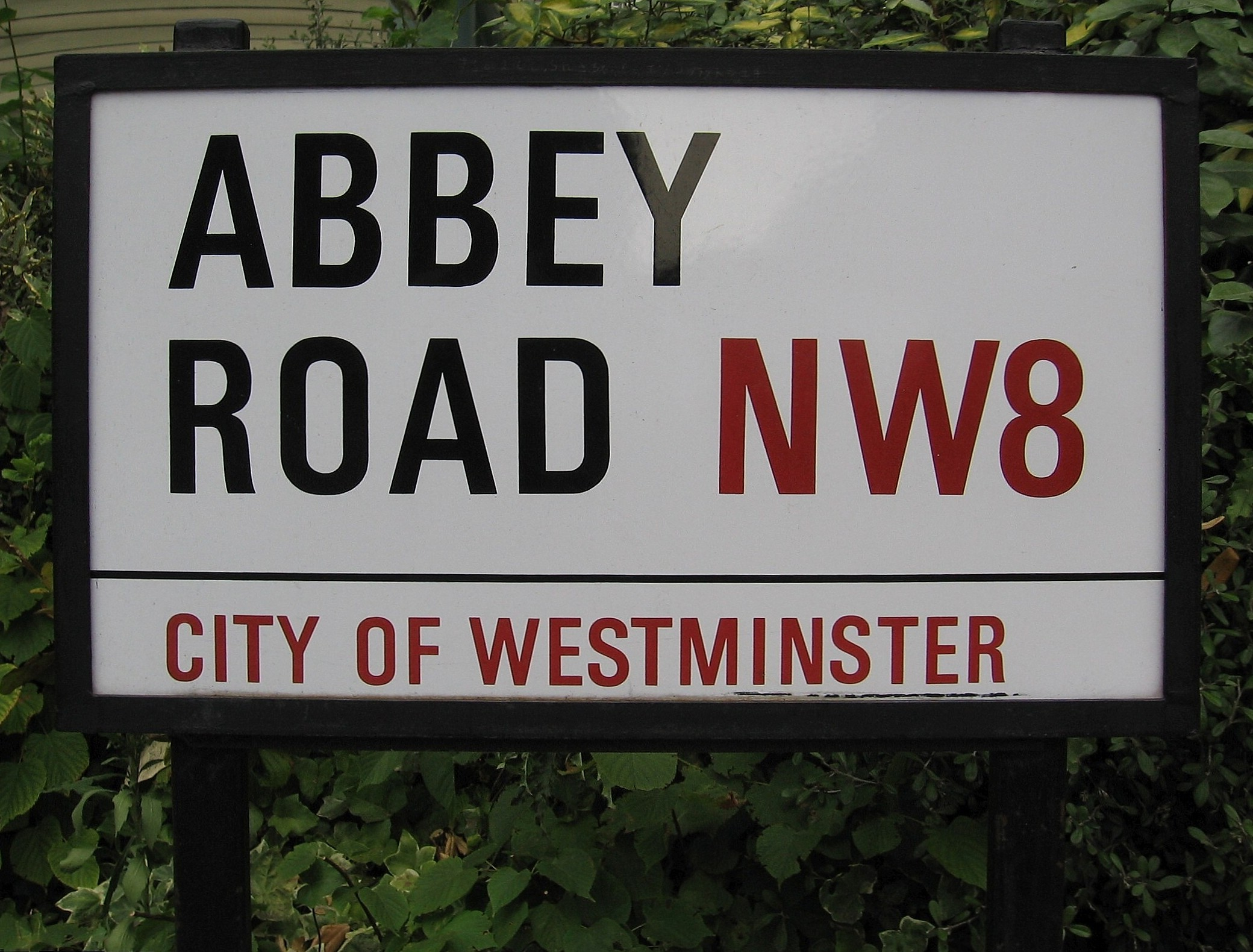
Abbey Road street sign

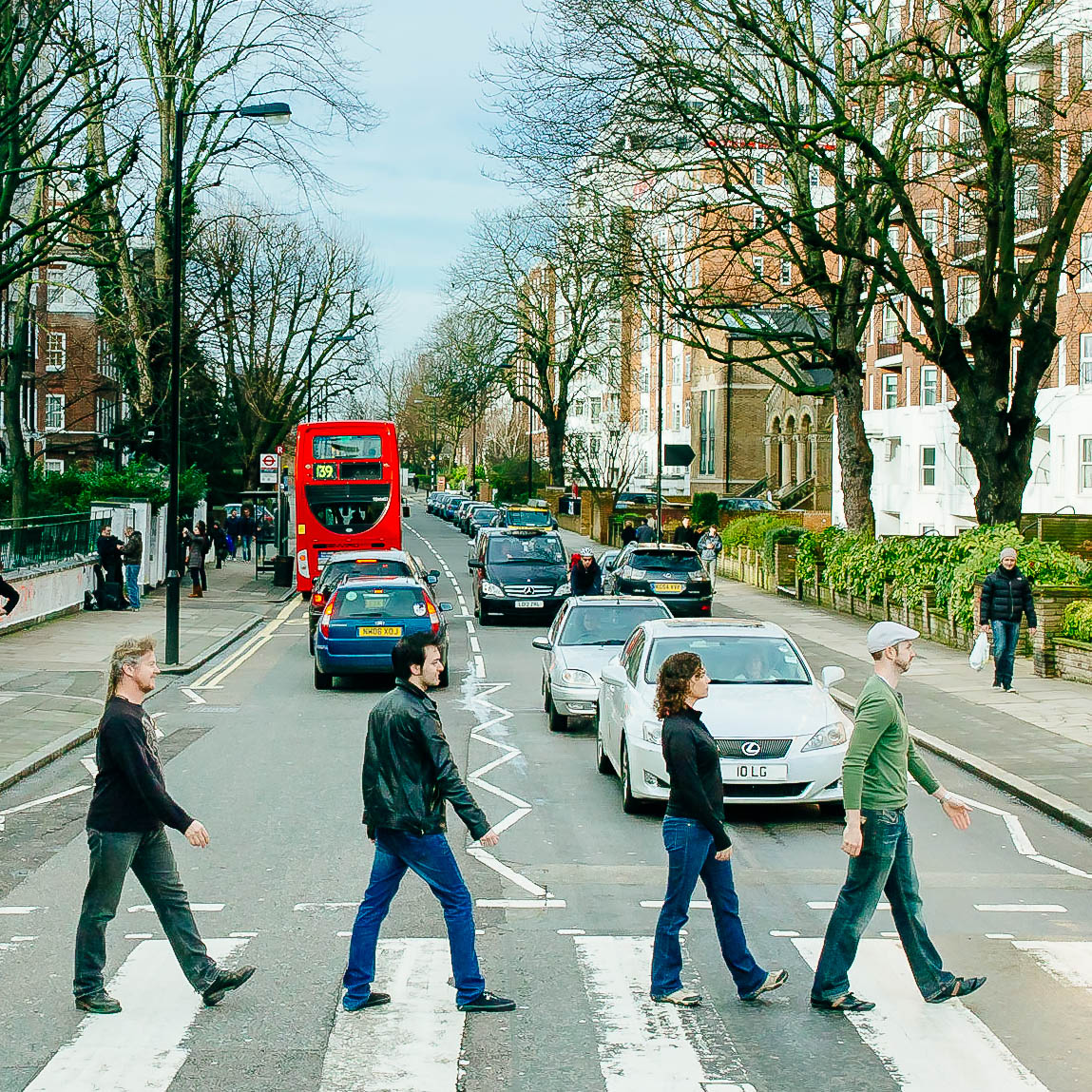
Fans recreating the cover in 2014.

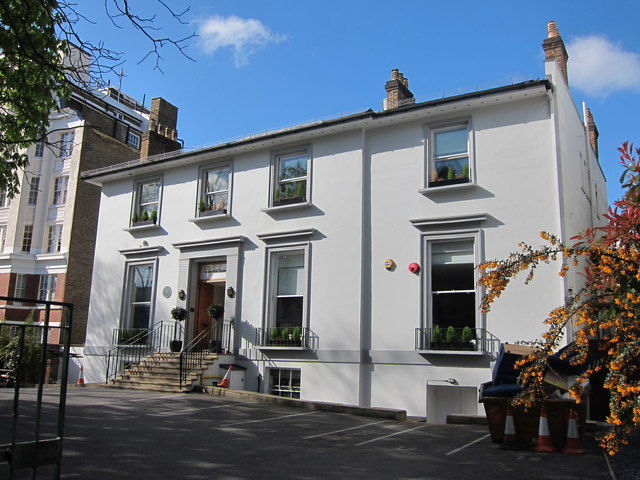
Abbey Road Studios, which stands beside the zebra crossing.

== See also ==
- Pop-culture tourism
