= South Hampstead railway station =

London Overground railway station in the London Borough of Camden

South Hampstead
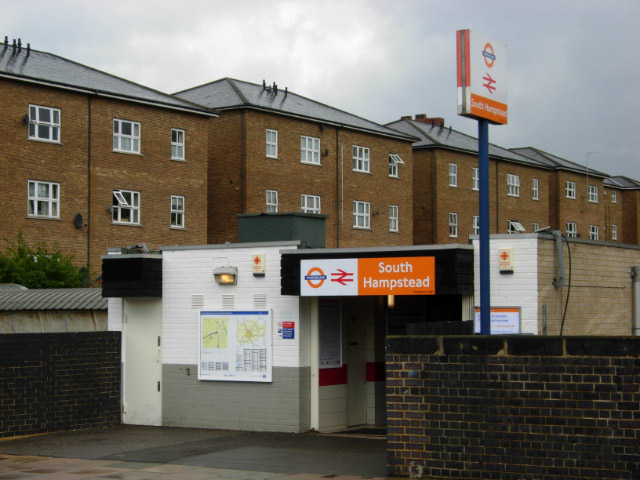
- Station entrance on Loudoun Road
- Interactive map of South Hampstead

General information
- Location: South Hampstead
- Local authority: London Borough of Camden
- Grid reference: TQ263840
- Managed by: London Overground
- Owner: Network Rail
- Station code: SOH
- DfT category: E
- Number of platforms: 2
- Fare zone: 2

National Rail annual entry and exit
- 2020–21: ▼0.165 million
- 2021–22: ▲0.339 million
- 2022–23: ▲0.395 million
- 2023–24: ▲0.429 million
- 2024–25: ▲0.478 million

Key dates
- 2 June 1879: Opened as Loudon Road
- 1 January 1917: Closed
- 10 July 1922: Reopened as South Hampstead
- ? 1960s: Main Line platforms demolished

Other information
- External links: Departures; Facilities
- Coordinates: 51.5408°N 0.1802°W

South Hampstead is a London Overground station on the Lioness line, situated on Loudoun Road in the London Borough of Camden. It is about 550 yards (500 m) south west of Swiss Cottage Underground station.

The Chiltern Main Line crosses over the east end of the station on a bridge, briefly in open air between tunnelled sections on each side of the cutting.

== History ==
South Hampstead opened in 1879 as "Loudon Road station" and acquired its present name in 1922. Two platforms on the Watford DC line remain; those on the slow main lines were largely demolished in the 1960s. During the West Coast Main Line electrification the original LNWR street building was replaced by one in the 1960s "brick lavatory" style and a new station footbridge was constructed. Traces of the removed station canopies and older footbridge can be seen in the brickwork of the retaining walls on both sides of the line.

South Hampstead station was evocatively described by Sir John Betjeman in his First and Last Loves, 1952.

== Services ==
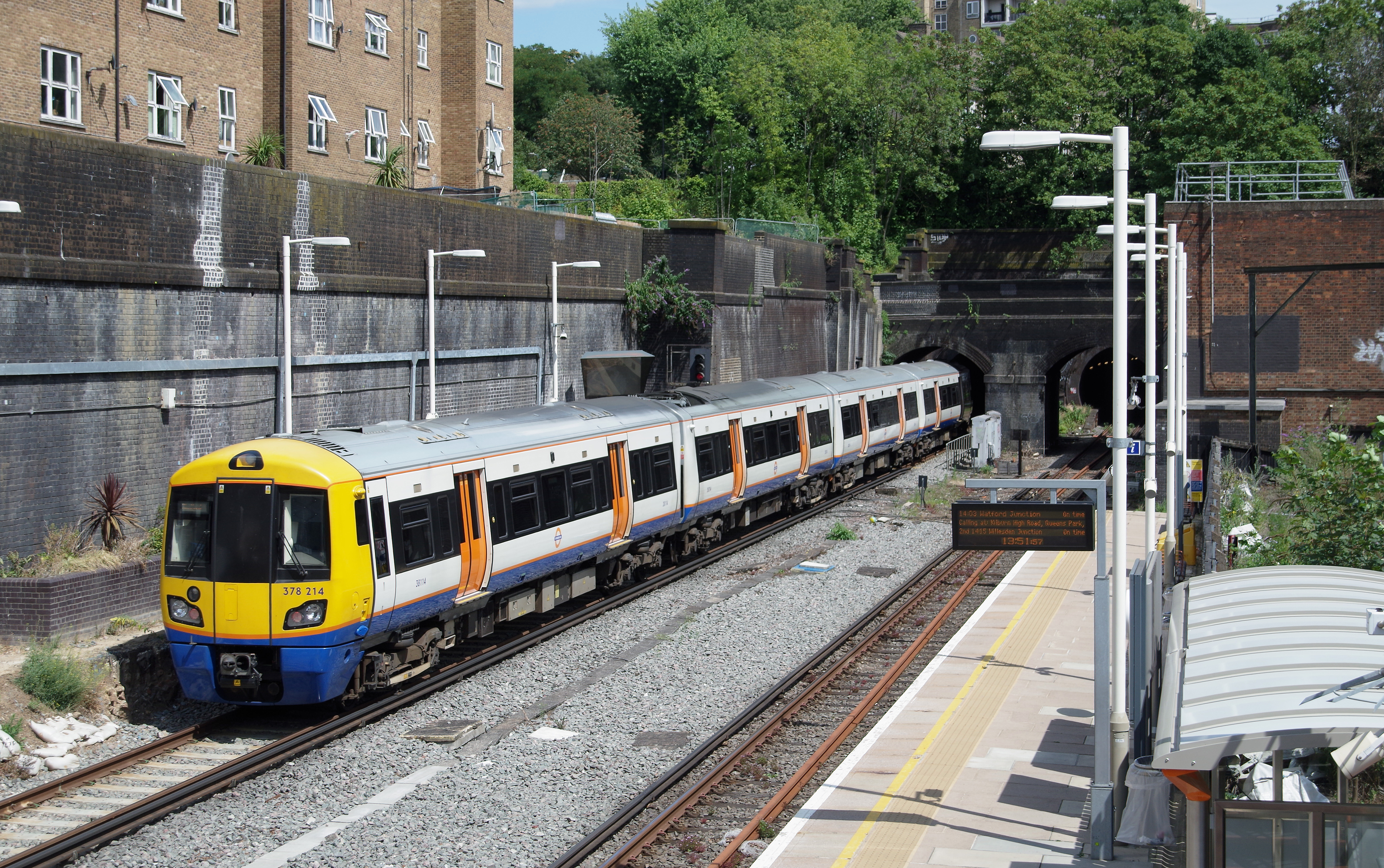
An Overground Class 378 at the station in 2014

=== London Overground ===
- 4tph to Watford Junction calling at Kilburn High Road, Queens Park, Kensal Green, Willesden Junction, Harlesden, Stonebridge Park, Wembley Central, North Wembley, South Kenton, Kenton, Harrow & Wealdstone, Headstone Lane, Hatch End, Carpenders Park, Bushey and Watford High Street.
- 4tph to London Euston only.

Preceding station	London Overground	Following station
Kilburn High Road towards Watford Junction	Lioness line Watford DC line	Euston Terminus
Disused railways
Kilburn High Road	Network SouthEast North London Line	Primrose Hill

== Connections ==
London Buses route 31 and night route N28 and N31 serve the station.
