= Kilburn, London =

Area of London, England

Coordinates: 51.5366°N 0.2039°W

Kilburn
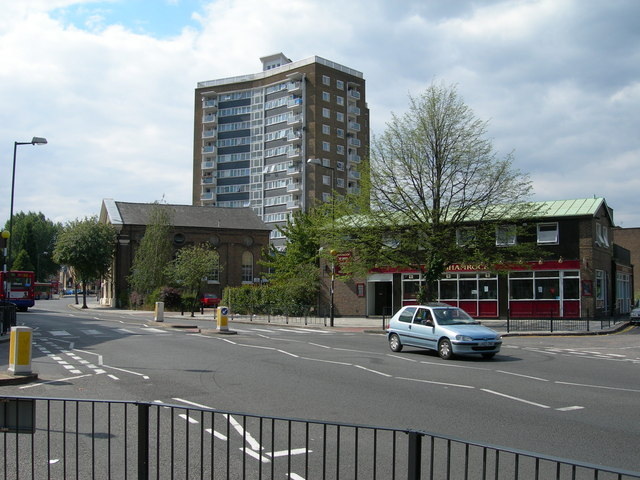
- Carlton Vale and The Shamrock public house

- Location within Greater London
- Population: 29,027 (2011 Census Brent and Camden Wards)
- OS grid reference: TQ245835
- London borough: Brent; Camden; Westminster
- Ceremonial county: Greater London
- Region: London
- Country: England
- Sovereign state: United Kingdom
- Post town: LONDON
- Postcode district: NW6
- Dialling code: 020
- Police: Metropolitan
- Fire: London
- Ambulance: London
- UK Parliament: Hampstead and Highgate; Queen's Park and Maida Vale
- London Assembly: Brent and Harrow; Barnet and Camden; West Central

Kilburn is an area in North West London, in the London Boroughs of Camden, Brent and the City of Westminster. Kilburn High Road railway station lies 3.5 miles (5.6 km) north-west of Charing Cross.

Kilburn developed from a linear hamlet that grew up on ancient Watling Street (the modern A5 Road). The hamlet took its name from Kilburn Priory, which was built on the banks of Kilburn Brook. Watling Street forms the contemporary boundary between the boroughs of Brent and Camden.

The area has London's highest Irish population, as well as a sizable Afro-Caribbean population, and was once home to the black civil rights leader Billy Strachan.

== Geographic and administrative context ==
Kilburn has never been an administrative unit and has therefore never had any formally defined boundaries. The area, which took its name from a nearby watercourse and eponymous priory, developed from a linear hamlet along Watling Street (here called Kilburn High Road) which was the boundary of the Ancient parishes of Willesden – to the west of Watling Street and now part of Brent, and Hampstead to the east (now part of Camden). These parishes subsequently became a Municipal and a Metropolitan Borough respectively (based on the same boundaries), before merging with neighbouring areas in 1965 to form modern London Boroughs of which they are now part.

A map showing the Kilburn ward of Hampstead Metropolitan Borough as it appeared in 1916.

If Kilburn is taken to extend into the City of Westminster then the historic districts it overlaps are Paddington, to the west of Watling Street, and Marylebone to the east of it. Both of these areas became part of the City of Westminster in 1965. The electoral wards of Kilburn (Camden) and Kilburn (Brent) cover some of the area. Much of the area is in the NW6 postcode area, and by some interpretations the area extends into W9; however, these do not define Kilburn; postcode areas were never intended to delineate districts, and Kilburn (like many London districts) overlaps with others, some which have a history of formal definition (e.g. Willesden, Hampstead) and others which do not (e.g. Brondesbury in Willesden).

== History ==
Kilburn High Road originated as an ancient trackway, part of a route between the Brittonic settlements now known as Canterbury and St Albans. Under Roman rule, the route was paved. In Anglo-Saxon times the road became known as Watling Street.

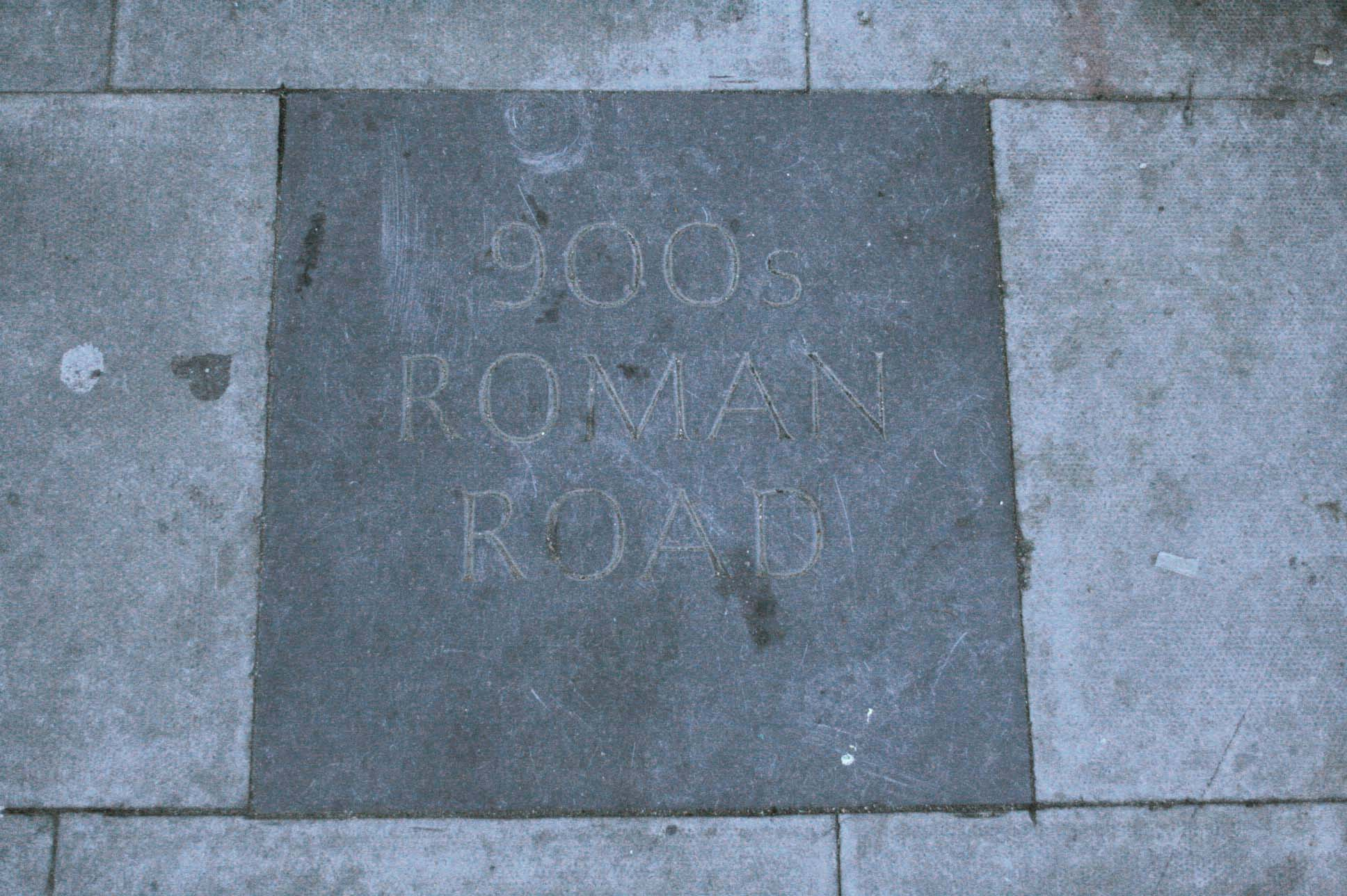
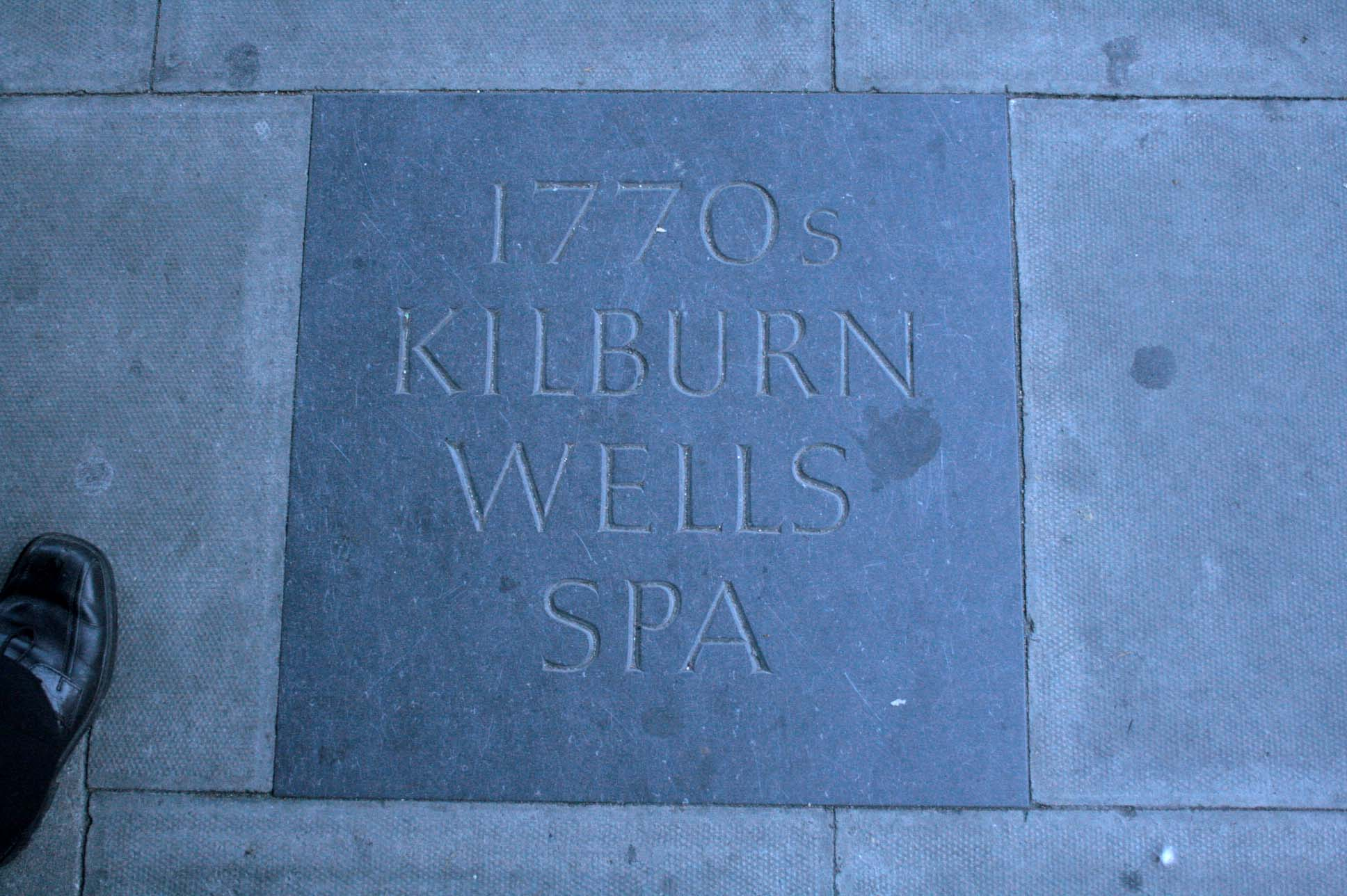
Paving stones in Kilburn, commemorating the route of Watling Street on High Road (left) and commemorating the former Wells on the corner of Belsize Road and the High Road (right)

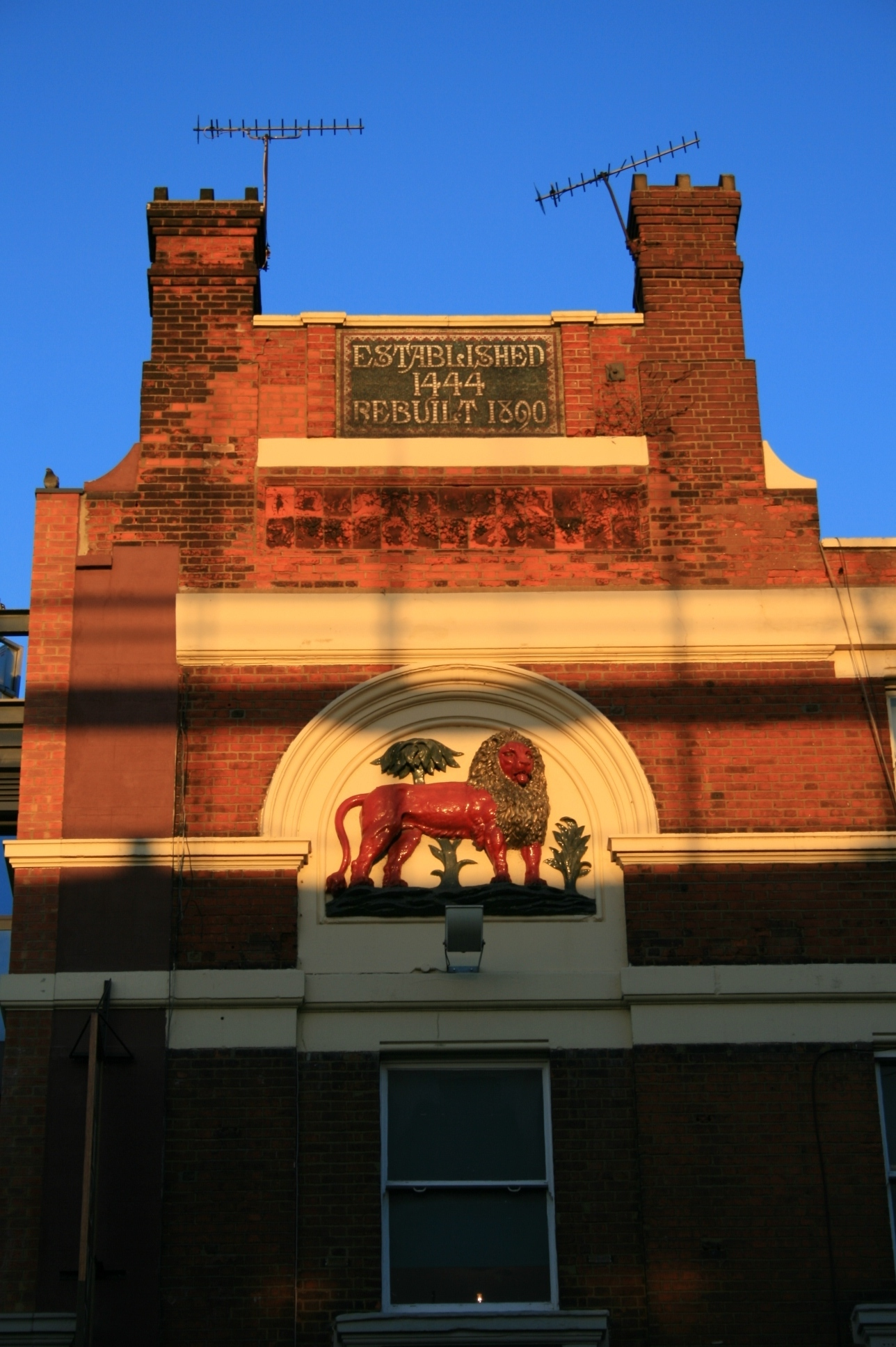
The Red Lion, est. 1444

Kilburn Priory was built on the banks of a stream variously recorded as Cuneburna, Kelebourne and Cyebourne (in the latter source most other places with the phonetic sound /kiː/ were rendered in writing Cy such as Cynestone (Kingston)). The stream flowed from Hampstead through this parish, then through Paddington (specifically through areas that became "Westbourne", "Bayswater" and Hyde Park), South Kensington, and the narrow east part of Chelsea into the Thames. The first two names perhaps imply meanings of "King's Bourne" and "Cattle Bourne". The word Bourne is the southern variant of burn (any small "river"), as still commonly used in the technical term, winterbourne - a watercourse which tends to dry up in dry periods. The river is known today as the Westbourne. From the 1850s many of its feeder ditches were diverted into combined sewers feeding away to the east; it was otherwise piped underground and became one of London's underground rivers.

The name "Kilburn" was first recorded in 1134 as Cuneburna, referring to the priory which had been built on the site of the cell of a hermit known as Godwyn. Godwyn had built his hermitage by the Kilburn river during the reign (1100-1135) of Henry I, and both his hermitage and the priory took their name from the river.

Kilburn Priory was a small community of nuns, probably Augustinian canonesses. It was founded in 1134 at the Kilburn river crossing on Watling Street (the modern-day junction of Kilburn High Road and Belsize Road). Kilburn Priory's position on Watling Street meant that it became a popular resting point for pilgrims heading for the shrines at St Albans and Willesden. Henry VIII's administration dissolved the priory in 1536–37, and nothing remains of it today except the name of Abbey Road (in nearby St John's Wood), named from a track which once led to the priory. The priory lands included a mansion and a hostium (a guesthouse), which may have been the origin of the Red Lion pub, thought to have been founded in 1444. Opposite, the Bell Inn opened around 1600, on the site of the old mansion.

The fashion for taking "medicinal waters" in the 18th century came to Kilburn when a well of chalybeate waters (water impregnated with iron) was discovered near the Bell Inn in 1714. In an attempt to compete with the nearby Hampstead Well, gardens and a "great room" opened to promote the well, and its waters were promoted in journals of the day as cure for "stomach ailments":

Kilburn Wells, near Paddington.—The waters are now in the utmost perfection; the gardens enlarged and greatly improved; the house and offices re-painted and beautified in the most elegant manner. The whole is now open for the reception of the public, the great room being particularly adapted to the use and amusement of the politest companies. Fit either for music, dancing, or entertainments. This happy spot is equally celebrated for its rural situation, extensive prospects, and the acknowledged efficacy of its waters; is most delightfully situated on the site of the once famous Abbey of Kilburn, on the Edgware Road, at an easy distance, being but a morning's walk, from the metropolis, two miles from Oxford Street; the footway from the Mary-bone across the fields still nearer. A plentiful larder is always provided, together with the best of wines and other liquors. Breakfasting and hot loaves. A printed account of the waters, as drawn up by an eminent physician, is given gratis at the Wells.

— The Public Advertiser, July 17, 1773

In the 19th century the wells declined, but the Kilburn Wells remained popular as a tea garden. The Bell was demolished and rebuilt in 1863, the building which stands there today. The Kilburn stretch of Watling Street, now called Edgware Road and Kilburn High Road, was gradually built up with inns and farm houses. Despite the discovery of the medicinal well in 1714, and the construction of gardens and a fine room to exploit the water, Kilburn did not attract any significant building until around 1819 in the area near St John's Wood. These 19th century developments mark the emergence of the nucleated roadside hamlet from which the modern district of Kilburn developed.

Between 1839 and 1856, the newsagent and future First Lord of the Admiralty William Henry Smith lived in a house to the west of Kilburn High Road. Solomon Barnett developed much of the area in the last decades of the 19th century, naming many of the streets after places in the West Country (e.g. Torbay) or after popular poets of the day (e.g. Tennyson) in honour of his wife.

The funeral of Michael Gaughan, an Irish republican and a member of the Provisional Irish Republican Army (IRA) who died from hunger strike in 1974, took place on 8 June 1974. Over 3,000 mourners lined the streets of Kilburn and marched behind his coffin – which was flanked by an IRA "honour guard" – to a Requiem Mass held in the Church of the Sacred Heart of Jesus. The Biddy Mulligan's pub on High Road, which was popular among the local Irish population, was bombed in retaliation on 21 December 1975 by the Ulster Defence Association (UDA), an Ulster loyalist group during the Troubles of Northern Ireland. Although there were 90 people in the pub at the time of the bomb, there were few injuries. It was the only loyalist bombing in London during the conflict in Northern Ireland.

== Demographics ==
Kilburn has a number of different ethnic groups, including people of Irish, Afro-Caribbean, Indian, Bangladeshi, Pakistani, Eritrean and Ethiopian descent. As the area is split between more than one London borough, statistics are gathered from different parts of Kilburn.

The Kilburn ward of Brent was 28% White British, 17% White Other, and 12% Black African in the 2011 census. The Kilburn ward of Camden was 35% White British and 19% White Other. The Maida Vale ward of Westminster was 38% White British and 22% White Other.

4.7% of the population was born in Ireland with an even higher percentage of second-generation (born in England of Irish descent) people, giving it the highest Irish population of any London area. Irish community activities, pubs, local GAA sports clubs, and annual St Patrick's Day celebrations are prominent in parts of the area. The 2007 Irish-language film Kings has been associated with Kilburn, a number of scenes were filmed there, and is based on Jimmy Murphy's play, The Kings of the Kilburn High Road.

=== Housing and inequality ===
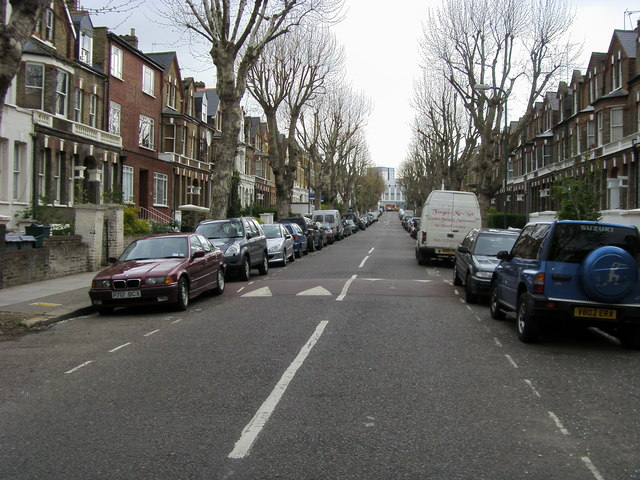
Large homes on Brondesbury Villas

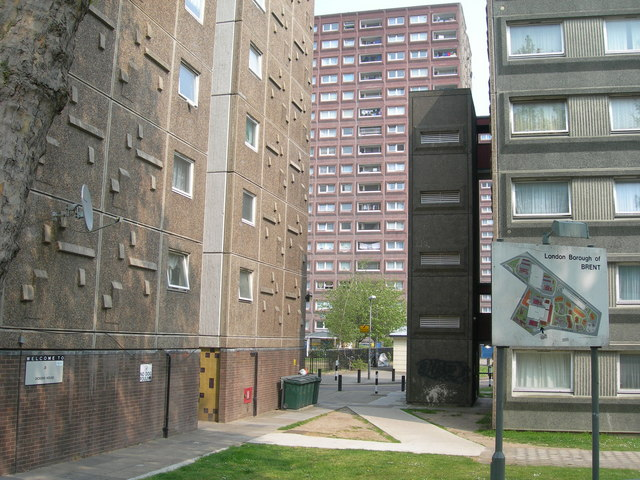
Blocks in the South Kilburn housing estate

Kilburn has a high degree of socio-economic inequality, as it is home to both large and expensive Victorian and Edwardian houses as well as deprived, often run-down council housing estates.

== Landmarks ==
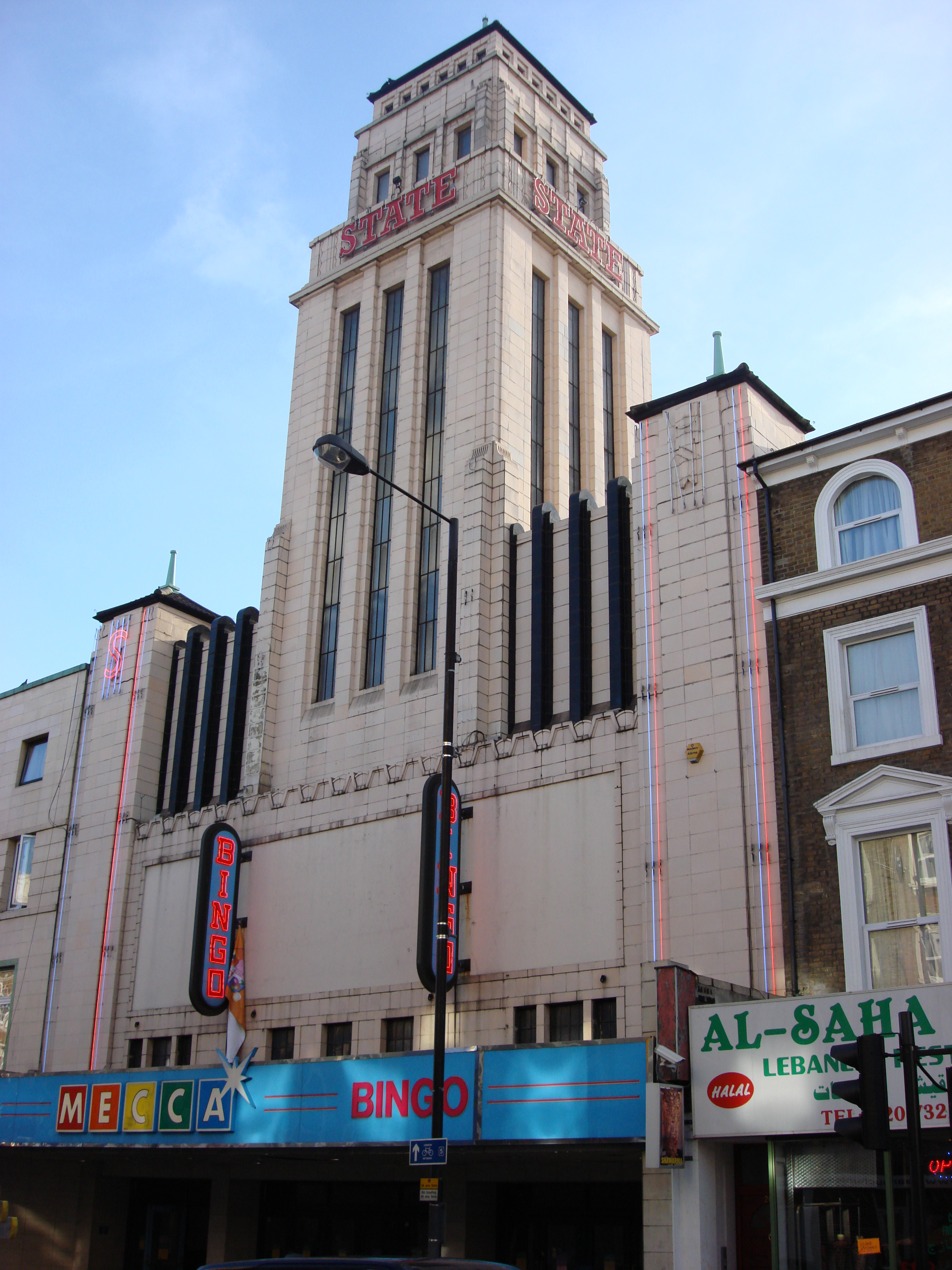
The Gaumont State Cinema on Kilburn High Road

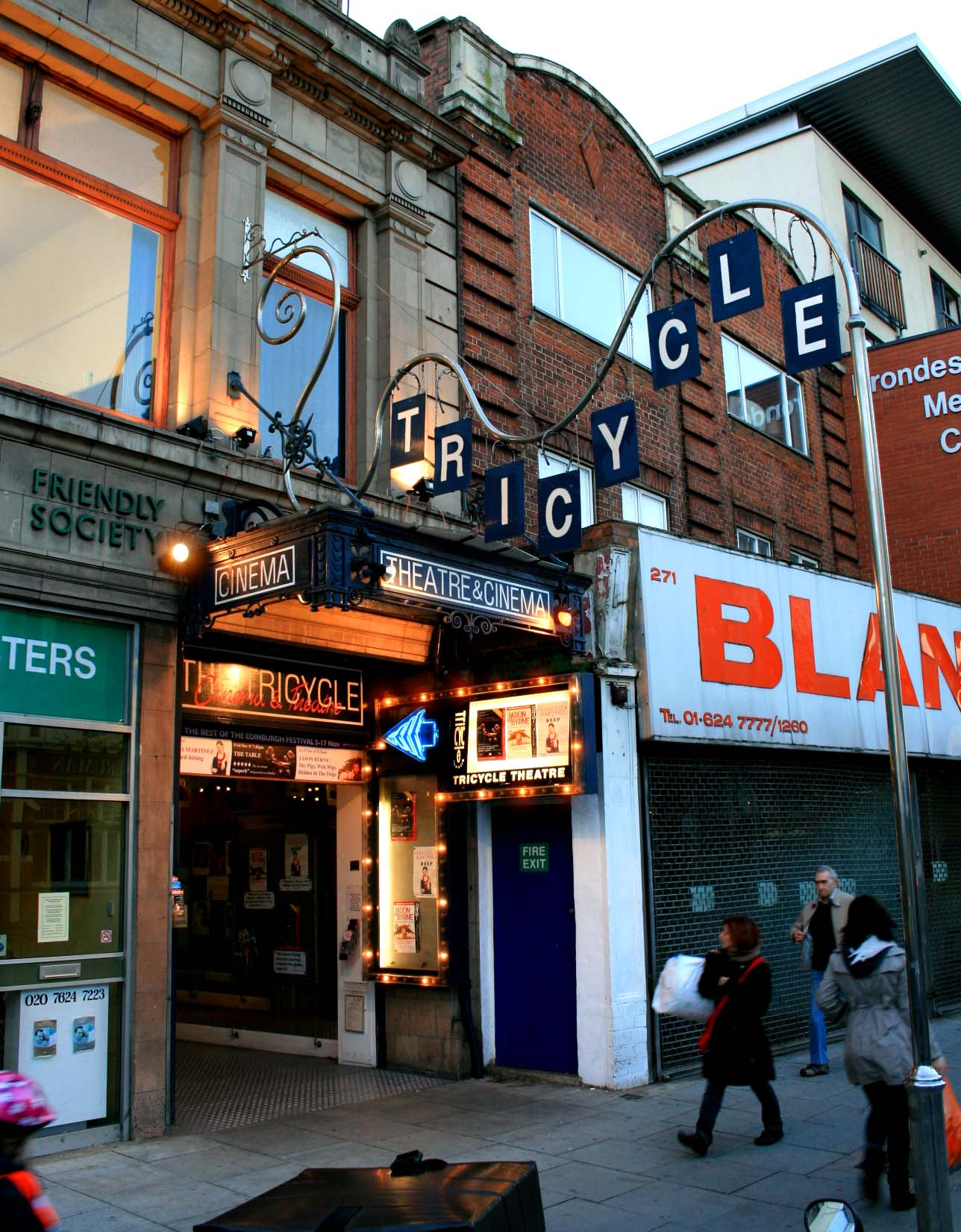
The Tricycle Theatre (now The Kiln)

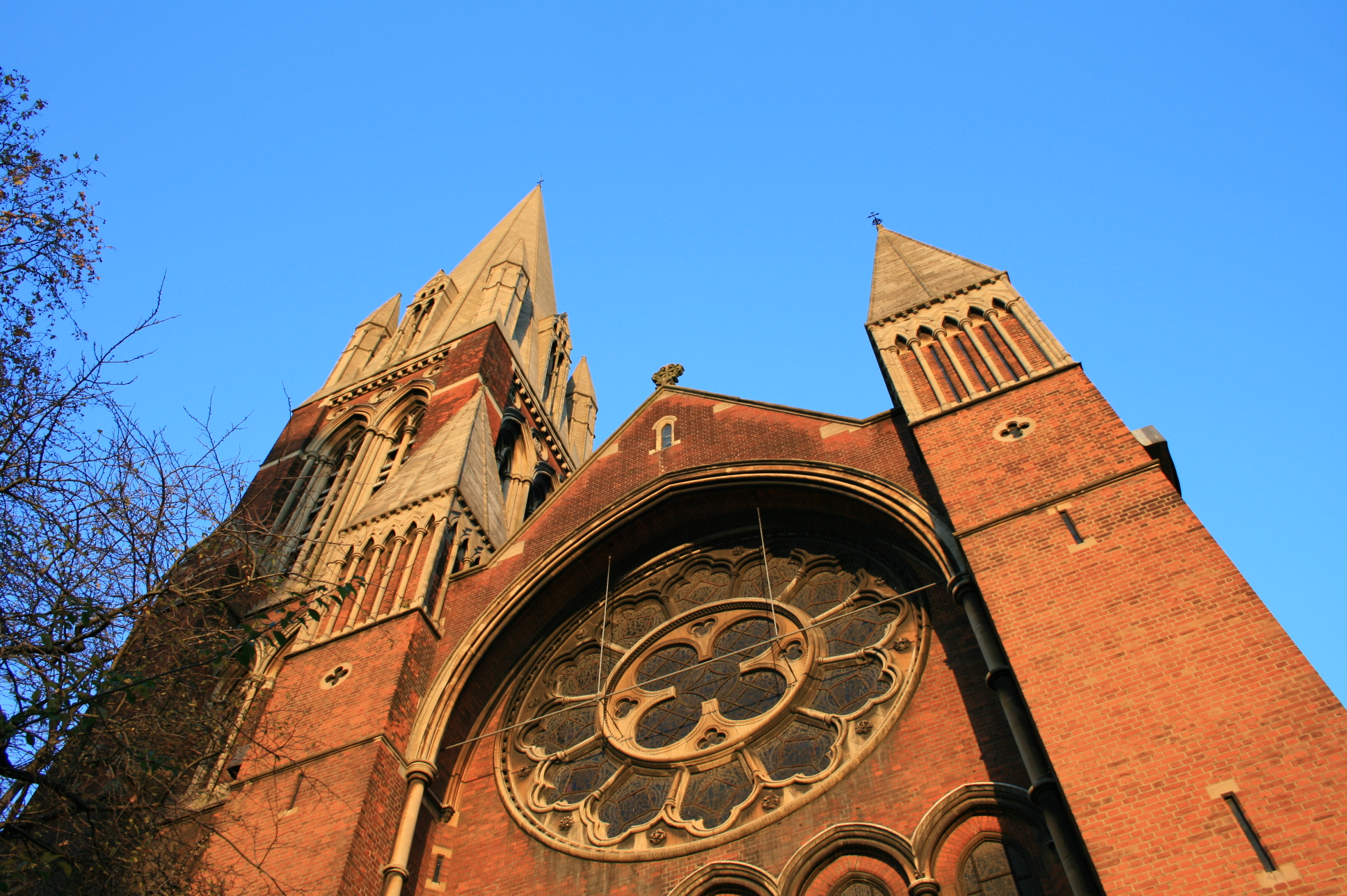
St Augustine's Kilburn

=== Kilburn High Road ===
Kilburn High Road is the main road in Kilburn. It follows a part of the line of the Roman route, Iter III in the Antonine Itinerary, which later took the Anglo-Saxon name Watling Street. This was based on an earlier Celtic route from Verlamion to Durovernum Cantiacorum, modern day St Albans and Canterbury.

Running roughly north-west to south-east, it forms the boundary between the London boroughs of Camden to the east and Brent to the west. It is the section of the Edgware Road (itself part of the A5) between Shoot Up Hill and Maida Vale.

There are two railway stations on Kilburn High Road: Brondesbury station (London Overground on the Mildmay line). Approximately 1.25 km (nearly a mile) further south is Kilburn High Road station (also London Overground, on the Watford DC Line). Kilburn Park Underground station, on the Bakerloo line, lies a little west of the southern end of the High Road. Kilburn Underground station sits on the northern side of the intersection of Christchurch Avenue and Kilburn High Road, which marks the High Road's northern boundary.

The green space of Kilburn Grange Park is located to the east side of Kilburn High Road.

The name of Ian Dury's first band, Kilburn and the High Roads, refers to this road, as does the Flogging Molly song, "Kilburn High Road" and the Shack song, "Kilburn High Road".

=== Gaumont State Cinema ===
A landmark in Kilburn High Road is the Grade II* listed Art Deco Gaumont State Cinema, designed by George Coles and opened in 1937. It was the biggest auditorium in Europe at the time, with seating for 4,004 people. For twenty years, the building was run as a bingo hall by Mecca Bingo. In December 2007, it was purchased by Ruach City Church.

=== The Kiln Theatre ===
The Kiln Theatre is located on Kilburn High Road north of Buckley Road. It was opened in 1980 as the Tricycle Theatre in a converted Foresters' Hall, and was renamed the Kiln in April 2018. The Kiln complex includes a cinema. The theatre also runs an extensive community outreach programme. For nearly 30 years (1984–2012) the Tricycle was run by Nicolas Kent who, as artistic director, built the theatre's reputation for political dramas including verbatim plays based on recent events, and for plays that reflected the experiences of local communities - Irish, Afro-Caribbean and Asian. In 2012, Indhu Rubasingham succeeded Kent as artistic director. She continued the theatre's radical reputation. She also oversaw a major revamp of the building and, controversially, renamed the theatre the Kiln. In 2024 she left the Kiln, having been appointed director of the Royal National Theatre. She was succeeded at the Kiln by Amit Sharma. Sharma said: "The Kiln is a theatre right at the heart of its community – a beacon for the people of Brent, bringing audiences to the borough from across London, the UK and internationally. There's a magic that happens on that stage."

He outlined his first season and his plans for the theatre in a YouTube video.

Other buildings

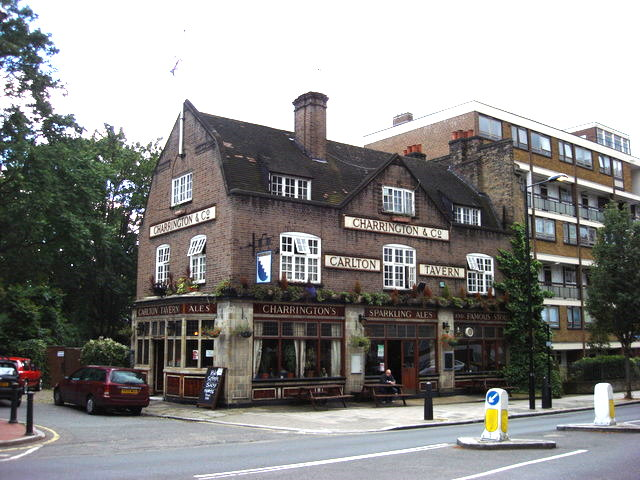
The Carlton Tavern, before demolition (now rebuilt)

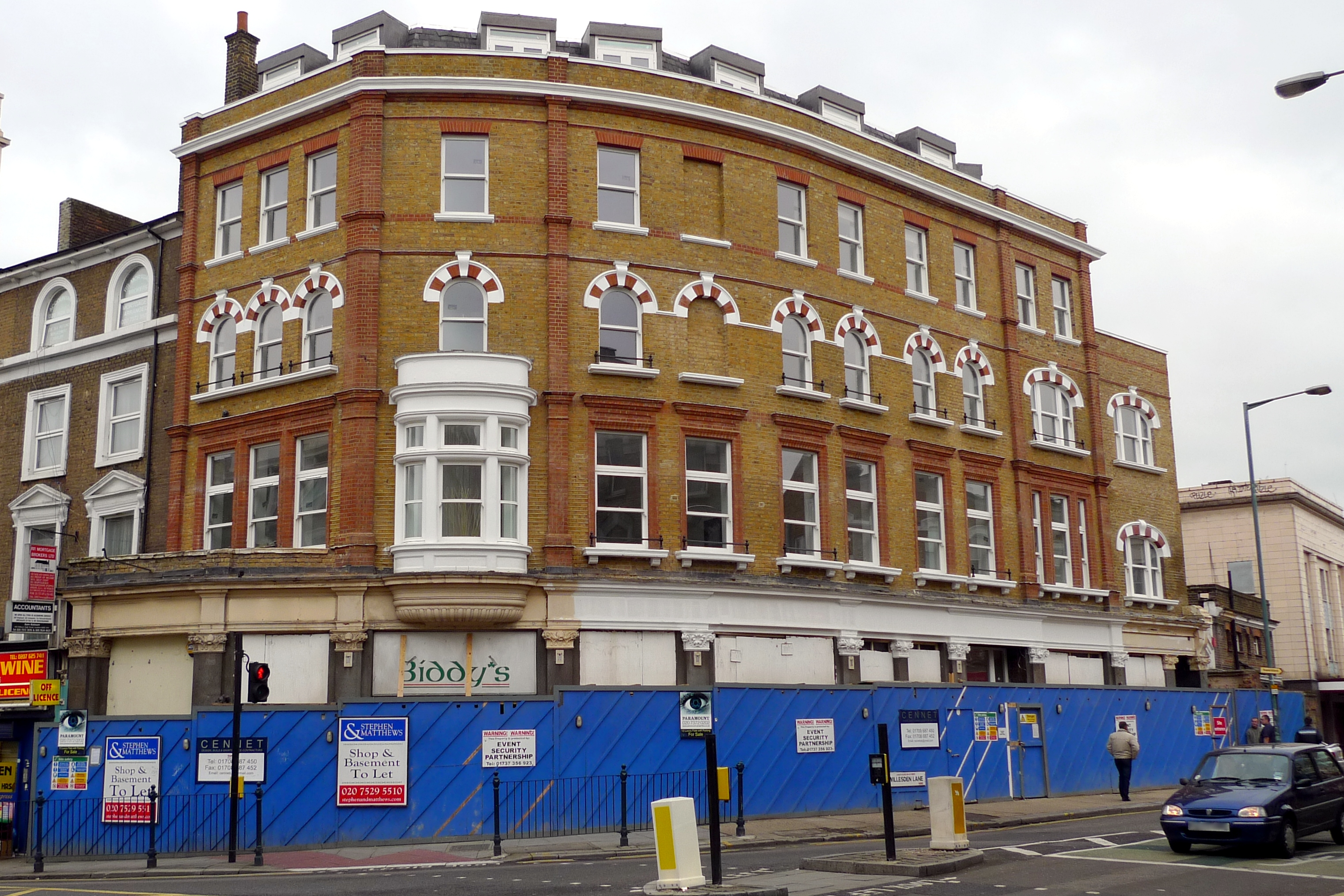
The former Biddy Mulligan's pub, site of the Ulster loyalist bombing in 1975, pictured in 2009 by when it closed down

To the south, the Kilburn skyline is dominated by the Gothic Revival spire of St. Augustine's, Kilburn. Completed in 1880 by the architect John Loughborough Pearson, the church has an ornate Victorian interior, a carved stone reredos and screen and stained glass, adjacent to its partners, St Augustine's Primary and Secondary Schools. The church is sometimes nicknamed "the Cathedral of North London" due to its size - at the time of construction, it was the third-largest place of worship in London, after St Paul's Cathedral and Westminster Abbey.

Located at 10 Cambridge Avenue, just off Kilburn High Road, is "The Animals WW1 memorial dispensary". The building itself dates back to the early 1930s. Formally opened in March 1931, it treated over 6,000 animals in its first year. The front of the building has a large bronze plaque above the door as a memorial to animals killed in the first world war. It's an impressive piece of bronze sculpture by F Brook Hitch of Hertford. Next door at 12-14 Cambridge Avenue, is one of the only surviving London examples of a "tin tabernacle" from 1863, which is currently used by a local arts charity. This very unusual building, originally built as St. James' Episcopal Chapel, is Grade II listed and is open to the public on Saturdays.

Just to the south of St. Augustine's on Carlton Vale stands the rebuilt Carlton Tavern, a pub built in 1920-21 for Charrington Brewery and thought to be the work of the architect Frank J Potter. The building, noted for its unaltered 1920s interiors and faience tile exterior, was being considered by Historic England for Grade II listing when it was unexpectedly demolished in March 2015 by the property developer CLTX Ltd to make way for a new block of flats. The pub was subsequently rebuilt and re-opened following a community campaign and planning appeals.

205 High Road was home to the Irish pub Biddy Mulligan's. It was built in 1862 as was originally known as The Victoria Tavern. It was renamed in the 1970s, with the name Biddy Mulligan taken from a character of Irish comedian Jimmy O'Dea, a character dressed as a female street seller in Dublin from the 1930s onwards. The pub was bombed on 21 December 1975 by the Ulster Defence Association (UDA), an Ulster loyalist group that fought against Irish republicans in Northern Ireland (The Troubles). The pub was later renamed as Biddy's, before briefly turning into an Australian sports bar called Southern K, and then closing in 2009 to make way for a new Ladbrokes branch.

== Transport ==
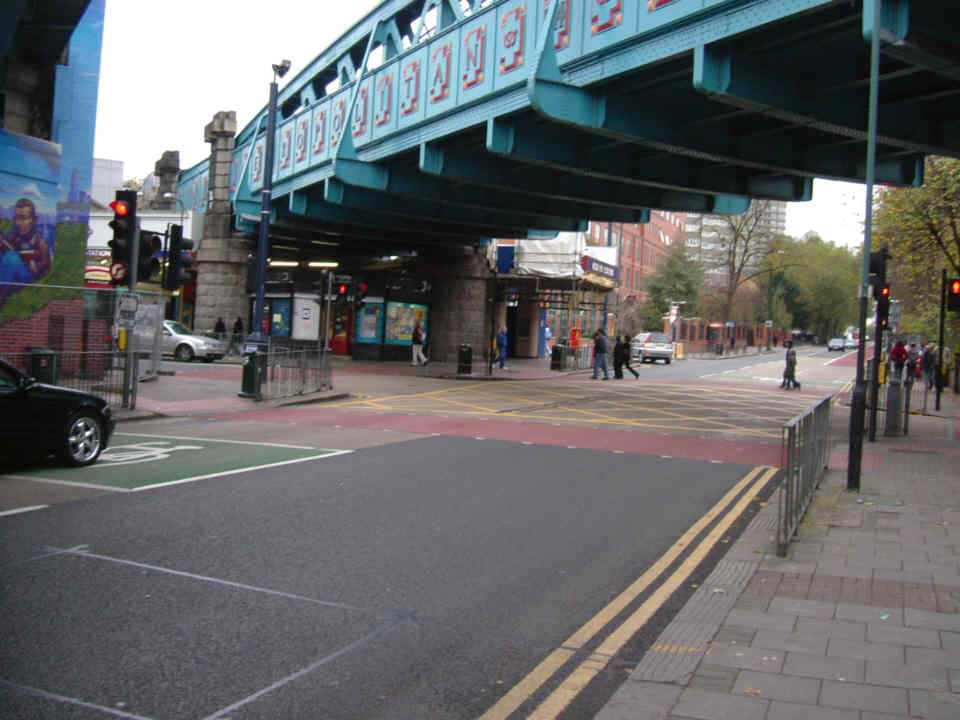
Area around Kilburn station

=== Tube/train ===
Kilburn High Road is served by several railway lines which traverse the road in an east–west direction, connecting the area with central London and outer north-west London suburbs. The railways were first introduced to Kilburn in 1852 when the London & North Western Railway opened Kilburn & Maida Vale station (today's Kilburn High Road railway station), followed by two stations opened in the Brondesbury area of Kilburn by the Hampstead Junction Railway (1860) and the Metropolitan Railway (1879). Numerous plans were drawn up at the turn of the 20th century to construct an underground railway tunnel under the length of the Edgware Road and Kilburn High Road, including an unusual scheme to build a type of subterranean monorail roller coaster, but these proposals were abandoned.

Today, Kilburn is served by London Underground and London Overground from the following stations:

- Kilburn Park station (London Underground Bakerloo line) - Central Kilburn
- Brondesbury station (London Overground Mildmay line) - North Kilburn
- Kilburn High Road station (London Overground Lioness line) - Central Kilburn

Despite its name, Kilburn tube station (Jubilee line) is actually in Brondesbury Park rather than in Kilburn itself.

=== Bus ===
Kilburn is served by many bus routes that go along the High Road. Most routes come south from Cricklewood, and serve various points in central and west London.

== Media ==
The Brent & Kilburn Times and the Camden New Journal provide local news in print and online forms. In the 2017 film, The Only Living Boy in New York, Kate Beckinsale's character, Mimi, explains that she moved from Belsize Park to Kilburn because it felt more real.

== Sport ==
=== Football ===
One of the 12 founder members of the Football Association was formed in Kilburn in 1863. It was referred to as the N.N. Club or N.N. Kilburn, "N.N." being thought to stand for "No Names". Its captain Arthur Pember was elected as the first president of the Football Association.

South Kilburn F.C. played in the Middlesex County Football League until withdrawing ahead of the 2021–22 season.

=== Rugby ===
Kilburn is home to Kilburn Cosmos RFC.

=== Gaelic games ===
Kilburn is home to Kilburn Gaels GAA Hurling Club. The club was founded in 1997 and exclusively plays hurling.

== London Plan ==
The area is identified in the London Plan as one of 35 major centres in Greater London.

== Notable residents ==
Notable people who live or have lived in Kilburn include:

- Oni Akerele
- Lily Allen, singer
- Gerry Anderson
- Keith Barber
- Roderick Bradley
- Todd Carty
- Edwyn Collins
- Jack Dromey
- Brian Eno
- Zuhair Hassan, rapper
- Thomas Hodge
- Thandiwe Newton
- Jason Isaacs
- Brian Lawrance, bandleader and singer, lived on Quex Road in the 1930s.
- Annie Mac
- Doreen Massey
- A. A. Milne
- George Orwell
- China Miéville
- David Mitchell, comedian
- Kate Moss
- Cillian Murphy
- Richard Pacquette, footballer
- Daisy Ridley
- Gavin Rossdale
- Andrew Sachs, actor
- Zadie Smith
- Tommy Sparks
- Josiah Stamp, 1st Baron Stamp
- Billy Strachan, Civil rights leader
- Charles "Chucky" Venn
- Louis Wain
- Jamie Waylett, actor
- Robert Webb, actor
- David Winner, author
- Bradley Wiggins, cyclist
- Fredo, rapper
