= South Hampstead =

Area in London, England

Coordinates: 51.5424°N 0.1734°W

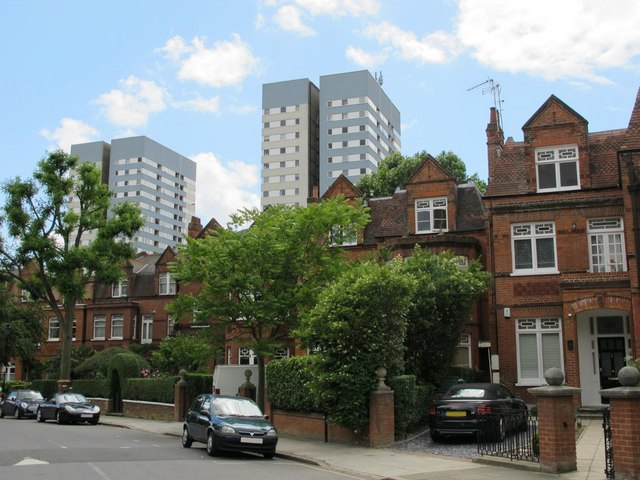

- Location within Greater London
- OS grid reference: TQ266842
- London borough: Camden
- Ceremonial county: Greater London
- Region: London
- Country: England
- Sovereign state: United Kingdom
- Post town: LONDON
- Postcode district: NW3, NW6, NW8
- Dialling code: 020
- Police: Metropolitan
- Fire: London
- Ambulance: London
- UK Parliament: Hampstead and Highgate
- London Assembly: Barnet and Camden

South Hampstead is part of the London Borough of Camden in inner north London. The streets were laid out in the Victorian era. The area was not served by any railways until Loudoun Road station opened in 1879 on the street of that name.

== Notable residents and organisations ==
- T. S. Eliot, poet and winner of the Nobel Prize in Literature, lived at 3 Compayne Gardens with his first wife, Vivienne Haigh-Wood Eliot.
- Silvanus P. Thompson, physicist, who lived on Chislett Road (now Compayne Gardens)
- Mina Loy, writer
- Pete Gage, musician, who briefly lived in Compayne Gardens
- Nahum Sokolow, author and Zionist statesman
- Frederick Rolfe, writer
- The 43 Group, an anti-fascist group of Jewish ex-servicemen after World War II who broke up right wing marches and fought fascists in the streets, was founded here.
- Kylie Minogue, singer
- Barry Humphries, Australian comedian known for playing Dame Edna Everage
- Natalie Imbruglia, singer
- Simon Amstell, comedian
- Lindsay Anderson, film director
- Kathy Lette, comedian, author
- John Mortimer, barrister, writer and creator of Rumpole of the Bailey, lived at 3 Harben Road for ten years.
- Walter Sickert, artist
- John Seymour Lucas, artist
- Banister Fletcher (senior), architect and politician
- Thomas Castaignède, rugby player
- Turner Layton, musician
- Ronald Frankau, comedian
- Kim Philby, British intelligence officer and spy for the Soviet Union as part of the Cambridge Five

== Education ==
South Hampstead High School, an independent girls' day school, is located at 3 Maresfield Gardens in Hampstead.

== Nearby places ==
- Hampstead Village (to the north-east)
- Swiss Cottage (to the south-east) and Primrose Hill (to the far south-east)
- Belsize Park (to the east)
- St John's Wood (to the south)
- West Hampstead (to the north-west)
- Finchley Road where considered a neighbourhood (narrow linear area in the east continuing to the north)
- Maida Vale and Kilburn (to the west)

== Transport ==
=== London Underground and London Overground stations ===
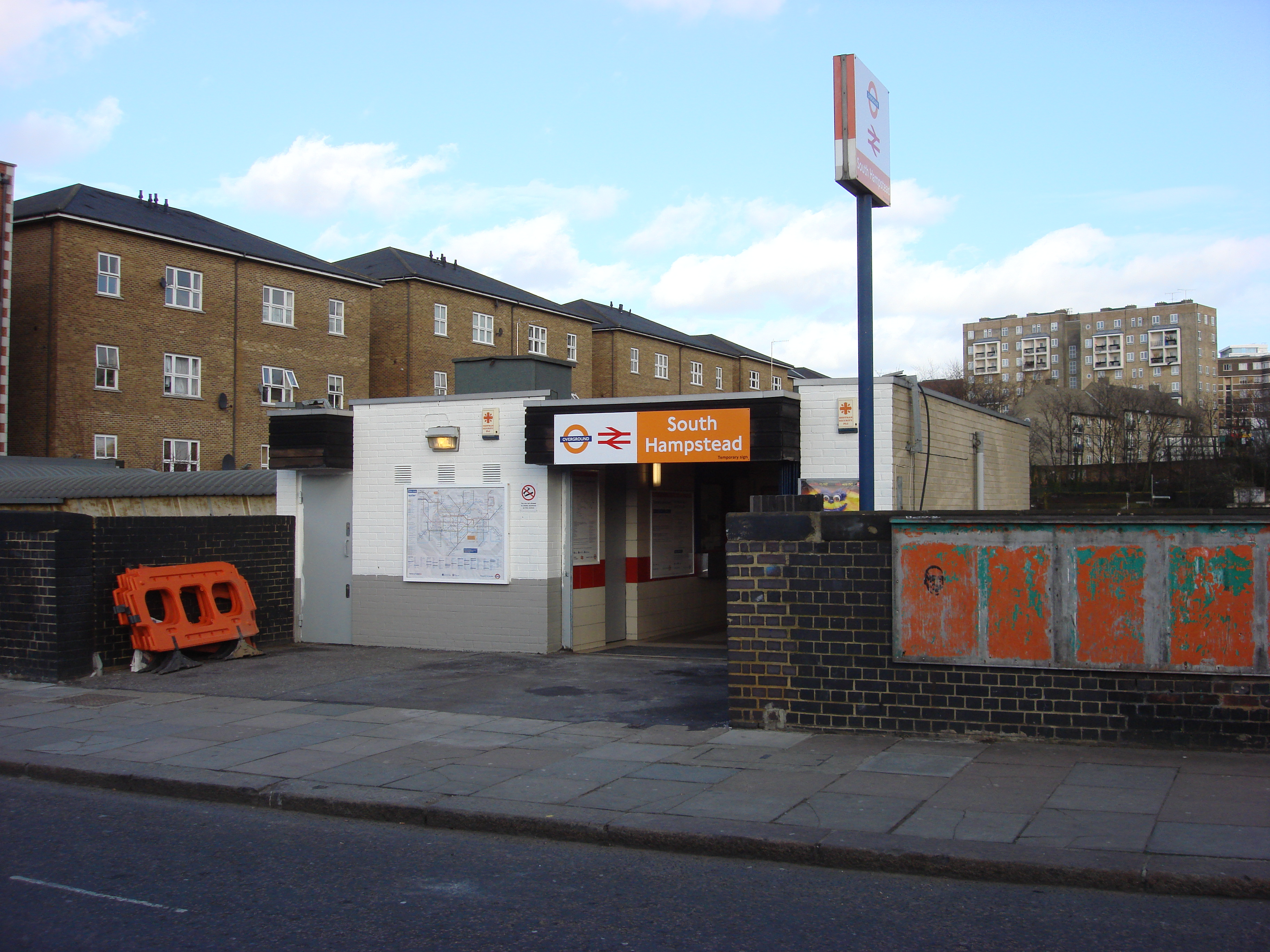
South Hampstead station on Loudoun Road.

- South Hampstead station (London Overground Lioness line)
- Swiss Cottage station (Jubilee line)
- Finchley Road station (Jubilee and Metropolitan lines)
- West Hampstead station (Jubilee line)

=== Bus routes ===
Bus routes 13 (24 hour), 31, 46, 113, 139 (24 hour), 187, 189 (24 hour), 268, 328, 603 and C11 serve the area in addition to night routes N28, N31 and N113.
