= Camden London Borough Council elections =

Class of election in the United Kingdom

Camden London Borough Council in London, England is elected every four years. Since the last boundary changes in 2022, 55 councillors have been elected from 20 wards.

== Council elections ==
Year	Labour	Conservative	Liberal Democrats (Note: Liberal Party, 1964–1978; SDP–Liberal Alliance, 1982–1986.)	Green (Note: Ecology Party, 1982; Green Party (UK), 1986–1990.)	CPA	Council control after election
1964	34	26	0	—N/a	—N/a	Labour
1968	18	42	0	—N/a	—N/a	Conservative
1971 (Note: Boundary changes took place but the number of seats remained the same.)	49	11	0	—N/a	—N/a	Labour
1974	48	12	0	—N/a	—N/a	Labour
1978 (Note: Boundary changes reduced the number of seats by one.)	33	26	0	—N/a	—N/a	Labour
1982	33	26	0	0	—N/a	Labour
1986	44	13	2	0	—N/a	Labour
1990	42	15	2	0	—N/a	Labour
1994 (Note: Boundary changes took place but the number of seats remained the same. (Note: The Barnet, Camden and Westminster (London Borough Boundaries) Order 1993) (Note: The City and London Borough Boundaries Order 1993) (Note: The North London Boroughs (London Borough Boundaries) Order 1993))	47	7	5	0	—N/a	Labour
1998	43	10	6	0	—N/a	Labour
2002 (Note: Boundary changes reduced the number of seats by five.)	35	11	8	0	—N/a	Labour
2006	18	14	20	2	—N/a	No overall control
2010	30	10	13	1	—N/a	Labour
2014	40	12	1	1	—N/a	Labour
2018	43	7	3	1	—N/a	Labour
2022 (Note: Boundary changes increased the number of seats by one.)	47	3	4	1	—N/a	Labour
2026	30	3	10	11	1	Labour

The below chart includes only councillors, not aldermen prior to their abolition in 1978; the presence of aldermen never affected the overall control of the council.

- Labour
- Greens
- Lib Dems/Alliance
- Conservatives
- CPA

=== Result maps ===
1978 results map

1982 results map

1986 results map

1990 results map

1994 results map

1998 results map

2002 results map

2006 results map

2010 results map

2014 results map

2018 results map

2022 results map

2026 results map

== Wards ==
Wards were established for Camden when it came into existence on 1 April 1965. The first elections of ward councillors took place in 1964. These boundaries were also used for the 1968, 1971 and 1974 elections. For the 1978 elections the ward boundaries were revised in Camden. These boundaries were then also used at the 1982, 1986 and 1990 elections.

For the May 1994 elections there were some minor adjustments to London borough boundaries, which caused some Camden wards to have small changes in area and population. These boundaries were also used at the 1998 elections. New ward boundaries came into effect at the May 2002 elections. They were also used at the 2006, 2010, 2014 and 2018 elections.

Camden was subject to a boundary review in 2020. In February 2020, the Local Government Boundary Commission for England released its final recommendations that the borough should be divided into 15 three-member wards and 5 two-member wards. The wards were approved by Parliament in October 2020, and were first used at the 2022 election.

The new wards from May 2022 are:

- Belsize
- Bloomsbury
- Camden Square
- Camden Town
- Fortune Green
- Frognal
- Gospel Oak
- Hampstead Town
- Haverstock
- Highgate
- Holborn and Covent Garden
- Kentish Town North
- Kentish Town South
- Kilburn
- King's Cross
- Primrose Hill
- Regent's Park
- South Hampstead
- St Pancras and Somers Town
- West Hampstead

The wards from 2002 to 2022 were:

- Belsize
- Bloomsbury
- Camden Town with Primrose Hill
- Cantelowes
- Fortune Green
- Frognal and Fitzjohns
- Gospel Oak
- Hampstead Town
- Haverstock
- Highgate
- Holborn and Covent Garden
- Kentish Town
- Kilburn
- King's Cross
- Regent's Park
- St Pancras and Somers Town
- Swiss Cottage
- West Hampstead

== By-elections ==
Conservative gain
Green gain
Labour gain
Liberal Democrats gain

By elections 2026–2030
Ward	Date	Incumbent	Party	Winner	Party	Cause
Regent's Park	9 July 2026	Muhammad Abu Naser	Green	Nanouche Umeadi	Labour	Disqualification due to employment by the council.

By elections 2022–2026
Ward	Date	Incumbent	Party	Winner	Party	Cause
West Hampstead	28 August 2025	Shiva Tiwari	Labour (Note: Tiwari was elected as a Labour councillor, but defected to the Conservatives in March 2025.)	Janet Grauberg	Liberal Democrats	Resignation.
Camden Square	5 September 2024	Danny Beales	Labour	Patricia Leman	Labour	Resignation due to being elected as an MP.
Kentish Town South	5 September 2024	Georgia Gould	Labour	Joseph Ball	Labour	Resignation due to being elected as an MP.
Kilburn	5 September 2024	Lloyd Hatton	Labour	Robert Thompson	Labour	Resignation due to being elected as an MP.
Frognal	2 May 2024	Gio Spinella	Conservative	Steve Adams	Conservative	Resignation due to personal circumstances.
Highgate	30 November 2023	Siân Berry	Green	Lorna Russell	Green	Resignation upon selection as a prospective parliamentary candidate.
South Hampstead	1 June 2023	Will Prince	Labour	Tommy Gale	Labour	Resignation due to work commitments.
Hampstead Town	7 July 2022	Adrian Cohen	Labour	Linda Chung	Liberal Democrats	Resignation due to personal circumstances.

By elections 2018–2022
Ward	Date	Incumbent	Party	Winner	Party	Cause
Fortune Green	22 July 2021	Flick Rea	Liberal Democrats	Nancy Jirira	Liberal Democrats	Resignation for health reasons and due to the return to in-person meetings during the COVID-19 pandemic.
Haverstock	12 December 2019	Abi Wood	Labour	Gail McAnena Wood	Labour	Resignation.

By elections 2014–2018
Ward	Date	Incumbent	Party	Winner	Party	Cause
Gospel Oak	9 November 2017	Theo Blackwell	Labour	Jenny Mulholland	Labour	Resignation on appointment as Chief Digital Officer for London.
Gospel Oak	4 May 2017	Maeve McCormack	Labour	Marcus Boyland	Labour	Resignation due to being unable to live in the London Borough of Camden.
Hampstead Town	7 May 2015	Simon Marcus	Conservative	Oliver Cooper	Conservative	Resignation
St Pancras and Somers Town	6 March 2015	Peter Brayshaw	Labour	Paul Tomlinson	Labour	Death

By elections 2010–2014
Ward	Date	Incumbent	Party	Winner	Party	Cause
Gospel Oak	14 March 2013	Sean Birch	Labour	Maeve McCormack	Labour	Resignation
Hampstead Town	27 September 2012	Kirsty Roberts	Conservative	Simon Marcus	Conservative	Resignation
Camden Town with Primrose Hill	3 May 2012	Thomas Neumark	Labour	Lazzaro Pietragnoli	Labour	Resignation
Highgate	15 September 2011	Michael Nicolaides	Labour	Sally Gimson	Labour	Resignation
Kentish Town	28 October 2010	Dave Horan	Labour	Jenny Headlam-Wells	Labour	Death
Frognal and Fitzjohns	22 July 2010	Martin Davies	Conservative	Gio Spinella	Conservative	Death

By elections 2006–2010
Ward	Date	Incumbent	Party	Winner	Party	Cause
Belsize	2 April 2009	Christopher Basson	Liberal Democrats	Tom Simon	Liberal Democrats	Resignation
Kentish Town	30 October 2008	Philip Thompson	Liberal Democrats	Nick Russell	Liberal Democrats	Resignation
Hampstead Town	25 September 2008	Mike Greene	Conservative	Linda Chung	Liberal Democrats	Resignation
Highgate	1 May 2008	Paul Barton	Conservative	Alex Goodman	Green	Resignation
Fortune Green	21 February 2008	Jane Schopflin	Liberal Democrats	Nancy Jirira	Liberal Democrats	Death
Haverstock	12 July 2007	Roy Shaw	Labour	Matt Sanders	Liberal Democrats	Resignation
Kentish Town	7 December 2006	Lucy Anderson	Labour	Ralph Scott	Liberal Democrats	Resignation

By elections 2002–2006
Ward	Date	Incumbent	Party	Winner	Party	Cause
Haverstock	20 February 2003	John Dickie	Labour	Jill Fraser	Liberal Democrats	Resignation
Camden Town with Primrose Hill	20 June 2002	Justin Barnard	Liberal Democrats	Jake T. Sumner	Labour	Resignation

By elections 1998–2002
Ward	Date	Incumbent	Party	Winner	Party	Cause
Frognal	25 January 2001	Pamela Chesters	Conservative	Mike Greene	Conservative	Resignation
Bloomsbury	28 September 2000	Jake Turnbull	Labour	Peter Brayshaw	Labour	Resignation
Adelaide	3 February 2000	Julian Tobin	Conservative	Peter J. Horne	Conservative	Death
Swiss Cottage	22 April 1999	Mary Ryan	Labour	Honora Morrissey	Conservative	Resignation

By elections 1994–1998
Ward	Date	Incumbent	Party	Winner	Party	Cause
Bloomsbury	4 May 1995	Shelley Burke	Labour	Pat Callaghan	Labour	Resignation
Adelaide	23 February 1995	Peter Day	Labour	Peter Singer	Labour	Resignation

By elections 1990–1994
Ward	Date	Incumbent	Party	Winner	Party	Cause
St Pancras	22 April 1993	Mary Helsdon	Labour	Simon Fletcher	Labour	Resignation
St John's	17 December 1992	Simon McDonald	Labour	Fiona Brocklesby	Labour	Resignation
Highgate	15 October 1992	John Wakeham	Labour	Deborah Sacks	Labour	Resignation
West End	15 October 1992	Julia Devote	Labour	David Lines	Labour	Resignation
Somers Town	7 May 1992	Alfred Saunders	Labour	Robert W. Churchill	Labour	Death
Swiss Cottage	7 May 1992	Vaughan Emsley	Conservative	Peter J. Skolar	Conservative	Resignation

By elections 1986–1990
Ward	Date	Incumbent	Party	Winner	Party	Cause
Hampstead Town	26 January 1989	Selina Gee	Conservative	Rita Pomfret	Conservative	Resignation
St Pancras	1988	Stephen Bevington	Labour	Mary Helsdon	Labour	Resignation
Adelaide	23 July 1987	Stephen Moon	Conservative	Robert Graham	Conservative	Resignation
Somers Town	7 May 1987	Thomas Devine	Labour	Caroline Holding	Labour	Death

By elections 1982–1986
Ward	Date	Incumbent	Party	Winner	Party	Cause
Regent's Park	28 February 1985	John Mills	Labour	Stephen Bevington	Labour	Resignation
Chalk Farm	23 February 1984	Teresa Ryan	Labour	Richard Stein	Labour	Resignation
Swiss Cottage	21 July 1983	Derek Spencer	Conservative	Robert Graham	Conservative	Resignation

By elections 1978–1982
Ward	Date	Incumbent	Party	Winner	Party	Cause
King's Cross	7 May 1981	Roderick Cordara	Labour	Barbara Hughes	Labour	Resignation
West End	7 May 1981	Kevin Gould	Labour	Sandra Wynn	Labour	Resignation
Chalk Farm	27 November 1980	Jonathan Sofer	Labour	Hamish McGibbon	Labour	Resignation
Grafton	30 October 1980	Christopher Gardiner	Labour	William Birtles	Labour	Resignation
Belsize	17 April 1980	Anthony Beaton	Conservative	Cathleen Mainds	Conservative	Resignation
St Pancras	17 April 1980	Michael Morrissey	Labour	Jennifer Willmot	Labour	Resignation
Adelaide	3 May 1979	Donald Degerdon	Conservative	Ian Pasley-Taylor	Conservative	Death
Swiss Cottage	3 May 1979	Brian Stoner	Conservative	Ronald Rees	Conservative	Resignation

By elections 1974–1978
Ward	Date	Incumbent	Party	Winner	Party	Cause
Swiss Cottage	20 October 1977	Ronald Raymond-Cox	Conservative	Michael C. Brahams	Conservative	Resignation
Holborn	27 January 1977	Frank Dobson	Labour	Kenneth J. Avery	Conservative	Resignation
St Pancras	27 January 1977	John Toomey	Labour	Thomas J. Devine	Labour	Resignation
Hampstead Town	15 July 1976	Archie MacDonald	Conservative	Stephen R. Rowlinson	Conservative	Resignation
Belsize	25 March 1976	Richard Arthur	Labour	Martin Morton	Conservative	Resignation
Gospel Oak	25 March 1976	Brian Loughran	Labour	Richard W. Turner	Labour	Resignation

By elections 1971–1974
Ward	Date	Incumbent	Party	Winner	Party	Cause
Grafton	7 June 1973	John Needham	Labour	Christopher Gardiner	Labour	Resignation
Gospel Oak	15 June 1972	John Keohane	Labour	Edwin Rhodes	Labour	Death
Swiss Cottage	2 March 1972	John Eidenow	Labour	Neil McIntosh	Labour	Resignation

By elections 1968–1971
Ward	Date	Incumbent	Party	Winner	Party	Cause
Holborn	12 March 1970	Alan Greengross	Conservative	Betty Grass	Labour	Resignation
Highgate	4 December 1969	Peter Brooke	Conservative	Harriet Greenway	Conservative	Resignation
Kilburn	5 December 1968	Jonny Johnson	Labour	David Offenbach	Labour	Death

By elections 1964–1968
Ward	Date	Incumbent	Party	Winner	Party	Cause
Chalk Farm	14 December 1967	Hilda Chandler	Labour	Peter Moloney	Conservative	Resignation
Gospel Oak	1 December 1966	Alexander Sullivan	Labour	Hamish McGibbon	Labour	Resignation
St John's	1 December 1966	Richard Lowe	Labour	Corin Hughes Stanton	Labour	Resignation
St Pancras	1 December 1966	Sidney Munn	Labour	Wendy Mantle	Labour	Death

== Aldermen ==
Aldermen were elected by the council, not the electorate, and had full voting rights. Each council included aldermen, to a maximum of one sixth of the councillors. The Local Government Act 1972 abolished Aldermen with voting rights with effect from 1978 in the London borough councils. Since 1978, the title has been used in an honorary capacity.

=== 1964–1968 ===
Alderman	Party
Ruth Howe	Labour
Michael Cendrowicz	Labour
Ivy Tate	Labour
Lena Townsend	Conservative
Edward Bowman	Conservative
Frank Bennett	Labour
Lyndal Evans	Labour
James MacGibbon	Labour
George King	Labour
Ernest Wistrich	Labour

=== 1968–1971 ===
Alderman	Party
Frank Bennett	Labour
Lyndal Evans	Labour
Millie Miller	Labour
Cliff Tucker	Labour
Ernest Wistrich	Labour
Edward Bowman	Conservative
Luigi Denza	Conservative
Kenneth Furness (replaced by Alan Greengross in 1970)	Conservative
Elaine Kellett	Conservative
Martin Morton	Conservative

=== 1971–1974 ===
Alderman	Party
Leila Campbell	Labour
Samuel Fisher	Labour
Ruth Howe	Labour
Roger Jowell	Labour
Albert (Jock) Stallard	Labour
Edward Bowman	Conservative
Clare Mansel	Conservative
Alan Greengross	Conservative
Elaine Kellett	Conservative
Martin Morton	Conservative

=== 1974–1978 ===
Alderman	Party
Leila Campbell	Labour
Samuel Fisher	Labour
Ruth Howe	Labour
Roger Jowell	Labour
Albert (Jock) Stallard	Labour
William Oakshott (replaced by Wally Burgess in 1975)	Labour
William Budd	Labour
George Trevelyan	Labour
Arthur Soutter	Labour
Gurmukh Singh	Labour

=== Honorary Aldermen ===
Since 1978, the title has been used in an honorary capacity and enables the holder to attend civic events and walk ahead of councillors at the annual Remembrance Day parade. The title has been awarded to former councillors, including:

- Roy Shaw (awarded in 2007, the borough's first Honorary Alderman, for 51 years of unbroken service in the Metropolitan Borough of Hampstead, Metropolitan Borough of St Pancras and on Camden Council)
- Flick Rea (awarded in 2022, for the longest continuous service, 35 years, as a Liberal Democrat councillor, the party's first honorary alderman)
- Roger Robinson (awarded in 2022, served as a Labour councillor for 38 years, the longest on record for any councillor)
