= 2026 Camden London Borough Council election =

2026 English local government election

- 7 May 2026

All 55 seats to Camden London Borough Council 28 seats needed for a majority

| | First party | Second party |
|---|---|---|
| Leader | Richard Olszewski | Lorna Jane Russell |
| Party | Labour | Green |
| Leader since | 22 July 2024 | 30 November 2023 |
| Leader's seat | Holborn and Covent Garden (Note: He was the councilor from Fortune Green before the election, however he stood in Holborn and Covent Garden in 2026 but was defeated) | Highgate |
| Last election | 47 seats, 56.6% | 1 seat, 5.1% |
| Seats before | 45 | 1 |
| Seats won | 30 | 11 |
| Seat change | ▼17 | ▲10 |
| Popular vote | 52,281 | 43,206 |
| Percentage | 32.8% | 27.1% |
| Swing | ▼23.8pp | ▲22.0pp |
| | Third party | Fourth party |
| Leader | Tom Simon | Steve Adams |
| Party | Liberal Democrats | Conservative |
| Leader since | 13 May 2022 | 7 May 2024 |
| Leader's seat | Belsize | Frognal |
| Last election | 4 seats, 17.6% | 3 seats, 19.2% |
| Seats before | 6 | 3 |
| Seats won | 10 | 3 |
| Seat change | ▲6 | Steady |
| Popular vote | 23,617 | 22,423 |
| Percentage | 14.8% | 14.1% |
| Swing | ▼2.8pp | ▼5.1pp |
- Map showing the results of the 2026 Camden London Borough Council election

- Council composition after the election. Labour: 30 seats Green: 11 seats Liberal Democrats: 10 seats Conservative: 3 seats Camden People’s Alliance: 1 seat
Leader before election
Richard Olszewski
Labour
Leader after election
Sagal Abdi-Wali
Labour

The 2026 Camden London Borough Council election took place on 7 May 2026, as part of the 2026 United Kingdom local elections. All 55 members of Camden London Borough Council were elected. The election took place alongside local elections in the other London boroughs.

Prior to the election, the council was under Labour majority control. Labour lost a third of its seats at this election, but narrowly retained its majority on the council. One of those who lost their seat was the incumbent leader of the council, Richard Olszewski. After the election, Labour chose Sagal Abdi-Wali to be its new group leader. She was formally confirmed as the new leader of the council at the subsequent annual council meeting on 20 May 2026.

== Background ==
Result of the 2022 council election

The thirty-two London boroughs were established in 1965 by the London Government Act 1963. They are the principal authorities in Greater London and have responsibilities including education, housing, planning, highways, social services, libraries, recreation, waste, environmental health and revenue collection. Some of the powers are shared with the Greater London Authority, which also manages passenger transport, police and fire.

Since its formation, Camden has variously been under Labour control, no overall control and Conservative control. Only Labour, Conservative, Liberal Democrat and Green councillors have been elected to the council. The council has had an overall Labour majority since the 2010 election; the most recent election in 2022 saw Labour win 47 seats with 56.6% of the overall vote. The Liberal Democrats won four seats with 17.6% of the vote, the Conservatives won three seats with 19.2% of the vote, and the Greens won one seat with 5.1% of the vote. The incumbent leader of the council was the Labour councillor Richard Olszewski, who held that position from 2024 until his defeat at this election to the Green Party.

== Electoral process ==
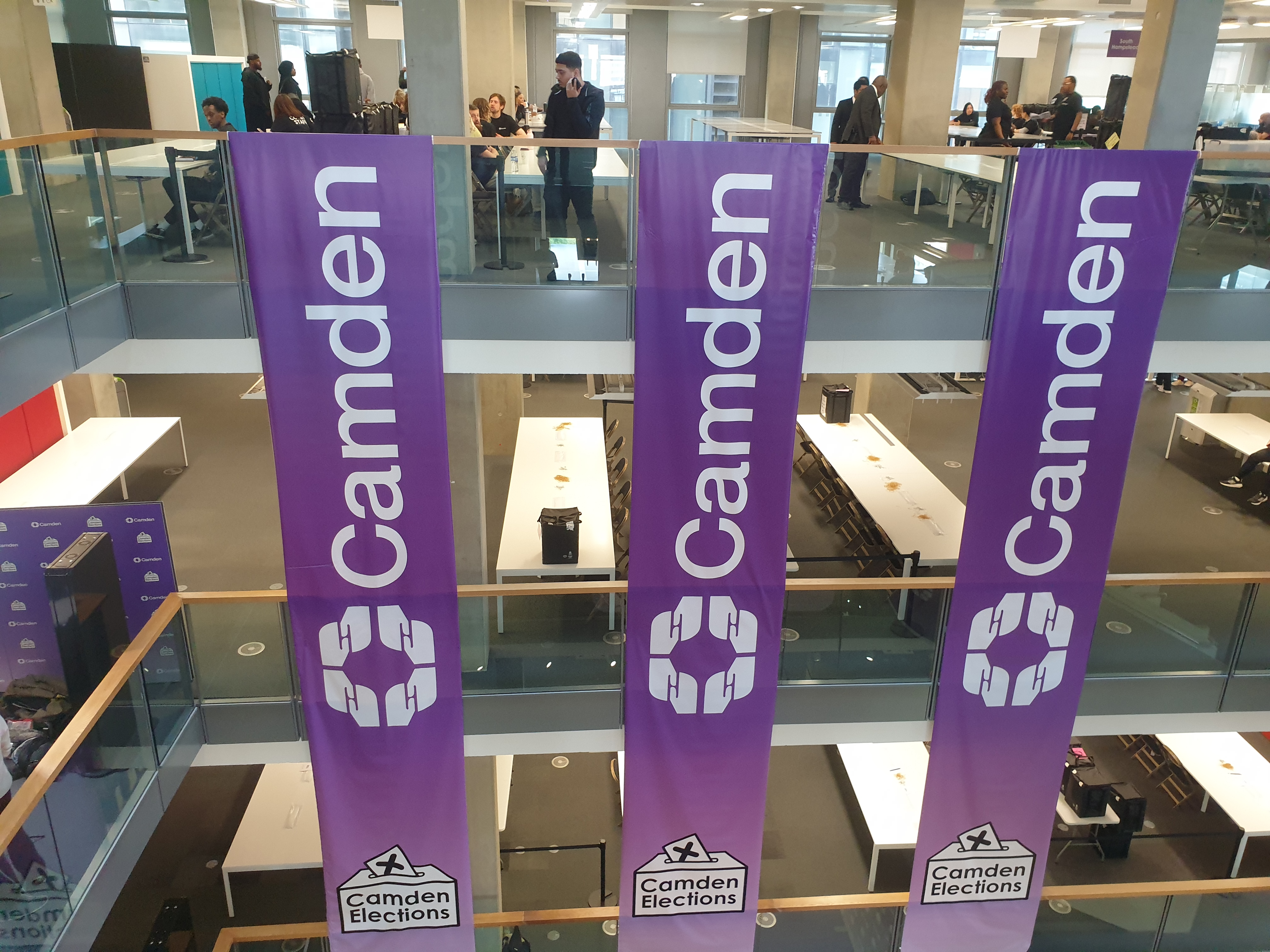
The central space at the Camden Council offices bedecked in banners for the May 2026 Camden elections count on 8 May 2026

Camden, as is the case with all other London borough councils, elects all of its councillors at once every four years, with the previous election having taken place in 2022. The election takes place by multi-member first-past-the-post voting, with each ward being represented by two or three councillors. Electors will have as many votes as there are councillors to be elected in their ward, with the top two or three being elected.

All registered electors (British, Irish, Commonwealth and European Union citizens) living in London aged 18 or over are entitled to vote in the election. People who live at two addresses in different councils, such as university students with different term-time and holiday addresses, are entitled to be registered for and vote in elections in both local authorities. Voting in-person at polling stations takes place from 7:00 to 22:00 on election day, and voters are able to apply for postal votes or proxy votes in advance of the election.

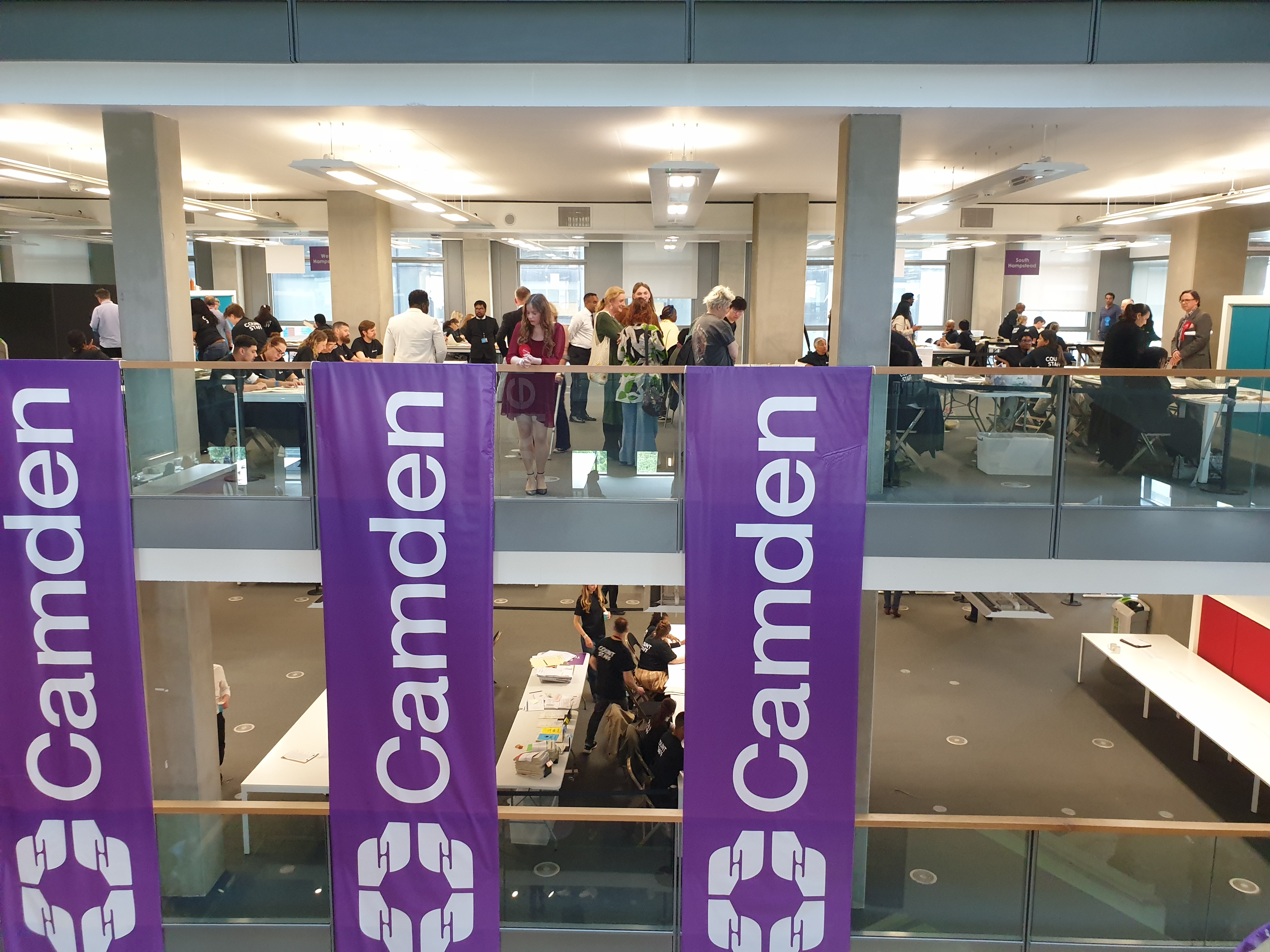
Two floors of activity at the May 2026 Camden council election count

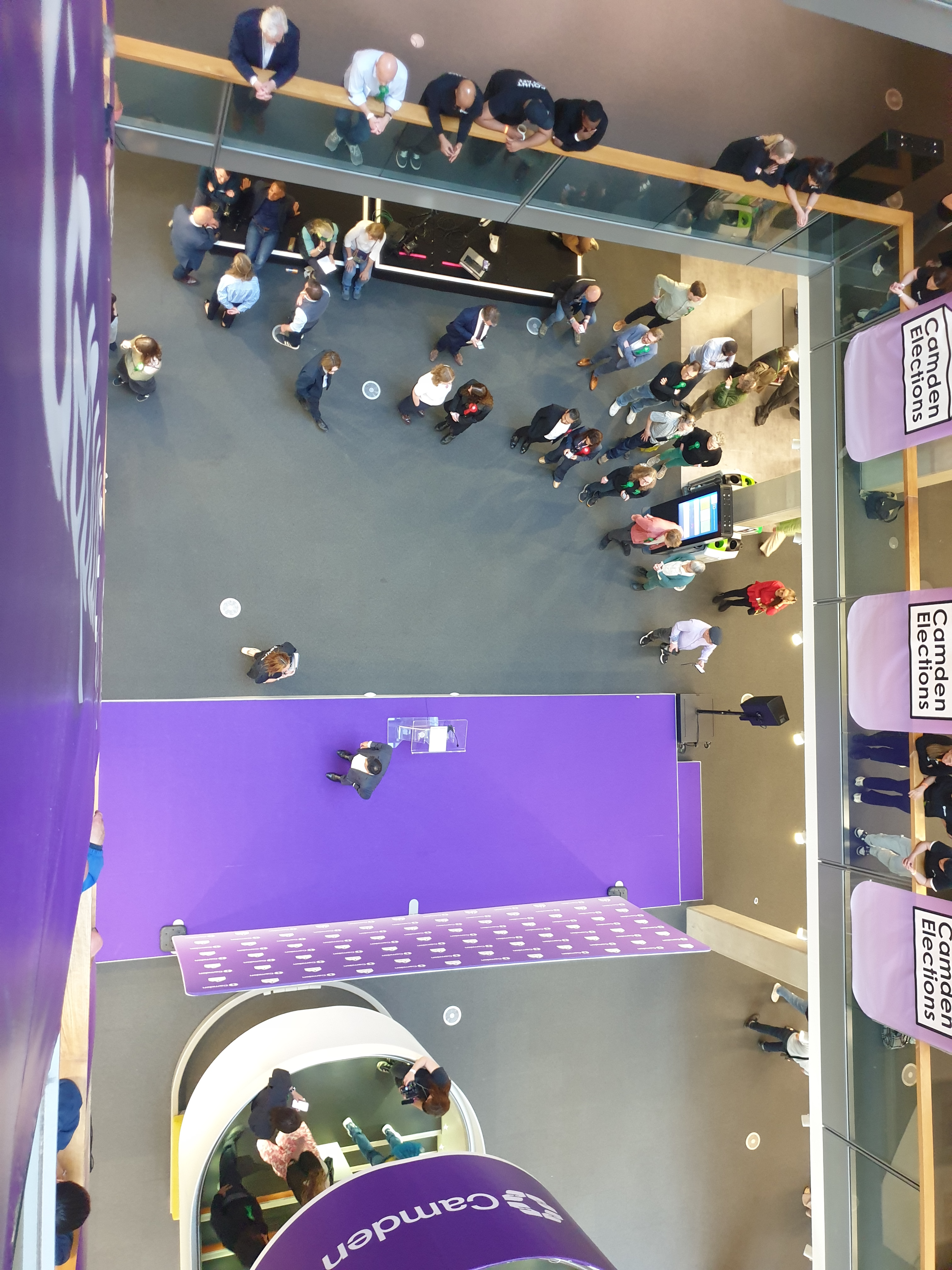
Looking down three floors on the declaration stage for the May 2026 Camden elections

== Council composition ==
| After 2022 election | | Before 2026 election | |
| Party | Seats | Party | Seats |
|---|---|---|---|
| Labour | 47 | Labour | 44 |
| Liberal Democrats | 4 | Liberal Democrats | 6 |
| Conservative | 3 | Conservative | 3 |
| Green | 1 | Green | 1 |
| Independent | 0 | Independent | 1 |

Changes 2022–2026:

- May 2022: Adrian Cohen (Labour) resigns – by-election held July 2022
- July 2022: Linda Chung (Liberal Democrats) gains by-election from Labour
- April 2023: Will Prince (Labour) resigns – by-election held June 2023
- June 2023: Tommy Gale (Labour) wins by-election
- October 2023: Siân Berry (Green) resigns – by-election held November 2023
- November 2023: Lorna Russell (Green) wins by-election
- March 2024: Gio Spinella (Conservative) resigns – by-election held May 2024
- May 2024: Steve Adams (Conservative) wins by-election
- July 2024: Danny Beales (Labour), Georgia Gould (Labour), and Lloyd Hatton (Labour) resign – by-elections held September 2024
- September 2024: Joseph Ball (Labour), Tricia Leman (Labour), and Robert Thompson (Labour) win by-elections
- March 2025: Shiva Tiwari (Labour) joins Conservatives
- July 2025: Shiva Tiwari (Conservative) resigns – by-election held August 2025
- August 2025: Janet Grauberg (Liberal Democrats) gains by-election from Labour
- April 2026: Sue Vincent (Labour) leaves party to sit as an independent

== Election results ==
=== Election result ===
2026 Camden London Borough Council election
| Party | Candidates | Seats | Gains | Losses | Net gain/loss | Seats % | Votes % | Votes | +/− |
|---|---|---|---|---|---|---|---|---|---|
| Labour | 55 | 30 | | | ▼17 | 54.54 | 32.84 | 52,281 | |
| Green | 49 | 11 | | | ▲10 | 20.00 | 27.14 | 43,206 | |
| Liberal Democrats | 55 | 10 | | | ▲6 | 18.19 | 14.83 | 23,617 | |
| Conservative | 55 | 3 | | | Steady | 5.45 | 14.08 | 22,423 | |
| Camden People's Alliance | 6 | 1 | | | ▲1 | 1.82 | 3.15 | 5,007 | |
| Reform | 44 | 0 | | | Steady | 0.00 | 7.51 | 11,950 | |
| Independent | 3 | 0 | | | Steady | 0.00 | 0.34 | 545 | |
| National Housing Party | 3 | 0 | | | Steady | 0.00 | 0.11 | 171 | |

== Ward results ==
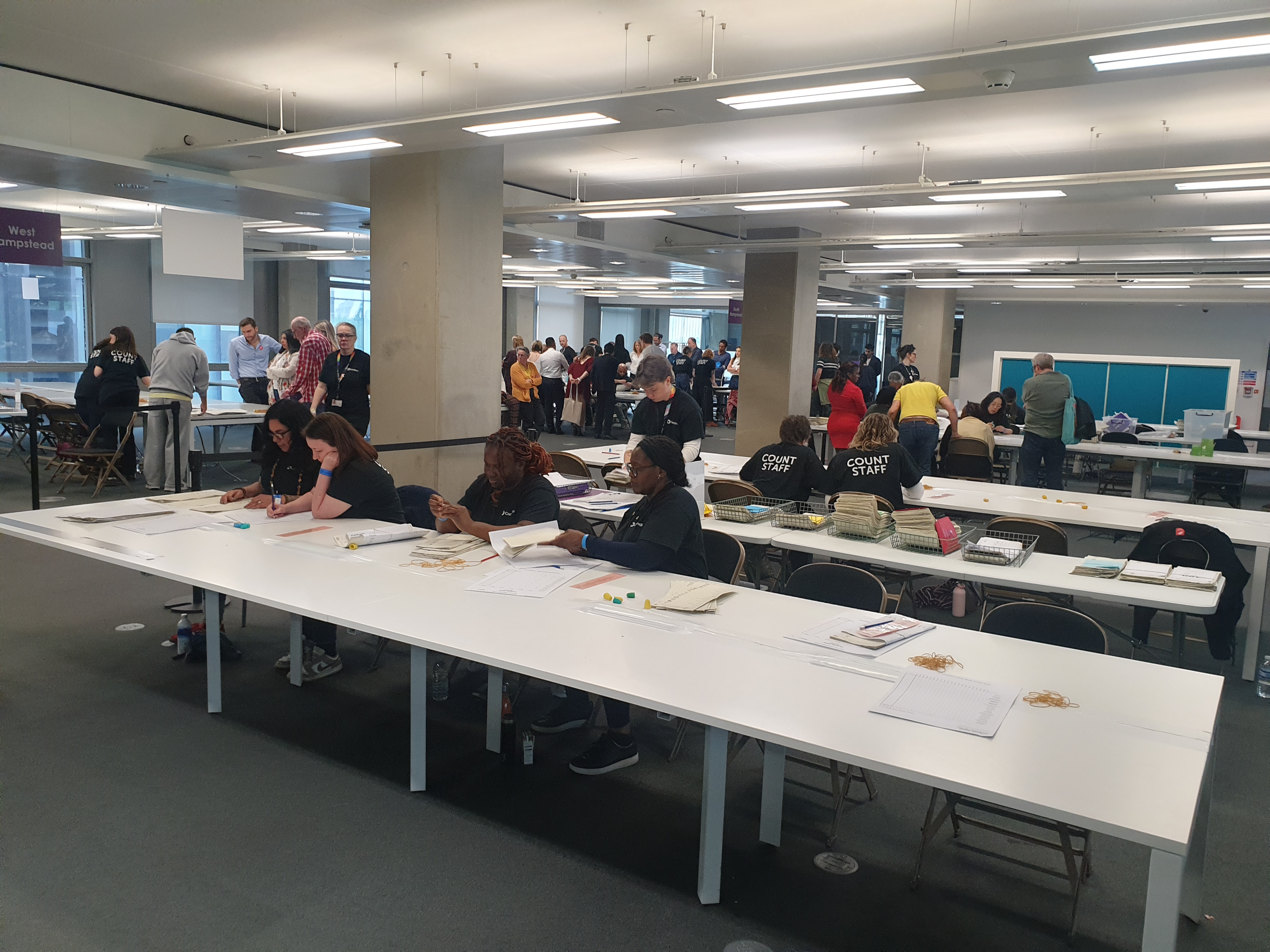
Counting the results in Kilburn, South Hampstead and West Hampstead wards

List of candidates:

=== Belsize ===
Belsize (3 seats)
| Party | Candidate | Votes | % | ±% |
|---|---|---|---|---|
| Liberal Democrats | Judy Dixey* | 1,191 | 35.7 | |
| Liberal Democrats | Tom Simon* | 1,162 | 34.8 | |
| Liberal Democrats | Matthew Kirk* | 1,132 | 33.9 | |
| Conservative | Alexander Donnelly | 1,028 | 30.8 | |
| Conservative | Peter Horne | 949 | 28.4 | |
| Conservative | Shelley Rubinstein | 949 | 28.4 | |
| Green | Stefano Casalotti | 548 | 16.4 | |
| Labour | Dan Bilenga | 488 | 14.6 | |
| Labour | Tamsin Mitchell | 488 | 14.6 | |
| Green | Jessica Noske-Turner | 468 | 14.0 | |
| Labour | Neville McKay | 464 | 13.9 | |
| Green | Bobby Raj | 393 | 11.8 | |
| Reform | Joycelyn Buffouge | 261 | 7.8 | |
| Reform | Coren Lass | 261 | 7.8 | |
| Reform | Candice McElroy | 236 | 7.1 | |
| Turnout | | | 39.21 | +0.81 |
| Liberal Democrats hold | | Swing | | |
| Liberal Democrats hold | | Swing | | |
| Liberal Democrats hold | | Swing | | |

=== Bloomsbury ===
Bloomsbury (3 seats)
| Party | Candidate | Votes | % | ±% |
|---|---|---|---|---|
| Labour | Sabrina Francis* | 910 | 40.2 | |
| Labour | Adam Harrison | 886 | 39.1 | |
| Green | Lilac Carr | 846 | 37.4 | |
| Labour | Rishi Madlani* | 827 | 36.5 | |
| Green | Matthew Parsfield | 817 | 36.1 | |
| Green | Volodymyr Lukyanov | 763 | 33.7 | |
| Conservative | William Frost | 266 | 11.7 | |
| Reform | Christopher Cooke | 251 | 11.1 | |
| Reform | Richard Samuel | 241 | 10.6 | |
| Conservative | Stuart Leach | 236 | 10.4 | |
| Liberal Democrats | Katie Cooke | 198 | 8.7 | |
| Liberal Democrats | Jonathan Lewin | 198 | 8.7 | |
| Conservative | Paul Bhangal | 181 | 8.0 | |
| Liberal Democrats | Kenneth Barnett | 172 | 7.6 | |
| Turnout | | | 33.76 | +3.56 |
| Labour hold | | Swing | | |
| Labour hold | | Swing | | |
| Green gain from Labour | | Swing | | |

=== Camden Square ===
Camden Square (2 seats)
| Party | Candidate | Votes | % | ±% |
|---|---|---|---|---|
| Labour | Sagal Abdi-Wali* | 890 | 42.3 | |
| Labour | Tricia Leman | 848 | 40.3 | |
| Green | Helen Doyle | 830 | 39.4 | |
| Green | Adam Haswell | 687 | 32.6 | |
| Liberal Democrats | Benjamin Newman | 164 | 7.8 | |
| Independent | Michael Britton | 162 | 7.7 | |
| Reform | Oliver Pearce | 162 | 7.7 | |
| Reform | Juan Ojeda-Sanchez | 151 | 7.2 | |
| Conservative | Roger Freeman | 119 | 5.7 | |
| Liberal Democrats | Samel Tomas | 106 | 5.0 | |
| Conservative | Jamie Webb | 93 | 4.4 | |
| Turnout | | | 36.89 | +5.09 |
| Labour hold | | Swing | | |
| Labour hold | | Swing | | |

=== Camden Town ===
Camden Town (2 seats)
| Party | Candidate | Votes | % | ±% |
|---|---|---|---|---|
| Labour | Pat Callaghan* | 746 | | |
| Labour | Matt Cooper | 620 | | |
| Green | Peter Goldsmith | 583 | | |
| Green | Philip Nelson | 544 | | |
| Reform | David Haig | 142 | | |
| Conservative | James Kafton | 113 | | |
| Liberal Democrats | Ekaterina Kirk | 111 | | |
| Conservative | Susan Lee | 109 | | |
| Reform | Vedamsh Vaidya | 96 | | |
| Liberal Democrats | Rafe Offer | 84 | | |
| Turnout | | | 32.42 | +3.22 |
| Labour hold | | Swing | | |
| Labour hold | | Swing | | |

=== Fortune Green ===
Fortune Green (3 seats)
| Party | Candidate | Votes | % | ±% |
|---|---|---|---|---|
| Liberal Democrats | Nancy Jirira* | 1,376 | | |
| Liberal Democrats | William Coles | 1,199 | | |
| Liberal Democrats | Farrell Monk | 1,151 | | |
| Green | Erin Carlson | 847 | | |
| Labour | Katie Clark | 746 | | |
| Labour | Kasia Kramer | 646 | | |
| Green | Bruno Leipold | 632 | | |
| Labour | Matthew Houlsby | 623 | | |
| Green | Corne Verster | 564 | | |
| Conservative | Ian Cohen | 481 | | |
| Conservative | David Brierley | 405 | | |
| Conservative | Dominic Parker | 328 | | |
| Reform | Wendy Taylor | 266 | | |
| Reform | Zachary Ilunga | 248 | | |
| Turnout | | | 37.48 | +0.28 |
| Liberal Democrats hold | | Swing | | |
| Liberal Democrats gain from Labour | | Swing | | |
| Liberal Democrats gain from Labour | | Swing | | |

=== Frognal ===
Frognal (2 seats)
| Party | Candidate | Votes | % | ±% |
|---|---|---|---|---|
| Conservative | Steven Adams* | 1,034 | | |
| Conservative | Juliette Graham | 933 | | |
| Green | Charles Harris | 361 | | |
| Labour | Jack Leader | 355 | | |
| Labour | Willow Parker | 342 | | |
| Green | Catherine Keshishian | 339 | | |
| Reform | Marx De Morais | 253 | | |
| Liberal Democrats | Reetendra Banerji | 243 | | |
| Liberal Democrats | Valdir Francisco | 236 | | |
| Reform | Thomas Sterling | 233 | | |
| Turnout | | | 39.06 | +5.16 |
| Conservative hold | | Swing | | |
| Conservative hold | | Swing | | |

=== Gospel Oak ===
Gospel Oak (3 seats)
| Party | Candidate | Votes | % | ±% |
|---|---|---|---|---|
| Green | Richard Atkins | 1,240 | | |
| Labour | Marcus Boyland* | 1,208 | | |
| Labour | Larraine Revah* | 1,192 | | |
| Green | Andrea Paramananthan | 1,165 | | |
| Green | Rob Reeves | 1,137 | | |
| Labour | Matthew Sudlow | 1,100 | | |
| Reform | Alan Drummond | 444 | | |
| Reform | Lindsey Mitchell | 425 | | |
| Reform | David Moore | 420 | | |
| Liberal Democrats | Margaret Jackson-Roberts | 360 | | |
| Liberal Democrats | James Bowen | 350 | | |
| Conservative | Peter Straker | 343 | | |
| Conservative | Raphaël Link-Gurprasad | 319 | | |
| Conservative | Saed Mohamed | 279 | | |
| Liberal Democrats | Sunil Hiranandani | 247 | | |
| Turnout | | | 39.18 | +5.68 |
| Green gain from Labour | | Swing | | |
| Labour hold | | Swing | | |
| Labour hold | | Swing | | |

=== Hampstead Town ===
Hampstead Town (2 seats)
| Party | Candidate | Votes | % | ±% |
|---|---|---|---|---|
| Liberal Democrats | Linda Chung* | 1,221 | | |
| Conservative | Stephen Stark* | 1,069 | | |
| Liberal Democrats | Aimery Roquefort | 960 | | |
| Conservative | Amanda Sefton | 814 | | |
| Labour | Anna Burrage | 492 | | |
| Green | Laura Rohde | 388 | | |
| Green | Justin Hoffman | 333 | | |
| Labour | Michael Williams | 320 | | |
| Reform | Laura Phillips | 190 | | |
| Turnout | | | 48.14 | +4.84 |
| Liberal Democrats hold | | Swing | | |
| Conservative hold | | Swing | | |

=== Haverstock ===
Haverstock (3 seats)
| Party | Candidate | Votes | % | ±% |
|---|---|---|---|---|
| Labour | Kemi Atolagbe* | 1,366 | | |
| Labour | Rebecca Filer* | 1,322 | | |
| Labour | Nasrine Djemai* | 1,255 | | |
| Green | Mohamed Farah | 1,209 | | |
| Green | Andrej Mecava | 1,117 | | |
| Green | Aziz Hakimi | 1,034 | | |
| Liberal Democrats | Katharine Burge | 351 | | |
| Conservative | Josh Mackenzie-Lawrie | 320 | | |
| Conservative | John Webber | 319 | | |
| Reform | Robert Wheater | 313 | | |
| Reform | Aindrias Ōh-Ēineagāin | 300 | | |
| Conservative | Alex Williams | 298 | | |
| Liberal Democrats | Joseph Tobin | 259 | | |
| Liberal Democrats | Alidad Moaveni | 220 | | |
| Turnout | | | 37.99 | +6.69 |
| Labour hold | | Swing | | |
| Labour hold | | Swing | | |
| Labour hold | | Swing | | |

=== Highgate ===
Highgate (3 seats)
| Party | Candidate | Votes | % | ±% |
|---|---|---|---|---|
| Green | Lorna Jane Russell* | 1,908 | | |
| Labour | Camron Aref-Adib* | 1,815 | | |
| Labour | Anna Wright* | 1,810 | | |
| Green | Alice Brown | 1,612 | | |
| Green | James Dicker | 1,352 | | |
| Labour | John Carr | 1,253 | | |
| Conservative | Judith Barnes | 522 | | |
| Conservative | Will Finn | 494 | | |
| Conservative | Johnny Chapman | 425 | | |
| Reform | Ben Brook | 342 | | |
| Liberal Democrats | Henry Potts | 250 | | |
| Liberal Democrats | Mark Finney | 205 | | |
| Liberal Democrats | Munro Price | 184 | | |
| Turnout | | | 52.65 | +3.65 |
| Green hold | | Swing | | |
| Labour hold | | Swing | | |
| Labour hold | | Swing | | |

=== Holborn and Covent Garden ===
Holborn and Covent Garden (3 seats)
| Party | Candidate | Votes | % | ±% |
|---|---|---|---|---|
| Green | Hamza Chowdhury | 1,271 | | |
| Green | Jim Monahan | 1,176 | | |
| Green | James White | 1,144 | | |
| Labour | Julian Fulbrook* | 1,035 | | |
| Labour | Livia Paggi | 848 | | |
| Labour | Richard Olszewski | 749 | | |
| Reform | Michael Kane | 309 | | |
| Reform | Jack Nott-Bower | 302 | | |
| Reform | Atlan Dervish | 263 | | |
| Conservative | Alison Frost | 248 | | |
| Conservative | Tim Frost | 220 | | |
| NHPUK | Patrick McGinnis | 217 | 2.5 | |
| Conservative | Keith Sedgwick | 189 | | |
| Liberal Democrats | Charlotte O’Brien | 185 | | |
| Liberal Democrats | Stephen Barabas | 182 | | |
| NHPUK | Mark Furnell | 166 | | |
| Liberal Democrats | Erich Wagner | 132 | | |
| Rejected ballots | | 19 | | |
| Turnout | | | 37.4 | +4.5 |
| Green gain from Labour | | Swing | | |
| Green gain from Labour | | Swing | | |
| Green gain from Labour | | Swing | | |

=== Kentish Town North ===
Kentish Town North (2 seats)
| Party | Candidate | Votes | % | ±% |
|---|---|---|---|---|
| Labour Co-op | Sylvia McNamara* | 1,367 | | |
| Labour Co-op | James Slater* | 1,351 | | |
| Green | Brigitte Ascher | 1,163 | | |
| Green | Hannah Morris | 1,129 | | |
| Reform | Claire Mortimer | 141 | | |
| Reform | Colin Rennie | 137 | | |
| Conservative | Darryl Davies | 124 | | |
| Conservative | Richard Merrin | 109 | | |
| Liberal Democrats | Roger Pillai | 84 | | |
| Liberal Democrats | Rex Shackle | 72 | | |
| Rejected ballots | | 7 | | |
| Turnout | | | 49.59 | +9.3 |
| Labour Co-op hold | | Swing | | |
| Labour Co-op hold | | Swing | | |

=== Kentish Town South ===
Kentish Town South (3 seats)
| Party | Candidate | Votes | % | ±% |
|---|---|---|---|---|
| Labour | Meriç Apak* | 1,441 | | |
| Labour | Joseph Ball* | 1,425 | | |
| Labour | Annabelle Williams | 1,320 | | |
| Green | Pete Hutchings | 1,278 | | |
| Green | Ashoka Phillips | 1,209 | | |
| Green | Kai Nixon | 1,198 | | |
| Reform | Genieve Laidman | 272 | | |
| Reform | George Spencer | 268 | | |
| Conservative | Robert Brittain | 219 | | |
| Liberal Democrats | Stacey Offer | 171 | | |
| Conservative | Robert Ricketts | 161 | | |
| Liberal Democrats | Joseph Macdonogh | 155 | | |
| Conservative | Devin Kohli | 147 | | |
| Liberal Democrats | Hinne Tuinstra | 124 | | |
| Rejected ballots | | 12 | | |
| Turnout | | | 41.26 | +24.91 |
| Labour hold | | Swing | | |
| Labour hold | | Swing | | |
| Labour hold | | Swing | | |

=== Kilburn ===
Kilburn (3 seats)
| Party | Candidate | Votes | % | ±% |
|---|---|---|---|---|
| Labour | Eddie Hanson* | 970 | | |
| Green | Ash Atkinson | 954 | | |
| Green | Andre Lopez-Turner | 880 | | |
| Labour | Robert Thompson* | 828 | | |
| Green | Mukhtar Moalin | 795 | | |
| Labour | Nanouche Umeadi* | 732 | | |
| Conservative | Ben Storrs | 307 | | |
| Conservative | Rahoul Bhansali | 293 | | |
| Reform | Andrew Preston | 292 | | |
| Conservative | Carole Ricketts | 278 | | |
| Reform | Mac Harwood | 269 | | |
| Liberal Democrats | Tracey Shackle | 261 | | |
| Liberal Democrats | Hamir Patel | 220 | | |
| Liberal Democrats | Daviyan Kothari | 208 | | |
| Turnout | | | 30.44% | |
| Labour hold | | Swing | | |
| Green gain from Labour | | Swing | | |
| Green gain from Labour | | Swing | | |

=== King's Cross ===
King's Cross (3 seats)
| Party | Candidate | Votes | % | ±% |
|---|---|---|---|---|
| Labour | Lotis Bautista* | 1,048 | 45.3 | |
| Labour | Jonathan Simpson | 995 | 43.0 | |
| Labour | Liam Martin-Lane* | 979 | 42.3 | |
| CPA | Joel Anderson | 778 | 33.6 | |
| CPA | Shezan Renny | 694 | 30.0 | |
| CPA | Paul Renny | 687 | 29.7 | |
| Liberal Democrats | Joan Baktis | 236 | 10.2 | |
| Reform | Andre Cowell-Berry | 224 | 9.7 | |
| Conservative | Cat Frost | 224 | 9.7 | |
| Liberal Democrats | Elizabeth Pearson | 218 | 9.4 | |
| Reform | Anthony Hegarty | 212 | 9.2 | |
| Liberal Democrats | Derek McAuley | 204 | 8.8 | |
| Conservative | Robyn Gardner | 194 | 8.4 | |
| Conservative | Tom Hatton | 186 | 8.0 | |
| NHPUK | Luke McCarthy | 60 | 2.59 | |
| Turnout | | | | |

=== Primrose Hill ===
Primrose Hill (3 seats)
| Party | Candidate | Votes | % | ±% |
|---|---|---|---|---|
| Labour | Dan Corby | 1,209 | 35.9 | |
| Labour | Lauren Keiles | 1,196 | 35.6 | |
| Labour | Suleiman Osman | 1,013 | 30.1 | |
| Conservative | Esmeralda Akpoke | 977 | 29.0 | |
| Conservative | Paul Tavares | 956 | 28.4 | |
| Conservative | Shajib Ziffer | 794 | 23.6 | |
| Green | Tom Ash | 785 | 23.3 | |
| Green | Helen Tindale | 749 | 22.3 | |
| Green | Matthew Wrigley | 621 | 18.5 | |
| Reform | David Flatley | 340 | 10.1 | |
| Liberal Democrats | Catherine Hays | 328 | 9.8 | |
| Reform | Nik Lodenos | 292 | 8.7 | |
| Reform | Nicholas Theodorou | 290 | 8.6 | |
| Liberal Democrats | Lawrence Nicholson | 289 | 8.6 | |
| Liberal Democrats | Lenka Fekulova | 251 | 7.5 | |
| Turnout | | | | |

=== Regent's Park ===
Regent's Park (3 seats)
| Party | Candidate | Votes | % | ±% |
|---|---|---|---|---|
| Green | Victoria Mery | 1,138 | | |
| Green | Muhammed Naser | 1,054 | | |
| Green | Ruman Jaigirdar | 1,010 | | |
| Labour | Nasim Ali* | 973 | | |
| Labour | Heather Johnson* | 929 | | |
| Labour | Nadia Shah | 905 | | |
| Reform | Sean Fairbrother | 354 | | |
| Reform | Dean Goldenberg | 331 | | |
| Reform | Beverley Martin | 321 | | |
| Conservative | Martin Sheppard | 274 | | |
| Conservative | Vladimir Chorniy | 262 | | |
| Conservative | Alexandra Marsanu | 240 | | |
| Liberal Democrats | Christopher Gayford | 189 | | |
| Liberal Democrats | Mary Stainer | 170 | | |
| Liberal Democrats | Farhan Islam | 113 | | |
| NHPUK | Jose Fafian | 46 | | |
| Turnout | | | | |

Naser won election, but was ineligible to be a councillor by virtue of being a teacher at a Camden secondary school.

=== South Hampstead ===
South Hampstead (3 seats)
| Party | Candidate | Votes | % | ±% |
|---|---|---|---|---|
| Labour | Izzy Lenga* | 1,006 | | |
| Labour | Francesca Reynolds | 930 | | |
| Labour | Arun Kumar | 925 | | |
| Conservative | Susan Aykroyd | 816 | | |
| Liberal Democrats | Tara Copeland | 795 | | |
| Green | Andrea Cornwell | 758 | | |
| Green | CJ Jessup | 711 | | |
| Liberal Democrats | Pranay Hariharan | 706 | | |
| Liberal Democrats | Laurence Lodge | 693 | | |
| Conservative | Andy Marsh | 679 | | |
| Conservative | Wakjira Feyesa | 637 | | |
| Green | John Payne | 618 | | |
| Reform | Douglas De Morais | 261 | | |
| Reform | Valerie Moss | 247 | | |
| Turnout | | | | |

=== St Pancras and Somers Town ===
St Pancras and Somers Town (3 seats)
| Party | Candidate | Votes | % | ±% |
|---|---|---|---|---|
| Labour | Samata Khatoon* | 1,092 | | |
| Labour | Shah Miah* | 1,018 | | |
| CPA | Shah Bakth | 999 | | |
| Labour | Edmund Frondigoun* | 978 | | |
| CPA | Sarah Friday | 943 | | |
| CPA | Raqhib Islam | 906 | | |
| Reform | William Bennett | 432 | | |
| Reform | Solomon Gold | 367 | | |
| Reform | Theodore Roth | 366 | | |
| Liberal Democrats | Hannah Billington | 265 | | |
| Liberal Democrats | Stewart Jenkins | 192 | | |
| Liberal Democrats | David Elkan | 191 | | |
| Conservative | Alex Ellis | 188 | | |
| Conservative | David Roberts | 162 | | |
| Conservative | Cosmo Webster | 161 | | |
| NHPUK | Angel Daden | 65 | | |
| Turnout | | | | |

=== West Hampstead ===
West Hampstead (3 seats)
| Party | Candidate | Votes | % | ±% |
|---|---|---|---|---|
| Liberal Democrats | Janet Grauberg* | 1,421 | | |
| Liberal Democrats | Patrick Stillman | 1,164 | | |
| Liberal Democrats | Arti Wadhwani | 1,068 | | |
| Labour | Sharon Hardwick* | 782 | | |
| Green | Jane Walby | 661 | | |
| Labour | Leo Gordon | 629 | | |
| Green | Les Levidow | 601 | | |
| Labour | Tabby Merrison-Galvin | 596 | | |
| Green | Jason Pritchard | 586 | | |
| Conservative | Ewan Cameron | 376 | | |
| Conservative | Jacob Solon | 298 | | |
| Conservative | Aarti Joshi | 268 | | |
| Reform | Eitan Saloniki | 224 | | |
| Reform | Julios Samarxhiu | 201 | | |
| Turnout | | | | |

== By-elections ==
=== Regent's Park ===
Regent's Park by-election: 9 July 2026 Ineligibility of Muhammed Naser (Green)
| Party | Candidate | Votes | % | ±% |
|---|---|---|---|---|
| Labour | Nanouche Umeadi | 576 | 32.4 | |
| Green | Alice Brown | 482 | 27.1 | |
| Independent | Mohammad Khan | 407 | 22.9 | |
| Conservative | Vladimir Chorniy | 137 | 7.7 | |
| Reform | Janet Martin | 123 | 6.9 | |
| Liberal Democrats | Henry Potts | 51 | 2.9 | |
| Turnout | | 1,789 | 21.9 | |
| Rejected ballots | | 13 | | |
| Labour gain from Green | | Swing | | |
