= Camden Town with Primrose Hill (ward) =

Former electoral ward in the London borough of Camden

- Former electoral ward for the Camden London Borough Council
- Camden Town with Primrose Hill ward boundaries from 2002 to 2022
- Borough: Camden
- County: Greater London
- Population: 12,613 (2011)
- Electorate: 8,202 (2002); 9,001 (2018)
- Area: 1.1662 square kilometres (0.4503 sq mi)

Former electoral ward
- Created: 2002
- Abolished: 2022
- Councillors: 3
- Replaced by: Camden Town, Primrose Hill and St Pancras and Somers Town
- ONS code: 00AGGF
- GSS code: E05000130

Camden Town with Primrose Hill was a ward in the London Borough of Camden, in the United Kingdom. The ward was created for the May 2002 local elections. At the 2011 Census the population of the ward was 12,613. The ward was abolished at the 2022 election. Most of its area became part of the newly created Camden Town and Primrose Hill wards, with some areas becoming part of the St Pancras and Somers Town ward.

== List of councillors ==
Term	Councillor	Party
2002–2022	Pat Callaghan	Labour
2002–2006	Harriet Garland	Labour
2002–2002	Justin Barnard	Liberal Democrats
2002–2006	Jake Sumner	Labour
2006–2014	Chris Naylor	Liberal Democrats
2006–2010	Elizabeth Campbell	Liberal Democrats
2010–2014	Thomas Neumark	Labour
2014–2022	Lazzaro Pietragnoli	Labour
2014–2022	Richard Cotton	Labour

== Camden council elections ==
Location of the Camden Town with Primrose Hill ward in Camden

=== 2018 election ===
The election took place on 3 May 2018.

2018 Camden London Borough Council election: Camden Town with Primrose Hill
Party	Candidate	Votes	%	±%
Labour	Pat Callaghan	1,936		
Labour	Richard Cotton	1,664		
Labour	Lazzaro Pietragnoli	1,570		
Conservative	Catherine McQueen	632		
Conservative	Peter Horne	602		
Conservative	Joel Roberts	573		
Liberal Democrats	John Lefley	457		
Green	Rik Howard	434		
Liberal Democrats	Anne Wright	407		
Green	Mark Milaszkiewicz	384		
Liberal Democrats	Lawrence Nicholson	335		
Turnout		9,411	34.86%	
Labour hold		Swing		
Labour hold		Swing		
Labour hold		Swing		

=== 2014 election ===
The election took place on 22 May 2014.

2014 Camden London Borough Council election: Camden Town with Primrose Hill
Party	Candidate	Votes	%	±%
Labour	Pat Callaghan	2,005		
Labour	Lazzaro Pietragnoli	1,608		
Labour	Richard Cotton	1,542		
Conservative	Rory Manley	655		
Green	Nicola Hart	641		
Conservative	Chris Kassapis	609		
Green	Daniel Rosenbaum	601		
Conservative	Richard Merrin	567		
Green	Ben Van Der Velde	455		
Liberal Democrats	Sarah Hoyle	309		
Liberal Democrats	Juniour Blake	295		
Independent	Phil Cowan	287		
Liberal Democrats	Mukul Hira	255		
Turnout		9,847	38.0	
Labour hold		Swing		
Labour gain from Liberal Democrats		Swing		
Labour hold		Swing		

=== 2010 election ===
The election on 6 May 2010 took place on the same day as the United Kingdom general election.

2010 Camden London Borough Council election: Camden Town with Primrose Hill
Party	Candidate	Votes	%	±%
Labour	Pat Callaghan	2,482		
Liberal Democrats	Chris Naylor	1,835		
Labour	Thomas Neumark	1,753		
Labour	Rob Higson	1,742		
Liberal Democrats	Nazia Gofur	1,702		
Liberal Democrats	Chris Richards	1,511		
Conservative	Michael Corby	1,290		
Conservative	Peter Home	1,170		
Conservative	Christos Kassapis	1,059		
Green	Russell Oppenheimer	595		
Green	Pamela Walker	583		
Green	Vincent Thurgood	569		
Independent	Paul Grosvenor	140		
Turnout		16,431	63.3	+21.2
Labour hold		Swing		
Liberal Democrats hold		Swing		
Labour gain from Liberal Democrats		Swing		

=== 2006 election ===
The election took place on 4 May 2006.

2006 Camden London Borough Council election: Camden Town with Primrose Hill
Party	Candidate	Votes	%	±%
Liberal Democrats	Chris Naylor	1,367		
Labour	Pat Callaghan	1,357		
Liberal Democrats	Elizabeth Campbell	1,357		
Liberal Democrats	John Lefley	1,293		
Labour	Jake Sumner	1,186		
Labour	Abdul Quadir	1,152		
Conservative	William Mitchell	527		
Conservative	Jesse Norman	501		
Conservative	Peter Horne	497		
Green	Nicola Chatham	414		
Green	Vincent Thurgood	356		
Green	Hilary Wendt	313		
Turnout		10,320	42.1	
Liberal Democrats gain from Labour		Swing		
Labour hold		Swing		
Liberal Democrats gain from Labour		Swing		

=== 2002 by-election ===
The by-election took place on 20 June 2002, following the resignation of Justin Barnard.

2024 Camden Town with Primrose Hill by-election
Party	Candidate	Votes	%	±%
Labour	Jake Sumner	652	29.0	−1.2
Liberal Democrats	John Lefley	594	26.4	+2.8
Independent	Gloria Lazenby	516	22.9	+5.4
Conservative	Peter Horne	392	17.4	+0.9
Green	Lucy Wills	98	4.4	−6.8
Majority		58	2.6	
Turnout		2,252	27.8	
Labour gain from Liberal Democrats		Swing		

=== 2002 election ===
The election took place on 2 May 2002.

2002 Camden London Borough Council election: Camden Town with Primrose Hill
Party	Candidate	Votes	%	±%
Labour	Pat Callaghan	1,041		
Labour	Harriet Garland	986		
Liberal Democrats	Justin Barnard	812		
Labour	Jake Sumner	782		
Liberal Democrats	John Lefley	653		
Independent	Gloria Lazenby	603		
Liberal Democrats	Toby Wickenden	591		
Conservative	William Mitchell	570		
Conservative	Peter Grosvenor	560		
Conservative	Paul Barton	541		
Green	Danielle Rappaport	385		
Green	Juliana Venter	227		
Green	Beryl Lankester	220		
CPA	Elsa Dos Santos	34		
Turnout		8,005		
Labour win (new seat)				
Labour win (new seat)				
Liberal Democrats win (new seat)				
