= Kentish Town (ward) =

Former electoral ward in the London borough of Camden

- Former electoral ward for the Camden London Borough Council
- Kentish Town ward boundaries from 2002 to 2022
- Borough: Camden
- County: Greater London
- Population: 13,417 (2011)
- Electorate: 9,624 (2018)
- Major settlements: Kentish Town

Former electoral ward
- Created: 2002
- Abolished: 2022
- Councillors: 3
- Replaced by: Kentish Town North and Kentish Town South
- ONS code: 00AGGQ
- GSS code: E05000139

Kentish Town was a ward in the London Borough of Camden, in the United Kingdom, covering Kentish Town. The ward was established for the May 2002 election. The population of the ward at the 2011 Census was 13,417. The ward was abolished for the 2022 election and its area was transferred to the newly created Kentish Town North and Kentish Town South wards.

== Camden council elections ==
Location of the Kentish Town ward in Camden

=== 2018 election ===
The election took place on 3 May 2018.

2018 Camden London Borough Council election: Kentish Town
Party	Candidate	Votes	%	±%
Labour	Georgia Gould	2,376	66.0	+12.8
Labour	Jenny Headlam-Wells	2,310	64.2	+8.7
Labour	Meric Apak	2,238	62.2	+11.2
Green	Kelly Pawlyn	572	15.9	−6.7
Green	Dee Searle	568	15.8	−5.2
Green	Charley Greenwood	556	15.5	−3.4
Liberal Democrats	Margo Dale Miller	348	9.7	+0.1
Conservative	Mac Chapwell	345	9.6	−2.0
Conservative	Darryl Davies	339	9.4	−1.5
Liberal Democrats	Victor Hjort	324	9.0	+1.2
Liberal Democrats	Jill Newbrook	300	8.3	+3.3
Conservative	Shreena Patel	261	7.3	−2.9
Turnout			37.49	
Labour hold		Swing		
Labour hold		Swing		
Labour hold		Swing		

=== 2014 election ===
The election took place on 22 May 2014.

2014 Camden London Borough Council election: Kentish Town
Party	Candidate	Votes	%	±%
Labour	Jenny Headlam-Wells	2,165	55.5	+18.7
Labour	Georgia Gould	2,076	53.2	+14.6
Labour	Meric Apak	1,992	51.0	+16.1
Green	Jack Parker	882	22.6	+3.2
Green	Alaa Owaineh	818	21.0	+9.8
Green	George Houghton	738	18.9	+3.7
Conservative	Doreen Bartlett	452	11.6	−1.6
Conservative	Darryl Davies	427	10.9	−1.2
Conservative	Paul Barton	397	10.2	−2.0
Liberal Democrats	Judy Dixey	375	9.6	−23.6
Liberal Democrats	Omar Ali	304	7.8	−23.9
UKIP	Maxine Spencer	287	7.4	N/A
Liberal Democrats	Valdir Francisco	195	5.0	−23.4
Turnout		11,128	40.8	
Labour hold		Swing		
Labour hold		Swing		
Labour hold		Swing		

=== 2010 election ===
The election on 6 May 2010 took place on the same day as the United Kingdom general election.

2010 Camden London Borough Council election: Kentish Town
Party	Candidate	Votes	%	±%
Labour	Georgia Gould	2,382	38.6	+5.4
Labour	Dave Horan	2,273	36.8	+7.1
Labour	Meric Apak	2,153	34.9	+6.4
Liberal Democrats	Ralph Scott	2,052	33.2	+0.4
Liberal Democrats	Nick Russell	1,957	31.7	−7.2
Liberal Democrats	Abdiwali Mohamud	1,755	28.4	−6.3
Green	Victoria Green	1,198	19.4	−9.5
Green	John Bird	939	15.2	−5.9
Conservative	Doreen Bartlett	812	13.2	+4.8
Conservative	Paul Barton	750	12.2	+3.8
Conservative	Darryl Davies	749	12.1	+4.7
Green	Alaa Owaineh	690	11.2	−9.6
BNP	Stephen Dorman	180	2.9	N/A
Socialist (GB)	Bill Martin	113	1.8	N/A
Turnout		6,172	64.1	+22.3
Labour gain from Liberal Democrats		Swing		
Labour hold		Swing		
Labour gain from Liberal Democrats		Swing		

=== 2006 election ===
The election took place on 4 May 2006.

2006 Camden London Borough Council election: Kentish Town
Party	Candidate	Votes	%	±%
Liberal Democrats	Philip Thompson	1,421	38.9	+10.0
Liberal Democrats	Omar Ansari	1,268	34.7	+6.6
Labour	Lucy Anderson	1,213	33.2	−7.9
Liberal Democrats	Ralph Scott	1,198	32.8	+9.6
Labour	David Horan	1,087	29.7	−7.4
Green	Siân Berry	1,057	28.9	+11.1
Labour	Deidre Krymer	1,042	28.5	−5.6
Green	Edward Chatham	772	21.1	+6.2
Green	Alexander Goodman	760	20.8	+6.2
Conservative	Matthew Murphy	308	8.4	−1.1
Conservative	Doreen Bartlett	306	8.4	−1.2
Conservative	Graham Porter	271	7.4	−0.2
Turnout		10,703	41.8	
Liberal Democrats gain from Labour		Swing		
Liberal Democrats gain from Labour		Swing		
Labour hold		Swing		

=== 2002 election ===
The election took place on 2 May 2002.

2002 Camden London Borough Council election: Kentish Town
Party	Candidate	Votes	%	±%
Labour	Lucy Anderson	961	41.1	
Labour	David Horan	868	37.1	
Labour	Deidre Krymer	797	34.1	
Liberal Democrats	Jill Fraser	676	28.9	
Liberal Democrats	Alice Brown	658	28.1	
Liberal Democrats	Nathaniel Green	543	23.2	
Green	Sue Charlesworth	415	17.8	
Socialist Alliance	Alan Walter	376	16.1	
Green	Kate Gordon	348	14.9	
Green	Graeme Durham	342	14.6	
Conservative	Doreen Bartlett	224	9.6	
Conservative	Anthony Blackburn	222	9.5	
Conservative	Alan Coleman-Harvey	177	7.6	
CPA	Celia Heliotrope	42	1.8	
Turnout		6,649		
Labour win (new seat)				
Labour win (new seat)				
Labour win (new seat)				
