= Camden Town (ward) =

Ward in the London Borough of Camden

Coordinates: 51°33′N 0°08′W

- Electoral ward for the Camden London Borough Council
- Camden Town ward boundaries since 2022
- Borough: Camden
- County: Greater London
- Population: 6,389 (2021) (Note: 2021 Census data reported for 2022 ward boundaries)
- Electorate: 4,833 (2022)
- Major settlements: Camden Town
- Area: 0.5983 square kilometres (0.2310 sq mi)

Current electoral ward
- Created: 2022
- Number of members: 2
- Councillors: Pat Callaghan; Matt Cooper
- Created from: Camden Town with Primrose Hill
- GSS code: E05013655

Camden Town is an electoral ward in the London Borough of Camden. It was created in 2022 and was first used in the 2022 elections. It returns two councillors to Camden London Borough Council.

== List of councillors ==
Seat	Councillor	Took office	Left office	Party	Election
1	Pat Callaghan	2022	Incumbent	Labour	2022, 2026
2	Richard Cotton	2022	2026	Labour	2022
2	Matt Cooper	2026	Incumbent	Labour	2026

== Summary ==
Councillors elected by party at each general borough election.

== Camden council elections ==
The ward was created in 2022 with territory that was previously part of Camden Town with Primrose Hill.

=== 2026 election ===
The election took place on 7 May 2026.

2026 Camden London Borough Council election: Camden Town
Party	Candidate	Votes	%	±%
Labour	Pat Callaghan	746		
Labour	Matt Cooper	620		
Green	Peter Goldsmith	583		
Green	Philip Nelson	544		
Reform	David Haig	142		
Conservative	James Kafton	113		
Liberal Democrats	Ekaterina Kirk	111		
Conservative	Susan Lee	109		
Reform	Vedamsh Vaidya	96		
Liberal Democrats	Rafe Offer	84		
Turnout			32.42	+3.22
Labour hold		Swing		
Labour hold		Swing		

=== 2022 election ===
The election took place on 5 May 2022.

2022 Camden London Borough Council election: Camden Town
Party	Candidate	Votes	%	±%
Labour	Pat Callaghan	1,024	72.6	
Labour	Richard Cotton	854	60.5	
Green	Charley Greenwood	286	20.3	
Conservative	Adrian Holle	163	11.6	
Conservative	Hannah Margetts	156	11.1	
Liberal Democrats	Ekaterina Kirk	139	9.9	
Liberal Democrats	Martin Wright	101	7.2	
Turnout		1,411	29.2	
Labour win (new seat)				
Labour win (new seat)				
