= Kentish Town North =

Ward in the London Borough of Camden

- ward for Camden Council
- Boundary of Kentish Town North in Camden.
- County: Greater London
- Electorate: 5,936

Current ward
- Created: 2022
- Councillor: Sylvia McNamara (Labour Co-op)
- Councillor: James Slater (Labour Co-op)
- Number of councillors: Two
- Created from: Kentish Town
- UK Parliament constituency: Holborn and St Pancras

Kentish Town North is a ward in the London Borough of Camden, in the United Kingdom. The ward represents the northern part of Kentish Town and was first used in the 2022 Camden London Borough Council election, electing two councillors to Camden London Borough Council. Most of its area was previously in the Kentish Town ward, which was abolished at the same time. In 2018, the ward had an electorate of 5,936. The Boundary Commission projects the electorate to rise to 6,205 in 2025.

== Election results ==
=== Elections in the 2020s ===
2026 Camden London Borough Council election: Kentish Town North

Kentish Town North (2 seats)
| Party | Candidate | Votes | % | ±% |
|---|---|---|---|---|
| Labour Co-op | Sylvia McNamara* | 1,367 | | |
| Labour Co-op | James Slater* | 1,351 | | |
| Green | Brigitte Ascher | 1,163 | | |
| Green | Hannah Morris | 1,129 | | |
| Reform | Claire Mortimer | 141 | | |
| Reform | Colin Rennie | 137 | | |
| Conservative | Darryl Davies | 124 | | |
| Conservative | Richard Merrin | 109 | | |
| Liberal Democrats | Roger Pillai | 84 | | |
| Liberal Democrats | Rex Shackle | 72 | | |
| Rejected ballots | | 7 | | |
| Turnout | | | 49.59 | +9.3 |
| Labour Co-op hold | | Swing | | |
| Labour Co-op hold | | Swing | | |

2022 council election: Kentish Town North
| Party | Candidate | Votes | % |
|---|---|---|---|
| Labour Co-op | Sylvia McNamara | 1,560 | 36.2 |
| Labour Co-op | James Slater | 1,303 | 30.3 |
| Green | Brigitte Ascher | 673 | 15.6 |
| Liberal Democrats | Jade Kelly | 238 | 5.53 |
| Conservative | Darryl Davies | 157 | 3.65 |
| Conservative | Lucy Sheppard | 145 | 3.37 |
| Liberal Democrats | Jillian Newbrook | 124 | 2.88 |
| TUSC | Farhana Manzoor | 105 | 2.44 |
| Turnout | | 4305 | 40.3 |
| Labour Co-op win (new seat) | | | |
| Labour Co-op win (new seat) | | | |
