= South Hampstead (ward) =

Ward in the London Borough of Camden

- Electoral ward for the Camden London Borough Council
- South Hampstead ward boundaries since 2022
- Borough: Camden
- County: Greater London
- Population: 12,163 (2021) (Note: 2021 Census data reported for 2022 ward boundaries)
- Electorate: 8,535 (2022)
- Major settlements: South Hampstead
- Area: 0.8679 km^{2} (0.3351 sq mi)

Current electoral ward
- Created: 2022
- Number of members: 3
- Councillors: Izzy Lenga; Francesca Reynolds; Arun Kumar
- Created from: Kilburn, Swiss Cottage and West Hampstead
- GSS code: E05013670

South Hampstead is an electoral ward in the London Borough of Camden. It was created in 2022 and was first used in the 2022 elections. It returns three councillors to Camden London Borough Council.

== List of councillors ==
Seat	Councillor	Took office	Left office	Party	Election
1	Nina de Ayala Parker	2022	2026	Labour	2022
2	Izzy Lenga	2022	Incumbent	Labour	2022, 2026
3	Will Prince	2022	2023	Labour	2022
3	Tommy Gale	2023	2026	Labour	2023
1	Francesca Reynolds	2026	Incumbent	Labour	2022
3	Arun Kumar	2026	Incumbent	Labour	2026

== Camden council elections ==
The ward was created in 2022 from parts of Swiss Cottage, Kilburn and West Hampstead wards.

=== 2026 election ===
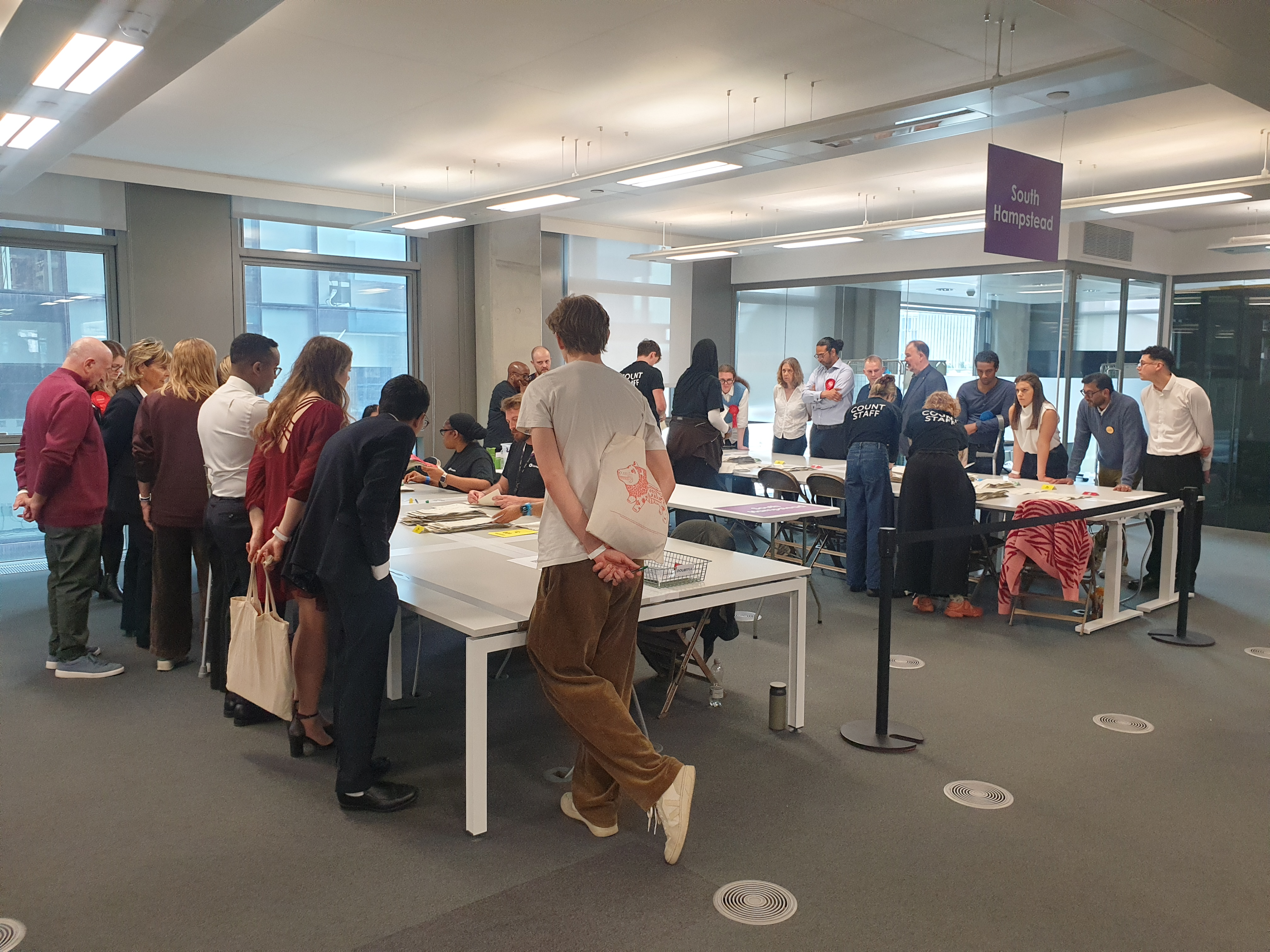
Candidates and party agents watching the count for the 7 May 2026 Camden Council elections in South Hampstead ward

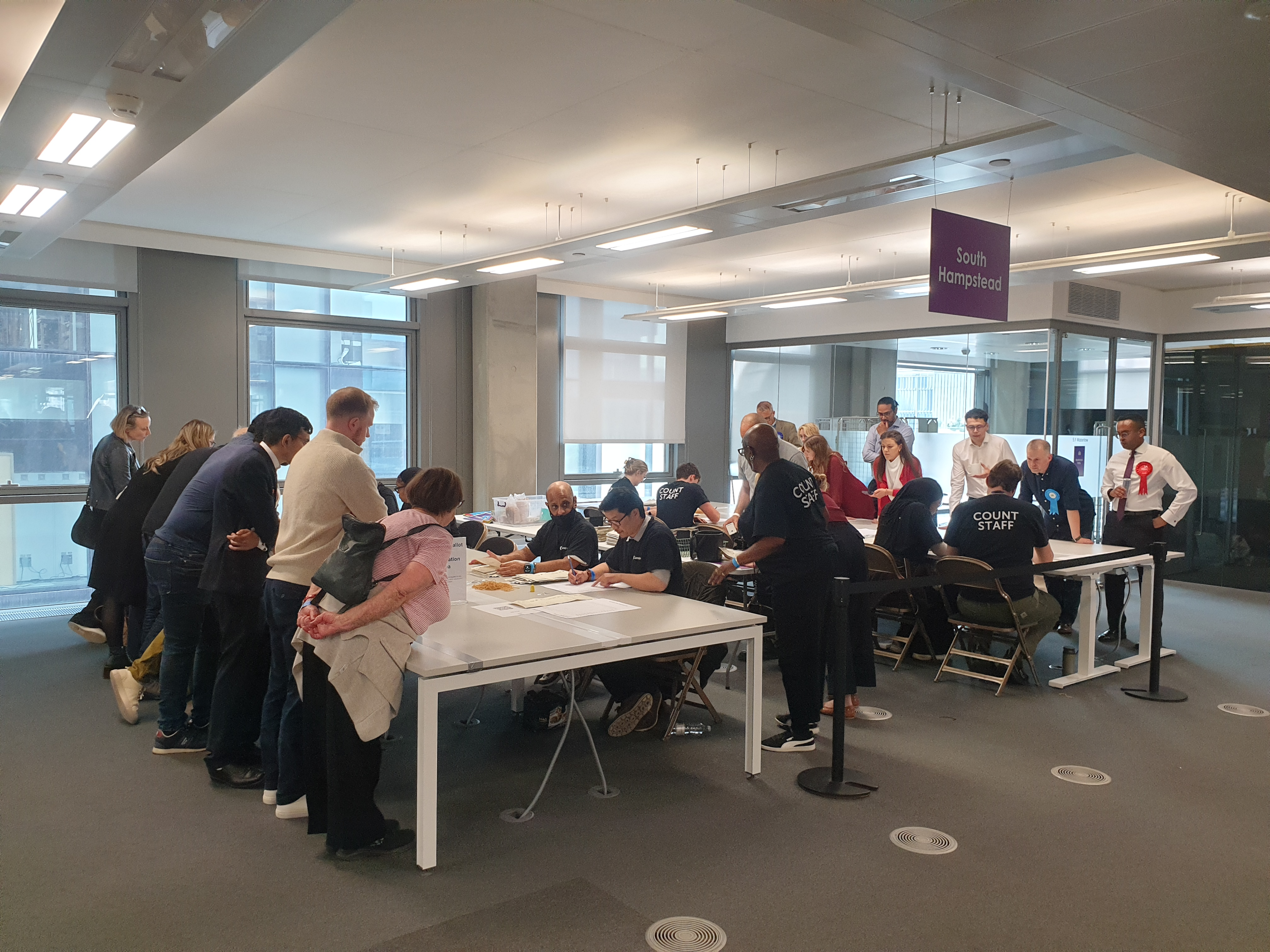
Candidates and party agents watching the count (split votes being tallied) for the 7 May 2026 Camden Council elections in South Hampstead ward

The election took place on 7 May 2026.

2026 Camden London Borough Council election: South Hampstead
Party	Candidate	Votes	%	±%
Labour	Izzy Lenga	1,006		
Labour	Francesca Reynolds	930		
Labour	Arun Kumar	925		
Conservative	Susan Aykroyd	816		
Liberal Democrats	Tara Copeland	795		
Green	Andrea Cornwell	758		
Green	CJ Jessup	711		
Liberal Democrats	Pranay Hariharan	706		
Liberal Democrats	Laurence Lodge	693		
Conservative	Andy Marsh	679		
Conservative	Wakjira Feyesa	637		
Green	John Payne	618		
Reform	Douglas De Morais	261		
Reform	Valerie Moss	247		
Turnout				
Labour hold		Swing		
Labour hold		Swing		
Labour hold		Swing		

=== 2023 by-election ===
The by-election took place on 1 June 2023, following the resignation of Will Prince.

2023 South Hampstead by-election
Party	Candidate	Votes	%	±%
Labour	Tommy Gale	882	35.65	−14.3
Conservative	Don Williams	766	30.96	+0.5
Liberal Democrats	Patrick Stillman	531	21.46	+8.3
Green	Lorna Russell	295	11.92	+11.9
Majority		116	4.7	−15.5
Turnout		2474	30.22	−6.5
Labour hold		Swing	-7.4	

=== 2022 election ===
The election took place on 5 May 2022.

2022 Camden London Borough Council election: South Hampstead
Party	Candidate	Votes	%	±%
Labour	Nina de Ayala Parker	1,692	54.1	
Labour	Izzy Lenga	1,655	52.9	
Labour	Will Prince	1,564	50.0	
Conservative	Don Williams	976	31.2	
Conservative	Calvin Po	947	30.3	
Conservative	Marx de Morais	931	29.8	
Liberal Democrats	James Baker	436	13.9	
Liberal Democrats	Aimery de Malet Roquefort	424	13.6	
Liberal Democrats	Pranay Hariharan	376	12.0	
Turnout		3,128	36.7	
Labour win (new seat)				
Labour win (new seat)				
Labour win (new seat)				
