= Kentish Town South =

Ward in the London Borough of Camden

- ward for Camden Council
- Boundary of Kentish Town South in Camden.
- County: Greater London
- Electorate: 7,841

Current ward
- Created: 2022
- Councillor: None
- Number of councillors: Three
- Created from: Cantelowes; Kentish Town
- UK Parliament constituency: Holborn and St Pancras

Kentish Town South is an electoral ward in the London Borough of Camden, in the United Kingdom. The ward was first used in the 2022 elections. It returns three councillors to Camden London Borough Council.

The ward includes the southern part of Kentish Town.

Prior to 2022, the area was part of Cantelowes and Kentish Town wards.

== List of councillors ==
Term	Councillor	Party
2022–2024	Georgia Gould	Labour
2022–present	Meriç Apak	Labour
2022–present	Jenny Headlam-Wells	Labour
2024–present	Joseph Ball	Labour

== Camden council elections ==
=== 2026 election ===
The election took place on 7 May 2026.

Kentish Town South (3 seats)
Party	Candidate	Votes	%	±%
Labour	Meriç Apak*	1,441		
Labour	Joseph Ball*	1,425		
Labour	Annabelle Williams	1,320		
Green	Pete Hutchings	1,278		
Green	Ashoka Phillips	1,209		
Green	Kai Nixon	1,198		
Reform	Genieve Laidman	272		
Reform	George Spencer	268		
Conservative	Robert Brittain	219		
Liberal Democrats	Stacey Offer	171		
Conservative	Robert Ricketts	161		
Liberal Democrats	Joseph Macdonogh	155		
Conservative	Devin Kohli	147		
Liberal Democrats	Hinne Tuinstra	124		
Rejected ballots		12		
Turnout			41.26	+24.91
Labour hold		Swing		
Labour hold		Swing		
Labour hold		Swing		

=== 2024 by-election ===
The by-election was held on 5 September 2024, following the resignation of Georgia Gould.

2024 Kentish Town South by-election
Party	Candidate	Votes	%	±%
Labour	Joseph Ball	674	46.8	−12.0
Green	Alice Brown	327	22.7	+1.1
Independent	Muhammad Naser	289	20.1	+20.1
Conservative	Shajib Ziffer	77	5.4	−2.4
Liberal Democrats	Tara Copeland	72	5.0	−3.0
Turnout				
Labour hold		Swing		

=== 2022 election ===
The election took place on 5 May 2022.

2022 council election: Kentish Town South
Party	Candidate	Votes	%	±%
Labour	Georgia Gould	1,847	24.2	N/A
Labour	Meriç Apak	1,664	21.8	N/A
Labour	Jenny Headlam-Wells	1,616	21.2	N/A
Green	Francesca Bury	678	8.9	N/A
Green	Dominic Kendrick	444	5.8	N/A
Liberal Democrats	Helena Djurkovic	250	3.3	N/A
Conservative	Susan Lee	244	3.2	N/A
Conservative	John Webber	226	3.0	N/A
Conservative	Alexander Ricketts	221	2.9	N/A
Liberal Democrats	Rebecca Trenner	174	2.3	N/A
Liberal Democrats	Derek McAuley	151	2.0	N/A
TUSC	Hannah Power	122	1.8	N/A
Turnout			35.8	
Labour win (new seat)				
Labour win (new seat)				
Labour win (new seat)				
