= Georgia Gould =

British politician (born 1986)

The Honourable Georgia Gould OBE MP
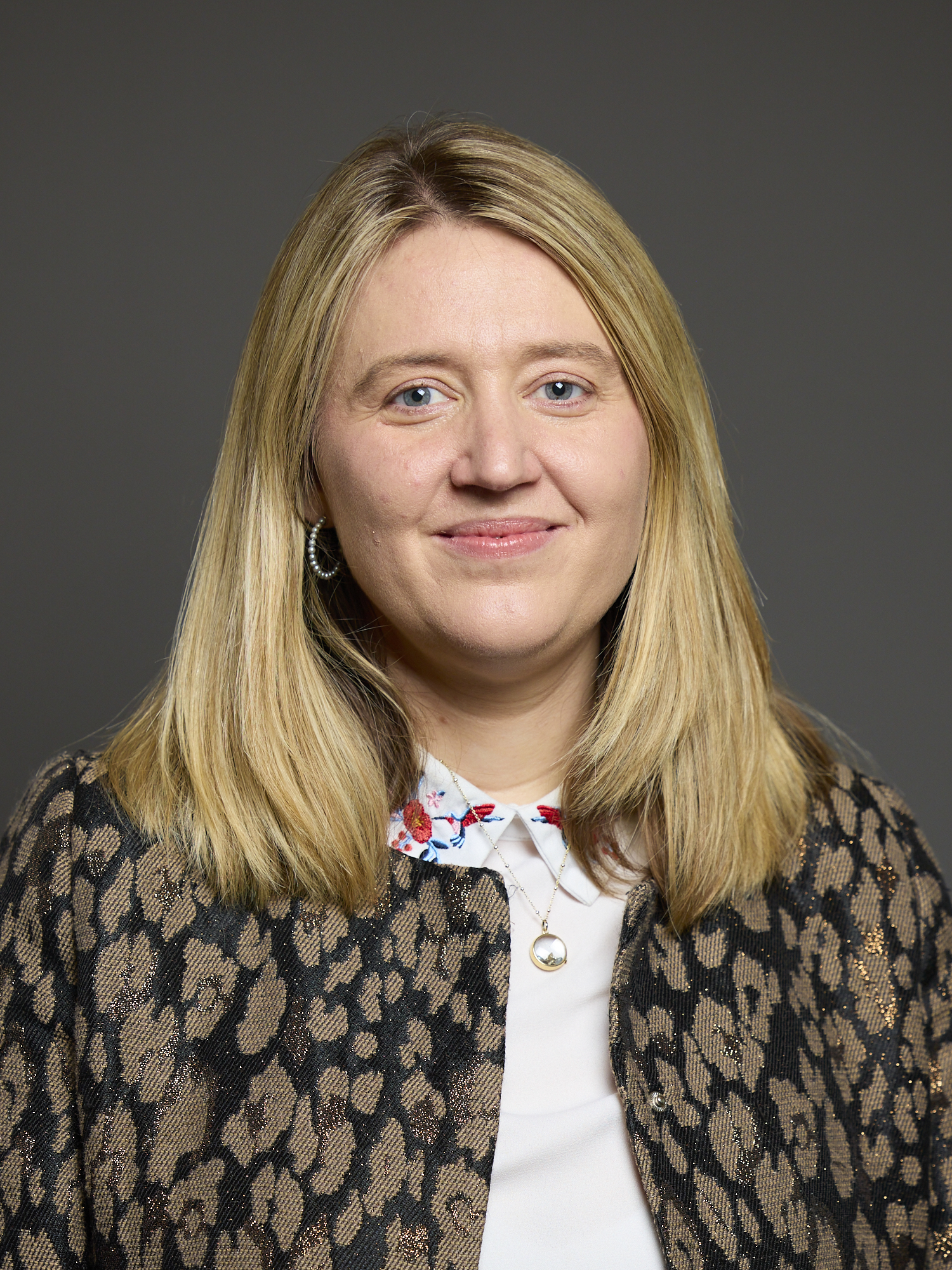
- Official portrait, 2024

Minister of State for School Standards
- Incumbent
- Assumed office 6 September 2025
- Prime Minister: Keir Starmer; Andy Burnham
- Preceded by: Catherine McKinnell

Parliamentary Secretary for the Cabinet Office
- In office 9 July 2024 – 6 September 2025 Serving with Abena Oppong-Asare
- Prime Minister: Keir Starmer
- Preceded by: Alex Burghart
- Succeeded by: Chris Ward; Satvir Kaur

Member of Parliament for Queen's Park and Maida Vale
- Incumbent
- Assumed office 4 July 2024
- Preceded by: Constituency established
- Majority: 14,913 (38.9%)

Leader of Camden Council
- In office 17 May 2017 – 11 July 2024
- Preceded by: Sarah Hayward
- Succeeded by: Richard Olszewski

Member of Camden Council for Kentish Town South Kentish Town (2010–2022)
- In office 6 May 2010 – 11 July 2024
- Preceded by: Multi member ward
- Succeeded by: Joseph Ball

Personal details
- Born: Georgia Anne Rebuck Gould; 18 May 1986 (age 40) London, England
- Party: Labour
- Parents: Philip Gould; Gail Rebuck
- Education: Camden School for Girls
- Alma mater: St Catherine's College, Oxford; London School of Economics
- Website: Official website

Georgia Anne Rebuck Gould (born 18 May 1986) is a British Labour Party politician who has been the Member of Parliament for Queen's Park and Maida Vale since the 2024 general election. She has served as Minister of State for School Standards since 2025.

Gould served as Leader of Camden Council from 2017 until 2024. A councillor from 2010 to 2024, she chaired the London Councils association from 2020 until 2024. Following the 2024 general election, Gould was appointed Parliamentary Secretary for the Cabinet Office.

As the daughter of two life peers she is styled The Honourable for life.

== Early life ==
Gould was born at St Mary's Hospital in Paddington, London, in 1986. She is the daughter of Philip Gould, Baron Gould of Brookwood, an adviser to the Labour Party who was particularly associated with former prime minister Tony Blair and his New Labour project. Lord Gould died in 2011. Her mother is Gail Rebuck, Baroness Rebuck, chair of Penguin Random House UK and a Labour peer. Owing to her background, Gould has been labelled a "red princess" by the media. Through her mother, she is Jewish, and is a member of the Jewish Labour Movement. As a baby, Gould was featured on the cover of Private Eye being held by Leader of the Opposition Neil Kinnock in the run up to the 1987 general election.

She grew up in Kentish Town, north west London; Gould and her younger sister, Grace, attended a local comprehensive secondary school, Camden School for Girls. She has spoken of growing up in a "tribal Labour household"; holidays were spent with Alastair Campbell and his wife Fiona Millar, Tessa Jowell, and the family of Tony Blair.

Prior to university, Gould spent a year as a full-time Labour Party organiser. She then studied history and politics at St Catherine's College, Oxford. Whilst at Oxford, she succeeded Blair's son Nicky, a childhood friend, as secretary of the Oxford University Labour Club. Gould holds a master's degree in global politics from the London School of Economics.

== Career ==
=== Camden Council ===
Before becoming an elected politician, Gould worked for the Tony Blair Faith Foundation as a digital manager. Politically, she has been described as a centrist, as well as a close "ally" and mentee of Alastair Campbell. She was selected as a Labour candidate for Kentish Town on Camden London Borough Council in 2009, and, aged 24, she became a Labour councillor at the 2010 elections. The ward's three seats were gained by Labour from the Liberal Democrats.

Gould became the leader of Camden Council in May 2017. In December 2019, under Gould's leadership, a FOI request revealed that Veolia, a Camden Council contractor for waste removal have never met their cleanliness targets; yet for the two previous years, the firm was only fined 0.5% from their £11.6 million payment for street cleaning. It was said that this pointed "to a local authority who have lost control of their contractor."

Following boundary changes, she represented Kentish Town South after the 2022 local elections. Gould resigned as a Camden councillor, and Leader of Camden Council, in July 2024, after becoming an MP.

=== Author ===
Gould authored the book Wasted: How Misunderstanding Young Britain Threatens Our Future, which was published by Little, Brown Book Group in February 2015. Reviewing it in The Observer, Bidisha described the book as "an easy-to-read manifesto that debunks the derogatory tabloid stereotype of useless, narcissistic hoodies, thugs, yobs and chavs." Bidisha wrote that Wasted was "inspiring", whilst noting of Gould that "she is not a natural writer and Wasted has a tendency to sound like a standard, sweeping speech".

=== Member of Parliament ===
In May 2009, Gould lost out in her attempt to become Labour's parliamentary candidate for Erith and Thamesmead, a safe seat for the party, finishing third, behind victor Teresa Pearce.

In May 2024, prior to the general election on 4 July, Gould was selected as Labour's parliamentary candidate for Queen's Park and Maida Vale, a newly created constituency which borders her borough of Camden. She won the seat with 52.5% of the votes cast, and a majority of 14,913 (38.9%) over her nearest rival.

Following her election to Parliament, Gould was appointed Parliamentary Secretary for the Cabinet Office.

In November 2024, Gould voted in favour of the Terminally Ill Adults (End of Life) Bill, which proposes to legalise assisted suicide.

In the 2025 British cabinet reshuffle, Gould was appointed to the Department for Education. In July 2026, she was reappointed to the new government as Minister of State by Andy Burnham.

She is a member of the Fabian Society.

== Personal life ==
Gould is an active member of West London Synagogue, a Reform synagogue. She married Alex Zatman at the synagogue in September 2021, in a service conducted by Rabbi Baroness Neuberger. Zatman, a civil servant at the time of his marriage, was appointed as a special advisor to Secretary of State for Work and Pensions Liz Kendall in August 2024. He left in April 2025, to work for Teneo, for whom he is a lobbyist. Gould took maternity leave from public office in autumn 2023.

== Honours ==
In the 2024 King's Birthday Honours list, Gould was appointed an Officer of the Order of the British Empire, for services to Local Government.

Parliament of the United Kingdom
New constituency	Member of Parliament for Queen's Park and Maida Vale; 2024–present	Incumbent
