= St Pancras and Somers Town =

Electoral ward in the London borough of Camden

- Electoral ward for the Camden London Borough Council
- St Pancras and Somers Town ward boundaries since 2022
- Borough: Camden
- County: Greater London
- Population: 12,512 (2021) (Note: 2021 Census data reported for 2022 ward boundaries)
- Electorate: 8,280 (2022)
- Area: 0.8510 square kilometres (0.3286 sq mi)

Current electoral ward
- Created: 2002
- Number of members: 3
- Councillors: Samata Khatoon; Shah Bakth; Shah Miah
- ONS code: 00AGGU (2002–2022)
- GSS code: E05000143 (2002–2022); E05013669 (2022–present)

St Pancras and Somers Town is a ward in the London Borough of Camden, in the United Kingdom. The ward was established for the May 2002 election. The population of this ward at the 2011 Census was 13,818. In 2018, the ward had an electorate of 8,798. The Boundary Commission projects the electorate to rise to 9,332 by 2025.

The ward underwent boundary changes for the 2022 election. Some of its area was transferred to the King's Cross ward, and some of the area of the Camden Town with Primrose Hill ward were transferred to St Pancras and Somers Town.

== List of councillors ==
Term	Councillor	Party
2002–2022	Roger Robinson	Labour
2002–2006	Sybil Shine	Labour
2002–2010	Ruth Stewart	Labour
2006–2010	Nural Islam	Labour
2010–present	Samata Khatoon	Labour
2010–2015	Peter Brayshaw	Labour
2015–2022	Paul Tomlinson	Labour
2022-2026	Edmund Frondigoun	Labour
2022–present	Shah Miah	Labour
2026-present	Shah Bakth	CPA

== Camden council elections since 2022 ==
There was a revision of ward boundaries in Camden in 2022.

=== 2026 election ===
The election took place 7 May 2026.

St Pancras and Somers Town (3 seats)
Party	Candidate	Votes	%	±%
Labour	Samata Khatoon*	1,092		
Labour	Shah Miah*	1,018		
CPA	Shah Bakth	999		
Labour	Edmund Frondigoun*	978		
CPA	Sarah Friday	943		
CPA	Raqhib Islam	906		
Reform	William Bennett	432		
Reform	Solomon Gold	367		
Reform	Theodore Roth	366		
Liberal Democrats	Hannah Billington	265		
Liberal Democrats	Stewart Jenkins	192		
Liberal Democrats	David Elkan	191		
Conservative	Alex Ellis	188		
Conservative	David Roberts	162		
Conservative	Cosmo Webster	161		
NHPUK	Angel Daden	65		
Turnout				

=== 2022 election ===
The election took place on 5 May 2022.

2022 Camden London Borough Council election: St Pancras and Somers Town
Party	Candidate	Votes	%	±%
Labour	Samata Khatoon	1,874	68.8	
Labour	Edmund Frondigoun	1,845	67.7	
Labour	Shah Miah	1,799	66.0	
Conservative	Alex Ellis	322	11.8	
Liberal Democrats	Hannah Billington	299	11.0	
Conservative	Carole Ricketts	290	10.6	
Conservative	Axel Kaae	268	9.8	
Workers Party	Awal Miah	239	8.8	
Liberal Democrats	Stewart Jenkins	217	8.0	
Workers Party	M D Shah	202	7.4	
Workers Party	Neisha Wong	196	7.2	
Liberal Democrats	Michael Pedersen	183	6.7	
Turnout		2,724	32.9	
Labour win (new boundaries)				
Labour win (new boundaries)				
Labour win (new boundaries)				

== 2002–2022 Camden council elections ==
St Pancras and Somers Town ward boundaries from 2002 to 2022

=== 2018 election ===
The election took place on 3 May 2018.

2018 Camden London Borough Council election: St Pancras and Somers Town
Party	Candidate	Votes	%	±%
Labour	Samata Khatoon	2,611	74.6	+10.4
Labour	Roger Robinson	2,520	72.0	+5.4
Labour	Paul Tomlinson	2,460	70.3	+4.4
Green	Tina Swasey	341	9.7	−5.2
Conservative	David Allen	295	8.4	−1.4
Conservative	Doreen Bartlett	295	8.4	−0.9
Green	Mark Scantlebury	264	7.5	−6.4
Liberal Democrats	Kimberley Lauren Stansfield	251	7.2	+0.7
Conservative	Robert Lingard	243	6.9	−0.9
Liberal Democrats	Sarah Hoyle	230	6.6	+1.5
Liberal Democrats	James Maurice Barker	192	5.5	+0.8
UKIP	Oliver Dominic Ronald Butt	103	2.9	N/A
UKIP	Christopher Cooke	84	2.4	N/A
UKIP	Giles Game	82	2.3	N/A
Turnout			35.11	
Labour hold		Swing		
Labour hold		Swing		
Labour hold		Swing		

=== 2015 by-election ===
The by-election took place on 5 March 2015, following the death of Peter Brayshaw.

2015 St Pancras and Somers Town by-election
Party	Candidate	Votes	%	±%
Labour	Paul Tomlinson	1,481	72.8	+4.7
Conservative	Shahin Ahmed	243	12.0	+2.0
Green	Tina Swasey	213	10.5	−4.8
Liberal Democrats	Zack Polanski	96	4.7	−1.9
Turnout			21.81	−16.8
Labour hold		Swing	+1.4	

=== 2014 election ===
The election took place on 22 May 2014.

2014 Camden London Borough Council election: St Pancras and Somers Town
Party	Candidate	Votes	%	±%
Labour	Roger Robinson	2,511		
Labour	Peter Brayshaw	2,488		
Labour	Samata Khatoon	2,423		
Green	Matty Mitford	562		
Green	James Widdowson	526		
Green	Koonal Kirit Shah	440		
Conservative	Rob Culligan	368		
Conservative	Brian Rice	351		
Conservative	Elliot Miller	295		
Liberal Democrats	Abdul Hannan Tarofdar	245		
Liberal Democrats	Nana Oye Adjepong	192		
Liberal Democrats	Nicole Sykes	178		
Turnout		10,617	38.6	
Labour hold		Swing		
Labour hold		Swing		
Labour hold		Swing		

=== 2010 election ===
The election on 6 May 2010 took place on the same day as the United Kingdom general election.

2010 Camden London Borough Council election: St Pancras and Somers Town
Party	Candidate	Votes	%	±%
Labour	Roger Robinson	2,744	52.9	+7.8
Labour	Peter Brayshaw	2,650	51.1	+10.4
Labour	Samata Khatoon	2,614	50.4	+11.3
Liberal Democrats	Abdus Shaheed	1,024	19.7	+5.7
Liberal Democrats	Dave Hoefling	1,011	19.5	+8.8
Liberal Democrats	Frederic Carver	927	17.9	+7.7
Green	Natalie Bennett	738	14.2	−2.5
Conservative	Adam Lester	721	13.9	−0.3
Conservative	Brian Rice	701	13.5	−0.3
Conservative	Patsy Prince	688	13.3	−0.3
Green	Matty Mitford	467	9.0	−2.9
Green	Cathryn Symons	422	8.1	+1.2
Turnout		5,190	57.2	+18.2
Labour hold		Swing		
Labour hold		Swing		
Labour hold		Swing		

=== 2006 election ===
The election took place on 4 May 2006.

2006 Camden London Borough Council election: St Pancras and Somers Town
Party	Candidate	Votes	%	±%
Labour	Roger Robinson	1,399	45.1	−7.9
Labour	Nural Islam	1,264	40.7	−9.1
Labour	Ruth Stewart	1,212	39.1	−8.6
Respect	Nuruzzaman Hira	781	25.2	N/A
Green	Beatrix Campbell	517	16.7	+4.6
Conservative	Rohit Grover	440	14.2	−0.3
Liberal Democrats	Margaret Finer	433	14.0	−6.9
Conservative	Robert Ricketts	429	13.8	−0.5
Conservative	Abdul Salam	422	13.6	−0.1
Green	Richard Eden	369	11.9	+5.1
Liberal Democrats	Charles Marquand	332	10.7	−8.8
Liberal Democrats	Barbara Waddington	317	10.2	−9.1
Green	Matthew Hodgkinson-Barrett	213	6.9	+0.5
Independent	Robert Austin	181	5.8	N/A
Turnout		8,309	39.0	
Labour hold		Swing		
Labour hold		Swing		
Labour hold		Swing		

=== 2002 election ===
The election took place on 2 May 2002.

2002 Camden London Borough Council election: St Pancras and Somers Town
Party	Candidate	Votes	%	±%
Labour	Roger Robinson	960	53.0	
Labour	Sybil Shine	902	49.8	
Labour	Ruth Stewart	865	47.7	
Liberal Democrats	Elizabeth Hanna	379	20.9	
Liberal Democrats	Fiona Palmer	353	19.5	
Liberal Democrats	Ian Myers	349	19.3	
Conservative	Simon Gray	263	14.5	
Conservative	Damian Keegan	259	14.3	
Conservative	James White	249	13.7	
Green	Una Sapietis	219	12.1	
Socialist Alliance	Pol O'Ceallaigh	211	11.6	
Green	Andrew Spring	124	6.8	
Green	Judith Stubbings	116	6.4	
Turnout		5,249		
Labour win (new seat)				
Labour win (new seat)				
Labour win (new seat)				
