= Primrose Hill (ward) =

Ward in the London Borough of Camden

- ward for Camden Council
- Boundary of Primrose Hill in Camden.
- County: Greater London
- Electorate: 8,982

Current ward
- Created: 2022
- Councillor: None
- Number of councillors: Three
- Created from: Camden Town with Primrose Hill; Swiss Cottage
- UK Parliament constituency: Hampstead and Highgate
- UK Parliament constituency: Holborn and St Pancras

Primrose Hill is a ward in the London Borough of Camden, in the United Kingdom. The ward represents the area of the same name, and the eastern part of the Swiss Cottage area. The ward was first used for the 2022 Camden London Borough Council election, and elects three councillors to Camden London Borough Council. Most of its area was previously in the Camden Town with Primrose Hill and Swiss Cottage wards, which were abolished at the same time, and a small part was transferred from the Belsize ward. In 2018, the ward had an electorate of 8,982. The Boundary Commission projects the electorate to rise to 9,049 in 2025.

The ward contains a part of Primrose Hill park, Swiss Cottage Library and the Hampstead Theatre. Schools in the ward include UCL Academy, Swiss Cottage special school and St Paul's CE primary. The area houses the Chalcots Estate and the Adelaide medical Centre.

== History ==
In January 2022, in the leadup to the ward's creation, councillors for the Camden Town and Primrose Hill ward Pat Callaghan and Richard Cotton lamented the Local Government Boundary Commission for England's redrawing of the wards of Camden, which split Camden Town with Primrose Hill into separate Camden Town and Primrose Hill wards. Callaghan and Cotton stood in the Camden Town ward at the 2022 council election.

== Election results ==
=== 2026 election ===
Primrose Hill (3 seats)
Party	Candidate	Votes	%	±%
Labour	Dan Corby	1,209	35.9	
Labour	Lauren Keiles	1,196	35.6	
Labour	Suleiman Osman	1,013	30.1	
Conservative	Esmeralda Akpoke	977	29.0	
Conservative	Paul Tavares	956	28.4	
Conservative	Shajib Ziffer	794	23.6	
Green	Tom Ash	785	23.3	
Green	Helen Tindale	749	22.3	
Green	Matthew Wrigley	621	18.5	
Reform	David Flatley	340	10.1	
Liberal Democrats	Catherine Hays	328	9.8	
Reform	Nik Lodenos	292	8.7	
Reform	Nicholas Theodorou	290	8.6	
Liberal Democrats	Lawrence Nicholson	289	8.6	
Liberal Democrats	Lenka Fekulova	251	7.5	
Turnout				

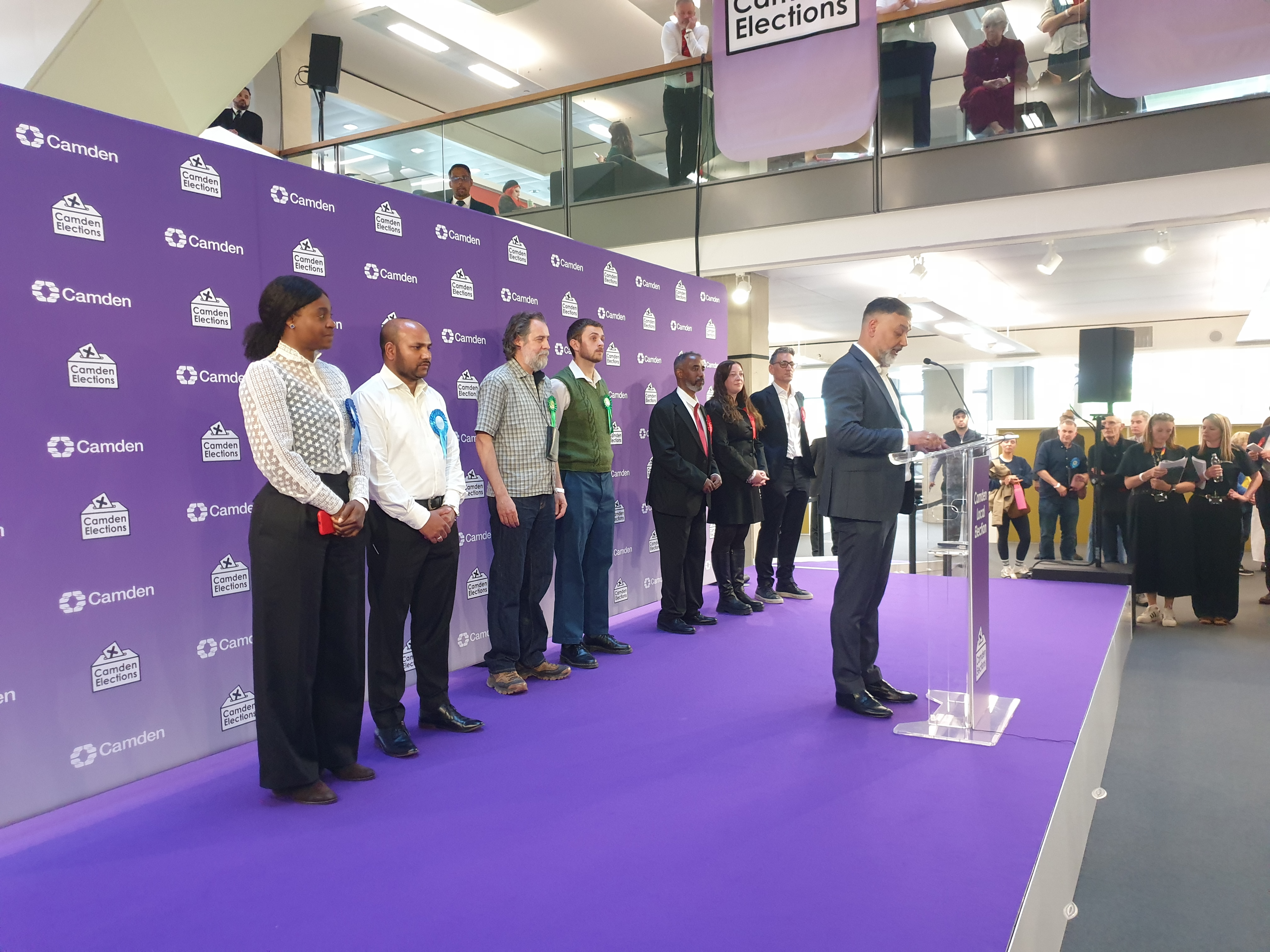
Declaration of the result for the Primrose Hill ward on 8 May 2026 in the Camden elections held on 7 May

=== 2022 election ===
2022 council election: Primrose Hill
Party	Candidate	Votes	%	±%
Labour	Anna Burrage	1,568		
Labour	Ajok Athian	1,375		
Labour	Matt Cooper	1,343		
Conservative	Alex Andrews	1,009		
Conservative	Pierre Andrews	959		
Conservative	Alexandra Marsanu	910		
Green	Matthew Wrigley	647		
Liberal Democrats	James Bowen	488		
Liberal Democrats	Hinne Temminck Tuinstra	373		
Independent	Phil Cowan	339		
Turnout			36.5	
Labour win (new seat)				
Labour win (new seat)				
Labour win (new seat)				
