= 2022 Camden London Borough Council election =

2022 local election in Camden

2022 Camden Council election
- 5 May 2022

All 55 council seats
- Registered: 148,756
- Turnout: 51,837; 34.8%
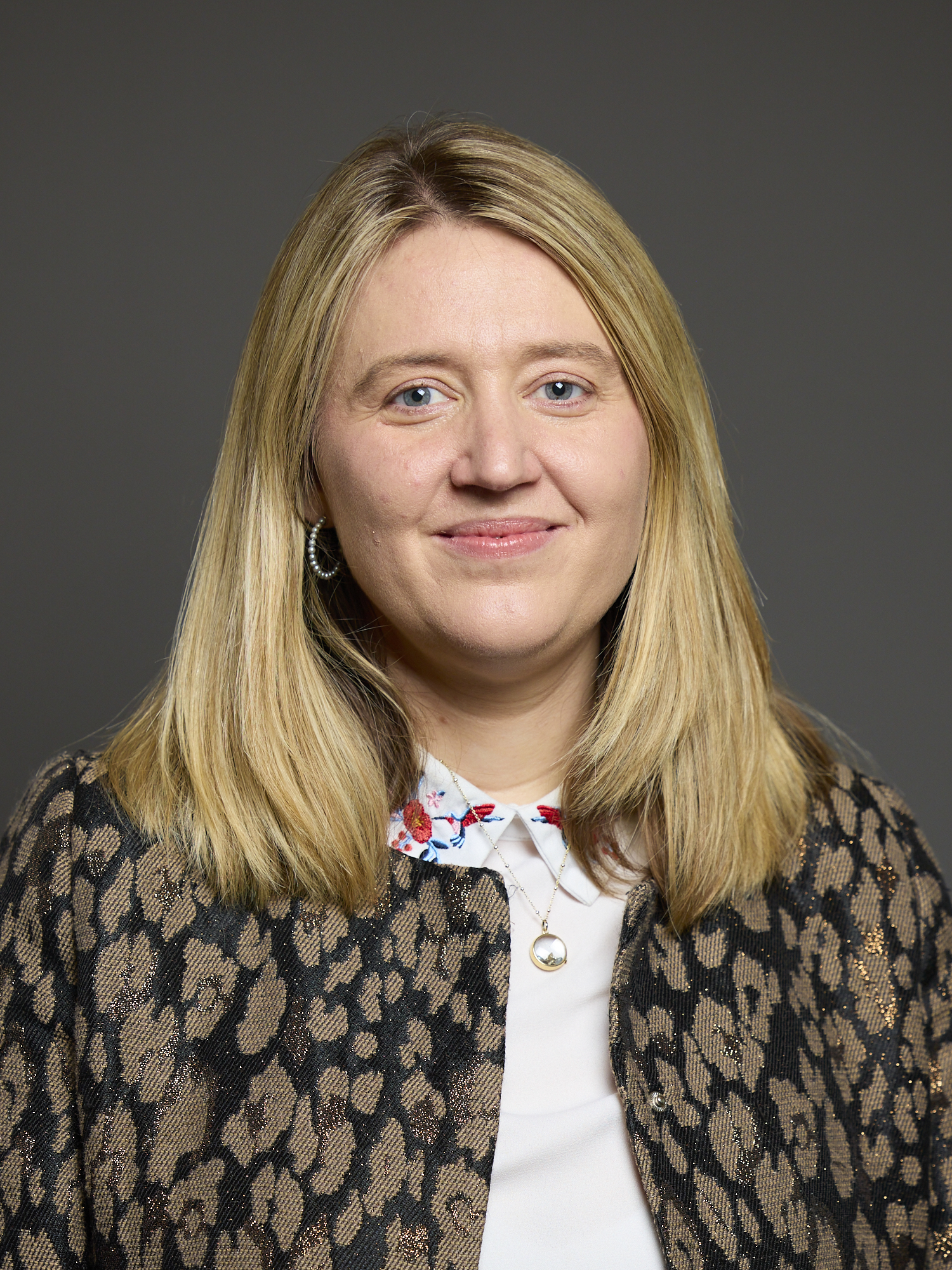

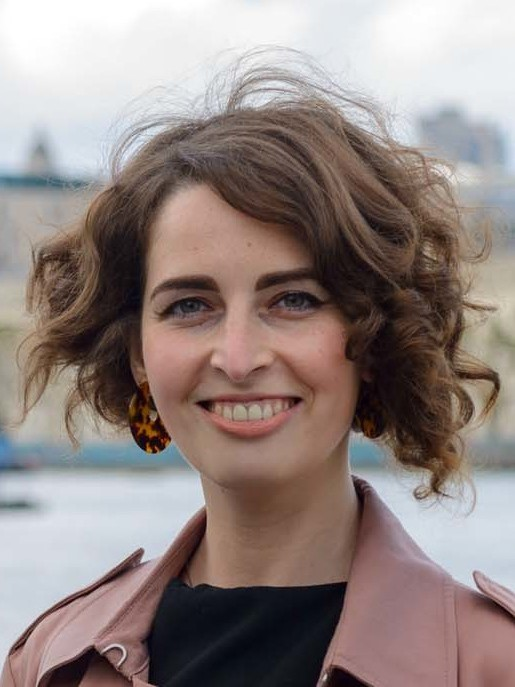

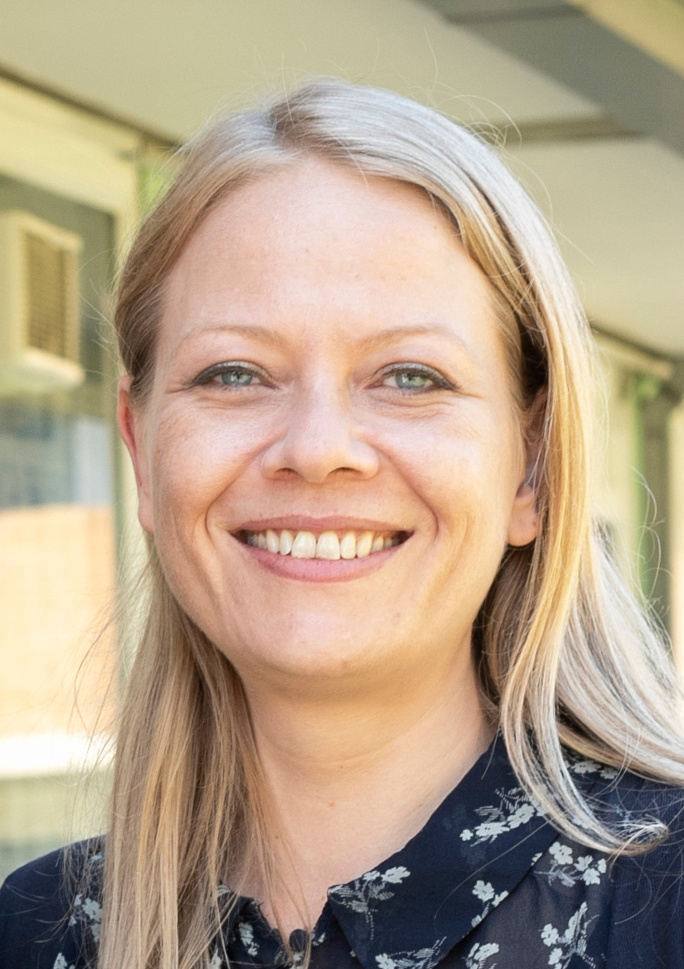
	First party	Second party
Leader	Georgia Gould	Luisa Porritt
Party	Labour	Liberal Democrats
Leader since	2 May 2017	7 September 2020
Leader's seat	Kentish Town South	Belsize (retiring)
Last election	43 seats, 47.6%	3 seats, 17.4%
Seats before	41	3
Seats won	47	4
Seat change	▲1 (Note: Owing to boundary changes, this figure is notional)	▲3
Popular vote	77,587	24,098
Percentage	56.6%	17.6%
Swing	▲9.1%	▲0.2%
	Third party	Fourth party
Leader	Oliver Cooper	Siân Berry
Party	Conservative	Green
Leader since	May 2018	May 2014
Leader's seat	Hampstead Town (stood in Belsize, defeated)	Highgate
Last election	7 seats, 20.5%	1 seat, 12.6%
Seats before	7	2
Seats won	3	1
Seat change	▼4	Steady
Popular vote	26,300	6,965
Percentage	19.2%	5.1%
Swing	▼1.3%	▼7.6%
- Map showing the results of the 2022 Camden London Borough Council election

- Council composition after the election. Labour in red, Liberal Democrats in amber, Conservatives in blue, Greens in green.
council control before election
Labour
Subsequent council control
Labour

The 2022 Camden London Borough Council election took place on 5 May 2022. All 55 members of Camden London Borough Council were elected. The elections took place alongside local elections in the other London boroughs and elections to local authorities across the United Kingdom.

In the previous election in 2018, the Labour Party maintained its control of the council, winning 43 out of the 54 seats with the Conservative Party forming the primary opposition with seven of the remaining seats. The Liberal Democrats and Green Party were also elected to the council, with three seats and one seat respectively. The 2022 election took place under new election boundaries, which increased the number of councillors to 55.

Labour held control of the council, winning 47 seats. The Liberal Democrats overtook the Conservatives as the second-largest group, winning four seats.

== Background ==
=== History ===
Result of the 2018 borough election

The thirty-two London boroughs were established in 1965 by the London Government Act 1963. They are the principal authorities in Greater London and have responsibilities including education, housing, planning, highways, social services, libraries, recreation, waste, environmental health and revenue collection. Some of the powers are shared with the Greater London Authority, which also manages passenger transport, police and fire.

Since its formation, Camden has variously been under Labour control, no overall control and Conservative control. Only Labour, Conservative, Liberal Democrat and Green councillors have been elected to the council. The council has had an overall Labour majority since the 2010 election, in which Labour won thirty seats, the Liberal Democrats won thirteen, the Conservatives won ten and the Greens won a single seat. The Liberal Democrats lost all but one of their seats in the 2014 election, with Labour gaining ten and the Conservatives gaining two. The Green Party maintained their seat, at this point held by the party's future leader Siân Berry. The most recent election in 2018 saw Labour make further gains to win 43 seats (10 of which Labour and Co-operative) with 47.6% of the overall vote. The Conservatives fell to five seats with 20.5% of the vote, the Liberal Democrats won three with 17.4% of the vote and Berry held her seat for the Green Party with her party winning 12.6% of the vote across the borough. The incumbent leader of the council is the Labour councillor Georgia Gould, who has held that position since 2017.

=== Council term ===
In November 2019, a Labour councillor for Haverstock ward, Abi Wood, resigned as a councillor. The by-election to replace her was held on 12 December 2019, the same date as the 2019 general election. The Labour candidate, Gail McAnena-Wood, won. The leader of the Liberal Democrat group on the council, Luisa Porritt, stood as her party's candidate in the 2021 London mayoral election, coming fourth with 4.4% of the vote.

In June 2021, the Liberal Democrat councillor for Fortune Green ward, Flick Rea, resigned. A by-election to replace her was held on 22 July 2021, which was won by the Liberal Democrat candidate and former councillor for the ward Nancy Jirira. A Labour and Co-operative councillor for Fortune Green, Lorna Russell, defected to the Green Party in November 2021, saying that her previous party had "changed a lot". In the same month, the Labour councillor Lazzaro Pietragnoli resigned first as the Labour group whip and then as a councillor after he admitted he had run an anonymous Twitter account that he used to promote himself and attack his colleagues. In December 2021, the Conservative group leader Oliver Cooper said he would change wards to the Belsize, which was marginal between his party and the Liberal Democrats. In February 2022, Porritt announced she would stand down as a councillor at the 2022 election, citing work commitments. In March 2022, Ali Hassan Ali, a Conservative candidate in West Hampstead, stood down as a candidate and defected to the Labour Party, describing the local Conservative Party as "toxic". Party organisers claimed that he had been abusive, which Ali denied.

Along with most other London boroughs, Camden was subject to a boundary review ahead of the 2022 election. The Local Government Boundary Commission for England concluded that the council should have 55 seats, an increase of one, and produced new election boundaries following a period of consultation.

== Electoral process ==
Camden, like other London borough councils, elects all of its councillors at once every four years. The previous election took place in 2018. The election took place using Plurality block voting, with each ward being represented by two or three councillors. Electors had as many votes as there are councillors to be elected in their ward, with the top two or three being elected.

All registered electors (British, Irish, Commonwealth and European Union citizens) living in London aged 18 or over were entitled to vote in the election. People who lived at two addresses in different councils, such as university students with different term-time and holiday addresses, were entitled to be registered for and vote in elections in both local authorities. Voting in-person at polling stations took place from 7:00 to 22:00 on election day, and voters were able to apply for postal votes or proxy votes in advance of the election.

== Campaign ==
The Evening Standard reported that junctions near Holborn tube station where several cyclists had been killed might be a factor in the election, after planned changes were paused due to the COVID-19 pandemic affecting funding. The Conservatives proposed holding online referendums for every major policy.

== Previous council composition ==
Council composition after the 2018 election

Council composition ahead of the 2022 election

After 2018 election		Before 2022 election	
Party	Seats	Party	Seats
Labour	43	Labour	41
Conservative	7	Conservative	7
Liberal Democrats	3	Liberal Democrats	3
Green	1	Green	2
		Vacant	1

== Results summary ==
2022 Camden London Borough Council election
Party	Seats	Gains	Losses	Net gain/loss	Seats %	Votes %	Votes	+/−
Labour	47			▲1	85.5	56.6	77,587	+9.0
Liberal Democrats	4			▲3	7.3	17.6	24,098	+0.2
Conservative	3			▼4	5.5	19.2	26,300	-1.3
Green	1			Steady	1.8	5.1	6,965	-7.5
Independent	0			Steady	0.0	0.8	1,152	-0.4
Workers Party	0			Steady	0.0	0.5	637	N/A
TUSC	0			Steady	0.0	0.2	227	N/A
Let London Live	0			Steady	0.0	0.1	114	N/A

As the wards of the London Borough of Camden were redrawn between the 2018 and 2022 elections, the seat changes for each party are based on notional results generated by the BBC, which estimate the outcome of the 2018 election if the new ward boundaries had been used.

== Results by ward ==
Candidates seeking re-election are marked with an asterisk (*). Councillors seeking re-election for a different ward are marked with a cross (^{†}). Data from Camden Borough Council.

=== Belsize ===
Belsize (3 seats)
Party	Candidate	Votes	%
Liberal Democrats	Tom Simon*	1,494	45.8
Liberal Democrats	Judy Dixey	1,445	44.3
Liberal Democrats	Matthew Kirk	1,317	40.4
Conservative	Oliver Cooper^{†}	1,124	34.4
Conservative	Steve Adams*	1,106	33.9
Conservative	Aarti Joshi	953	29.2
Labour	Issy Waite	705	21.6
Labour	Shaheen Chowdhury	692	21.2
Labour	Peter Ptashko	644	19.7
Turnout		3,263	38.4
Liberal Democrats win (new seat)			
Liberal Democrats win (new seat)			
Liberal Democrats win (new seat)			

=== Bloomsbury ===
Bloomsbury (3 seats)
Party	Candidate	Votes	%
Labour	Sabrina Francis*	1,411	66.4
Labour	Adam Harrison*	1,346	63.3
Labour	Rishi Madlani*	1,269	59.7
Liberal Democrats	Catherine Hays	400	18.8
Conservative	William Frost	378	17.8
Conservative	Richard Hayward	351	16.5
Conservative	Paul Bhangal	335	15.8
Liberal Democrats	Jonathan Lewin	291	13.7
Liberal Democrats	Farrell Monk	281	13.2
Turnout		2,125	30.2
Labour win (new seat)			
Labour win (new seat)			
Labour win (new seat)			

=== Camden Square ===
Camden Square (2 seats)
Party	Candidate	Votes	%
Labour	Danny Beales^{†}	1,309	74.0
Labour	Sagal Abdiwali	1,275	72.1
Liberal Democrats	Anne Wright	244	13.8
Liberal Democrats	Lawrence Nicholson	218	12.3
Conservative	Catherine McQueen	180	10.2
Conservative	Jack Tinley	146	8.3
Turnout		1,769	31.8
Labour win (new seat)			
Labour win (new seat)			

=== Camden Town ===
Camden Town (2 seats)
Party	Candidate	Votes	%
Labour	Pat Callaghan^{†}	1,024	72.6
Labour	Richard Cotton^{†}	854	60.5
Green	Charley Greenwood	286	20.3
Conservative	Adrian Holle	163	11.6
Conservative	Hannah Margetts	156	11.1
Liberal Democrats	Ekaterina Kirk	139	9.9
Liberal Democrats	Martin Wright	101	7.2
Turnout		1,411	29.2
Labour win (new seat)			
Labour win (new seat)			

=== Fortune Green ===
Fortune Green (3 seats)
Party	Candidate	Votes	%	±%
Liberal Democrats	Nancy Jirira*	1,481	46.4	+5.3
Labour Co-op	Lorna Greenwood	1,479	46.3	+6.0
Labour Co-op	Richard Olszewski*	1,397	43.8	+6.6
Labour Co-op	Marcus Storm	1,288	40.3	+3.9
Liberal Democrats	Tracey Shackle	1,238	38.8	+7.5
Liberal Democrats	William Coles	1,151	36.0	0
Conservative	Keith Sedgwick	376	11.8	−9.0
Conservative	Hannah David	374	11.7	−6.5
Conservative	Jamie Webb	362	11.3	−6.8
Turnout		3,193	37.2	
Liberal Democrats hold		Swing	+7.15	
Labour Co-op hold		Swing	+6.25	
Labour Co-op hold		Swing	+6.7	

=== Frognal ===
Frognal (2 seats)
Party	Candidate	Votes	%	±%
Conservative	Andrew Parkinson^{†}	923	50.9	−0.5
Conservative	Gio Spinella^{†}	890	49.0	−1.6
Labour	Suber Abdikarim	473	26.1	−0.7
Labour	John Carr	469	25.8	−0.8
Green	Charles Harris	276	15.2	+7.8
Liberal Democrats	Adrian Bridge	274	15.1	+1.2
Liberal Democrats	Valdir Francisco	236	13.0	+1.4
Turnout		1,815	33.9	
Conservative win (new seat)				
Conservative win (new seat)				

=== Gospel Oak ===
Gospel Oak (3 seats)
Party	Candidate	Votes	%
Labour	Jenny Mulholland*	1,927	65.5
Labour	Marcus Boyland*	1,880	63.9
Labour	Larraine Revah*	1,860	63.2
Liberal Democrats	Margaret Jackson-Roberts	492	16.7
Conservative	Jah-Love Charles	466	15.8
Liberal Democrats	Laura Noel	460	15.6
Conservative	Nigel Rumble	449	15.3
Conservative	Esmeralda Akpoke	434	14.7
Liberal Democrats	David Simmons	354	12.0
Independent	Chrislyn Pict	89	3.0
Turnout		2,944	33.5
Labour win (new seat)			
Labour win (new seat)			
Labour win (new seat)			

=== Hampstead Town ===
Hampstead Town (2 seats)
Party	Candidate	Votes	%
Conservative	Stephen Stark*	1,089	42.2
Labour Co-op	Adrian Cohen	1,030	39.9
Labour Co-op	Alexandra Sufit	971	37.6
Conservative	Deborah Dor	887	34.4
Liberal Democrats	Anne Ward	609	23.6
Liberal Democrats	Nicholas Russell	435	16.9
Turnout		2,581	43.3
Conservative hold			
Labour Co-op gain from Conservative			

=== Haverstock ===
Haverstock (3 seats)
Party	Candidate	Votes	%
Labour	Kemi Atolagbe	1,523	56.7
Labour	Rebecca Filer	1,430	53.2
Labour	Nasrine Djemai	1,402	52.2
Green	Peter McGinty	643	23.9
Liberal Democrats	Jill Fraser	427	15.9
Liberal Democrats	Fiona Fraser	368	13.7
Liberal Democrats	Diane Culligan	313	11.6
Conservative	Timothy Frost	312	11.6
Conservative	David Roberts	294	10.9
Conservative	Shreena Parkinson	292	10.9
Independent	Alice Brown	278	10.3
Independent	Mohamed Farah	232	8.6
Turnout		2,687	31.3
Labour win (new seat)			
Labour win (new seat)			
Labour win (new seat)			

=== Highgate ===
Highgate (3 seats)
Party	Candidate	Votes	%	±%
Green	Siân Berry*	1,967	51.0	+0.9
Labour	Anna Wright*	1,898	49.2	+7.1
Labour	Camron Aref-Adib	1,809	46.9	+5.1
Labour	Panny Antoniou	1,527	39.6	+2.6
Green	Lorna Russell^{†}	1,460	37.8	+6.7
Green	David Stansell	929	24.1	−4.9
Conservative	Paul Farrow	431	11.2	−4.8
Conservative	Judith Barnes	403	10.4	−1.7
Conservative	Richard Merrin	380	9.8	−1.4
Liberal Democrats	Munro Price	206	5.3	−1.6
Liberal Democrats	Henry Potts	188	4.9	−1.1
Liberal Democrats	Stephen Pickthall	172	4.5	−1.4
Turnout		3,859	49.0	−1.42
Green hold		Swing	+1.75	
Labour hold		Swing	+6.9	
Labour hold		Swing	+3.75	

=== Holborn and Covent Garden ===
Holborn and Covent Garden (3 seats)
Party	Candidate	Votes	%
Labour	Julian Fulbrook*	1,807	68.8
Labour	Sue Vincent*	1,779	67.7
Labour	Awale Olad*	1,686	64.2
Conservative	Maurice Hirt	362	13.8
Conservative	Adam Lester	354	13.5
Conservative	Alison Frost	349	13.3
Liberal Democrats	Charlotte O'Brien	299	11.4
Liberal Democrats	Stephen Barabas	268	10.2
Independent	Patrick McGinnis	214	8.1
Liberal Democrats	Erich Wagner	213	8.1
Turnout		2,626	32.9
Labour win (new seat)			
Labour win (new seat)			
Labour win (new seat)			

=== Kentish Town North ===
Kentish Town North (2 seats)
Party	Candidate	Votes	%
Labour Co-op	Sylvia McNamara	1,560	70.0
Labour Co-op	James Slater	1,303	58.5
Green	Brigitte Ascher	673	30.2
Liberal Democrats	Jade Kelly	238	10.7
Conservative	Darryl Davies	157	7.0
Liberal Democrats	Jillian Newbrook	124	5.6
Conservative	Lucy Sheppard	145	6.5
TUSC	Farhana Manzoor	105	4.7
Turnout		2,229	40.3
Labour Co-op win (new seat)			
Labour Co-op win (new seat)			

=== Kentish Town South ===
Kentish Town South (3 seats)
Party	Candidate	Votes	%
Labour	Georgia Gould^{†}	1,847	69.5
Labour	Meriç Apak^{†}	1,664	62.6
Labour	Jenny Headlam-Wells^{†}	1,616	60.8
Green	Francesca Bury	678	25.5
Green	Dominic Kendrick	444	16.7
Liberal Democrats	Helena Djurkovic	250	9.4
Conservative	Susan Lee	244	9.2
Conservative	John Webber	226	8.5
Conservative	Alexander Ricketts	221	8.3
Liberal Democrats	Rebecca Trenner	174	6.5
Liberal Democrats	Derek McAuley	151	5.7
TUSC	Hannah Power	122	4.6
Turnout		2,658	35.8
Labour win (new seat)			
Labour win (new seat)			
Labour win (new seat)			

=== Kilburn ===
Kilburn (3 seats)
Party	Candidate	Votes	%	±%
Labour	Eddie Hanson	1,646	68.2	+7.0
Labour	Lloyd Hatton	1,521	63.0	+1.9
Labour	Nanouche Umeadi	1,405	58.2	+1.0
Conservative	Alexander Pelling-Bruce	447	18.5	+2.3
Conservative	Rahoul Bhansali	395	16.4	+1.0
Liberal Democrats	Kathryn Sturgeon	375	15.5	+1.7
Conservative	Marc Nykolyszyn	340	14.1	+1.0
Liberal Democrats	Hamir Patel	288	11.9	−1.8
Liberal Democrats	Daviyani Kothari	286	11.8	+2.3
Turnout		2,414	29.6	−2.83
Labour hold		Swing	+4.65	
Labour hold		Swing	+1.45	
Labour hold		Swing	+ 0.85	

=== King's Cross ===
King's Cross (3 seats)
Party	Candidate	Votes	%
Labour	Lotis Bautista	1,317	68.4
Labour	Liam Martin-Lane	1,256	65.2
Labour	Jonathan Simpson*	1,205	62.6
Green	Alex Smith	417	21.7
Conservative	Catherine Frost	249	12.9
Conservative	Douglas de Morais	219	11.4
Conservative	Clementine Manning	218	11.3
Liberal Democrats	Joan Baktis	214	11.1
Liberal Democrats	Benjamin Newman	185	9.6
Liberal Democrats	Jack Fleming	167	8.7
Turnout		1,926	27.4
Labour win (new seat)			
Labour win (new seat)			
Labour win (new seat)			

=== Primrose Hill ===
Primrose Hill (3 seats)
Party	Candidate	Votes	%
Labour	Anna Burrage	1,568	49.5
Labour	Ajok Athian	1,375	43.4
Labour	Matt Cooper	1,343	42.4
Conservative	Alex Andrews	1,009	31.9
Conservative	Pierre Andrews	959	30.3
Conservative	Alexandra Marsanu	910	28.7
Green	Matthew Wrigley	647	20.4
Liberal Democrats	James Bowen	488	15.4
Liberal Democrats	Hinne Tuinstra	373	11.8
Independent	Phil Cowan	339	10.7
Turnout		3,167	36.5
Labour win (new seat)			
Labour win (new seat)			
Labour win (new seat)			

=== Regent's Park ===
Regent's Park (3 seats)
Party	Candidate	Votes	%
Labour	Heather Johnson*	1,552	63.4
Labour	Nadia Shah*	1,516	61.9
Labour	Nasim Ali*	1,504	61.4
Green	Hugo Plowden	423	17.3
Conservative	George Aspinall	413	16.9
Conservative	Joanna Reeves	390	15.9
Conservative	Martin Sheppard	355	14.5
Liberal Democrats	Mary Stanier	251	10.3
Liberal Democrats	Samuel Campling	206	8.4
Liberal Democrats	Christopher Gayford	188	7.7
Let London Live	Karin Radicke	114	4.7
Turnout		2,448	30.3
Labour win (new seat)			
Labour win (new seat)			
Labour win (new seat)			

=== South Hampstead ===
South Hampstead (3 seats)
Party	Candidate	Votes	%
Labour	Nina Parker	1,692	54.1
Labour	Izzy Lenga	1,655	52.9
Labour	Will Prince	1,564	50.0
Conservative	Don Williams	976	31.2
Conservative	Calvin Po	947	30.3
Conservative	Marx de Morais	931	29.8
Liberal Democrats	James Baker	436	13.9
Liberal Democrats	Aimery Roquefort	424	13.6
Liberal Democrats	Pranay Hariharan	376	12.0
Turnout		3,128	36.7
Labour win (new seat)			
Labour win (new seat)			
Labour win (new seat)			

=== St Pancras and Somers Town ===
St Pancras and Somers Town (3 seats)
Party	Candidate	Votes	%
Labour	Samata Khatoon*	1,874	68.8
Labour	Edmund Frondigoun	1,845	67.7
Labour	Shah Miah	1,799	66.0
Conservative	Alex Ellis	322	11.8
Liberal Democrats	Hannah Billington	299	11.0
Conservative	Carole Ricketts	290	10.6
Conservative	Axel Kaae	268	9.8
Workers Party	Awal Miah	239	8.8
Liberal Democrats	Stewart Jenkins	217	8.0
Workers Party	M D Shah	202	7.4
Workers Party	Neisha Wong	196	7.2
Liberal Democrats	Michael Pedersen	183	6.7
Turnout		2,724	32.9
Labour win (new seat)			
Labour win (new seat)			
Labour win (new seat)			

=== West Hampstead ===
West Hampstead (3 seats)
Party	Candidate	Votes	%	±%
Labour	Sharon Hardwick	1,332	46.2	+8.7
Labour	Nazma Rahman*	1,262	43.7	+2.3
Labour	Shiva Tiwari*	1,202	41.6	+3.9
Liberal Democrats	Janet Grauberg	1,164	40.3	+14.2
Liberal Democrats	David Elkan	964	33.4	+10.3
Liberal Democrats	Elizabeth Pearson	963	33.4	+11.9
Conservative	Ian Cohen	494	17.1	−10.9
Conservative	Marcos Gold	449	15.6	−8.8
Conservative	Peter Horne	407	14.1	−7.9
Turnout		2,886	35.8	−2.17
Labour hold		Swing	+9.8	
Labour hold		Swing	+5.5	
Labour hold		Swing	+ 5.9	

== By-elections 2022-2026 ==
=== Hampstead Town ===
Hampstead Town by-election, 7 July 2022
Party	Candidate	Votes	%	±%
Liberal Democrats	Linda Chung	919	40.9	▲17.3
Conservative	Alex Andrews	620	27.6	▼6.8
Labour Co-op	Alex Sufit	559	24.9	▼15.0
Green	Peter McGinty	104	4.6	N/A
Independent	Jonathan Livingstone	44	2.0	N/A
National Housing Party; No More Refugees	Patrick McGinnis	1	0.04	N/A
Majority		299	13.3	N/A
Turnout		2,247	37.6	▼5.7
Liberal Democrats gain from Labour Co-op		Swing	▲16.2	

=== South Hampstead ===
South Hampstead by-election, 1 June 2023
Party	Candidate	Votes	%	±%
Labour	Tommy Gale	882	35.7	▼14.3
Conservative	Don Williams	766	31.0	▼0.4
Liberal Democrats	Patrick Stillman	531	21.5	▲7.5
Green	Lorna Russell	295	11.9	N/A
Majority		116	4.7	N/A
Turnout		2,474	30.2	▼6.5
Labour hold		Swing	▼7.4	

=== Highgate ===
Highgate by-election, 30 November 2023
Party	Candidate	Votes	%	±%
Green	Lorna Russell	1,513	58.7	▲15.0
Labour	Tricia Leman	740	28.7	▼13.5
Conservative	Wakjira Feyesa	240	9.3	▼0.3
Liberal Democrats	Farrell Monk	84	3.3	▼1.3
Majority		773	30.0	N/A
Turnout		2,577	33.2	−15.8
Green hold		Swing	▲14.3	

The by-election was called following the resignation of Cllr Siân Berry.

=== Frognal ===
Frognal by-election, 2 May 2024
Party	Candidate	Votes	%	±%
Conservative	Steve Adams	1,103	49.8	+2.4
Labour	Simon Lickert	519	23.5	−0.9
Liberal Democrats	Sarah Hoyle	372	16.8	+2.7
Green	Charles Harris	219	9.9	−4.3
Majority		584	26.3	N/A
Turnout		2,213	41.6	+7.7
Conservative hold		Swing		

The Frognal by-election was triggered by the resignation of Conservative councillor Gio Spinella.

=== Camden Square ===
Camden Square by-election: 5 September 2024
Party	Candidate	Votes	%	±%
Labour	Tricia Leman	465	47.7	–27.8
Independent	Ali Farah	164	16.8	N/A
Green	James Dicker	133	13.7	N/A
Liberal Democrats	Alexander Matthews	89	9.1	–5.0
Independent	Jasper Warwick	75	7.7	N/A
Conservative	Esmerelda Akpoke	48	4.9	–5.5
Majority		301	30.9	N/A
Turnout		974	16.4	–15.4
Labour hold				

The Camden Square by-election was triggered by the resignation of Labour Councillor Danny Beales after his election to Parliament.

=== Kentish Town South ===
Kentish Town South by-election: 5 September 2024
Party	Candidate	Votes	%	±%
Labour	Joseph Ball	674	46.8	–12.0
Green	Alice Brown	327	22.7	+1.1
Independent	Muhammad Naser	289	20.1	N/A
Conservative	Shajib Ziffer	77	5.4	–2.4
Liberal Democrats	Tara Copeland	72	5.0	–3.0
Majority		347	24.1	N/A
Turnout		1,439	17.9	–17.9
Labour hold		Swing	▼6.6	

The Kentish Town South by-election was triggered by the resignation of Labour Councillor Georgia Gould after her election to Parliament.

=== Kilburn ===
Kilburn by-election: 5 September 2024
Party	Candidate	Votes	%	±%
Labour	Robert Thompson	583	51.5	–15.2
Conservative	Peter Hornsby	253	22.3	+4.2
Green	Michael Vieira	198	17.5	N/A
Liberal Democrats	David Elkan	98	8.7	–6.5
Majority		330	29.2	N/A
Turnout		1,132	13.1	–16.5
Labour hold		Swing	▼9.7	

The Kilburn by-election was triggered by the resignation of Labour Councillor Lloyd Hatton after his election to Parliament.

=== West Hampstead ===
West Hampstead by-election: 28 August 2025
Party	Candidate	Votes	%	±%
Liberal Democrats	Janet Grauberg	1,176	54.4	+15.4
Labour	Francesca Reynolds	458	21.2	−23.4
Conservative	Ian Cohen	222	10.3	−6.3
Reform	Thomas Sterling	155	7.2	New
Green	Matthew Hull	152	7.0	new
Majority		718	33.2	N/A
Turnout		2,163	26.4	−9.4
Liberal Democrats gain from Labour		Swing	▲38.8	
