= Frognal (disambiguation) =

Frognal may refer to:

- Frognal, an area of Hampstead, north-west London, England, and a road from Finchley Road to Hampstead
  - Finchley Road & Frognal railway station
  - Frognal (ward)
  - Frognal and Fitzjohns (ward)
- Frognal, Bexley, archaic place name located between Sidcup and Chislehurst in southeast London, England
  - Frognal House, a Jacobean mansion in southeast London, England
- Frognal, South Ayrshire, a location in South Ayrshire, Scotland
- Duke of Frognal, a fictional character in the 1954 film The Million Pound Note

== See also ==
- Frognall, a village in Lincolnshire, England
- Frognall, Melbourne, a house in Australia
