= Oliver Cooper (politician) =

British Conservative politician and party leader

Leader of the Opposition on Three Rivers Council
- In office 2023 – Present day
- Preceded by: Ciarán Reed

Leader of the Opposition on Camden Council
- In office 2018–2022
- Preceded by: Gio Spinella
- Succeeded by: Tom Simon

Camden councillor for Hampstead Town
- In office 2015–2022
- Preceded by: Simon Marcus
- Succeeded by: Adrian Cohen

Personal details
- Born: 1987 (age 38–39)
- Party: Conservative
- Education: University College London

Oliver Cooper (born 1987) is an English Conservative politician and a prominent party activist. He was the leader of the party on Camden London Borough Council representing Hampstead Town and is now a Conservative councillor and leader of the opposition on Three Rivers District Council in Hertfordshire.

== Career ==
Cooper attended Dr Challoner's Grammar School and University College London. He is a lawyer and a former journalist. In 2021, he moved from Stikeman Elliott to Charles Russell Speechlys with other members of Stoneman Elliott's international tax law team.

He was elected to represent Hampstead Town ward on Camden Council in 2015. Despite Hampstead voting 80% for "Remain" in the Brexit referendum in 2016, he voted for "Leave".

He became the Leader of the Opposition after the 2018 elections. Ahead of the 2022 Camden Borough elections, Cooper chose to move from his 'safe' Conservative ward to the Conservative–Liberal Democrat split ward of Belsize to try to increase his party's number of seats. He increased his party's share of the vote and came first among the Conservative candidates, but lost to the Lib Dems, ending his career in local government. Local newspapers said that he "almost certainly" would have held his Hampstead seat if he had not chosen to move to Belsize.

After his defeat, Cooper became the chairman of the Watford Conservatives. He was previously the deputy chairperson of the Hampstead and Kilburn Conservatives.

He was elected as a councillor in Hertfordshire in 2023. He was immediately elected the group leader on the council. In 2024 the Lib Dems lost their overall Majority on the council with the council going into No Overall Control, after the Tories won two byelections in a previously "safe" Liberal ward.

He served on Kemi Badenoch's successful campaign team in the 2024 Conservative Party leadership election. The Guardian uncovered private messages of him swearing to a fellow Tory activist in 2017 but despite this Badenoch stood by him, criticized the Guardian's attempt to "cancel" Cooper and said he was doing a "great job".

Cooper was "long-listed" for the Conservative Parliamentary selection in Cities of London and Westminster and "short-listed" in Hemel Hempstead, coming second.

He has appeared in the national news for campaigning to hire more police, highlighting some Labour members disrupting a minute's silence for Tessa Jowell, securing an official rebuke of Sadiq Khan for allegedly misusing crime statistics in 2018, attacking the Revolutionary Communist Group speaking in Camden Council, intervening and stopping Islamophobic violence on the London Underground in September 2019 and helping get rid of antisemitic graffiti in his area in December 2019. In 2022, The Times and The Daily Telegraph reported his criticism of censoring or removing statues in Camden of Mahatma Gandhi, Virginia Woolf, and other figures. He wrote in The Telegraph in 2015, unsuccessfully asking Conservatives not to vote for Jeremy Corbyn as Labour leader, which left-wing commentator Owen Jones later called a 'prophetic warning'.

He has written about international law for Conservative Home saying that the government should diverge from international law when it decides it is in Great Britain's interest.

Cooper was the national chairman of the Conservative youth organisation Conservative Future from 2013 to 2014. The Times reported that the organisation was "working really really well" until he was a victim of Mark Clarke in the nationally reported "Tatler Tory" bullying scandal. Cooper stood down after Clarke threatened to spread false rumours about him if he stood for re-election leading to Clarke replacing him with Clarke's lover. He had previously relaunched the European Young Conservatives.

== Revitalisation of Belsize Village ==
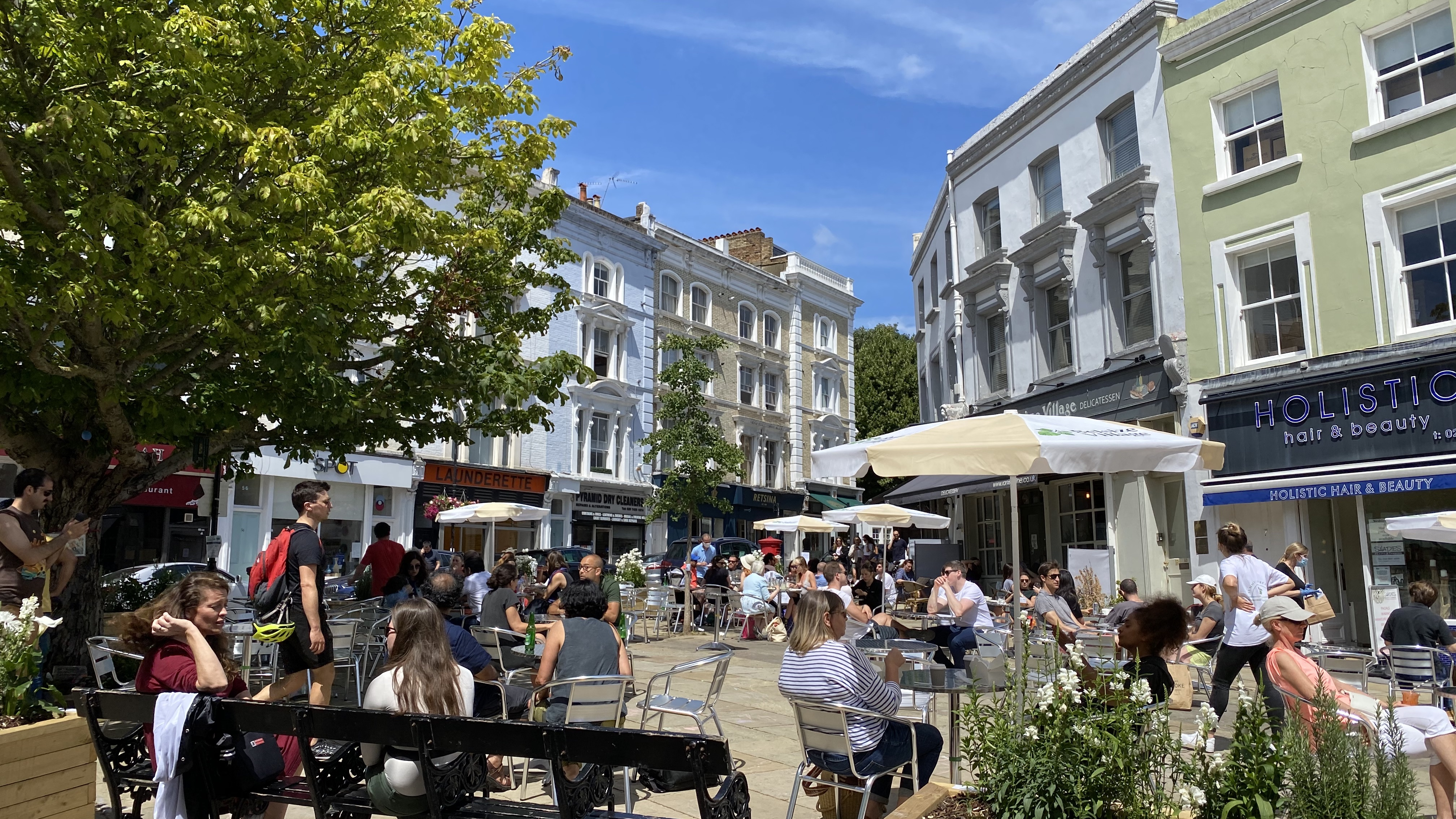
Belsize Village Streatery on July 19, 2020.

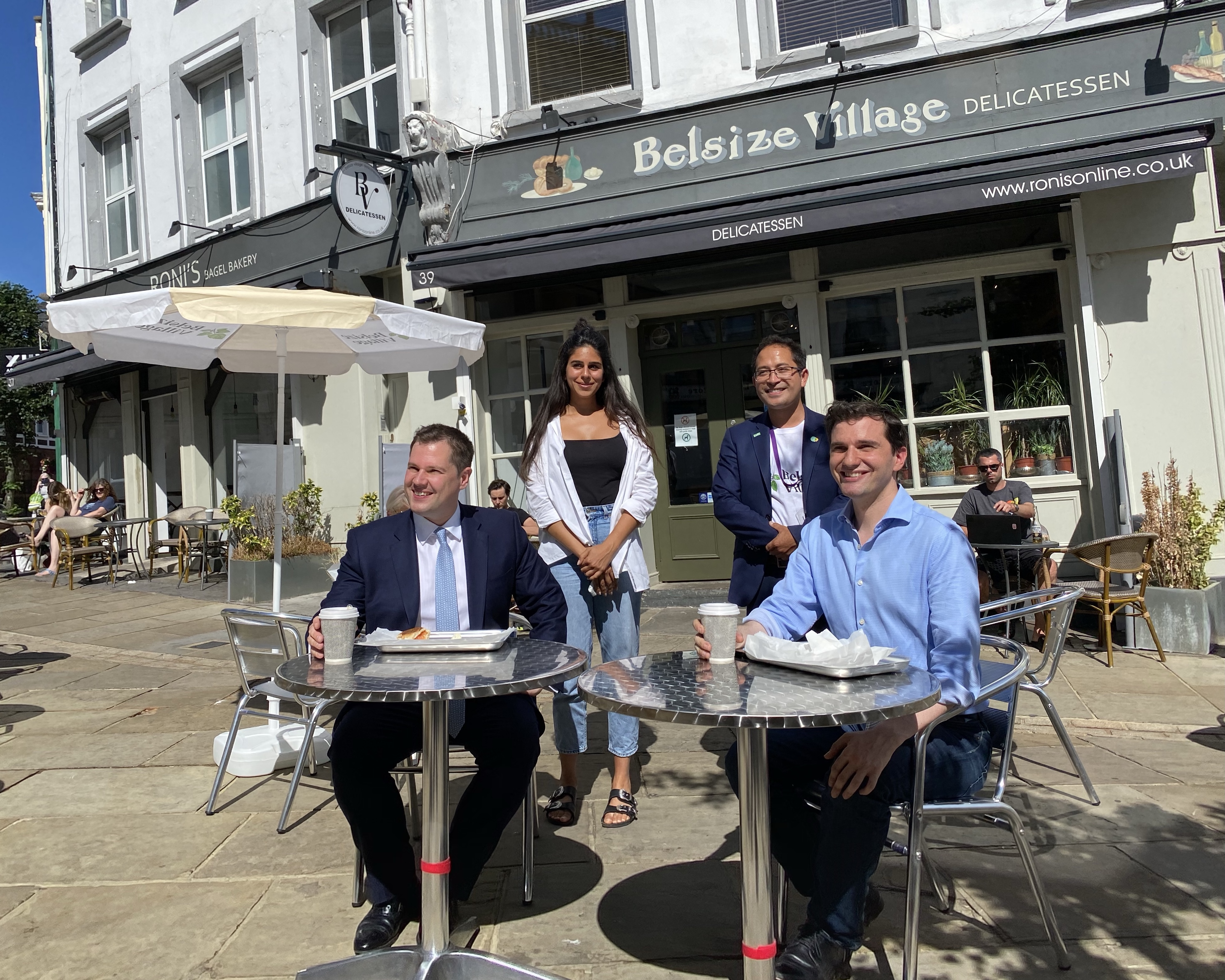
Ministerial visit to Belsize Village.

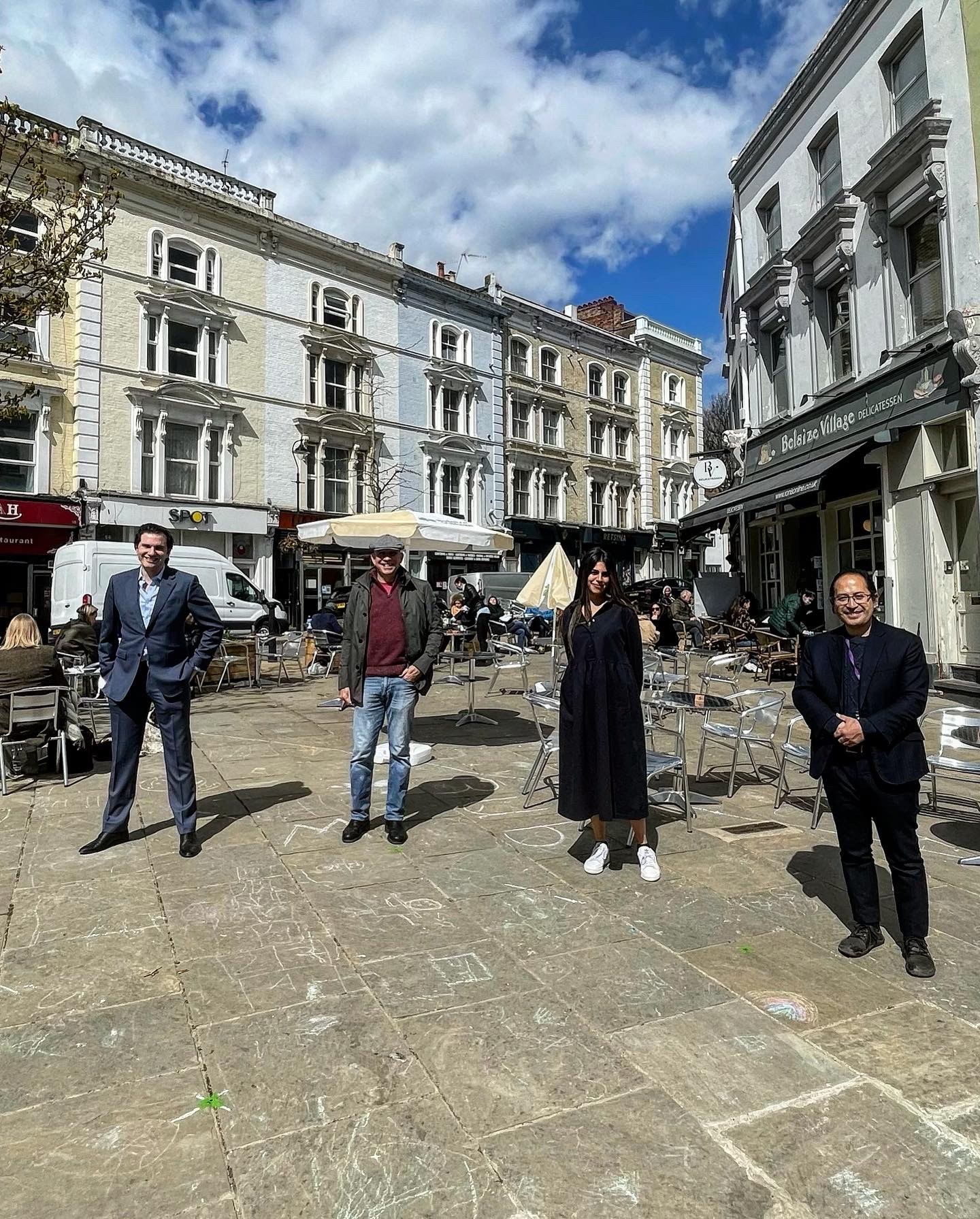
Oliver Cooper at the 2021 opening of the Belsize Village Streatery (its 2nd year of operation) on April 13, 2021.

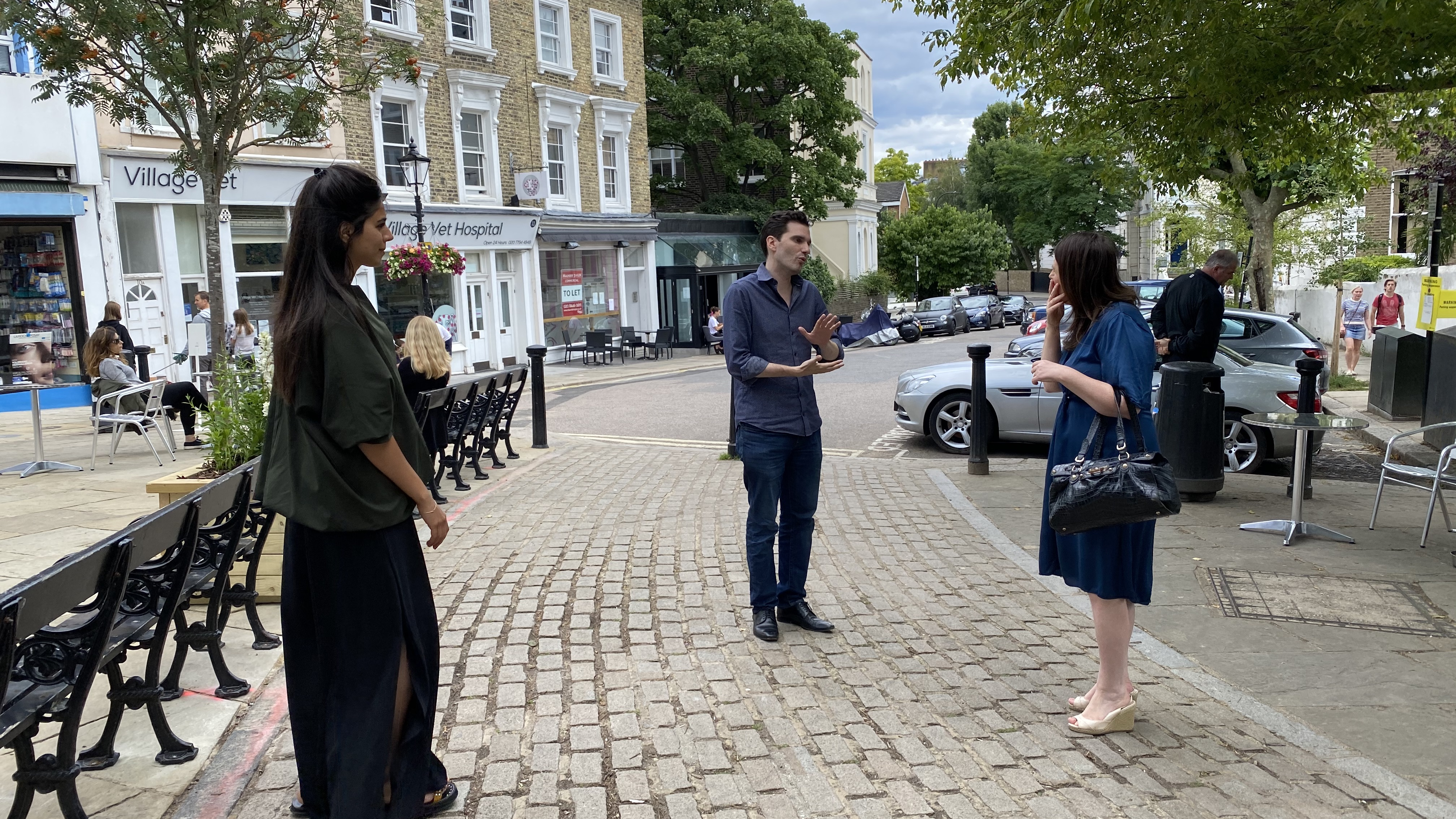
Oliver Cooper meeting with two of the streatery organisers: Belsize Village Business Association co-coordinator Aya Khazaal and Belsize Village Business Association head of gardening Jane Lyons on July 11, 2020.

As leader of the Conservative Group of Camden Council, Cooper supported the development of the Belsize Village Streatery in the summer of 2020 as a measure to mitigate the negative impacts of the COVID-19 pandemic on the local economy and help continue the revitalisation of the community started by the Belsize Village Business Association in October 2018. Cooper coordinated the release of £55,911 in community infrastructure levy (CIL) funds (£18,637 from each ward of Belsize, Frognal and Fitzjohns and Hampstead Town) to fund the Belsize Village Streatery. As the first scheme of its kind after the end of Lockdown 1 of COVID-19 restrictions in the UK, the Belsize Village Streatery received a ministerial visit on July 30, 2020 by then-Secretary of State Robert Jenrick, whose visit was hosted by Cooper.

According to the Belsize Village Business Association, the Belsize Village Streatery "helped save several businesses and over 100 local jobs." Data from Camden Council showed that amidst the height of the COVID-19 pandemic, spending in Belsize Village rose 111.6% year-on-year to August-Oct 2020 against an overall difficult economic backdrop. A 14-day consultation held by Camden Council in the summer of 2021 found that 91.5% of residents and businesses supported extending the Belsize Village Streatery. On 10 February 2022, Cooper spoke in favour of making the Belsize Village Streatery permanent at the Camden Council Licensing Committee; the permanence of the scheme was approved at the meeting. At the licensing committee, Cooper said, "The revitalisation of Belsize Village has been nothing short of a miracle in the last two years."

== Electoral results ==
Hampstead Town by-election, 7 May 2015
Party	Candidate	Votes	%	±%
Conservative	Oliver Cooper	2,693	50.9	▲8.0
Labour	Maddy Raman	1,381	26.1	▲4.8
Green	Sophie Dix	597	11.3	▼0.9
Liberal Democrats	Yannick Bultingaire	543	10.3	▼13.3
Independent	Nigel Rumble	73	1.4	N/A
Majority		1,312	24.8	
Turnout		5,287	67	
Conservative hold		Swing		

2018 Camden local election - Hampstead Town (3 seats)
Party	Candidate	Votes	%	±%
Conservative	Stephen Stark*	1,522	14.6%	▼0.7%
Conservative	Oliver Cooper*	1,455	14.0%	▼0.4%
Conservative	Maria Higson	1,400	13.6%	▲0.3%
Liberal Democrats	Linda Chung	1,247	12.0%	Steady
Labour	Sue Cullinan	898	8.6%	▲1.0%
Liberal Democrats	Andrew Haslam Jones	879	8.5%	▲2.5%
Liberal Democrats	Will Coles	826	7.9%	▲2.3%
Labour	Sunny Mandich	811	7.8%	▲0.4%
Labour	James Slater	799	7.7%	▲1.4%
Green	Richard Dunham Bourne	243	2.3%	▼3.0%
Green	Michael Wulff Pawlyn	175	1.7%	▼2.1%
Green	Ramsay Short	135	1.3%	▼1.7%
Majority		153	1.5%	▲0.2%
Turnout		10,390	46.5%	▲2.8%
Conservative hold		Swing		
Conservative hold		Swing		
Conservative hold		Swing		

2022 Camden local election - Belsize (3 seats)
Party	Candidate	Votes	%	±%
Liberal Democrats	Tom Simon*	1,494	47.4%	▲12.3%
Liberal Democrats	Judy Dixey	1,445	45.7%	▲12.7%
Liberal Democrats	Matthew Kirk	1,317	41.7%	▲10.1%
Conservative	Oliver Cooper†	1,124	35.6%	▲2.8%
Conservative	Steve Adams*	1,106	35.0%	▲1.3%
Conservative	Aarti Joshi	953	30.2%	▼2.4%
Labour	Issy Waite	705	22.3%	▼7.6%
Labour	Shaheen Ahmed Chowdhury	692	21.9%	▼6.0%
Labour	Peter Ptashko	644	20.4%	▼6.8%
Turnout			38.4	
Liberal Democrats win (new seat)				
Liberal Democrats win (new seat)				
Liberal Democrats win (new seat)				

2023 Three Rivers District Council election - Chorleywood North and Sarratt ward
Party	Candidate	Votes	%	±%
Conservative	Oliver Cooper	1,081	58.8	▲3.3
Liberal Democrats	Frank Mahon-Daly	517	28.1	▼4.3
Green	Peter Loader	130	7.1	▲0.6
Labour	Margaret Gallagher	111	6.0	▲0.5
Majority		564	30.7	+7.6
Turnout		1,479	26.0	–2.9
Registered electors		5,681		
Conservative hold		Swing	▲3.8	
