= Henry Newman (political adviser) =

British political adviser

Chief of Staff to the Leader of the Opposition
- Incumbent
- Assumed office 22 July 2025
- Leader: Kemi Badenoch
- Preceded by: Lee Rowley

Member of Camden London Borough Council for Frognal and Fitzjohns
- In office 3 May 2018 – 5 May 2022 Serving with Andrew Parkinson; Gio Spinella
- Preceded by: Siobhan Baillie; Andrew Mennear; Gio Spinella
- Succeeded by: Andrew Parkinson (Frognal); Gio Spinella (Frognal); Tom Simon (Belsize); Judy Dixey (Belsize); Matthew Kirk (Belsize)

Personal details
- Party: Conservative
- Education: Christ Church, Oxford; Harvard University; London School of Economics
- Occupation: Political adviser

Henry Newman is a British political adviser. He has served as Chief of Staff to the Leader of the Opposition, Kemi Badenoch, since July 2025. Previously he has served as a senior adviser to Prime Minister Boris Johnson, Michael Gove and Francis Maude. He also served as a councillor on Camden London Borough Council.

== Early life ==
Newman's grandmothers were an Istanbul-born Greek, and a German Jew who fled the Nazis, before training as a doctor at the Royal Free Hospital.

Newman was an undergraduate at Christ Church, Oxford. He later studied at Harvard University and the London School of Economics.

== Career ==
Newman taught politics and history at various universities, including politics at SOAS University of London, before working in Whitehall under Prime Minister David Cameron during the Conservative–Liberal Democrat coalition. He worked on Government efficiency and prison reform and was promoted through various roles as a special adviser. Newman worked for Francis Maude at the Cabinet Office.

Newman was hired by Michael Gove as a departmental adviser at the Ministry of Justice when Maude lost the right to have special advisers after the 2015 general election. Newman was a special adviser to Gove, and was reported to have been a protégé of Gove. Newman worked on the Vote Leave campaign in the run-up to the 2016 EU referendum. He was said to have helped convince Gove to withdraw his support for Boris Johnson during the 2016 Conservative Party leadership election and run himself. Under Prime Minister Theresa May, he joined and was director of the think tank Open Europe, being seen as an influential supporter of May's Brexit plan.

In the 2018 Camden Council election, Newman was elected as a Conservative candidate in Frognal and Fitzjohns ward.

Following the election of Johnson as Prime Minister, Newman worked for Gove at the Cabinet Office. In November 2020, Newman was falsely accused of erasing his mobile phone call log during an investigation into a COVID-19 lockdown leak. He was the target of a campaign designed to put him under suspicion of leaking Government plans for a second COVID-19 lockdown to newspapers. In April 2021, Dominic Cummings alleged he had been told by the cabinet secretary that Newman was likely to have been the leaker in October 2020, when he was an adviser at the Cabinet Office. Cummings alleged that the prime minister had been told that "all the evidence" pointed to Newman, whom Cummings described as a "chatty rat". Newman denied the accusation.

Newman worked as a senior adviser to Johnson, after being considered to be elevated to the role by Johnson's wife Carrie. In October 2021, it was reported by the Camden New Journal that Newman had told colleagues of his intention to depart Camden Council.

On 7 February 2022, after a "mutually agreed decision" with Johnson, he left his role at 10 Downing Street to become an adviser to Gove at the Department for Levelling Up, Housing and Communities. Johnson had been urged to move Newman away from his role over accusations—strongly denied by Number 10—that Carrie was influencing Johnson's appointments and Government policy.

Newman did not contest the 2022 Camden Council election. In 2024, he applied to be the Conservative candidate in Bexhill and Battle to succeed Huw Merriman in the 2024 general election, but was defeated by Crewe and Nantwich MP Kieran Mullan. He launched a Substack blog after the general election, which the Conservatives lost, called The Whitehall Project. In November 2024, Newman was appointed Deputy Chief of Staff to Kemi Badenoch, the leader of the Conservative Party and Opposition. In July 2025, he was promoted to Chief of Staff.

== Personal life ==
Newman's partner is academic Guglielmo Verdirame, Baron Verdirame. The couple live in Hampstead, London.
