= Hampstead Town (ward) =

Electoral ward in London, England

- Electoral ward for the Camden London Borough Council
- Hampstead Town ward boundaries since 2022
- Borough: Camden
- County: Greater London
- Population: 12,430 (1966); 8,016 (2021) (Note: 2021 census data reported for 2022 ward boundaries)
- Electorate: 8,630 (1964); 4,791 (1978); 7,438 (2002); 5,964 (2022)
- Area: 2.819 square kilometres (1.088 sq mi) (1968); 2.181 square kilometres (0.842 sq mi) (2022)

Current electoral ward
- Created: 1965
- Councillors: 1965–1971: 3; 1971–1978: 4; 1978–2002: 2; 2002–2022: 3; 2022–present: 2
- ONS code: 00AGGL (2002–2022)
- GSS code: E05000135 (2002–2022); E05013659 (2022–present)

Hampstead Town is a ward in the London Borough of Camden, in the United Kingdom. It covers most of Hampstead Village, the western half of Hampstead Heath, North End and the Vale of Health. The more residential Frognal ward covers much of the rest of Hampstead.

The ward has existed since the creation of the borough on 1 April 1965 and was first used in the 1964 elections. The boundaries were redrawn in May 1971, May 1978, May 2002 and May 2022. In the most recent set of changes, the southernmost area of the ward was transferred to Belsize and Gospel Oak wards, and the number of councillors was reduced from three to two. The ward's current boundaries have been in effect since the 2022 election, and the ward's three polling stations are at Burgh House, Fitzjohn's Primary School and Keats Community Library. In 2018, the ward had an electorate of 6,214. The Boundary Commission projects the electorate to rise to 6,328 in 2025.

The ward has historically been represented by either Conservative or Liberal Democrat councillors. The first Liberal Democrat councillors, Margaret Little and John Dickie, were elected in May 1994. Dickie, however, had taken the Labour whip by December 1995, to the surprise of the Liberal Democrat group leader, Flick Rea, who called for him to stand down. He continued as a councillor for the ward until the 1998 election, when he was elected as a Labour councillor in Grafton. In May 2022, Adrian Cohen became the ward's first elected Labour councillor. However, Cohen announced 21 days after the election that he would not be taking up his seat on the council, forcing a by-election to be held on 7 July 2022. Former Liberal Democrat councillor Linda Chung was elected in Cohen's place.

The ward's notable councillors have included two Conservative leaders of the opposition, Alan Greengross (1974–1978) and Oliver Cooper (2015–2022), Archie Macdonald, former Liberal MP for Roxburgh and Selkirk and Labour councillor Adrian Cohen, who founded the London Jewish Forum.

== List of councillors ==
The ward was initially represented by three councillors. This increased to four between 1971 and 1978, before being reduced to two between 1978 and 2002. From 2002 to 2022, the ward was represented by three councillors. This reverted to two councillor representation from 2022, as a result of boundary changes.

Term	Councillor	Party
1964–1971	Elizabeth Knight	Conservative
1964–1974	Arthur Roome	Conservative
1964–1968	Luigi Denza	Conservative
1968–1971	Peter Smith	Conservative
1974–1976	Archie Macdonald	Conservative
1974–1978	Alan Greengross	Conservative
1974–1982	Gwyneth Williams	Conservative
1974–1978	John Ratzer	Conservative
1976–1978	Stephen Rowlinson	Conservative
1976–1982	Ian Tommison	Conservative
1982–1986	Julian Harrison	Conservative
1982–1986	Anthony Robinson	Conservative
1986–1990	Jacqueline Jones	Conservative
1986–1989	Selina Gee	Conservative
1989–1994	Rita Pomfret	Conservative
1990–1994	Maureen Braun	Conservative
1994–2006	Margaret Little	Liberal Democrats
1994–1998	John Dickie (Note: John Dickie changed parties in 1995)	Liberal Democrats
1994–1998	John Dickie	Labour
1998–2002	Sidney Malin	Liberal Democrats
2002–2008	Mike Greene	Conservative
2002–2006	Brian Cattell	Conservative
2006–2012	Kirsty Roberts	Conservative
2006–2014	Chris Knight	Conservative
2008–2014	Linda Chung	Liberal Democrats
2022–present	Linda Chung	Liberal Democrats
2012–2015	Simon Marcus	Conservative
2014–present	Stephen Stark	Conservative
2014–2018	Tom Currie	Conservative
2015–2022	Oliver Cooper	Conservative
2018–2022	Maria Higson	Conservative
2022–2022	Adrian Cohen	Labour

== Camden council elections since 2022 ==
Location of the Hampstead Town ward in Camden since 2022

There was a revision of ward boundaries in Camden in 2022. Hampstead Town lost territory to the south to Belsize and Gospel Oak wards. Councillors representing Hampstead Town decreased from three to two.

=== 2026 election ===
The election took place on 7 May 2026.

2026 Camden London Borough Council election: Hampstead Town
Party	Candidate	Votes	%	±%
Liberal Democrats	Linda Chung*	1,221		
Conservative	Stephen Stark*	1,069		
Liberal Democrats	Aimery de Malet Roquefort	960		
Conservative	Amanda Sefton	814		
Labour	Anna Burrage	492		
Green	Laura Rohde	388		
Green	Justin Hoffman	333		
Labour	Michael Williams	320		
Reform	Laura Phillips	190		
Turnout			48.14	+4.84
Liberal Democrats hold		Swing		
Conservative hold		Swing		

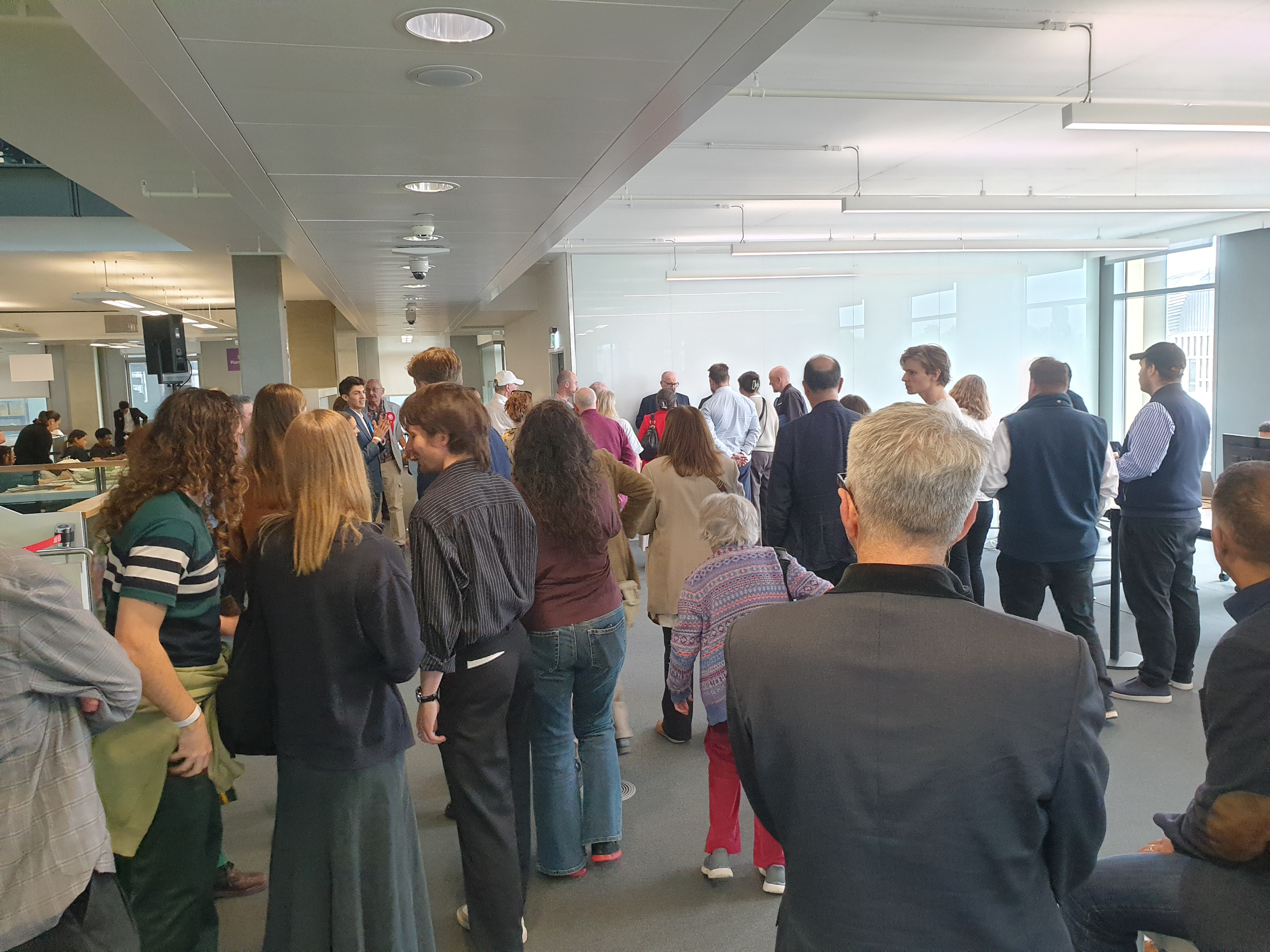
Candidates and party agents being briefed on the result in Hampstead Town ward before the official declaration. Photo taken at the Camden elections count on 8 May 2026.

=== 2022 by-election ===
The by-election took place on 7 July 2022, following the resignation of Adrian Cohen.

2022 Hampstead Town by-election
Party	Candidate	Votes	%	±%
Liberal Democrats	Linda Chung	919	41.0	+20.8
Conservative	Alex Andrews	620	27.6	−10.7
Labour Co-op	Alex Sufit	559	24.9	−13.9
Green	Peter John McGinty	104	4.6	+4.6
Independent	Jonathan Livingstone	44	2.0	+2.0
National Housing Party No More Refugees	Patrick McGinnis	1	0.0	0
Turnout		2,247	37.6	
Liberal Democrats gain from Labour				

=== 2022 election ===
The election took place on 5 May 2022.

2022 Camden London Borough Council election: Hampstead Town
Party	Candidate	Votes	%	±%
Conservative	Stephen Stark	1,089	42.2	
Labour Co-op	Adrian Cohen	1,030	39.9	
Labour Co-op	Alexandra Sufit	971	37.6	
Conservative	Deborah Dor	887	34.4	
Liberal Democrats	Anne Ward	609	23.6	
Liberal Democrats	Nicholas Russell	435	16.9	
Turnout		2,581	43.3	
Conservative win (new boundaries)				
Labour win (new boundaries)				

== 2002–2022 Camden council elections ==
Hampstead Town ward boundaries from 2002 to 2022

There was a revision of ward boundaries in Camden in 2002. Councillors representing Hampstead Town increased from two to three.

=== 2018 election ===
The election took place on 3 May 2018.

2018 Camden London Borough Council election: Hampstead Town
Party	Candidate	Votes	%	±%
Conservative	Stephen Stark	1,522	14.6%	▼0.7%
Conservative	Oliver Cooper	1,455	14.0%	▼0.4%
Conservative	Maria Higson	1,400	13.6%	▲0.3%
Liberal Democrats	Linda Chung	1,247	12.0%	Steady
Labour	Sue Cullinan	898	8.6%	▲1.0%
Liberal Democrats	Andrew Haslam Jones	879	8.5%	▲2.5%
Liberal Democrats	Will Coles	826	7.9%	▲2.3%
Labour	Sunny Mandich	811	7.8%	▲0.4%
Labour	James Slater	799	7.7%	▲1.4%
Green	Richard Dunham Bourne	243	2.3%	▼3.0%
Green	Michael Wulff Pawlyn	175	1.7%	▼2.1%
Green	Ramsay Short	135	1.3%	▼1.7%
Majority		153	1.5%	▲0.2%
Turnout		10,390	46.5%	▲2.8%
Conservative hold		Swing		
Conservative hold		Swing		
Conservative hold		Swing		

=== 2015 by-election ===
The by-election took place on 7 May 2015, following the resignation of Simon Marcus.

2015 Hampstead Town by-election
Party	Candidate	Votes	%	±%
Conservative	Oliver Cooper	2,693	50.9	▲8.0
Labour	Maddy Raman	1,381	26.1	▲4.8
Green	Sophie Dix	597	11.3	▼0.9
Liberal Democrats	Yannick Bultingaire	543	10.3	▼13.3
Independent	Nigel Rumble	73	1.4	N/A
Majority		1,312	24.8	
Turnout		5,287	67	
Conservative hold		Swing		

=== 2014 election ===
The election took place on 22 May 2014.

2014 Camden London Borough Council election: Hampstead Town
Party	Candidate	Votes	%	±%
Conservative	Simon Marcus	1,465	15.3%	
Conservative	Stephen Stark	1,380	14.4%	
Conservative	Tom Currie	1,272	13.3%	
Liberal Democrats	Linda Chung	1,148	12.0%	
Labour	Rachel Agnew	726	7.6%	
Labour	Maddy Raman	711	7.4%	
Labour	Luca Salice	609	6.3%	
Liberal Democrats	James Newsome	575	6.0%	
Liberal Democrats	Robert Carruthers	542	5.6%	
Green	Sophie Dix	512	5.3%	
Green	Maisie King	365	3.8%	
Green	Prashant Bhaskar Vaze	288	3.0%	
Majority		124	1.3%	
Turnout		9,593	43.7%	
Conservative hold		Swing		
Conservative hold		Swing		
Conservative gain from Liberal Democrats		Swing		

=== 2012 by-election ===
The by-election took place on 27 September 2012, following the resignation of Kirsty Roberts.

2012 Hampstead Town by-election
Party	Candidate	Votes	%	±%
Conservative	Simon Marcus	1,040	42.4%	▲1.9
Liberal Democrats	Jeffrey Fine	695	28.3%	▼7.3
Labour	Maddy Raman	512	20.9%	▲4.5
Green	Sophie Dix	207	8.4%	▲1.0
Majority		345	14.1%	
Turnout		2,454	29.6%	
Conservative hold		Swing		

=== 2010 election ===
The election on 6 May 2010 took place on the same day as the United Kingdom general election.

2010 Camden London Borough Council election: Hampstead Town
Party	Candidate	Votes	%	±%
Conservative	Chris Knight	2,261	40.9	−3.4
Liberal Democrats	Linda Chung	2,198	39.7	+6.5
Conservative	Kirsty Roberts	2,159	39.0	−6.3
Conservative	Stephen Stark	2,006	36.3	−14.5
Liberal Democrats	David Bouchier	1,775	32.1	−3.6
Liberal Democrats	Ian Harrison	1,681	30.4	+3.4
Labour	Janet Guthrie	1,113	20.1	+7.8
Labour	Tom Tabori	757	13.7	+2.2
Labour	Suhel Islam	728	13.2	+2.6
Green	Stuart Houghton	528	9.5	+0.4
Green	Ian Patton	349	6.3	−1.6
Green	Prashant Vaze	303	5.5	−0.4
Turnout		5,533	69.4	+20.2
Conservative hold		Swing		
Liberal Democrats gain from Conservative		Swing		
Conservative hold		Swing		

=== 2008 by-election ===
The by-election was held on 25 September 2008, following the resignation of Mike Greene.

2008 Hampstead Town by-election
Party	Candidate	Votes	%	±%
Liberal Democrats	Linda Chung	1,242	44.1	+11.5
Conservative	Stephen Phillips	1,114	39.6	−6.9
Labour	Larraine Revah	289	10.3	−1.0
Green	Anya Reeve	140	5.0	−3.3
BNP	Stephen Dorman	30	1.0	+1.0
Majority		128	4.5	
Turnout		2,814	36.7	
Liberal Democrats gain from Conservative		Swing		

=== 2006 election ===
The election took place on 4 May 2006.

2006 Camden London Borough Council election: Hampstead Town
Party	Candidate	Votes	%	±%
Conservative	Mike Greene	1,842	50.8	+5.1
Conservative	Kirsty Roberts	1,641	45.3	+7.5
Conservative	Christopher Knight	1,605	44.3	+7.3
Liberal Democrats	Ed Fordham	1,293	35.7	−2.7
Liberal Democrats	Linda Chung	1,204	33.2	−0.6
Liberal Democrats	Jonathan Fryer	980	27.0	−0.8
Labour	Hugh Gracey	446	12.3	−2.6
Labour	Myra Carr	418	11.5	−1.4
Labour	Paul Tomlinson	384	10.6	−1.4
Green	Brian Gascoigne	328	9.1	−3.0
Green	Charlotte Collins	287	7.9	−3.2
Green	Una Sapietis	214	5.9	−5.1
Independent	Brian Kettell	52	1.4	−36.4
Turnout		10,694	49.2	
Conservative hold		Swing		
Conservative gain from Liberal Democrats		Swing		
Conservative hold		Swing		

=== 2002 election ===
The election took place on 2 May 2002.

2002 Camden London Borough Council election: Hampstead Town
Party	Candidate	Votes	%	±%
Conservative	Mike Greene	1,316	45.7	
Liberal Democrats	Margaret Little	1,106	38.4	
Conservative	Brian Cattell	1,089	37.8	
Conservative	Katharine Steel	1,064	37.0	
Liberal Democrats	Louise Malin	974	33.8	
Liberal Democrats	Martin Wright	800	27.8	
Labour	Neil Crundwell	430	14.9	
Labour	Harunur Rashid	372	12.9	
Green	Brian Gascoigne	349	12.1	
Labour	Mohammed Islam	345	12.0	
Green	Frances Mortimer	321	11.1	
Green	Dorothy Forsyth	316	11.0	
Turnout		8,482		
Conservative win (new boundaries)				
Liberal Democrats win (new boundaries)				
Conservative win (new boundaries)				

== 1978–2002 Camden council elections ==
Location of the Hampstead Town ward in Camden from 1978 to 2002

There was a revision of ward boundaries in Camden in 1978. Councillors representing Hampstead Town decreased from four to two.

=== 1998 election ===
The election took place on 7 May 1998.

1998 Camden London Borough Council election: Hampstead Town
Party	Candidate	Votes	%	±%
Liberal Democrats	Margaret Little	1,028		
Liberal Democrats	Sidney Malin	912		
Conservative	Roderick Anderson	368		
Conservative	Michael Bottom	354		
Labour	Mark Leonard	301		
Labour	Rudolph Champagne	259		
Turnout		3,222	40.8	
Liberal Democrats hold		Swing		
Liberal Democrats hold		Swing		

=== 1994 election ===
The election took place on 5 May 1994.

1994 Lambeth London Borough Council election: Hampstead Town
Party	Candidate	Votes	%	±%
Liberal Democrats	Margaret Little	1,005		
Liberal Democrats	John Dickie	969		
Conservative	Helen Sinclair	471		
Conservative	Maureen Braun	466		
Labour	Janet Guthrie	97		
Labour	Simon Fitzpatrick	97		
Green	Katharina Wolfe	97		
Turnout			51.0%	
Liberal Democrats gain from Conservative		Swing		
Liberal Democrats gain from Conservative		Swing		

=== 1990 election ===
The election took place on 3 May 1990.

1990 Camden London Borough Council election: Hampstead Town
Party	Candidate	Votes	%	±%
Conservative	Maureen Braun	643		
Conservative	Rita Pomfret	620		
Liberal Democrats	David Brierley	619		
Liberal Democrats	John Dickie	549		
Labour	John Saynor	432		
Labour	Anna Wernher	397		
Green	John Penney	219		
Turnout				
Conservative hold		Swing		
Conservative hold		Swing		

=== 1989 by-election ===
The by-election took place on 26 January 1989, following the resignation of Selina Gee.

1989 Hampstead Town by-election
Party	Candidate	Votes	%	±%
Conservative	Rita Pomfret	533		
Liberal Democrats	David Brierley	373		
Labour	Myra Polya	239		
Turnout				
Conservative hold		Swing		

=== 1986 election ===
The election took place on 8 May 1986.

1986 Camden London Borough Council election: Hampstead Town
Party	Candidate	Votes	%	±%
Conservative	Jacqueline Jones	788		
Conservative	Selina Gee	787		
Alliance	David Brierley	695		
Alliance	David Aarons	672		
Labour	David Bookless	564		
Labour	Heather Kenmure	517		
Turnout				
Conservative hold		Swing		
Conservative hold		Swing		

=== 1982 election ===
The election took place on 6 May 1982.

1982 Camden London Borough Council election: Hampstead Town
Party	Candidate	Votes	%	±%
Conservative	Julian Harrison	992		
Conservative	Anthony Robinson	962		
Alliance	David Birkett	676		
Alliance	Brian Sugden	627		
Labour	Eric Mitchell	463		
Labour	James Murphy	445		
Turnout				
Conservative hold		Swing		
Conservative hold		Swing		

=== 1978 election ===
The election took place on 4 May 1978.

1978 Camden London Borough Council election: Hampstead Town
Party	Candidate	Votes	%	±%
Conservative	Ian Tommison	1,251		
Conservative	Gwyneth Williams	1,234		
Labour	Philip Grenall	647		
Labour	David Bookless	628		
Liberal	Nigel Barnes	297		
Save London Alliance	Anthony Diamond	61		
Turnout				
Conservative win (new boundaries)				
Conservative win (new boundaries)				

== 1971–1978 Camden council elections ==
There was a revision of ward boundaries in Camden in 1971. Councillors representing Hampstead Town increased from three to four.

=== 1976 by-election ===
The by-election took place on 15 July 1976, following the resignation of Archie Macdonald.

1976 Hampstead Town by-election
Party	Candidate	Votes	%	±%
Conservative	Stephen Rowlinson	1,743		
Labour	James Parish	548		
Liberal	Nigel Barnes	376		
Turnout			28.4	
Conservative hold		Swing		

=== 1974 election ===
The election took place on 2 May 1974.

1974 Camden London Borough Council election: Hampstead Town
Party	Candidate	Votes	%	±%
Conservative	Archie Macdonald	1,980		
Conservative	Alan Greengross	1,956		
Conservative	Gwyneth Williams	1,924		
Conservative	John Ratzer	1,902		
Labour	John Darlington	1,141		
Labour	Lord George Archibald	1,137		
Labour	James Parish	1,132		
Labour	John Rigby	1,087		
Liberal	Sarah Khuner	557		
Liberal	Nicholas Salmon	548		
Liberal	Marion Friedmann	523		
Liberal	Raymond Benad	494		
Communist	Elizabeth Tate	152		
Save London Action Group	Andrew Urquhart	73		
Save London Action Group	Charles Carey	57		
Save London Action Group	Robert Fysh	53		
Turnout				
Conservative hold		Swing		
Conservative hold		Swing		
Conservative hold		Swing		
Conservative hold		Swing		

=== 1971 election ===
The election took place on 13 May 1971.

1971 Camden London Borough Council election: Hampstead Town
Party	Candidate	Votes	%	±%
Conservative	James Lemkin	2,073		
Conservative	Archie Macdonald	2,071		
Conservative	Harriet Greenaway	2,064		
Conservative	Arthur Roome	1,996		
Labour	Alix Maxwell	1,574		
Labour	Roger Robinson	1,537		
Labour	Edwin Rhodes	1,511		
Labour	Keith Atkins	1,501		
Liberal	David Sacker	360		
Liberal	Bonamy Bradby	337		
Communist	Elizabeth Tate	258		
Turnout				
Conservative win (new boundaries)				
Conservative win (new boundaries)				
Conservative win (new boundaries)				
Conservative win (new boundaries)				

== 1964–1971 Camden council elections ==
=== 1968 election ===
The election took place on 9 May 1968.

1968 Camden London Borough Council election: Hampstead Town
Party	Candidate	Votes	%	±%
Conservative	Elizabeth Knight	2,191	57.9	
Conservative	Arthur Roome	2,162		
Conservative	Peter Smith	2,119		
Labour	Anthony Clarke	987	25.9	
Labour	Jennifer Keohane	958		
Labour	Phyllis Hymans	946		
Liberal	Archie Macdonald	587	14.4	
Liberal	George Willett	532		
Liberal	Sarah Khuner	491		
Communist	Elizabeth Tate	200	1.8	
Turnout			40.6	
Conservative hold		Swing		
Conservative hold		Swing		
Conservative hold		Swing		

=== 1964 election ===
The election took place on 7 May 1964.

1964 Camden London Borough Council election: Hampstead Town
Party	Candidate	Votes	%	±%
Conservative	Elizabeth Knight	1,961		
Conservative	Arthur Roome	1,955		
Conservative	Luigi Denza	1,947		
Labour	P. Hymans	1,146		
Labour	Thomas Mahoney	1,127		
Labour	Janek Langer	1,121		
Liberal	Pamela Frankau	694		
Liberal	Sarah Khuner	668		
Liberal	Archie Macdonald	656		
Turnout		3,783	43.8	
Conservative win (new seat)				
Conservative win (new seat)				
Conservative win (new seat)				
