= Blackboy Clock =

Clock in Stroud

Coordinates: 51°44′38″N 2°12′48″W

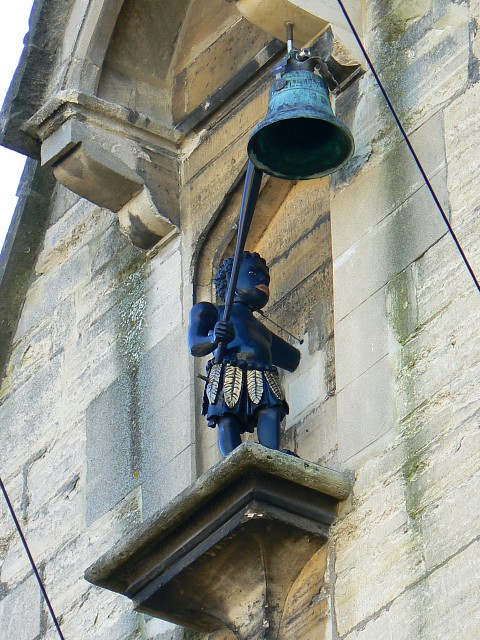
Blackboy Clock

The Blackboy Clock is a clock in Stroud, Gloucestershire, England. It is a jacquemart (jack clock), incorporating a figurine of a black boy with a club that strikes the hours.

== History ==
The clock was made in 1774, and is possibly one of only twenty examples of a jacquemart in the UK. Originally installed in a watchmaker's shop on the High Street, after the death of its then owner in 1834 it was moved to the Duke of York pub in Nelson Street. In 1884, it was moved again to the National School for Girls building, later named Blackboys School.

Blackboys School was closed in the 1960s, becoming a teacher's training centre. The building was Grade II listed in 1974, and in the 1990s converted into residential apartments called Blackboy House.

== Proposed removal ==
A report commissioned by Stroud District Council in 2021 stated, "Whatever the inspiration or its origins, it has to be remembered that, without a doubt, the boy's image came directly or indirectly through the influence of slavery and colonialism." In a subsequent consultation, 78% of the 1,680 respondents stated that the figurine should be removed, with 59% wishing it to be moved to a museum. In April 2022, the council recommended that the clock be removed and offered to a museum. An article in The Spectator expressed concern at this, arguing that the figurine was a "local landmark" and "expression of vernacular craftsmanship" with no demonstrable links to slavery. Local MP Siobhan Baillie also opposed the clock's removal, saying, "The best way to really get people to understand our history is to leave all statues in place and commission others to reflect our country's journey in the 20th and 21st centuries toward equality."

Any decision about the clock's future is complicated by its being owned by a trust, not the local council. Any action would have to be approved by Historic England, which would need to know where it was to go. Museums resist accepting items with restrictions, however, leading to what has been described as a "Catch-22" situation.
