= Guglielmo Verdirame, Baron Verdirame =

British-Italian barrister, legal scholar and life peer (born 1971)

The Right Honourable The Lord Verdirame KC

Member of the House of Lords
- Lord Temporal
- Life peerage 2 November 2022

Personal details
- Born: 25 August 1971 (age 55) Reggio di Calabria, Italy
- Party: none (non-affiliated)
- Domestic partner: Henry Newman

Academic background
- Education: Liceo Classico Tommaso Campanella; United World College of the Adriatic
- Alma mater: University of Bologna (Laurea in Giurisprudenza); SOAS, University of London (LLM); London School of Economics (PhD)
- Thesis: UN accountability for violations of human rights (2001)
- Doctoral advisor: Christine Chinkin

Academic work
- Discipline: legal scholar
- Sub-discipline: international law
- Institutions: Merton College, Oxford; University of Cambridge; King's College London

Guglielmo Verdirame, Baron Verdirame, KC (born 25 August 1971) is an Italian-born British legal scholar and barrister who was appointed a life peer in 2022. In the House of Lords he sits as a non-affiliated member.

He was previously a Junior Research Fellow at Merton College, Oxford, a university lecturer in law at the University of Cambridge Faculty of Law, a Fellow of the Lauterpacht Centre for International Law, a visiting fellow at Harvard Law School, and a visiting professor at Columbia Law School. He is a dual national (British and Italian), and was born in Reggio di Calabria, Italy.

== Career ==
He is Professor of International Law at King's College London in the Department of War Studies and the School of Law. He practises as a barrister at 20 Essex Street Chambers and was appointed Queen's Counsel (now King's Counsel) in January 2019.

Verdirame conducted empirical research on international organisations and refugee protection, which formed the basis of a series of articles and the book "Rights in Exile: Janus-faced Humanitarianism", which he co-authored with Barbara Harrell-Bond, an anthropologist whose "Imposing Aid" (1986) was a pioneering critique of international institutions and humanitarianism. Verdirame's "The UN and Human Rights: Who Guards the Guardians?" (2011) examined the accountability and responsibility of the UN. The book won the Biennial Book Award of the Friends of the Academic Council of the United Nations in 2014.

In addition to the law of international organisation, Verdirame has written on the use of force, the laws of war, trade and investment, international criminal law, and the philosophy of international law and human rights. He has argued that liberal internationalists have changed in the last decades, having embraced a supranationalist and cosmopolitan view of the international political order that gives little or no importance to the ideal of self-government and "is at odds with liberal internationalism properly understood". He is the author, with Oxford philosopher John Tasioulas, of the entry on international law in the Stanford Encyclopedia of Philosophy.

Verdirame was counsel for the UK Government in Miller v. Secretary of State for Exiting the European Union (2017) 'the Article 50 case' at the Supreme Court, and at the International Court of Justice [Obligations concerning Negotiations relating to Cessation of the Nuclear Arms Race and to Nuclear Disarmament (Marshall Islands v. United Kingdom)], and for the Italian Republic in the Enrica Lexie case about the detention of two Italian marines by India following an incident where two Indian fishermen were killed off the coast of Kerala. He was also instructed] by Leigh Day on behalf of The United Nations special rapporteur in the Court of Appeal and Supreme Court case Shamima Begum v. Secretary of State for the Home Department. It was reported in March 2022 that Verdirame represented Ukraine against Russia in the European Court of Human Rights in a case filed in response to the Russian invasion.

Verdirame wrote a number of papers during the Brexit debates in 2016–2019. He criticised the 2018 version of the Brexit withdrawal agreement negotiated under Theresa May arguing that the Northern Ireland "backstop would inevitably weaken the institutions of the Belfast Agreement and their role in policy-making for Northern Ireland" but that there were ways of strengthening the UK's position. He also co-authored a proposal with Sir Richard Aikens and Professor George Yarrow for Britain to remain in the European Economic Area while a long-term arrangement was negotiated. He has spoken against Britain leaving the European Convention on Human Rights.

=== House of Lords ===
It was announced as part of the 2022 Special Honours that Verdirame would receive a life peerage. On 2 November 2022, he was created Baron Verdirame, of Belsize Park in the London Borough of Camden. He sits in the Lords as a non-affiliated peer.

== Personal life ==
Verdirame's partner is the Conservative Party political adviser Henry Newman.

Orders of precedence in the United Kingdom
Preceded by The Lord Swire	Gentlemen; Baron Verdirame	Followed by The Lord Sahota
