= Lee Rowley =

British politician

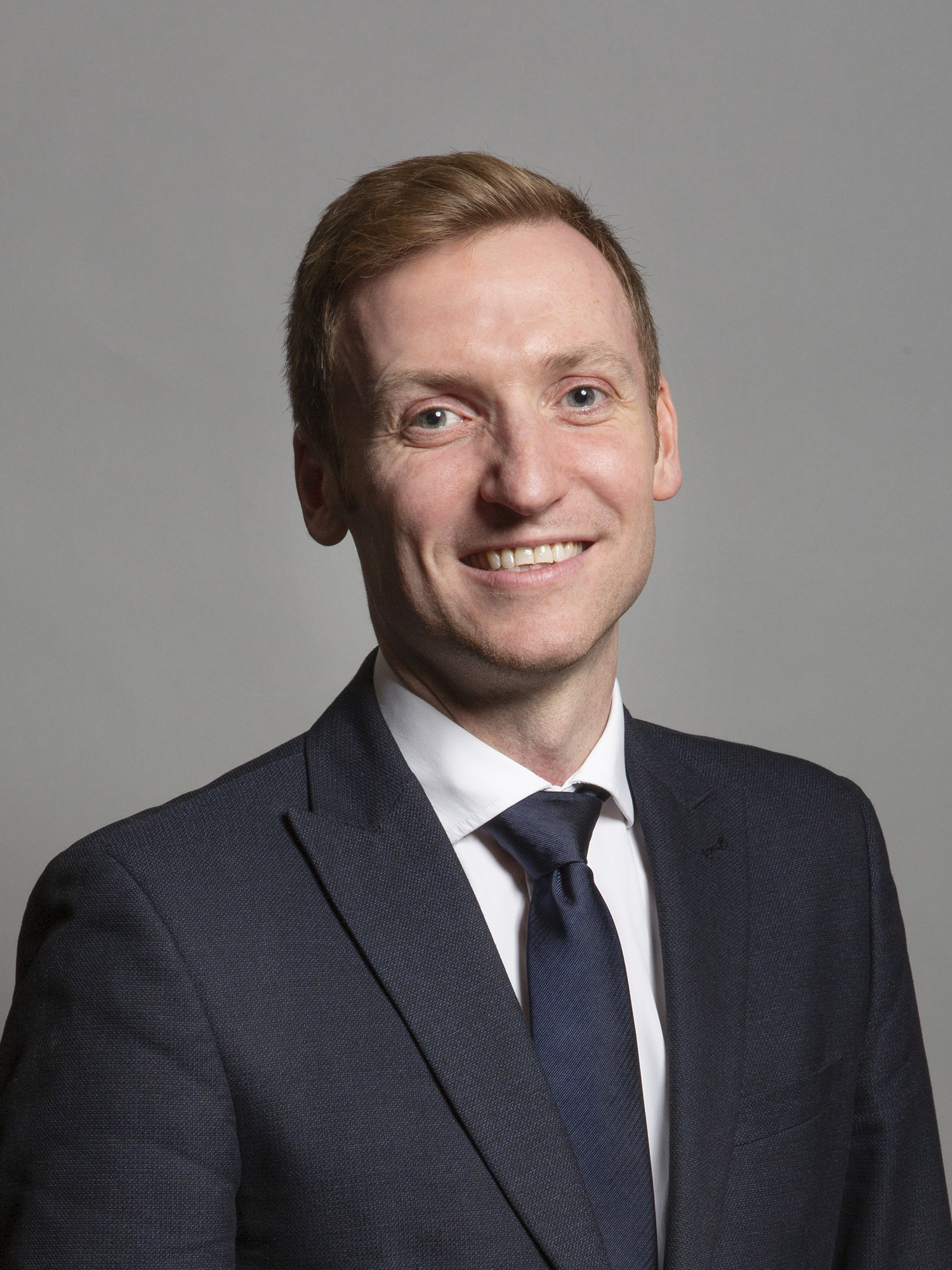
- Official portrait, 2019

Chief of Staff to the Leader of the Opposition
- In office 22 November 2024 – 22 July 2025
- Leader: Kemi Badenoch
- Preceded by: Liam Booth-Smith
- Succeeded by: Henry Newman

Minister of State for Housing, Planning and Building Safety (Note: Parliamentary Under-Secretary of State for Housing in 2022.)
- In office 13 November 2023 – 5 July 2024
- Prime Minister: Rishi Sunak
- Preceded by: Rachel Maclean (Note: As Minister of State for Housing and Planning.)
- Succeeded by: Matthew Pennycook (Housing and Planning); Rushanara Ali (Building Safety)
- In office 8 September 2022 – 27 October 2022
- Prime Minister: Liz Truss
- Preceded by: Marcus Jones
- Succeeded by: Lucy Frazer

Parliamentary Under-Secretary of State for Local Government and Building Safety
- In office 27 October 2022 – 13 November 2023
- Prime Minister: Rishi Sunak
- Preceded by: Paul Scully
- Succeeded by: Simon Hoare

Parliamentary Under-Secretary of State for Business and Industry
- In office 17 September 2021 – 6 July 2022
- Prime Minister: Boris Johnson
- Preceded by: Nadhim Zahawi
- Succeeded by: Jackie Doyle-Price (Note: As Minister of State for Industry. Office vacant between 6 July and 7 September 2022.)

Lord Commissioner of the Treasury
- In office 17 September 2021 – 6 July 2022
- Prime Minister: Boris Johnson
- Preceded by: David Rutley
- Succeeded by: Craig Whittaker

Deputy Chairman of the Conservative Party
- In office 5 May 2020 – 16 September 2021
- Leader: Boris Johnson
- Preceded by: Ranil Jayawardena
- Succeeded by: Justin Tomlinson

Member of Parliament for North East Derbyshire
- In office 8 June 2017 – 30 May 2024
- Preceded by: Natascha Engel
- Succeeded by: Louise Jones

Member of Westminster City Council for Maida Vale
- In office May 2006 – May 2014 Serving with Jan Prendergast; Alastair Moss
- Preceded by: Jan Prendergast; Ronnie Raymond-Cox; Alastair Moss
- Succeeded by: Jan Prendergast; Rita Begum; Thomas Crockett

Personal details
- Born: Lee Benjamin Rowley; 11 September 1980 (age 46) Chesterfield, Derbyshire, England
- Party: Conservative
- Education: Lincoln College, Oxford; University of Manchester
- Website: lee4ned.com

Lee Benjamin Rowley (born 11 September 1980) is a British management consultant and former politician who served as chief of staff to the Leader of the Opposition between November 2024 and July 2025. He previously served as Minister of State for Housing, Planning and Building Safety from November 2023 to July 2024. A member of the Conservative Party, he was the Member of Parliament (MP) for North East Derbyshire from 2017 to 2024. He previously served as Parliamentary Under-Secretary of State for Local Government and Building Safety between October 2022 and November 2023.

== Early life and career ==
Rowley was born in Scarsdale Hospital in Chesterfield. The son of a milkman, both his grandfathers were miners at pits in the area, including the Westhorpe and Shirebrook collieries – both of which closed under Conservative governments in the 1980s and 1990s. He grew up in Chesterfield and attended St Mary's High School, where he was head boy, graduating in 1999. Rowley became the first member of his family to attend university in 1999, when he won an exhibition to study Modern History at Lincoln College, Oxford, graduating with a second-class honours. He then read for a master's degree, also in history, at the University of Manchester.

Before becoming an MP, Rowley worked in financial services and management consultancy. He has held positions at Barclays, KPMG, Santander UK, and Co-op Insurance, where he was Head of Change at the time of his election to Parliament at the General Election 2017. Rowley had contributed to the centre-right think tank, the Centre for Social Justice.

== Westminster councillor ==
Aged 25, Rowley was elected as a Conservative councillor in May 2006 for the Maida Vale ward on Westminster City Council in London. He was re-elected in May 2010 and was appointed as Cabinet Member for Parking and Transportation. In this role he was responsible for an innovative trial of allowing motorcycles to use bus lanes in 2012, agreeing an out of court settlement with Mouchel over the awarding of a large parking contract in 2011, and victory in the High Court in 2010 over the principle of charging motorcyclists for parking in Westminster.

As the cabinet member for parking at the council, Rowley was tasked with implementing the council's policy to expand evening and weekend parking restrictions, which the council argued was to improve traffic congestion and pollution, but critics argued was partly for income generation. The policy was supported by some residents, as well as environmental and disability campaigners, but was criticised by some local residents, business owners and religious groups.

Dubbed a "nightlife tax" by Boris Johnson, the mayor of London, and following the High Court blocking the introduction of the parking charges, the plans were dropped when its architect, council leader Colin Barrow, resigned. Rowley also faced calls to resign from a range of sources, including the chef Michel Roux Jr and Glenys Roberts, a fellow Conservative councillor in Westminster.

As the cabinet member for parking, Rowley received media attention after the council was censured by the European Commission for infringing contract laws - and criticised for earlier claiming in a press release it had been "cleared of any wrong-doing". Rowley was alleged to have falsely claimed in a press release that: "We always maintained this contract was properly awarded following a tender process carried out in accordance with the law and we are obviously pleased that the EU has decided to close this case." However, the BBC subsequently obtained documents showing the Commission found against Westminster Council and that it was ordered to make changes. Rowley responded that the earlier statement was not intended to mislead and noted that no punitive action was taken against the council.

Rowley was transferred to a new role as Cabinet Member for Community Services in January 2012. He received positive national media coverage for a merger of library management across the London councils of Westminster, Hammersmith & Fulham and Kensington and Chelsea. The councils and Rowley said it resulted in significant financial savings, ensured all libraries stayed open across the three councils while retaining front-line staff, and gave residents access to one million books.

He stood down as a councillor and cabinet member in Westminster in May 2014 to focus on seeking election as an MP.

== Member of Parliament ==
Rowley stood unsuccessfully at the 2010 general election as the Conservative candidate for Bolsover, where he came second to Dennis Skinner. He stood again at the 2015 general election as the Conservative candidate for North East Derbyshire, again coming second, but reducing the sitting Labour MP Natascha Engel's majority to under 2,000 votes. He was subsequently elected as the MP for North East Derbyshire at the 2017 general election with a majority of 2,861. The result was notable as it made Rowley the first Conservative MP for the seat since 1935.

In his first parliamentary term, Rowley campaigned against planning applications in his own constituency for fracking operations. He has also argued against his party's efforts to reduce delays in approving schemes. Rowley argued that the specific Marsh Lane application was wrong in terms of content, location and timing, arguing the rural setting was not right for industrial activity. He stated that he would support concerned residents, oppose it and put his own objections against it to Derbyshire County Council.

Although opposing one specific application for a site in his constituency, he has said on fracking in general: "I am willing to look at fracking long term and to look at new ways of producing energy long term if they can be proven to be safe and efficient and effective for the country." The Independent reported that at a fringe event at the Conservative Party Conference in October 2018, Rowley argued his party's support for fracking could see them lose a future general election, due to the unpopularity of the process in local areas.

Along with fellow Conservative MP Luke Graham, Rowley helped set up and is Co-Chair of Freer, an initiative of the right leaning think tank the Institute of Economic Affairs. The group aims to promote a freer society and freer economy, through liberal economic and social policies.

When interviewed in June 2017 by the Financial Times, Rowley said that he had voted for Brexit at the 2016 referendum, but had not actively campaigned for it. The paper suggested that it appeared "he had deleted social media posts relating to the referendum period that might reveal how he had voted". He is not a member but has supported positions taken by the European Research Group – the primary Eurosceptic lobbying group within Parliament – and was one of a number of Conservative MPs to publicly oppose Theresa May's Chequers proposal.

In October 2019, Rowley proposed the loyal address following the Queen's Speech. He increased his majority from 2,861 to 12,876 at the 2019 general election.

In March 2020, Rowley and fellow MP Toby Perkins successfully lobbied for government funding for the Staveley bypass, a dual carriageway by-pass of Brimington, Staveley and Mastin Moor that has been planned since 1927.

Rowley has been the lead sponsor for a bid to reopen the alternative railway line between Sheffield and Chesterfield, which runs via Whittington, Staveley, Barrow Hill, Eckington, Renishaw and Killamarsh, on part of the route of the former North Midland Railway. In May 2020, the consortium successfully lobbied for the Government to commission a feasibility study of reopening the currently freight-only line to passenger trains.

In Parliament, Rowley served on the Public Accounts Committee. He was chair of the All-Party Parliamentary Group on Fracking, which he set up, and Vice-Chair of an all-party parliamentary group on ovarian cancer.

In May 2020, Rowley was promoted to Deputy Chairman of the Conservative Party, replacing Ranil Jayawardena.

On 17 September 2021, Rowley was appointed Parliamentary Under-Secretary of State at the Department for Business, Energy and Industrial Strategy and a lord commissioner of the Treasury (Government whip), during the second cabinet reshuffle of the second Johnson ministry.

On 6 July 2022, Rowley resigned from government, citing Boris Johnson's handling of the Chris Pincher scandal, in a joint statement with fellow Ministers Kemi Badenoch, Neil O'Brien, Alex Burghart and Julia Lopez. He then proposed Kemi Badenoch for Conservative Party leader in the July 2022 Conservative Party leadership election. He was appointed Parliamentary Under-Secretary of State for Housing by Liz Truss in September 2022. He was later appointed Parliamentary Under-Secretary of State for Local Government and Building Safety by Rishi Sunak in October of that year. On 13 November 2023 Rowley was appointed as Minister of State for Housing as part of the November 2023 British cabinet reshuffle. He replaced Rachel Maclean who had been sacked from the role earlier that day. He lost his seat in the 2024 General Election.

== Later career ==
Rowley was a major figure in Kemi Badenoch's 2024 Leadership Campaign, being credited with giving it a "business-like structure". After Badenoch's election as Leader of the Conservative Party in November 2024, Rowley was appointed her chief of staff. In July 2025, Rowley was replaced as Chief of Staff by his deputy, Henry Newman. This was despite Badenoch having previously described Rowley as her "closest friend in politics".

== Personal life ==
Rowley is openly gay.

== Notes ==
Parliament of the United Kingdom
Preceded by Natascha Engel	Member of Parliament for North East Derbyshire; 2017–2024	Succeeded by Louise Jones
Party political offices
Preceded by Ranil Jayawardena	Deputy Chairman of the Conservative Party; 2020–2021	Succeeded by Justin Tomlinson
Political offices
Preceded by David Rutley	Lord Commissioner of the Treasury; 2021–2022	Succeeded by Craig Whittaker
Preceded by Nadhim Zahawi	Parliamentary Under-Secretary of State for Business and Industry; 2021–2022	Succeeded by Jackie Doyle-Price
Preceded by Paul Scully	Parliamentary Under-Secretary of State for Local Government and Building Safety; 2022–2023	Succeeded by Simon Hoare
