= 2018 Camden London Borough Council election =

2018 local election in England

- 3 May 2018

All 54 seats to Camden London Borough Council 27 seats needed for a majority
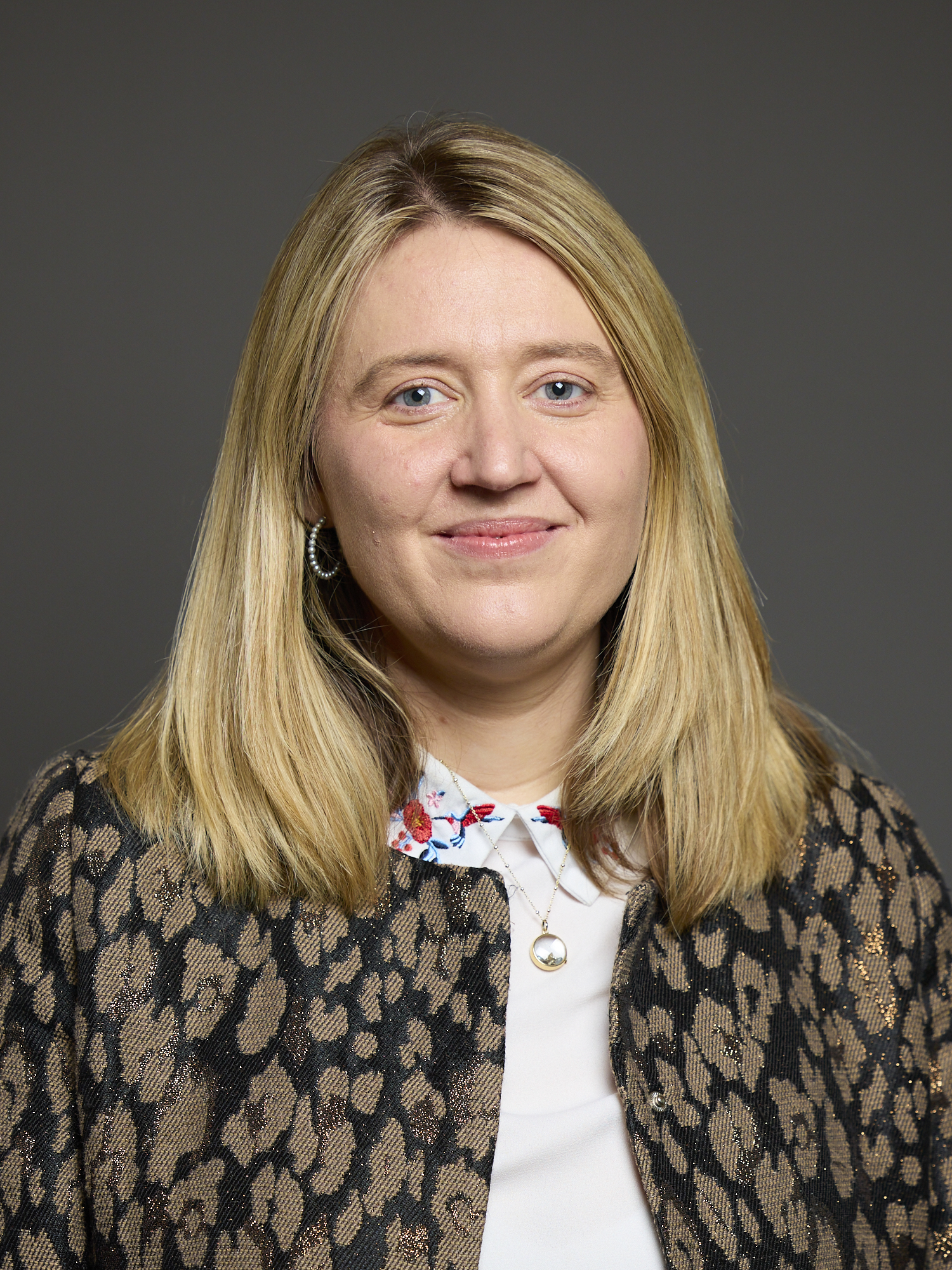

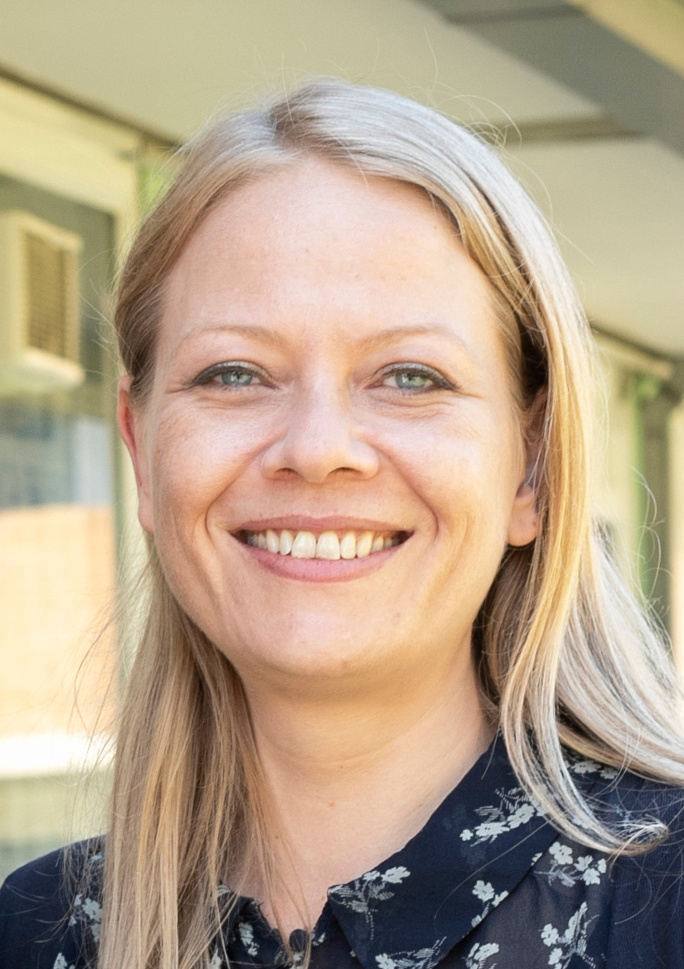
	First party	Second party
		Con
Leader	Georgia Gould	Gio Spinella
Party	Labour	Conservative
Leader since	2 May 2017	February 2018
Leader's seat	Kentish Town	Frognal and Fitzjohns
Last election	40 seats, 43.0%	12 seats, 21.3%
Seats before	42	11
Seats won	43	7
Seat change	▲3	▼5
Popular vote	28,599	12,332
Percentage	47.6%	20.5%
Swing	▲4.6%	▼0.8%
	Third party	Fourth party
	LD
Leader	Flick Rea	Siân Berry
Party	Liberal Democrats	Green
Leader since	May 2014	May 2014
Leader's seat	Fortune Green	Highgate
Last election	1 seat, 15.6%	1 seat, 16.0%
Seats before	2	1
Seats won	3	1
Seat change	▲2	Steady
Popular vote	10,481	7,595
Percentage	17.4%	12.6%
Swing	▲1.8%	▼3.4%
- Map of the results of the 2018 Camden council election. Conservatives in blue, Greens in green, Labour in red and Liberal Democrats in yellow.
Council control before election
Labour
Council control after election
Labour

The 2018 Camden election took place on 3 May 2018 to elect members of Camden Council in London. The Labour Party increased their majority on the council by gaining three seats from the Conservatives, who also lost two seats to the Liberal Democrats.

== Results ==
Camden Council election result 2018
Party	Seats	Gains	Losses	Net gain/loss	Seats %	Votes %	Votes	+/−
Labour	43	3	0	+3	79.6	47.6	28,599	+4.6
Conservative	7	0	5	−5	13.0	20.5	12,332	−0.8
Liberal Democrats	3	2	0	+2	5.6	17.4	10,481	+1.8
Green	1	0	0	0	1.9	12.6	7,595	−3.4
Independent	0	0	0	0		1.2	968	+0.6
UKIP	0	0	0	0		0.2	103	−2.6
Democrats and Veterans	0	0	0	0		0.1	62	New

== Ward results ==
=== Belsize ===
Belsize (3)
Party	Candidate	Votes	%	±%
Liberal Democrats	Tom Simon	1,250	34.1	+3.8
Conservative	Steve Adams	1,201	32.7	−4.6
Liberal Democrats	Luisa Porritt	1,179	32.1	+8.9
Conservative	Leila Roy *	1,170	31.9	+0.8
Conservative	Kirsty Roberts	1,162	31.7	−3.7
Liberal Democrats	Ben Newman	1,127	30.7	+10.0
Labour	James Calmus	1,067	29.1	+0.4
Labour	Sucharita Sethi	996	27.2	+3.3
Labour	Momota Khatoon	971	26.5	+4.8
Green	Sara Katchi	238	6.5	−1.9
Green	Phyl Eyres	223	6.1	−2.1
Independent	Nigel Rumble	123	3.4	−2.7
Turnout			42.48	
Liberal Democrats gain from Conservative		Swing		
Conservative hold		Swing		
Liberal Democrats gain from Conservative		Swing		

=== Bloomsbury ===
Bloomsbury (3)
Party	Candidate	Votes	%	±%
Labour	Adam Harrison *	1,045	56.9	+6.7
Labour	Sabrina Francis *	983	53.5	+4.2
Labour	Rishi Madlani *	931	50.7	+3.2
Conservative	Paul Tavares	365	19.9	−3.7
Conservative	Shahin Ahmed	334	18.2	−2.6
Conservative	Abdul Malique	330	18.0	−1.0
Liberal Democrats	Jane Headland	254	13.8	+5.6
Liberal Democrats	Aimery Roquefort	242	13.2	+6.0
Green	Jane-Eve Straughton	226	12.3	−3.9
Liberal Democrats	Martin Wright	191	10.4	+3.9
Green	Robert McCracken	188	10.2	−5.2
Green	Juan Jimenez	183	10.0	−3.2
Turnout			31.72	
Labour hold		Swing		
Labour hold		Swing		
Labour hold		Swing		

=== Camden Town with Primrose Hill ===
Camden Town with Primrose Hill (3)
Party	Candidate	Votes	%	±%
Labour	Pat Callaghan *	1,936	61.9	+3.5
Labour	Richard Cotton *	1,664	53.2	+8.3
Labour	Lazzaro Pietragnoli *	1,570	50.2	+3.4
Conservative	Catherine McQueen	632	20.2	+1.1
Conservative	Peter Horne	602	19.2	+1.5
Conservative	Joel Roberts	573	18.3	+1.8
Liberal Democrats	John Lefley	457	14.6	+5.6
Green	Rik Howard	434	13.8	−4.9
Liberal Democrats	Anne Wright	407	13.0	+4.4
Green	Mark Milaszkiewicz	384	12.3	−5.2
Liberal Democrats	Lawrence Nicholson	335	10.7	+3.3
Turnout			34.86	
Labour hold		Swing		
Labour hold		Swing		
Labour hold		Swing		

=== Cantelowes ===
Cantelowes (3)
Party	Candidate	Votes	%	±%
Labour	Angela Mason *	1,829	59.8	+6.5
Labour	Danny Beales *	1,780	58.2	+2.1
Labour	Ranjit Singh	1,503	49.1	−6.0
Liberal Democrats	Catherine Hays	804	26.3	+6.0
Liberal Democrats	Christopher Hattam	488	16.0	+6.0
Green	Fran Bury	449	14.7	−3.2
Liberal Democrats	Max Karasinski	442	14.5	+4.9
Green	Catherine Keshishian	435	14.2	−3.5
Green	Trevor O'Farrell	301	9.8	−5.5
Conservative	Ben Tansey	276	9.0	−1.5
Conservative	Robert Fox	270	8.8	−1.3
Conservative	Alexi Susiluoto	240	7.8	−1.9
Turnout			36.19	
Labour hold		Swing		
Labour hold		Swing		
Labour hold		Swing		

=== Fortune Green ===
Fortune Green (3)
Party	Candidate	Votes	%	±%
Liberal Democrats	Flick Rea *	1,496	41.1	+6.1
Labour Co-op	Lorna Russell *	1,468	40.3	+9.0
Labour Co-op	Richard Olszewski *	1,353	37.2	+7.8
Labour Co-op	Sorin Floti	1,326	36.4	+8.9
Liberal Democrats	Adrian Bridge	1,209	33.2	+4.3
Liberal Democrats	Tracey Shackle	1,138	31.3	+5.0
Conservative	Phil Taylor	758	20.8	−6.4
Conservative	Shamim Ahmed	663	18.2	−4.3
Conservative	Axel Kaae	659	18.1	−2.8
Green	Helen Jack	378	10.4	−1.9
Turnout			41.55	
Liberal Democrats hold		Swing		
Labour Co-op hold		Swing		
Labour Co-op hold		Swing		

=== Frognal and Fitzjohns ===
Frognal and Fitzjohns (3)
Party	Candidate	Votes	%	±%
Conservative	Henry Newman	1,631	51.8	−3.2
Conservative	Andrew Parkinson	1,621	51.4	−1.0
Conservative	Gio Spinella *	1,595	50.6	+0.9
Labour	Rebecca Shirazi	846	26.8	+4.5
Labour	Richard Chadwick	838	26.6	+7.8
Labour	Gail Wood	776	24.6	+6.9
Liberal Democrats	Anne Ward	438	13.9	+3.5
Liberal Democrats	Valdir Francisco	366	11.6	+0.8
Liberal Democrats	Shashank Krishna	358	11.4	+4.5
Green	Charles Harris	234	7.4	−7.7
Green	Anton Humphrey	163	5.2	−8.1
Independent	Marx de Morais (Note: On a local ticket of 'Independents for the Movement', but appearing on the ballot paper without a party description.)	135	4.3	N/A
Independent	Tara Patten	128	4.1	N/A
Independent	Stephen Cameron	122	3.9	N/A
Turnout			41.74	
Conservative hold		Swing		
Conservative hold		Swing		
Conservative hold		Swing		

=== Gospel Oak ===
Gospel Oak (3)
Party	Candidate	Votes	%	±%
Labour	Jenny Mulholland *	1,502	52.6	+0.9
Labour	Marcus Boyland *	1,442	50.5	+1.7
Labour	Larraine Revah *	1,361	47.6	+0.5
Liberal Democrats	Judy Dixey	759	26.6	+19.0
Liberal Democrats	Stephen Crosher	739	25.9	+18.4
Liberal Democrats	Matthew Kirk	603	21.1	+16.3
Green	Jane Walby	412	14.4	−2.4
Conservative	Will Blair	411	14.4	−5.0
Conservative	Cathleen Mainds	399	14.0	−2.9
Conservative	John Webber	350	12.3	−1.7
Green	Dominic Kendrick	292	10.2	−6.0
Turnout			36.63	
Labour hold		Swing		
Labour hold		Swing		
Labour hold		Swing		

=== Hampstead Town ===
Hampstead Town (3)
Party	Candidate	Votes	%	±%
Conservative	Stephen Stark *	1,522	43.1	−2.3
Conservative	Oliver Cooper *	1,455	41.2	−2.1
Conservative	Maria Higson	1,400	39.7	+2.1
Liberal Democrats	Linda Chung	1,247	35.3	+1.4
Labour	Sue Cullinan	898	25.5	+4.0
Liberal Democrats	Andrew Haslem-Jones	879	24.9	+7.9
Liberal Democrats	Will Coles	826	23.4	+7.4
Labour	Sunny Mandich	811	23.0	+2.0
Labour	James Slater	799	22.6	+4.6
Green	Richard Bourn	243	6.9	−8.2
Green	Michael Pawlyn	175	5.0	−5.8
Green	Ramsay Short	135	3.8	−4.7
Turnout			46.46	
Conservative hold		Swing		
Conservative hold		Swing		
Conservative hold		Swing		

=== Haverstock ===
Haverstock (3)
Party	Candidate	Votes	%	±%
Labour	Alison Kelly *	1,814	61.6	+14.8
Labour	Abdul Quadir *	1,653	56.1	+12.9
Labour	Abi Wood *	1,606	54.5	+14.4
Liberal Democrats	Jill Fraser	661	22.4	−7.2
Liberal Democrats	Jack Fleming	412	14.0	−12.7
Green	Pam Walker	401	13.6	+1.1
Liberal Democrats	Yannick Bultingaire	383	13.0	−12.0
Conservative	Daniel Ellis	354	12.0	+2.4
Conservative	Tom Ewins	321	10.9	+1.6
Green	Mike Sumner	317	10.8	+0.9
Conservative	Rahoul Bhansali	305	10.4	+2.4
Green	Mike Turner	241	8.2	−1.6
Turnout			33.56	
Labour hold		Swing		
Labour hold		Swing		
Labour hold		Swing		

=== Highgate ===
Highgate (3)
Party	Candidate	Votes	%	±%
Green	Siân Berry *	2,073	50.1	+9.4
Labour	Anna Wright	1,741	42.1	−1.0
Labour	Oliver Lewis *	1,727	41.8	+0.6
Labour	Maddy Raman	1,530	37.0	−1.8
Green	Kirsten De Keyser	1,387	31.1	+0.1
Green	John Holmes	1,197	29.0	+1.8
Conservative	Simone Finn	563	16.0	−2.9
Conservative	Ben Seifert	501	12.1	−5.9
Conservative	Jim Ormiston	493	11.9	−4.5
Liberal Democrats	Helena Djurkovic	284	6.9	+2.0
Liberal Democrats	Henry Potts	248	6.0	+0.3
Liberal Democrats	Stephen Pickthall	245	5.9	+2.7
Independent	Emily O'Mara	83	2.0	N/A
Independent	Constantine Buhayer	48	1.2	N/A
Turnout			50.42	
Green hold		Swing		
Labour hold		Swing		
Labour hold		Swing		

=== Holborn and Covent Garden ===
Holborn and Covent Garden (3)
Party	Candidate	Votes	%	±%
Labour	Julian Fulbrook *	1,716	61.8	+3.6
Labour	Sue Vincent *	1,705	61.4	+7.3
Labour	Awale Olad *	1,604	57.8	+7.7
Conservative	Alison Frost	544	19.6	−0.4
Conservative	Andrew Keep	497	17.9	−1.1
Conservative	Richard Merrin	446	16.1	−2.1
Green	Luke Dowding	419	15.1	±0.0
Liberal Democrats	Andrew Naughtie	312	11.2	+4.2
Green	John Mason	291	10.5	−3.9
Liberal Democrats	Charlotte O'Brien	257	9.3	+3.1
Liberal Democrats	Erich Wagner	216	7.8	+2.1
Turnout			32.47	
Labour hold		Swing		
Labour hold		Swing		
Labour hold		Swing		

=== Kentish Town ===
Kentish Town (3)
Party	Candidate	Votes	%	±%
Labour	Georgia Gould *	2,376	66.0	+12.8
Labour	Jenny Headlam-Wells *	2,310	64.2	+8.7
Labour	Meric Apak *	2,238	62.2	+11.2
Green	Kelly Pawlyn	572	15.9	−6.7
Green	Dee Searle	568	15.8	−5.2
Green	Charley Greenwood	556	15.5	−3.4
Liberal Democrats	Margo Miller	348	9.7	+0.1
Conservative	Mac Chapwell	345	9.6	−2.0
Conservative	Darryl Davies	339	9.4	−1.5
Liberal Democrats	Victor Hjort	324	9.0	+1.2
Liberal Democrats	Jill Newbrook	300	8.3	+3.3
Conservative	Shreena Patel	261	7.3	−2.9
Turnout			37.49	
Labour hold		Swing		
Labour hold		Swing		
Labour hold		Swing		

=== Kilburn ===
Kilburn (3)
Party	Candidate	Votes	%	±%
Labour	Douglas Beattie *	1,733	61.5	+11.2
Labour	Maryam Eslamdoust *	1,722	61.1	+12.3
Labour	Thomas Gardiner *	1,613	57.2	+10.5
Conservative	Harry Richardson	457	16.2	+3.7
Conservative	Georgina Stockley	433	15.4	+3.0
Conservative	Sanjoy Sen	416	14.8	+4.0
Liberal Democrats	James King	390	13.8	−12.9
Liberal Democrats	Janet Grauberg	385	13.7	−12.8
Liberal Democrats	Davi Kothari	268	9.5	−13.1
Green	Matthew Spencer	239	8.5	−3.7
Green	Carmen Alcantara	230	8.2	−0.5
Green	Sarah Nicoll	225	8.0	−0.4
Turnout			32.43	
Labour hold		Swing		
Labour hold		Swing		
Labour hold		Swing		

=== King's Cross ===
King's Cross (3)
Party	Candidate	Votes	%	±%
Labour	Jonathan Simpson *	1,191	60.6	+10.0
Labour	Georgie Robertson	1,180	60.1	+4.4
Labour	Abdul Hai *	1,130	57.5	+3.5
Green	Emma Barker	377	19.2	−1.7
Conservative	Robyn Gardner	281	14.3	−1.0
Conservative	Adam Lester	242	12.3	−4.1
Liberal Democrats	Elizabeth Jones	239	12.2	+2.2
Conservative	Samuel Dyas	205	10.4	−4.8
Green	Nicola Hart	198	10.1	−7.3
Liberal Democrats	Mark Johnson	174	8.9	−0.1
Liberal Democrats	Ekaterina Kirk	171	8.7	+1.3
Green	Les Levidow	157	8.0	−8.9
Democrats and Veterans	Robert Connor	62	3.2	N/A
Turnout			29.72	
Labour hold		Swing		
Labour hold		Swing		
Labour hold		Swing		

=== Regent's Park ===
Regent's Park (3)
Party	Candidate	Votes	%	±%
Labour	Nadia Shah *	1,803	65.5	+16.0
Labour	Heather Johnson *	1,797	65.3	+13.4
Labour	Nasim Ali *	1,783	64.8	+13.7
Conservative	Alexander Ellis	467	17.0	−1.4
Conservative	Chantelle De Villers	451	16.4	−0.7
Conservative	Carole Ricketts	428	15.6	−0.4
Independent	Steven Christofi	364	13.2	N/A
Liberal Democrats	Margaret Jackson-Roberts	244	8.9	+1.7
Liberal Democrats	John Gordon	234	8.5	+2.4
Liberal Democrats	Surya Kumaravel	229	8.3	+4.2
Turnout			31.68	
Labour hold		Swing		
Labour hold		Swing		
Labour hold		Swing		

=== St Pancras and Somers Town ===
St Pancras and Somers Town (3)
Party	Candidate	Votes	%	±%
Labour	Samata Khatoon *	2,611	74.6	+10.4
Labour	Roger Robinson *	2,520	72.0	+5.4
Labour	Paul Tomlinson *	2,460	70.3	+4.4
Green	Tina Swasey	341	9.7	−5.2
Conservative	David Allen	295	8.4	−1.4
Conservative	Doreen Bartlett	295	8.4	−0.9
Green	Mark Scantlebury	264	7.5	−6.4
Liberal Democrats	Kimberley Stansfield	251	7.2	+0.7
Conservative	Robert Lingard	243	6.9	−0.9
Liberal Democrats	Sarah Hoyle	230	6.6	+1.5
Liberal Democrats	James Barker	192	5.5	+0.8
UKIP	Oliver Butt	103	2.9	N/A
UKIP	Christopher Cooke	84	2.4	N/A
UKIP	Giles Game	82	2.3	N/A
Turnout			35.11	
Labour hold		Swing		
Labour hold		Swing		
Labour hold		Swing		

=== Swiss Cottage ===
Swiss Cottage (3)
Party	Candidate	Votes	%	±%
Labour	Nayra O'Shanahan	1,605	45.5	+12.5
Labour	Leo Cassarani	1,541	43.7	+12.9
Labour	Simon Pearson	1,417	40.1	+7.7
Conservative	Kate Fairhurst	1,324	37.5	−5.5
Conservative	Calvin Robinson	1,277	36.2	−5.3
Conservative	Don Williams *	1,277	36.2	−3.0
Liberal Democrats	Scott Benson	456	12.9	+1.8
Liberal Democrats	Kushal Bhimjiani	448	12.7	+3.1
Liberal Democrats	Nick Russell	388	11.0	+3.6
Green	Sheila Hayman	262	7.4	−6.5
Green	Brian Gascoigne	250	7.1	−4.7
Independent	Lina Hammouda	36	1.0	N/A
Independent	Peter Straker	33	0.9	N/A
Independent	Calvin Po	24	0.7	N/A
Turnout			38.47	
Labour gain from Conservative		Swing		
Labour gain from Conservative		Swing		
Labour gain from Conservative		Swing		

=== West Hampstead ===
West Hampstead (3)
Party	Candidate	Votes	%	±%
Labour	Nazma Rahman	1,390	41.4	+6.2
Labour	Shiva Tiwari	1,267	37.7	+2.9
Labour	Peter Taheri	1,260	37.5	+5.2
Conservative	David Brescia	940	28.0	+3.8
Liberal Democrats	Roger Fox	878	26.1	−2.0
Conservative	Sedef Akademir	819	24.4	+0.5
Liberal Democrats	Nancy Jirira	777	23.1	−3.8
Conservative	Mohammed Salim	739	22.0	+0.7
Liberal Democrats	Mukul Hira	723	21.5	−3.4
Green	Jane Milton	335	10.0	−0.2
Green	Helena Paul	290	8.6	−1.1
Green	David Stansell	229	6.8	−0.7
Turnout			37.97	
Labour hold		Swing		
Labour hold		Swing		
Labour hold		Swing		
