= Pamela Chesters =

Pamela Joy Chesters CBE (born 1956) is a former executive of British Petroleum who was later a Camden London Borough Council councillor, a Conservative parliamentary candidate, and an advisor to Boris Johnson.

She now serves as Chair of Council at the University of Bath. She is also a non-executive director on the Ministerial Board of the Ministry of Housing, Communities and Local Government and Chair of the Independent Schools Inspectorate.

== Early life ==
Chesters grew up in Edinburgh and took a degree in Mediaeval History at the University of St Andrews.

== Career ==
On her graduation from St Andrews, Chesters joined the British Petroleum group of companies, in which for nearly twenty years she held posts in Britain and the United States. Her last position with BP was as CEO of its subsidiary Duckhams Oils.

From 1990 to 2000, she was an elected member of Camden London Borough Council, in which she led the Conservative group from 1998. She served on the Local Government Association's Education Executive from 1997 to 2000 and was also a school governor.

She chaired the Royal Free Hampstead NHS Trust from 2001 to 2009 and the English Churches Housing Group from 2003 to 2009, also serving as a board member of the Riverside Group from 2006 to 2009. She was also a member of Camden's Racial Equality Council.

She chaired the Council of Trustees of Action for Children from 2006 to 2012.

At the UK general election of 2001, she was the Conservative candidate in Bristol West, gaining 16,040 votes, and in 2006 was added to David Cameron's A-List of Conservative candidates.

From May 2009 to May 2012, Chesters served as Advisor for Health and Youth Opportunities to the Mayor of London, Boris Johnson. During this time she was a member of the London Health Commission, the London Poverty Commission, and the London Skills and Employment Board.

She was Chair of Central London Community Healthcare NHS Trust 2012 - 2016 and Chair of Anchor Trust from 2013- 2018. More recently she was a member of Court at St Andrews University and chaired their Audit and Risk Committee.

She is Chair of Council at the University of Bath and a non-executive director on the Ministerial Board of the Ministry of Housing, Communities and Local Government.

== Honours ==
Chesters was appointed Commander of the Order of the British Empire (CBE) in the Birthday Honours, 2013, for services to vulnerable children.
