= Sophie Dix =

English actress

- Born: 3 March 1969 (age 57); Totnes, Devon, England
- Occupations: Actress, writer
- Years active: 1991–2020
- Children: 2

Sophie Dix (born 3 March 1969) is an English actress, best known for her role as Captain Sadie Williams in Soldier Soldier. She has also had roles in The Bill, Benidorm, Between The Lines, and Holby City. In March 2022, she appeared in an episode of the BBC soap opera Doctors as Viv Beaden.

== Personal life ==
Dix has lived in the London borough of Hampstead for twenty years. Her long-term partner is Nevil Coleman and she has two daughters, Georgia and Violet. In 2012, she stood as a candidate for the Green Party at the Hampstead Town council by-election, receiving 207 votes. She stood again in 2015 and received 597 votes, coming third with 11.3% of the vote.

In October 2017, Dix joined the growing number of women who have alleged that producer Harvey Weinstein sexually harassed, sexually intimidated, and/or sexually assaulted them. She told The Guardian that, in the early 1990s, in a hotel room to which he had invited her to watch rushes with him during filming of The Hour of the Pig, he tried to force himself on her and masturbated in front of her; the incident left her emotionally scarred and despondent: "It's the single most damaging thing that's happened in my life" Dix said, and she believes that it ruined her film career.
