= Siobhan Baillie =

British Conservative politician (born 1981)

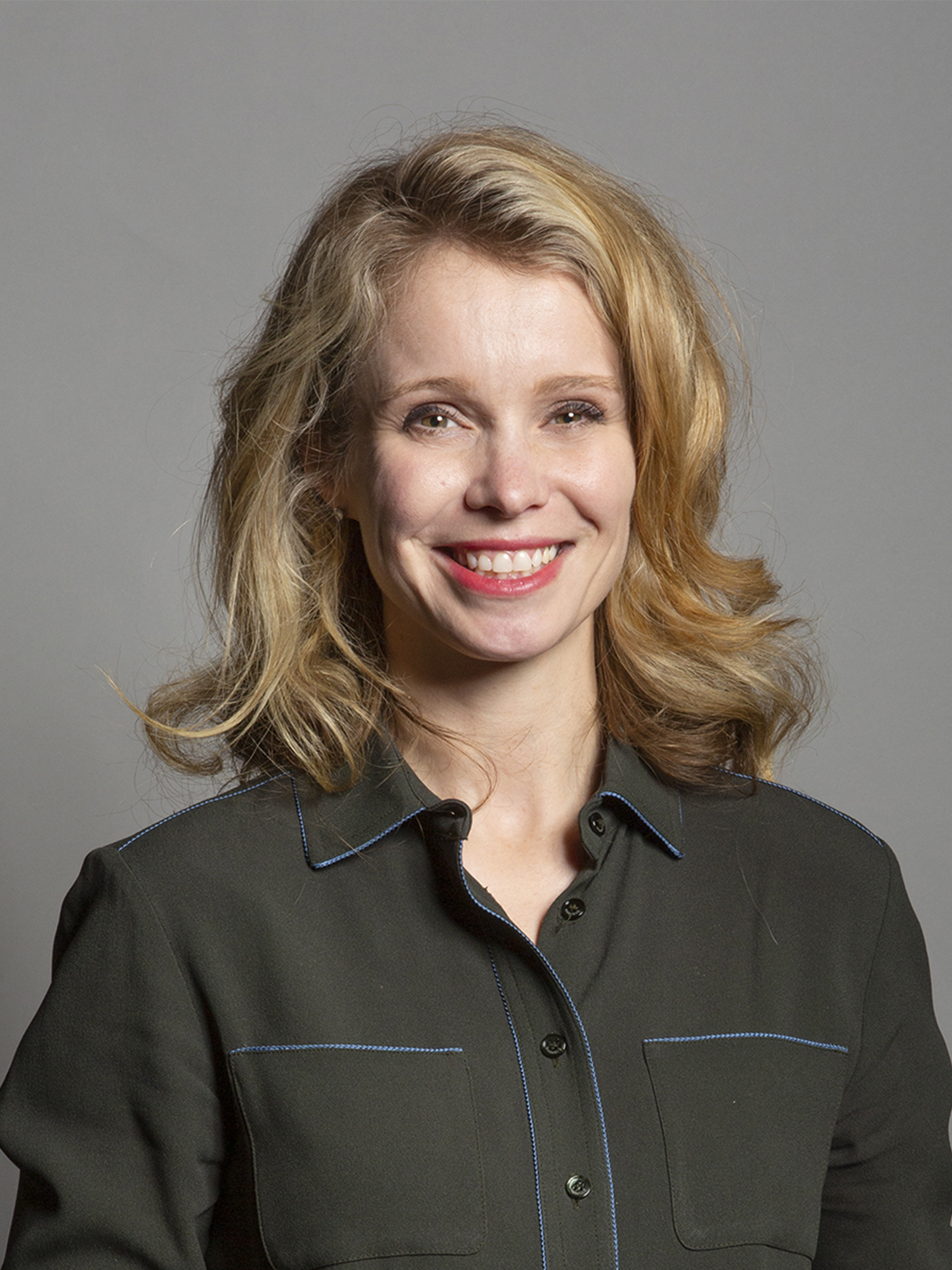
- Official portrait, 2019

Member of Parliament for Stroud
- In office 12 December 2019 – 30 May 2024
- Preceded by: David Drew
- Succeeded by: Simon Opher

Personal details
- Born: 28 August 1981 (age 45) Crawley, West Sussex, England
- Party: Conservative
- Children: 2
- Website: www.siobhanbaillie.org.uk

Siobhan Kathleen Baillie (born 28 August 1981) is a British former politician. A member of the Conservative Party, she was the Member of Parliament (MP) for Stroud from the 2019 general election until 2024. Before her parliamentary career, she was a family law solicitor, a councillor, and worked for a charity.

== Early life ==
Baillie was born in Crawley, West Sussex, on 28 August 1981, and she moved with her family at the age of eight to Filey, North Yorkshire. She has a younger brother and sister. Her parents separated during her childhood. Baillie moved out of the family home at the age of 15 and left school two years later to work as a legal secretary in Reading, Berkshire. She attended a law school at weekends, and qualified as a family law solicitor in 2010. Baillie also worked as the head of policy and communications for the charity, OnePlusOne.

== Political career ==
Baillie was a councillor in the London Borough of Camden from 2014 to 2018, representing the ward of Frognal and Fitzjohns. As an opposition member she served on the Children, Schools and Families Scrutiny Committee and during the 2016–2017 civic year she chaired a review of mental health service provision for young people.

She stood for the Bermondsey and Old Southwark seat at the 2017 general election. She was third behind the Labour and Liberal Democrat candidates with 13% of the vote. She had previously unsuccessfully sought selection for the Hampstead and Kilburn constituency for the same election, and for the Barnet and Camden London Assembly seat at the 2016 election.

Baillie was selected as the Conservative candidate for Stroud on 31 July 2018. She supported the UK remaining within the EU in the 2016 UK EU membership referendum, but during her 2019 election campaign indicated that she now supported Brexit, to honour the result of the referendum. At the 2019 general election, she was elected as an MP with a majority of 3,840 (5.8%). The seat had been represented by Labour and Co-operative MP David Drew since the 1997 election. Baillie was the first woman to represent the constituency. She was appointed to the Work and Pensions Select Committee in March 2020.

In July 2021, Baillie commented that she opposed the removal of the Blackboy Clock in Stroud as she felt that it was important to leave all statues to "reflect our country's journey in the 20th and 21st centuries toward equality" but supported adding "factual information" on the "origins of its imagery".

Baillie endorsed Rishi Sunak in the July–September 2022 Conservative Party leadership election and the subsequent October 2022 Conservative Party leadership election.

She apologised in August 2023 for wrongfully claiming that she had created the Natural History GCSE on her website and in a campaign leaflet.

Baillie lost her seat in the 2024 general election to Labour's Simon Opher.

== Personal life ==
Baillie married Kristian Triggle on 23 June 2018 at St Mary's Church in Swinbrook. Triggle is a managing director for the Swiss banking firm UBS. The couple have two daughters born in 2020 and 2022.

Parliament of the United Kingdom
Preceded by David Drew	Member of Parliament for Stroud; 2019–2024	Succeeded by Simon Opher
