= Frognal and Fitzjohns (ward) =

Former electoral ward in the London borough of Camden

Coordinates: 51.555°N 0.184°W

- Former electoral ward for the Camden London Borough Council
- Frognal and Fitzjohns ward boundaries
- Borough: Camden
- County: Greater London
- Population: 11,986 (2011)
- Electorate: 7,564 (2018)

Former electoral ward
- Created: 2002
- Abolished: 2022
- Councillors: 3
- Replaced by: Belsize, Frognal
- ONS code: 00AGGJ
- GSS code: E05000133

Frognal and Fitzjohns was an electoral ward in the London Borough of Camden, in the United Kingdom. The ward was created for the 2002 elections and last used for the 2018 elections. It returned three councillors to Camden London Borough Council.

It covered the western areas of Hampstead, between Hampstead Village and Finchley Road and took its name from Frognal and Fitzjohns Avenue. The population of this ward at the 2011 Census was 11,986. The ward was abolished from the 2022 election, and part of its area became the newly created Frognal ward, with a smaller area transferred to Belsize.

Notable former councillors include Siobhan Bailllie, MP for Stroud, Laura Trott, MP for Sevenoaks, and Gio Spinella, leader of the Conservative Group on Camden Council.

== List of councillors ==
Term	Councillor	Party
2002–2010	Martin Davies	Conservative
2002–2010	Dawn Somper	Conservative
2002–2018	Andrew Mennear	Conservative
2010–2014	Laura Trott	Conservative
2010–2022	Gio Spinella	Conservative
2014–2022	Siobhan Baillie	Conservative
2018–2022	Henry Newman	Conservative

== Camden council elections ==
=== 2018 election ===
The election took place on 3 May 2018.

2018 Camden London Borough Council election: Frognal and Fitzjohns
Party	Candidate	Votes	%	±%
Conservative	Henry Newman	1,631	51.8	−3.2
Conservative	Andrew Parkinson	1,621	51.4	−1.0
Conservative	Gio Spinella	1,595	50.6	+0.9
Labour	Rebecca Shirazi	846	26.8	+4.5
Labour	Richard Chadwick	838	26.6	+7.8
Labour	Gail McAnena Wood	776	24.6	+6.9
Liberal Democrats	Anne Ward	438	13.9	+3.5
Liberal Democrats	Valdir Francisco	366	11.6	+0.8
Liberal Democrats	Shashank Krishna	358	11.4	+4.5
Green	Charles Hilary Harris	234	7.4	−7.7
Green	Anton Humphrey	163	5.2	−8.1
Independent	Marx de Morais	135	4.3	N/A
Independent	Tara Patten	128	4.1	N/A
Independent	Stephen Cameron	122	3.9	N/A
Turnout			41.74	
Conservative hold		Swing		
Conservative hold		Swing		
Conservative hold		Swing		

=== 2014 election ===
The election took place on 22 May 2014.

2014 Camden London Borough Council election: Frognal and Fitzjohns
Party	Candidate	Votes	%	±%
Conservative	Siobhan Baillie	1,497	19.4%	
Conservative	Andrew Mennear	1,428	18.5%	
Conservative	Gio Spinella	1,352	17.5%	
Labour	Jack Boardman	606	7.8%	
Labour	Richard Salmon	512	6.6%	
Labour	Mazida Khatun	481	6.2%	
Green	Charles Harris	411	5.3%	
Green	Edward Ross	363	4.7%	
Green	Stephen Edward West	312	4.0%	
Liberal Democrats	David Bouchier	294	3.8%	
Liberal Democrats	Anne Ward	284	3.7%	
Liberal Democrats	Erich Wagner	187	2.4%	
Majority		746	9.7%	
Turnout		7,727	33.7%	
Conservative hold		Swing		

=== 2010 by-election ===
They by-election took place on 22 July 2010, following the death of Martin Davies.

2010 Frognal and Fitzjohns by-election
Party	Candidate	Votes	%	±%
Conservative	Gio Spinella	1,061	62.6%	+10.5%
Liberal Democrats	David Bouchier	329	19.4%	−3.4%
Labour	Jack Smith	235	13.9%	−4.2%
Green	Charles Harris	71	4.2%	−2.9%
Majority		732	43.2%	
Turnout				
Conservative hold		Swing		

=== 2010 election ===
The election on 6 May 2010 took place on the same day as the United Kingdom general election.

2010 Camden London Borough Council election: Frognal and Fitzjohns
Party	Candidate	Votes	%	±%
Conservative	Martin Davies	2,624		
Conservative	Laura Trott	2,490		
Conservative	Andrew Mennear	2,382		
Liberal Democrats	Jeffrey Fine	1,151		
Liberal Democrats	Richard Bauer	1,046		
Labour	Phil Hingley	910		
Labour	Paul Blanchard	870		
Liberal Democrats	Andrew Haslam-Jones	864		
Labour	Shahnewaz Ahmed	724		
Green	Charles Harris	346		
Green	Alice Taylor	346		
Green	Edward Ross	342		
Majority		178		
Turnout				
Conservative hold		Swing		

=== 2006 election ===
The election took place on 4 May 2006.

2006 Camden London Borough Council election: Frognal and Fitzjohns
Party	Candidate	Votes	%	±%
Conservative	Martin Davies	1,603	61.0	+4.2
Conservative	Dawn Somper	1,513	57.6	+1.9
Conservative	Andrew Mennear	1,500	57.1	+1.7
Liberal Democrats	Diane Litman	453	17.3	−0.7
Liberal Democrats	Alan Templeton	394	15.0	−1.6
Labour	Thomas Gardiner	364	13.9	−5.2
Labour	Peter Sanderson	353	13.4	−3.7
Liberal Democrats	Erich Wagner	342	13.0	−1.2
Green	Charles Harris	331	12.6	+5.5
Labour	Luca Salice	316	12.0	−4.7
Green	Edward Ross	296	11.3	+3.6
Green	Tatton Spiller	267	10.2	+2.6
Turnout		7,732	32.2	
Conservative hold		Swing		
Conservative hold		Swing		
Conservative hold		Swing		

=== 2002 election ===
The election took place on 2 May 2002.

2002 Camden London Borough Council election: Frognal and Fitzjohns
Party	Candidate	Votes	%	±%
Conservative	Martin Davies	1,141	56.8	
Conservative	Dawn Somper	1,119	55.7	
Conservative	Andrew Mennear	1,114	55.4	
Labour	Deborah Townsend	384	19.1	
Liberal Democrats	Susan Garden	362	18.0	
Labour	Alfred Lawrie	344	17.1	
Labour	Francis McGrath	336	16.7	
Liberal Democrats	Dominic Curran	333	16.6	
Liberal Democrats	Charles Keidan	286	14.2	
Green	Lynn Lovell	155	7.7	
Green	Stuart Houghton	153	7.6	
Green	Charles Harris	143	7.1	
Turnout		5,870		
Conservative win (new seat)				
Conservative win (new seat)				
Conservative win (new seat)				
