= Frognal (ward) =

Ward in the London Borough of Camden

- ward for Camden Council
- Boundary of Frognal in Camden.
- County: Greater London
- Electorate: 5,300

Current ward
- Created: 2022
- Councillor: None
- Number of councillors: Two
- Created from: Frognal and Fitzjohns

1978–2002
- Number of councillors: Two
- Replaced by: Frognal and Fitzjohns
- UK Parliament constituency: Hampstead and Highgate

Frognal is an electoral ward in the London Borough of Camden. The ward was originally created in 1978 and abolished in 2002. It was created again in 2022. It returns two councillors to Camden London Borough Council.

== List of councillors ==
=== First creation ===
Term	Councillor	Party
1978–1990	Alan Greengross	Conservative
1978–1982	Julian Harrison	Conservative
1982–1990	Gwyneth Williams	Conservative
1990–2000	Pamela Chesters	Conservative
1990–1994	Giles Marshall	Conservative
1994–2002	Dawn Somper	Conservative
2001–2002	Mike Green	Conservative

=== Second creation ===
Term	Councillor	Party
2022–2026	Andrew Parkinson	Conservative
2022–2024	Gio Spinella	Conservative
2024–present	Steven Adams	Conservative
2026–present	Juliette Graham	Conservative

== Camden council elections since 2022 ==
Frognal ward boundaries since 2022

=== 2026 election ===
The election took place on 7 May 2026.

2026 Camden London Borough Council election: Frognal
Party	Candidate	Votes	%	±%
Conservative	Steven Adams	1,034		
Conservative	Juliette Graham	933		
Green	Charles Harris	361		
Labour	Jack Leader	355		
Labour	Willow Parker	342		
Green	Catherine Keshishian	339		
Reform	Marx De Morais	253		
Liberal Democrats	Reetendra Banerji	243		
Liberal Democrats	Valdir Francisco	236		
Reform	Thomas Sterling	233		
Turnout			39.06	+5.16
Conservative hold		Swing		
Conservative hold		Swing		

=== 2024 by-election ===
The by-election was held on 2 May 2024, following the resignation of Gio Spinella. It took place on the same day as the 2024 London mayoral election, the 2024 London Assembly election and 14 other borough council by-elections across London.

2024 Frognal by-election
Party	Candidate	Votes	%	±%
Conservative	Steve Adams	1,103	49.8%	+2.4%
Labour	Simon Lickert	519	23.5%	−0.9%
Liberal Democrats	Sarah Hoyle	372	16.8%	+2.7%
Green	Charles Harris	219	9.9%	−4.3%
Turnout		2,213		
Conservative hold		Swing		

=== 2022 election ===
The election took place on 5 May 2022.

2022 Camden London Borough Council election: Frognal
Party	Candidate	Votes	%	±%
Conservative	Andrew Parkinson	923	52.1%	
Conservative	Gio Spinella	890	50.3%	
Labour	Suber Abdikarim	473	26.7%	
Labour	John Carr	469	26.5%	
Green	Charles Harris	276	15.6%	
Liberal Democrats	Adrian Bridge	274	15.5%	
Liberal Democrats	Valdir Francisco	236	13.3%	
Turnout		3,571	33.9%	
Conservative win (new seat)				
Conservative win (new seat)				

== 1978–2002 Camden council elections ==
Frognal ward boundaries from 1978 to 2002

=== 2001 by-election ===
The by-election took place on 25 January 2001.

2001 Frognal by-election
Party	Candidate	Votes	%	±%
Conservative	Mike Greene	537	61.6	
Labour	Marie E. Bardsley	198	22.7	
Liberal Democrats	Martin P. Wright	98	11.2	
Green	Ceinwen M. Jones	23	2.6	
Independent	Antoine J. Clarke	16	1.8	
Majority		339	38.9	
Turnout		872	18.7	
Conservative hold		Swing		

=== 1998 election ===
The election took place on 7 May 1998.

1998 Camden London Borough Council election: Frognal
Party	Candidate	Votes	%	±%
Conservative	Pamela Chesters	687		
Conservative	Dawn Somper	640		
Labour	Anne Robertson	311		
Labour	Helen Seaford	279		
Liberal Democrats	Barbara How	272		
Liberal Democrats	Nigel Barnes	253		
Green	Charles Harris	136		
Majority		329		
Turnout			30.7	
Conservative hold		Swing		
Conservative hold		Swing		

=== 1994 election ===
The election took place on 5 May 1994.

1994 Camden London Borough Council election: Frognal
Party	Candidate	Votes	%	±%
Conservative	Pamela Chesters	800	50.2	
Conservative	Dawn Somper	658	41.3	
Labour	Dianne Hayter	420	26.3	
Labour	Regan Scott	378	23.7	
Liberal Democrats	Barbara How	311	19.5	
Liberal Democrats	Nigel Barnes	300	18.8	
Hampstead Charter	Helen Marcus	270	16.9	
Green	Sebastian Secker Walker	143	9.0	
Majority		238	14.9	
Turnout		1,595	40.7	
Registered electors		3,918		
Conservative hold		Swing		
Conservative hold		Swing		

=== 1990 election ===
The election took place on 3 May 1990.

1990 Camden London Borough Council election: Frognal
Party	Candidate	Votes	%	±%
Conservative	Pamela Beveridge	1,109	58.7	
Conservative	Giles Marshall	1,058	56.0	
Labour	Dianne Hayter	343	18.1	
Labour	Regan Scott	302	16.0	
Liberal Democrats	Barbara How	226	12.0	
Green	Sebastian Secker Walker	224	11.9	
Liberal Democrats	Nigel Barnes	209	11.1	
Majority		715	37.8	
Turnout		1,890	44.6	
Registered electors		4,242		
Conservative hold		Swing		
Conservative hold		Swing		

=== 1986 election ===
The election took place on 8 May 1986.

1986 Camden London Borough Council election: Frognal
Party	Candidate	Votes	%	±%
Conservative	Alan Greengross	930		
Conservative	Gwyneth Williams	905		
Labour	Amber Dobson	479		
Labour	David Richter	446		
Alliance	Nicola-Jane Taylor	401		
Alliance	Hilary Billins	383		
Majority		426		
Turnout			44.5	
Registered electors		4,214		
Conservative hold		Swing		
Conservative hold		Swing		

=== 1982 election ===
The election took place on 6 May 1982.

1982 Camden London Borough Council election: Frognal
Party	Candidate	Votes	%	±%
Conservative	Alan Greengross	1,170		
Conservative	Gwyneth Williams	1,124		
Alliance	William Laing	603		
Alliance	Richard Waddington	594		
Labour	Stella Greenall	346		
Labour	Marie Kosloff	330		
Majority		521		
Turnout			45.5	
Registered electors		4,167		
Conservative hold		Swing		
Conservative hold		Swing		

=== 1978 election ===
The election took place on 4 May 1978.

1978 Camden London Borough Council election: Frognal
Party	Candidate	Votes	%	±%
Conservative	Alan Greengross	1,363		
Conservative	Julian Harrison	1,319		
Labour	Alan Yates	481		
Labour	Richard Wigley	453		
Liberal	Brian Sugden	258		
Majority		838		
Turnout			43.6	
Registered electors		4,912		
Conservative win (new seat)				
Conservative win (new seat)				
