= London Borough of Camden =

Borough in Inner London, England

Coordinates: 51°32′N 0°10′W

- London borough
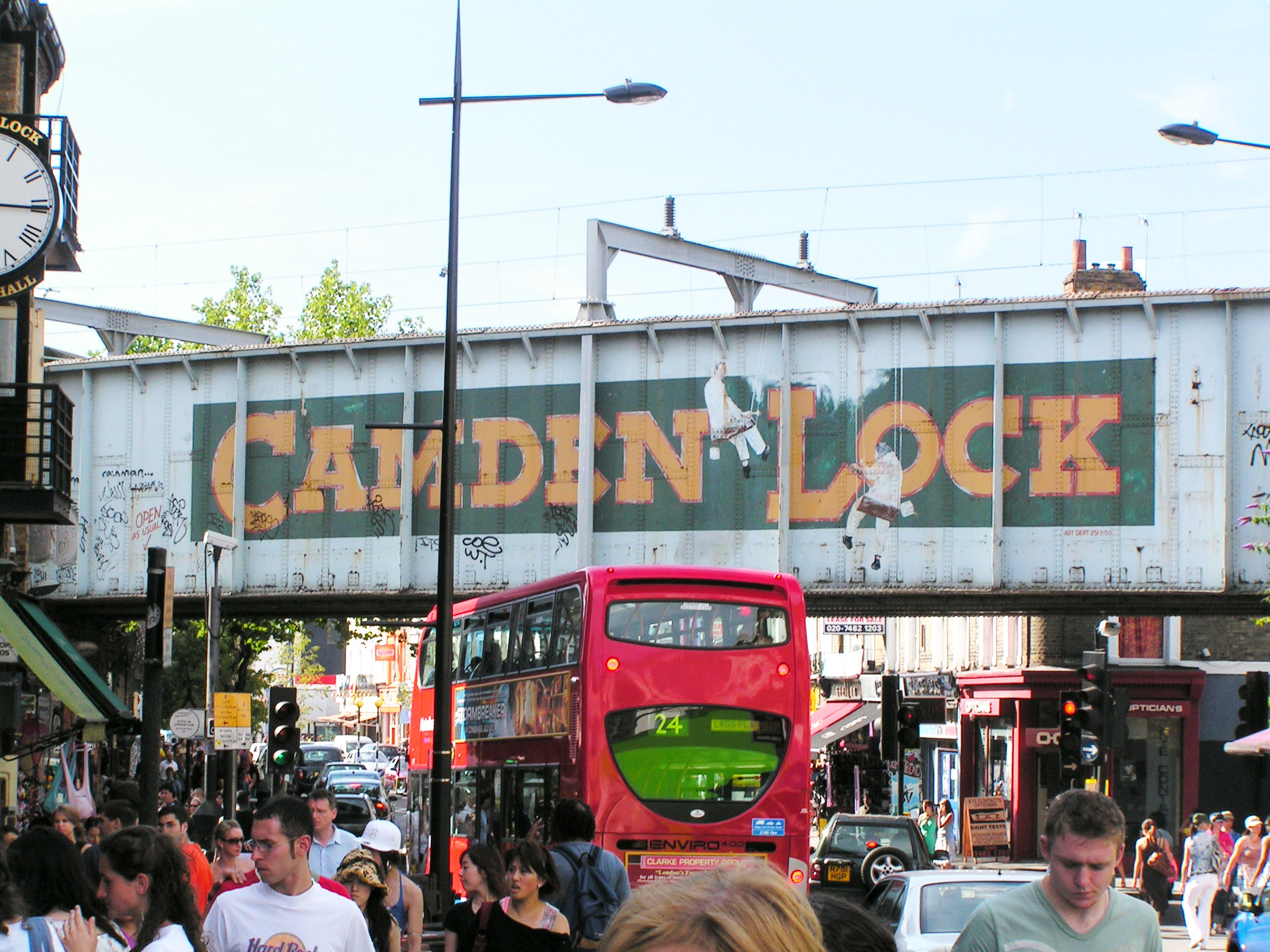
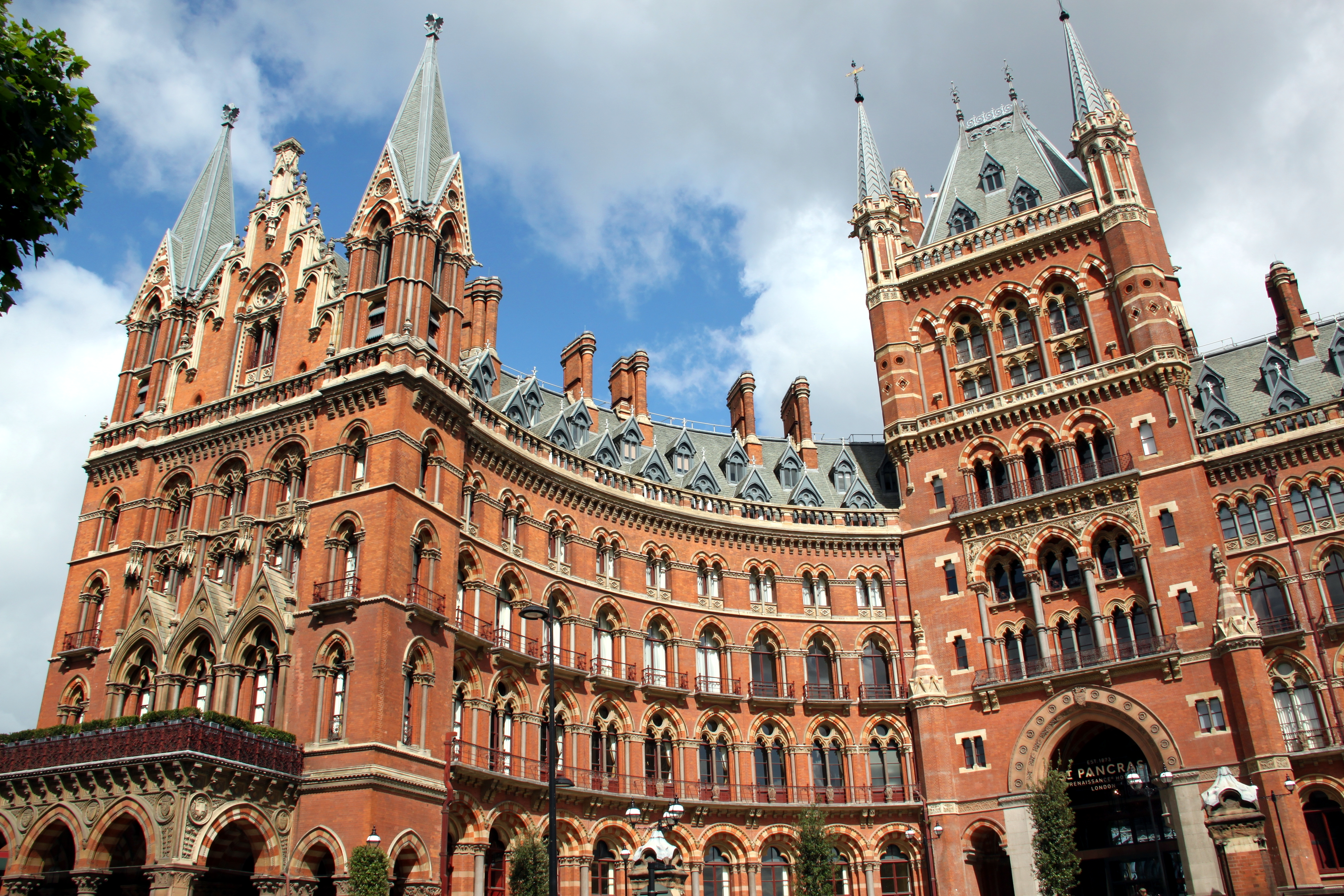
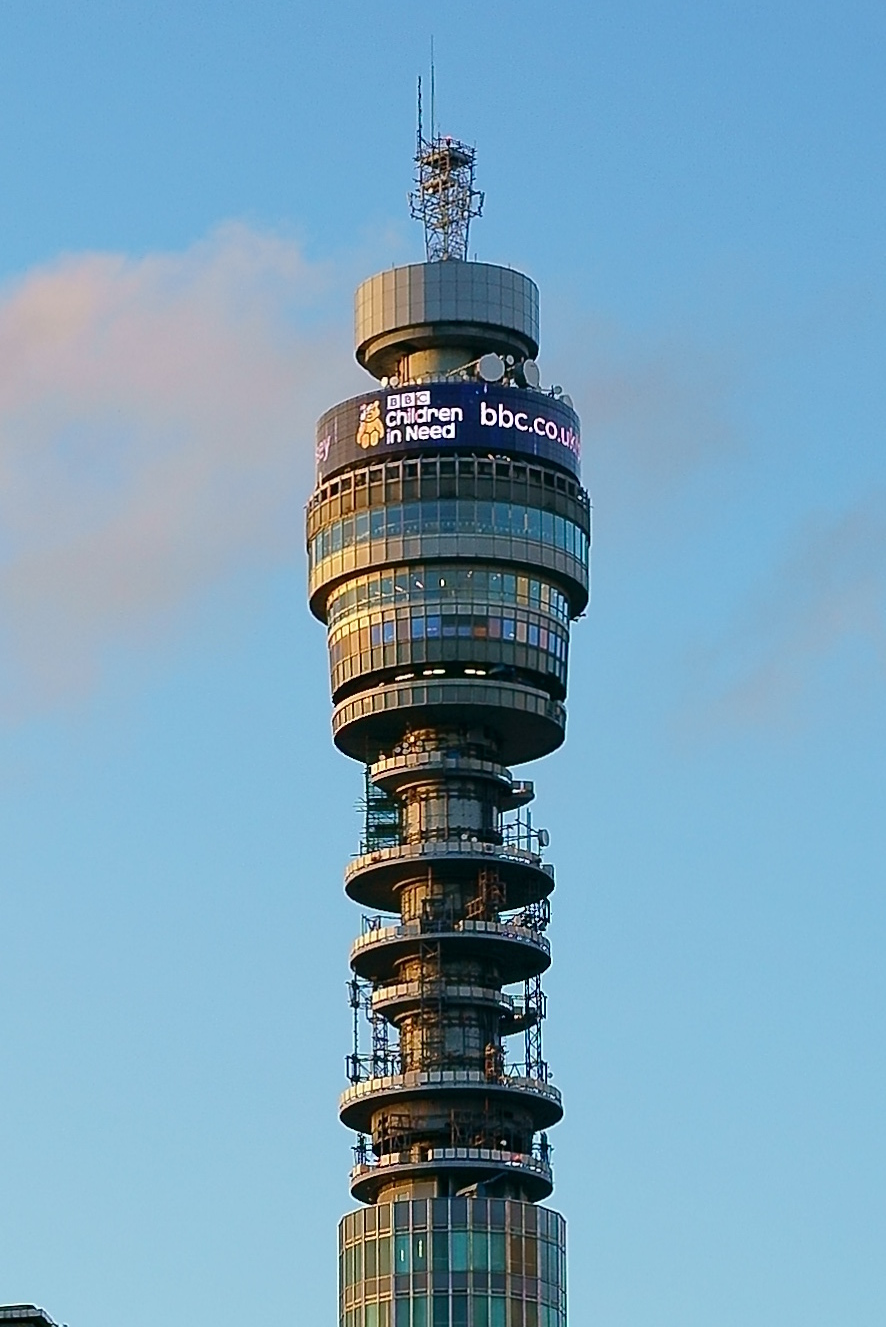
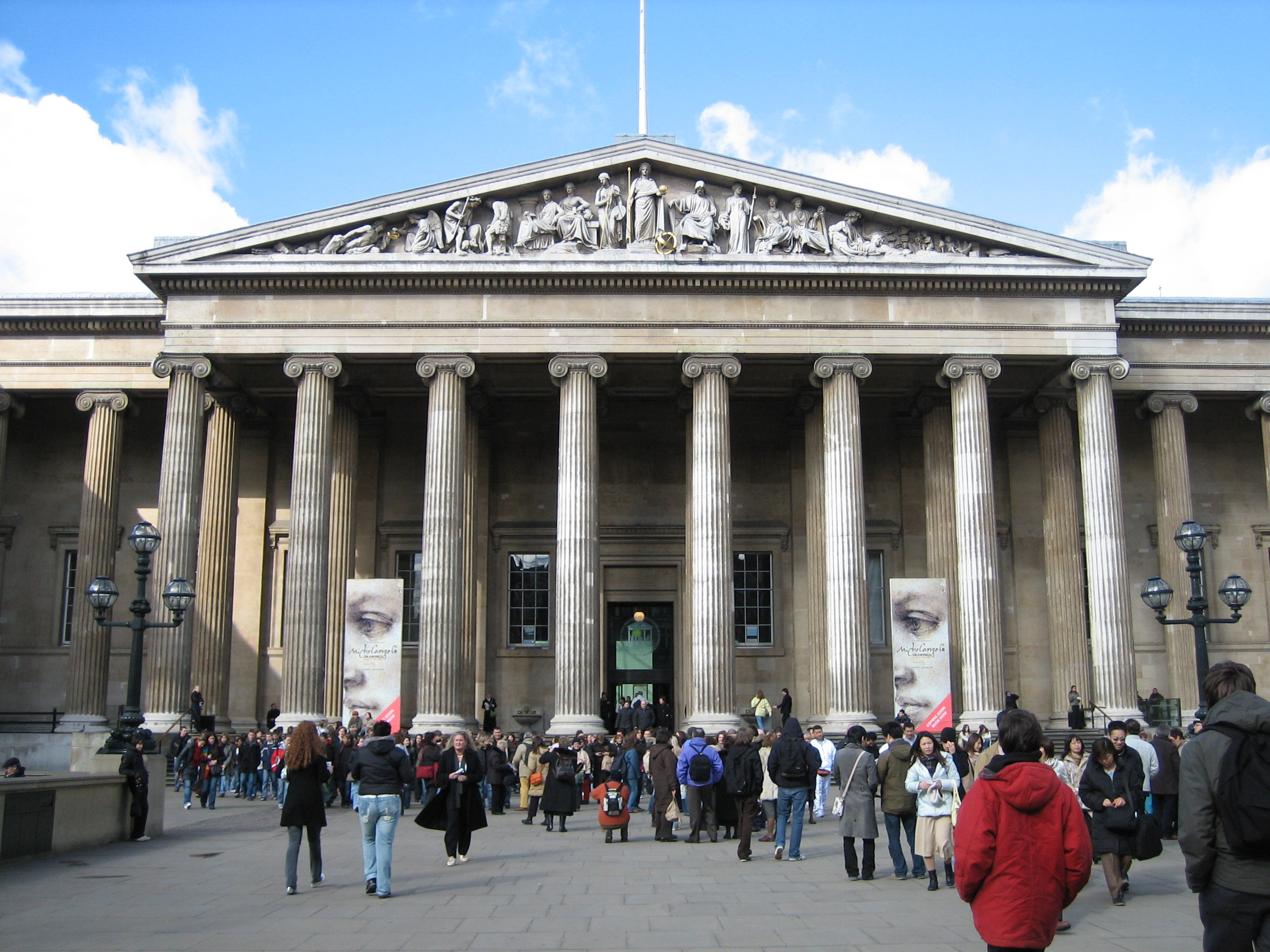
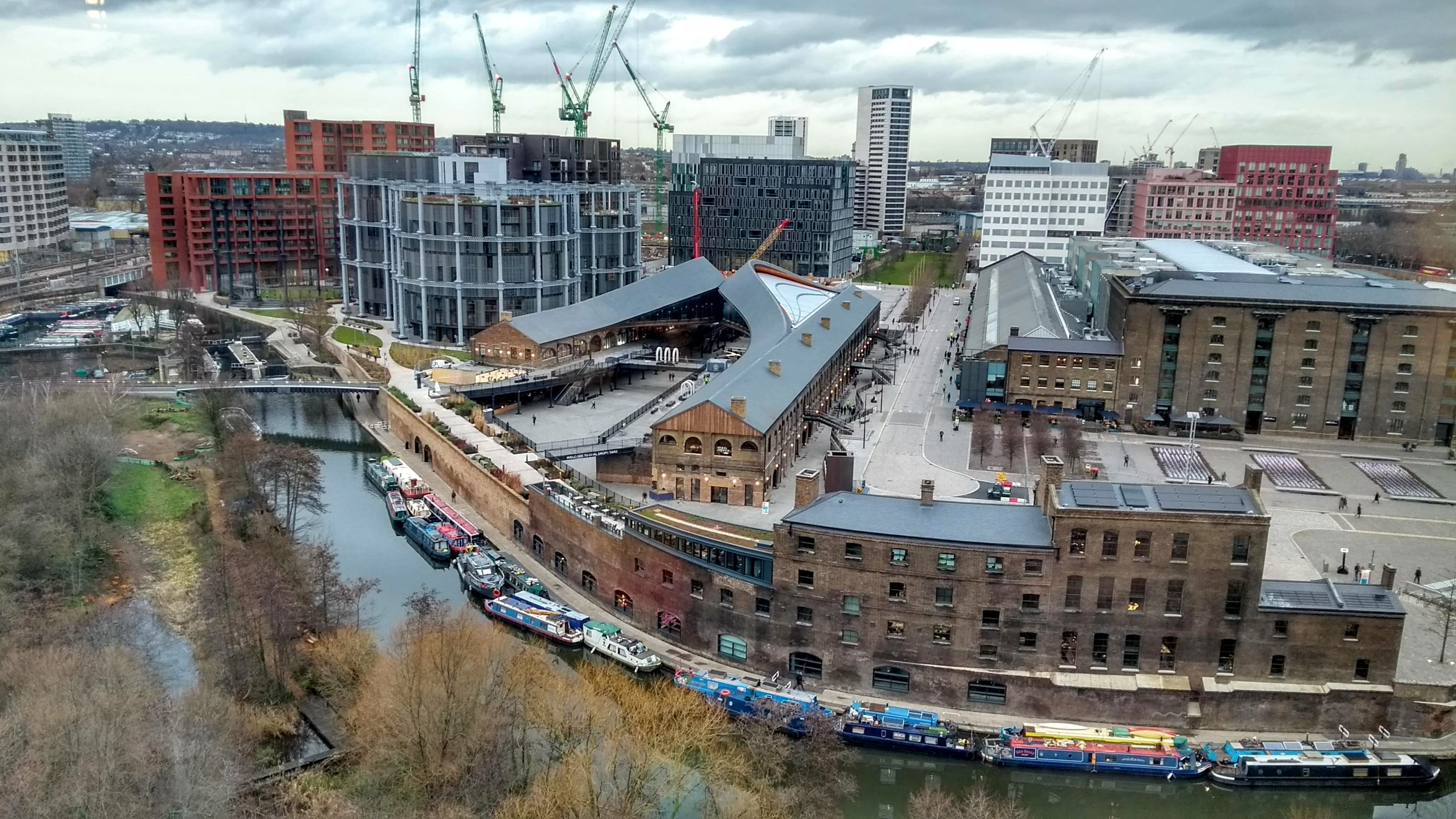
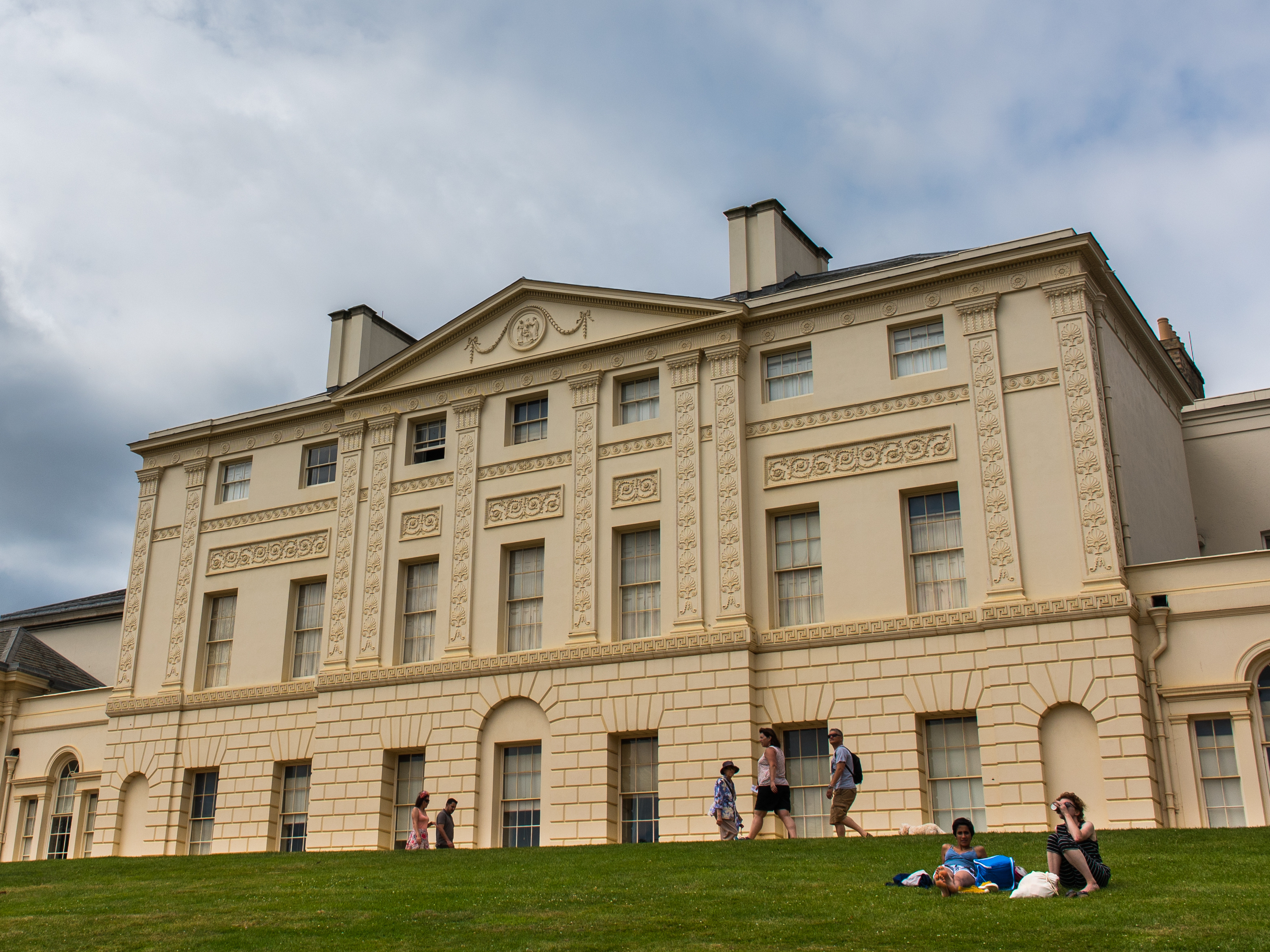
- From the top left; Top: Camden Lock railway bridge; St Pancras; Middle: BT Tower; the British Museum; Bottom: King's Cross Central; Kenwood House

- Coat of arms Council logo
- Motto(s): Non sibi, sed toti (Not for self, but for all)
- Camden shown within Greater London
- Sovereign state: United Kingdom
- Constituent country: England
- Region: London
- Ceremonial county: Greater London
- Created: 1 April 1965
- Admin HQ: 5 Pancras Square, King's Cross, London

Government
  - Type: London borough council
  - Body: Camden London Borough Council
  - London Assembly: Anne Clarke (Lab) AM for Barnet and Camden
  - MPs: Sagal Abdi-Wali (Lab); Tulip Siddiq (Lab)

Area
  - Total: 8.4 sq mi (21.8 km^{2})
  - Rank: 287th (of 296)

Population (2025)
  - Total: 216,658^{1}
  - Rank: 90th (of 296)
  - Density: 25,770/sq mi (9,948/km^{2})
  - Rank: 9th (of 296)
- Time zone: UTC (GMT)
  - Summer (DST): UTC+1 (BST)
- Postcodes: EC, N, NW, W, WC
- Area code: 020
- ISO 3166 code: GB-CMD
- GSS code: E09000007
- Police: Metropolitan Police
- Website: camden.gov.uk
- ^{1} There are concerns about the accuracy of this data

The London Borough of Camden (/ˈkæmdən/) is a borough in Inner London, England. Camden Town Hall, on Euston Road, lies 2 mi (3.2 km) north of Charing Cross. The borough was established on 1 April 1965 from the former metropolitan boroughs of Holborn, St Pancras and Hampstead.

To the south it shares with the City of Westminster parts of the West End, where it also borders the City of London. The cultural and commercial land uses in the south contrast with the bustling mixed-use districts such as Camden Town and Kentish Town in the centre and leafy residential areas around Hampstead Heath in the north. Well-known attractions include The British Museum, The British Library, the famous views from Parliament Hill, the London Zoo, the BT Tower, the converted Roundhouse entertainment venue, and Camden Market. As of 2021 it has a population of 210,136. Politically, its local authority is Camden London Borough Council.

== History ==
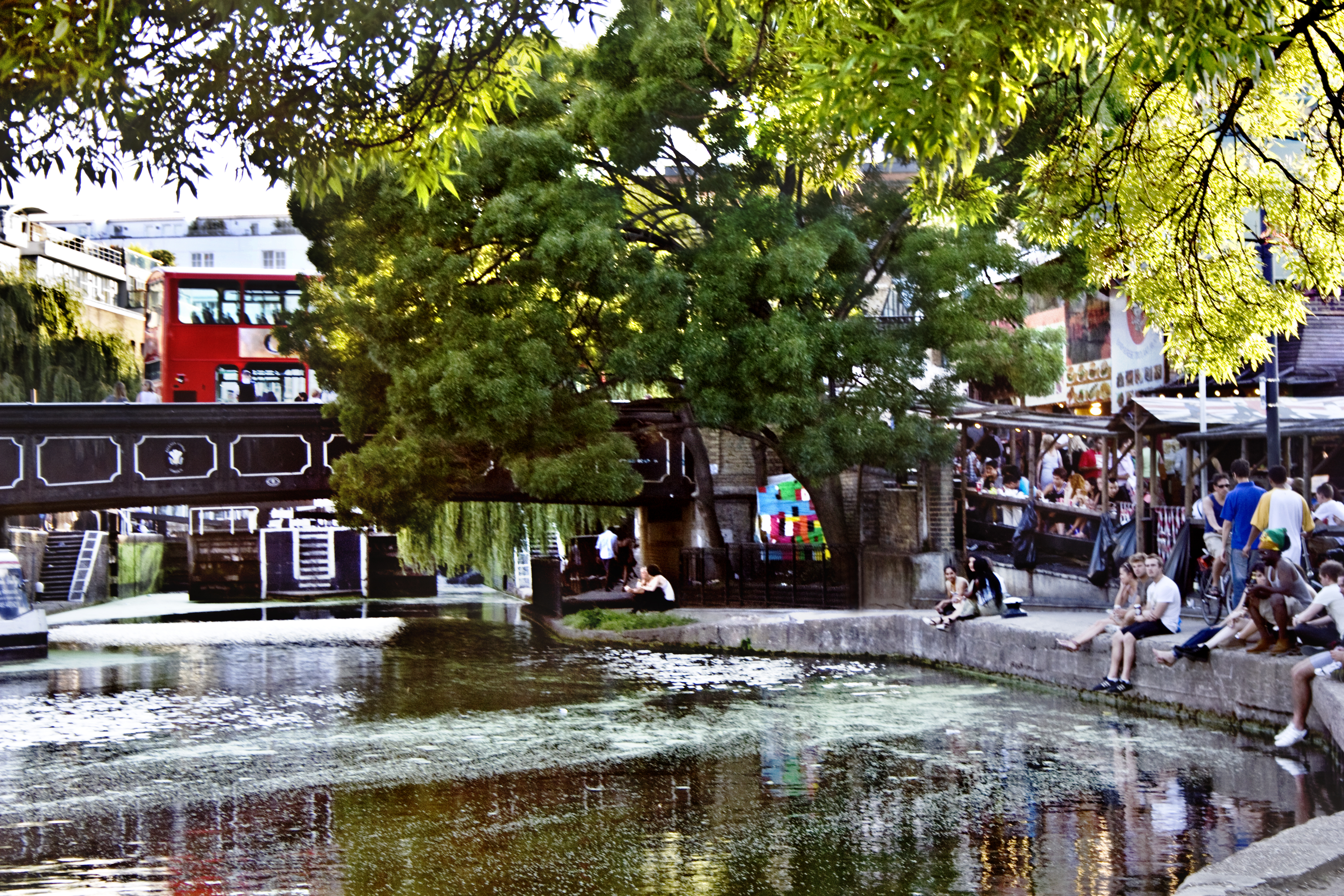
Former Camden Town market (2011); it was demolished in early 2015 to make room for the Hawley Wharf redevelopment project.

The area of the modern borough had historically been part of the county of Middlesex. From 1856 the area was governed by the Metropolitan Board of Works, which was established to provide services across the metropolis of London. In 1889 the Metropolitan Board of Works' area was made the County of London.

From 1856 until 1900 the lower tier of local government within the metropolis comprised various parish vestries and district boards. The ancient parishes of Hampstead and St Pancras were each governed by their vestry. The various smaller parishes and territories to the south were grouped into the St Giles District and Holborn District, each governed by a district board. In 1900 the lower tier was reorganised into metropolitan boroughs, including the Metropolitan Borough of Hampstead, the Metropolitan Borough of St Pancras (each covering the parish of the same name) and the Metropolitan Borough of Holborn, covering the combined area of the former St Giles District and Holborn District (subject to some boundary adjustments with neighbours on its south-eastern edges).

The London Borough of Camden was created in 1965 under the London Government Act 1963. It covered the combined area of the three metropolitan boroughs of Hampstead, Holborn, and St Pancras, which were all abolished. The initial Herbert Commission report recommended that the new borough consist of St Pancras and Hampstead, but Holborn was later added.

According to Enid Wistrich, who was a member of Hampstead Council at the time, the name "Camden" was the idea of Alderman Room, the Leader of Hampstead Council, and Mr Wilson, the Town Clerk, while travelling in a taxi through Camden Town. The name "Fleet" had also been suggested, after the underground river that flowed through the three boroughs, but that was rejected as the river was little more than a sewer. Other suggestions included "Penhamborn", 'Bornhamcras" and "Hohampion". Government guidelines for the naming of the new boroughs suggested that the chosen name should be short and simple, and ideally one that was generally associated with the centre of the new Borough. The name "Camden" met those criteria.

The name "Camden Town" was derived from Camden Place, the seat of Charles Pratt, 1st Earl Camden who had owned and developed land in the area in the 1790s.

The transcribed diaries of William Copeland Astbury describe Camden and the surrounding areas in great detail from 1829 to 1848.

There are 183 English Heritage blue plaques in the borough of Camden representing the many diverse personalities that have lived there.

== Geography and economy ==
The area of the old parish and borough of Hampstead in the north-west includes Belsize Park and part of Kilburn. The old parish and borough of St Pancras, which occupies most of the modern borough, includes Camden Town, Kentish Town, Gospel Oak, Somers Town, King's Cross, Chalk Farm, Dartmouth Park, the core area of Fitzrovia and a part of Highgate.

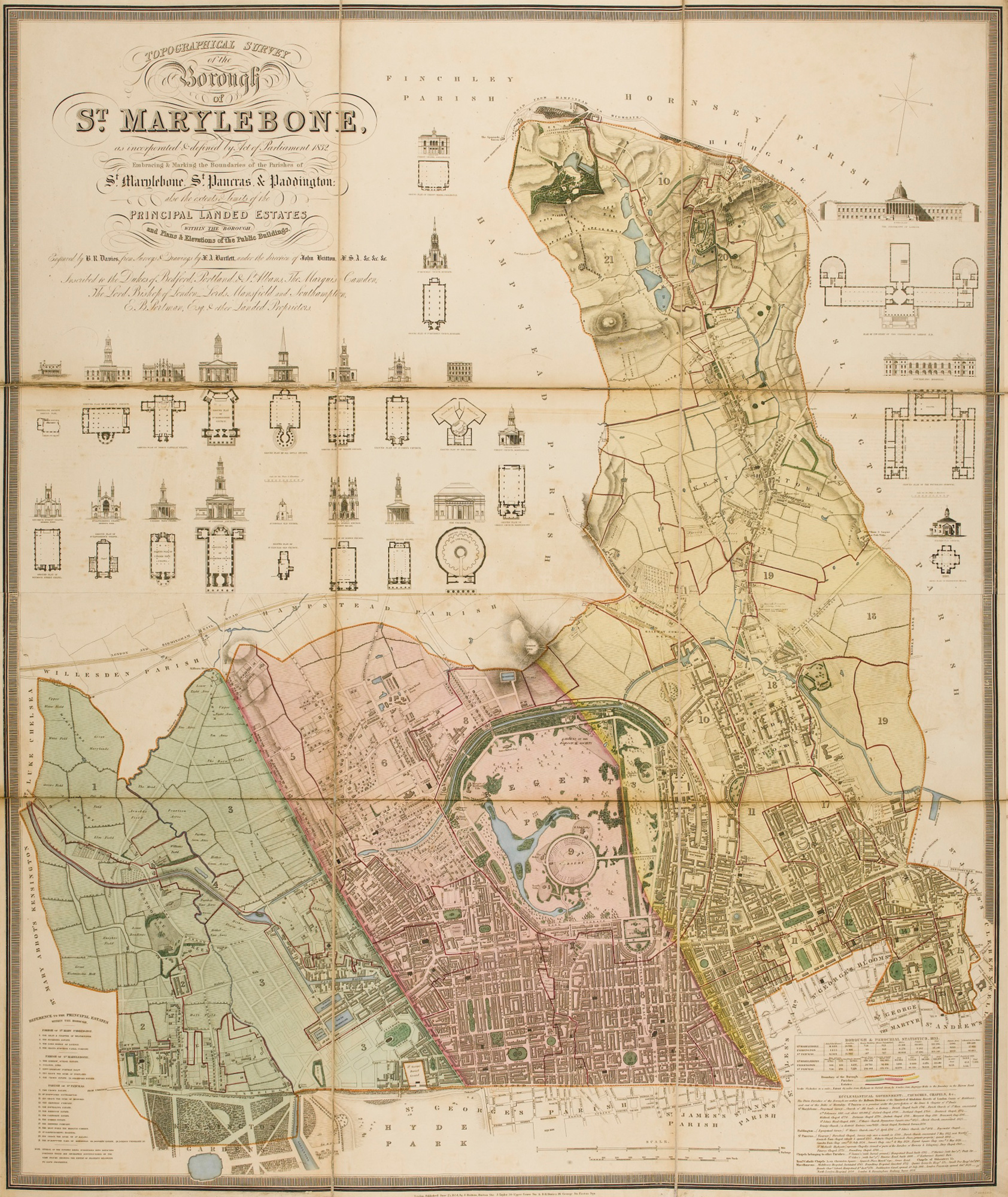
The Ancient Parishes of – west to east – Paddington and St Marylebone (in the modern City of Westminster), and St Pancras (in the modern London Borough of Camden) in 1834

In the south, the old Borough of Holborn was formed from the combined parish of Bloomsbury and St Giles, and most of the parish of Holborn (with the remaining part in the ancient Farringdon Without ward of the City of London).

The economy and land uses of the West End and other southern parts of the borough reflect their more central location. Camden has the seventh largest economy in the UK with a number of major companies headquartered in the borough; Google is in the process of completing a major headquarter building in King's Cross. Camden Town Brewery is among the newer businesses that have thrived in the borough.

In the far south of the borough, Lincoln's Inn Fields is within 500 metres of the Thames. The northern part of the borough includes the less densely developed areas of Hampstead, Hampstead Heath and Kentish Town. There are a number of Parks and open spaces in the London Borough of Camden. Neighbouring boroughs are the City of Westminster and the City of London to the south, Brent to the west of the originally Roman Watling Street (now the A5 Road), Barnet and Haringey to the north and Islington to the east. It covers all or part of the N1, N6, N7, N19, NW1, NW2, NW3, NW5, NW6, NW8, EC1, WC1, WC2, W1 and W9 postcode areas.

For planning policy purposes, the London Plan places Camden in the 'Central London' group of boroughs.

== Governance and politics ==
The local authority is Camden Council, which meets at Camden Town Hall (formerly St Pancras Town Hall) in Judd Street in St Pancras, and has its headquarters at 5 Panrcas Square.

A map showing the wards of Camden since 2022

Borough councillors are elected every four years. Since May 2022 the electoral wards in Camden are:

- Belsize
- Bloomsbury
- Camden Square
- Fortune Green
- Frognal
- Gospel Oak
- Hampstead Town
- Haverstock
- Highgate
- Holborn and Covent Garden
- Kentish Town North
- Kentish Town South
- Kilburn
- King's Cross
- Primrose Hill
- Regent's Park
- St Pancras and Somers Town
- West Hampstead
- South Hampstead Ward, formerly Swiss Cottage Ward

=== Greater London representation ===
Since 2000, Camden forms part of the Barnet and Camden London Assembly constituency, represented by Anne Clarke of the Labour Party.

=== UK Parliament ===
There are two parliamentary constituencies covering Camden: Hampstead and Highgate in the north, represented by Labour's Tulip Siddiq, and Holborn and St Pancras in the south, represented by Keir Starmer, the former Prime Minister of the United Kingdom.

== Demographics ==
Population
Year	Pop.	±%
1801	96,795	—
1811	124,741	+28.9%
1821	158,077	+26.7%
1831	192,228	+21.6%
1841	228,950	+19.1%
1851	270,197	+18.0%
1861	301,408	+11.6%
1871	332,619	+10.4%
1881	363,830	+9.4%
1891	376,500	+3.5%
1901	362,581	−3.7%
1911	349,184	−3.7%
1921	335,408	−3.9%
1931	322,212	−3.9%
1941	286,956	−10.9%
1951	255,558	−10.9%
1961	231,143	−9.6%
1971	209,097	−9.5%
1981	161,100	−23.0%
1991	181,489	+12.7%
2001	198,027	+9.1%
2011	220,338	+11.3%
2021	210,136	−4.6%
2024 estimate	216,943	+3.2%
Source: A Vision of Britain through time and the ONS 2024 estimate

In 1801, the civil parishes that form the modern borough were already developed and had a total population of 96,795. This continued to rise swiftly throughout the 19th century as the district became built up, reaching 270,197 in the middle of the century. When the railways arrived the rate of population growth slowed, for while many people were drawn in by new employment, others were made homeless by the new central London termini and construction of lines through the district. The population peaked at 376,500 in the 1890s, after which official efforts began to clear the overcrowded slums around St Pancras and Holborn.

Following World War II, further suburban public housing was built to rehouse the many Londoners made homeless in the Blitz, and there was an exodus from London towards the new towns under the Abercrombie Plan for London (1944). As industry declined during the 1970s the population continued to decline, falling to 161,100 at the start of the 1980s. It has now begun to rise again with new housing developments on brownfield sites and the release of railway and gas work lands around Kings Cross. A 2017 study found that the eviction rate of 6 per 1,000 renting households in Camden is the lowest rate in London.

Population pyramid of the Borough of Camden in 2021

The 2001 census gave Camden a population of 198,000, an undercount that was later revised to 202,600. The latest ONS projection puts the 2019 population at 270,000.

On 20 May 1999, the Camden New Journal newspaper documented 'Two Camdens' syndrome as a high-profile phenomenon differentiating the characteristics of education services in its constituencies. In 2006, Dame Julia Neuberger's book reported similar variation as a characteristic of Camden's children's health services. Her insider's view was corroboration – in addition to the 2001 "Inequalities" report by Director of Public Health Maggie Barker of "stark contrasts in" health and education opportunities – of earlier similar Audit Commission findings and a verification/update of the 1999 CNJ report.

=== Ethnicity ===
The following table shows the ethnic group of respondents in the 2001 and 2011 census in Camden.

Ethnic group	Year					
Ethnic group	2001 census		2011 census		2021 census	
Ethnic group	Number	%	Number	%	Number	%
White: Total	144,896	73.17%	146,055	66.29%	125,064	59.6%
White: British	104,390	52.72%	96,937	43.99%	74,348	35.4%
White: Irish	9,149	4.62%	7,053	3.20%	5,325	2.5%
White: Gypsy or Irish Traveller	–	–	167	0.08%	128	0.1%
White: Roma	–	–	–	–	978	0.5%
White: Other	31,357	15.84%	41,898	19.02%	44,285	21.1%
Asian or Asian British: Total	24,021	12.13%	35,446	16.09%	38,042	18.1%
Asian or Asian British: Indian	4,574	2.31%	6,083	2.76%	6,952	3.3%
Asian or Asian British: Pakistani	1,250	0.63%	1,489	0.68%	1,610	0.8%
Asian or Asian British: Bangladeshi	12,569	6.35%	12,503	5.67%	14,356	6.8%
Asian or Asian British: Chinese	3,470	1.75%	6,493	2.95%	6,728	3.2%
Asian or Asian British: Other Asian	2,158	1.09%	8,878	4.03%	8,396	4.0%
Black or Black British: Total	16,374	8.27%	18,060	8.20%	18,892	9.1%
Black or Black British: African	11,795	5.96%	10,802	4.90%	14,191	6.8%
Black or Black British: Caribbean	3,635	1.84%	3,496	1.59%	2,703	1.3%
Black or Black British: Other Black	944	0.48%	3,762	1.71%	1,998	1.0%
Mixed or British Mixed: Total	7,429	3.75%	12,322	5.59%	13,938	6.6%
Mixed: White and Black Caribbean	1,654	0.84%	2,494	1.13%	2,558	1.2%
Mixed: White and Black African	1,224	0.62%	1,800	0.82%	2,059	1.0%
Mixed: White and Asian	1,983	1.00%	3,880	1.76%	4,243	2.0%
Mixed: Other Mixed	2,568	1.30%	4,148	1.88%	5,078	2.4%
Other: Total	5,300	2.68%	8,455	3.84%	14,200	6.8%
Other: Arab	–	–	3,432	1.56%	4,417	2.1%
Other: Any other ethnic group	–	–	5,023	2.28%	9,783	4.7%
Ethnic minority: Total	53,124	26.83%	74,283	33.71%	85,072	40.4%
Total	198,020	100%	220,338	100%	210,136	100%

Ethnic group	Year					
Ethnic group	1966 estimations	1971 estimations	1981 estimations		1991 census	
Ethnic group	%	%	Number	%	Number	%
White: Total	94.5%	92.2%	161,478	88.2%	149,490	82.3%
White: British	–	–	–	–	–	–
White: Irish	7.7%	–	–	–	–	–
White: Gypsy or Irish Traveller	–	–	–	–	–	–
White: Roma	–	–	–	–	–	–
White: Other	–	–	–	–	–	–
Asian or Asian British: Total	2.7%	–	10,612	5.8%	17,180	9.5%
Asian or Asian British: Indian	–	–	2,442		2,974	
Asian or Asian British: Pakistani	–	–	608		796	
Asian or Asian British: Bangladeshi	–	–	2,765	1.5%	6,718	
Asian or Asian British: Chinese	–	–	2,271		2,652	
Asian or Asian British: Other Asian	–	–	2,526		4,040	
Black or Black British: Total	2.8%	–	7,385	4%	9,809	5.4%
Black or Black British: African	1.3%	–	3,196	1.7%	4,664	
Black or Black British: Caribbean	1.5%	–	2,762	1.5%	3,279	
Black or Black British: Other Black	–	–	1,427		1,866	
Mixed or British Mixed: Total	–	–	–	–	–	–
Mixed: White and Black Caribbean	–	–	–	–	–	–
Mixed: White and Black African	–	–	–	–	–	–
Mixed: White and Asian	–	–	–	–	–	–
Mixed: Other Mixed	–	–	–	–	–	–
Other: Total	–	–	3,768		5,220	
Other: Arab	–	–	–	–	–	–
Other: Any other ethnic group	–	–	–	–	–	–
Ethnic minority: Total	5.5%	7.8%	21,765	11.8%	32,209	17.7%
Total	100%	100%	183,243	100%	181,699	100%

=== Religion ===
Religious makeup of Camden by single year age groups in 2021

The following shows the religious identity of residents residing in Camden according to the 2001, 2011 and the 2021 censuses.

Religion	2001		2011		2021	
Religion	Number	%	Number	%	Number	%
Holds religious beliefs	134,545	67.9	118,949	54.0	118,581	56.4
Christian	93,259	47.1	74,821	34.0	65,980	31.4
Muslims	22,906	11.6	26,643	12.1	33,830	16.1
Jewish	11,153	5.6	9,823	4.5	10,079	4.8
Hindu	3,031	1.5	3,141	1.4	3,991	1.9
Sikh	443	0.2	465	0.2	487	0.2
Buddhist	2,595	1.3	2,789	1.3	2,410	1.1
Other religion	1,161	0.6	1,267	0.6	1,842	0.9
No religion	43,609	22.0	56,113	25.5	72,776	34.6
Religion not stated	19,866	10.0	45,276	20.5	18,743	8.9
Total population	198,020	100.0	220,338	100.0	210,100	100.0
Note: The number of residents in the "Religion not stated" category in 2011 was overestimated due to an error processing the 2011 census data

=== Immigration ===
This list includes top-15 sources of immigration to Borough of Camden for 2021 census:

#	Country	Number
1	United States	5,912
2	Bangladesh	5,814
3	France	5,265
4	Italy	4,442
5	India	3,270
6	China	3,111
7	Ireland	3,064
8	Somalia	2,954
9	Germany	2,408
10	Spain	2,309
11	Australia	2,069
12	Philippines	2,063
13	Iran	1,943
14	Kosovo	1,919
15	Poland	1,901

== Landmarks ==
=== Parks and open spaces ===
London is well known for its greenery and the Parks and open spaces in the London Borough of Camden make an important contribution to this. Hampstead Heath is well known for its view over London, notably from Parliament Hill, its wild nature and its Hampstead Heath Ponds. Camden shares Regents Park with Westminster and the views from Primrose Hill are famous.

=== Attractions ===
- Bloomsbury Theatre
- BT Tower
- Camden Art Centre
- Camden Catacombs (see also Catacombs of London)
- Camden Market
- Camden People's Theatre
- Parts of Covent Garden
- Dickens House
- Dominion Theatre
- Drama Centre London
- Euston station
- Fenton House
- Foundling Museum
- Freud Museum
- Grant Museum of Zoology
- Gray's Inn
- Hampstead Cemetery
- Hampstead Heath
- Hatton Garden
- Highgate Cemetery
- Jewish Museum London
- Keats' House
- Kenwood House
- King's Cross railway station
- Lincoln's Inn
- Parliament Hill Lido
- Phoenix Garden
- The eastern part of Regent's Park is in the borough
- The Place
- The Roundhouse
- Russell Square
- Shaftesbury Theatre
- Sir John Soane's Museum
- Upstairs at The Gatehouse
- World's End (Camden)
- London Zoo
- London Astoria
- Electric Ballroom
- Wellcome Collection
- Primrose Hill
- St. Pancras Library
- St Pancras railway station
- Camden Arts Project

== Education ==
The Borough of Camden is home to a large number of primary, secondary and tertiary institutions. Over recent years, a number of significant institutions have moved into the borough or are planning to do so. The included Central Saint Martins, the Francis Crick Institute, as well as the planned move by Moorfields Eye Hospital, recently unveiled as Project Oriel.

=== Primary schools ===
The London Borough of Camden is the local education authority for the borough, organised through the Children, Schools and Families directorate.

=== Major public and private bodies ===
Some of London's best universities and teaching institutions are located in the Borough of Camden. They include the main campus of University College London, part of the campus of the London School of Economics near Lincoln's Inn Fields, and Central Saint Martins.

- The Architectural Association
- Birkbeck, University of London
- The British Library
- British Medical Association
- The British Museum
- Cancer Research UK
- Central Saint Martins
- Fordham University (London Centre)
- Francis Crick Institute
- Friends House
- Great Ormond Street Hospital
- Goodenough College
- London School of Hygiene & Tropical Medicine (part of University of London)
- New York University (NYU London)
- National Hospital for Neurology and Neurosurgery
- National Union of Students
- Royal Academy of Dramatic Art
- Royal Central School of Speech and Drama
- Royal College of Anaesthetists
- Royal College of General Practitioners
- Royal College of Paediatrics and Child Health
- Royal College of Physicians
- Royal College of Surgeons
- Royal College of Veterinary Surgeons
- Royal Free Hospital
- Royal Veterinary College (Camden Campus)
- Senate House (University of London)
- School of Oriental and African Studies
- Slade School of Fine Art
- St Pancras Hospital
- Student Central
- Trades Union Congress (TUC)
- University College Hospital
- University College London
- The University of Law
- University of London Union
- Wellcome Trust
- Working Men's College

== Public services ==
=== Police ===
Camden is policed by the Metropolitan Police Service. There are two police stations across the borough, situated at Holborn and Kentish Town. There are various other contact points around the borough including West Hampstead, Greenland Road, Highgate Road, Station House (Swiss Cottage), West End Lane, Hampstead Town Hall and Kingsway College. All locations have varying opening hours with Kentish Town Police Station open to the public on a 24-hour basis.

Hampstead Heath, situated within the London Borough of Camden and managed by the City of London Corporation, has its own Constabulary who deal with everyday incidents on the Heath, however, all serious criminal offences are passed to the Metropolitan Police to investigate.

With a large London Underground network and major railway stations such as King's Cross, St Pancras and Euston, Camden also has a much larger presence of British Transport Police (BTP) than many other London boroughs. BTP are responsible for policing Great Britain's railway network.

=== London Fire Brigade ===
The area has three fire stations: Euston, Kentish Town and West Hampstead and they are operated by London Fire Brigade in the borough of Camden. None of these fire stations are home to any specialist units; only pumping appliances and a rescue tender.

=== Public libraries ===
Camden is the home of the British Library. In addition, Camden has numerous libraries which include:

- Swiss Cottage Library
- Holborn Library
- Camden Town Library
- Kentish Town Library
- Pancras Square Library
- West Hampstead Library
- Kilburn Library
- Highgate Library
- Queens Crescent Library

As well as a number of community libraries including Keats community library.

== Transport ==
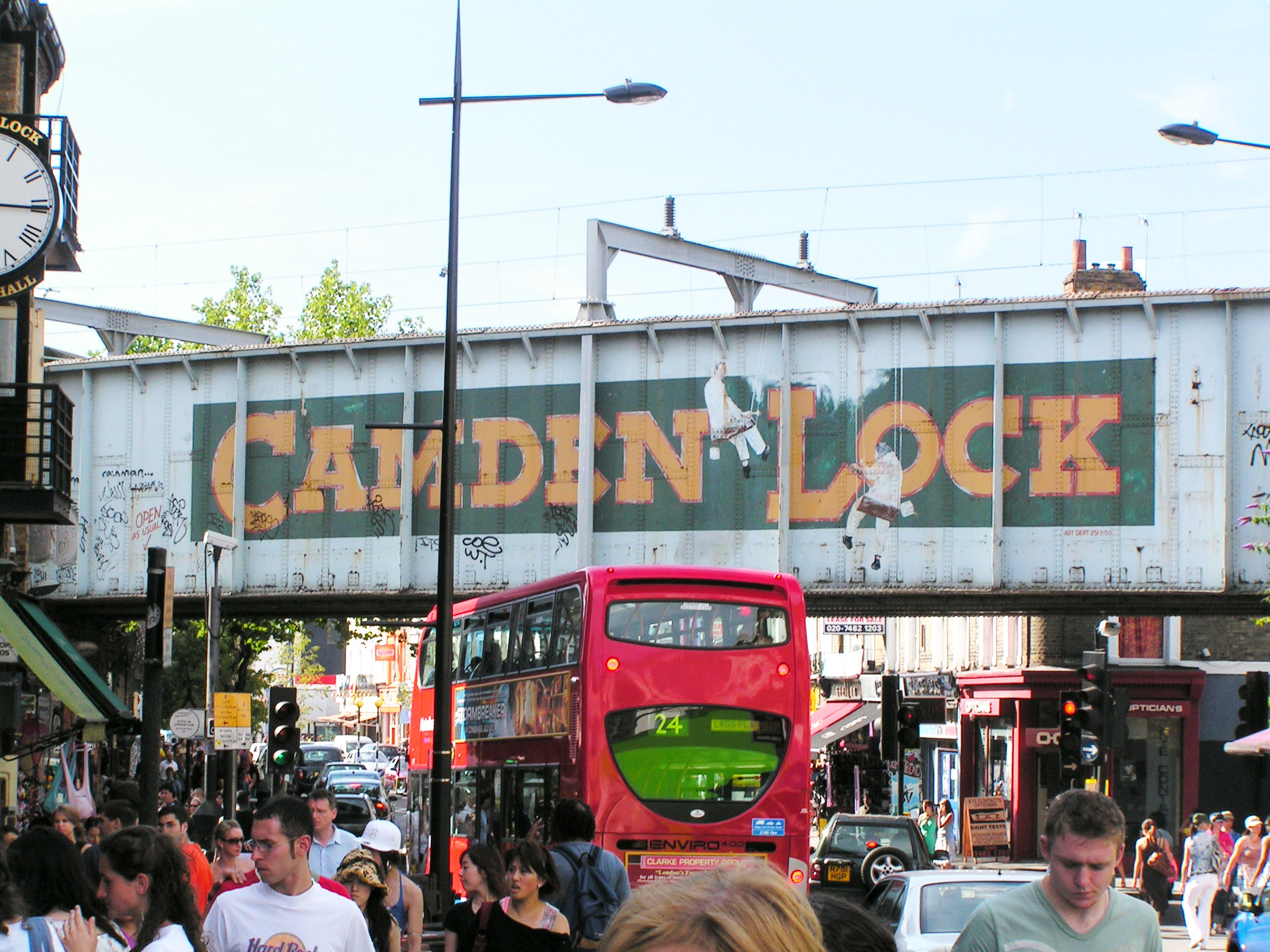
View of the railway bridge over Camden High St. which carries the North London Line

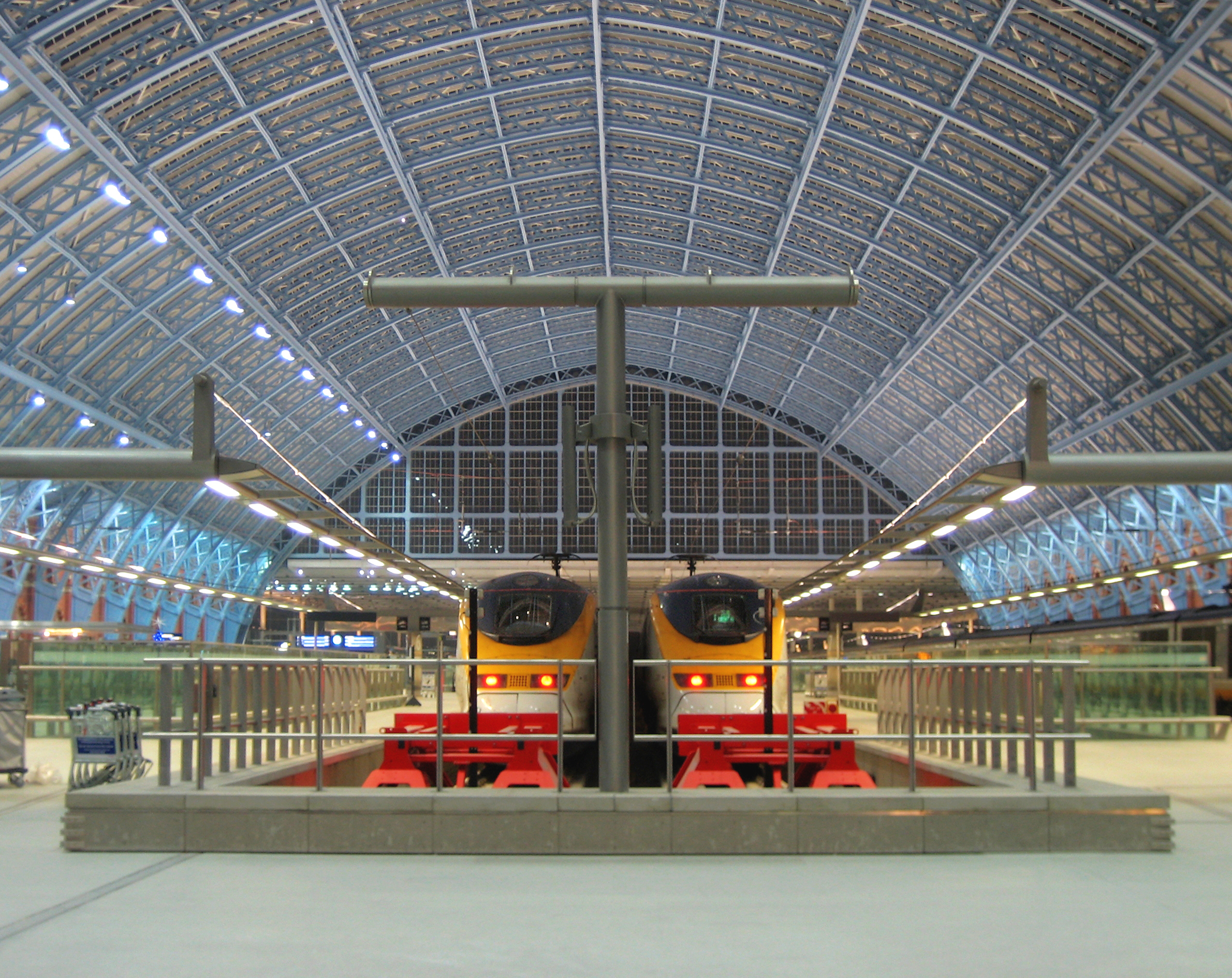
St Pancras International – home to Eurostar trains

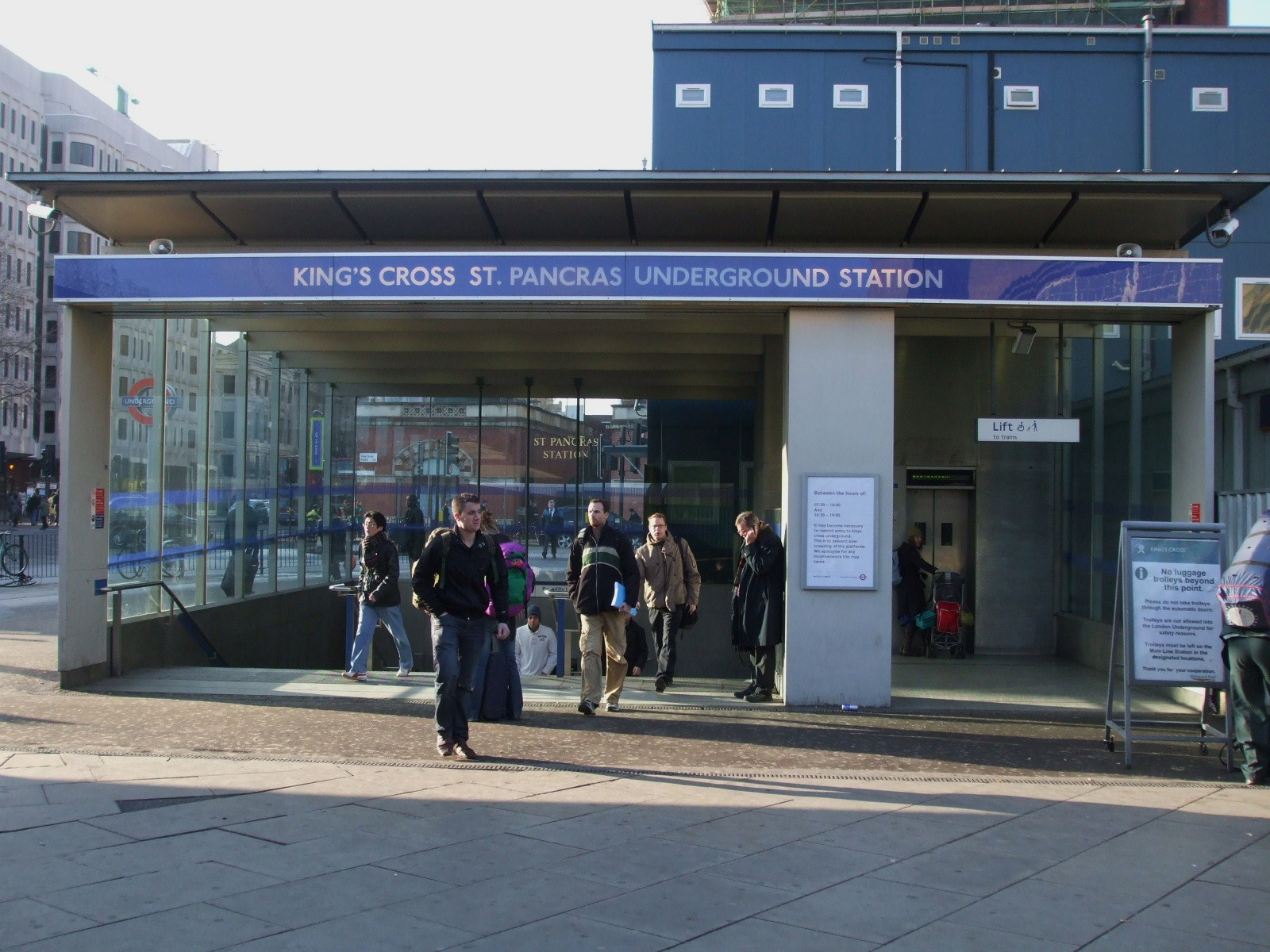
King's Cross St Pancras tube station served by the most tube lines on the network

There are no motorways in the borough, and few stretches of dual carriageway road, but the borough has great strategic transport significance to London, due to presence of three of the capital's most important rail termini, which are lined up along the Euston Road.

The position of the railway termini on Euston Road, rather than in a more central position further south, is a result of the influential recommendations of the 1846 Royal Commission on Metropolitan Railway Termini that sought to protect the West End districts a short distance south of the road.

=== Rail ===
==== National Rail ====
Three of the fourteen central London's railway terminals are located in the borough. Euston, St Pancras and Kings Cross are the London termini for the West Coast, Midland and East Coast Main Lines and also High Speed 1. This connects the borough with the East of England, East Midlands, West Midlands, North East & West England, North Wales, Scotland, South East England, France, Belgium and the Netherlands.

Since 14 November 2007 when St Pancras International became the new terminus of Eurostar, a major regeneration of the area has occurred with the King's Cross Central development happening behind the station.

London Overground's North London Line services run through the borough serving Camden Road, Kentish Town West, Gospel Oak, Hampstead Heath, Finchley Road & Frognal and West Hampstead. London Overground also operates the Watford DC Line services from Euston serving South Hampstead, trains continue to Watford in Hertfordshire.

Thameslink route services serve St Pancras, Kentish Town and West Hampstead Thameslink stations. Currently the Thameslink network is undergoing a major expansion project called the Thameslink Programme. This will link more places in Southern England to the borough and to the East of England. While some services on the Great Northern network, which currently terminate at King's Cross will be diverted onto the Thameslink network, all work is due to be complete by 2016.

==== Underground ====
The London Borough of Camden is served by 18 London Underground stations and 8 of the 11 lines.

The three major rail termini are served by two underground stations, Euston and the combined King's Cross St Pancras station. Between them, the termini are served by the Circle, Hammersmith & City, Metropolitan, Northern, Piccadilly and Victoria lines. The Central and Jubilee lines serve other parts of the borough, as does the Elizabeth line.

As well as the two major termini stations, the borough's other stations are: Euston Square, Warren Street, Goodge Street, Tottenham Court Road, Holborn, Russell Square, Chancery Lane, Mornington Crescent, Camden Town, Chalk Farm, Belsize Park, Hampstead, West Hampstead, Finchley Road, Swiss Cottage and Kentish Town.

==== Future ====
The proposed High Speed 2 railway line to northern England is intended to terminate at Euston Station. The proposed Crossrail 2 line, (originally referred to as the Chelsea–Hackney line) would serve Euston and Tottenham Court Road underground stations. The increase in passengers at Euston as a result of the proposed High Speed 2 services is a major driver of the proposals.

The formerly proposed Cross River Tram was going to start in the borough of Camden but was scrapped by the former mayor of London Boris Johnson in 2008.

=== Buses ===
All bus services are operated by Transport for London. Buses serve every suburb in the borough.

=== Statistics ===
The 2011 census found that the main forms of transport that residents used to travel to work were: underground, metro, light rail, tram, 21.5% of all residents aged 16–74; on foot, 9.2%; bus, minibus or coach, 9.2%; driving a car or van, 6.3%; work mainly at or from home, 5.2%; train, 4.1%; bicycle, 4.1%.

The census also found that 61% of households had no car, 32% had one car and 7% of households had 2 or more cars. There were an estimated 46,000 cars belonging to Camden residents."Camden Borough Profile" (PDF).

=== Speed limit ===
From 16 December 2013, Camden Council introduced a borough-wide speed limit of 20 miles per hour (32 km/h), as of 2022, this was expanded to Transport for London red routes. This is to make roads safer for cyclists and pedestrians.

== Culture ==
Camden has a long-established reputation as a centre for arts and culture, with numerous museums, galleries, theatres and music venues. Contemporary visual arts are represented by institutions including the Camden Arts Centre and, since 2025, Camden Arts Projects, a non-profit contemporary arts organisation based in the Grade II-listed former Wesleyan Methodist Chapel at 176 Prince of Wales Road, which presents exhibitions, artist commissions, performances and public programmes.

== See also ==
- Camden Head
- Camden bench
