= Subterranean London =

Structures beneath London

Subterranean London refers to a number of subterranean structures that lie beneath London. The city has been occupied by humans for two millennia. Over time, the capital has acquired a vast number of these structures and spaces, often as a result of war and conflict.

== Water and waste ==
The River Thames runs west–east through the centre of London. Many tributaries flow into it. Over time these changed from water sources to untreated sewers and disease sources. As the city developed from a cluster of villages, many of the Thames tributaries were buried or converted into canals.

The rivers failed to carry all the sewage of the growing metropolis. The resulting health crisis led to the creation of the London sewerage system (designed by Joseph Bazalgette) in the late nineteenth century. It was one of the world's first modern sewer systems and is still in use today, having been designed to account for the city's continued growth.

The Thames Water Ring Main is a notable large-scale water supply infrastructure, comprising 80 kilometres of wide-bore water-carrying tunnels.

The Thames Tideway Tunnel, which became fully operational in 2025, is a deep tunnel 25 km (16 mi) long, running mostly under the tidal section of the River Thames through central London to capture, store and convey almost all the raw sewage and rainwater that would otherwise overflow into the river.

== Transport ==
The London Underground was the world's first underground railway and one of its most extensive. Its construction began in 1860 with the 3.7-mile (6.0 km) Metropolitan Railway from Farringdon to Paddington. It opened in 1863, after much disruption from the use of "cut-and-cover" techniques that involved digging large trenches along the course of existing roads, and then constructing a roof over the excavation to reinstate the road surface.

Tube railways, which caused less disruption because they were constructed by boring a tunnel, arrived in 1890, with the opening of the City and South London Railway, a 3.5-mile (5.6 km) line from Stockwell to King William Street. It was planned as a cable-hauled railway, but the advent of electric traction resulted in a simpler solution, and the change was made before the cable system was built. It became the world's first electric tube railway. Although the system includes 249 miles (401 km) of track, only about 45 percent is actually below ground.

Kingsway has an almost intact underground passageway for trams, which is occasionally open to the public.

Tunnels underneath the River Thames range from foot-tunnels to road tunnels and the tunnels of the Underground. The first of these, the Thames Tunnel, designed by Marc Isambard Brunel, was the first tunnel known to cross under a navigable river. It ran for 1,200 yards (1,100 m) from Rotherhithe to Wapping, and opened in 1843. It was used as a pedestrian subway, as the company did not have enough money or finance to build the intended access ramps for horse-drawn traffic. These tunnels were later used by the East London branch of the Metropolitan Railway from Shoreditch to New Cross. It was refurbished in 2011 and became part of the London Overground network.

Several railway stations have cavernous vaults and tunnels running beneath them, often disused, or reopened with a new purpose. Examples include The Old Vic Tunnels, beneath London Waterloo station, and the vaults beneath London Bridge station, formerly utilised by the theatre company Shunt.

== Defence ==
Many underground military citadels were built under London. Few are acknowledged, and even fewer are open to the public. One exception is the famous Cabinet War Rooms, used by Winston Churchill during the Second World War.

During the war, parts of the Underground were converted into air-raid shelters known as deep-level shelters. Some were converted for military and civil defence use, such as the now-disused Kingsway telephone exchange.

Other civil defence centres in London are wholly or partly underground, mostly remnants from the Cold War. Many other subterranean facilities exist around the centre of government in Whitehall, often linked by tunnels.

In December 1980, the New Statesman revealed the existence of secret tunnels linking government buildings, which they claimed would be used in the event of a national emergency. It is believed these tunnels also link to Buckingham Palace. Author Duncan Campbell discussed these facilities in more detail, in the book War Plan UK: The Truth about Civil Defence in Britain (1982). Peter Laurie wrote a book about these facilities, titled Beneath the City Streets: A Private Inquiry into the Nuclear Preoccupations of Government (1970).

== Utilities ==
London, like most other major cities, established an extensive underground infrastructure for electricity distribution, natural gas supply, water supply and telecommunications.

Starting in 1861, Victorian engineers built miles of purpose-built subways large enough to walk through, and through which they could run gas, electricity, water and hydraulic power pipes. These works removed the inconvenience of having to repeatedly excavate highways to allow access to underground utilities.

The London Hydraulic Power Company, set up in 1883, installed a hydraulic power network of high-pressure cast-iron water mains. These were bought by Mercury Communications for use as telecommunications ducts and are now part of the Vodafone network, but are not accessible to the public and generally too narrow for people to access.

== Abandoned structures ==
Some underground structures are no longer in use. These include:

- Sections of the London Pneumatic Despatch Company tunnels linking the General Post Office and Euston Railway station.
- An extensive private underground railway, the London Post Office Railway, was constructed by the Post Office, fell into disuse and has now become a tourist attraction.
- Closed London Underground stations are generally not accessible to the public except on London Transport Museum guided tours.

== See also ==
General topics:

- List of former and unopened London Underground stations
- Military citadels under London
- London deep-level shelters
- Tunnels underneath the River Thames
- London sewerage system
- Catacombs of London
- Subterranean rivers of London
- Neverwhere, a story set in a fantasy underground London

Individual sites of interest:

- Kingsway tramway subway
- Criterion Theatre
- Tower Subway
- King William Street tube station
- Holborn Viaduct Low Level Station
- Oxgate Admiralty Citadel
- Bishopsgate railway station
- Northern Outfall Sewer
- Southern Outfall Sewer
- Great Conduit
- London Post Office Railway

== Bibliography ==
- Emmerson, A. and Beard, T. (2004) London's Secret Tubes, Capital Transport Publishing, ISBN 1-85414-283-6.
- Trench, R. and Hillman, E. (1993) London Under London: A subterranean guide, second revised edition, London: John Murray, ISBN 0-7195-5288-5.
- Campbell, Duncan (1983) War Plan UK. Granada, UK. ISBN 0-586-08479-7 & ISBN 978-0-586-08479-3.
- Ackroyd, Peter (2011) London Under. Vintage Books, 202pp. ISBN 9780099287377
