= HMS St Vincent =

The Battle of Cape St. Vincent (1797) between a British Fleet and a larger Spanish fleet resulted in a British victory. John Jervis, the admiral in command of the British fleet became the 1st Earl of St Vincent. Four ships and three shore establishments of the Royal Navy have been named HMS St Vincent:

- HMS St Vincent (1692) was an 8-gun fireship captured from the French in 1692 and sold in 1698.
- HMS St Vincent (1780) was a 14-gun sloop, previously the Spanish ship San Vicente. She was captured in 1780 and was sold in 1783.
- HMS St Vincent (1815) was a 120-gun first-rate ship of the line launched in 1815, on harbour service from 1841, used as a training ship from 1862, and sold in 1906.
- HMS St Vincent (1908) was a St Vincent-class battleship launched in 1908 and sold in 1921.
- HMS St Vincent (Gosport shore establishment) was a boy/junior training establishment in Gosport from 1927 to 1969.
- HMS St. Vincent was the home of the Royal Navy section of the Royal Naval Reserve's London centre, HMS President between 1983 and 1992.
- HMS St Vincent (Whitehall shore establishment) was the Navy's communication centre in Whitehall from 1992 to 1998. It then became known as 'MARCOMM COMCEN (St Vincent)'.
