= Civil defence centres in London =

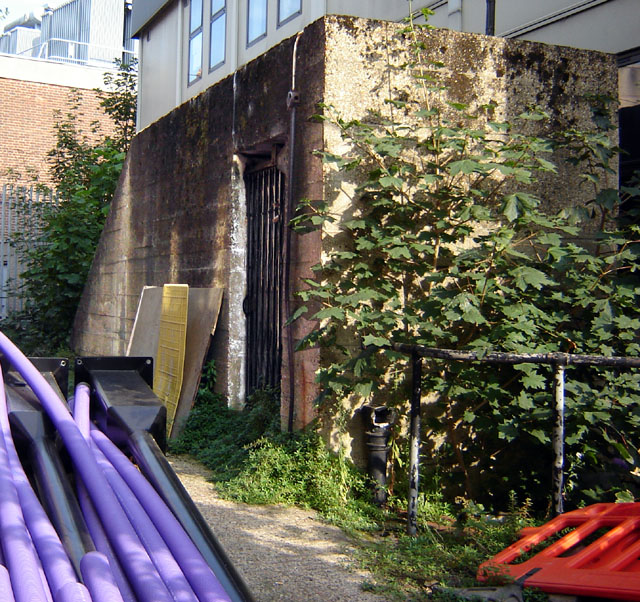
The entrance to the Civil Defence centre for Stoke Newington, behind the town hall. Now merely used for storage. (September 2005)

During the Cold War every London borough was obliged to have a Civil Defence centre. These were controversial structures as it was widely believed that planning for the aftermath of nuclear war was both expensive and pointless.

The area of London (extending outwards to the then boundary of the Metropolitan Police District and thus including some areas outside the modern Greater London) was designated Region 5 and had its regional seat of government in a re-used radar station at Kelvedon Hatch in Essex. Below this level it was split into five groups – North, North East, North West, South East and South West. Each group had a control centre. Below this each borough had one as well.

== List of civil defence centres in London ==
=== North Group ===
Not allocated

=== North East Group ===
Northumberland Avenue, Wanstead group control

=== North West Group ===
Beatrice Road, Southall group control

=== South East Group ===
Pear Tree House group control

=== South West Group ===
Church Hill Road, Cheam group control

== See also ==
- Military citadels under London
- Subterranean London
