= Pancras Square Library =

Coordinates: 51.533824°N 0.126410°W

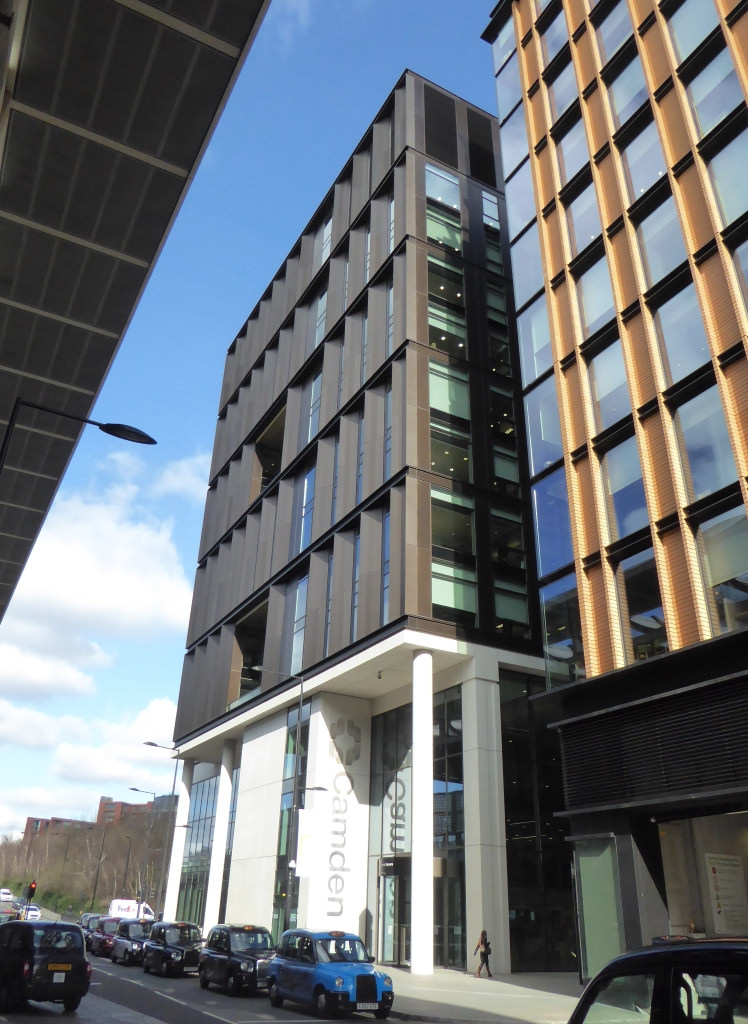
5 Pancras Square, home to several council services including Pancras Square Library

Pancras Square Library is in the London Borough of Camden located just off the Euston Road in the King's Cross area of the borough. It is situated on the ground floor of Camden Council's Town Hall complex. With a separate children's library it provides a wide selection of books, CDs and DVDs available to borrow, and free internet access, making it central to provide a library service and gateway to other Council services to the local community.

The library was originally located in the Euston Road, beside the British Library and St Pancras Chambers (formerly the Midland Grand Hotel), equidistant from King's Cross station and Euston station. It was opened by Princess Anne in April 1971 and was also home to the Shaw Theatre in honour of George Bernard Shaw who, in 1903, was elected as a St Pancras Councillor. There was a lending library on the ground floor and a separate children's library with its own entrance and a reference library on the second floor. The theatre is now part of the four star Novotel London St Pancras hotel.
