= David Moore (British photographer) =

British photographer (born 1961)

David Moore (born 1961) is a British photographer, artist and educator working in and around documentary photography. He has had solo exhibitions of his work at The Photographers' Gallery, London, Impressions Gallery, Bradford and at Wolverhampton Art Gallery. His work is held in the collection of the University of Warwick. He is Principal Lecturer for Documentary Photography and Photojournalism at the University of Westminster, London.

== Early life and education ==
Moore was born in Blackburn and within six weeks moved with his family to Derby, where he grew up.

He studied photography at West Surrey College of Art and Design in Farnham, graduating in 1988.

== Photography and theatre ==
David Chandler has pointed out that "Moore belonged to "the second wave of new colour documentary in Britain", having attended Farnham College of Art and Design, where he was taught by practitioners from the first wave including Martin Parr and Paul Graham."

The book Pictures From The Real World (2013) is a documentary series about working class families on a council estate in Derby in 1987/88. Moore made the colour work in Osmaston, near to where he was living, for his graduation show. Some of the pictures were chosen by Parr for a feature in Creative Camera in 1988. A tightly edited volume of the work was published by Dewi Lewis in 2013.

Moore has made a "portfolio of works on secret and relevant state infrastructure." He has documented Britain's Houses of Parliament, published in the book The Commons (2003). Between September 2006 and April 2007, he was given access to photograph the Ministry of Defence's Crisis Command Center, a military citadel under London. At the time he was the only known independent photographer to have done so. This resulted in the book The Last Things (2008), while an exhibition of the photographs, also named The Last Things, was staged at Belfast Exposed in 2008 and at Impressions Gallery in Bradford in 2009. He has also documented the top-security jail cells for terrorist suspects inside London's Paddington Green Police Station.

The Lisa and John Slideshow, a 45-minute play written and directed by Moore, traces the dialogue between two subjects of Pictures From The Real World "as they select and react to images from the project's archive." The play premiered at Derby's Format International Photography Festival in 2017 and played at the Regent Street Cinema, London and the Metropolitan Arts Centre, Belfast in 2018.

== Educator ==
As of 2023 he is Principal Lecturer for Documentary Photography and Photojournalism at the University of Westminster, London.

== Publications ==
=== Books of work by Moore ===
- The Velvet Arena. Velvet, 1994. ISBN 978-0952468608.
- The Commons. Velvet, 2003. ISBN 978-0952468615. With an essay by Philip Hoare.
- The Last Things. Stockport: Dewi Lewis, 2007. ISBN 978-1-904587-66-8. With essays by Chris Petit and Angela Weight.
- Pictures From The Real World: Colour Photographs from 1987–1988. Stockport: Dewi Lewis; London: Here, 2013. ISBN 978-1907893339. With an essay by David Chandler. Edition of 500 copies.
- The Lisa and John Slideshow: A Play About Photography. London: Makina, 2019. ISBN 978-1-9160608-1-4. With an essay by Val Williams ("Acting Out: David, Lisa and John"). Edition of 400 copies.

=== Zines ===
- English Domestic Interiors: 1986–88. Southport: Café Royal, 2021.

== Exhibitions ==
=== Solo exhibitions ===
- David Moore: The Velvet Arena, at The Photographers' Gallery, London, 1994/95
- The Last Things, Impressions Gallery, Bradford, 2009; Wolverhampton Art Gallery, Wolverhampton, 2009

=== Group exhibitions ===
- Home Sweet Home, Rencontres d'Arles, Arles, France, 2019

== Films ==
- Monitor (2005)

== Collections ==
Moore's work is held in the following permanent collection:

- University of Warwick, Coventry: "from 'Pocket Fiction' which explored the personal histories of a group of individuals living in Lincolnshire 1996"
