= Pear Tree House =

London block of flats with a nuclear bunker

Coordinates: 51.4205°N 0.0865°W

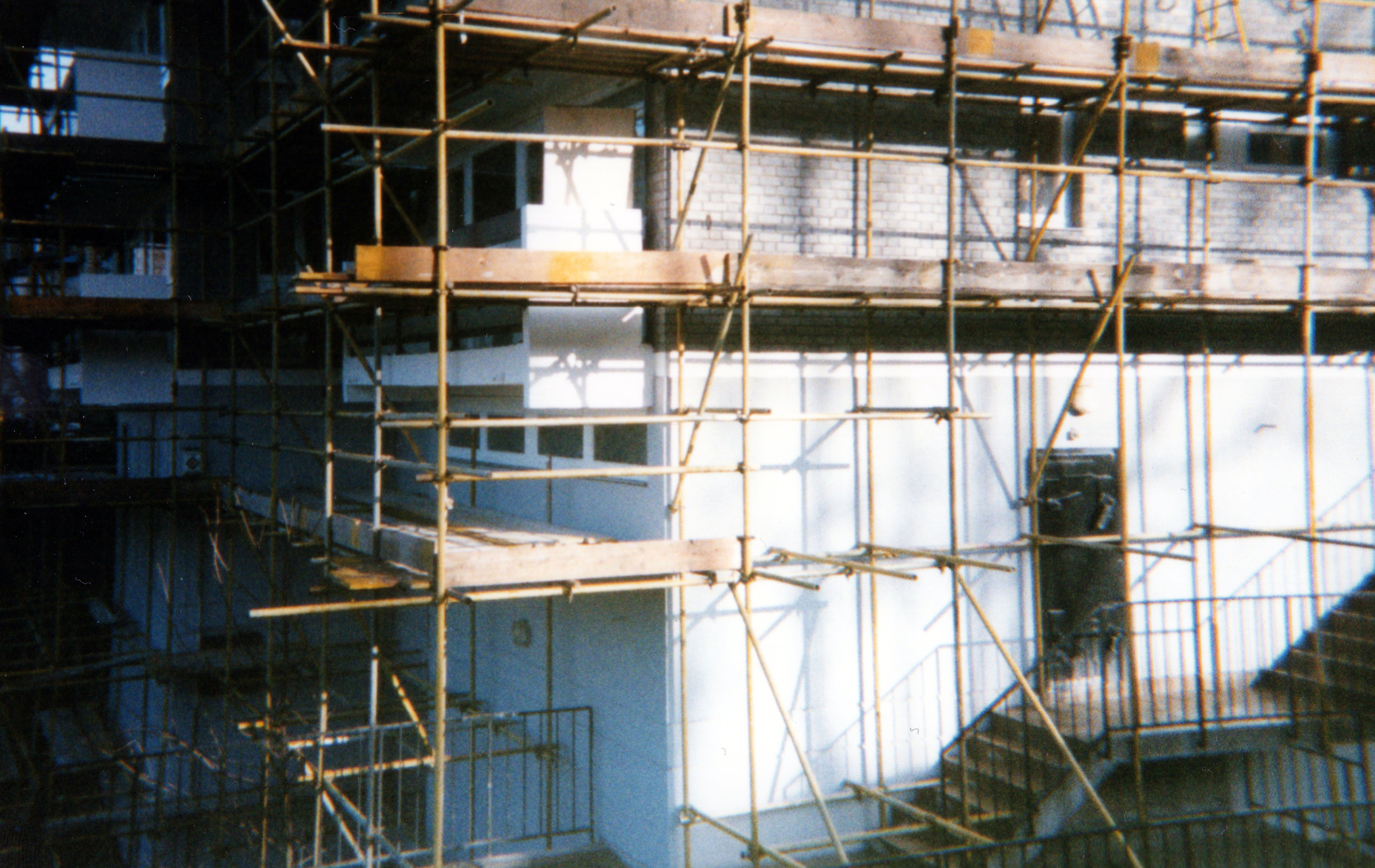
The side of Pear Tree House

Pear Tree House was the former Civil Defence control centre for South-East London. It is a block of council flats in the Central Hill Estate of Upper Norwood with eight two-bedroom flats and the control centre in the basement.

== History ==
In the early 1960s the Metropolitan Borough of Lambeth was grouped with the neighbouring boroughs of Southwark and Camberwell to make up civil defence region 53a. Negotiations took place between them for a site to build a control centre for the area during the heightened atmosphere in the era of the Cuban Missile Crisis. A large area of Gipsy Hill in Lambeth was designated for a new housing estate and, as it was in the extreme south of the borough and well protected by the local hills, a site at the junction of Lunham Road and Hawke Road in SE19 was chosen.

Whilst the two-storey bunker was being designed and approved the structures of civil defence and London government were changing. Work on Pear Tree House started in 1963, but it was now merely going to be a borough control centre; the existing borough control in St Matthews Road, Brixton was to become a sub-control. It cost £31,850 of which the Home Office paid 75% (£23,250). The 18-room bunker and flats were completed in 1966 and the bunker went into care and maintenance when civil defence was stood down two years later.

In 1971 London was designated a civil defence region again and in 1973 the GLC set up emergency planning teams looking at the future structures of civil defence in the capital. It was decided that London would be split into five groups of boroughs each having its own control centre. The GLC selected the Pear Tree House bunker as the South East group war HQ and although not ideal it was converted in 1979.

Because of its location Pear Tree House received a lot of attention in the 1980s. It was a focus of local CND marches, its blast doors were fly posted and it was open to the public for a week in 1982 for CND's Hard Luck campaign which coincided with the dates of the cancelled Hard Rock exercise. Speakers during that week included Duncan Campbell and Bruce Kent.

In the late 1980s the arrangement to rent the bunker from Lambeth expired and 'nuclear-free' Lambeth threatened the London Fire and Civil Defence Authority with eviction. Another site was looked for but an agreement was made and it remained the South East group emergency centre until 1993. It was later used as a social services store and is now empty.
