= Military citadels under London =

A number of military citadels are known to have been constructed underground in central London, dating mostly from the Second World War and the Cold War. Unlike traditional above-ground citadels, these sites are primarily secure centres for defence coordination.

A large network of tunnels exists below London for a variety of communications, civil defence and military purposes; however, it is unclear how these tunnels, and the various facilities linked to them, fit together, if at all. Even the number and nature of these facilities is unclear; only a few have been officially admitted to.

== Ministry of Defence citadels ==
The Ministry of Defence (MOD) Main Building in Whitehall was outfitted with two bunkers, known as the North and South Citadels, when first built. The site of the South Citadel was later used for an improved "Defence Crisis Management Centre" bunker. The bunker is named after the ancient Greek poet Pindar whose house was the only one left standing in Thebes following the city's destruction in 335 BC.

Planning for the Pindar bunker began in 1979, with ministerial approval being granted in November 1982 and construction starting in 1984. Originally due to become operational in 1989 or 1990, the bunker instead became operational in December 1992. The bunker cost £126.3 million, £66.3 million of which was spent on the civil engineering element; computer equipment was much more expensive to install than originally estimated as there was very little physical access to what was a confined site.

Pindar has two floors; the lower floor contains the Ministry of Defence's Joint Operations Centre (previously situated on the fifth floor of the MOD Main Building), and the upper floor consists of Government Emergency Rooms (comprising the Prime Minister, Secretaries of State, the Cabinet Secretary, and some Permanent Secretaries), an element of the Joint Intelligence Organisation, and a telecommunications secretariat and a Cabinet Office Communications Centre (COMCEN) element. Onsite facilities include stores for items ranging from CBRN equipment to personal hygiene products, a television studio and broadcast centre, a decontamination suite, briefing and conference rooms, a "crisis control room", and a medical bay. Pindar can house "an absolute maximum" of four hundred personnel and provides protection against the blast, radiation, and electromagnetic pulse effects of "all but a direct hit or very near miss" by nuclear weapons; it further provides protection against conventional bombing, sabotage, biological and chemical attack, and flooding, though a 1987 assessment determined that it could potentially be overwhelmed by newer precision-guided munitions. The bunker was intended to be capable of thirty days' independent operation, seven of which could be spent in a sealed condition in case of persistent chemicals or nuclear fallout.

Pindar is connected to Downing Street and the Cabinet Office by a tunnel under Whitehall; the tunnel predated the bunker and was already used as a conduit between the Cabinet Office and the MOD Main Building, with Downing Street access being added during Pindar's construction. The tunnel can be used by government ministers to enter Pindar without risking the press attention (and subsequent damage to national morale) that would ensue if the bunker was openly entered and, as was the case when the bunker was used for meetings on the 1999 NATO bombing campaign in Yugoslavia, without the risk of encountering hostile demonstrations. When answering written questions about Pindar, which included a question on the extent of lift and staircase access to the bunker and on whether there was any connection to transport systems, then-Armed Forces Minister Jeremy Hanley would say only that there were "sufficient means of access and egress" and denied that the bunker was connected to any transport system; he also said that there were means of leaving Pindar should the MOD Main Building collapse on top of it, but did not state the details of these.

Although Pindar is a restricted site, the bunker's interior has had some public exposure. Between September 2006 and April 2007, the British photographer David Moore carried out an extensive photographic survey of an underground facility that was widely believed (and strongly hinted) to be Pindar, with both Moore and the Ministry of Defence stating in later years that Pindar was indeed the facility depicted in the photographs. The photographs were published as The Last Things in 2008 as well as being exhibited in 2008 and 2009.

In addition to the bunker under the Main Building, it was intended that a reserve location be established at the site of the Kingsway telephone exchange in High Holborn; while a bunker was indeed established in the eastmost tunnels it is unclear whether this was connected to Pindar, and in any case it was abandoned in 1996. A further change in intentions relates to the "COBR" Cabinet Office Briefing Rooms; while it was intended that Pindar would replace these, the idea appears to have been abandoned and the briefing rooms remain in use to this day.

== Admiralty Citadel ==
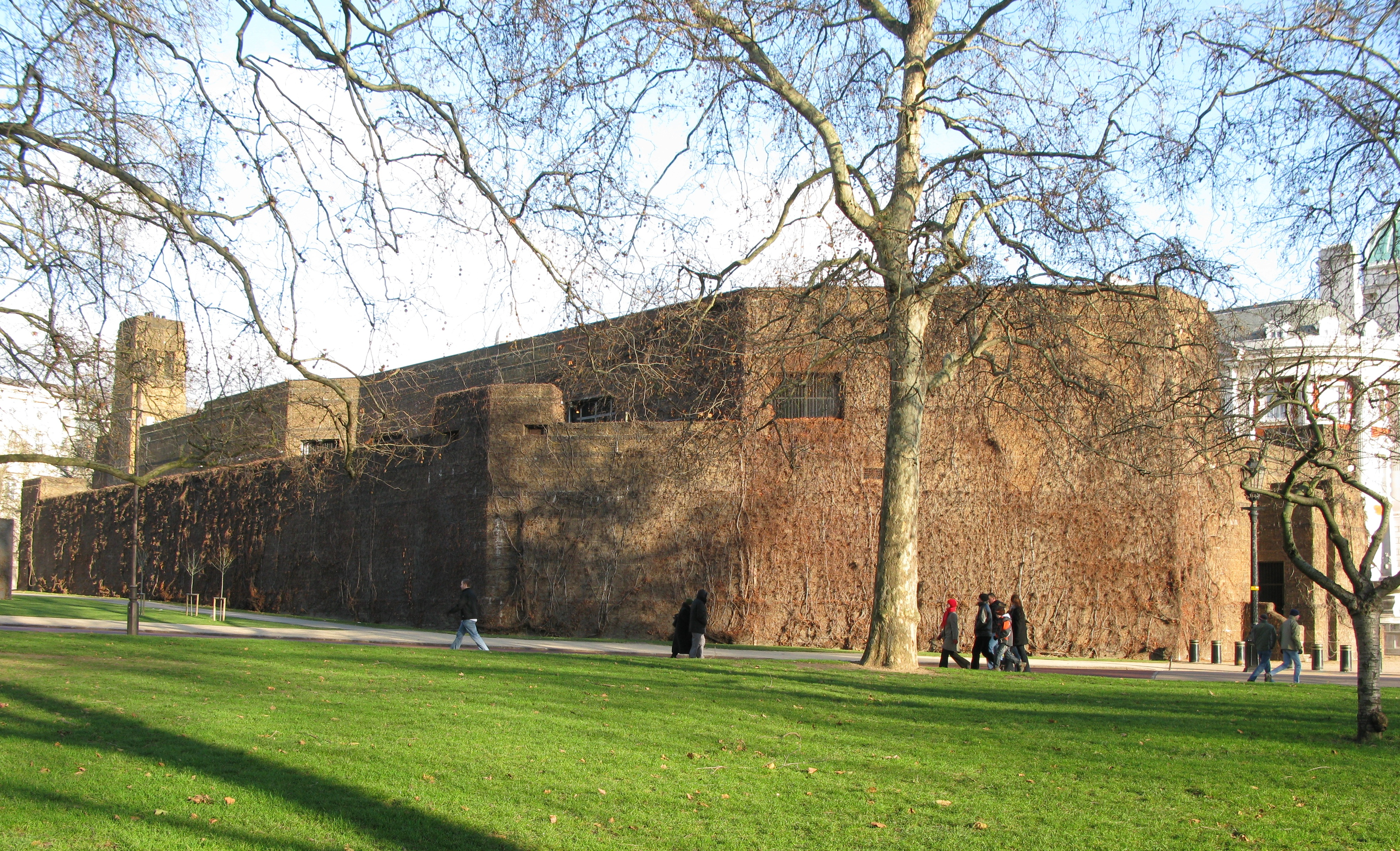
The Admiralty Citadel in 2008

The Admiralty Citadel, London's most visible military citadel, is located just behind Admiralty House on Horse Guards Parade. It was constructed in 1939 by the Ministry of Works, with the architect W. A. Forsyth as a consultant. It was designed as a bomb-proof operations centre for the Admiralty, with foundations 30 ft (9 m) deep and a 20-foot (6 m) thick concrete roof. It is also linked by tunnels to government buildings in Whitehall.

Its brutal functionality speaks of a very practical purpose; in the event of a German invasion, it was intended that the building would become a fortress, with loopholed firing positions provided to fend off attackers. Sir Winston Churchill described it in his memoirs as a "vast monstrosity which weighs upon the Horse Guards Parade". In 1955, a question was asked in the House of Commons about mitigating its harsh appearance. The Minister of Works, Nigel Birch, describing it as "a hideous building", announced that the heavy gun positions were to be removed and that planting Virginia creeper (some sources identify the plants as Boston ivy) would help to mask the concrete walls. In the same debate, a suggestion by John Tilney MP that a variety of plants be used was rejected by the minister on the grounds that it would "make it like an old-world tea garden". It became a Grade II listed building in December 1987.

In 1992 the Admiralty communications centre was established here as the stone frigate HMS St Vincent, which became MARCOMM COMCEN (St Vincent) in 1998. The Admiralty Citadel is still used today by the Ministry of Defence.

== Cabinet War Rooms ==
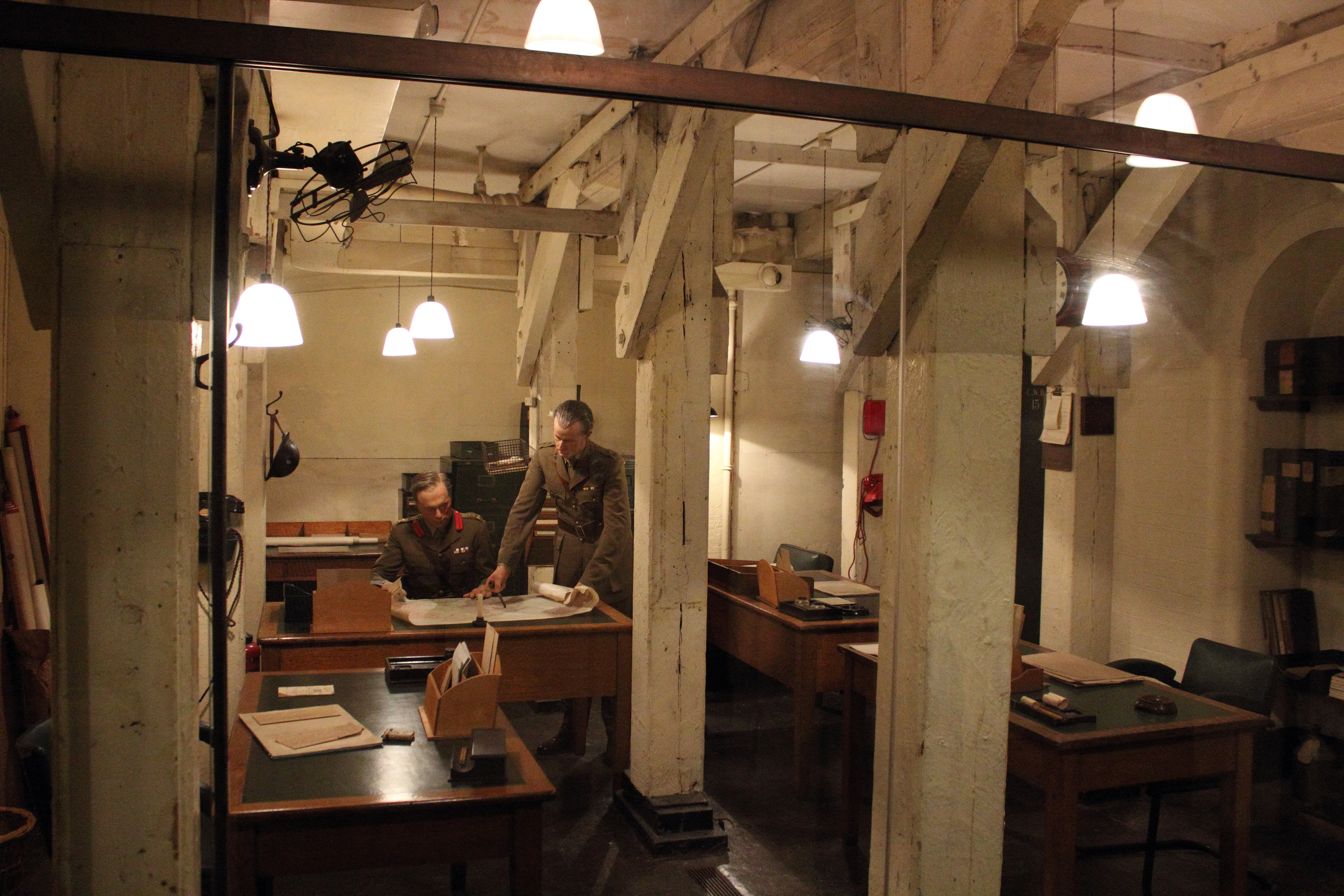
Interior of the Cabinet War Rooms

The only central London citadel currently open to the public is the Cabinet War Rooms, located in Horse Guards Road in the basement of what is now HM Treasury. This was not a purpose-built citadel but was instead a reinforced adaptation of an existing basement built many years before.

The War Rooms were constructed in 1938 and were regularly used by Winston Churchill during World War II. However, the Cabinet War Rooms were vulnerable to a direct hit and were abandoned not long after the war. The Cabinet War Rooms were a secret to all civilians until their opening to the public in 1984. They are now a popular tourist attraction maintained by the Imperial War Museum.

The section of the War Rooms open to the public is in fact only a portion of a much larger facility. This originally covered three acres (1.2 hectares) and housed a staff of up to 528, with facilities including a canteen, a hospital, a shooting range and dormitories. The centrepiece of the War Rooms is the Cabinet Room itself, where Churchill's War Cabinet met.

The Map Room is adjacent; from here the course of the war was directed. It is still in much the same condition as when it was abandoned, with the original maps still on the walls, and telephones and other original artefacts on the desks. Churchill slept in a small bedroom nearby. There is a small telephone room (disguised as a toilet) down the corridor that provided a direct line to the White House in Washington DC, via a special scrambler in an annexe basement of Selfridges department store in Oxford Street.

A standby facility known as "Paddock" was also built, but was only used for two War Cabinet meetings, and then only on an exercise basis, and was abandoned in 1944.

== Q-Whitehall and tunnel network ==
Q-Whitehall is the name given to a communications facility under Whitehall.

The facility was built in a 12 ft (3.7 m) diameter tunnel during World War II, and extends under Whitehall. The project was known as 'Post Office scheme 2845'. A detailed description, with photographs, was published just after the war in the January 1946 edition of The Post Office Electrical Engineers' Journal.

Sites equipped with unusual amounts of GPO/BT telecommunications plant are given what is now called a BT site engineering code. This site's code was L/QWHI.

The site provided protected accommodation for the lines and terminal equipment serving the most important government departments, civil and military, to ensure that the command and control of the war could continue despite heavy bombing of London.

At the northern end, a tunnel connects to a shaft up to the former Trafalgar Square tube station (now merged with Charing Cross station), and to the BT (as it is called now) deep level cable tunnels which were built under much of London during the Cold War. At the southern end, an 8 ft (2.4 m) diameter extension (Scheme 2845A) connects to a shaft under Court 6 of the Treasury Building: this provided the protected route from the Cabinet War Room. This was known as Y-Whitehall. The tunnel was further extended (Scheme 2845B) to the Marsham Street Rotundas. This extension housed the 'Federal' telephone exchange which had a dialling code of 333 from the public network. In the 1980s it housed Horseferry Tandem, which provided a unified communications system for all government departments as well as the Palace of Westminster.

Access to the tunnel is gained via a lateral tunnel of the same diameter, and by a lift shaft in the nearby Whitehall telephone exchange in Craig's Court. A further entrance is via the deep level portion of the Admiralty.

Spur tunnels, 5 ft (1.5 m) in diameter, were built to provide protected cable routes to the major service buildings either side of Whitehall.

The Whitehall tunnels appear to have been extended in the early 1950s. Some official documents refer to a Scheme 3245: this is the only numbered tunnel scheme that has never been officially revealed or located by researchers. Files in the National Archives which may relate to this have been closed for 75 years and will not be opened until the 2020s.

The journalist Duncan Campbell managed to get into the tunnel network, and described his exploration in the 19–26 December 1980 issue of the New Statesman. He found more than thirty access shafts for the network as well as entrances to Q-Whitehall (below Trafalgar Square), various government department buildings (including Downing Street, the Cabinet Office, the Ministry of Defence, the Old War Office, the Admiralty, the Treasury, and the Department of the Environment), the old Cabinet War Rooms, and various telephone exchanges. He created a map of both this network and the deep level cable network, based on his investigation. Campbell did not find the network to be particularly secure: many of the access shafts could be easily found and entered by unauthorised individuals such as himself, (Note: Among other examples mentioned in his article, Campbell described being directed to a manhole cover situated between Bethnal Green Road and Sclater Street which he would then use for his various visits to the tunnel network.) and while patrolmen were present throughout the tunnels they were more concerned with checking structural integrity than stopping intruders. The more readily accessible of the shafts were promptly sealed up after Campbell's article was published.

== See also ==
- Fortifications of London
- Central Government War Headquarters
- Subterranean London
- Civil defence centres in London
- Kingsway telephone exchange
