= Catacombs of London =

Historic site

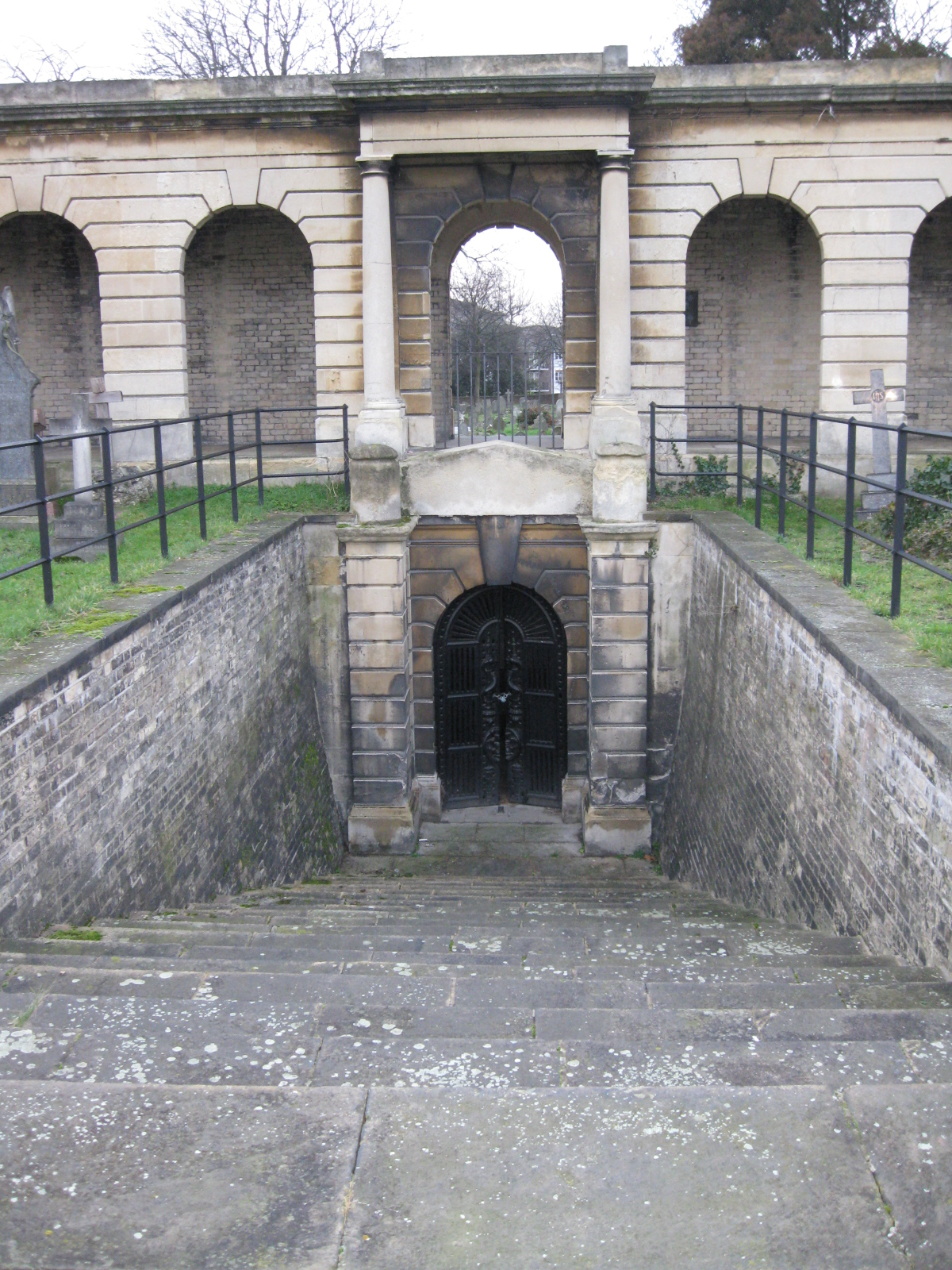
Catacomb entrance at Brompton Cemetery

The city of London, England, has several catacomb spaces, although the high water table limits subterranean construction. There has been a long tradition of burial under the floors of churches, and during the period of new church construction in the Victorian era many were provided with vaults or crypts under the main structure.

In London's private Magnificent Seven cemeteries, opened between 1833 and 1841, there are several purpose-built catacombs, including those of West Norwood Cemetery, which has a collection of historic monuments on a landscaped hill. Its catacombs, opened in 1837, were built below chapels and included a group of 95 vaults with private and shared loculi with a capacity of 3,500 coffins.

Kensal Green and Brompton cemeteries have extensive catacombs built underground, whilst Nunhead Cemetery also has a smaller one underground. Highgate Cemetery is unique in that its "Terrace Catacombs" are built into the slope of a hill and accessed at ground level. Situated at the summit of the Cemetery, it houses 825 loculi under a long observation terrace on which asphalt was laid, one of the first examples of its use for this purpose in England.

The Camden catacombs are an extensive range of passages largely underneath what later became the Camden markets, constructed in the 19th century, which were originally used as stables for horses and pit ponies working on the railways. The catacombs also included an underground pool for canal boats.

The Clerkenwell Catacombs are a complex of tunnels originally situated beneath the Clerkenwell House of Detention, and once contained 286 prison cells. The prison is long gone, replaced by the Hugh Myddelton School, but the catacombs remain. Although the space was once open to the public as a minor tourist attraction, it is now only accessible to film crews and the occasional private event.

== See also ==
- Catacombs
- Subterranean London
