= HMS St Vincent (Whitehall shore establishment) =

Coordinates: 51°30′21″N 0°7′46″W

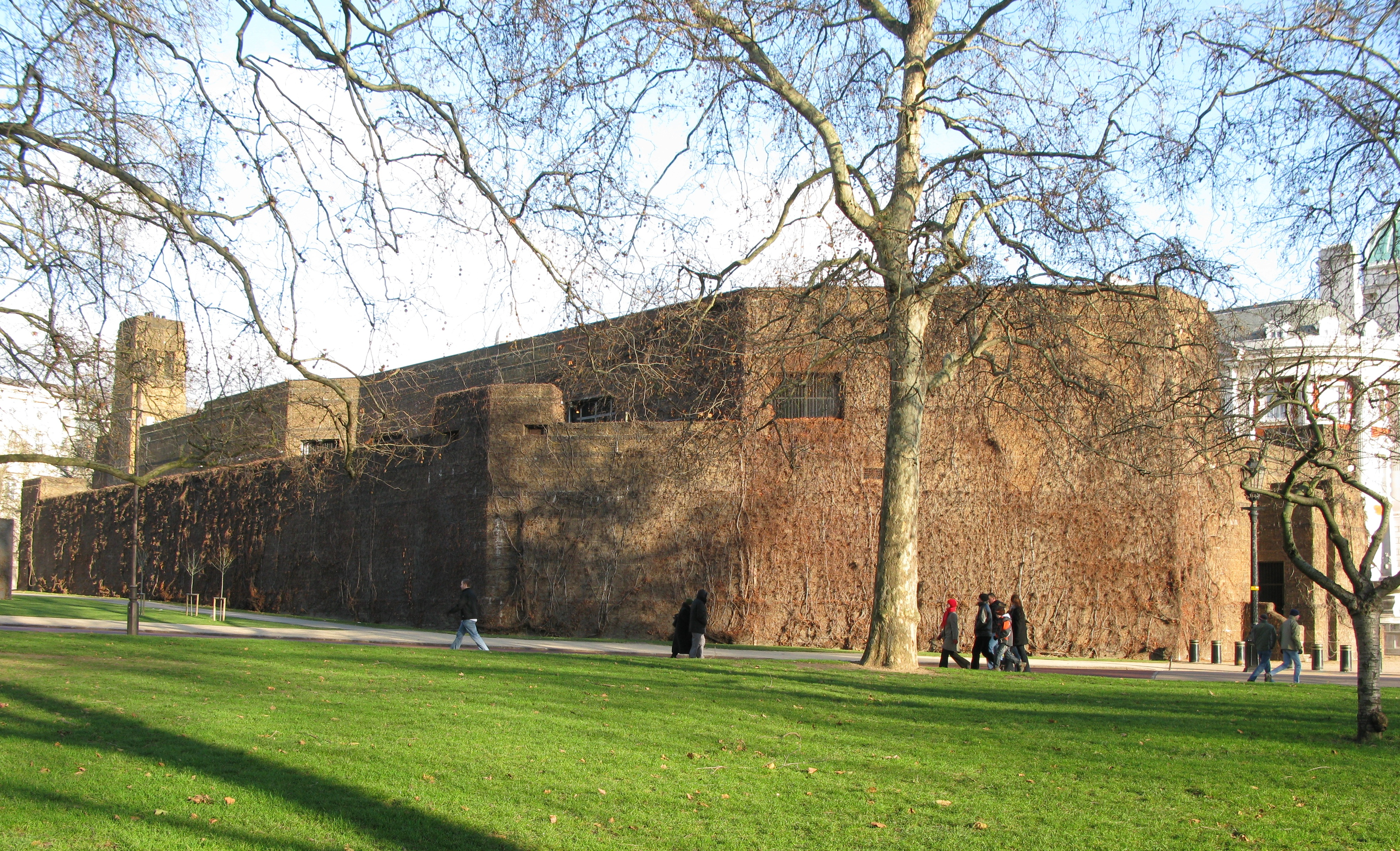
- The Admiralty Citadel in 2008, former home of HMS St Vincent

History

United Kingdom
- Name: HMS St Vincent
- Commissioned: 1 April 1992
- Decommissioned: 31 March 1998
- Fate: Elements merged into new organisation

General characteristics
- Class & type: Stone frigate

HMS St Vincent was a shore establishment of the Royal Navy, located in London during the 1990s.

There had been a previous London-based HMS St Vincent, which had been the home of the Royal Navy section at the Royal Naval Reserve's base at HMS President. This HMS St Vincent had closed on 31 March 1992, and the following day, on 1 April 1992 a new HMS St Vincent opened. This was located in the Admiralty Citadel, a Grade II listed concrete blockhouse built in 1939, behind Admiralty House and became the Admiralty's communication centre. It continued to operate until being paid off on 31 March 1998. Its elements then became MARCOMM COMCEN (St Vincent).
