= Oxgate Admiralty Citadel =

Alternate U.K. naval command bunker, 1939-1944

Coordinates: 51.5681°N 0.2297°W

Oxgate Admiralty Citadel is the name given to a military bunker constructed between 1937 and 1940, for the Admiralty, on the corner of Edgware Road and Oxgate Lane, in north London.

The citadel was designed to be an away-from-Whitehall base for Admiralty operations, useful in the event of a need to evacuate the centre of London. The location was a mile from the Paddock, an alternate Cabinet War Room bunker for Winston Churchill's World War II government.

The citadel comprises a three-storey building above ground (typical of government building vernacular), with an upper basement and a specially protected lower basement. It was used between 1939 and 1944, thereafter being given over to the Health & Safety Executive; nowadays it is in private hands.
