= Camden Catacombs =

System of underground passages in London

Coordinates: 51°32′30″N 0°08′46″W

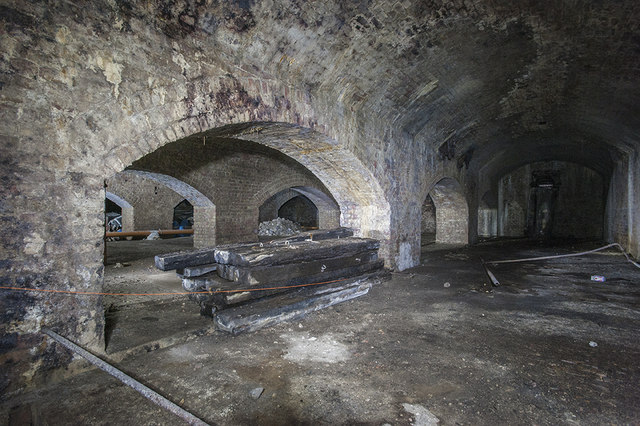
Part of Camden Catacombs in April 2010

The Camden Catacombs are a system of underground passages in Camden Town in north London underneath part of the Camden markets, constructed in the 19th century, and as of 2012 owned by Network Rail. They are not true catacombs as they were never used as repositories for dead bodies, instead being an underground area originally used as stables for horses and pit ponies working on the railways.

The catacombs also included an underground pool for canal boats operating on the nearby Regent's Canal. They are not open to visitors owing to danger of flooding.

== See also ==
- Catacombs of London
