= Beneath the City Streets =

1970 book by Peter Laurie

Beneath the City Streets: A Private Inquiry into the Nuclear Preoccupations of Government
- Author: Peter Laurie
- Language: English
- Subject: Civil Defence
- Genre: Non-Fiction
- Publisher: Allen Lane
- Publication date: 1970
- Publication place: United Kingdom
- Media type: Book
- Pages: 247
- ISBN: 0-7139-0114-4
- OCLC: 222366
- Dewey Decimal: 363.350941
- LC Class: UA929.G7 L34

Beneath the City Streets: A Private Inquiry into the Nuclear Preoccupations of Government is a 1970 book by British author Peter Laurie. It details the existence and necessity of underground bunkers, food depots, and government safe havens throughout underground London and the UK from 1914 to 1970.

The book consists of linked articles on aspects of nuclear war and UK civil defence:

1. War Comes to the British Homeland
2. What the Bomb Does to People, Houses and Other Things
3. Accuracy of Rockets and Nuclear Effect Against Military Targets
4. Two Kinds of Nuclear War, and Their Drawbacks
5. MIRV, ABM and the Arms Race. Hardware in Space and Under the Sea
6. Chemical and Biological Weapons
7. British Civil Defence and the H-Bomb
8. Recovery from a Nuclear War
9. Government Citadels in Britain
10. The Impact of Latent Nuclear War on Democracy
