= Civil Defence centre =

Civil Defence centres are administration, communication and logistics command centres built in the United Kingdom by the British Government for use in the event of war or serious emergency. During World War II they were often called Air Raid Precautions (ARP) centres. During the Cold War they were also called controls or emergency centres, or popularly nuclear bunkers.

They should not be confused with air raid shelters or fallout shelters.

== See also ==
- Civil defence centres in London
