= Age NI =

Northern Irish older adult nonprofit

- Company type: Charity
- Founded: April 2009
- Headquarters: Northern Ireland
- Key people: Linda Robinson
- Website: www.ageni.org

Age NI is a registered charity in Northern Ireland, formed in April 2009, which combines the operations of the previously separate charities Age Concern NI and Help the Aged in Northern Ireland to form Northern Ireland's largest charity for older people. The charity operated under its original charity names as "Age Concern NI and Help the Aged in Northern Ireland" until the new brand launched on 26 March 2010. It also works interdependently with charities for the nations called Age Cymru, Age Scotland and Age UK.

== Structure ==
Age NI was formed from the merger of Age Concern NI and Help the Aged in Northern Ireland, creating an organisation with a combined income of around £5 million, raised through corporate partnerships, fundraising, public funding and charity shops.

Anne O'Reilly, previously Deputy Chief Commissioner of the Equality Commission, was appointed Chief Executive of the new charity in April 2009. Her previous experience includes ten years as the Director of Help the Aged in Northern Ireland, Chair of NICVA for six years, Chair of Engage with Age (an interagency community development partnership) and Director of Women's Resource and Development Agency.

Age NI adopts shared governance as part of its organisational culture. This is to ensure those primarily affected by the decisions of the organisation are given the opportunity to be involved in the decision making process.

== History ==
=== Age Concern ===
Age Concern's origins are British and can be traced back to a realisation in that country of the effects on aged people of the Second World War; the dislocation and breakdown of family life arising out of conscription led to a recognition that existing poor laws failed to provide effective support for old people separated from family support networks.

In 1940, the Old People's Welfare Committee (OPWC), chaired by Eleanor Rathbone, was formed as a forum for discussion between government and voluntary organisations. OPWC was a sub-committee of Liverpool Personal Service Society (PSS). In 1944, the committee changed its name to the National Old People's Welfare Committee (NOPWC), and took on responsibility for coordinating the activities of numerous local OPWCs.

From the 1950s onwards, NOPWC accessed government and local funds associated with the post-war development of the welfare state, to provide services to local committees, and training to wardens of old people's homes.

In 1971, under the direction of David Hobman, the NOPWC changed its public name to Age Concern, and separated itself entirely from government and the National Council for Social Service, now NCVO. It did so while also launching a 'manifesto for old age' and establishing itself nationally as a lobbying body as well as an organisation that engaged in service provision and enhancement, training and research.

The directors of Age Concern England have included David Hobman, Baroness Greengross, and Gordon Lishman - the current Director General.

In 1986 Age Concern established an Institute of Gerontology at King's College London into which it folded its own Age Concern Research Unit.

=== Help the Aged ===
Help the Aged was founded in 1961 by Cecil Jackson-Cole, with the aim to free disadvantaged older people from poverty, isolation and neglect.

== Branding ==
The two brand logos from the merged charities will gradually disappear now that the new Age NI brand has been launched (on 26 March 2010) and new brand-awareness develops during 2010.

Anne O'Reilly, the charity's Chief Executive, stated "By 2029, the number of over 60s here will increase to 600,000. Ageing is a global phenomenon. Age needs a voice in Northern Ireland and now it has one - Age NI."
