= Elder rights =

Rights of older adults

Elder rights are the rights of older adults (usually those in the seventh decade of life or older, although this definition is disputed), who in various countries are not recognized as a constitutionally protected class, yet face discrimination across many aspects of society due to their age.

Common rights issues faced by elders include age-related job discrimination (such as forced age of retirement), lack of access to medical treatments, because of age or age-related obstacles, societal perceptions of ability/disability due to age, and vulnerability to abuse, including financial, physical, psychological, social, and sexual abuse, because of diminished capacity and lack of access to/ability to use technology.

One of the earliest efforts by the US federal government to protect financial rights of elders was the establishment of Social Security benefits via the Social Security Act in 1935, providing income to retired individuals who qualify.

== Defining elder rights ==
In 1991, the UNHRC General Assembly established principles to guide and encourage the development of government programs that will protect older persons’ rights by ensuring the independence, participation, care, self-fulfillment and dignity of older people.

=== Aging and ageism ===
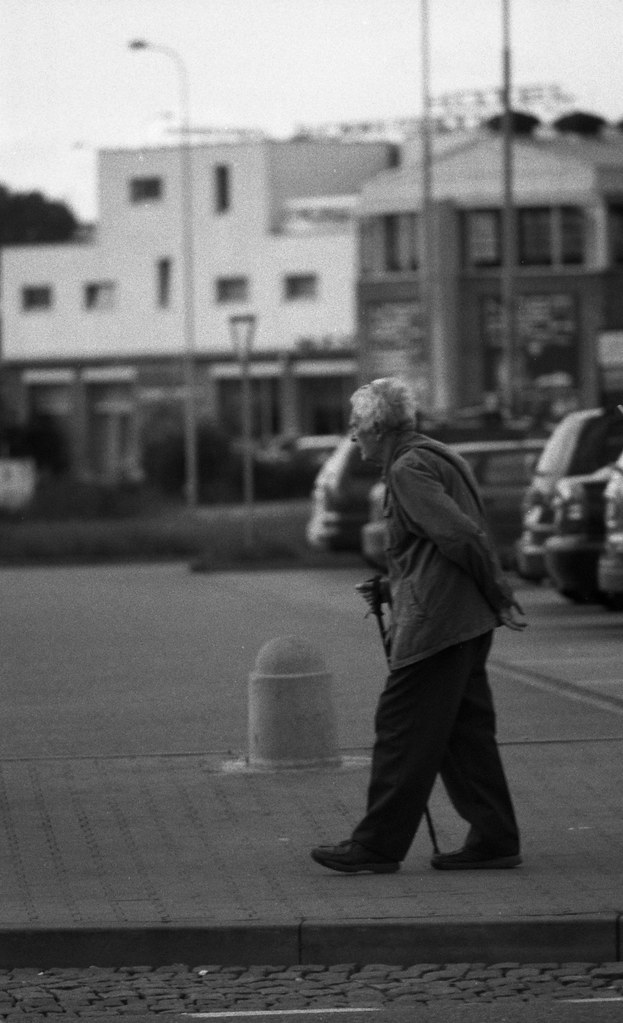
Elderly Man in front of Tesco Mall

Upholding and protecting the rights of older adults is vital to addressing problems related to ageing and ageism. With the rapid growth of population of older people globally, there has been international efforts to focus on issues associated with ageing and protection of the elderly in the past decade. As a result, ageism is recognized and studied as a global issue, an example of which is a survey of tens of thousands of people in more than 50 countries that revealed the majority of the participants as having moderate to high ageist attitudes. Identifying and combating the widespread prevalence of ageism is essential to promoting population health based on the growing evidence of harmful impacts of ageism on the health of older people.

== Elder rights movement ==
As defined by Nina Kohn, an elder rights movement is the "collective effort [of] organizations and individuals... (coming) together around the common goal of transforming social, political, and legal structures to allow older adults to fully exercise their civil and human rights and liberties." The concept of a unique set of needs and rights of the elderly started in 1930s, during the Great Depression, with the main focus being on the need for a national pension program to provide financial security to the no longer working elderly. Numerous rival plans (the Townsend Plan, the McClain Movement, the Ham and Eggs Movement) were made to address the issue. Eventually, as part of Franklin Delano Roosevelt's New Deal, the Social Security Act was passed to meet the need.

As the population aged and the aged grew wealthier throughout the second half of the twentieth century, their political influence increased. Organizations such as the American Association of Retired Persons and government bodies such as the Administration on Aging were created to meet their needs. Issues far beyond simple financial security became the focus – Maggie Kuhn, angered over her mandatory retirement at 65, launched the Gray Panthers in 1970. Since its establishment, the Gray Panthers have advocated for affordable, intergenerational housing and a single-payer healthcare system. Today, the Grey Panthers leads the Stakeholder Group on Aging, an organization it co-founded, which aims to create an international network of older persons and activists. The National Elder Law Foundation was created out of concern that the elderly might have unique legal needs. The 2006 reauthorization of the Older Americans Act included a project called Choices for Independence, to develop consumer-directed community-based (as opposed to congregate segregated choices such as traditional nursing homes) long-term care options.

== Social and financial rights of elders ==
The Adult Protective Services provide services for older individuals, who have been abused, neglected or exploited. Recently, there has been efforts to research and address elder abuse issues through passage of laws such as Elder Abuse Prevention and Prosecution Act of 2017.

One of the earliest efforts by the US federal government to protect financial rights of elders was the establishment of Social Security benefits via the Social Security Act in 1935, providing income to retired individuals who qualify. The law was amended in 1972 to add Supplemental Security Income, which provides cash assistance to individuals, 65 years of age or older. The passage of The Age Discrimination in Employment Act of 1967 further protected the financial rights of older people by prohibiting employers from discriminating against people who are 40 years of age or older.

== Health, healthcare, and medico-legal rights of older adults ==
One area where older adults experience particular vulnerability, is in healthcare and health decision-making. Worsening chronic illnesses, cognitive impairment, and limitations in functional status are all examples of changes that occur later in life, that can increase an older adult's level of dependency on a caregiver. This dependency leaves elderly people at a greater risk of experiencing abuse. According to the National Institute on Aging, elder abuse can occur when older adults are living away from home in a skilled nursing facility or assisted living facility, or even when they are living with family. While abuse can occur to anyone, older adults with impaired cognitive function due to dementia or with great medical need, are especially vulnerable. Signs of abuse include a disheveled appearance, unexplained bruises or scars, unexplained weight loss, recurrent bed sores, and lacking in supportive medical devices like glasses or hearing aides.

While elder abuse continues to be an ongoing problem, there are some protections in place for older adults. One of such protection is the Long-Term Care Ombudsman Program, which advocates for the rights of adults in nursing homes, assisted living facilities, and other residential settings. Despite such programs, there is still much progress to be made in defending the rights of elder adults.

The COVID-19 pandemic exposed previously ignored vulnerabilities in nursing homes, particularly their risk of exposing elder adults to avoidable injury and illness. According to a 2021 report by the Human Rights Watch, over 178,000 COVID-19 deaths were linked to nursing facilities comprising up to 40 percent of total deaths in the United States. These deaths have been attributed to long-standing staffing shortages and resident neglect.

== Milestones in elder rights development ==
| Year | Event | |
|---|---|---|
| 1920 | Civil Service Retirement Act (US) | Retirement system for government employees |
| 1935 | Social Security Act (US) | Old Age Assistance/Old Age Survivors Insurance |
| 1958 | American Association of Retired Persons founded | |
| 1965 | Older Americans Act (US) | Established the Administration on Aging |
| 1970 | Gray Panthers founded | |
| 1970 | Age Concern England launched | |
| 1974 | Age UK created | |
| 1994 | National Elder Law Foundation founded (US) | Certifies attorneys for elder law practice |
| 1999 | International Year of Older Persons | |
| 2002 | MIPAA - Madrid International Plan of Action on Aging | The global policy document regarding aging |
| 2003 | Medicare Prescription Drug, Improvement, and Modernization Act (US) | |
| 2003 | Scottish Senior Citizens Unity Party formed | |
| 2010 | Affordable Care Act (US) | |
| 2011 | UN Open Ended Working Group on Aging (OEWG) | The UN forum discussing elder rights |

== Notable elder rights activists ==
- Ethel Percy Andrus – founder of AARP
- David Hobman – creator of Age Concern England
- Maggie Kuhn – founder of the Gray Panthers
- Paul Kuniholm – elder rights artist
- Gordon Lishman – creator of Age UK
- Helen Levitov Sobell
- John Swinburne – founder of the Scottish Senior Citizens Unity Party
- Valerie Taylor
- Francis Townsend – creator of the Townsend Plan

== Specific jurisdictions ==
- Elder law in India
- Elder law (United States)
  - Elder law (Massachusetts)

== See also ==
- Activist ageing
- Age Concern, banner title used by a number of NGOs around the world
- Elder abuse
- Intergenerational equity
- Nursing home residents' rights
