= Greengross =

Greengross is a surname. Notable people with the surname include:

- Alan Greengross (1925–2018), British politician
- Sally Greengross, Baroness Greengross (born 1935), British politician
- Wendy Greengross (1925–2012), British general practitioner and broadcaster

== See also ==
- Greencross
