= Age UK =

UK charity

- Type: Charity
- Founded: 1 April 2009; 17 years ago
- Headquarters: London, WC1; United Kingdom
- Revenue: 147,404,000 pound sterling (2018)
- Number of employees: 1,503 (2018)
- Website: ageuk.org.uk

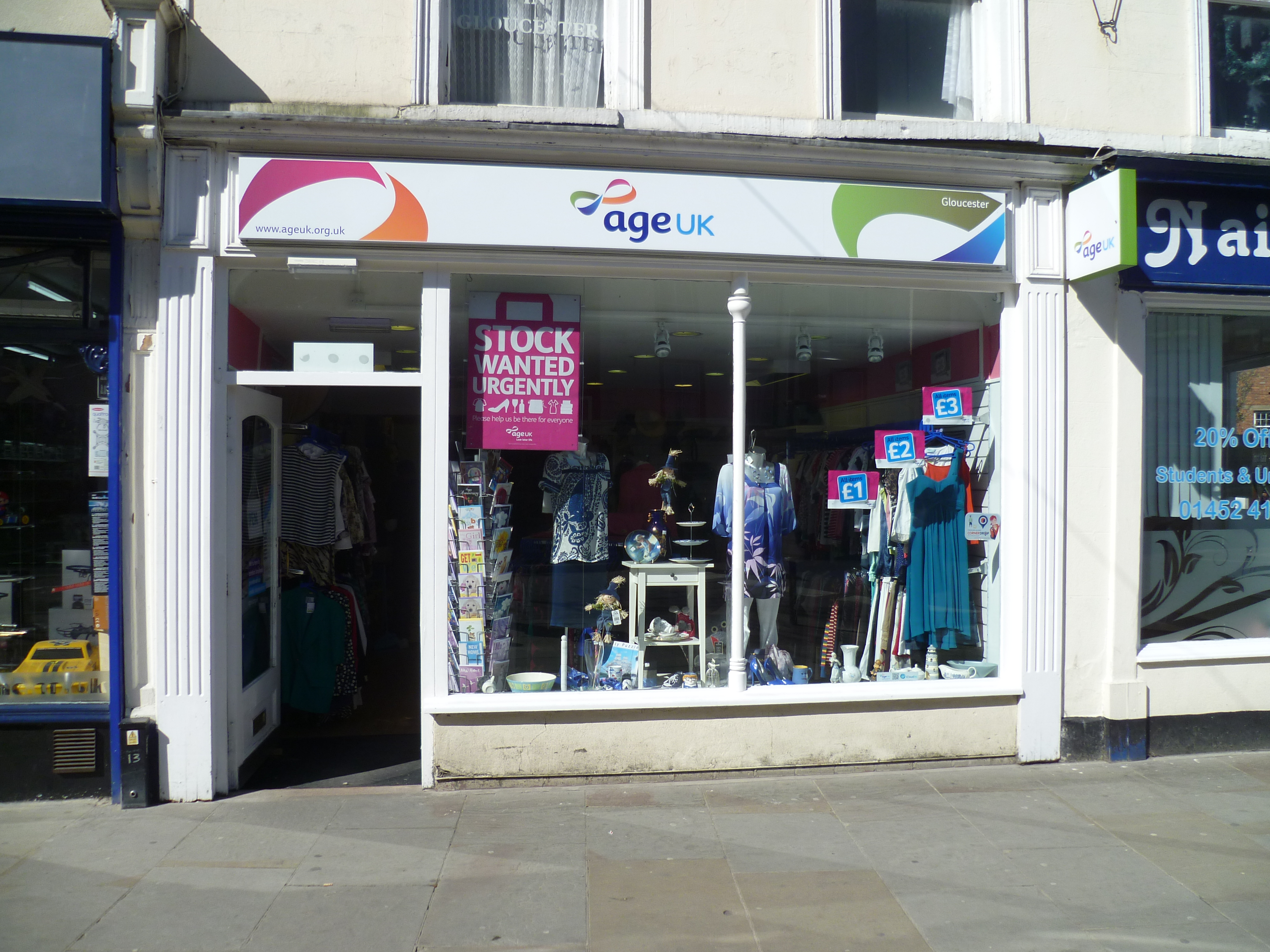
An Age UK shop in Northgate Street, Gloucester

Age UK is a registered charity in the United Kingdom, formed on 25 February 2009 and launched on 1 April 2009, as a merging of Age Concern England and Help the Aged.

Despite the national merger, many local Age Concern charities decided not to become brand partners of Age UK and continued as independent and completely separate Age Concerns and remain so to this day.

The charity operated as "Age Concern England and Help the Aged" until the new brand launch on 19 April 2010. The brand also includes separate but interdependent charities for the UK regions: Age Scotland, Age Cymru and Age NI, and an international charity, Age International.

The merger was the largest among charities in the UK since that of the Cancer Research Campaign and Imperial Cancer Research in 2002 to form Cancer Research UK.

Age UK also has a commercial arm, AgeCo Limited (formerly Age UK Enterprises Limited) operating under the brand name Age Co. It sells products and services designed for later life with its profits given back to the charity. The current range includes insurance, legal services, funeral plans, personal alarms, bathing solutions, stairlifts and homelifts.

== Structure ==
Age UK was formed in 2009 from the merger of Help the Aged and Age Concern England, creating an organisation with a combined income of around £160 million, including £47 million a year raised through fundraising, and over 520 charity shops, and income raised through its commercial services arm, AgeCo Limited (formerly Age UK Enterprises Limited)

The merger was first confirmed in September, when Dianne Jeffrey was confirmed as the new chair of trustees.

Tom Wright CBE, previously chief executive of VisitBritain and Trustee of the Imperial War Museum, was appointed Chief Executive of the new charity in November 2008. Tom Wright resigned in June 2017 to become the new Chief Executive of Guide Dogs.

In 2018, Steph Harland was appointed CEO, and Sir Brian Pomeroy Chair of Trustees.

== History ==
=== Age Concern ===
Age Concern's origins can be traced back to a realisation in Britain of the effects on aged people of the Second World War; the dislocation and breakdown of family life arising from conscription led to a recognition that existing poor laws failed to provide effective support for the elderly separated from family support networks. In 1940, the Old People's Welfare Committee (OPWC), chaired by Eleanor Rathbone, was formed as a sub-committee of Liverpool Personal Service Society to facilitate discussion among government and voluntary organisations. In 1944, the committee changed its name to the National Old People’s Welfare Committee (NOPWC) and took on responsibility for coordinating the activities of numerous local OPWCs.

From the 1950s, the NOPWC accessed government and local funds associated with the post-war development of the welfare state to provide services to local committees and training to wardens of old people's homes.

In 1971, under the direction of David Hobman, the NOPWC changed its public name to Age Concern and separated itself entirely from government and the National Council for Social Service (now National Council for Voluntary Organisations). It did so while also launching a "manifesto for old age" and establishing itself nationally as a lobbying body.

The directors of Age Concern England have included Hobman, Sally Greengross, and Gordon Lishman.

In 1986, Age Concern established an Institute of Gerontology at King's College London, into which it folded its own Age Concern Research Unit.

=== Help the Aged ===
Help the Aged was founded in 1961 by Cecil Jackson-Cole, with the aim to free disadvantaged older people from poverty, isolation and neglect.

== Branding ==
The two brand logos from the merged charities gradually disappeared after the new Age UK brand was launched (on 19 April 2010) and new brand-awareness developed during 2010. Hollywood stars Eleanor Bron, Brian Cox and Ian McKellen appeared in a series of TV advertisements to support the new charity.

== Fundraising ==
Age UK helps to fund, and is aided with funds raised by, the national will-making scheme Will aid, in which participating solicitors waive their usual fee to write a basic will and in exchange invite the client to donate to charity.

In January 2016, it was announced that Age UK's would be one of the chosen charities for Santander's The Discovery Project alongside Barnardo's. As well as giving financial donations to the charity project, Santander will also allow staff to volunteer on the phonelines.

== The Wireless ==
In April 2012, Age UK launched The Wireless radio station, initially an Internet-only station, broadcasting 24 hours a day, featuring Graham Dene (ex-Capital Radio and Virgin Radio) and David Hamilton (ex-BBC Radio and Saga Radio) as the lead presenters, The Wireless provided "a mix of music, entertainment, and information to improve later life in the UK". It also featured a weekly news and current affairs show, Agenda, hosted by broadcaster and former BBC newsreader Martyn Lewis. In 2018, Wireless Radio was scaled down to a playlist presented on TuneIn.

== Criticism ==
In 2016, Age UK was criticised for recommending an energy tariff through a partnership with E.On. The Sun claimed Age UK’s Enterprises division was overcharging customers signing up to a E.ON/Age Concern gas and electricity tariff marketed to older customers. It emerged that Age UK had made millions by providing insurance and funeral services to older people via Age UK Enterprises Ltd.

In 2019, it was claimed that Age UK was sending users through its commercial arm (Age Co) to an equity release advice service provided by Hub Financial, a company wholly owned by Just Group. While customers were told that Hub compared deals from a panel of five providers, its advice process was structured so that in most cases a customer would be offered a deal by just one panel member, namely Just.
