= Hobman =

Hobman is a surname. Notable people with the surname include:

- Al Hobman (1925–2008), New Zealand professional wrestler, trainer, and promoter
- Daisy L. Hobman, feminist writer
- David Hobman (1927–2003), British activist and broadcaster
- Joseph Burton Hobman (1872–1953), British politician and journalist
