= Age Scotland =

Scottish charity

- Type: Charity
- Founded: April 2009
- Headquarters: Scotland
- Key people: Katherine Crawford
- Website: www.agescotland.org.uk

Age Scotland is the national charity for older people in Scotland, UK. It is based in Edinburgh.

This registered charity formed on 1 April 2009 by the merger of Help the Aged in Scotland and Age Concern Scotland. It operated under its joint legacy brands as "Age Concern and Help the Aged in Scotland" until the new brand launched in April 2010. It also works interdependently with other UK charities, Age Cymru, Age NI and Age UK.

== Remit ==
The charity aims to act in partnership with others in promoting a better quality of life for Scotland's older people through:

- Campaigning and influencing on identified issues of concern, ensuring that older people's voices are heard at local authority, Holyrood and Westminster levels, as well as globally through lobbying and campaigning activities and strategic partnerships.
- Supporting older people through the Age Scotland helpline, factsheets and its website.
- Working with local older people's groups across Scotland to help build stronger communities through its development staff and grants programme.

In 2023, Katherine Crawford is the CEO for Age Scotland.

== History ==
Age Concern Scotland developed out of several Older People's Welfare Associations founded in 1944 during the Second World War.

Help the Aged in Scotland was established in 1986, when UK charity Help the Aged, founded in 1961, set up a permanent office in Edinburgh.

Age Concern Scotland offered a range of services directly, piloting programmes and developing locally based provision, while Help the Aged in Scotland was considered more as a campaigning and lobbying organisation.

The two charities collaborated on many issues and contributed to the 2002 introduction of Free Personal and Nursing Care and the implementation of the Adult Support and Protection Act in 2007. A joint campaign in 2005 led to the Burt Review of Council Tax, the report "A Fairer Way" the following year and the eventual freezing of the tax in Scotland for several years. They merged in 2009 to form the new organisation, Age Scotland.

== Fundraising ==
Age Scotland had a £6.7 million income in 2022. Their income is funded through corporate partnerships, public funding, legacies and donations, fundraising events and charity shops around Scotland. It also runs Age Scotland Enterprises, which offers non-life insurance and planning-for-retirement products.

Age Scotland also leads the Unforgotten Forces partnership which received almost £1million in government funding in 2023.
