= Death planning =

Death planning may refer to:

- Estate planning
- Planning for end-of-life care
