= Daisy L. Hobman =

English writer, biographer, and social worker

Daisy Lucie Hobman
- Born: Daisy Lucie Adler; 17 November 1891; London, England
- Died: 24 December 1961 (aged 70); Hove, England
- Education: St Hilda's College, Oxford
- Occupations: Author; biographer; essayist; social worker
- Organization: British Humanist Association
- Notable work: The welfare state (1953); Olive Schreiner: her friends and times (1955); Go spin, you jade!: studies in the emancipation of woman (1957)
- Spouse: Joseph Burton Hobman
- Children: David Hobman

Daisy L. Hobman (née Adler; 17 November 1891 – 24 December 1961) was a feminist writer, biographer, social worker, and founding member of Brighton and Hove Humanist Group. She was the first person to gain an Oxford diploma in social studies.

== Life ==
Daisy Lucie Hobman was born in London, but spent much of her life in Sussex. She attended St Hilda's College, Oxford, gaining a Diploma in Economics and Political Science. In 1926, she married journalist and Liberal politician Joseph Burton Hobman in a civil ceremony.

A correspondent later described the atmosphere of the household for The Times:

For 30 years, both during the life of her husband... and after his death, the Hobman fireside was a place where an extraordinary variety of people warmed more than their hands and feet. Conversation sparkled, and whoever came round the door was drawn into the stream of talk, whether a literary lion, a diffident refugee, or the maid bringing coffee from the kitchen.

The couple's son, David Burton Hobman (1927–2003), raised in this "freethinking intellectual family", was an expert on the social and economic impacts of ageing, and a campaigner for the welfare of the elderly. Between 1970 and 1987 he was Director of the charity Age Concern, and was appointed CBE in 1973. Daisy Hobman wrote biographies of Rahel Varnhagen, Olive Schreiner, and John Thurloe, as well as other works of fiction and non-fiction. Stevie Smith reviewed Go Spin, You Jade! for The Observer, describing it as "a disturbing study, though in most temperate terms, of the lot of women through the ages and how at last they became emancipated." Hobman's biography of Thurloe—Oliver Cromwell's Secretary of State—was described by The Times as having:

real merit and charm, due mainly to the agreeable manner in which she rambles along commenting on anything in Thurloe's papers which engages her attention. Nothing was too large or too small to enter Thurloe's net, and Mrs. Hobman's capacity for selecting the best from his catch is unfailing.

Hobman also assisted Vera Brittain in the preparation of her book The Women at Oxford; a fragment of a history, and translated German author Friedrich Griese's story Winter in 1929. This was described as a "vivid word picture... of a German village, its folk, and the disasters, domestic and social, that befell the residents".

Hobman, alongside H. J. Blackham and Denis Cobell, was an active part of the "secular-humanist scene" during the 1950s, and a founding member of the Brighton and Hove Humanist Group. On her death, on 24 December 1961, she was lauded for her "criticism and generosity", which she was said to have "wielded in a lifelong campaign for honesty and courage".

== Bibliography ==
- One who loved: the story of Rahel Levin (1932)
- The secret barrier (1938)
- The welfare state (1953)
- Olive Schreiner: her friends and times (1955)
- Go spin, you jade!: studies in the emancipation of woman (1957)
- Cromwell's master spy: a study of John Thurloe (1961)
