= Alan Greengross =

British Conservative politician

Sir Alan Greengross

Leader of the Opposition on Greater London Council
- In office 1983–1986
- Preceded by: Horace Cutler
- Succeeded by: Council was abolished

Leader of the Opposition on Camden Council
- In office 1974–1979
- Preceded by: Martin Morton
- Succeeded by: Julian Tobin

Personal details
- Born: 15 April 1929
- Died: 13 August 2018 (aged 89)
- Party: Conservative
- Spouse: Sally Rosengarten

Sir Alan David Greengross (15 April 1929 – 13 August 2018) was a British politician, who served as the final leader of the Conservative Party on the Greater London Council (GLC).

Born in London, Alan's father Morris was Mayor of Holborn in the 1960s, while his sister Wendy became a well known counsellor.

Greengross was educated at University College School in Hampstead, and then undertook National Service with the Royal Air Force before studying law at Trinity College, Cambridge. After graduation, he joined the family business, the precision engineering firm Indusmond (Diamond Tools) Ltd; he later became its chair and managing director. In 1959, he married Sally Rosengarten, who later became Director General of Age Concern England.

Greengross was elected to Camden London Borough Council when it was first established, in 1964, and he became leader of the Conservative Party group on the council, the official opposition. In 1978, under his leadership, the party almost won control of the council, which remained its best ever result some forty years later.

In the 1977 Greater London Council election, Greengross was elected to represent Hampstead, and when in 1979 he was appointed as chair of the council's planning committee, he resigned from Camden Council. He became leader of the Conservative group on the council in 1983, when it was in opposition, and initially focused on boycotting the council's "Peace Year". Only three days before the publication of the party's manifesto for the 1983 general election, he was informed that it proposed the abolition of the council. He opposed this, and produced alternative plans for a smaller council, which he believed would convince the party's leadership to retain it. However, he was perceived as being on the "wet" or centrist wing of the party, and had little influence with national leader Margaret Thatcher.

The GLC was abolished in 1986, Greengross receiving a knighthood. He became chair of the Tory Reform Group, and worked at the Bartlett School of Architecture at University College London. In 1990, he was appointed as chair of the Bloomsbury and Islington Health Authority, but left after two years, with the body facing a large deficit. From 1996, he was chair of the London Regional Passengers' Committee, then in 2001 he moved to become a director of South West Trains. He retired from this position in 2007, and focused on voluntary work with young people, and charitable work following the 2004 Indian Ocean earthquake and tsunami.

Party political offices
Preceded by Horace Cutler	Leader of the Conservative Party on the Greater London Council; 1983–1986	Succeeded by Council abolished
