= Jule Sugarman =

American public administrator

- Born: Jule Meyer Sugarman; September 23, 1927; Cincinnati, Ohio
- Died: November 2, 2010 (aged 83); Seattle, Washington, U.S.
- Known for: Founding the Head Start

Jule Meyer Sugarman (September 23, 1927 – November 2, 2010) was an American public administrator who founded Head Start and led the program for its first five years. Throughout his life, Sugarman was an advocate for the rights of children, the poor, and the aged. In addition to his service to the United States government, he was known for his work with organizations like the Gray Panthers and the Special Olympics.

== Early life ==
Born in Cincinnati to Melville Sugarman, a jeweler, and Rachel Meyer, a nursery school teacher, Sugarman entered Western Reserve University (later to become Case Western Reserve University). His studies were cut short by World War II, in which he served in the United States Army as a staff supply sergeant in Japan. He completed his undergraduate degree in public administration at American University.

== Professional career ==
Sugarman worked at various positions in the United States Civil Service Commission starting in 1951. He worked in the Office of Management and Budget from 1957 to 1959, then worked for the United States Department of Justice in the Federal Bureau of Prisons until 1962, when he took a position with the Bureau of Inter-American Affairs at the United States Department of State.

Sugarman, described by Edward Zigler as an "administrative genius", served as the executive secretary of the 13-member planning panel that was commissioned by Lyndon Johnson to create Head Start as part of the War on Poverty. The team included specialists in education, pediatricians and psychologists who designed a program aimed at ending the cycle in which children become "inheritors of poverty's curse". Originally proposed as a summer program, Head Start quickly morphed into a year-long program. Sugarman took over as head of the program from Julius B. Richmond, the original holder of that post, when Richmond became ill.

Following the advice of Sargent Shriver of the Office of Economic Opportunity "to write Head Start across this land so that no Congress or president will ever destroy it", Sugarman oversaw the immediate increase of enrollment in the program to more than double the projected number of participants, starting with 560,000 children in the first year versus a target of only 250,000. In subsequent years the program exceeded 700,000 participants. By the time of his death, Head Start was serving 900,000 children annually and had served 27 million children since its inception.

Sugarman became the Human Resources Administrator of New York City in 1970. He subsequently moved into a cooperative apartment in Manhattan with his wife Sheila and their children. In this role, he was expected to reform the city's welfare programs an find savings in the budget, a perennial challenge. He often worked 14 hour days and developed a reputation for his exacting standards.

During the Carter administration, Sugarman served as vice chairman on the Civil Service Commission and in the Office of Personnel Management. He later served as director of the Special Olympics. Throughout his life, Sugarman was an advocate for social programs for children and the poor, and he proposed an act which would fund child programs through payroll tax, similar to the federal funding provided to the Social Security program.

In 1992 Sugarman accepted the position of Interim executive director of the Gray Panthers, then on the brink of insolvency, to help the group reorganize its by-laws, its board of directors, and its fundraising.

== Death ==
Sugarman died at age 83 of cancer on November 2, 2010, at his home in Seattle. He was survived by his second wife Candace Sullivan, as well as three children and eight grandchildren. His first wife, Sheila Shanley Sugarman, had died in 1983, while a son Christopher Mel Sugarman had died in 2002.
