= Elder law in the United States =

Legal field focused on needs of the aged

Elder law is an area of legal practice that specializes on issues that affect the senior population. Some say the purpose of elder law planning is to prepare the elderly person for financial freedom and autonomy through proper financial planning and long-term care options. However, the purpose of elder law is not so narrow. Not everyone needs long-term care and not everyone is financially insecure. The purpose of elder law is to provide holistic legal advice that allows older persons and disabled individuals to preserve and protect their rights and values. Often these values are implemented by others, which is why thoughtful planning is necessary.

== Categories ==
The three major categories that make up elder law are:

1. Estate planning and administration, including tax questions
2. Medicaid, disability and other long-term care issues
3. Guardianship, conservatorship and commitment matters, including fiduciary administration

Other issues found under the umbrella of elder law include such areas as:

- estate planning
- wills
- trusts
- guardianships
- protection against elder abuse, neglect, and fraud
- end-of-life planning
- all levels of disability and medical care
- retirement planning
- Social Security benefits
- Medicare and Medicaid coverage
- Medicaid planning
- consumer protection
- nursing homes and in-home care
- powers of attorney
- physicians' or medical care directives, declarations and powers of attorney
- landlord/tenant needs
- real estate and mortgage assistance
- various levels of advice, counseling and advocacy of rights
- tax issues
- discrimination

== History ==
Elder law developed as a specialty because as lifespans increased there was an increased need for medical care, care giving, and financial management.

The Older Americans Act (OAA), originally signed into law by President Lyndon B. Johnson on July 14, 1965 (the same year Medicare was created), created the Administration on Aging (AOA), a division within the Department of Health and Human Services. The OAA also authorized grants to States for community planning and services programs, funding for research, and demonstration and training projects in the field of aging.

In 1972 Amendments to the OAA added the national nutrition program for the elderly. The OAA of 2000 was amended on November 13, 2000, to include the National Family Caregiver Support Program, which was intended to help hundreds of thousands of family members who are struggling to care for their older loved ones who are ill or who have disabilities. This program provides grant funding for combined services between state and local agencies for such things as counseling, support groups, respite and other community-based services. These services are focused on the care of the frail and aging members of society. The program also provides services geared towards the family units of grandparents and other older relatives now in the stages of care-taking for related children eighteen years of age and under.

Elder law is an expansion of the traditional trust and estates practice.

== Careers in or associated with elder law ==
Careers that are developing around the area of Elder Law include:

- social workers
- lawyers
- paralegals
- legal assistants
- legal secretaries
- guardians ad litem (GAL)
- various types of psychologists
- care givers
- financial planners
- policy makers and legal advocates
- benefit specialists
- Better Business Bureau
- Attorney General's Office
- Consumer Protection Agency
- political watch-dog groups
- health care providers
- researchers
- funeral planners
- grief counselors
- case workers
- abuse & fraud investigators
- educators
- product developers
- transportation providers
- entertainment and tour guides
- real estate agents
- mortgage brokers
- insurance providers
- elder companions

Essentially any career field can create a benefit to the aging of modern society.

== See also ==
- Elder rights
- Gerontology
- Nursing home residents' rights
