= Maintenance and Welfare of Parents and Senior Citizens Act, 2007 =

Indian law

Maintenance and Welfare of Parents and Senior Citizens Act, 2007 is a legislation, initiated by Ministry of Social Justice and Empowerment, Government of India to provide more effective provision for maintenance and welfare of parents and senior citizens. It makes it a legal obligation for children and heirs to provide maintenance to senior citizens and parents, by monthly allowance. It also provides simple, speedy and inexpensive mechanism for the protection of life and property of the older persons. After being passed by the Parliament of India, it received President's assent on December 29, 2007.

The first case under the act was filed in November 2011 by Siluvai (age 84) and his wife Arulammal (age 80) of Tuticorin against their son and daughter-in-law for neglect, besides taking away their two homes and gold jewellery.

== Objectives of the Act ==
This act provides an in-expensive and speedy procedure to claim monthly maintenance for parents and senior citizens. This act casts obligations on children to maintain their parents/grandparents and also the relative of the senior citizens to maintain such senior citizens. The main attraction of this act is there are provisions to protect the life and property of such persons. This act also provides for the setting up of old age homes for providing maintenance to the indigent senior citizens and parents. This Act extends to the whole of India.

== Definitions ==
- Children include son, daughter, grandson, granddaughter, son-in-law, daughter-in-law, but not a minor
- Maintenance includes provision for food, clothing, residence, medical attendance and treatment
- Parent means father or mother whether biological, adoptive or step father or step mother, whether or not father or mother is a senior citizen
- Senior citizen means an Indian aged 60 years or above
- Relative means any legal heir of childless senior citizen who is not a minor and is in possession of or would inherit his\her property after his\her death
- Welfare means provision for food, healthcare, recreation, and other necessary amenities for senior citizens

== Maintenance of parents and senior citizens ==
A senior citizen including parent who is unable to maintain himself from his own earning or out of the property owned by him, is entitled to get relief under this Act. Children/grand children are under obligation to maintain his or her parent either father, mother or both. Likewise, relative of a senior citizen is also bound to look after the senior citizen. If such children or relative is not maintaining his parents or senior citizen respectively, then the parents/senior citizen can seek the assistance of Tribunal constituted under this Act, to enforce the remedy of maintenance. Such parents/ senior citizen can file an application before the Tribunal, claiming maintenance and other reliefs from their children/relatives as the case may be.

Such application for maintenance can be filed by the senior citizen or a parent himself, or if such person is incapable, then by any other person or any registered organisation authorised by him. The Tribunal can also suo motu take cognizance of the case. After receiving the application the Tribunal may issue notice to the respondent-children/relative and provide them time to furnish their reply. Such application for maintenance should be disposed of within 90 days from the date of service of notice of application to the respondent. However, the Tribunal can extend time for a maximum period of 30 days in exceptional circumstances after recording reason. The Tribunal is having power to allow interim maintenance pending disposal of the case. Even though the application can be filed against any of children/relative as the case may be, such respondent-children/relative can implead other person who are liable to pay maintenance.

If such children/relative who are directed to pay maintenance fail to comply with the order of tribunal without sufficient cause, the Tribunal may issue warrant for levying the due amount from them in the manner levying fines and can also sentence the erring respondent to imprisonment that may extend to one month or until payment made whichever is earlier. The Tribunal will not issue Warrant to execute the order of maintenance, if such petition for execution is filed after a period of 3 months from the date on which the maintenance is due. The application under this Act can be filed before the Tribunal in any district, where the applicant resides or last resided or where children or relative resides. The evidence of proceedings shall be taken in the presence of children/relative against whom relief is sought and if such respondent is willfully avoiding service of summons or neglecting to attend the Tribunal, the Tribunal may proceed and determine the case ex parte. If the Tribunal is satisfied that such children/relative against whom such application for maintenance is pending, neglect or refuses to maintain the parents/senior citizens as the case may be, may order such children/relative to pay monthly allowance to such applicant. The maximum amount of maintenance that can be allowed by the Tribunal is Rs.Ten Thousand per month. The tribunal has power to alter, modify or cancel the order in appropriate circumstances. The Tribunal has also power to levy interest on the maintenance amount, which shall be not less than 5% and greater than 18%. Aggrieved by the order of Tribunal, senior citizen/parent can file appeal before Appellate tribunal within a period of 60 days and if the Appellate tribunal is satisfied that there occurred some delay in filing appeal due to sufficient cause, the appeal can be entertained.

== Protection of life and property of senior citizen ==
If a senior citizen after the commencement of this Act, has transferred his property either moveable or immovable, by way of gift or otherwise, subject to the condition that the transferee shall provide him basic amenities and physical needs and thereafter such transferee reuses or fails to provide such promise, such transfer of property shall be deemed to have been made by fraud, coercion or undue influence and the Tribunal can declare such transfer as void. Before the enactment of this law, a senior citizen's only remedy in such a case was to approach the court for maintenance from the children to whom he had given the property by way of gift or otherwise and such property would be the exclusive property of the transferee and the senior citizen had no right in such property. After the Act, the senior citizen can reclaim such property from the transferee. Police must give priority to such cases. Representation by lawyers is prohibited under Section 17, though the Kerala High Court held that legal practitioners may represent parties under this Act.

Abandoning a senior citizen in any place by a person who is having the care or protection of such senior citizen is a criminal offence and such person shall be punishable with imprisonment for a term which may extend to three months or fine which may extend to five thousand rupees or both.

This Act also provides that state governments may establish old age homes at least one in one district to accommodate indigent senior citizens. State governments may also ensure proper medical care for senior citizens.

== Dates of commencement ==
The subject matter of the Act being a state subject, implementation and declaration of commencement dates were left to the states and union territories. Most states and UTs have notified the commencement date, except Himachal Pradesh and Jammu and Kashmir. Himachal Pradesh has its own law on the subject. The Act was originally not applicable to Jammu and Kashmir, vide section 1(2) of the Act; this inapplicability has been removed by the Jammu and Kashmir Reorganisation Act, 2019. The dates of commencement are as under:

States

Jharkhand, Karnataka — 1 April 2008
Nagaland — 22 April 2008
Andhra Pradesh, Telangana — 28 April 2008
Punjab — 15 July 2008
Rajasthan — 1 August 2008
Arunachal Pradesh — 6 August 2008
Tripura — 15 August 2008
Madhya Pradesh — 23 August 2008
Tamil Nadu — 29 September 2008
Kerala — 24 September 2008
Chhattisgarh — 26 September 2008
Goa, Odisha — 1 October 2008
Assam — 4 October 2008
Gujarat — 7 October 2008
Haryana — 22 October 2008
Uttarakhand — 1 November 2008
West Bengal — 5 December 2008
Mizoram — 1 January 2009
Maharashtra — 1 March 2009
Manipur — 30 October 2009
Bihar — 19 October 2011
Sikkim — 1 February 2012
Meghalaya — 22 June 2012
Uttar Pradesh — 25 September 2012

Union Territories

Andaman and Nicobar Islands — 21 May 2008
Delhi — 1 September 2008
Dadra and Nagar Haveli and Daman and Diu — 17 September 2008
Lakshadweep — 22 September 2008
Chandigarh — 22 October 2008
Puducherry — 1 November 2008
Jammu and Kashmir, Ladakh — 31 October 2019

== See also ==
- Elder law in India
- Ageing
