= Maggie Kuhn =

American activist (1905–1995)

- Kuhn, in 1978
- Born: Margaret Eliza Kuhn; August 3, 1905; Buffalo, New York, U.S.
- Died: April 22, 1995 (aged 89); Philadelphia, Pennsylvania, U.S.
- Occupation: Elder rights activist
- Known for: Gray Panthers

Margaret Eliza "Maggie" Kuhn (August 3, 1905 – April 22, 1995) was an American activist known for founding the Gray Panthers movement, after she was forced to retire from her job at the then-mandatory retirement age of 65. The Gray Panthers became known for advocating nursing home reform and fighting ageism, claiming that "old people and women constitute America's biggest untapped and undervalued human energy source." She dedicated her life to fighting for human rights, social and economic justice, global peace, integration, and an understanding of mental health issues. For decades, she combined her activism with caring for her disabled mother and a brother who suffered from mental illness. Embracing her age and activism, she referred to herself as a "wrinkled radical." By the mid-1970s, Kuhn had achieved national celebrity status, speaking at over 200 engagements a year and appearing on shows like 'The Phil Donahue Show,' 'Today,' and 'The Tonight Show' with Johnny Carson. In 1978, the World Almanac named her one of the 25 most influential women in the United States, while the American Humanist Association named her Humanist of the Year.

== Early life and career ==
Kuhn was born in Buffalo, New York, the elder of Minnie Louise Kooman and Samuel Frederick Kuhn's two children. Her father managed the Memphis, Tennessee office of the conservative Bradstreet Company (later Dun & Bradstreet). She spent her childhood in Cleveland, Ohio and Buffalo as her mother did not want her children raised in the then-segregated South, and then majored in English at the Flora Stone Mather College of Case Western Reserve University.

She worked for the YWCA in both Cleveland, OH and Philadelphia, PA from 1930 to 1941, and for the National Board of the YWCA in New York, NY from 1941 to 1947. During this time she developed a strong theoretical and practical framework for social justice and activism. She educated women about unionizing, women's issues, and social issues. She caused controversy by starting a human sexuality class in which she discussed such topics as the mechanics of sex, birth control, sexual pleasure, pregnancy, and the difficulties of remaining single in a culture where marriage is the norm. During World War II, she became program director for the YWCA-USO, which was a controversial career choice due to her opposition to the war. In spite of this, she continued to advocate a progressive stance on issues such as desegregation, urban housing, McCarthyism, the Cold War, and nuclear arms.

Kuhn worked for the General Alliance of Unitarian and Other Liberal Christian Women in Boston, MA from 1947 to 1948. She then worked for the Presbyterian Church's national Board of Christian Education from 1948 until 1965, and for the Presbyterian Board of National Missions from 1965 to 1970. She was able to work at the national level of the church to help shape the shift in focus from the social gospel framework to that of social justice. This gave a more powerful framework, social dimension, and social justice themes to this work of the church and the way the church interpreted the Old and New Testaments. This may be, in part, rooted in her ancestral Jewish background and the tradition of tikkun olam. While tradition confined most seminarians to fieldwork within churches, Kuhn declared that none of her students would pass unless they went out and found poverty within the local community.

== Gray Panthers ==
In 1970, although she was working at a job she loved with the Presbyterian Church, she was forced to retire the day she turned 65 because of the mandatory retirement law then in effect. That year, she banded together with other retirees and formed the movement that became known as the Gray Panthers. It was originally called "The Consultation of Older and Younger Adults for Social Change." The name "Gray Panthers" was first suggested by Rev. Reuben Gums, a WPIX-TV producer in New York City, who, after hearing Kuhn advocate for militancy among older adults, proposed the more impactful name. It was quickly adopted as their public identity, attracting media attention and public support, and became the official name of the movement in 1972. In 1977, an appearance on The Tonight Show with Johnny Carson further popularized the name. Carson mistakenly introduced Kuhn as part of the "Black Panthers" before correcting himself.

On Johnny Carson’s Tonight Show on February 18, 1977, a gray-haired, seventy-two-year-old white woman wearing a Mao jacket with her hair in a bun strode out as one of Carson’s guests. In his opening monologue, he mistakenly introduced her as Maggie Kuhn of “the Black Panthers” and then, cracking up as he realized his not-inconsiderable mistake, corrected himself while emphasizing that she was the founder of the Gray Panthers, not the Black Panthers, and that she was a champion for 'old people’s power'. Kuhn in turn assured him it was OK to mix up the name in the monologue because she said the Black Panthers and Gray Panthers were collaborating on 'some very good things.'

Seeing all issues of injustice as inevitably linked, the Gray Panthers refused to restrict themselves to elder rights activism, but focused also on peace, presidential elections, poverty, and civil liberties. Their first big issue was opposition to the Vietnam War.

After an elderly woman was murdered and robbed of $309 after cashing a check, Kuhn enlisted the help of Ralph Nader who set up a meeting with the president of the First Pennsylvania Bank. The bank agreed to establish special check-drawn savings accounts for people over 65 free of charge and make loans more accessible to older people.

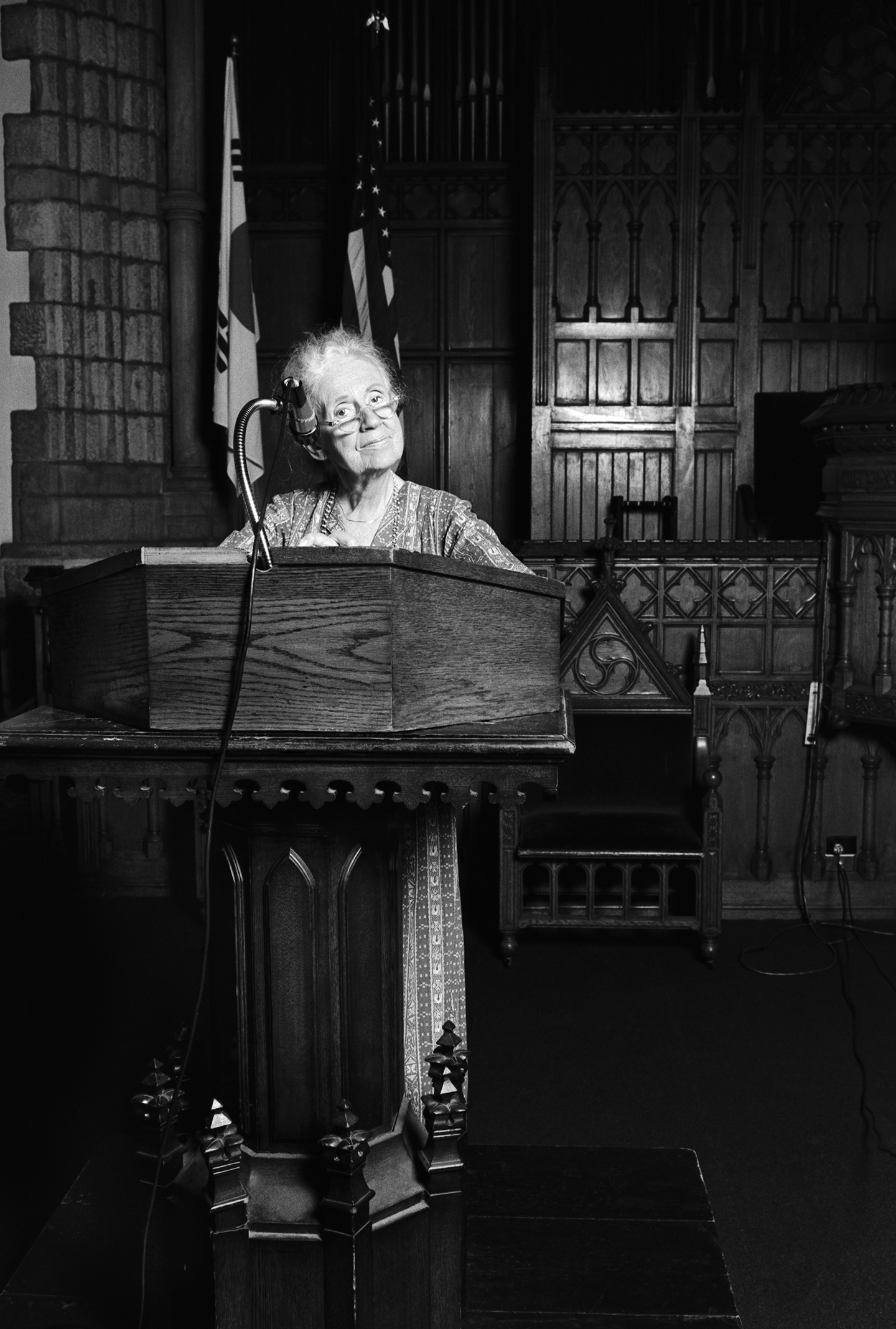
Maggie Kuhn photographed in 1978 by Lynn Gilbert

The Gray Panthers' motto was "Age and Youth In Action," and many of its members were high school and college students. Kuhn believed that teens should be taken more seriously and given more responsibility by society. To her, this was just another example of a fast-paced, exploitative culture wasting vital human resources.

The Gray Panthers also combated the then-popular "disengagement theory," which argues that old age involves a necessary separation from society as a prelude to death. Kuhn implicated the American lifestyle for treating the old as problems of society and not as persons experiencing the problems created by society. She accused gerontologists of perpetuating the illusion of old people as incapacitated, noting that grant money seemed to favor such research. She called into question the representation of old people in popular media.

Kuhn raised controversy by openly discussing the sexuality of older people, and shocked the public with her assertion that older women, who outlive men by an average of 8 years, could develop sexual relationships with younger men or each other. She also took a stance on Social Security, arguing that politicians had created an intergenerational war over federal funds in order to divert public attention from the real budgetary issues: overspending on the military and extravagant tax breaks for the rich.

Kuhn criticized housing for the elderly, calling them "glorified playpens". While acknowledging that they helped to keep seniors safe, she contended that they also segregated the elderly from mainstream society. In Maggie Kuhn on Aging, she described the structural reforms needed to address these problems with elder housing, mandatory retirement, and social and economic inequities. During her years as a Gray Panther activist, she lived in her own home in Philadelphia, Pennsylvania. She shared that home with younger adults, who received a break on rent in exchange for their help with chores and their companionship. Maggie called this community her "family of choice." Kuhn founded the Shared Housing Resource Center. She worked with Anne Hays Egan and Carroll L. Estes to develop the Festival of the Ages in Princeton, in 1981. The proceedings of the festival were published as a book, Empowering Ministry in an Ageist Society.

Kuhn wrote her autobiography, No Stone Unturned, in 1991—four years before she died of cardiac arrest in Philadelphia at the age of 89. In 1995, Kuhn was inducted into the National Women's Hall of Fame.

== Archival collections ==
The Presbyterian Historical Society in Philadelphia, Pennsylvania, has a collection of Maggie Kuhn's correspondence, administrative documents, printed matter, reports, books, photographs and other materials that document her personal life and professional work.
