= Gordon Lishman =

British activist, politician, and writer

Arthur Gordon Lishman CBE, known as Gordon Lishman (born 1947) is a British social and elder rights activist, Liberal politician, writer and former Director General of Age Concern England.

== Career ==
Lishman graduated in economics and political science from the University of Manchester in 1968. Together with Tony Greaves, Lishman moved the Liberal Party's Community Politics motion in 1970. In 1980, he co-wrote The Theory and Practice of Community Politics with Bernard Greaves. He was the Liberal Party Parliamentary Candidate for Bradford North in the February 1974 and October 1974 General Elections, and for Pendle in the 1983 and 1987 General Elections. For the Liberal Democrats, he contested Blackburn in the 2015 general election and Pendle in the 2017 general election. He contested Pendle again in the 2019 general election, finishing third with 3.5% of the vote, up from his third place result of 2.1% two years earlier.

Lishman joined Age Concern England in 1974, becoming Director General of the charity in 2000. He left in 2009, after the charity had lost £22 million on the Heyday project, having led the charity through to its merger with Help the Aged, to form a new charity, Age UK.

He was appointed an Officer of the Order of the British Empire (OBE) in the 1994 New Year Honours and promoted to Commander of the same Order (CBE) in the 2006 New Year Honours for services to older people.

Lishman was awarded an Honorary Fellowship from the University of Central Lancashire in 2002. In 2007, he was asked by Ivan Lewis to chair the Department of Health's Nutrition Action Plan Delivery Board.

== Bibliography ==
- Participation in a Competitive Economy – Peter McGregor and Gordon Lishman, Liberal Publication Department, ISBN 0-900520-04-3
- A Redefinition of Retirement – Gordon Lishman, Liberal Publication Department, ISBN 0-900520-44-2
