= Estate planning =

Process of planning for inheritance of property

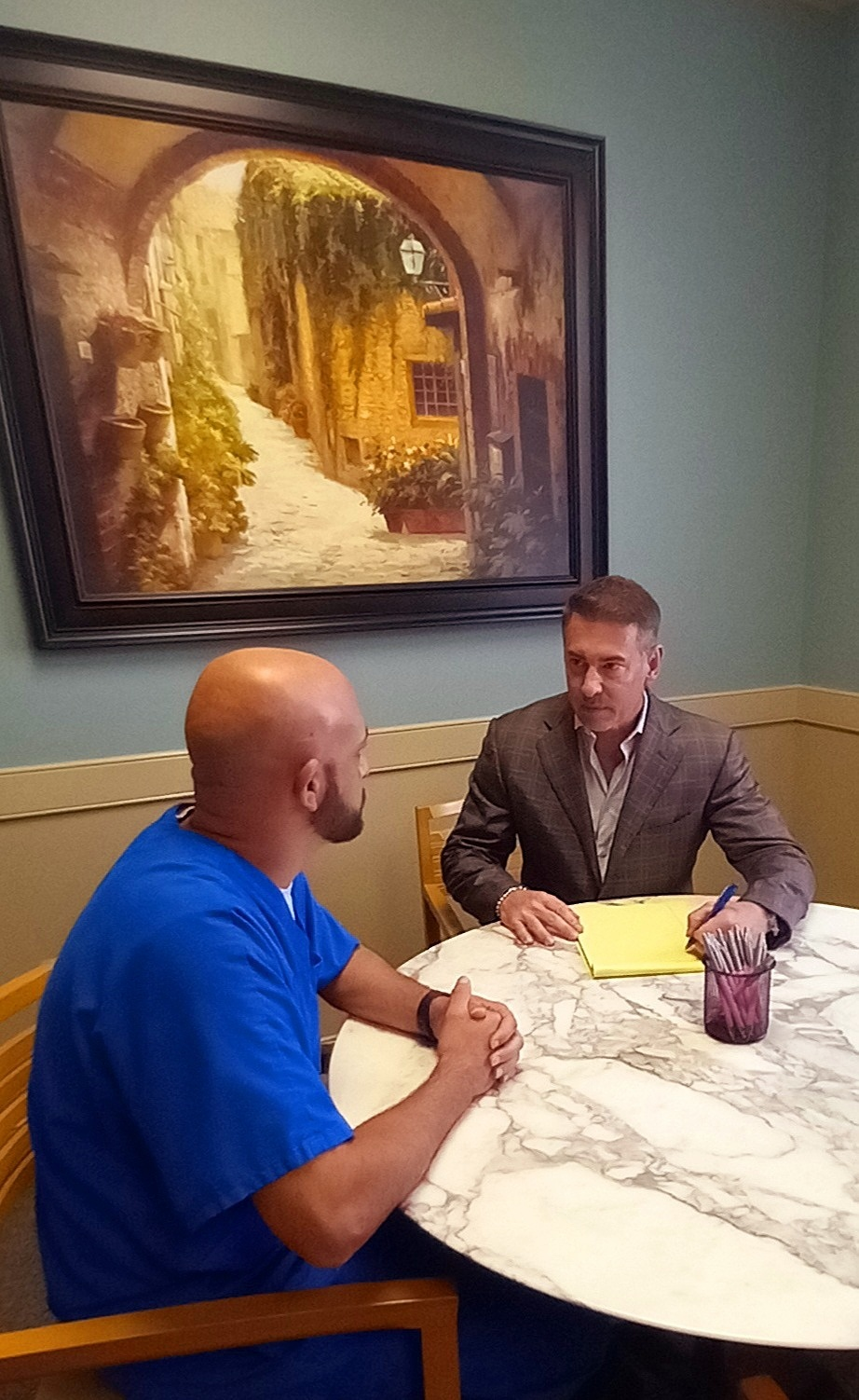
An attorney meets with client for estate planning.

Estate planning or inheritance planning is the process of anticipating and arranging for the management of a person's estate or net worth during the person's life in preparation for future incapacity or death. The planning includes the bequest of assets to heirs, loved ones, and/or charity, and may include legal tax avoidance. Estate planning includes planning for incapacity, reducing or eliminating uncertainties over the administration of a probate, and maximizing the value of the estate by reducing taxes and other expenses. The estate owner's specific goals determine the ultimate goal of estate planning and may be as simple or as complex as the owner's wishes and needs dictate. Guardians are often designated for minor children and beneficiaries with incapacity.

== Taxation ==
Avoidance of income tax, gift tax, capital gains tax, inheritance tax, and generation-skipping transfer tax plays a significant role in choosing the structure and vehicles used to create an estate plan.

In the United States, assets left to a spouse who is a U.S. citizen or any qualified charity are not subject to U.S. Federal estate tax. Assets left to any other heir, including the decedent's children, may be taxed if that portion of the estate has a value in excess of the lifetime gift, estate, and generation-skipping transfer tax exemption amount. As of 2023, the federal exemption amount was $12,920,000. For a married couple, the combined exemption is $25,840,000.

=== Tax strategies ===
One way to minimize or avoid U.S. Federal gift, estate, and generation-skipping transfer taxes is to distribute the property in incremental gifts during the person's lifetime. Individuals may give away as much as $17,000 per year (in 2023) to another person without incurring gift tax or using up any of their lifetime exemption amount. Other tax-free alternatives include paying tuition expenses or medical expenses free of gift tax, but only if the payments are made directly to the educational institution or medical provider.

Other tax-advantaged alternatives to leaving property outside a will include qualified or non-qualified retirement plans (e.g., 401(k) plans and IRAs), certain "trustee" bank accounts, transfer-on-death (TOD) financial accounts, and life insurance proceeds.

Because life insurance proceeds generally are not taxed for U.S. Federal income tax purposes, a life insurance trust could be used to pay estate taxes. However, if the decedent holds any incidents of ownership like the ability to remove or change a beneficiary, the proceeds will be treated as part of the decedent's estate and generally will be subject to the U.S. Federal estate tax. For this reason, a trust vehicle is often used to own the life insurance policy. The trust must be irrevocable to avoid taxation on the life insurance proceeds, and it is typically called an irrevocable life insurance trust (ILIT).

== Devices ==
Estate planning may involve a will, trusts, beneficiary designations, powers of appointment, property ownership (for example, joint tenancy with rights of survivorship, tenancy in common, tenancy by the entirety), gifts, and powers of attorney (specifically a durable financial power of attorney and a durable medical power of attorney).

More sophisticated estate plans may cover deferring or decreasing inheritance taxes or business succession.

=== Wills ===
Wills are a common estate-planning tool and are usually the simplest device for planning the distribution of an estate. It must be created and executed in compliance with the laws of the jurisdiction where it is created. If probate proceedings occur in a different jurisdiction, it is important to ensure that the will complies with the laws of that jurisdiction, or that the jurisdiction will follow the provisions of a valid out-of-state will even if those provisions might be invalid for a will executed in that jurisdiction.

=== Trusts ===
A trust may be used as an estate planning tool to direct the distribution of assets after the person who creates the trust passes away or becomes incapacitated. Trusts may be used to provide for the distribution of funds for the benefit of minor children or developmentally disabled children. For example, a spendthrift trust may be used to prevent wasteful spending by a spendthrift child, or a special needs trust may be used for developmentally disabled children or adults. Trusts offer a high degree of control over the management and disposition of assets. Furthermore, certain types of trust provisions can provide for the management of wealth for several generations past the settlor. Typically referred to as dynasty planning, these trust provisions allow the protection of wealth for several generations after a person's death.

=== Advance directives ===
An estate plan may include creating advance directives, which are documents that direct what will happen to a person's personal care if the person becomes legally incapacitated. For example, an estate plan may include a healthcare proxy, durable power of attorney, and living will.

After widespread litigation and media coverage surrounding the Terri Schiavo case, estate planning attorneys often advise clients to also create a living will, which is a form of an advance directive. Specific final arrangements, such as whether to be buried or cremated, are also often part of estate plan documents.

== Probate ==
Countries whose legal systems evolved from the British common law system, like the United States, typically use the probate system for distributing property at death. Probate is a process where

1. the decedent's purported will, if any, is entered in court,
2. after hearing evidence from the representative of the estate, the court decides if the will is valid,
3. a personal representative is appointed by the court as a fiduciary to gather and take control of the estate's assets,
4. known and unknown creditors are notified (through direct notice or publication in the media) to file any claims against the estate,
5. claims are paid out (if funds remain) in the order or priority governed by state statute,
6. remaining funds are distributed to beneficiaries named in the will, or heirs (next-of-kin) if there is no will, and
7. the probate judge closes out the estate.

=== Probate avoidance ===
Due to the time and expenses associated with the traditional probate process, modern estate planners frequently counsel clients to enact probate avoidance strategies. Some common probate-avoidance strategies include:

1. revocable living trusts (sometimes called revocable inter vivos trusts),
2. joint ownership of assets and naming death beneficiaries,
3. making lifetime gifts, and
4. purchasing life insurance.

If a revocable living trust is used as part of an estate plan, the key to probate avoidance is ensuring that the living trust is "funded" during the lifetime of the person establishing it. After executing a trust agreement, the settlor should ensure that all assets are properly re-registered in the name of the living trust. If assets (especially higher-value assets and real estate) remain outside a trust, a probate proceeding may be necessary to transfer them to the trust upon the testator's death.

=== Designation of a beneficiary ===
Although legal restrictions may apply, it is generally possible to convey property outside of probate through tools such as a living trust, forms of joint property ownership that include a right of survivorship, a payable-on-death account, or a beneficiary designation on a financial account or insurance policy. Beneficiary designations are considered distributions under contract law and cannot be changed by statements or provisions outside the contract, such as a clause in a will.

In the United States, without a beneficiary statement, the default provision in the contract or custodial agreement (for an IRA) will apply, which may be the owner's estate, resulting in higher taxes and additional fees. Generally, beneficiary designations are made for life insurance policies, employee benefits (including retirement plans and group life insurance), and Individual Retirement Accounts.

- Identity: A specific, identifiable individual or business must be designated as beneficiary for life insurance policies. Businesses may not be the beneficiary of a group life insurance policy or a retirement plan.
- Contingent beneficiary: If the primary beneficiary predeceases the contract owner, the contingent beneficiary becomes the designated beneficiary. If a contingent beneficiary is not named, the default provision in the contract or custodian agreement applies.
- Death: For retirement plan assets, at the account owner's death, the primary beneficiary may select their own beneficiaries if the remaining balance will be paid out over time. There is no obligation to retain the contingent beneficiary designated by the IRA owner.
- Multiple accounts: A policy owner or retirement account owner can designate multiple beneficiaries. However, retirement plans governed by ERISA provide protections for account holders' spouses that prevent the disinheritance of a living spouse.

=== Mediation ===
Mediation serves as an alternative to full-scale litigation to settle disputes. At a mediation, family members and beneficiaries discuss plans for the transfer of assets. Because of the potential conflicts associated with blended families, step-siblings, and multiple marriages, creating an estate plan through mediation allows people to confront these issues head-on and design a plan that minimizes the risk of future family conflict and meets their financial goals.

== By country ==
=== Malaysia ===
In West Malaysia and Sarawak, wills are governed by the Wills Act 1959. In Sabah, the Will Ordinance (Sabah Cap. 158) applies. The Wills Act 1959 and the Wills Ordinance apply to non-Muslims only. Section 2(2) of the Wills Act 1959 states that the Act does not apply to wills of persons professing the religion of Islam. For Muslims, inheritance will be governed under Syariah law, where one would need to prepare Syariah-compliant Islamic instruments for succession.

Section 2 of the Wills Act 1959 defines a will as a 'declaration intended to have legal effect of the intentions of a testator with respect to his property or other matters which he desires to be carried into effect after his death and includes a testament, a codicil and an appointment by will or by writing like a will in exercise of a power and also a disposition by will or testament of the guardianship, custody and tuition of any child'.

==== Validity ====
In Malaysia, a person writing a will must comply with the formalities stated in Section 5 of the Wills Act 1959 for the will to be valid and effective.

Under the Wills Act 1959, the minimum age to write a will is 18, whereas in Sabah it is 21. At the time of signing a will, the testator, as the maker of the will, must have a sound mind, which means they must be fully aware that the document they are signing is a will, understand the contents of their will, and not be intoxicated by drugs or any mental illness affecting their mental capacity. At the time of signing, he must not be under duress or undue influence. In addition, when the testator signs the will, there must be at least two witnesses who are at least 18 years old, of sound mind, and who are not visually impaired. The role of the witnesses is only to attest that the testator signed their will.

1. . The will must be in writing. No will shall be valid unless it is in writing and executed in the manner provided in section 5(2) of the Wills Act 1959.
2. Testator must be of the age of majority. The testator must be at least 18 years old as stipulated under the Age of Majority Act 1971 in Peninsular Malaysia and Sarawak, whereas in Sabah, the age of majority is 21 years old as stated under Section 4 of the Wills Ordinance 1953.
3. Signing of Will. The will must be attested by two or more witnesses in the presence of the testator and each other. A beneficiary or their spouse cannot be a witness to the will. No beneficiary or their spouse will be entitled to receive any devise, legacy, estate, interest, gift, or appointment if the beneficiary or their spouse is the attesting witness to the will.
4. Sound Mind. The testator must be of 'sound mind' ("testamentary capacity") as provided by Section 3 of the Wills Act 1959. If the testator is ill or of old age, it is advisable to obtain a letter from the medical practitioner stating that the testator is of sound mind and not under the influence of any medication.

==== Revocation of the Will ====
1. Marriage: marriage will revoke a will made earlier by the testator unless it was expressed in the will that it was made in contemplation of marriage, and shall not be revoked by the solemnisation of the marriage contemplated to the named fiancé(e).
2. Writing a new will: only the latest will would be recognised as the valid one by the courts
3. Declaration in writing of an intention to revoke the will: the testator makes a written statement about their intention to revoke the will. The statement must be signed by the testator in the presence of two witnesses.
4. Conversion to the Islamic faith: Section 2(2) of the Wills Act 1959 states that the Act does not apply to wills of persons professing the religion of Islam. When the testator (previously a non-Muslim) embraces the Islamic faith, the will previously made shall be void, as it no longer falls within the ambit of the Wills Act 1959. The testator, after conversion, can write a new will in accordance with the Islamic Laws whereby only one third of the total estate can be disposed of by way of a will, and the remaining two thirds by Sijil Faraid (a certificate of Muslim inheritance law). If the Muslim testator would like to dispose of more than one-third of their total estate, the consent of all lawful beneficiaries must be obtained.
5. Intentional destruction: pursuant to Section 14 of the Wills Act of Malaysia, a will can be burnt, torn, or otherwise intentionally destroyed by the testator or a third party in the presence of the testator and under their direction, with the intention to revoke the will. Accidental or malicious destruction by a third party does not render the revocation effective.

==== Intestate succession ====
If a person dies without a will, the Distribution Act 1958 (which was amended in 1997) applies. It provides for a list of heirs who are entitled, and this is best shown in the table below:

Deceased died without a Will and is survived by...	Entitlement of the heirs...
Spouse only	All to the spouse
Children only	All the children equally, if there is more than one
Parent(s) only	All to the parents equally, if there is more than one
Spouse and children	1/3 to the spouse
Spouse and parent(s)	1/2 to the spouse 1/2 to the parents equally, if there is more than one
Spouse, children and parent(s)	1/4 to the spouse 1/4 to the parents equally, if there is more than one 2/4 to the children equally, if there is more than one
Children and parent(s)	1/3 to the parents, if there is more than one 2/3 to the children equally, if there is more than one

=== Canada ===
Inheritance law in Canada is constitutionally a provincial matter. Therefore, the laws governing inheritance in Canada are legislated by each individual province.

=== United States ===
In the United States, the process of estate planning is regulated. The U.S. law of estate planning overlaps to some degree with elder law, which additionally includes other provisions such as long-term care.

== See also ==
- Estate (law)
- Inheritance
- Personal finance
- Stepped-up basis

== Bibliography ==
- Society of Certified Senior Advisors (2009). "Working with Seniors Health, Financial and Social Issues".
- William P. Streng, J.D., Estate Planning, Estates, Gifts and Trusts Portfolios, Vol. 800 (2nd ed. 2012), Bloomberg BNA.
