= Elder law in India =

The rights of older persons are the entitlements and independence claimed for senior citizens (i.e. above 60 years of age). Elderly rights are one of the fundamental rights of India. The International Day of older persons is celebrated annually on October 1.

The 2001 census of India demonstrated that aged people in India have crossed over 100 million. Many older people in India are not alert about the human rights of older persons, due to high occurrence of illiteracy and lack of alertness. Elder illiteracy directly contributes to a lack of knowledge regarding the human rights for older people in India, and contributes to the infringement of those rights.

== Overview ==
Surveys have found that one out of every six older persons living in urban areas in India aren't obtaining proper nutrition, one out of every three older persons does not obtain sufficient health care or medicine, and one out of every two older persons don't receive due respect or good conduct from family members or people in general.

In today's state of urbanization in which women are increasingly joining the workforce, the roots of joint family systems are eroding. Higher numbers of older people who have spent most of their life with their joint/extended families may face loneliness and marginalization in their old age. In rural areas the older members of families, (i.e.: people who are above 60 years of age), are respected more and are considered a strong part of the family as the joint family system remains part of their roots. In villages 46.91% of the older men and 50.1% of older women are from joint families. In rural areas 13,560 out of 29,000 rural elderly have joint families.

== Governmental concessions and facilities ==
The government of India provides various concessions and facilities to its senior citizens. The Union Cabinet's latest decision to approve a new law - Maintenance and Welfare of Parents and Senior Citizens Act, 2007, aimed at serving the elderly live in self-respect and peace. The Bill to be introduced in Parliament this monsoon session includes provisions to guard India's senior citizens besides specifically prescribing the State's role in taking care of them. The Bill also places a legal responsibility on children and relatives to maintain the senior citizen or parent in order to facilitate seniors with a normal life. This obligation applies to all Indian citizens, including those who live abroad. The offspring and relatives of seniors will be required to provide sufficient support for senior citizens, while the state governments will create old age homes in every district.

=== Health ===
Many government and private hospitals provide concessions to the older persons in the treatment of the diseases like cardiac problems, diabetes, kidney problems, blood pressure, joint problems and eye problems. There is also a condition for separate queuing of reservations for hospital beds.

=== Travel ===
Indian railways give 30% concessions in the ticket prices to all the persons aged 60 years and above. It is 50% for women aged over 60 years. Proof of age is required. There are also conditions of lower berth for older persons and also separate counters for booking and cancelling tickets to avoid rushes at the counters. Indian airlines provide 50% concessions in its economy class, (with particular terms and conditions applied). Air India provides 45% concessions to older persons in wheel chairs and are allowed to board the plane first. Higher rates of interest to its senior citizens on certain savings plans which are run by the post offices and other private banks. However, the concession for senior citizens was withdrawn by the Railways on March 20, 2020, and according to an RTI query response, the Indian Railways earned an additional ₹8,913 crore (US$1.1 billion) over five years by withdrawing the senior citizens' concession.

=== Housing ===
The Indian government provides housing facilities such as retirement homes and recreational or educational centers. These centers provide older persons with opportunities to spend their free time doing various activities. Most recreational centers have fitness clubs, yoga centers, parks, spiritual sessions, picnics, food fests for the health and entertainment of senior citizens. Some old age homes also have libraries other activities such as music classes, arts and crafts, quizzes and indoor games. These activities help to spiritually uplift seniors and can contribute to overall health improvements and mental stability.

== Difficulties faced by older persons ==
Health and care
Physical and mental health care availability and community and social care aspects of life for the elderly are key concerns. Nutritional problems are also a concern.

Income and housing
Access to employment opportunities, transportation, housing and income are key concerns. Inhumane living conditions are also a concern.

Social networks and customs
Poor social interaction with family and friends, poor social networks, and those without families are some difficulties faced by some senior citizens. Social customs based upon elder neglect, which the elderly may internalize as beliefs are topics of concern. Losing the will to live from a lack of social support is another issue.

Additional concerns
Educational access and opportunities, the potential for leisure pursuits, consumer protections and having access to information are also key concerns.

== See also ==
- Ageing
- Maintenance and Welfare of Parents and Senior Citizens Act, 2007
