= Wendy Greengross =

English general practitioner and broadcaster

- Born: 29 April 1925; Golders Green, London, UK
- Died: 10 October 2012 (aged 87)
- Spouse: Alex Kates
- Children: 5

Wendy Elsa Greengross (29 April 1925 – 10 October 2012) was a British general practitioner and broadcaster. The Independent called her "a pioneering counsellor and one of the leading figures in fighting for equal rights for the disabled and the elderly".

== Early life ==
Wendy Elsa Greengross was born on 29 April 1925, at 10 St Mary's Road, Golders Green, London, the daughter of Morris Philip Greengross, born Moisze Fiszel Gringross (1892–1970), a manufacturing jeweller, and his wife, Miriam Greengross, née Abrahamson (1899/1900–1968).

Her father was mayor of Holborn from 1960 to 1961, and her brother Sir Alan Greengross (born 1929) was a leading Conservative member of the Greater London Council.

Greengross was educated at South Hampstead High School from 1936 until she was evacuated to Berkhamsted, Hertfordshire, followed by University College Hospital, where she qualified as a doctor in 1949, and in 1952 won a Fulbright Scholarship to the Chicago Lying-in Hospital.

== Career ==
Together with her husband, Greengross ran a large general practice in Tottenham, London. Opened in 1955, it was one of the UK's first group practices. She particularly promoted family planning, and they were the country's first GP practice to have a dedicated marriage guidance. Greengross worked as a GP for 35 years.

Greengross received counsellor training from the Marriage Guidance Council (now Relate), and would go on to become its Chief Medical Adviser. In the late 1960s, Greengross started teaching pastoral care and counselling at Leo Baeck College.

Greengross went into broadcasting in the early 1970s, joining the BBC Radio 4 counselling programme If You Think You've Got Problems, which ran for nearly eight years. She had her own television show on BBC1 in 1973, Let's Talk it Over.

From 1972 to 1976, Greengross was an agony aunt for The Sun, but "felt the letters passed to her were more about titillation than education".

Greengross wrote Jewish and Homosexual, published in 1980, by the Reform Synagogues of Great Britain, which "led the way towards equality within the British Reform and Liberal movements". Greengross published several sex education books, particularly focused on more marginalised groups, such as Sex and the Handicapped Child in 1980.

Greengross was a founding member and chair of the organisation Sexual Problems of Disabled People (SPOD), and a founder of the Residential Care Consortium.

== Selected publications ==
- Sex in the Middle Years (1969)
- Sex in Early Marriage (1970)
- Entitled to Love: the Sexual and Emotional Needs of the Handicapped (1976)
- Sex and the Handicapped Child (1980)
- Jewish and Homosexual (1980)
- Living, Loving and Ageing (1989), with her sister-in-law Baroness Sally Greengross

== Personal life ==
In 1951, she married a surgeon, Alex Kates, and they had five children.

Greengross had two daughters, Hilary and Polly, and three sons Nick, Richard, and Trevor (d. 1997).

Greengross lived for many years in Hampstead Garden Suburb, before a retirement flat in Regent's Park Road, where she died on 10 October 2012 of pneumonia. She was buried at Cheshunt's Jewish Cemetery.
