= Gray Panthers =

American organization promoting senior citizens' rights

The Gray Panthers are a series of multi-generational local advocacy networks in the United States which confront ageism and many other social justice issues. The organization was formed by Maggie Kuhn in response to her forced retirement from the Presbyterian Church at the age of 65 in 1970. The Gray Panthers are named in reference to the Black Panthers.

In addition to its initial response to the issue of mandatory retirement, Gray Panthers have challenged other ageist laws and stereotypes and engaged in anti-war activism, Medicare and Social Security preservation, inter-generational housing, LGBT rights advocacy, environmentalism, the fair treatment of people in nursing homes, and the promotion of single-payer health care.

== History ==
=== Founding history ===
Maggie Kuhn's interest in older persons’ rights existed well before she founded the Gray Panthers in 1970. She was involved with the White House Conference on Aging in 1961, and was appalled by the way people in some retirement homes were treated.

What really sparked her determination to form an activist organization was when she found herself a victim of the lack of rights for older persons in 1970, forced to retire from a job she loved in the Presbyterian Church. Instead of passively accepting retirement, Kuhn decided to band together with other people she knew who were also forced to retire. The lack of accepting the status quo would not just form the Gray Panther organization, but also the Gray Panther name--“It’s a fun name. There’s a certain militancy, rather than just a docile acceptance of what our country’s doing.”

When Kuhn formed the organization, her alliances were not just limited to other older persons facing a plight similar to her own. Gray Panther's membership continues to be inclusive of people of diverse ages.

=== Issues in the 1970s and 1980s ===
During this period, the main issues of the Gray Panthers included forced retirement, ageist stereotypes, cuts to Medicare and Social Security, and world peace.

There had been a mandatory forced retirement age at 65, based on the perception that older persons could not be productive members of a workplace after that age. While that stereotype was difficult to overcome, the Panthers were ultimately successful in their efforts to overturn the law, and in 1986, Congress passed a law banning mandatory retirement in most jobs. The law was signed by President Ronald Reagan, as of that time the oldest ever President of the United States.

There were other ageist stereotypes that the Gray Panthers wanted to end. In particular, the stereotype that older persons were “impotent, frail, disabled, demented, or dependent.” By confronting those stereotypes, the Gray Panthers were at the forefront of ideas some considered provocative—namely, ideas that older persons should be able to live in inter-generational housing, and that older people can and should freely have sex. And, of course, many of Maggie Kuhn's quotes—including,”Old age is not a disease, it is strength and survivorship, triumph over all kinds of vicissitudes and disappointments, trials and illnesses”—were used as weapons against ageist stereotypes.

While the Gray Panthers wanted to counteract the stereotypes that older persons were weak, disabled, and incapable of doing much physical labor, the organization still cared deeply for people who were frail. As such, the organization was among the most vocal opponents to President Reagan's proposed cuts to Medicare and Social Security. As with the ban on mandatory retirement, this was an issue where the Gray Panthers were able to get what they wanted and Medicare and Social Security were saved from deep cuts.

Another key facet of Gray Panther work from its early years was its advocacy for peace. The Panthers, both young and old, were particularly vociferous in its opposition to the Vietnam War, and war, in general, was a part of the Gray Panthers platform from the very beginning. The organization's work in being anti-war did not stop with Vietnam—the Panthers were opponents of several of President Reagan's plans, such as his “Star Wars” and increased foreign intervention in Central America.

=== Issues in the 1990s and 2000s ===
While mandatory retirement ages were abolished in 1986, there were still many threats and social injustices for Gray Panthers to address, including world peace, Medicare and Social Security Benefits, and single-payer health care. They would also become a prominent advocate for LGBT rights.

The organization was prominent in protests against both Iraq Wars, in 1991 and 2003. There were even some Gray Panthers who were arrested over protests in 2003. While such efforts were originally unsuccessful, protesting these wars resonated with younger generations of potential Gray Panthers, therefore, engaging the “youth” part of “Age and Youth in Action.” Furthermore, with the 2003 Iraq War, the Gray Panthers were critical of American intervention years before the majority of Americans shared similar opinions.

The Gray Panthers also advocated for a robust national health care system, whether it be through the preservation of Medicare and Social Security, or through single-payer health care. On these issues, the organization continued to succeed in preserving Medicare and Social Security, though the Clinton Administration's health care proposal in 1993-94 fell short of what the Gray Panthers wanted. In fact, the health care plan Maggie Kuhn championed what was described by The New York Times as “the most radical of the various proposals: health insurance paid totally by the government.”

The organization protested President Bill Clinton’s “Don’t Ask, Don’t Tell” policy which kept members of the military from being openly LGBT. The Gray Panthers were, therefore, at the forefront of an issue which was deeply unpopular at the time.

=== Present-day issues ===
In the present day, the Gray Panthers continue to be at the forefront of advocacy against ageism and for social justice at the local, national, and international levels.

Within the United States, the Gray Panthers have received considerable media attention for triggering an audit of nursing home violations, confronting ageist stereotypes at all levels of society, and bringing attention to other issues which affect the quality of life of all seniors. The Gray Panthers are working with the United States Department of Labor to ensure support for family caregivers, and are involved in discussions on how to deliver improved home health care in the United States.

Action and advocacy for older persons is not confined just to the United States. The Gray Panthers have also become increasingly prominent at the United Nations. The organization is one of the strongest advocates for a binding global Convention to protect the Human Rights of Older Persons. Gray Panthers has been instrumental in ensuring that the concerns of older persons have been enshrined in the Sustainable Development Goals, the world's blueprint for social, economic, and environmental development. Ensuring that the rights of older women would be recognized, Gray Panthers successfully overcame resistance so that the Convention for the Elimination of Discrimination Against Women had explicit protections. Gray Panthers has become one of the most prominent American non-governmental organizations advocating for the rights of older persons globally.

== Notable Gray Panthers ==
- Maggie Kuhn, founder
- Ralph Nader, responsible for merger of Retired Professionals Action Group with Gray Panthers
- Jule Sugarman, founder of HeadStart and Former Interim Executive Director of the Gray Panthers
- Ron Wyden, U.S. Senator from Oregon
