= Cecil Jackson-Cole =

English businessman and philanthropist (1901–79)

- Born: Albert Cecil Cole; 1 November 1901; Forest Gate, London, England
- Died: 9 August 1979 (aged 77); Kent, England
- Education: Balliol College, Oxford

Cecil Jackson-Cole (1901-1979) was an English entrepreneur and humanitarian. He was associated with a number of charities including Oxfam, Help the Aged and ActionAid.

A devout Christian, Jackson-Cole set up charitable trusts including the Voluntary and Christian Service Trust that ultimately gave rise to the charities Help the Aged (1961), the Anchor Housing Trust (1968) and Action Aid (1973). He was a co-founder of the Oxford Committee for Famine Relief which became the largest charity of its kind in the British Commonwealth. He was the founder of the Andrews Charitable Trust (formally the Phyllis Trust and World in Need) the first modern Venture Philanthropy organisation.

In 1946, Jackson-Cole founded Andrews and Partners Estate Agents as a business with an ulterior purpose: the development of charities. In 1965 he created Phyllis Trust (later renamed to World in Need, and later to Andrews Charitable Trust), and the Christian Initiative Trust. The Christian Book Promotion Trust was formed in 1967. Andrews & Partners is 100% owned by Andrews Charitable Trust, who are its only shareholder.

== Early life ==
Jackson-Cole was born on 1 November 1901 at 27 Knox Road, Forest Gate, the elder child and only son (there was another son from a later marriage) of Albert Edward Cole, a dealer in new and secondhand furniture, and his wife (who was also his cousin), Nellie Catherine Jackson. He had a sister called Winifred Gertrude Cole (born in 1906). He had an unsettled childhood, as his father moved so frequently that he spent an average of only nine months at each of the many schools he attended. In 1911 they lived at Whitehall Road, Grays, Essex and his father was a Credit Boot and Shoe Dealer and his mother a Retail China and Glass Merchant. Cecil decided to leave education to start working full-time and provide for his family at the age of 13. He got a job, which he left in 1918, as an Office Boy at George and John Nicksons General Provision Merchants on Tooley Street, London. In 1914, the family lived on Ashton Street, in Poplar, London and Cecil and Winifred attended Prospect Terrace School. Cecil's Father Albert, fought in World War I in the Birkenhead Bantam Battalion.

=== University ===
At the age of 28 Cecil enrolled at Balliol College, Oxford, as an external student to study economics and improve his business skills. He attended lectures by G.D.H Cole.

=== Marriage ===
Cecil married Phyllis Cole in 1936 (who was also his cousin). When she died in 1956, he set up a Charitable Trust in her name; the Phyllis Trust.

In 1973, Cecil married Theo Handley. They married in the UK and had a blessing at Delhi Cathedral; India.

== Business ==
Cecil Jackson-Cole was a successful business man as the owner and manager of Andrews Furnishers with branches in London and Oxford. According to an advertisement in the shop window in 1976, the last day of trading for the furniture franchise was on 14 May 1976. The advertisement reads; 'Interment of a business: This business established in 1845 is closing down after 131 years of successful existence. For years past the dividends have been largely for the benefit of charity and now the shop is to be used entirely for charity work.'

In 1946, Leslie Swain and Raymond Andrews joined Jackson-Cole in business, both answering an advertisement from 'a Company which gives a third of its profits to the staff, a third to charity and the remaining third for the organisation'. The company was Andrews & Partners. Raymond Andrews was engaged to manage it, and Leslie Swain to set up its mortgage and insurance broking department. Jackson-Cole believed that, to be successful, a charity had to be run as a business. To transform Oxfam into a national body, Leslie Swain was seconded to Oxfam for a year from Andrews & Partners, where he had been since the business was set up in 1946. In 1962, Raymond Andrews set up the National Association of Estate Agents as a way of upholding good practice and high professional standards in UK Estate Agency. Raymond resigned as Chairman of Andrews in May 1986, and Alec Reed succeeded him. He put in financial controls and took out the unnecessary costs to transform Andrews from making a loss of £297,000 in 1985 to making a profit of just over £1 million in 1986. Alec Reed said; "In a way, he's my hero, although I never met him, but I liked the way he went about things, such as creating companies that could contribute to charities."

Jackson-Cole created a Trust funded through Andrews and Partners called the Voluntary Christian Service.

Andrews is owned by three charitable trusts which derive most of their income from annual dividends, and has helped to found a number of large charities including Oxfam and Action Aid.

== Charities ==
Jackson-Cole first became involved in charitable work through the Soldiers' and Sailors' Home, Watford. The work carried out by Andrews' staff in the organisation of charities was mostly done through an informal committee set up in 1953 and known as the Help for Vital Causes Group. The title was later changed to Voluntary and Christian Service. Through the VCS, Jackson-Cole created and developed Help the Aged, several Housing Associations and the children's charity, Action Aid, to a point where they could be spun-off as self-governing charities. Jackson-Cole set up trusts not only to support charitable work but primarily to underpin his involvement in charity. He had an all consuming vocation to relieve suffering in the world and he constructed an elaborate alliance of businesses, trusts and charities to achieve his aims.

=== Help the Aged ===
Help the Aged Logo

The Help the Aged Refugees Appeal was set up in 1961 by Jackson-Cole in response to the needs of older refugees and other older people following natural disasters and conflict in the former Yugoslavia, former East Pakistan (now Bangladesh) and Rwanda. The appeal raised £105,302 in its first year.

Jackson-Cole founded Helpage India. In March 1974, when Jackson Cole, founder of HelpAge International visited India, Samson Daniel, a philanthropist, approached him for financial help to set up a member organisation in Delhi. Cole instead offered to train him to raise funds. After a three-month training course in London, Daniel and his wife returned to India and organised a sponsored walk with schoolchildren in Delhi. It was so successful that in 1975 HelpAge International recruited more staff to cover Bombay, Madras and Calcutta.

=== Oxfam ===
The driving force behind the continued existence of the Oxford Committee was Jackson-Cole.

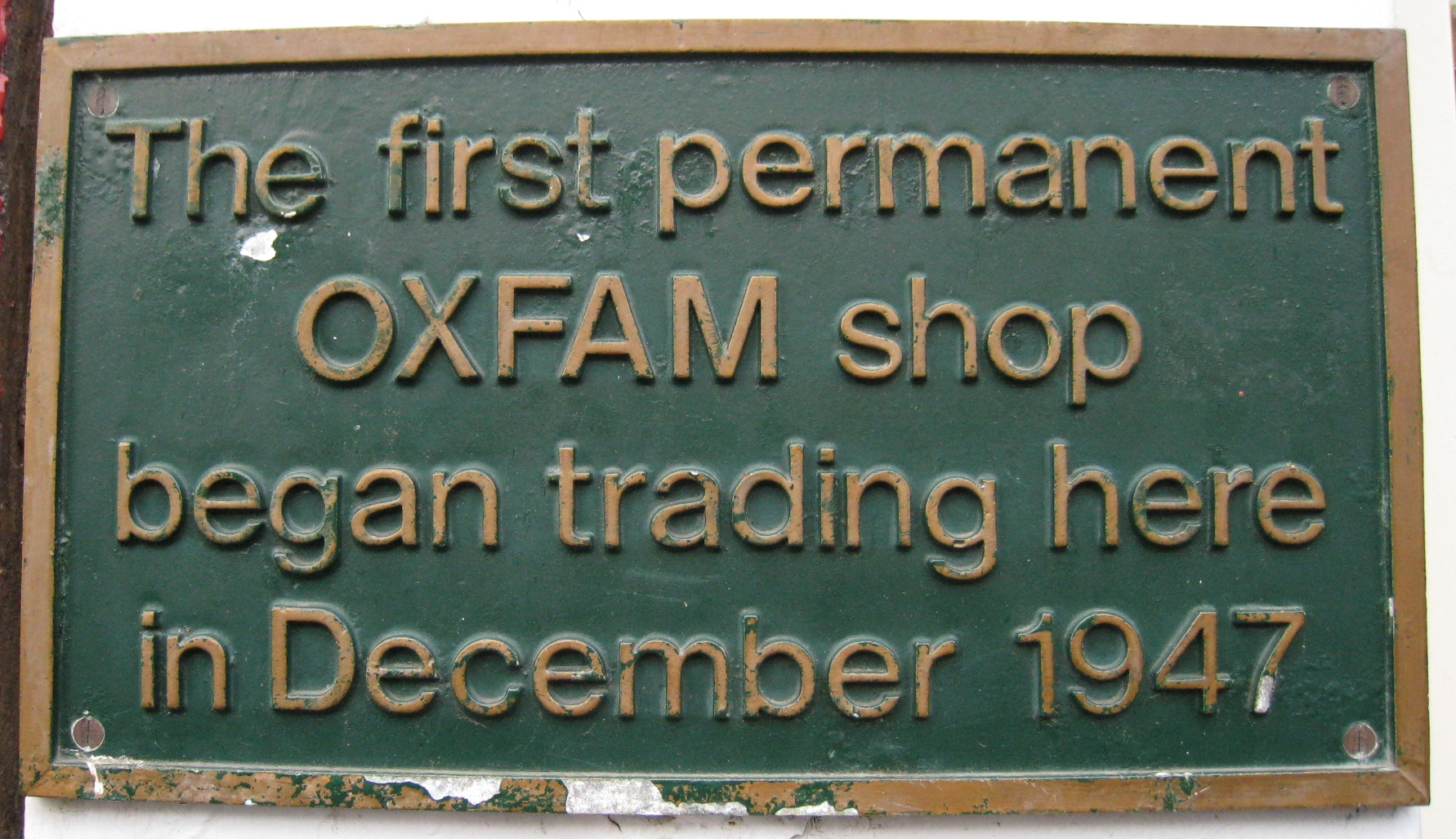
Plaque attached to the original Oxfam shop at 17 Broad Street, Oxford

The Oxford Committee for Famine Relief (subsequently Oxfam) was formed with Jackson-Cole as first honorary secretary. He became the business brain and dynamic driving force behind this relief and development agency. In 1948 the question arose of whether Oxfam should terminate its activities because Europe was felt to be on the road to recovery. The committee decided unanimously against this, and Jackson-Cole spearheaded the growth and expansion of the charity. For five years he virtually ran it himself. As a member of Oxfam's council of management he retained his interest and involvement until 1979, serving as secretary emeritus in later years. His vision led to the setting up of autonomous Oxfams in Quebec in Canada, the US, and Belgium.

Despite the improvements in European conditions, there was throughout the world great suffering and need, and as long as this was so – 'the work' must go on. An efficient if modest vehicle had been developed. When the Committee met in September 1948 to discuss whether to close down, Jackson-Cole had laid the groundwork for a decision in favour of widening the scope of its activities.

His contributions to Oxfam were recognised in 2002 with a blue plaque outside 17 Broad Street, where he helped establish the first Oxfam gift shop.

=== Action Aid ===
Actionaid logo

Jackson-Cole founded Action Aid (then known as Action in Distress) under the Voluntary Christian Service in 1972 as a child sponsorship charity. He found 88 UK supporters to sponsor 88 children in India and Kenya. The focus was on providing children with an education.

=== Toc H ===
Jackson-Cole was on the central finance committee at Toc H for a number of years. In 1930, he bought Warden Manor in Sheerness, and let Toc H use it as a holiday retreat for the elderly and a resting place for soldiers.

=== Andrews Charitable Trust ===
Jackson-Cole endowed the Phyllis Trust with shares from Andrews in 1965. The trust changed its name in the 1980s to World in Need, and in 2005 to Andrews Charitable Trust. It remains the 100% shareholder and recipient of the business's dividend. Like Jackson-Cole, the trust practices engaged philanthropy, sometimes called venture philanthropy, by providing both grants and business advice to the grantees.

=== Christian Book Promotion Trust ===
The Christian Book Promotion Trust was founded in 1967 by Jackson-Cole. He created the charity because there was little Christian literature to help him when his wife Phyllis died, and limited information available when he was growing up. The trust is also known as Speaking Volumes. They help libraries and schools stock Christian books that are accessible to everyone.

=== Christian Initiative Trust ===
The Christian Initiative Trust was established in 1968 by Jackson-Cole as a grant making trust providing small grants to support Christian Initiatives that promote and share the Christian faith and provide practical help for disadvantaged and marginalised people within communities, as a demonstration of the Christian faith and principles.

== Death ==
Cecil Jackson-Cole died of pancreatic cancer on 9 August 1979 at Burrswood Hospital in Kent.
