= Sally Greengross, Baroness Greengross =

British politician (1935–2022)

The Right Honourable The Baroness Greengross OBE
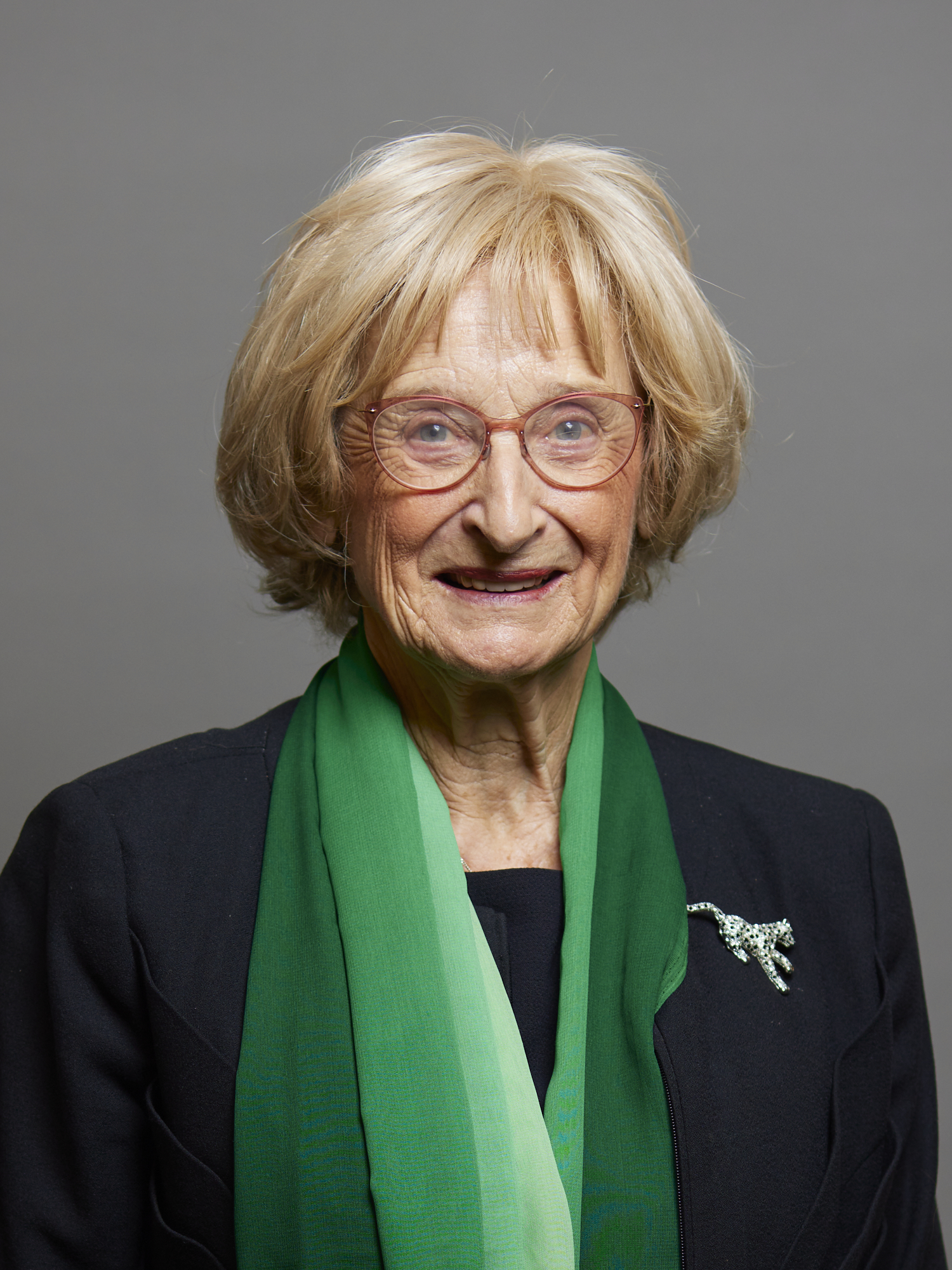
- Official portrait, 2021

Member of the House of Lords
- Lord Temporal
- Life peerage 10 February 2000 – 23 June 2022

Personal details
- Born: Sally Ralea Rosengarten; 29 June 1935 Hendon, Middlesex, England
- Died: 23 June 2022 (aged 86) Bayswater, London, England
- Party: Crossbench
- Spouse: Alan Greengross (m. 1959; died 2018)
- Children: 4
- Education: Brighton and Hove High School; London School of Economics

Sally Ralea Greengross, Baroness Greengross, OBE (née Rosengarten; 29 June 1935 – 23 June 2022) was a British politician. Awarded an OBE in the 1993 New Year Honours, Greengross was raised to the peerage as Baroness Greengross, of Notting Hill in the Royal Borough of Kensington and Chelsea in 2000, sitting as a crossbencher.

== Early life and education ==
Greengross was born in Hendon, Middlesex on 29 June 1935. Her family moved to Brighton after the outbreak of World War II, and she was educated at Brighton and Hove High School, a girls private school. She went on to study at the London School of Economics and Political Science.

== Career ==
Greengross was Director General of Age Concern England from 1987 until 2000; also until 2000, she was joint Chair of the Age Concern Institute of Gerontology at King's College London, and Secretary General of Eurolink Age.

Her appointments included that of Chair of the Advisory Groups for the English Longitudinal Study of Ageing (ELSA) and the New Dynamics of Ageing (NDA); and Chief Executive of the International Longevity Centre - UK, President of the Pensions Policy Institute and Honorary Vice President of the Royal Society for the Promotion of Health.

=== Political career ===
Greengross was an independent crossbench member of the House of Lords from 2000 until her death in 2022 and co-chaired five All-Party Parliamentary Groups: Dementia, Corporate Social Responsibility, Bladder and Bowel Continence Care, Social Care and Ageing and Older People. She was the Vice Chair of the All-Party Parliamentary Groups on Choice at the End of Life and Longevity, and was the Treasurer of the All-Party Parliamentary Group on Equalities. She was also Chair of the cross-party Intergenerational Fairness Forum. In December 2006, it was announced that she would be a Commissioner for the Equality and Human Rights Commission. Whilst Chair of the Association of Retirement Housing Managers, Baroness Greengross made the following statement in the House of Lords on 23 April 2012:

"It is difficult, not least for the providers of schemes, who are dealing with people who are often prepared to spend 12 or more hours a day focusing on those issues and who can make amazing barrack-room lawyers – I do not want to be insulting – because they have so much time to concentrate on that. So it is a difficult as well as an important issue. Housing designed for older people whose needs change as they age faces an almost built-in conflict of interest. They need more services as they age, so the costs are going to rise as more care is provided. Their income tends to be less over the years. They wish to reduce the cost but they need more services. Older and frailer residents are more costly, so when residents manage the schemes themselves they may wish to sell to active, fit and therefore younger people."

== Personal life and death ==
In 1959, she married Alan Greengross; the couple had three daughters and one son. Alan died in August 2018. She was an honorary associate of the National Secular Society.

Greengross died from neuroendocrine cancer at her flat in Bayswater, London, on 23 June 2022, aged 86.

== Honours ==
Greengross held honorary doctorates from several British universities. She was awarded an Honorary Doctor of Letters (DLitt) degree by the University of Ulster in 1994, Brunel University in 2002, University of Keele in 2004. She was awarded a Doctor of the University (DUniv) degree by the Kingston University in 1996, the Open University and Leeds Metropolitan University in 2002. She was awarded an Honorary Doctor of Laws (LLD) by the University of Exeter in 2000.
