= David Hobman =

David Burton Hobman CBE (27 June 1927 – 24 December 2003) was a British social and elder rights activist, broadcaster and the first Director of Age Concern England.
